= New Dutch Academy =

Dutch Baroque orchestra

The New Dutch Academy (NDA) is an international Dutch Baroque orchestra based in The Hague, the Netherlands. It is composed of 40 international, early music, specialist musicians, who gather in The Hague to explore 18th-century music in all of its forms, including symphonic, chamber, opera and ballet. It performs exclusively on authentic instruments.

The orchestra's chief conductor and artistic director is Australian conductor Simon Murphy. In its home city of The Hague, the orchestra runs its own chamber, Baroque and symphonic concert series in partnership with venues Philipszaal, the Raad van State and the Dutch radio. The orchestra tours regularly and has appeared at many of the major European music festivals. Tours outside of Europe have taken the orchestra through North America, Russia, Asia and Australia. The orchestra records for Dutch label PENTATONE and has won major music industry awards for its CDs, including the Edison Award.

== Tours and performances ==
The NDA's performances in the Low Countries have included cycles of Stamitz, Mozart, Haydn, Beethoven and Mendelssohn symphonies for Dutch radio at Amsterdam's Het Concertgebouw, Rotterdam's De Doelen, Utrecht's Vredenburg and The Hague's Philipszaal.

The NDA has appeared at major European festivals including the Händel Festspiele Halle, the Bachfest Leipzig, Thüringer Bachwochen, Musikfestspiele Potsdam Sanssouci, Roma Europa Festival, Goldberg Festival, and the Festival van Vlaanderen (Festival of Flanders).

The orchestra has also made concert tours through Europe, the U.S., Canada, Russia, Asia and Australia with live concert performances being broadcast by NTR, AVRO, RNW, EBU, DLF, HR, MDR, RAI and ABC.

== Discography ==
The NDA's discography includes world première presentations of works of 18th century symphonists Stamitz, Richter, Schmitt ("The Dutch Haydn"), Graaf, Schwindl and Zappa.

The groundbreaking NDA recording of Corelli's Concerti Grossi, made during the 2003 Festival of Early Music Utrecht, was the first disc to ever present Corelli's own large-scale, authentic orchestral soundscape, featuring Corelli's preferred instrumentation with a large variety and number of basso continuo instruments (cello, bass, organs, harpsichords, baroque lutes, baroque guitars, archlutes and theorbos), together with improvisation and extemporisation. It was voted by Dutch national radio as one of the top five highlights in the 30-year history of the festival and was reviewed by the BBC Music Magazine as "the best of both worlds ... the NDA is a big band playing on period instruments".

The NDA's CDs for PENTATONE include Early Mannheim String Symphonies by Stamitz and Richter Vol. 1 and Vol. 2 (2003 and 2004), Corelli Concerti Grossi (2004), Joseph Schmitt "The Dutch Haydn" Early Symphonies (2006) and Zappa Symphonies / Symphonies from the Court of Orange, The Hague (2009). GRAND TOUR Baroque Road Trip (PENTATONE 2017) features works by Telemann, Vivaldi, van Wassenaer, and Bach. "JET SET! Classical Glitterati" (PENTATONE 2019) features the Viola Concerto in E-flat by Zelter alongside first recordings of symphonies by Abel and Reichardt. Live concert performances of the NDA have been featured on live CD sets by the Dutch national broadcaster and include performances of Mozart and Beethoven Symphonies.

== Background ==
The orchestra was established in 2002. It was launched through a 3-day festival of lectures, recitals, and concerts of chamber and orchestral music presented in the Netherlands' oldest purpose build concert hall, the Felix Meritis, in partnership with Dutch radio NCRV in March 2002.

The orchestra made its Festival of Early Music Utrecht début in 2002 and its debut in the Amsterdam Het Concertgebouw in 2004. The orchestra released its first CDs with Pentatone in early 2003, winning an Edison Award in 2004 for its first disc of early, Mannheim school symphonies.

The NDA made its début at the Musikfestspiele Potsdam Sanssouci in 2007, Händel Festspiele Halle with Handel's Water Music in 2008, Thüringer Bachwochen in 2009, and at the Bachfest Leipzig in 2010.

In the Netherlands, the NDA has appeared at Dutch radio's Zaterdagmatinee series, opened the first ever Festival Classique in The Hague in 2007, and has regularly appeared as a guest at the country's major concert halls.

The orchestra regularly co-operates with Dutch radio for concert broadcasts and special projects. For the 2006 NPS/EBU "Amsterdam - City of Music" project, the NDA created and performed a series of concert programmes of newly rediscovered Dutch 18th century symphonies which were broadcast live to more than 30 countries. In 2009, the NDA represented the Netherlands at the Cultural Olympiade in Vancouver and for the Hudson 400 celebrations in New York.

The orchestra became part of the official cultural infrastructure of the city of The Hague in 2009.

Through its research and performing activities, the orchestra has been instrumental in rediscovering and reintroducing the Netherlands' own symphonic tradition.
