= Simon Murphy (conductor) =

Dutch-based Australian conductor and viola player

Simon Francis Murphy (born 26 August 1973) is a Dutch-based, Australian conductor and viola player with a focus on the music of the 18th and early 19th centuries. He is originally from Balmain, Sydney, Australia.

Murphy is notable for his work in rediscovering and reintroducing 18th-century European and symphonic composers, particularly from and related to the Mannheim School (Mannheimer Schule). Murphy has also popularized the previously unknown Dutch 18th-century symphonic tradition through performances on radio and TV broadcasts and the first CD recording of symphonic heritage. In particular, he has focused on 18th-century composers Joseph Schmitt "The Dutch Haydn" and Francesco Zappa, making the first CD recordings and new editions of their symphonic works.

Murphy has won the Dutch Edison Award and Luxembourg's Supersonic Award. In the double role of conductor/soloist (viola), He has appeared at the Concertgebouw Amsterdam, Sydney Festival, the Istanbul Music Festival, and Premiere Performances Hong Kong.

== Education and early years ==
Murphy received his early music tuition as a music scholar at the Scots College in Sydney. He completed his undergraduate studies in the areas of music performance, musicology, and fine arts at the University of Sydney in 1996.

Murphy moved to the Netherlands in 1996, where he studied baroque viola with Alda Stuurop at the Utrechts Conservatorium (between 1996 and 1999) and performed with Frans Brüggen and Gustav Leonhardt in ensembles such as The Orchestra of the 18th-century. Between 2000 and 2005, Murphy was also the violist of The Amsterdam String Quartet. In 2002, he became the chief conductor and artistic director of The Hague's Baroque Orchestra, The New Dutch Academy (NDA).

Murphy made his Amsterdam Het Concertgebouw and Brussels Le Palais des Beaux-Arts (BOZAR / Centre for Fine Arts) conducting débuts in 2004, and his débuts at the Handel Festival, Halle, in 2008 and Bachfest Leipzig in 2010. In 2012, Murphy was appointed music advisor to the Netherlands' Prinsjes Festival. Between 2012 and 2019, he was curator of the Classical & Jazz Stage at the Netherlands' Embassy Festival.

== Performances ==
Murphy's major European festival appearances have included productions for the Händel Festspiele Halle, Bachfest Leipzig, Thüringer Bachwochen, Musikfestspiele Potsdam Sanssouci, Roma Europa Festival, Goldberg Festival, and the Festival van Vlaanderen (Festival of Flanders). At home, Murphy's performances in the Low Countries have included cycles of Stamitz, Mozart, Haydn, Beethoven and Mendelssohn symphonies for Dutch radio at Amsterdam's Het Concertgebouw, Rotterdam's De Doelen, Utrecht's Vredenburg and The Hague's Philipszaal.

== Discography ==
Murphy's discography includes world première presentations of works of 18th-century symphonists Stamitz, Richter, Abel, Reichardt, Schmitt ("The Dutch Haydn"), Graaf, Schwindl and Zappa.

His CD of Corelli's Concerti Grossi, made during the 2003 Utrecht Early Music Festival, was the first disc to present Corelli's own large-scale, authentic, orchestral soundscape, featuring Corelli's preferred instrumentation with lots of continuo instruments (cello, bass, organs, harpsichords, baroque lutes, baroque guitars, archlutes and theorbos) and improvisation. It was voted by Dutch national radio as one of the top 5 highlights in the 30-year history of the festival and was reviewed by the BBC Music Magazine as "the best of both worlds ... the NDA is a big band playing on period instruments".

Murphy's CD albums for PENTATONE include Early Mannheim String Symphonies by Stamitz and Richter Vol. 1 and Vol. 2 (2003 and 2004), Corelli Concerti Grossi (2004), Joseph Schmitt "The Dutch Haydn" Early Symphonies (2006) and Zappa Symphonies / Symphonies from the Court of Orange, The Hague (2009). His 2017 release on PENTATONE, GRAND TOUR Baroque Road Trip, features works by Telemann, Vivaldi, van Wassenaer, Bach, and Murphy performing Telemann's Viola Concerto in G in the double role of soloist/director. His seventh album with PENTATONE, "JET SET! Classical Glitterati" (2019), features Murphy performing the Viola Concerto in E-flat by Zelter in the double role of soloist/conductor alongside first recordings of symphonies by Abel and Reichardt.

Murphy's live performances have been featured on live CD sets by the Dutch national broadcaster and include performances of Mozart and Beethoven Symphonies.

== Other honours ==
For the visit of the Queen Beatrix of the Netherlands to Italy in 2004, Murphy was chosen to programme and conduct the Royal Command Performance given in Rome's Palazzo Quirinale, broadcast live on RAI. Murphy arranged and conducted the music for the 400-year, bilateral celebrations between Australia and the Netherlands in 2006, in both countries. In 2009, he was chosen to represent the Netherlands at the Cultural Olympiade in Vancouver, Canada and at the Hudson 400 celebrations in New York. In 2012, he represented the Netherlands at the bilateral celebrations of 40 years of diplomatic relations between the Kingdom of the Netherlands and People's Republic of China. In 2016, he opened the official bilateral Dutch Australian 1616 - 2016 celebrations with a concert performance in the Sydney Festival at the Sydney City Recital Hall attended by the Governor General of Australia and the Dutch Ambassador, broadcast by ABC Classic FM.

In 2004, Murphy was awarded the Netherlands' Edison Music Award.

In 2005, his performance of Mozart Symphony No. 41 (Jupiter) in the Utrecht Early Music Festival was chosen by the Dutch world service (RNW) as one of the highlights of the entire Dutch cultural season 2005–2006 and was featured in a series of live discs by the RNW. His performance of Beethoven's Symphony no. 1 and Haydn's Symphony no. 104 "London" in 2007 in the concert hall De Doelen, Rotterdam was chosen by Dutch broadcaster NPS as a highlight out of hundreds of hours of live recorded concerts in the radio's archives and was featured in 2010 in a series of live NPS portrait CDs in co-operation together with the low countries' classical music magazine Luister.

In 2019, Murphy received the Charles Burney Award from the Dutch national Prins Bernhard Cultuurfonds.

== Recitals ==
Alongside his conducting activities, Murphy is active as a viola soloist, recitalist and chamber musician, also performing on Bach's own hand-held violoncello piccolo (also known as the viola da spalla or viola pomposa). On this instrument, he was invited to give a special of recitals in original Bach castles as part of the Bachfest Leipzig and Thüringer Bachwochen.
