= Camille Thomas =

French-Belgian cellist (born 1988)

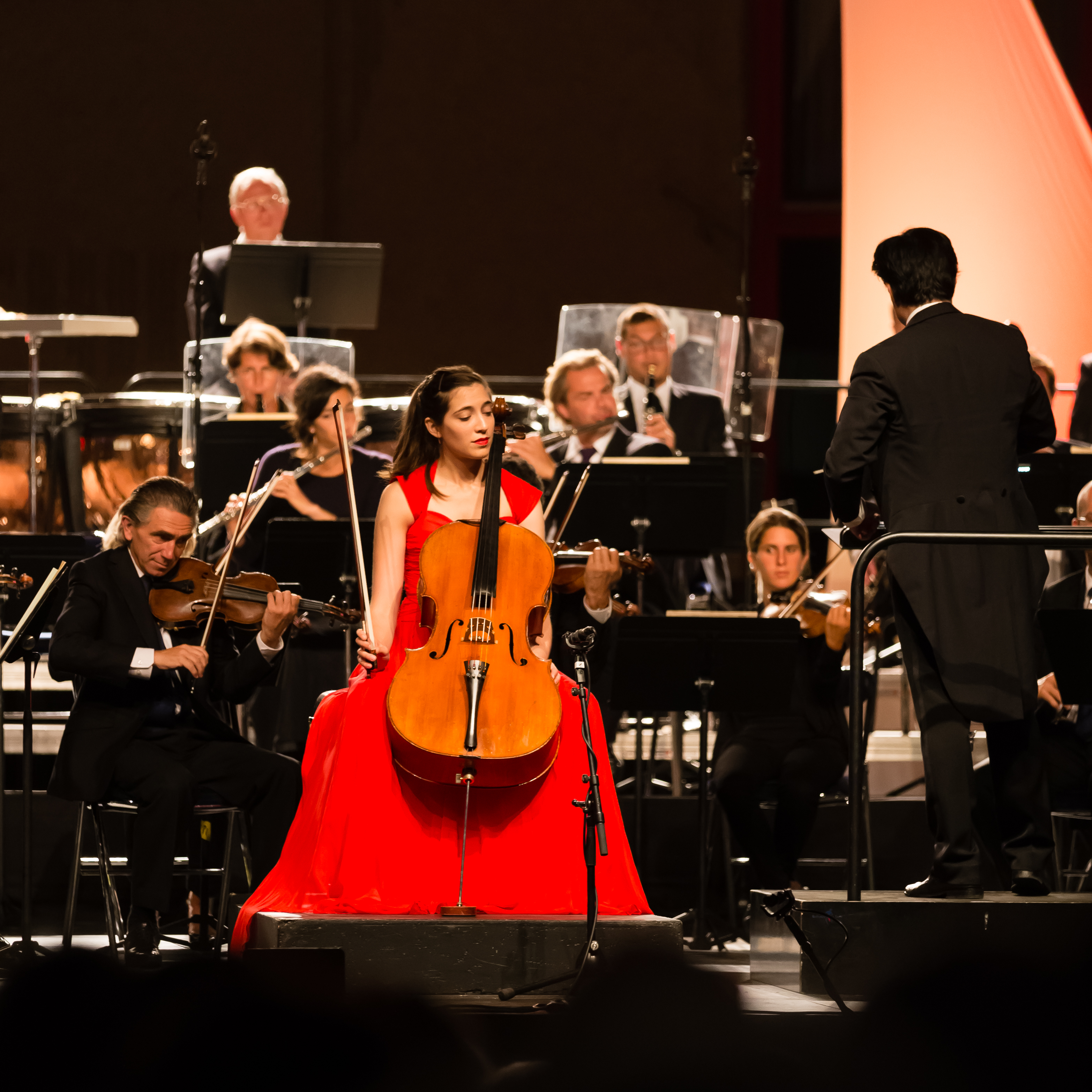
- Thomas at Rennes in 2014 with the Brittany Symphony Orchestra.

Background information
- Born: May 1988 (age 38); Paris, France
- Genres: Classical
- Instrument: 1730 De Munck-Feuermann Stradivarius
- Website: camillethomas.com

Camille Thomas (born May 1988 in Paris, France) is a Franco-Belgian cellist.

== Biography ==
Camille Thomas began studying the cello at the age of 4. At 10 years old, she studied under Marcel Bardon at the Conservatoire national de région de Paris, where, at 16 years old, she was awarded her first competition prize for cello performance. She then studied under Philippe Muller at the national music school at Aulnay-sous-Bois, before heading to Germany to study under Stephan Forck and then Frans Helmerson at the Hochschule für Musik Hanns Eisler in Berlin. She subsequently studied under Wolfgang-Emmanuel Schmidt at the Hochschule für Musik Franz Liszt in Weimar. She participated in numerous masterclasses and was able to learn from many renowned cellists, among them David Geringas, Steven Isserlis, Wolfgang Boettcher, Natalia Shakovskaya, Ralph Kirschbaum, Boris Baraz, and Tabea Zimmermann.

Having been noticed by Seiji Ozawa and Steven Isserlis, Thomas was invited to participate in their respective festivals in 2012,. She has performed throughout Europe, notably at the Gaveau Hall in Paris, the Victoria Hall in Geneva, the Palais des beaux-arts de Bruxelles, the Jerusalem Music Center, and the Konzerthaus de Berlin. She has performed in various festivals such as the festival Pablo Casals de Prades, the Strasbourg festival, Encuentro de Musica de Santander, and the Amsterdam Cello Biennale.

Thomas has performed as a soloist alongside the Sinfonia Varsovia, the Baden Baden Philharmonic Orchestra, the Orchestre national de Lille, the Philharmonisches Staatsorchester Hamburg, the Picardy Orchestra, the Slovak Philharmonic, the Slovak Radio Symphonic Orchestra, the Lucerne Festival Strings, the Young Belgian Strings, the Brittany Symphonic Orchestra, the Orchestre philharmonique royal de Liège, the North Czech Philharmonic, the Orchestre Lamoureux, the French Republican Guard Band, the United Nations orchestra, La Baule Symphonic, and the Sofia Philharmonic Orchestra under the direction of Nayden Todorov and Charles Dutoit. She has performed with the Junge Sinfonie Berlin under the direction of conductors Kent Nagano, Theodor Guschlbauer, Arie van Beek, Darrell Ang, Fayçal Karoui, Mathieu Herzog, Jean-Christophe Ferreaux, Pavel Baleff, Kriistina Poska, Debora Waldman, Giedre Slekyte, Charles Olivieri-Munroe, Antoine Marguier, Rastislav Stur, and Aziz Shokhakimov.

== Prizes and honours ==
Thomas has been awarded numerous prizes at national and international competitions such as the Léopold Bellan competition in Paris, the Edmond Baert competition in Bruxelles, and the 7th international Antonio Janigro competition in Croatia. She was also selected for the 2018 Forbes 30 Under 30 list.

In 2010, Thomas was awarded a number of distinctions. She was awarded the title of "Classical revelation" (Révélation classique) by Adami and became laureate of the Bleustein-Blanchet vocational foundation, the Yamaha Music Foundation of Europe, the DAAD, Villa Musica, Live MusicNow, the Carl-Flesch Akademie, the Mannheim Sinfonima Stiftung, and the AMOPA Berthier Prize.

In 2012, she was awarded a prize from the Fondation Banque Populaire.

In May 2013, her first album, A Century of Russian Colours, was released under the Fuga Libera record label. The album, dedicated to 20th century Russian music, was recorded in collaboration with the Swiss pianist Beatrice Berrut. It received accolades from international press.

In 2014, Thomas was awarded the title of Revelation, Instrumental soloist, at the Victoires de la musique classique. She was selected by the Musiq'3 – RTBF radio station to represent Belgium at the European Broadcasting Union competition, where she was awarded first place and declared "New Talent of the Year".

In 2015, she was invited to appear on ARTE "Les Stars de Demain" by Rolando Villazón.

In 2016, her second album, Réminiscences, was released on the Dolce Volta label. Themed on an imaginary recital of late 19th and early 20th century music, the album revolves around the cello transcription of the Franck violin sonata and Eugène Ysaÿe sonata for solo cello, accompanied by pieces by Fauré and Duparc. It received a CHOC prize from Classica and an ECHO Klassik PREIS.

In 2017, she signed an exclusive international contract with Deutsche Grammophon, the first female cellist to sign with the record label. Her first recording with them was released in October 2017, consisting of works by Saint-Saëns and Offenbach, performed with the Orchestre national de Lille under conductor Alexandre Bloch.

== Other work ==
In addition to her work as a soloist, Thomas is a passionate chamber musician. In 2011 and 2012, she was selected to participate in the Seiji Ozawa International Academy in Switzerland. She has performed regularly with them alongside musicians such as Beatrice Berrut, Julien Libeer, Frank Braley, and Gérard Caussé.

In 2011, Thomas appeared in the film Un baiser papillon, taking on the role of a cellist and performing Vivaldi concerti accompanied by the Orchestre des Solistes Français.

== Instruments ==
Thomas has played a 1788 Ferdinand Gagliano cello, dubbed the Château Pape Clément, loaned to her by Bernard Magrez, along with a bow by Eugène Sartory on extended loan from the King Baudouin Foundation – Bollandsee Fund.

Since 24 September 2019, she has played the De Munck-Feuermann, a 1730 Stradivarius cello, loaned by the Nippon Music Foundation for a period of one year.
