= Daniel Müller-Schott =

German cellist (born 1976)

- Born: 2 November 1976 (age 49); Munich, Bavaria, Germany
- Occupation: Classical cellist

Daniel Müller-Schott (born 2 November 1976) is a German cellist.

== Early life ==
Born in Munich, he studied with Walter Nothas, Austrian cellist Heinrich Schiff and British cellist Steven Isserlis. Violinist Anne-Sophie Mutter personally coached him in her foundation, thanks to which he spent time studying with Mstislav Rostropovich. Aged 15, he aroused enthusiasm by winning the first prize in the International Tchaikovsky Competition for Young Musicians in Moscow in 1992.

== Career ==
Müller-Schott plays a cello by Matteo Goffriller, Venice, 1727. He has worked with conductors such as Vladimir Ashkenazy, Charles Dutoit, Christoph Eschenbach, Kurt Masur, Sakari Oramo and André Previn. He recorded and released the Mozart Piano Trios in 2006 with Anne-Sophie Mutter and André Previn. With Angela Hewitt, he has recorded Beethoven's complete works for cello and piano.

== Recordings ==
- 2000 Johann Sebastian Bach – 6 Suiten für Violoncello solo; Daniel Müller-Schott
- 2002 Music for Cello and Piano – Debussy, Poulenc und Franck Sonaten, Ravel Habanera; Daniel Müller-Schott, Robert Kulek, BBC Music Magazine CD of the Month
- 2003 Haydn – Konzerte Nr. 1 & Nr. 2, Beethoven – Romanzen Nr. 1 & 2; Daniel Müller-Schott, Australian Chamber Orchestra
- 2004 Joseph Joachim Raff – Konzerte für Violoncello und Orchester Nr. 1 & 2, "Begegnung" – Duo op. 59 für Violoncello und Klavier; Daniel Müller-Schott, Robert Kulek, Bamberger Symphoniker, Hans Stadlmair
- 2004 Khachaturian – Konzert für Violine, Violoncello und Orchester; Daniel Müller-Schott, Arabella Steinbacher, City of Birmingham Symphony Orchestra, Sakari Oramo
- 2005 Robert Schumann – Werke für Violoncello und Klavier; Daniel Müller-Schott, Robert Kulek
- 2006 Elgar, Walton – Cello Concertos; Daniel Müller-Schott, André Previn, Oslo Philharmonic Orchestra, Preis der deutschen Schallplattenkritik, The Times CD of the Week
- 2006 Felix Mendelssohn Bartholdy (1809–1847) – The Piano Trios 1 & 2; Daniel Müller-Schott, Julia Fischer, Jonathan Gilad, on PENTATONE (PTC 5186085). Choc du Monde de La Musique.
- 2006 Franz Schubert – Streichquintett D 956, D 87; Daniel Müller-Schott, Vogler Quartett
- 2006 Wolfgang Amadeus Mozart – Klaviertrios; Daniel Müller-Schott, Anne-Sophie Mutter, André Previn
- 2007 Johann Sebastian Bach Gamba Sonatas; Daniel Müller-Schott, Angela Hewitt, The Gramophone Editor's Choice
- 2007 Johannes Brahms – Double Concerto for Violin and Cello in A minor, Op. 102, Violin Concerto in D, Op. 77; Daniel Müller-Schott, Julia Fischer, Yakov Kreizberg, Netherlands Philharmonic Orchestra Amsterdam, on PENTATONE (PTC 5186066). Gramophone Editor's Choice, Preis der deutschen Schallplattenkritik.
- 2008 Dmitri Shostakovich Cello Concertos No.1 and 2, Yakov Kreizberg, Bavarian Radio Symphony Orchestra, BBC Music Magazine CD of the Month, Deutscher Schallplattenpreis 3/2008
- 2009 Schumann and Volkmann Cello Concertos, NDR Symphony Orchestra, Christoph Eschenbach
- 2010 Mendelssohn Works for Cello and Piano, Daniel Müller-Schott, Jonathan Gilad
- 2011 Britten The Cello Suites
- 2012 Prokofiev / Britten – The Cello Symphonies
- 2014 Antonín Dvořák – The Cello Works
- 2015 Shostakovich / Britten / Prokofiev Cello Sonatas with Francesco Piemontesi
- 2016 Duo Sessions with Julia Fischer
- 2017 #CelloReimagined – Cello Konzerte von Bach, Haydn und Mozart, Daniel Müller-Schott, L'arte del Mondo, Werner Erhardt
- 2018 TRIP TO RUSSIA – Tchaikovsky, Glazunov, Rimsky-Korsakov; Daniel Müller-Schott, Deutsches Symphonie-Orchester Berlin, Aziz Shokhakimov
