= Francesco Zappa =

Italian composer

Francesco Zappa ([franˈtʃeskɔ dˈdzappa], 1717 most likely in Milan – 17 January 1803 in The Hague) was an Italian cellist and composer who lived most of his adult life in The Hague, the Dutch Republic.

He was highly regarded for his virtuoso cello playing and his compositions were published and distributed throughout Europe. Zappa was of importance to the musical life of the Netherlands, and made substantial contributions to the quality, vibrancy and international outlook of The Hague's 18th-century music scene as a performer, composer, concert organiser and teacher.

== Life ==
Little is known about Zappa's early life. Zappa was first employed by the Sicilian Count Catani, to whom he dedicated his first work, 6 Trio sonatas. He worked for the Duke of York, giving him music lessons during the Duke's stay in Italy, from November 1763 to the middle of 1764, listing himself as maestro di (musica) to the Duke on the title page of his Trio sonatas Opus 2.

In mid-1764, Zappa embarked on a tour of Europe with his friend Francesco Pasquale Ricci, visiting Dresden, Frankfurt, Mainz and Mannheim. In September 1764, the two performed concerts around the Netherlands. At the conclusion of this tour, Zappa established himself in The Hague, where he was subsequently employed by the Court of the Prince of Orange with regularity for the next four decades, first appearing on the payroll for the court's Winter concert season in 1766.

In 1771 he played a series of concerts in Germany, visiting Danzig and, on 22 September, Frankfurt am Main. It is likely that he was also active in Paris in the 1770s. According to Mendel (1879), he undertook another tour of Germany in 1781, and with "his gentle and beautiful sound" inspired wonder in all who listened.

At the end of the 1780s Zappa was still gainfully employed as a music master based in The Hague (Maître de musique à la Haye), as noted in the 1788 manuscript of his Quartetto concertante. Other documentation confirms his continued presence in the city. He received a permanent Dutch residence permit on 1 August 1791.

In The Hague's Binnenhof on 2 November 1794, Zappa played in the court's last concert before the stadholder's family abdicated, fleeing to England in the face of the invading French army, which put an end to the court's music programme.

== Musical output ==
Zappa's oeuvre includes symphonies, trios, sonatas, divertimenti and songs. His compositions often feature a prominent role for the cello.

Frank Zappa (1940–1993) found out about him and performed Francesco Zappa's Opus 1 trios and Opus 4 sonatas on a digital synthesizer called the Synclavier. The recordings were released on the album Francesco Zappa in 1984. Frank Zappa described the album as "His (Francesco Zappa's) First Digital Recording in over 200 Years". While assumed by many to have been related, Frank Zappa stated in The Real Frank Zappa Book that in fact they were not.

The first recording of Francesco Zappa's symphonies was made by the New Dutch Academy directed by Simon Murphy; PENTATONE PTC 5186 365, released in 2009. The recording features American Baroque cellist Caroline Kang in the solo role in Zappa's "cello symphonies".

== Works ==
- Duets:
  - 6 Sonatas for keyboard/harpsichord and violin, Opus 6 (Paris, n.d.)
  - 6 Duos (violin, cello/2 violins) (Paris, n.d.)
  - Duo for 2 cellos, Ms., m. 5740, Sammlung Hausbibliothek
- Trio sonatas, 2 violins and bass:
  - 6 Trios (London, 1765), Opus 1 (The Hague, n.d.)
  - 6 Trios Opus 2 (London, ca. 1767)
  - 6 Trios Opus 3 (Paris, n.d.)
  - 6 Trios Opus 4 (London, n.d.)
  - 6 Sonates à deux Violons & Basse, (The Hague, n.d.), Sammlung Thulemeyer
- Other Works:
  - 6 Symphonies (Paris, n.d.)
  - 2 Romances, 1 violin (The Hague, n.d.)
  - Sonata for cello, Mus. ms. 23490, Berlin Stiftung Preußischer Kulturbesitz
  - Sinfonia con Violoncello obbligato No. 1 for 2 violins, viola, violoncello obbligato, 2 oboes, 2 horns, Ms., m. 5737, Sammlung Hausbibliothek
  - Quartetto Concertante for 2 violins, viola, cello, "composta all Aya li 8 Liuglio 1788," Ms. m. 5740, Sammlung Hausbibliothek
  - 7 Pieces, 2 for piano, 5 for 1 violin, piano, Opus 11 (The Hague, n.d.)
  - 2 Sonata à tre for violin, violoncello obbligato, bass, in Early Cello Series, xxiii (London, 1983)
  - Other works: Vienna Gesellschaft der Musikfreunde, Bad Schwalbach Evangelisches Pfarrarchiv, Milan Conservatorio di Musica Giuseppe Verdi

== Discography of recordings ==
- Frank Zappa: The Barking Pumpkin Digital Gratification Consort – Francesco Zappa (1984). Barking Pumpkin Records, ST-74202. LP, cassette, CD.
  - "6 Trios, Opus 1".
  - "6 Trios, Opus 4".
    - "Opus 1, No. 1" and "Opus 1, No. 2" also available on Modern Divertimento 4 - Classic Tomorrow (1986). Zeitmagazin, 296 258. LP.
    - "Opus 1: No. 3 2nd Movement: Presto" and "Opus 1: No. 4 2nd Movement: Allegro" also available on Strictly Genteel: A "Classical" Introduction to Frank Zappa (1997). Rykodisc, RCD 10578. CD.
- Trio Polyphonica – Vivaldi, Bach, Zappa, Haydn (1988). No label. Cassette.
  - "Sonata à tre".
    - Reissued on CD in 2018 by Move Records, MD 3430.
- various – Frank You, Thank! Tributo italiano a Frank Zappa Vol. 2 (2003). Il manifesto, CD 111. CD.
  - Duo Penazzi-Coen – "Opus 1: No. 2 2nd Movement: Minuetto grazioso".
- Simon Murphy: New Dutch Academy – Zappa Symphonies (2009). PentaTone Classics, PTC 5186 365. Hybrid Super Audio CD.
  - "Symphony in B flat 'The Cello Symphony'" and "Symphony in D".
- Vanni Moretto: Atalanta Fugiens – Francesco Zappa: Six Symphonies (2012). Sony Music, 88697901562. CD.
  - "6 Symphonies".
    - "Sinfonia n. 4 in Do Maggiore" also available on:
      - Mozart, J.Ch. Bach, Pugnani, Zingarelli, Zappa: Il Settecento tra Milano a Torino (2014). Amadeus, AM 287-2. CD.
      - In viaggio co Mozart da Milano a Torino (2014). Azimut. CD.
- Alla Maniera Italiana Ensemble; Giacomo Coletti, violin; Anna Camporini, cello – Francesco Zappa: 6 Duets for Violin & Cello (2021). Urania Records, LDV 14075. CD.
  - "6 Sonates à deux Violons & Basse".

== Further references ==
- Francesco Zappa, Symphonies, edited by Simon Murphy, The Hague, 2007
- Francesco Zappa, Symphonies, Simon Murphy (conductor), New Dutch Academy, PentaTone Classics SA-CD, 2009
- Simon Murphy and Cornelia Klugkist "ZAPPA IN THE NETHERLANDS New Discoveries on the life of Francesco Zappa (1717 – 1803), Cellist and Composer at the 18th Century Court of Orange in The Hague" Spring 2013 at http://www.newdutchacademy.nl/index.php?option=com_content&view=article&id=96:zappa&catid=40:articles&Itemid=55
- Francesco Zappa, "Sinfonie", critical edition by Jacopo Franzoni (Milano: Ricordi, 2010 - Archivio della sinfonia milanese, 3)
- Jacopo Franzoni, "Chi Era Francesco Zappa?" in "Antonio Brioschi e il nuovo stile musicale del Settecento lombardo" by Davide Daolmi and Cesare Fertonani (Milano: LED, 2010)
- Karl-Heinz Köhler. "Francesco Zappa" in Friedrich Blume (ed.). Die Musik in Geschichte und Gegenwart (Kassel, Basel et al. 1968), Band 14
- H. Mendel & A. Reissmann, (eds.). Musikalisches Conversations-Lexikon (Berlin, 1870–79), Band 11, 1879)
- David Ocker. "The Musical Times of Francesco Zappa," liner notes from the album Francesco Zappa, Barking Pumpkin Records, 1984
- Guido Salvetti & Valerie Walden in Stanley Sadie, (ed.). The New Grove Dictionary Of Music & Musicians (London, New York, Massachusetts 2001), 2nd. ed., ISBN 1-56159-239-0
- E. van der Straeten. The History of the Violoncello (London, 1915/R1971), quoted by Köhler (1968)
