= Monte-Carlo Philharmonic Orchestra =

Symphony orchestra in Monaco

The Monte-Carlo Philharmonic Orchestra (French: Orchestre Philharmonique de Monte-Carlo, OPMC) is an orchestra based in the Principality of Monaco. The orchestra gives concerts primarily in the Auditorium Rainier III, but also performs at the Salle des Princes in the Grimaldi Forum.

== History ==
The orchestra was founded in 1856 and gave its first concert on 14 December 1856, with an ensemble of 15 musicians, at the "Maison de jeux" (the future casino), under the direction of Alexandre Hermann. By 1874, the orchestra had increased in size to 70 musicians, in particular during the leadership of Eusèbe Lucas. In 1953, Prince Rainier III had ordered the renaming of the ensemble to Orchestre National de l'Opéra de Monte-Carlo. The orchestra acquired its current name in 1980, again through Rainier III.

Past principal conductors of the orchestra have included Paul Paray, Louis Frémaux, Igor Markevitch, Lovro von Matačić, Lawrence Foster, Gianluigi Gelmetti, James DePreist, Marek Janowski, and Yakov Kreizberg. Kreizberg had originally been signed to a contract of five years, but his tenure was truncated by his death in March 2011. In March 2012, the OPMC and its then-president, Princess Caroline of Monaco, announced the return of Gelmetti to the orchestra as chef référent to provide interim artistic leadership for the orchestra. In January 2013, the OPMC formalised the full re-appointment of Gelmetti as its artistic director and music director. Gelmetti concluded his second OPMC tenure after the 2015–2016 season and subsequently took the title of honorary conductor.

Kazuki Yamada first guest-conducted the OPMC in 2011. In the fall of 2013, he became the OPMC's principal guest conductor. In April 2015, the OPMC announced the appointment of Yamada as its next principal conductor and artistic director, effective September 2016, with an initial contract of three years. In September 2020, the OPMC announced a further contract extension for Yamada through the 2023–2024 season. In June 2023, the OPMC announced the most recent extension of Yamada's contract as its music director, through August 2026. Yamada concluded his tenure as OPMC music director in August 2026.

In December 2025, the OPMC announced the appointment of Nathalie Stutzmann as its next music director and artistic director, effective with the 2026–2027 season, with an initial contract of four years. She had guest-conducted with the OPMC since 2014. Stutzmann is the first female conductor to be named music director and artistic director of the OPMC.

== Principal Conductors ==
- Alexandre Hermann
- Carlo Allegri (1860–1861)
- Eusèbe Lucas (1861–1871)
- Arthur Steck (1885–1894)
- Léon Jehin (1894–1928)
- Paul Paray (1928–1933)
- Henri Tomasi (1946–1947)
- Louis Frémaux (1956–1965)
- Claudio Scimone (1965–1967)
- Igor Markevitch (1967–1972)
- Lovro von Matačić (1972–1979)
- Lawrence Foster (1980–1990)
- Gianluigi Gelmetti (1990–1991)
- James DePreist (1994–1998)
- Marek Janowski (2000–2006)
- Yakov Kreizberg (2009–2011)
- Gianluigi Gelmetti (2013–2016)
- Kazuki Yamada (2016–2026)
- Nathalie Stutzmann (2026–present)

== Selected discography ==
- Fantasies, Rhapsodies and Daydreams. Works by Camille Saint-Saëns, Maurice Ravel, Ralph Vaughan Williams, Pablo de Sarasate, Jules Massenet. Arabella Steinbacher, Lawrence Foster, Orchestre Philharmonique de Monte-Carlo. PENTATONE PTC 5186536 (2016).
