= Joseph Schmitt (composer) =

German/Dutch composer, conductor and music theorist

- Born: Gernsheim
- Baptized: 18 March 1734
- Died: 28 May 1791 (aged 57); Amsterdam
- Occupations: Composer; Conductor; Music publisher; Music theorist; Music pedagogue

Georg Adam Joseph Schmitt (Georgius Adamus Josephus; baptised on 18 March 1734, died on 28 May 1791) was a German/Dutch composer, conductor, music director, publisher, music theorist and pedagogue. He is also known as "The Dutch Haydn".

== Life and career ==
Schmitt was born in Gernsheim. He was a student of Carl Friedrich Abel, who was a student of J. S. Bach and a mentor of Mozart, and probably also had close contact with composers and performers at the court in Mannheim. In 1753, at age 19, Schmitt was admitted into the clergy. For a period of around 20 years worked as a musical priest at the Cistercian Eberbach Abbey (Kloster Eberbach) in the Rheingau, where he composed a broad range of music, from sacred to secular, chamber to symphonic.

In the early 1770s, Schmitt moved to Amsterdam, where he already had compositions published by leading European music publishing firm, the Hummel brothers. Schmitt established himself quickly in the city, becoming music director at the Felix Meritis society, where he worked for the next two decades, and opening his own publishing firm which subsequently introduced major works by composers such as Mozart to northern Europe for the first time. In his various roles Schmitt became the most important figure in Dutch musical life in the second half of the 18th century.

Schmitt died in Amsterdam.

== Work ==
As a composer, the style of Schmitt's works is widely considered to be sparkling and cosmopolitan. Many believe it is influenced by Abel, Bach's sons and the Mannheimers.

As a historical figure, Schmitt has largely been ignored by the Dutch, despite his pioneering role in the realisation of the country's first purpose-built concert hall, the Felix Meritis. The hall opened in October 1788 with Schmitt conducting the inaugural performance. In the 19th century, the hall was the central point of Dutch music life and hosted the Dutch débuts of luminary performers including Clara Schumann and Brahms.

Schmitt's compositions had been largely forgotten, until recently. Dutch-based Australian conductor Simon Murphy has been responsible for reintroducing Schmitt's music to the world in performance, through broadcasts, on disc and in new editions.

In the 18th century, Schmitt's music was particularly popular in northern Europe, Scandinavia and on the east coast of the U.S. Listings of performances of his orchestral works can be found on 18th-century programmes from U.S. concert societies, and Schmitt's works are included in the listings of the holdings of most 18th-century European court, orchestral and music society libraries.

== CD recordings of Schmitt's works ==
Together with The Hague's Baroque Orchestra, The New Dutch Academy, conductor Simon Murphy has made the world-première recordings of Schmitt's early symphonic and chamber music (PENTATONE, 2006). These recordings include Schmitt's first Dutch written and published symphony, the Symphony in G c. 1772, and the colourful, Symphony in E flat, "The Hurdy Gurdy", written in Eberbach in the mid-1760s.

== Performances ==
Together with the New Dutch Academy, conductor Simon Murphy gave the modern-day premiere performances of Schmitt's symphonies and chamber music at a series of concert events in 2002 and 2003 at Schmitt's former workplace in Amsterdam, the Felix Meritis. Murphy performed Schmitt's symphonies and chamber music, again at the Felix Meritis, for the Dutch national broadcaster's radiophonic festival in 2006, Amsterdam – City of Music, broadcast live by the EBU around the world. Since then, Murphy has further championed Schmitt's orchestral works including in concerts at the Concertgebouw Amsterdam and for the Holland Festival of Early Music Utrecht.

The Rheingau Musik Festival presented a performance of his Missa solemnis at Eberbach Abbey. The Johann Rosenmüller Ensemble with soloists Heike Heilmann, Franz Vitzthum, Georg Poplutz and Markus Flaig, conducted by Arno Paduch, performed the work in the church for which it was composed and was not heard since 1803, combined with psalms and a Te Deum by Antonio Caldara.
