= Robert Kulek =

Robert Kulek is an American classical pianist. He is of Latvian ancestry and currently resides in the Netherlands. He has recorded for multiple labels including EMI and Pentatone, and his recording of French sonatas was nominated for the Edison Award.

== Career ==
Robert Kulek studied at the Mannes College of Music, in New York, then the Guildhall School of Music and Drama, in London, and at Yale University, where he studied with Boris Berman and Claude Frank, earning a degree in Performance.

Kulek has performed as a solo pianist, chamber musician, and soloist with orchestra in many prestigious venues, such as the Philharmonie in Berlin, the Concertgebouw in Amsterdam, the Musikverein in Vienna, the Mozarteum concert hall in Salzburg and Casals and Ohji Halls in Tokyo. He has also performed at a number of festivals, including Schwetzingen, Mecklenburg, Nymphenburgersommer and Rheingau in Germany; Lucerne and GAIA in Switzerland; Colmar and St. Denis in France; Storioni and Zeist in the Netherlands; Ravinia in Chicago; and the Vancouver Chamber Music Festival.

Kulek also teaches to private students, and has given master classes in Japan and at the Zeist Festival in the Netherlands.

== Recordings ==
Robert Kulek has recorded for the EMI, Orfeo, Pentatone, Avie and Tudor labels. A recording of French sonatas, recorded with cellist Daniel Mueller-Schott, was nominated for the Edison Award and was selected as CD of the Month in both The Strad and BBC Music Magazine. A recording of sonatas by Poulenc, Fauré and Ravel with violinist Arabella Steinbacher was a Strad Selection of the Month. A 2011 recording of French and Russian sonatas with violinist Augustin Hadelich was “Editor’s Choice” in Gramophone Magazine. His most recent recordings are for Pentatone, where he has recorded a disc of works by Franck, Richard Strauss, and Brahms's complete works for piano and violin, with violinist Arabella Steinbacher. This recording was awarded 5 stars in both BBC Music Magazine and Diapason.

== Selected discography ==
- Johannes Brahms - Complete works for Piano and Violin Arabella Steinbacher, Robert Kulek. PENTATONE PTC 5186367 (2011).
- Sonatas for Violin and Piano by César Franck and Richard Strauss. Arabella Steinbacher, Robert Kulek. PENTATONE PTC 5186470 (2014).

== Personal life ==
He lives in the Netherlands.
