= Arabella Steinbacher =

German classical violinist (born 1981)

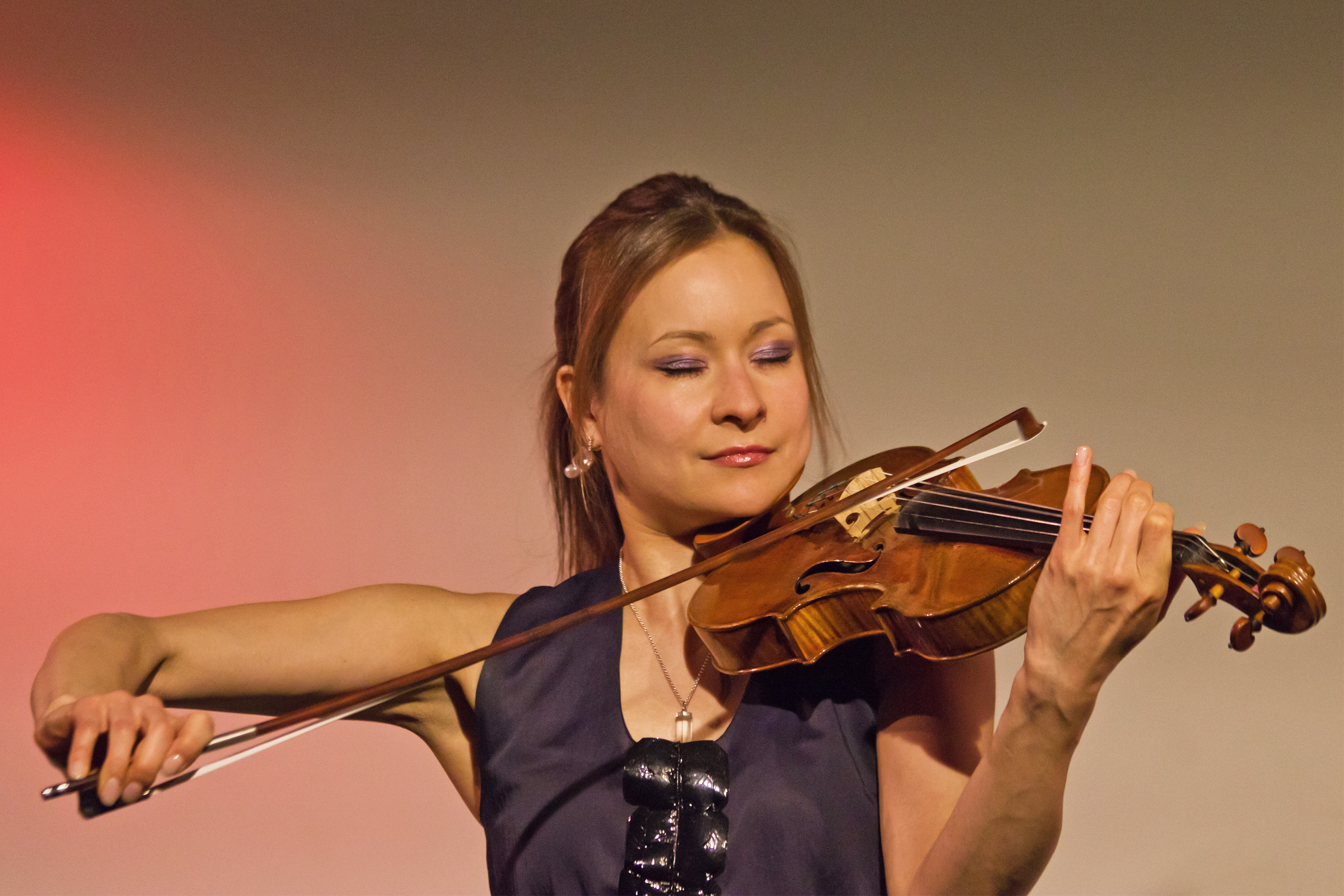
- Steinbacher in 2014
- Born: 14 November 1981 (age 44); Munich
- Education: Munich College of Music
- Occupation: classical violinist
- Awards: 2000 International Joseph Joachim Violin Competition (3rd Prize); 2001 Förderpreis des Freistaates Bayern; 2001 Scholarship "Anne-Sophie Mutter's circle of friends"

Arabella Miho Steinbacher (born 14 November 1981) is a German classical violinist.

== Biography ==
Steinbacher was born in Munich to a Japanese mother and a German father. When she was three, her mother read that a German violin teacher had recently returned from Japan after studying the Suzuki method. Steinbacher started violin lessons at that time. When she was nine years old, she was enrolled at the Munich College of Music and mentored by Ana Chumachenco.

Steinbacher came into contact with Ivry Gitlis, and took part in master classes by Dorothy DeLay and Kurt Sassmannshaus in Aspen, Colorado. She won several important prizes (the Joseph Joachim International Violin Competition in Hanover), and a grant from the Free State of Bavaria in 2001, then became a student of Anne-Sophie Mutter's Freundeskreis ("Circle of friends").

Steinbacher frequently appears with world-class orchestras around the globe including the New York Philharmonic, Boston Symphony Orchestra, London Symphony Orchestra, Philharmonia Orchestra, Chicago Symphony Orchestra, and the Cleveland Orchestra. She has made acclaimed performances with the NDR Symphony Orchestra, Leipzig Gewandhaus Orchestra, São Paulo Symphony, Orchestre National de France, Vienna Symphony, Seoul Philharmonic Orchestra, NHK Symphony Orchestra, the Bavarian Radio Symphony Orchestra, Hong Kong Philharmonic Orchestra and the Auckland Philharmonia. She has collaborated with conductors including Lorin Maazel, Christoph von Dohnányi, Riccardo Chailly, Herbert Blomstedt, Zubin Mehta, Christoph Eschenbach, Charles Dutoit, Marek Janowski, Yannick Nézet-Séguin, Thomas Hengelbrock and Giordano Bellincampi.

Her recording with Berlin Radio Symphony Orchestra and Vladimir Jurowski features the Hindemith and Britten violin concertos. Arabella Steinbacher has been recording exclusively for PENTATONE since 2009. Among many international and national music prizes and nominations, she has been twice awarded the ECHO Klassik.

As CARE ambassador, Steinbacher is driven to use music as a means to uplift and support those in need. She launched a December 2011 Japan tour in response to the tsunami disaster earlier that year. The DVD release Arabella Steinbacher – Music of Hope featured her outreach, and youth recitals from this tour and was released shortly after.

Steinbacher currently plays the Booth Stradivarius (1716) provided by the Nippon Music Foundation.

She married Wolfgang Schaufler, publisher at Universal Edition, Vienna, in 2017.

In April 2023, Steinbacher premiered a new violin concerto, "To beam in distant heavens...", by composer Georges Lentz to great acclaim.

== Prizes and honours ==
- 2000 International Joseph Joachim Violin Competition (3rd Prize)
- 2001 Förderpreis des Freistaates Bayern
- 2001 Scholarship "Anne-Sophie Mutter's circle of friends"

== Recordings ==
- 2004 Aram Khachaturian – Violin Concerto and Cello Concerto; Arabella Steinbacher, Daniel Müller-Schott, City of Birmingham Symphony Orchestra, Sakari Oramo Orfeo C 623 041 A
- 2005 Darius Milhaud – Violin Concerto No.1, Violin Concerto No.2, Concertino; Münchner Rundfunkorchester, Pinchas Steinberg Orfeo C 646 051 A
- 2006 Violino Latino – Arabella Steinbacher, Peter von Wienhardt Orfeo C 686 061 A
- 2006 Dmitri Shostakovich – Violin Concerto No.1, Violin Concerto No.2. Symphonieorchester des Bayrischen Rundfunks Orfeo C 687 061 A
- 2008 Sonatas for violin and piano/"Gypsy", Poulenc, Fauré, Ravel – Robert Kulek Orfeo C 739 081 A
- 2009 Beethoven – Violin Concerto, Alban Berg – Violin Concerto – Andris Nelsons Orfeo C 778 091 A
- 2009 Dvorak – Violin Concerto, Romanze f-moll, Karol Szymanowski – Violin Concerto No. 1. Marek Janowski, Rundfunk-Sinfonieorchester Berlin, Radio Symphony Orchestra Berlin. PENTATONE PTC 5186353.
- 2010 Béla Bartók – Violin Concerto No. 1, Violin Concerto No. 2. Marek Janowski, Orchestre de la Suisse Romande. PENTATONE PTC 5186350.
- 2011 Johannes Brahms – Violin Concerto Orfeo C 752 111 A
- 2011 Johannes Brahms – Complete Works for Violin and Piano. Robert Kulek. PENTATONE PTC 5186367.
- 2012 Sergei Prokofiev – Violin Concerto No. 1, Violin Concerto No. 2, Sonata for Solo Violin. Vasily Petrenko, Russian National Orchestra. PENTATONE PTC 5186395.
- 2013 Erich Wolfgang Korngold – Violin Concerto, Ernest Chausson – Poème, Max Bruch – Violin Concerto No. 1. Lawrence Foster, Gulbenkian Orchestra. PENTATONE PTC 5186503.
- 2014 Wolfgang Amadeus Mozart – Violin Concerto No. 3, Violin Concerto No. 4, Violin Concerto No. 5. Daniel Dodds, Festival Strings Lucerne. PENTATONE PTC 5186479.
- 2014 Creating Timeless Classics. Martin Helmchen, Arabella Steinbacher, Nareh Arghamanyan, Mari Kodama, Julia Fischer, Russian National Orchestra, Concertgebouw Chamber Orchestra, Academy of St Martin in the Fields, Orchestre de la Suisse Romande. Pieces by Robert Schumann, Peter Ilyich Tchaikovsky, Johann Sebastian Bach, Ludwig van Beethoven, Howard Blake. PENTATONE PTC 5186531.
- 2014 César Franck – Violin Sonata, Richard Strauss – Violin Sonata. Robert Kulek. PENTATONE PTC 5186470.
- 2015 Felix Mendelssohn – Violin Concerto, Pyotr Ilyich Tchaikovsky – Concerto for Violin and Orchestra. Charles Dutoit, Orchestre de la Suisse Romande. PENTATONE PTC 5186504.
- 2016 Violin showpieces by Pablo de Sarasate, Franz Waxman, Camille Saint-Saëns, Jules Massenet, Maurice Ravel, and Ralph Vaughan Williams. Lawrence Foster, Orchestre Philharmonique de Monte-Carlo. PENTATONE PTC 5186536.
- 2017 Benjamin Britten – Violin Concerto, Paul Hindemith – Violin Concerto. Vladimir Jurowski, Radio Symphony Orchestra Berlin. PENTATONE PTC 5186625.
- 2018 Richard Strauss: Violin Concerto, Miniatures. Lawrence Foster, WDR Symphony Orchestra Cologne
- 2020 Antonio Vivaldi – Four Seasons, Astor Piazzolla – Cuatro Estaciones Porteñas. Munich Chamber Orchestra. PENTATONE PTC 5186746.
- 2021 Mozart: Violin Concertos 1 & 2 - Festival Strings Lucerne, Daniel Dodds. PENTATONE PTC 5186952
- 2023 Bach & Pärt - Stuttgarter Kamerorchester, Christoph Koncz. PENTATONE PTC 5187017
