= Ross Pople =

New Zealand-born British conductor

Ross Pople (born 11 May 1945) is a New Zealand-born British conductor. He is the principal conductor of the London Festival Orchestra. He has worked with Yehudi Menuhin, Clifford Curzon, David Oistrakh, Kentner, George Malcolm, Sir Adrian Boult, Rudolf Kempe, Benjamin Britten, Witold Lutosławski, Krzysztof Penderecki, Michael Tippett, Georg Solti, Leonard Bernstein, George Benjamin, John Casken, Edwin Roxburgh, Luciano Berio, John Tavener, Malcolm Arnold, Pierre Boulez as well as many other major orchestras, choirs and soloists.

As an outstanding young cellist from New Zealand, Ross Pople was awarded scholarships to study in England at the Royal Academy of Music, the Paris Conservatoire and the Chigiana Academia, Siena. After graduating and at the age of 23 Yehudi Menuhin appointed Pople to be solo principal cellist of the Bath/Menuhin Festival Orchestra. He was subsequently appointed solo principal cellist of the BBC Symphony Orchestra.

In 1980 Ross Pople took up the helm of London Festival Orchestra and toured Germany. He quickly made LFO a household name through his summer festival titled Cathedral Classics, often directing from the cello. He has taken the LFO on tour throughout Europe, the Americas and the Far East. Also associated with Pople's name is the Southbank series Birthday Honours, the Hochhauser series at the Barbican, the annual Remembrance Sunday Concert at the Royal Albert Hall, the festival Dutch Cornucopia and the Virtuoso Piano series at Cadogan Hall.

Ross Pople is Artistic Director of The Warehouse, a studio space which hosts BBC3's recording of the New Generation Artists series, the British Music Information Centre (BMIC) contemporary series Cutting Edge and the resident Warehouse Ensemble.

Critics often cite Pople's sound knowledge of the orchestra and repertoire which ensures effortless communication between composer, orchestra and audience. Pople has produced a large number of definitive performances and recordings and is acknowledged as an expert interpreter of contemporary music

Pople has recorded some 80 discs for the Deutsche Grammophon, Hyperion, ASV and Sony BMG Arte Nova labels. These include the complete Mendelssohn String Symphonies, Holst The Planets, Richard Strauss Metamorphosen, Sinfonie Concertanti (by J.S. Bach, Haydn, Stamitz and Mozart), symphonies of Schubert and Mendelssohn, Haydn's complete London Symphonies, Arnold, Stravinsky, Vaughan Williams, César Franck, Boccherini, Schoenberg and more.

== Discography ==
Arnold – Sinfoniettas 1 – 3, Oboe Concerto Op. 39
Bach, J.S. – Brandenburg Concertos No.'s 1, 2 & 3
Bach, J.S. – Brandenburg Concertos No's 4, 5 & 6
Bach, J.S. – Musical Offering
Bach, J.S. – Suite No. 1 in C major BWV 1066, Suite No. 2 in B minor BWV 1067
Bach, J.S. – Suite No. 3 in D, BWV 1068, Suite No. 4 in D, BWV 1069
Bach, J.C. – Symphonies Op. 3, No's 1 – 6
Bach, J.C. – 4 Sinfonies Concertantes
Boccherini – Symphonies 6 in D minor, 8 in A
Boccherini – Six Symphonies Op. 35
Boccherini – Four Symphonies Op. 37, No's 1, 3 & 4
Boyce – Symphonies
Britten – Variations on a theme of Frank Bridge, Simple Symphony
Christmas Collection – 'Festliche Suite' in A major, Shepherd's Music for Christmas and more
Copland – Appalachian Spring, Sextet for Clarinet, Piano & String Quartet
Corelli – Concerti Grossi Op. 6, No.'s 1 – 6
Corelli – Concerti Grossi Op. 6, No.'s 7 – 12
Cornucopia – Two CD selection from the first 21 years Warehouse Records
Dvořák – Serenade for Strings Op.22, Serenade for Wind Op. 44
Elgar – Introduction and Allegro, Serenade for Strings
Fauré – Highlights from 'Cathedral Classics'
Franck – Symphonic Variations for Piano and Orchestra, Cello Sonata
Grieg – Holberg Suite, Two Elegiac Melodies
Handel – Oboe Concerto's No.'s 1, 2 & 3, Flute Concerto
Handel – Water Music, Concerto Grosso Op.3, No. 3
Handel – The Messiah
Haydn – London Symphonies No.'s 1 – 12
Haydn & Stamitz – Sinfonia Concertante in B flat, Op.84 Hob1:105, Symphonie Concertante in C, for two violins
Holst – The Planets, A Fugal Overture
Holst – St. Paul's Suite, Brook Green Suite
Janáček – Suite for Strings – Mładi, Idyll
Mendelssohn – The Complete String Symphonies
Mendelssohn – Symphonies 1 & 4, Hebrides Overture
Mendelssohn – Octet, Quintet
Mozart – The 2 Sinfonie Concertanti
Mozart – Sinfonie Concertante
Orff – Carmina Burana
Roxburgh – 'How pleasant to know Mr Lear', 'Dreamtime' for Flute & Orchestra
Saint-Saëns – Carnival of the Animals, 'Wedding Cake' polka for Piano & Strings
Schoenberg/Strauss – Verklarte Nacht, Metamorphosen
Schubert – Symphonies 1 & 2
Schubert – Symphonies 3 & 4
Stravinsky – Pulcinella Suite, Appollon Musagete
Stravinsky – The Soldiers Tale (complete)
Vaughan Williams – Fantasia on a theme of Thomas Tallis, The Lark Ascending
Warlock – Capriol Suite, Serenade for strings
Wassenaer – Six Concerti Armonici
