= Sam Haywood =

British pianist, based in London (born 1972)

- Born: 16 April 1972 (age 54); Brisbane, Australia
- Genre: Classical
- Instrument: Piano
- Label: Hyperion

Sam Haywood (born 16 April 1972) is a British pianist, based in London.

== Early life and education ==
Haywood was born in Brisbane, Australia to British parents. He grew up in the English Lake District and began playing the piano at the age of four. He studied with David Hartigan from Chetham's School of Music and at the age of 13 won second prize in the piano final of BBC Young Musician of the Year. In 1989 he was awarded the Julius Isserlis Scholarship by the Royal Philharmonic Society and moved to Vienna to study with Paul Badura-Skoda. He continued his studies with Maria Curcio at the Royal Academy of Music, after which he moved to Berlin.

== Career ==
His first CD for Hyperion was the piano works of Julius Isserlis, grandfather of Steven Isserlis, with whom Haywood has often collaborated. He also is a regular duo partner to the American violinist Joshua Bell, with whom he has toured extensively in the USA and Europe. In celebration of Chopin's 200th anniversary, he recorded a CD of Chopin's piano music on the composer's own Pleyel instrument, part of the Cobbe Collection. In 2013 he made his US solo debut at the Kennedy Center in Washington DC as well as co-founding the Solent Music Festival in Lymington, Hampshire, with his wife Sophia Pagoni. He has written a children's opera, and Song of the Penguins for bassoon and piano.

== Selected discography ==
Julius Isserlis Piano Music for Hyperion
Composers in Love
Joshua Bell Musical Gifts for Sony Masterworks
