= Julien Libeer =

Belgian classical music composer

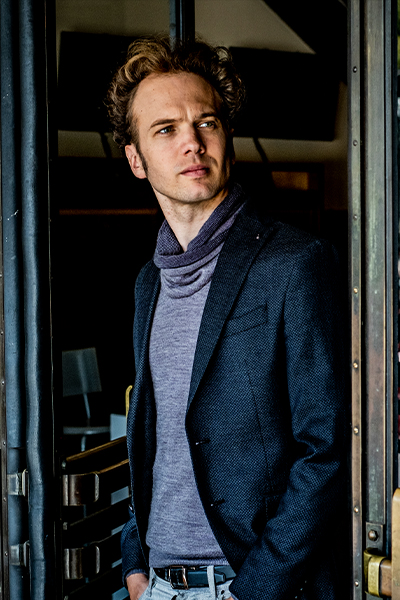
- Julien Libeer portrait (2022)
- Born: October 1987 (age 38); Kortrijk, Belgium
- Occupation: Classical pianist
- Website: julienlibeer.net

Julien Libeer (born October 1987 in Kortrijk) is a Belgian classical pianist. Libeer has won several awards for his compositions, and regularly performs his works at a variety of international stadiums. He is the host of Belgian television show Studio Flagey Klassik, a television show about classical music.

== Biography ==
=== Education and studies ===
As a child, Libeer developed a keen interest for classical music, ranging from opera, orchestra, and chamber music. At four years old, he aspired to become a conductor after watching Leonard Bernstein conducting West Side Story. He decided to become a pianist only after discovering Romanian pianist and composer, Dinu Lipatti.

Between 2005 and 2009, Libeer studied at the Royal Conservatory of Brussels (along with Daniel Blumenthal). At 18 years of age, he honed his skills working with French-Polish pedagogue, Jean Fassina, in Paris. Libeer had an intense collaboration with Portuguese pianist Maria João Pires at the Queen Elisabeth Music Chapel, whose advice and support strongly influenced Libeer's views over the last few years. He regularly shared the stage with the pianist over the same years.

Libeer is an associate artist of the Queen Elisabeth Music Chapel, where he also specialized in chamber music with the members of the Artemis Quartet. He collaborated and received advice from Dmitri Bashkirov, Alfred Brendel, Nelson Delle-Vigne Fabbri, Jura Margulis and Gerhard Schulz (Alban Berg Quartett).

After staying away from international competition, Libeer received the Juventus Award for most promising young European soloist in 2008, and was elected Young Musician of the Year by the Belgian Music Press Association in 2010. The Klara award was attributed to him twice, in 2013 and 2016.

=== Career ===
Libeer is a resident artist at Flagey (Brussels, Belgium) since 2020.

He has performed as a soloist, concertist and chamber musician at the Barbican Hall (London), Auditorio Nacional de Música (Madrid), Palau de la Música Catalana (Barcelona), Elbphilharmonie (Hamburg), and is a regular guest of the Centre for Fine Arts, Brussels and Concertgebouw, Amsterdam. In addition, other tours have taken him to Japan (Tokyo, Sumida Triphony Hall), Lebanon (Beirut Chants festival), Turkey (Ankara International Music Festival) and the United States (Miami International Piano Festival).

He has performed with numerous orchestras: Deutsche Kammerphilharmonie Bremen, Brussels Philharmonic, Belgian National Orchestra, Hong Kong Sinfonietta, Antwerp Symphony Orchestra, Sinfonia Varsovia and New Japan Philharmonic; working along conductors such as Trevor Pinnock, Michel Tabachnik, Augustin Dumay, Hervé Niquet, Joshua Weilerstein, Enrique Mazzola, and Christopher Warren-Green. His dedication to the works of Dinu Lipatti has resulted in collaborations with the Bucharest Radio Orchestra, among others, and to two recordings produced by the Belgium record label Evil Penguin Classic.

He works on a regular basis with the Danish String Quartet, Camille Thomas, with whom he recorded the album Réminiscences (La Dolce Volta), Paul Lewis, Maria João Pires and Lorenzo Gatto, with whom he also performed and recorded the complete Beethoven violin and piano sonatas over several seasons (at venues including Wigmore Hall, Louvre, and the Concertgebouw Amsterdam).

Libeer is a regular guest of Belgian and international media.

He is the producer, host and mediator of Studio Flagey Klassiek on Canvas, a major Belgian television show on classical music (2016). He hosted "Salon Libeer", a concert series at the Bruges Concertgebouw, in which he joins with fellow musicians and speakers to discuss the musical experiences of the audience (2017–2021). Since February 2022, Libeer has been hosting the lecture series "Dead or Alive" in collaboration with LUCA School of Arts and the Catholic University of Leuven, a philosophical exploration of the shifts in classical music making where leading figures are invited to debate (philosophers, writers, musicians...). In 2013, Libeer starred in a documentary film Technique doesn't exist, along with Maria João Pires and Donald Sturrock. In 2018, Musiq'3/RTBF honored him in another 50-minute documentary Jeunes solistes, grands destins: Julien Libeer (Young soloist, great destiny: Julien Libeer).

Artistic director of the Singing Molenbeek project, Libeer supervises high level choir rehearsals in the primary schools of the Brussels municipality. The project has gathered the help of various artists since its creation in 2014 by Zeno Popescu.

== Discography ==
Libeer's recordings were critically acclaimed worldwide. Alongside albums with cellist Camille Thomas (Réminiscences, La Dolce Volta) and violinist Lorenzo Gatto (complete Beethoven violin and piano sonatas, Alpha Classics), Libeer recorded Bach – Bartók in 2020 and J.S. Bach & beyond – A Well-Tempered Conversation in 2022 for Harmonia Mundi. He takes a conceptual approach to Bach's legendary Well-Tempered Clavier mirrored with the work of classical and contemporary composers in major mode. This last project was performed live at concerts with various arrangements: piano solo, piano and choir...

=== Solos ===
- J.S. Bach & beyond – A Well-Tempered Conversation – A dialogue in which Johann Sebastian Bach's Well-Tempered Clavier, Book 1 'converse' with later pieces (in the corresponding minor keys) by the following composers: Ludwig van Beethoven, Johannes Brahms, Ferruccio Busoni, Frédéric Chopin, Gabriel Fauré, György Ligeti, Wolfgang Amadeus Mozart*, Sergei Rachmaninoff, Maurice Ravel, Max Reger, Arnold Schoenberg, Dmitri Shostakovich. Julien Libeer, piano; * Guest: Adam Laloum, piano (2CD, 2022, Harmonia Mundi) – Press awards: ffff Télérama, Classical album of the year 2022 De Standaard, Heute Klassiek Empfehlung 10/10 (in Germany), Joker from Crescendo Magazine (in Belgium).
- Bach-Bartók – Piano Suites – Johann Sebastian Bach: French Suite No. 5 in G Major, BWV 816; Partita for keyboard No. 2, BWV 826 – Béla Bartók: Suite for Piano, Op. 14; Out of Doors, Sz. 81. Julien Libeer, piano. (1CD, 2020, Harmonia Mundi) – Press awards: **** BBC Music Magazine; 5 de Diapason.
- Lignes Claires – Maurice Ravel: Valses nobles et sentimentales, M. 61; Le Tombeau de Couperin, M. 68 – Dinu Lipatti: Nocturne for piano; Piano Sonatina for the left hand. Julien Libeer, piano. (1CD, 2016, Evil Penguin Classic) – Press award: 5 de Diapason.

=== Duets ===
- Ludwig van Beethoven: Violin Sonatas No. 3 in E Flat-Major, Op. 12 No. 3; No. 7 in C Minor, Op. 30 No. 2; No. 6 in A Major, Op. 30 No. 1; No. 8 in G Major, Op. 30 No. 3. Lorenzo Gatto, violin and Julien Libeer, piano. (1CD, 2019, Alpha Classics). Press award: CHOC from Classica.
- Ludwig van Beethoven : Violin Sonatas No. 1 in D Major, Op. 12, No. 1; No. 10 in G Major, Op. 96; No. 5 in F Major, Op. 24 "Spring". Lorenzo Gatto, violin and Julien Libeer, piano. (1CD, 2018, Alpha Classics).
- Ludwig van Beethoven : Violin Sonatas No. 9 in A Major, Op. 47 "Kreutzer"; No. 4 in A Minor, Op. 23; No. 2 in A Major, Op. 12, No. 2. Lorenzo Gatto, violin and Julien Libeer, piano. (1CD, 2016, Alpha Classics) – Press awards: Diapason d'Or of the year 2016, CHOC of the year 2016 from Classica.
- Réminiscences – Gabriel Fauré: Élégie, op. 24; Trois mélodies, Op. 7 (Fauré); 3 Songs, Op. 23 (I. Les Berceaux); Sicilienne, Op. 78 – Camille Saint-Saëns: Le Carnaval des animaux (The Carnival of the Animals), R. 125 – XIII. Le cygne (The Swan); Suite for Cello and Piano, Op. 16 (II. Sérénade) – César Franck: Sonata for Cello and Piano in A Major, FWV 8 – Eugène Ysaÿe: Sonata for solo cello, in C minor, Op.28 – Henri Duparc: L'invitation au voyage. Camille Thomas, cello and Julien Libeer, piano. (1CD, 2016, La Dolce Volta) – Press awards: CHOC from Classica, ECHO Klassik-Preis (Germany).

=== Orchestral productions ===
- Lignes Parallèlles – Joseph Haydn: Symphony No. 49 in F Minor, Hob. I:49 "La passione" (The Passion) – Dinu Lipatti: Concertino in Classical Style in G Major, Op. 3, for piano and Chamber orchestra – Wolfgang Amadeus Mozart: Piano Concerto No. 27 in B-Flat Major, K. 595. Julien Libeer, piano; Les Métamorphoses, orchestra; Raphaël Feye, conductor. (1CD, 2018, Evil Penguin Classic) – Press award: 5 de Diapason.

=== Collaborations ===
- César Franck: Complete Chamber music – Various musicians : Leon Blekh, Augustin Dumay, Anna Agafia, Lorenzo Gatto, Shuichi Okada, Miguel da Silva, Ari Evan, Gary Hoffman, Stéphanie Huang, Frank Braley, Alexandre Chenorkian, Jonathan Fournel, Salih Can Gevrek, Julien Libeer, Jean-Claude Vanden Eynden, Philippe Cormann, Quartetto Adorno, Trio Ernest, Karski Quartet. (4CD, 2022, Fuga Libera | Queen Elisabeth Music Chapel | Palazzetto Bru Zane) – Press awards: Diapason d'Or of the year 2022, ffff Télérama.
