= Calefax =

Dutch reed quintet

Calefax is a Dutch reed quintet. The ensemble consists of five different reed instruments played by the musicians Oliver Boekhoorn (oboe), Ivar Berix (clarinet), Raaf Hekkema (saxophone), Jelte Althuis (bass clarinet) and Alban Wesly (bassoon).

== Music ==
The group is described as a "classical ensemble with a pop mentality". They often perform standing up, regularly playing music from memory without sheet music. Calefax has commissioned over two hundred pieces for reed quintet, which it performs alongside arrangements of preexisting works. Their repertoire spans the entire history of music, including Renaissance music, Baroque music, Impressionism in music and Jazz.

== Activities ==
Calefax gives dozens of concerts each season, travelling throughout the world. The group has worked alongside such acts as the Orlando Consort, Mad Cows Sing, pianist Ivo Janssen, alto Helena Rasker, mezzo-soprano Cora Burggraaf, jazz singers Denise Jannah and Astrid Seriese, the Tony Overwater Trio and choreographer Sanne van der Put. Calefax also gives masterclasses and workshops for amateur musicians and conservatoire students.

== CD recordings ==
In 2025, Calefax celebrates its 40th anniversary. Organisms marks the ensemble’s fifth release on PENTATONE, following the critically acclaimed albums An American Rhapsody (2023), Bach’s Musical Offerings (2020), Dido & Aeneazz (2019), and Hidden Gems (2018), the latter earning a 5-star review from BBC Music Magazine. Celebrated for their “witty, well-crafted arrangements” (De Volkskrant) and “beautiful playing” (Het Parool), Calefax has been hailed by The Times as “five extremely gifted Dutch gents who almost make the reed quintet seem the best musical format on the planet.”

== Awards and honours ==
Calefax received the Philip Morris Art Prize in 1997, the Kersjes van de Groenekan Prize in 2001 and the VSCD Classical Music Prize in 2005.
