= Denis Kozhukhin =

Russian pianist (born 1986)

Denis Viktorovich Kozhukhin (Russian: Денис Викторович Кожухин; born in Gorky, 2 July 1986) is a Russian pianist who was awarded third prize in the 2006 Leeds International Piano Competition. He was also awarded first prize in the 2010 Belgian Queen Elisabeth Competition for piano.

He is a laureate of international competitions at the VII International Festival in Otranto (Italy) and the Svyatoslav Richter Memorial Festival in Paris.

== Discography ==
- Prokofiev, Piano Sonata No. 6, No. 7 and No. 8. Onyx ONYX4111 (2013), debut album.
- Joseph Haydn. Piano sonatas, Onyx ONYX4118 (2014)
- Tchaikovsky & Grieg Piano concertos. Rundfunk-Sinfonieorchester Berlin/Vassily Sinaisky. PENTATONE PTC 5186566 (2016)
- Brahms – Ballades & Fantasies. PENTATONE PTC 5186568 (2017)
- Maurice Ravel and George Gershwin – Piano Concertos. Kazuki Yamada, Orchestre de la Suisse Romande. PENTATONE PTC 5186620 (2018).
- Richard Strauss – Burleske/Ein Heldenleben. Marc Albrecht, Denis Kozhukhin, Netherlands Philharmonic Orchestra. PENTATONE PTC 5186617 (2018).
- Grieg & Mendelssohn – Piano Works. PENTATONE PTC 5186734 (2019)
- Franck – Symphony in D Minor & Symphonic Variations. Gustavo Gimeno, Denis Kozhukhin, Orchestre Philarmonique Luxembourg. PENTATONE PTC 5186771 (2020)
