= Johannes Moser (cellist) =

German-Canadian cellist

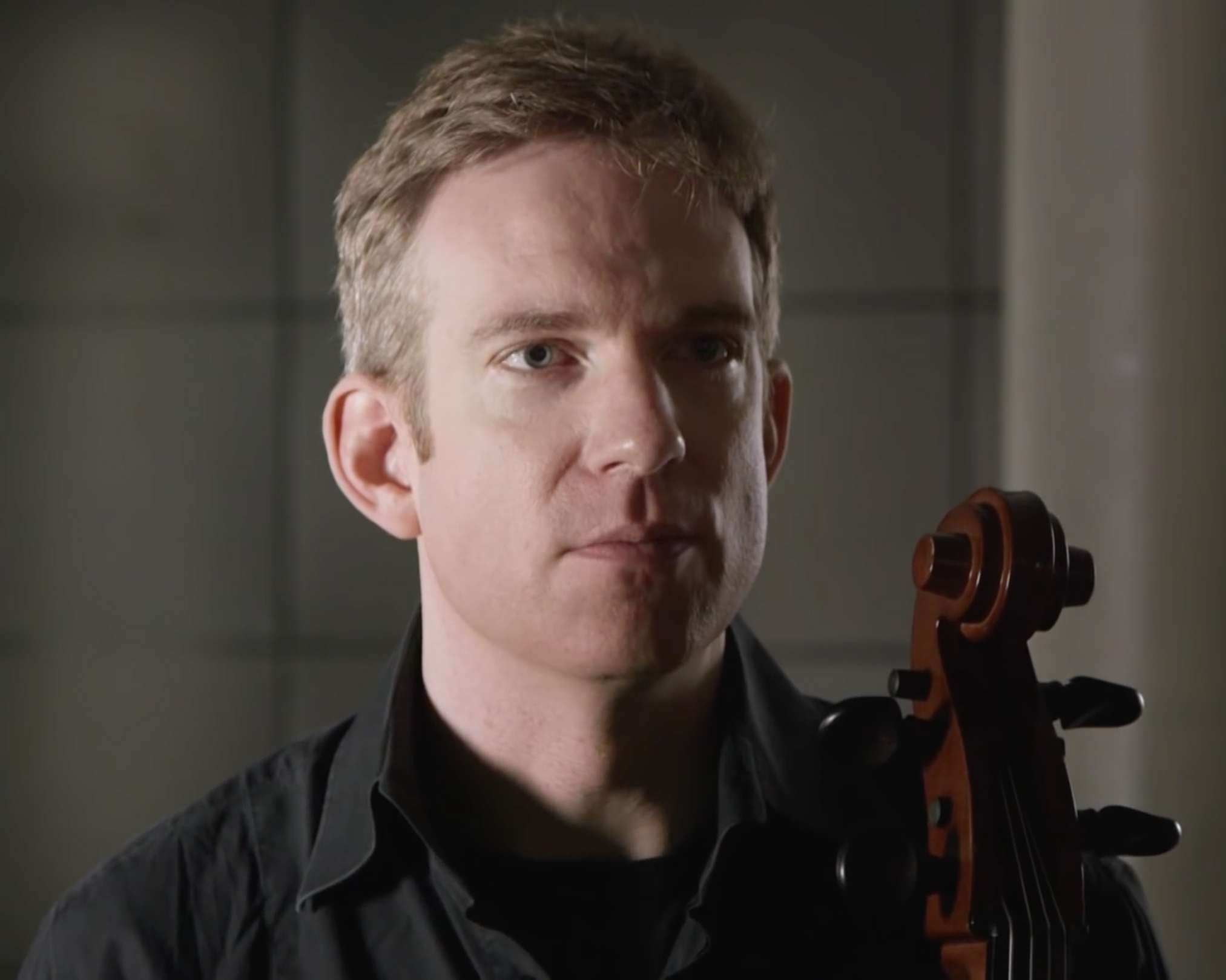
- Moser in 2015
- Born: 14 June 1979 (age 47); Munich
- Occupation: Cellist

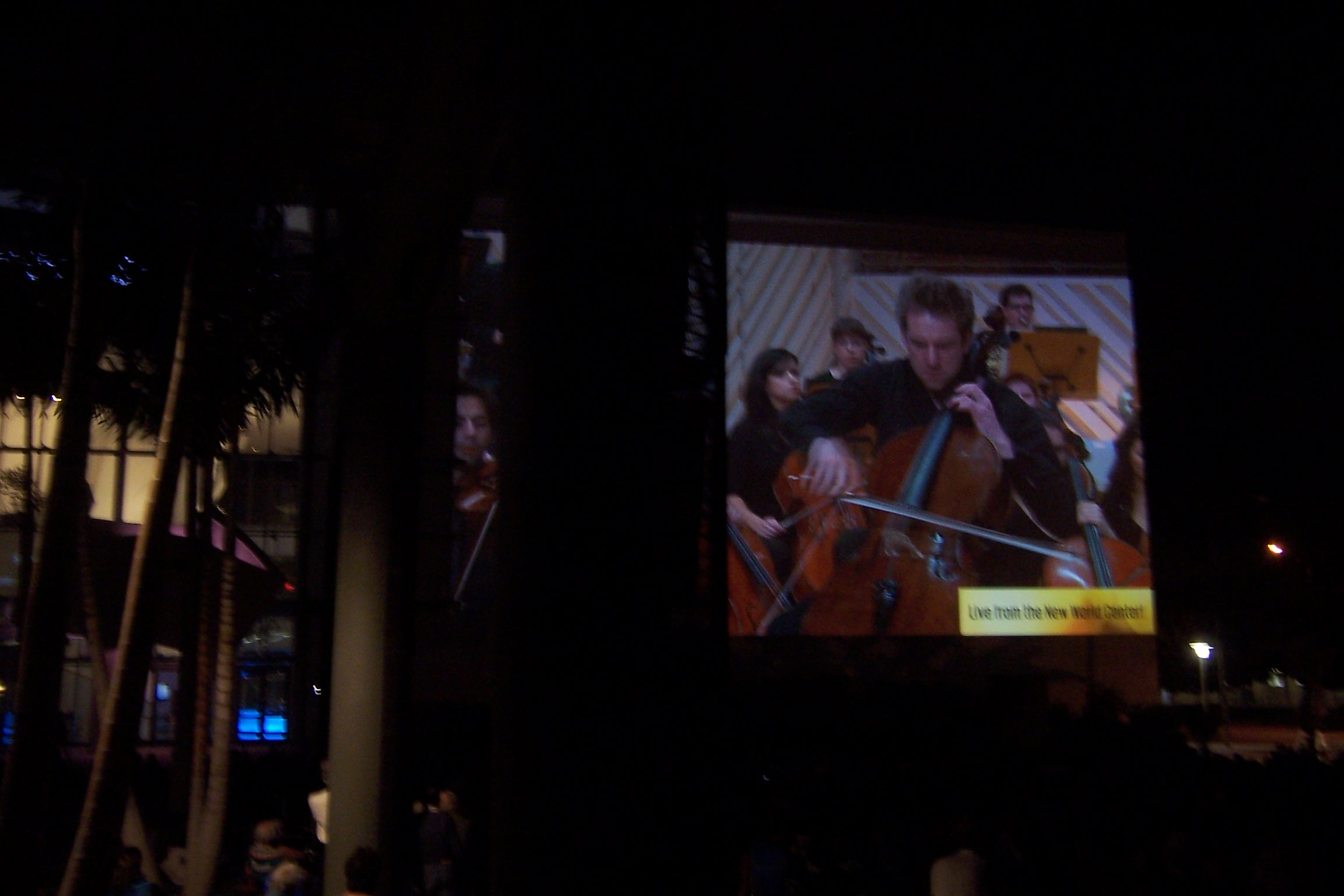
Moser playing the Dvorak Cello Concerto at the New World Center in 2011

Johannes Moser (born 14 June 1979 in Munich) is a German-Canadian cellist who has played with leading orchestras internationally.

== Life and career ==
Born in Munich, Moser studied the cello from age eight, and became a student of David Geringas in 1997. He has performed with leading orchestras including the Berlin Philharmonic, New York Philharmonic, Los Angeles Philharmonic, Hong Kong Philharmonic, Munich Philharmonic and Israel Philharmonic Orchestras as well as the Chicago Symphony, London Symphony, Bavarian Radio Symphony, Frankfurt Radio Symphony, Royal Concertgebouw Orchestra, Tokyo Symphony, Philadelphia and Cleveland Orchestras.

A dedicated chamber musician, Moser has played with Joshua Bell, Emanuel Ax, Leonidas Kavakos, Menahem Pressler, James Ehnes, Midori, and Jonathan Biss. He has also performed at many festivals including the Verbier, Schleswig-Holstein Musik Festival, Gstaad and Kissingen festivals, the Mehta Chamber Music Festival and the Colorado, Seattle and Brevard music festivals.

In March 2015, Moser signed with PENTATONE as an exclusive recording artist. Johannes Moser is also the owner of a YouTube channel on which he posts various videos of him practicing or giving short masterclasses. He has 12.7k subscribers.

== Awards ==
- ECHO Klassik 2017 award for Instrumentalist of the Year
- Preis der Deutschen Schallplattenkritik 2011 for cello concertos by Bohuslav Martinu, Paul Hindemith, Arthur Honegger on Hänssler Classics.
- ECHO Klassik 2008 award for Instrumentalist of the Year
- ECHO Klassik 2007 award for Young Artist
- International Tchaikovsky Competition 2002 – Second Prize; Special Prize for his interpretation of the Rococo Variations

== Discography ==
- Martinů Cello Sonatas - Johannes Moser, Andrei Korobeinikov. PENTATONE PTC: 5187007 (2022) OCLC 1368174731
- Fernando Velázquez: Viento – Johannes Moser, Basque National Orchestra. Pentatone PTC: 5186977 (2022) OCLC 1331440405
- Felix & Fanny Mendelssohn – Works for Cello and Piano. Johannes Moser, Alasdair Beatson. PENTATONE PTC 5186781 (2019) OCLC 1178768493
- Lutoslawski & Dutilleux Cello Concertos. Johannes Moser, Thomas Søndergård, Rundfunk-Sinfonieorchester Berlin PENTATONE PTC 5186689 (2018) OCLC 1081176635
- Elgar & Tchaikovsky. Johannes Moser, Andrew Manze, Orchestre de la Suisse Romande. PENTATONE PTC 5186570 (2017) OCLC 1051668417
- Rachmaninov & Prokofiev – Works for Cello and Piano. Johannes Moser, Andrei Korobeinikov. PENTATONE PTC 5186594 (2016) OCLC 1021853499
- Antonín Dvořák, Édouard Lalo – Cello Concertos. Johannes Moser, Jakub Hrůša, Prague Philharmonia. PENTATONE PTC 5186488 (2015) OCLC 927351105
