= Kazuki Yamada =

Japanese conductor (born 1979)

Kazuki Yamada (山田 和樹; born 26 January 1979) is a Japanese conductor.

== Biography ==
Yamada was born in Hadano, Kanagawa Prefecture. He studied music, with a focus on percussion, at the Tokyo University of the Arts, where his conducting teachers included Ken-Ichiro Kobayashi and Yoko Matsuo. Whilst at the university, he and fellow students founded an orchestra, the TOMATO Philharmonic Orchestra, with Yamada as its music director. The orchestra renamed itself the Yokohama Sinfonietta in 2005, and incorporated professionally in 2011. Yamada was the first prize winner in the 51st Besançon International Conducting Competition in 2009. Other honours include the Akeo Watanabe Music Foundation Music Award and the Hideo Saito Memorial Fund Award, both dating from 2012. He has held the post of 'permanent conductor' of the Japan Philharmonic. In September 2017, the Yomiuri Nippon Symphony Orchestra announced the appointment of Yamada as its next principal guest conductor, effective April 2018, with an initial contract of three years.

In Europe, Yamada first guest-conducted the Orchestre de la Suisse Romande (OSR) in 2010. He became the OSR's principal guest conductor in 2012, with an initial contract of 3 years, after attempts to secure him as the orchestra's next principal conductor did not come to fruition. In June 2014, his contract as principal guest conductor of the OSR was extended through 31 August 2017. Yamada has conducted several commercial recordings with the OSR for the Pentatone label.

External videos
- You may see Kazuki Yamada conducting the Monte-Carlo Philharmonic Orchestra in 2020 with Nelson Freire in Ludwig van Beethoven's: Piano Concerto No. 4 in G major, Op. 58; Symphony No. 8 in F Major, Op. 93; Here on archive.org

Yamada first guest-conducted the Monte-Carlo Philharmonic Orchestra (OPMC) in 2011. In the fall of 2013, he became the orchestra's principal guest conductor. In April 2015, the OPMC announced the appointment of Yamada as its next principal conductor and artistic director, effective September 2016, with an initial contract of three years. In September 2020, the OPMC announced a further contract extension for Yamada through the 2023–2024 season. In June 2023, the OPMC announced the most recent extension of Yamada's contract as its music director, through August 2026. Yamada concluded his OPMC tenure as its music director in August 2026.

Yamada first guest-conducted the City of Birmingham Symphony Orchestra (CBSO) in 2012. In May 2018, the CBSO announced the appointment of Yamada as its next principal guest conductor, effective with the 2018–2019 season. In January 2021, the CBSO announced the extension of Yamada's contract as principal guest conductor with CBSO until 2023. In September 2021, the CBSO announced the appointment of Yamada as its next chief conductor and artistic advisor, effective 1 April 2023, with an initial contract of 4.5 years. In May 2024, the CBSO elevated Yamada's title to music director. In January 2025, the CBSO announced an extension of Yamada's contract as its music director through the 2028–2029 season.

Yamada first guest-conducted the Deutsches Symphonie-Orchester Berlin (DSO-Berlin) in April 2024. He returned for a second guest-conducting appearance with the DSO-Berlin in September 2024. In April 2025, the DSO-Berlin announced the appointment of Yamada as its next chief conductor, effective with the 2026–2027 season, with an initial contract of three years.

Yamada, his wife, and their family reside in Berlin.

== Selected discography ==
- Georges Bizet – L'Arlésienne Suites; Gabriel Fauré – Masques et Bergamasques; Charles Gounod – Faust Ballet Music. Orchestre de la Suisse Romande. Pentatone PTC 5186358 (2013)
- Richard Strauss, Franz Liszt, Erich Wolfgang Korngold, Ferruccio Busoni, Franz Schreker – Orchestral works. Orchestre de la Suisse Romande. Pentatone PTC 5186518 (2014)
- Russian Dances. Pyotr Ilyich Tchaikovsky – Suite from Swan Lake; Alexander Glazunov – 2 Concert Waltzes; Dmitri Shostakovich – The Golden Age; Igor Stravinsky – Circus Polka. Orchestre de la Suisse Romande. Pentatone PTC 5186557 (2016)
- Albert Roussel – Bacchus & Ariane; Claude Debussy – Six Épigraphes Antiques; Francis Poulenc – Les Biches. Orchestre de la Suisse Romande. Pentatone PTC 5186558 (2016)
- Manuel de Falla – Noches en los Jardines de España / El sombrero de tres picos. Mari Kodama, Sophie Harmsen, Orchestre de la Suisse Romande. Pentatone PTC 5186598 (2017)
- Maurice Ravel and George Gershwin – Piano Concertos. Denis Kozhukhin, Orchestre de la Suisse Romande. PENTATONE PTC 5186620 (2018).

Cultural offices
Preceded by Robin Ticciati	Principal Conductor, Deutsches Symphonie-Orchester Berlin; 2026–present	Succeeded by incumbent
