= Lukas Hasler =

Concert organist and composer

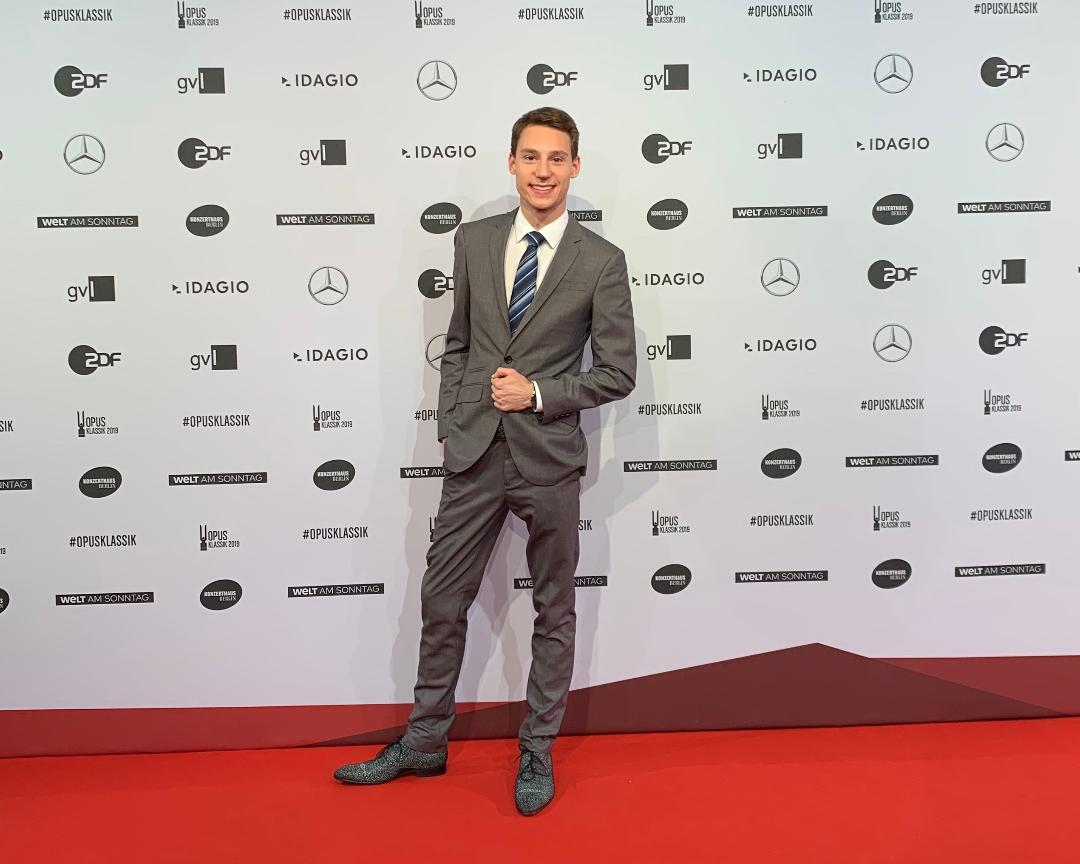
Lukas Hasler at the Opus Klassik award in Berlin (2019)

Lukas Hasler (born March 15, 1996, in Rottenmann.), is an Austrian concert organist, composer, and choir director.

Hasler currently lives in Los Angeles and Vienna.

== Education ==
Lukas Hasler grew up in Upper Styria, Austria. He began studying the piano and organ at an early age and was actively involved in church music. He attended the Benedictine Abbey Grammar School in Admont and, at the age of 16, was admitted to the preparatory organ program at the University of Music and Performing Arts Graz. After completing his secondary education, he continued his organ studies there, graduating with a Master of Arts in 2022.

In addition, Hasler studied Cultural and Media Management at the University of Hamburg, where he earned a master's degree in 2019. He also spent time living in New York and Strasbourg, where he studied organ and improvisation at the Académie Supérieure de Musique de Strasbourg.

== Career ==
Hasler performs 30 to 40 concerts a year and also directs the "PaltenKlang-Choir" in his home town. He has over 100,000 followers on social media and his own YouTube channel.

In 2019, Hasler won the "Grand Prix" at the International Organ Competition in Malta. In the summer of 2019, Hasler released his first solo CD "A Portrait" which features his own improvisations and organ works by Johann Sebastian Bach, Franz Liszt and Marcel Dupré. A notable milestone in Lukas Hasler’s artistic career was his recording on the large organ in the Golden Hall of the Vienna Musikverein. His solo album "Gold" (2026, Pentatone) presents organ arrangements of works by Johann Sebastian Bach, Wolfgang Amadeus Mozart, Ludwig van Beethoven, and Anton Bruckner. The album was met with positive critical reception and broad recognition among audiences.

== Performances ==
Lukas Hasler is in international demand. His concert career has taken him to some of the world's most prestigious venues, including the Berlin Philharmonie, the Golden Hall of the Vienna Musikverein, the Vienna Konzerthaus, and Brisbane City Hall in Australia. He has also performed on some of the most distinguished organs, such as the Bruckner Organ at St. Florian Abbey in Austria and the world's largest cathedral organ in Passau, Germany.

In the United States, Hasler has appeared in major cathedrals from coast to coast, as well as in renowned venues including the Methuen Memorial Music Hall near Boston and the Walt Disney Concert Hall in Los Angeles. Other career highlights include performing at the opening celebrations of the Salzburg Festival and appearing regularly at conventions of the American Guild of Organists.

In addition to his concert career, Hasler is a frequent guest lecturer and gives international masterclasses, including at the Conservatory of Madrid and in Almaty, Kazakhstan.

In 2022, he was the first classical musician to perform in Ukraine after the start of the war and played two benefit concerts in the Lviv Concert Hall for the victims of the war.

== Press ==
The Grunion Los Angeles: "Lukas Hasler showed dazzling finger work in Max Reger's Toccata and Fugue in D minor, which begins quietly and calmly and builds to a majestic climax. The church's magnificent Aeolian-Skinner organ, in Hasler's gifted hands (and feet), rewarded the audience with a kaleidoscope of beautiful, stirring, inspiring and often magical sounds. There was a nice contrast between the pieces, long and short, celebratory and meditative. Hasler negotiated the thick textures while always keeping the melody prominent, no easy feat."

== Awards ==
- 2012: Federal victory „Prima la Musica“ in Fohnsdorf
- 2013: Winner of the Styrian Culture Prize
- 2014: Federal victory „Prima la Musica“ in Wien
- 2014: Winner of the „Bärenreiter“-Prize
- 2015: Finalist of the composing competition „Jugend komponiert“
- 2019: Winner of the „Grand Prix“ at The Malta International Organ Festival
- 2020: Elected "Newcomer of the Year" from the daily newspaper Kleine Zeitung
- 2026: "Rising Star" by ClassicFM

== Discography ==
- CD participation "Thesaurus Eius" – Les Choeurs de Saint-Georges Lyon (2017)
- First Solo-CD "A Portrait" (2019)
- Release of the single "From Austria with Love" (2020)
- Release of the single "Fantasy and Fugue on the Theme B-A-C-H" (2021)
- Release of the single "Trio super - Allein Gott in der Höh sei Ehr" (2024)
- Gold (PENTATONE, 2026)

== Publication ==
- Chancen, Risiken und Ziele des Online-Fundraising am Beispiel von AIMS: Amerikanische Musiker auf der Reise nach Europa. AV Akademikerverlag, ISBN 978-620-2-20644-0.
