= Booth Stradivarius =

1716 violin named for its former owner

The Otto Booth; Cho-Ming Sin Stradivarius of 1716 is an antique violin fabricated by Italian luthier Antonio Stradivari (1644–1737) of Cremona. The original label of the instrument was "Antonius Stradivarius Cremonensis faciebat Anno 1716". The Booth Stradivarius has a two-piece back and has a body length of 35.4 cm.

The Booth receives its name after a former owner, Madame Wilhelm von Booth who purchased the instrument in 1855 for her son Otto van Booth to be played in a Stradivari quartet. Otto van Booth sold the instrument in 1889 to George Hart, an instrument dealer in London, and the instrument has since been used in concerts. In 1930, Booth was sold at an auction by the American Art Association, New York to Rudolph Wurlitzer Company and played by the renowned Ukrainian-born violinist Mischa Mischakoff from 1931 to 1961. After 1961, the instrument became a part of the Henry Hottinger Collection in New York. Cho-Ming Sin from whom the instrument received one of its sobriquets owned the instrument until 1978.

For a time, the instrument was owned and played by violinist Iona Brown, who after a 1998 Tokyo performance of The Lark Ascending, returned the instrument to its case declaring: "It was received so rapturously by the audience that I went back to my dressing room, put my violin in its case and said: 'I'm not going to do it anymore.' I felt it was best to go out on a high note." (The Lark Ascending ends on one of the highest notes on the violin). She never played the violin again, citing her arthritis and age. She sold the instrument in 1999.

Since 1999, The Booth is owned by the Nippon Music Foundation and loaned to distinguished violinists.

After Iona Brown, the German violinist Julia Fischer played the instrument from 2000 to the summer of 2004, until she purchased a 1742-made (1750-reworked) Guadagnini. After Julia Fischer, the Japanese violinist Shunske Sato played the instrument.

The Booth was later loaned to the German violinist Arabella Steinbacher.

== See also ==
- Booth Stradivarius in the Cozio Archive at tarisio.com
