= Julius Isserlis =

Russian pianist and composer

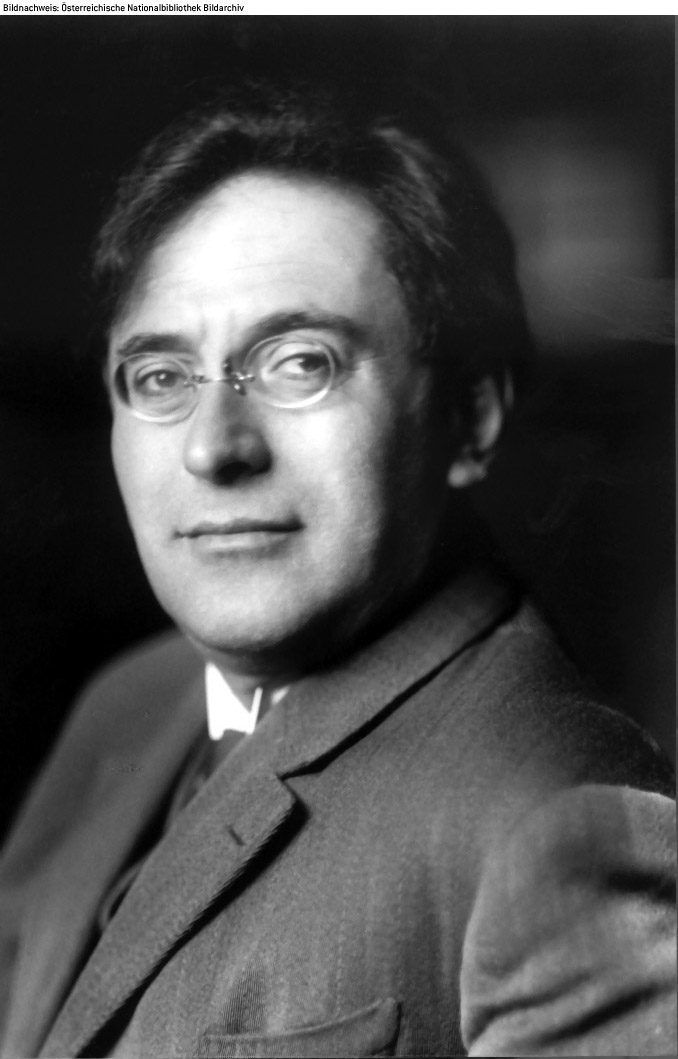
Julius Isserlis c. 1920

Julius Isserlis (26 October (OS) / 7 November 1888 – 23 July 1968) was a pianist and composer.

He was born in Kishinev, Russian Empire (now Chișinău, Republic of Moldova), to a Jewish family. His father was cantor in a synagogue, and also worked as an itinerant dentist; his mother was a midwife. He started playing the piano at the age of four, and showed such precocity that he was entered into the Kiev Conservatory when he was nine; but his professor there, Włodzimierz Puchalski, soon sent him to Moscow to study with Vasily Safonov at the Moscow Conservatory. Here he also studied composition, under Sergei Taneyev. He graduated at the age of sixteen, winning the gold medal of the Conservatory.

In 1907 Isserlis travelled to Paris to take lessons from Charles-Marie Widor. He made a brief trip to the United States, playing a concert in the Carnegie Hall, New York (having been recommended as a soloist by Alexander Scriabin). Returning to the Russian Empire, he was appointed as a professor at the College of the Imperial Philharmonic Society.

In 1916 he met, and soon afterwards married, Rita Rauchwerger, a pianist from a wealthy family in Odessa. Their son George was born in 1917, the year of the Russian Revolution. In 1919 they attempted, unsuccessfully, to escape from Odessa on a British ship. Submitting to the new Communist regime, Isserlis was put work playing the piano for workers in factories and other institutions, often in harsh conditions. In 1922 Isserlis was one of twelve musicians chosen by Lenin, who would be permitted to travel abroad as musical ambassadors for the newly-formed Soviet Union; none of the twelve returned to Russia.

Isserlis arrived in Vienna in 1923 with his wife and son, never to return to the Soviet Union again. Vienna had a very active musical scene, and he was able to build a career there as pianist, composer and teacher. He was in touch with other Russian émigrés; Nathan Milstein and Josef Lhévinne are among those known to have visited him during this time.

At the Anschluss in 1938, Isserlis, fortuitously, was on tour in Britain. He was granted British residency, and was soon joined there by his wife and son. Other Russian émigrés in London included Nicolai Medtner and Benno Moiseiwitsch, with both of whom Isserlis was on friendly terms. Now in his fifties, he worked hard to rebuild his career as a pianist once more; he frequently featured on the BBC Third Programme, and he toured the country with the Wessex Philharmonic. In 1963 he developed Parkinson's disease, and he died in 1968 in London, at the age of 79. He is buried in Bushey Jewish Cemetery.

Isserlis recorded very little; his one commercial recording, of Scriabin's 24 Preludes, Op. 11, was made after the effects of Parkinson's disease had started to affect his pianism. However, some recordings made in Poland before the War survive, as do several BBC tapes.

His compositional output is small, and consists mainly of short piano pieces. One exception is the Ballade in A minor for cello and piano; this was dedicated to Pablo Casals, who corresponded with the composer suggesting various changes. Isserlis's most important influence was Chopin, and he was also inspired by Rachmaninoff, Ravel and Debussy. A recording of his music, played by pianist Sam Haywood (joined by cellist Steven Isserlis, the composer's grandson, for the Ballade in A minor), has been issued by Hyperion Records.

Isserlis's three grandchildren, Annette, Rachel and Steven, are all professional musicians. He is commemorated in Britain by the biennial award of the Julius Isserlis Scholarship by the Royal Philharmonic Society; the Scholarship was first awarded in 1980 following a bequest of Cecilia Helen Northcote.
