= Jonathan Gilad =

French pianist (born 1981)

Jonathan Gilad (born 17 February 1981) is a French classical pianist.

== Biography ==
Born in Marseille, Gilad started playing the piano at the age of 5.

After his scientific classe préparatoire aux grandes écoles studies at the lycée Thiers in Marseille, Gilad did well at the entry examinations: he received major in the École nationale supérieure des mines de Paris competition, 2nd in the École centrale Paris competition, 3rd in his department at the École polytechnique and 6th in the École normale supérieure. He finally chose to join the École Polytechnique.

Gilad also entered the Conservatoire de Marseille, Pierre Pradier's class, and won a gold medal at the age of 11. In 1991, he won the First Grand Prix of the City of Marseille. As a child prodigy, he won a few awards: in November 1991, the special prize of the jury of the Mozart competition organized by the city of Paris; in April 1992, the first prize of the international competition "Premio Mozart" for children under 14 years old, in Geneva. The same year he was awarded the Summer Academy Prize in Salzburg. He continued his training with Dmitri Bashkirov in Madrid and Salzbourg.

In October 1996 in Chicago, Gilad replaced the unwell Maurizio Pollini, thus making his North American debut.

In April 1998, at the age of 17, he played Robert Schumann's Piano Concerto at the Berlin festival with Chicago Symphony Orchestra conducted by Daniel Barenboim. Later, he was the soloist for the American tour of Saint Petersburg Philharmonic Orchestra conducted by Yuri Temirkanov, and then gave a concert at the Carnegie Hall of New York.

In November 1998, his first recording was released on CD by EMI Classics as part of their "Début" series; it included sonatas by Mozart, Beethoven and Variations and Fugue on a Theme by Handel by Brahms. This record earned him a nomination for the 1999 Victoires de la musique prize.

His festival appearances occurred in Ravinia, Aspen, Klavier-Festival Ruhr, Lucerne, and Verbier, as well as in (Carnegie Hall in New York, Herkulessaal in Munich, Wigmore Hall in London, the Berliner Philharmonie, and the Royal Concertgebouw in Amsterdam. He performed with such orchestras as Chicago Symphony Orchestra, Boston Symphony Orchestra, Baltimore Symphony Orchestras, Orchestre de Paris, Orchestre national de France, Israel Philharmonic Orchestra, Saint Petersburg Philharmonic Orchestra, Russian National Orchestra, Camerata Salzburg, Orchestra del Maggio Musicale Fiorentino, Orchestre de la Suisse Romande, Orchestre de Chambre de Lausanne, Orchestre philharmonique de Marseille conducted by Ricardo Casero Garrigues, Daniel Barenboim, Neville Marriner, Zubin Mehta, Eiji Ōue, Seiji Ozawa, Vladimir Spivakov, Yuri Temirkanov, Sandor Végh, Alain Lombard and also Tugan Sokhiev.

Gilad also participates regularly in concert performances of chamber music, with partners such as Julia Fischer, Mihaela Martin, Nikolaj Znaider, Viviane Hagner, Frans Helmerson, Daniel Müller-Schott, Renaud and Gautier Capuçon.

== Selected discography ==
- Mozart's Piano Sonata No. 17
- Beethoven's Piano Sonata No. 28
- Brahms's 25 variations and fugue on a Handel theme (EMI)
- Beethoven's 3 sonatas for piano (Lyrinx)
- Prokofiev's Sonata for piano No 1 and No 2, Suggestion diabolique
- Rachmaninov's Variations sur un thème de Corelli Op. 42, Préludes No 5 and No 12
- Mozart's Piano Sonata No. 10 K330, No 12 K332, No 14 K457 and Fantasia in C minor, K. 475 (Lyrinx)
- Mendelssohn's Trios, with Julia Fischer and Daniel Müller-Schott (Pentatone)
- Mendelssohn's Works for cello and piano - Daniel Müller-Schott (Orféo)
