= De Munck (Stradivarius cello) =

Antique cello

The De Munck Stradivarius of 1730, also called the De Munck–Feuermann, is an antique cello crafted by Italian luthier Antonio Stradivari. It was notably owned and played by Ernest de Munck and Emanuel Feuermann. Steven Isserlis has described the instrument as his "dream cello [...] it has everything."

It is currently owned by the Nippon Music Foundation, who has loaned the instrument to a number of prominent cellists.

== Background ==
The De Munck–Feuermann, while labelled 1710, was made during Stradivari's "late period". It owes its nicknames to two notable owners and players of the instrument, cellists Ernest de Munck (acquired in 1869) and Emanuel Feuermann (acquired in 1934), the latter being considered one of the greatest cellists of the 20th century. After Feuermann's death in 1942, the instrument was acquired by American collector Russell B. Kingman, and then sold to cellist Aldo Parisot in 1956.

The instrument was sold by Parisot to the Nippon Music Foundation in December 1996. It was on loan to Steven Isserlis until May 2011, then to Danjulo Ishizaka. On 24 September 2019, it was loaned to Camille Thomas for a period of one year.

== Measurements ==
The De Munck–Feuermann is characterised by its long narrow shape. Its detailed dimensions, as measured by calliper, are:

Part	Measurement
Back length	74.5 centimetres (29.3 in)
Upper bouts	32.35 centimetres (12.74 in)
Lower bouts	41.6 centimetres (16.4 in)
Middle bouts	21.3 centimetres (8.4 in)
Depth of ribs	11.6 centimetres (4.6 in)
