= Inon Barnatan =

American-Israeli musician

- ינון ברנתן
- Born: 1979 (age 46–47); Tel Aviv, Israel
- Occupation: Classical pianist
- Awards: The Avery Fisher Career; Grant (2009); Andrew Wolf Memorial Award

Inon Barnatan (Hebrew: ינון ברנתן; born 1979 in Tel Aviv, Israel) is an American/Israeli classical pianist.

== Biography ==
Inon Barnatan lives in New York City.

== Music career ==
He studied with Victor Derevianko, Maria Curcio and Christopher Elton at The Royal Academy of Music. Barnatan often performs works by contemporary composers such as George Crumb, George Benjamin, Kaija Saariaho, and Judith Weir. He regularly performs with cellist Alisa Weilerstein.

In 2014 Barnatan became the first Artist in Association at the New York Philharmonic. The New York Times listed his album Darknesse Visible as one of the best classical recordings of 2012.

Barnatan has received many awards, including an Avery Fisher Career Grant in 2009 and the Andrew Wolf Memorial Award.

In 2019, Barnatan debuted with the record label PENTATONE.

== Recordings ==
- Rachmaninoff Reflections (2023), PENTATONE
- Beethoven Cello Sonatas (2022) - with Alisa Weilerstein on Pentatone
- Beethoven - Piano Concertos Part 2 (2020) with Alan Gilbert, Lydia Teuscher, Toby Spence, Amy Lyddon, Rosie Aldridge, Ben Bevan, Neal Davies, Academy of St Martin in the Fields, London Voices (PENTATONE)
- Beethoven - Piano Concertos Part 1 (2019) with Stefan Jackiw, Alisa Weilerstein, Alan Gilbert, Academy of St Martin in the Fields (PENTATONE)
- Schubert Late Sonatas (2013)
- Darknesse Visible (2012)
- Works for Piano and Violin (2010) with Liza Ferschtman
- Inon Barnatan Plays Schubert (2010)
