= Steven Isserlis =

British cellist (born 1958)

Steven Isserlis CBE
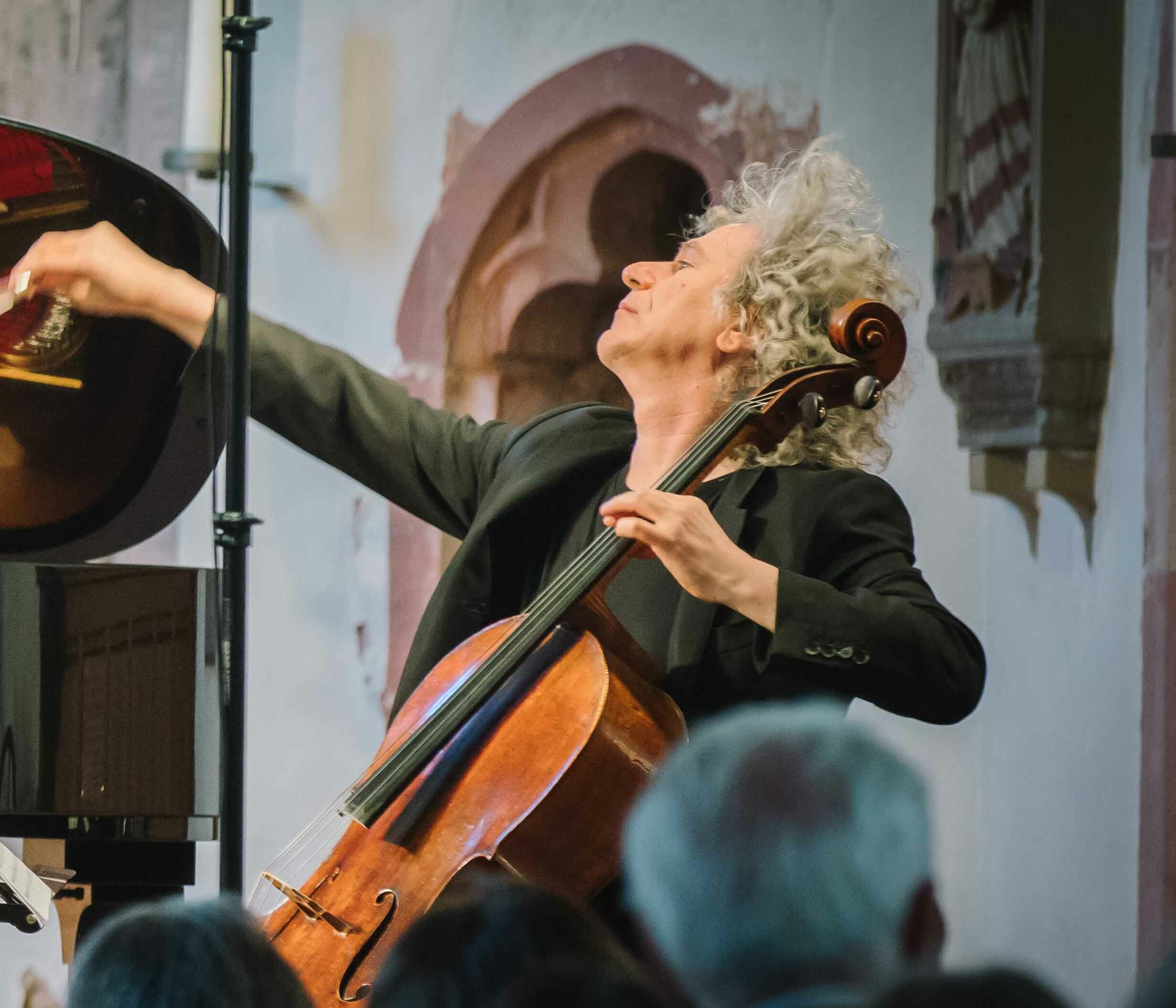
- Isserlis in 2018

Background information
- Born: 19 December 1958 (age 67); London, England
- Genres: Classical
- Occupations: Musician; author
- Instrument: Cello
- Years active: 1977–present
- Labels: Hyperion; RCA Red Seal; BIS; Virgin Classics
- Website: stevenisserlis.com

Steven John Isserlis CBE (born 19 December 1958) is a British cellist. An acclaimed soloist, chamber musician, educator, writer and broadcaster, he is widely regarded as one of the leading musicians of his generation. He is also noted for his diverse repertoire and distinctive sound which is partly from his use of gut strings.

Isserlis has been the recipient of numerous awards including the Royal Philharmonic Society Music Award in 1993, the Robert Schumann Prize of the City of Zwickau in 2000, and both the Wigmore Hall Medal and Glashütte Original Music Festival Award in 2017. His recordings have garnered two Gramophone Awards, a Classical BRIT Award, a BBC Music Magazine Award, and two Grammy Award nominations among others. He is also one of the only two living cellists inducted into the Gramophone Hall of Fame.

Isserlis currently plays on the 1726 Marquis de Corberon cello made by Antonio Stradivari on loan from the Royal Academy of Music.

== Early life and education ==
Isserlis was born into a musical family in London. His mother was a piano teacher, and his father a keen amateur musician. His sister Annette is a viola player, and his sister Rachel is a violinist. Isserlis has described how "playing music, playing together", was an integral part of his early family life. His grandfather, Julius Isserlis, was one of 12 musicians allowed to leave Russia in the 1920s to promote Russian culture, but he never returned.

On the Midweek programme in January 2014, Isserlis dislcosed that on arrival in Vienna in 1922, his pianist grandfather and father found a flat, but the 102-year-old landlady refused to take in a musician, because her aunt had a previous musician tenant who was noisy and would spit on the floor—this tenant was Ludwig van Beethoven.

Isserlis went to the City of London School, which he left at the age of 14 to move to Scotland to study under the tutelage of Jane Cowan. From 1976 to 1978 Isserlis studied at the Oberlin Conservatory of Music with Richard Kapuscinski. Ever since his youth Daniil Shafran has been his cello hero, and Isserlis has described how "his vibrato, his phrasing, his rhythm all belonged to a unique whole... he was incapable of playing one note insincerely; his music spoke from the soul."

The name Isserlis is one of many European variants of the Hebrew name 'Israel'.

== Career ==
Isserlis's major career breakthrough came in 1988, when he asked John Tavener to write a work for cello and orchestra. The result of this was The Protecting Veil which Isserlis premiered at the BBC Proms with the BBC Symphony Orchestra and Oliver Knussen. The piece and also Isserlis’ subsequent recording of it were met with both critical and public acclaim. The recording became a classical bestseller.

Since then, Isserlis has had an active solo career and regularly appears with many of the world's leading ensembles. He has performed with the Berlin Philharmonic, Vienna Philharmonic, Gewandhausorchester Leipzig, Tonhalle-Orchester Zürich, Deutsches Symphonie-Orchester Berlin, London Symphony Orchestra, London Philharmonic Orchestra, Philharmonia Orchestra, Boston Symphony Orchestra, Chicago Symphony Orchestra, Cleveland Orchestra, Los Angeles Philharmonic, New York Philharmonic, Philadelphia Orchestra, and the NHK Symphony Orchestra. He has also curated concert series for Wigmore Hall, 92nd Street Y in New York and the Salzburg Festival.

Isserlis is an advocate of historical performance practices and frequently performs with period instrument orchestras. He has performed Beethoven with fortepianist Robert Levin in Boston and London, and Dvořák’s Cello Concerto with the Orchestra of the Age of Enlightenment with Sir Simon Rattle. He has also published several editions and arrangements, principally for Faber Music and was an advisor on new editions of Beethoven's cello works, as well as the concertos of Dvořák and Elgar.

In contemporary music, Isserlis has premiered works by composers John Tavener, Lowell Liebermann, Carl Vine, David Matthews, John Woolrich, Wolfgang Rihm, Mikhail Pletnev and Thomas Adès. He also commissioned a new completion of Prokofiev’s Cello Concertino from the Udmurt musicologist Vladimir Blok, which was premiered in 1997 with the BBC National Orchestra of Wales conducted by Mark Wigglesworth.

Isserlis has presented a number of festivals with long-term collaborators such as Joshua Bell, Stephen Hough, Mikhail Pletnev, András Schiff, Dénes Várjon, Olli Mustonen, Tabea Zimmermann, and actors Barry Humphries and Simon Callow. He is artistic director of the International Musicians Seminar, Prussia Cove in West Cornwall, where he both performs and teaches.

== Instruments ==
Isserlis currently plays on the 1726 Marquis de Corberon cello made by Antonio Stradivari on loan from the Royal Academy of Music, previously owned by Zara Nelsova and Hugo Becker.

He is also a part-owner of a Domenico Montagnana cello from 1740 and a Giovanni Battista Guadagnini cello from 1745, which he played exclusively from 1979 to 1998. He has also performed on the De Munck-Feuermann Stradivarius owned by the Nippon Music Foundation.

== Writings ==
Isserlis is the author of two books for children on the lives of famous composers: the first is Why Beethoven Threw the Stew (Faber, 2001), and the second is Why Handel Waggled His Wig (Faber, 2006). He has also written three stories that have been set to music by Oscar-winning composer Anne Dudley. The first of the series Little Red Violin (and the Big, Bad Cello) received its first performance in New York in March 2007, followed by Goldipegs and the Three Cellos, and Cindercella.

In September 2016, Isserlis's book for young musicians, Robert Schumann's Advice to Young Musicians Revisited by Steven Isserlis, was published by Faber & Faber.

In October 2021, Faber & Faber published Isserlis's book The Bach Cello Suites: A Companion, a volume entirely devoted to the history and music of Bach's suites for unaccompanied cello.

== Awards ==
- 1992: Gramophone Awards – Contemporary Album of the Year
- 1993: Royal Philharmonic Society Music Award
- 1993: Piatigorsky Prize
- 1998: Appointed Commander of the Order of the British Empire (CBE)
- 2000: Robert Schumann Prize of the City of Zwickau
- 2005: APRA Music Award for Best Performance of an Australian Composition
- 2007: Gramophone Awards – Instrumental Album of the Year
- 2008: Classical BRIT Awards – Critics’ Award
- 2013: Gramophone Hall of Fame inductee. One of the only two living cellists included.
- 2015: Grammy Award nomination for Best Chamber Music/Small Ensemble Performance
- 2016: Walter Willson Cobbett Medal
- 2017: Glashütte Original Music Festival Award at the Dresden Music Festival
- 2017: The Wigmore Hall Medal
- 2018: Grammy Award nomination for Best Classical Instrumental Solo
- 2019: Limelight Magazine Awards – Chamber Music Recording of the Year
- 2021: BBC Music Magazine Awards – Premiere Award

== Personal life ==
Isserlis’ wife Pauline Mara, a flautist, died of cancer in June 2010. They have a son, Gabriel, born in 1990.

Isserlis lives in London.

== Discography ==
Isserlis's recordings reflect the breadth and eclecticism of his repertoire. His most recent release of reVisions for BIS includes arrangements and reconstruction of works by Debussy, Ravel, Prokofiev and Bloch. For Hyperion Records, Isserlis has recorded Schumann's music for cello and piano (Dénes Várjon), and the complete solo cello suites by Bach, which has won many awards, including Listeners' Disc of the Year on BBC Radio 3's CD Review, Gramophone's Instrumental Disc of the Year, and "Critic's Choice" at the 2008 Classical Brits. Other releases include two recordings with Stephen Hough: the Brahms sonatas, coupled with works by Dvořák and Suk; a highly acclaimed disc of children's cello music for BIS Records; and a recording with Thomas Ades of his new piece 'Lieux retrouvés'. Recent releases included a disc in 2013 of Dvořák's Cello Concerto with Daniel Harding and the Mahler Chamber Orchestra on Hyperion and Martinu's complete cello sonatas with Olli Mustonen on the BIS label in 2014 which received a Grammy nomination.

In 2017, Isserlis's recording of Haydn's Cello Concertos was nominated for a Grammy Award.

== Bibliography ==
- Isserlis, Steven (2001). Why Beethoven Threw the Stew (And Lots More Stories about the Lives of Great Composers). London: Faber and Faber. ISBN 0-571-20616-6. OCLC 51389891.
- —— (2006). Why Handel Waggled His Wig (And Lots More Stories about the Lives of Great Composers). London: Faber and Faber. ISBN 0-571-22478-4. OCLC 77516216.
- —— (2017). Robert Schumann's Advice to Young Musicians: Revisited by Steven Isserlis. University of Chicago Press. ISBN 978-0-226-48274-3. OCLC 975487315.
- —— (2021). The Bach Cello Suites: A Companion. London: Faber and Faber. ISBN 978-0-571-36624-8. OCLC 1233266815.
