= Deutsches Symphonie-Orchester Berlin =

German broadcast orchestra based in Berlin

Deutsches Symphonie-Orchester Berlin (DSO)
- Orchestra
- Official logo
- Founded: 1946; 80 years ago
- Location: Berlin, Germany
- Concert hall: Philharmonie Berlin
- Principal conductor: Kazuki Yamada
- Website: Official website

The Deutsches Symphonie-Orchester Berlin (DSO) is a German broadcast orchestra based in Berlin. The orchestra performs its concerts principally in the Philharmonie Berlin. The orchestra is administratively based at the Rundfunk Berlin-Brandenburg (RBB) Fernsehzentrum in Berlin.

== History ==
The orchestra was founded in 1946 by American occupation forces as the RIAS Symphonie-Orchester (RIAS, Rundfunk im amerikanischen Sektor / "Radio In the American Sector"). It was also known as the American Sector Symphony Orchestra. The orchestra's first principal conductor was Ferenc Fricsay. In 1956 it was renamed the Berlin Radio Symphony Orchestra (Radio-Symphonie-Orchester Berlin), and in 1993 took on its present name.

Between the chief conductorships of Lorin Maazel and Riccardo Chailly, the orchestra did not have a single chief conductor. The major conductors who worked with the orchestra during this period, from 1976 to 1982, were Erich Leinsdorf, Eugen Jochum, Gerd Albrecht, Gennady Rozhdestvensky and Neville Marriner. The orchestra returned to having a single chief conductor in 1982 with Riccardo Chailly. Ingo Metzmacher became principal conductor as of the 2007–2008 season, with an original initial contract until 2011. However, after reports of disputes over financing and a threatened reduction in the size of the orchestra, in March 2009, Metzmacher announced his early resignation from the DSO-Berlin principal conductorship as of the summer of 2010. His final concerts as the orchestra's principal conductor were in June 2010 in Berlin and in August 2010 at The Proms. In September 2010, the DSO-Berlin announced the appointment of Tugan Sokhiev as its principal conductor and artistic director, as of 2012, with a contract of 4 years. Sokhiev concluded his DSO-Berlin tenure after the 2015–2016 season.

In October 2014, Robin Ticciati made his first guest-conducting appearance with the DSO-Berlin. In October 2015, the orchestra named Ticciati its next principal conductor, effective with the 2017–2018 season, with an initial contract of 5 years. In September 2020, the DSO Berlin announced the extension of Ticciati's contract through 2027. In March 2023, a news report indicated that Ticciati is to stand down as principal conductor of the orchestra in 2025, two years ahead of his previously announced contract extension. Ticciati formally concluded his DSO-Berlin tenure in December 2024, having conducted his final concert as its principal conductor in November 2024.

In April 2024, Kazuki Yamada first guest-conducted the DSO-Berlin. He returned for a second guest-conducting appearance as an emergency substitute conductor in September 2024. In April 2025, the orchestra announced the appointment of Yamada as its next chief conductor, effective with the 2026–2027 season, with an initial contract of three years.

The DSO-Berlin has recorded commercially for such labels as Deutsche Grammophon, Sony Classical and Harmonia Mundi. In 2011, the orchestra won a Grammy Award for its recording of Kaija Saariaho's L'amour de loin, conducted by Kent Nagano.

== Principal conductors ==
- Ferenc Fricsay (1948–1954, 1959–1963)
- Lorin Maazel (1964–1975)
- Riccardo Chailly (1982–1989)
- Vladimir Ashkenazy (1989–1999)
- Kent Nagano (2000–2006)
- Ingo Metzmacher (2007–2010)
- Tugan Sokhiev (2012–2016)
- Robin Ticciati (2017–2024)
- Kazuki Yamada (2026–present)

== Conductors laureate ==
- Günter Wand
- Kent Nagano

== See also ==
- Category:Music commissioned by the Deutsches Symphonie-Orchester Berlin (2)
