= Classica (magazine) =

French magazine devoted to classical music

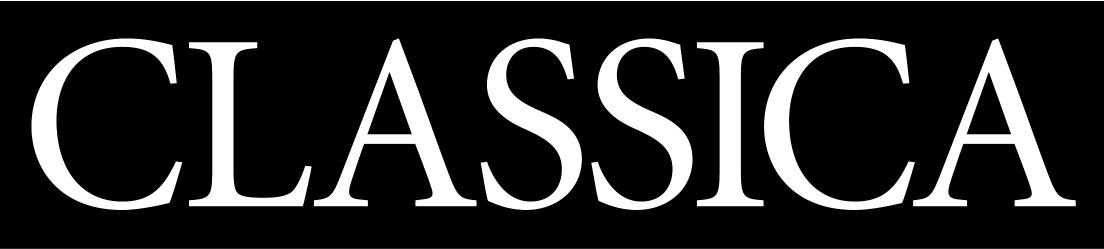
- Editor: Premières Loges
- Categories: Classical music
- Frequency: Monthly
- Total circulation: 26,599 (2013)
- Founder: Stéphane Chabenat
- First issue: 1998; 28 years ago
- Final issue Number: 2025; 1 year ago 270
- Company: Humensis
- Country: France
- Based in: Paris
- Language: French
- Website: classica.fr
- ISSN: 1966-7892

Classica is a monthly French classical music magazine founded in 1998.

The reviews section awards Choc-Classica recommendations to selected recordings while the annual record awards of the magazine are called the Chocs de l'année.

It was owned by the Roularta Media Group until January 2015 when it was acquired by French businessman Patrick Drahi.

In 2013 the circulation of Classica was 26,599 copies.
