= Thüringer Bachwochen =

The Thüringer Bachwochen (Thuringia Bach weeks) is a Baroque music festival in honor of Johann Sebastian Bach. It is the largest classical music festival in Thuringia, Germany. The artistic director since 2004 has been the Erfurt Cathedral organist Silvius von Kessel.

== History ==
In 1992, the Thuringian Bach Festival was held for the first time. After being abandoned, it was revived in 2005. Artists have included Ton Koopman, Olivier Latry, the Cappella Amsterdam, Martin Stadtfeld, Sol Gabetta, the Berlin Baroque Soloists, the Collegium Vocale Gent conducted by Philippe Herreweghe, the Tölzer Knabenchor and the Dresdner Kreuzchor.

== Locations ==
Bach was born in Thuringia and lived in various places in the province. Venues for events vary from year to year. They have included:

- Arnstadt: Bachkirche Arnstadt
- Dornheim: St. Bartholomäi, Dornheim where Bach married his first wife.
- Eisenach: St. Georg, Eisenach, Bach House (Eisenach), Wartburg
- Erfurt: Augustinerkloster, Erfurt Cathedral, Predigerkirche, Theater Erfurt
- Gotha: St. Margarethen, Gotha
- Jena: St. Michael, Jena
- Mühlhausen: Marienkirche
- Ohrdruf: St. Trinitatis, Ohrdruf
- Schmalkalden: St. Georg, Schmalkalden
- Waltershausen: Stadtkirche, Waltershausen
- Wechmar: Bach House
- Weimar: Deutsches Nationaltheater, St. Jakob, Weimar, St. Peter und Paul, Schloss Weimar

== See also ==
- Bach festival
- Early music festival
