= Festival of Flanders =

Festival of Flanders (Dutch: Festival van Vlaanderen) is an annual music event at different locations in Flanders. It started initially as a "Summer Festival", but now its activities are spread from January to May, with a peak in late summer and early autumn.

== History ==
The Festival of Flanders has its roots in Tongeren, Limburg, where Jan Briers organized the Basilica-concerts from 1958 in the basilica of Tongeren. At first there was played religiously inspired choral music, but soon it was extended to other classical music, instrumental music; and other locations. Often, historical sites such as abbeys and castles are used, with an occasional transfer to Maastricht.

As in other Flemish cities (classical) summer concerts were held as well, they joined forces in 1972 and created the more comprehensive 'Festival of Flanders'.

The organization was actively supported by the newly emancipated Flemish "cultural autonomy". Especially in Brussels they wanted to exhibit "serious" Flemish culture. Partly because of this, they could bring prestigious orchestras and big names to Flanders. At the same time it gave the festival a somewhat elitist character.

In the nineties, they began to see the creation of this one-sided image and so the program was expanded to include contemporary music, sound art, youth, jazz, organ music, musical theater, and cross-overs with visual arts, film, dance.

== Spreading ==
The Festival of Flanders consists of various festivals spread across different Flemish cities and provinces:

- Antwerp:
  - Laus Polyphoniae:
- Bruges:
  - MAfestival Brugge
- Brussels:
  - KlaraFestival/The European Galas/Living Room Music/MusMA/Dorp op stap/Festival on Tour http://www.festivalbrxl.be/en
- Ghent:
  - Gent Festival van Vlaanderen
- Kortrijk:
  - Happy New Festival van Vlaanderen
- Limburg:
  - Basilica Festival van Vlaanderen
- Mechelen:
  - Mechelen hoort stemmen/Festival+/Festival Kempen
- Flemish Brabant:
  - NOVECENTO
  - TRANSIT
