= Bachfest Leipzig =

Music festival

Logo

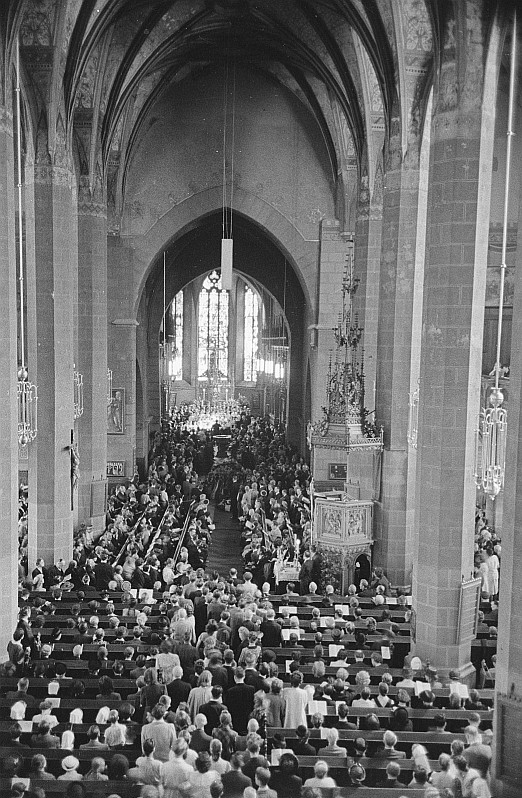
St. Thomas Church, 28 July 1950

The Bachfest Leipzig (Leipzig Bach Festival) is a music festival which takes place annually, in the month of June, in the city of Leipzig, where J. S. Bach worked as the Thomaskantor from 1723 until his death in 1750. The current artistic director is Professor Michael Maul.

The city first hosted a festival in 1904, for the Neue Bachgesellschaft, and then formally, since 1908. The festival was sometimes referred to as the Bachwochen (Bach Weeks) or Bachtage (Bach Days). Since 1999, the festival has been organized by the Bach Archive on behalf of the city of Leipzig, each year under a different theme.

Each year there are approximately 100 individual events during the Bach Festival, beginning with an opening concert conducted by the serving Thomaskantor. The final concert is traditionally a performance of Bach's Mass in B minor in the St. Thomas Church.

== Themes ==
- 2004: "Bach and the romantic era"
- 2005: "Bach and the Future"
- 2006: "From Bach to Mozart"
- 2007: "From Monteverdi to Bach"
- 2008: "Bach and his sons"
- 2009: "Bach – Mendelssohn – Reger"
- 2010: "Bach – Schumann – Brahms"
- 2011: "... nach italienischem Gusto" (... to Italian taste)
- 2012: "»... ein neues Lied« – 800 Jahre Thomana" (... a new song – 800 years of music at St. Thomas)
- 2013: "Vita Christi" (The life of Christ)
- 2014: "Die wahre Art" (The true way)
- 2015: "So herrlich stehst du, liebe Stadt!" (So glorious you stand, dear city!)
- 2016: "Geheimnisse der Harmonie" (Secrets of Harmony)
- 2017: "Ein schön new Lied – Musik und Reformation" (A Beautiful New Song – Music and Reformation)
- 2018: "Zyklen" (Cycles)
- 2019: "»Hof-Compositeur« Bach" (Bach, "Court Composer")
- 2021: Erlösung (redemption)
- 2022: We Are Family
- 2023: For Future
- 2024: CHORal TOTAL
- 2025: Transformation
