= Stamitz =

Stamitz (Czech: Stamic) was the surname of a family of German Bohemian musicians, the principal members of which were:

- Johann Stamitz (1717–1757), Czech-German composer, founder of the Mannheim school
- Carl Stamitz (1745–1801) German composer, son of Johann
- Anton Stamitz (1750–c.1800), son of Johann

== See also ==
- 7623 Stamitz, a main-belt asteroid
