= Sasakawa Music Foundation =

Japanese music promotion organization

Old Logo

The Sasakawa Music Foundation (Japanese: 笹川音楽財団, Hepburn: Sasakawa ongaku zaidan) (SMF) is a Public Interest Incorporated Foundation under the supervision of the Cabinet Office. Established on 3rd March 1972, its stated purpose is to contribute to the promotion and dissemination of musical culture in Japan and abroad. To achieve this purpose, it carries out four activities: preserving and loaning world-class musical instruments, holding concerts, and providing grants.

== Instruments ==
SMF has in its endowment one of the largest collections of antique instruments made by luthier Antonio Stradivari (1644-1737), with an additional two by Giuseppe Guarneri (1698-1744).

Guarneri del Gesù

Violin

- 1736 Muntz
- 1740 Ysaÿe

Stradivarius

Cello

- 1696 Aylesford
- 1730 Feuermann; De Munck; Gardiner
- 1736 Paganini; Ladenburg

Viola

- 1731 Paganini; Mendelssohn

Violin

- 1666 Alumunus Amati; ex-Serdet
- 1680 Paganini; Desaint
- 1700 Dragonetti
- 1702 Lord Newlands
- 1708 Huggins
- 1709 Engleman
- 1710 Camposelice
- 1714 Dolphin; Delfino
- 1715 Joachim
- 1716 Booth
- 1717 Sasserno
- 1722 Jupiter; ex-Goding
- 1725 Wilhelmj
- 1727 Paganini; Conte Cozio di Salabue
- 1735 Samazeuilh
- 1736 Muntz

== See also ==
- List of Stradivarius instruments
