= Pentatone (record label) =

Classical music record label

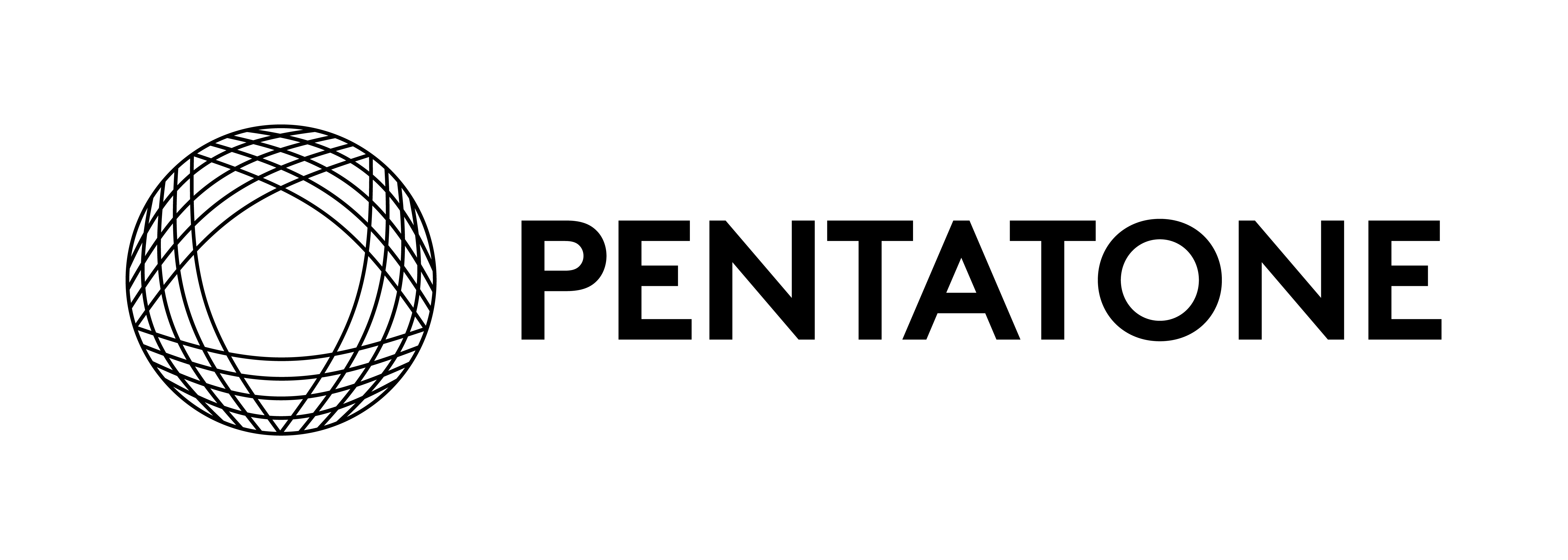
- Founded: 2001
- Founder: Dirk van Dijk, Job Maarse, and Giel Bessels
- Genre: Classical
- Country of origin: Netherlands
- Location: Baarn
- Official website: pentatonemusic.com

Pentatone (stylized as PENTATONE) is an international classical music label located in Baarn, Netherlands.

== History ==
Three former executives of Philips Classics, Giel Bessels, Dirk van Dijk and Job Maarse, established the label in 2001. The name comes from the words penta (five) and tone (sound), meaning five channels of sound. The label is renowned for its high-resolution multichannel surround sound recordings which are released in the Super Audio CD format. In January 2002, Pentatone recorded the official music which was performed during the wedding ceremony of the Dutch crown prince Willem-Alexander and Máxima Zorreguieta. The album, “The Music from the Royal Wedding”, sold more than 75,000 copies, thereby attaining the unique “triple platinum” status.

The label has also licensed recordings made by other labels such as Philips Classics and Deutsche Grammophon. Among these are some from the 1970s which were originally recorded for 4-channel quadraphonic sound. Pentatone has remastered them for re-release and presented them in surround sound for the first time. All Pentatone's hybrid Super Audio CD discs can also be heard in 2-channel stereo on conventional compact disc players.

In 2013, a new management team joined Pentatone and the label expanded to multiple formats releases, including regular cd, vinyl, and all formats for streaming and downloads. The first vinyl was released in 2017 as a luxury 3LP edition. The label decided to honour Julia Fischer's Bach violin solo recordings (originally released by the label in 2005).

In April 2022, Pentatone appointed Sean Hickey as managing director, succeeding Simon M Eder. The following month it was announced that Pentatone had been acquired by the San Francisco Conservatory of Music.

== Awards ==
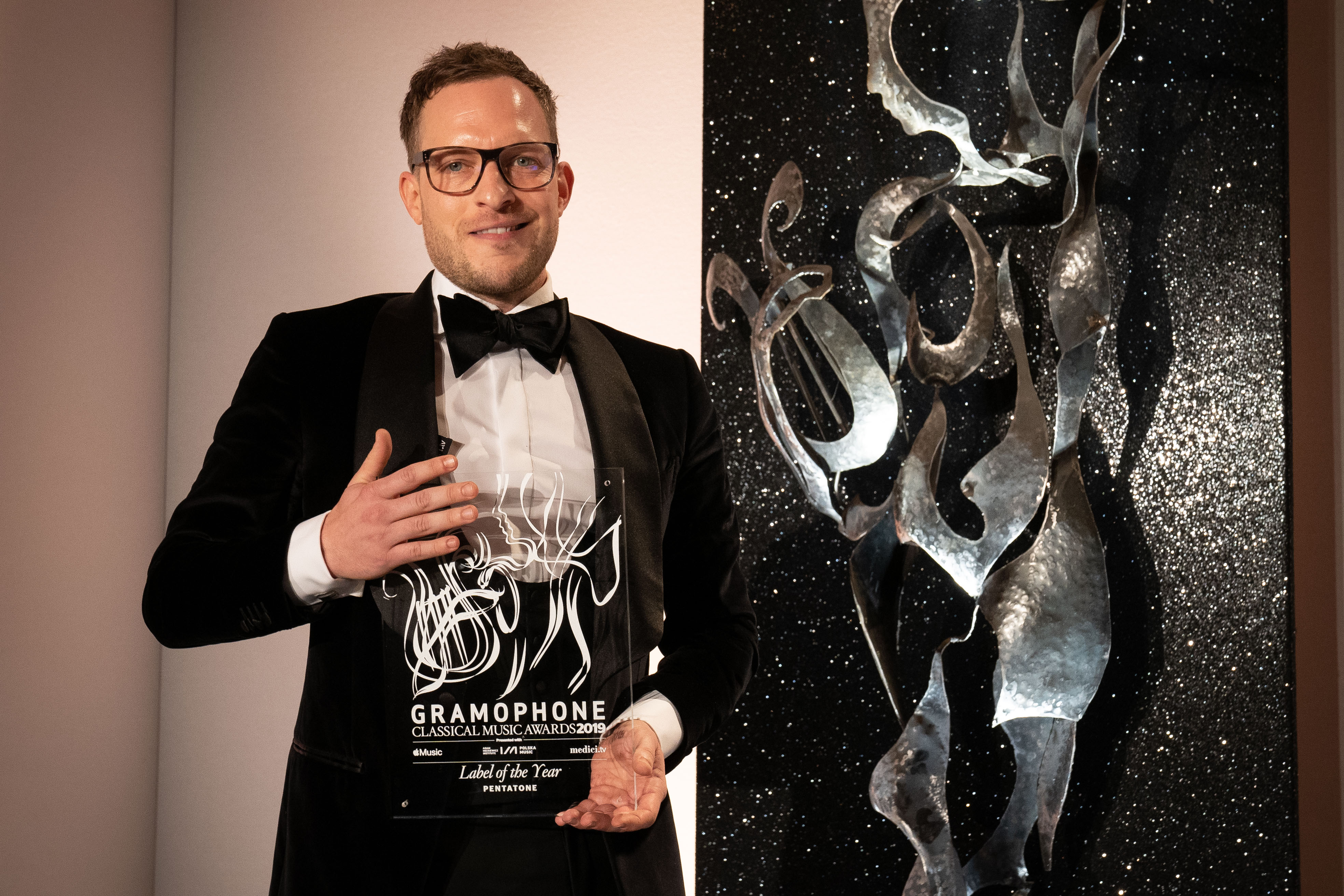
Pentatone's former managing director, Simon Eder, collects the Gramophone's 2019 Label of the Year Award

In 2004, the label received a Grammy Award for their recording of Peter and the Wolf, narrated by Sophia Loren, Bill Clinton and Mikhail Gorbachev, where the story is told from the perspective of the wolf and has the theme of letting animals live in peace. Other award-winning issues have included John Corigliano's The Ghosts of Versailles, part of the American Opera Series, which won multiple awards, including the 59th Grammy Award as Best Opera Recording and Best Engineered Album.

In 2019 Pentatone's premiere recording of the Mason Bates opera “The (R)evolution of Steve Jobs” won the Best Opera Recording at the 61st Grammy Awards. Among the winners were composer Mason Bates, librettist Mark Campbell, the Santa Fe Opera, conductor Michael Christie, and the cast, which included Sasha Cooke, Jessica E. Jones, Edward Parks, Garrett Sorenson, Wei Wu, and Elizabeth Ostrow. The opera was nominated for Best Contemporary Composition but lost to the Kernis Violin Concerto.

In 2019, the label was awarded Label of the Year by the Gramophone Magazine. In 2020, Pentatone won the title of Label of the Year in the International Classical Music Awards. In 2024, four albums received GRAMMY nominations in four different categories.

In April 2024, Pentatone exclusive artist Sean Shibe won the Instrumental Award at the 2024 BBC Music Magazine Awards for his album Profesión. In October 2024, Pentatone's long-term recording partner Czech Philharmonic won Orchestra of the Year at the Gramophone Awards 2024 before being awarded the 'Orchestral Recording of the Year' award at the BBC Music Magazine Awards in 2025.

In 2026, Pentatone received a GRAMMY Award in the category of Best Engineered Album, Classical for Cerrone: Don’t Look Down, performed by Sandbox Percussion. The award recognised the work of engineer Mike Tierney and mastering engineer Alan Silverman. The album was also nominated in the categories Best Classical Compendium and Best Contemporary Classical Composition at the 68th Annual Grammy Awards.

== Artists ==
Piano

- Pierre-Laurent Aimard
- Yulianna Avdeeva
- Inon Barnatan
- Sa Chen
- Lara Downes
- Saskia Giorgini
- Martin Helmchen
- Charlotte Hu
- Mari Kodama
- Denis Kozukhin
- Francesco Piemontesi
- Tiffany Poon
- Tamara Stefanovich
- Christopher O'Riley
- Christian Blackshaw

Organ

- James McVinnie
- Lukas Hasler

Cello

- Matt Haimovitz
- Max Lilja
- Johannes Moser
- Alisa Weilerstein

Violin

- Chloe Chua
- Julia Fischer
- Leticia Moreno
- Philippe Quint
- Arabella Steinbacher
- Midori

Guitar

- Sean Shibe

Clarinet

- Annelien Van Wauwe

Oboe

- François Leleux

Mandolin

- Alon Sariel

Accordion

- Richard Galliano

Soprano

- Eleonora Burratto
- Kiera Duffy
- Rosa Feola
- Christina Landshamer
- Kathryn Lewek
- Hanna-Elisabeth Müller
- Lisette Oropesa
- Sondra Radvanovsky
- Chen Reiss
- Erin Morley

Mezzo-Soprano

- Sasha Cooke
- Alice Coote
- Ann Hallenberg
- Magdalena Kožená
- Elisabeth Kulman
- Rinat Shaham

Countertenor

- Bejun Mehta
- Franco Fagioli
- Tim Mead

Tenor

- René Barbera
- Piotr Beczała
- Ian Bostridge
- Javier Camarena
- Christian Elsner
- Michael Fabiano
- Nathan Granner
- Stefano Secco
- Lawrence Brownlee

Baritone

- Thomas Hampson

Bass-Baritone

- Adam Plachetka
- Kevin Short

Conductors

- Marc Albrecht
- Herbert Blomstedt
- Semyon Bychkov
- Roderick Cox
- Christoph Eschenbach
- Diego Fasolis
- Lawrence Foster
- Riccardo Frizza
- Gustavo Gimeno
- Philippe Herreweghe
- Jakub Hrůša
- René Jacobs
- Marek Janowski
- Vladimir Jurowski
- Yakov Kreizberg
- Andrew Manze
- Neville Marriner
- Simon Murphy
- Kent Nagano
- Jonathan Nott
- Daniel Oren
- Andrés Orozco-Estrada
- Rafael Payare
- Mikhail Pletnev
- Carlo Ponti
- Daniel Reuss
- Esa-Pekka Salonen
- Kazuki Yamada
- William Christie
- Simon Rattle
- Jörg Widmann
- Oksana Lyniv
- Kirill Karabits

Ensembles

- Calder Quartet
- Calefax
- Emerson String Quartet
- Miró Quartet
- Signum Quartet
- Les Arts Florissants
- Trondheim Soloists
- Constantinople
- Scharoun Ensemble

Orchestras

- Akademie für Alte Musik Berlin
- B'Rock Orchestra
- Czech Philharmonic
- Detroit Symphony Orchestra
- Dresdner Philharmonie
- Houston Symphony
- Il Pomo d'Oro
- Frankfurt Radio Symphony
- Gewandhausorchester Leipzig
- Luxembourg Philharmonic Orchestra
- Lyric Opera of Chicago
- Lyric Opera of Kansas City
- NDR Radiophilharmonie
- Netherlands Philharmonic Orchestra
- New Dutch Academy
- Orchestre de la Suisse Romande
- Orchestre symphonique de Montréal
- Oregon Symphony
- Rundfunk-Sinfonieorchester Berlin
- Russian National Orchestra
- San Francisco Symphony
- Washington National Opera
- WDR Symphony Orchestra Cologne
- Bamberg Symphony
- Irish Chamber Orchestra
- Festival Strings Lucerne
- MDR Leipzig Radio Symphony Orchestra
- Kölner Akademie
- Bournemouth Symphony Orchestra

Composers

- Hilarion Alfeyev
- Timo Andres
- Lera Auerbach
- David Balakrishnan
- Marcos Balter
- Lisa Bielawa
- Richard Blackford
- Nadia Boulanger
- Christopher Cerrone
- Annabelle Chvostek
- Francisco Coll
- David Conte
- John Corigliano
- Gordon Getty
- Philip Glass
- Jake Heggie
- Wim Henderickx
- Jennifer Higdon
- David Henry Hwang
- Vijay Iyer
- Gabriel Kahane
- David Lang
- Helmut Lachenmann
- David T. Little
- Sky Macklay
- Tod Machover
- Kamala Sankaram
- Missy Mazzoli
- Brad Mehldau
- Paul Moravec
- Nico Muhly
- Niloufar Nourbakhsh
- Nkeiru Okoye
- Tomeka Reid
- David Sanford
- Gene Scheer
- Caroline Shaw
- Roberto Sierra
- Gabriella Smith
- Lewis Spratlan
- John K. Samson
- Tamar-kali
- Jeanine Tesori
- Fernando Velázquez
- Errollyn Wallen
- Luna Pearl Woolf
- Nia Franklin

== Catalogue series ==
- Orchestre Philharmonique du Luxembourg series
- American Operas Series
- Dances Series
- Remastered Classics: Philips Classics
- Pentatone Oxingale Series
- Remastered Classics: Deutsche Grammophon
- RQR Series
