= Orfeo ed Euridice discography =

Discography for Gluck's opera Orfeo ed Euridice

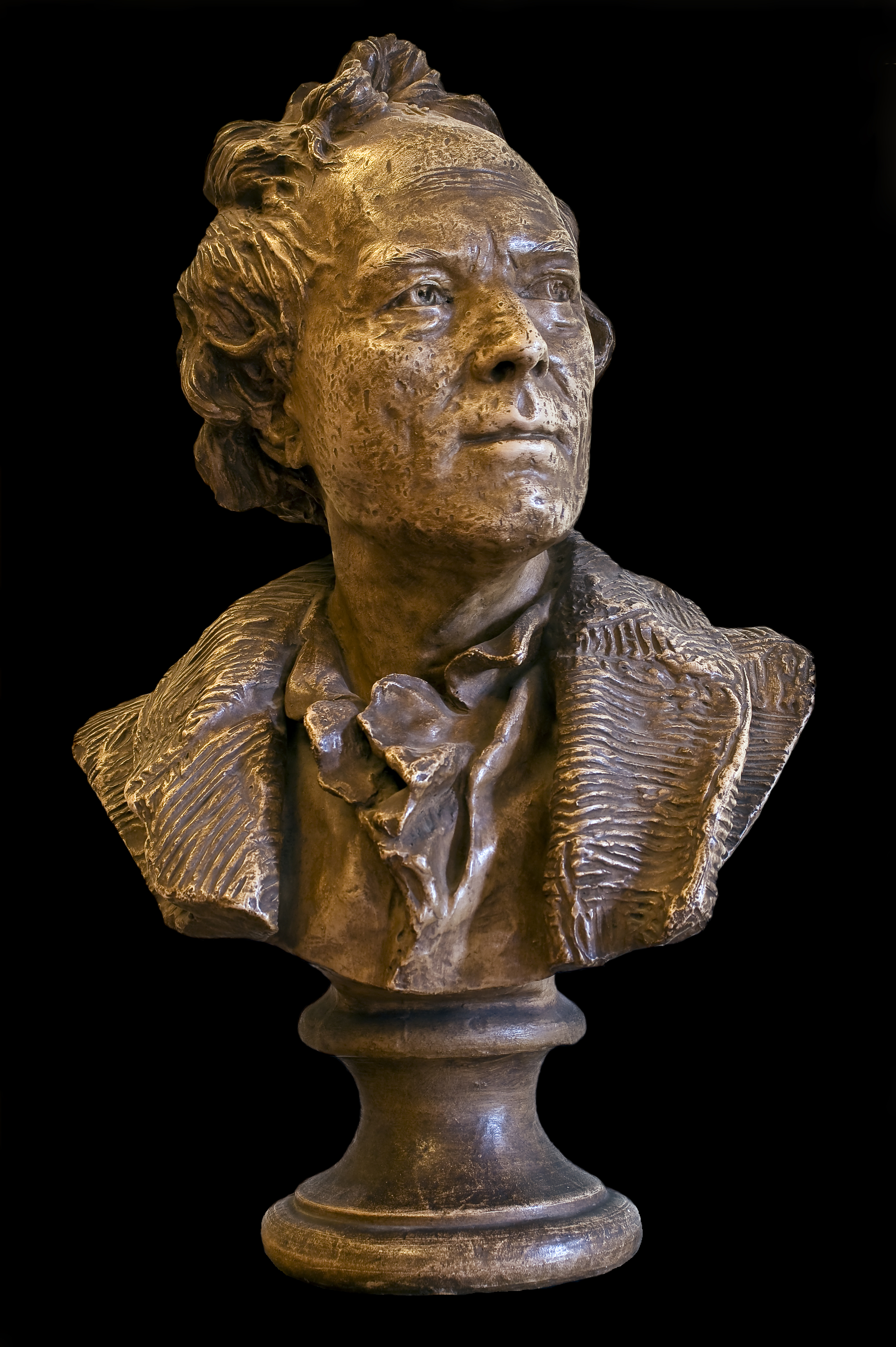
Terracotta bust of C.W. Gluck by Jean-Antoine Houdon

The following discography for Gluck's opera Orfeo ed Euridice is mainly based on the research of Giuseppe Rossi, which appeared in the programme notes to the performance of the work at the 70th Maggio Musicale Fiorentino in 2007, under the title "Discografia – Christoph Willibald Gluck – Orfeo ed Euridice (Orphée et Eurydice)". Rossi's data has been checked against the sources referenced in the notes.

The discography gives the language of the recording as well as the version performed, although the recordings often mix different editions of the work or are even based on new ones created "from scratch." In the most significant cases, such mixed versions are described in detail. The term "pasticcio" (which has no negative connotation in this context) has been used for recordings where the different versions are inextricably mixed.

== List ==
=== Complete recordings ===
Recording data: date and labels	Version/language	Conductor/ director	Cast: Orpheus, Eurydice, Cupid, A blessed spirit	Orchestra and chorus
1940 – Walhall CD	Ricordi/Italian	Erich Leinsdorf	Kerstin Thorborg, Jarmila Novotná, Marita Farell, Annamary Dickey	Orchestra and Chorus of the Metropolitan Opera, New York
1950 – Melodija LP/Dante CD	Paris (1774)/ Russian	Samuil Samosud	Ivan Kozlovskij, Elizaveta Šumskaja, Galina Sakharova	Orchestra and Chorus of the Moscow Radio
1951 – EMI LP/Verona, EMI CD	Ricordi/Italian	Charles Bruck	Kathleen Ferrier, Greet Koeman, Nel Duval	Orchestra and Chorus of De Nederlandse Opera, Amsterdam
1951 – Palladio LP/Urania, Walhall CD	Ricordi/Italian	Wilhelm Furtwängler	Fedora Barbieri, Magda Gabory, Hilde Güden	Orchestra and Chorus of the Teatro alla Scala, Milan
1952 – Urania, BASF, Nixa, Bellaphon Acanta LP/Dante, Preisetr, Cantus Classics CD	Dörffel/German	Arthur Rother	Margarete Klose, Erna Berger, Rita Streich, Fia Fleig	Orchestra and Chorus of the Städtische Oper, Berlin
1953 – Walhall CD	Dörffel/German	Michael Gielen	Hilde Rössel-Majdan, Sena Jurinac, Emmy Loose	Orchestra of Radio Wien and Chorus of the Wiener Staatsoper, Vienna
1954 – G.I.D.D.	Paris (1774)/ French (?)	Nicholas Goldshmidt	Leon Combe, Corie Bijster, Annette de la Bije	Dutch Philharmonic Orchestra and Chorus
1955 – Opera Melodram LP/GDS Records CD	Ricordi/Italian	Pierre Monteux	Risë Stevens, Hilde Güden, Laurel Hurley, Shakeh Varttenissian	Orchestra and Chorus of the Metropolitan Opera, New York
1955 – Pathé, Columbia, EMI LP	Paris (1774)/ French	Louis de Froment	Nicolai Gedda, Janine Micheau, Liliane Berton	Orchestra of the Société des Concerts and Chorus of the Conservatoire of Paris
1956 – Philips CD	Paris (1774)/ French	Hans Rosbaud	Léopold Simoneau, Suzanne Danco, Pierette Alaire	Association des Concerts Lamoureux and Chorus Ensemble Vocal “Roger Blanchard”
1956 – Eklipse CD	Ricordi/Italian	Antonio Pedrotti	Ebe Stignani, Ester Orel, Bruna Rizzoli	Orchestra and Chorus of the RAI of Milan
1956 – DG CD	pasticcio/ German	Ferenc Fricsay	Dietrich Fischer-Dieskau, Maria Stader, Rita Streich	Berlin Radio Symphony Orchestra and Berliner Mottettenchor
1957 – RCA CD	Ricordi/Italian	Pierre Monteux	Risë Stevens, Lisa Della Casa, Roberta Peters	Orchestra and Chorus of the Teatro dell'Opera, Rome
1958 – Omega Opera Archive CD	Ricordi/Italian	Max Rudolf	Risë Stevens, Lucine Amara, Emilia Cundari	Orchestra and Chorus of the Metropolitan Opera, New York
1959 – Opera d'oro, DG CD	Dörffel/Italian	Herbert von Karajan	Giulietta Simionato, Sena Jurinac, Graziella Sciutti	Wiener Philharmoniker and Chorus of the Wiener Staatsoper, Vienna
1962 – Omega Opera Archive CD	Ricordi/Italian	Jean Morel	Kerstin Meyer, Lucine Amara, Anneliese Rothenberger	Orchestra and Chorus of the Metropolitan Opera, New York
1964 – Orfeo CD	Vienna (1762)/ Italian	Ferdinand Leitner	Dietrich Fischer-Dieskau, Elisabeth Söderström, Ruth-Margret Pütz	Cappella Coloniensis and Rundfunkchor, Cologne
1965 – RCA CD	Ricordi/Italian	Renato Fasano	Shirley Verrett, Anna Moffo, Judith Raskin	Orchestra “I Virtuosi di Roma” and Polyphonic Choir, Rome
1966 – Vanguard CD	Vienna (1762)/ Italian	Charles Mackerras	Maureen Forrester, Teresa Stich-Randall, Hanny Staffek	Orchestra of the Wiener Staatsoper and Wiener Akademiechor, Vienna
1966 – EMI LP/Berlin Classics CD	Vienna (1762)/ Italian	Václav Neumann	Grace Bumbry, Anneliese Rothenberger, Ruth-Margret Pütz	Gewandhausorchester Leipzig and Rundfunkchor Leipzig
1967 – DG CD	Vienna (1762)/ Italian	Karl Richter	Dietrich Fischer-Dieskau, Gundula Janowitz, Edda Moser	Münchener Bach-Orchester and Münchener Bach-Chor, Munich
1969 – Decca CD	pasticcio/Italian	Georg Solti	Marilyn Horne, Pilar Lorengar, Helen Donath	Orchestra and Chorus of the Royal Opera House, Covent Garden, London
1970 – Opera d'oro CD	Vienna (1762)/ Italian	Seiji Ozawa	Shirley Verrett, Antonietta Stella, Mariella Adani	Orchestra and Chorus of the RAI of Turin
1971 – Movimento Musica LP/Bensar The Opera Lovers CD	(?)/Italian	Richard Bonynge	Grace Bumbry, Gabriella Tucci, Roberta Peters	Orchestra and Chorus of the Metropolitan Opera, New York
1975 – Gala CD	(?) /Italian	Hans Vonk	Huguette Tourangeau, Catherine Malfitano, Barbara Hendricks	Residentie Orchestra, The Hague, and Nederlands Kamerkoor, Amsterdam
1979 – Hungaroton LP/Laserlight CD	Vienna (1762); Italian	Ervin Lukács	Júlia Hamari, Veronika Kincses, Mária Zempléni	Orchestra and Chorus of the Hungarian State Opera, Budapest
1981 – EMI CD	Vienna (1762)/ Italian	Riccardo Muti	Agnes Baltsa, Margaret Marshall, Edita Gruberova	Philharmonia Orchestra and Ambrosian Opera Chorus, London
1981 – Accent CD	Vienna (1762)/ Italian	Sigiswald Kuijken	René Jacobs, Marjanne Kwecksilber, Magdalena Falewicz	La Petite Bande, Leuven, and Collegium Vocale of Ghent
1982 – Erato CD and Music&Arts CD	Ricordi/Italian	Raymond Leppard	Janet Baker, Elisabeth Speiser, Elizabeth Gale	London Philharmonic Orchestra and Chorus of the Glyndebourne Festival Opera
1982 – Castle Vision VHS/Pioneer Artists LD/Warner Music Vision – Kultur DVD	Ricordi/Italian	Raymond Leppard/ Peter Hall	Janet Baker, Elisabeth Speiser, Elizabeth Gale	London Philharmonic Orchestra and Chorus of the Glyndebourne Festival Opera
1982 – Vipro, Metronome, Philips, Adès LP	Dörffel/Italian	Heinz Panzer	Peter Hofmann, Julia Conwell, Allan Bergius	Philharmonisches Orchester Köln, Cologne, andChor des Dortmunder Musikvereins, Dortmund
1986 – Eurodisc, RCA CD	Vienna (1762)/ Italian	Leopold Hager	Marjana Lipovšek, Lucia Popp, Julie Kaufmann	Münchner Rundfunkorchester and Chorus of the Bayerischer Rundfunk, Munich
1988 – Capriccio CD	Vienna (1762)/ Italian	Hartmut Haenchen	Jochen Kowalski, Dagmar Schellenberger, Christian Fliegner	Carl Philipp Emanuel Bach Chamber Orchestra and Rundfunkchor, Berlin
1989 – EMI CD	Berlioz/French	John Eliot Gardiner	Anne Sofie von Otter, Barbara Hendricks, Brigitte Fournier	Orchestra of the Opéra de Lyon and Monteverdi Choir
1991 – Sony CD	Vienna (1762)/ Italian	Frieder Bernius	Michael Chance, Nancy Argenta, Stefan Beckerbauer	Tafelmusik (directed by Jeanne Lamon) and Kammerchor Stuttgart
1991 – Sonpact CD	Vienna (1762); Italian	Joseph Lamarca	Alain Aubin, Claudine Cheriez, Isabelle Lopez	Orchestre de Chambre d'Aix-en-Provence and Choeur d'Aix en Musique, Aix-en-Provence
1991 – Philips CD	Vienna (1762); Italian	John Eliot Gardiner	Derek Lee Ragin, Sylvia McNair, Cynthia Sieden	English Baroque Soloists and Monteverdi Choir
1991 – Virgin VHS/Pioneer LD/Arthaus DVD	Vienna (1762)/ Italian	Hartmut Haenchen/ Harry Kupfer	Jochen Kowalski, Gillian Webster, Jeremy Budd	Orchestra and Chorus of the Royal Opera House, Covent Garden, London
1991 – Hungaroton DVD	Vienna (1762); Italian	György Vashegyi/ Domokos Moldován	Derek Lee Ragin, Adrienne Csengery, Anna Pánti	Concerto Armonico Chamber Orchestra, Tomkins Vocal Ensemble and Central Europe Dance Company, Budapest
1993 – Forlane CD	Berlioz/French	Patrick Peire	Ewa Podleś, Raphaëlle Farman, Marie-Noëlle de Callataÿ	Collegium Instrumentale Brugense and Capella Brugensis
1993 – Kultur DVD	Paris (1774)/ French	Marco Guidarini/ Stefanos Lazaridis	David Hobson, Amanda Thane, Miriam Gormley,	Australian Opera and Ballet Orchestra and Australian Opera Chorus, Sydney
1994 – Astrée Audivis CD	Vienna (1762)/ Italian	Jean-Claude Malgoire	James Bowman, Lynne Dawson, Claron MacFadden	La Grande Écurie et la Chambre du Roy and Chœr de Chambre de Namur
1995 – Teldec CD	Berlioz/French	Donald Runnicles	Jennifer Larmore, Dawn Upshaw, Alison Hagley	Orchestra and Chorus of the San Francisco Opera House
1998 – Eagle Rock Entertainment VHS/DVD	Vienna (1762)/ Italian	Gustav Kuhn/ Alberto Fassini	Bernadette Manca di Nissa, Paula Almerares, Paola Antonucci	Orchestra, Chorus and Ballet of the Teatro San Carlo, Naples
1998 – ARTS CD	pasticcio/Italian	Peter Maag	Ewa Podleś, Ana Rodrigo, Elena de la Merced	Orquesta Sinfonica de Galicia, A Coruña, and Coro de la Comunidad de Madrid
1998 – Naxos CD	Vienna (1762)/ Italian	Arnold Östman	Kerstin Avemo, Ann-Christine Biel, Maya Boog	Orchestra and Chorus of the Drottningholm Palace Theatre
1999 – Solfa	(?)/Italian	Albert Argudo	Jordi Domènech, Miki Mori, Cristina Obregón	Orquestra Simfònica del Vallés, Sabadell, and Coro de los Amics de l'òpera de Sabadell
1999, Oct 8-23 – Arthaus DVD (later on EMI)	Berlioz/French	John Eliot Gardiner/ Robert Wilson	Magdalena Kožená, Madeline Bender, Patricia Petibon	Orchestre Révolutionnaire et Romantique and Monteverdi Choir
2001 – Harmonia Mundi CD	Vienna (1762)/ Italian	René Jacobs	Bernarda Fink, Verónica Cangemi, María Cristina Kiehr	Freiburger Barockorchester, and RIAS Kammerchor, Berlin
2003 – Farao Classics DVD	Berlioz/French	Ivor Bolton/ Nigel Lowery and Amir Hosseinpour	Vesselina Kasarova, Rosemary Joshua, Deborah York	Chorus and Orchestra of Bayerische Staatsoper, Munich
2004 – Archiv CD	Paris (1774)/ French	Marc Minkowski	Richard Croft, Mireille Delunsch, Marion Harousseau, Claire Delgado-Boge	Les Musiciens du Louvre, Grenoble
2004 – Five Tone DVD	Berlioz/French	Amaury du Closel	Sylvie Sulle, Sophie de Segur, Isabelle Poulenard	Camerata de Versailles and Michel Piquemal vocal ensemble
2005 – Naxos CD	Paris (1774)/ French	Ryan Brown	Jean-Paul Fouchécourt, Catherine Dubosc, Suzie Le Blanc	Orchestra and Chorus of the Opera Lafayette, Washington, D.C.
2010 – BAC Blu-ray/DVD	Paris (1774)/ French	Giampaolo Bisanti	Roberto Alagna, Serena Gamberoni, Marc Barrard	Orchestra and Chorus of the Teatro Comunale, Bologna
2010 – Decca CD	Paris (1774)/ French	Jesús López Cobos	Juan Diego Flórez, Ainhoa Garmendia, Alessandra Marianelli	Coro y Orquesta Titular of the Teatro Real, Madrid
2011 - UNITEL/C MAJOR	Vienna (1762)/ Italian	Gordan Nikolić/Carlus Padrissa	Anita Rachvelishvili, Maite Alberola, Auxiliadora Toledano	Palau de la Musica Catalana Chamber Choir & bandArt Orchestra
2014 - DVD Arthaus Musik/Naxos	Vienna (1762)/ Italian	Václav Luks/Ondrej Halvelka	Bejun Mehta, Eva Liebau, Regula Mühlemann	Collegium Vocale 1704 & Collegium 1704
2015 – Archiv CD	Vienna (1762)/ Italian	Laurence Equilbey	Franco Fagioli, Malin Hartelius, Emmanuelle De Negri	Accentus Chamber Choir, Insula Orchestra
2018 - Blu-ray/DVD Concorde	Paris (1774)/ French	Michele Mariotti/ Hofesh Shechter and John Fulljames	Juan Diego Flórez, Christiane Karg, Fatma Said	Orchestra and Chorus of the Teatro alla Scala, Milan; Hofesh Shechter Company (dance)
2018 - Blu-ray/DVD C Major	Paris (1774)/ French	Harry Bickett/ John Neumeier	Dmitry Korchak, Andriana Chuchman, Lauren Snouffer	Orchestra and Chorus of the Lyric Opera of Chicago; Joffrey Ballet (dance)
2018 – Blu-ray/DVD Naxos	Berlioz/French	Raphaël Pichon/ Aurélien Bory	Marianne Crebassa, Helene Guilmette, Lea Desandre	Orchestra and Chorus of the Ensemble Pygmalion
2018 - Erato CD	pasticcio/Italian	Diego Fasolis	Philippe Jaroussky, Amanda Forsythe, Emőke Baráth	I Barocchisti, Coro della Radiotelevisione svizzera
2024 – Warner Classics / Erato CD	Vienna (1762)/ Italian	Stefan Plewniak	Jakub Józef Orliński, Elsa Dreisig, Fatma Said	Il Giardino d'Amore
2025 - Blu-ray/DVD Dynamic	Paris (1774)/ French	Daniele Gatti/ Pierre Audi	Juan Francisco Gatell, Anna Prohaska, Sara Blanch	Orchestra and Chorus of the Maggio Musicale Fiorentino

=== Main partial recordings ===
Recording data: date and labels	Version/language	Conductor/director	Cast: Orpheus, Eurydice, Cupid, A blessed spirit	Orchestra and chorus
1935 – Pathé, Columbia/Music Memoria, Pearl, Arcadia CD (abridged edition)	Berlioz/French	Henri Tomasi	Alice Raveau, Germaine Feraldy, Jany Delille	Orchestre Symphonique de Paris and Chorus "Alexis Vlassof"
1945 – ATS LP (Act 2)	Ricordi/Italian	Arturo Toscanini	Nan Merriman, Edna Philips	NBC Symphony Orchestra and Robert Shaw Chorale
1947 – Decca LP/Grammofono 2000, Dutton CD (abridged recording)	Ricordi/Italian	Fritz Stiedry	Kathleen Ferrier, Ann Ayars, Zöe Vlachopoulos	Southern Philharmonic Orchestra and Chorus of the Glyndebourne Festival Opera
1952 – RCA (Volume 46 Complete RCA Collection), Urania CD (Act 2)	Ricordi/Italian	Arturo Toscanini	Nan Merriman, Barbara Gibson	NBC Symphony Orchestra and Robert Shaw Chorale
1954 – Heliodor LP (selection)	Dörffel/German	Arthur Rother	Margarete Klose, Anny Schlemm, Rita Streich	Münchner Philharmoniker and Chorus of the Bayerischer Rundfunk, Munich
1960 – Le Chant du Monde LDC LP & CD	Berlioz/French	Charles Bruck	Rita Gorr, Nadine Sautereau, Edith Selig	Orchestre Lyrique de Radio France and Chœur de la Radiodiffusion Française
1960 (or 1962) – EMI LP (selezione)	Dörffel/German	Horst Stein	Hermann Prey, Pilar Lorengar, Erika Köth	Berliner Symphoniker and RIAS Kammerchor, Berlin
