= Gordan Nikolitch =

Serbian violinist (born 1968)

Gordan Nikolitch, also spelled Gordan Nikolić, (Serbian: Гордан Николић; born 1968) is a Franco-Serbian violinist. He was the first concertmaster of the London Symphony Orchestra for nearly 20 years, having stepped down in October 2017 to concentrate on directing and teaching.

== Biography and career ==
Born in a music loving family, Gordan Nikolitch began playing the violin when he was seven. He studied at the music conservatory in Basel, Switzerland, with Jean-Jacques Kantorow. He also met and worked with Walter Levin, Wytold Lutoslavsky, György Kurtág, Hans Werner Henze etc, cultivating an interest in contemporary music.

As a violinist, he participated and was awarded in many competitions, the Tibor Varga competition, Paganini competition at Genoa, Italy, Brescia and Vaclav Hummel competition at Zagreb. In 1989, he became concertmaster of Orchestre d'Auvergne, a post he held until 1999.

Nikolitch has been as well the leader of the Orchestre de Chambre de Lausanne and the Chamber Orchestra of Europe. Prince consort professor at the Royal College of Music in London, giving masterclasses at the Guildhall School of Music and Drama, he also teaches Master since 2005 at the CODARTS, Rotterdam Conservatory of Music and since 2017 he is professor at the Hochschule für Musik Saarbrücken. Since September 2021, he is appointed as a violin teacher at Paris Conservatoire CNSMdP.

In 2004 he was named artistic director of the Netherlands Chamber Orchestra, Amsterdam, a group created in the 1950es by Szymon Goldberg, the concertmaster of the Berlin Philharmonic from the times of their conductor Wilhelm Furtwängler. It was more than natural to take the same approach of directing from the concertmaster position and the hundreds of concerts played in the Concertgebouw Amsterdam have been oriented towards the flexible interaction of all musicians involved. Playing in the hall of the Royal Concertgebouw with this group of musicians became a source of inspiration that helps define the platform of ideas on music making.

2006-2011 he was Musical Director of St George Strings, an orchestra based in Belgrade, Serbia.

Since 2007 Musical Director of BandArt orchestra with among others performances of operas Gluck’s Orpheo, and Mozart’s Idomeneo, in festivals of Peralada, Ludwigsbourg, Luzern. The latest collaboration with OSCyL featured on the programme the Schubert “Unfinished” and Bruckner 9 symphonies.

Nikolitch shares his experience by directing many other orchestras, among them Orquesta Nacional d'España, Orquesta d'opera Madrid, Orchestre National D'Île de France, London Symphony Orchestra, Orchestre de chambre de Geneve, Antwerp Symphony Orchestra, Tapiola Sinfonietta, Australian Chamber Orchestra, Manchester Camerata, Radio Simfonijski orkestar Slovenija, OSCyL etc.

He plays violins by Paul Belin (fecit anno 2016) and a Petrus Guarnerius offered for use by a generous sponsor, with bows by F.X. Tourte and J.P.M. Persoit, having in the past played violins by Giuseppe Guarneri, Gaspare Lorenzini, Matteo Goffriler and Lorenzo Storioni.

== A list of records (non exhaustive) ==
- Mozart. Piano Concertos Nos. 15 & 27. Martin Helmchen, Gordan Nikolić, Netherlands Chamber Orchestra. PENTATONE PTC 5186508 (2013)
- Franz Schubert. Symphonies Nos. 4 & 5. Gordan Nikolić, Netherlands Chamber Orchestra. PENTATONE PTC 5186340 (2009)
- Mozart. Serenade in D, KV250 "Haffner". Gordan Nikolić, Netherlands Chamber Orchestra. PENTATONE PTC 5186097 (2008)
- Mozart. Piano Concertos Nos. 13 & 24. Gordan Nikolić, Martin Helmchen, Netherlands Chamber Orchestra. PENTATONE PTC 5186305 (2007)
- Joseph Haydn. Symphony No. 100 "Military" & Sinfonia Concertante & L'isola Disabitata. Gordan Nikolić, Herre-Jan Stegenga, Toon Durville, Margreet Bongers, Netherlands Chamber Orchestra. PENTATONE PTC 5186300 (2007)
- Mozart. Sinfonia concertante K.364 & Rondo for Violin and Orchestra K.373 & Concertone K.190. Yakov Kreizberg, Julia Fischer, Gordan Nikolić, Hans Meyer, Herre-Jan Stegenga, Netherlands Chamber Orchestra. PENTATONE PTC 5186098 (2007)
- Benjamin Britten, Béla Bartók, Karl Amadeus Hartmann. Various works. Gordan Nikolić, Netherlands Chamber Orchestra. PENTATONE PTC 5186056 (2005)
- Johannes Brahms. Symphonies Nos.1-4; Double Concerto; Serenade No.2. Bernard Haitink, Timothy Hugh, London Symphony Orchestra. LSO Live Rel. 4 Oct 2005 Recorded 2003–2004
- Gounod Charles symphonies Gordan Nikolić, Netherlands Chamber Orchestra TACET (record label)
- Mozart Haffner and Linzner Symphonies, Gordan Nikolic, Netherlands Chamber Orchestra TACET (record label)
- Mozart violin concerto no.5, Noa Wildschut, dir Nikolić, Warner Classics (record label)
- Martinson Rolf various works Lisa Larsson soprano, Gordan Nikolić, Netherlands Chamber Orchestra
- Beethoven violin concerto piano version Dejan Lazić, dir Nikolić, Onyx Classics (record label)
- Beethoven Triple concerto LSO, Haitink, Vogt, Hugh, Nikolić, LSO LIVE (record label)
- Schumann piano chamber music, Eric le Sage and friends, ALPHA (record label)
- Mozart Violin Concertos 1 & 5, KV 207 and 219, Nikolić, TACET (record label)
- Mozart Sinfonia Concertante KV364 and g-minor Symphony KV550, Nikolić, Wolfe, TACET (record label)
- Mozart Symphonies 39 and Jupiter, KV543 and KV551, Nikolić, TACET (record label)
