= Martin Helmchen =

German pianist (born 1982)

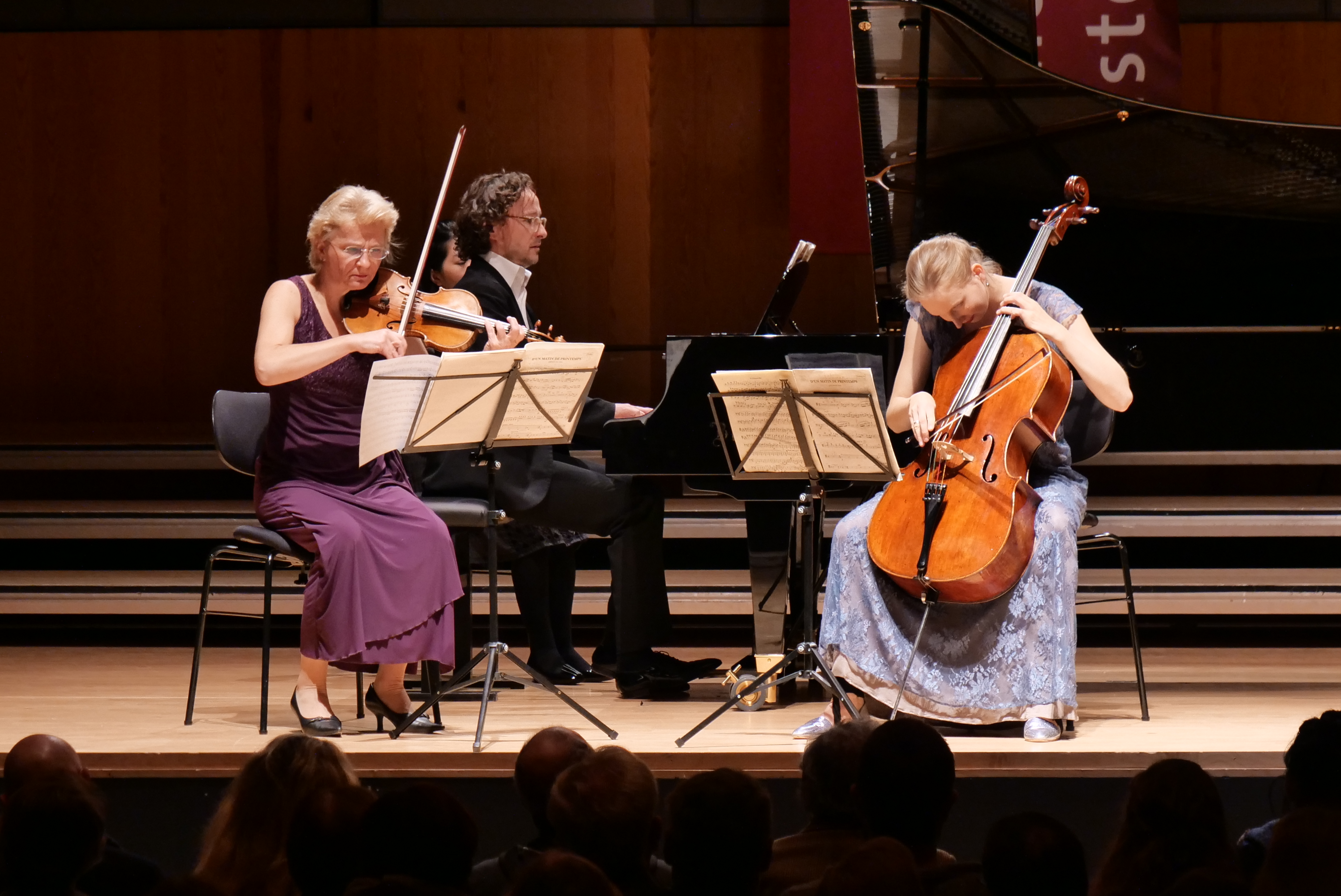
Weithaas, Helmchen, Hecker in 2019

Martin Helmchen (born 1982) is a German pianist. He has played with international orchestras and has recorded discs of many classical composers.

== Life ==
Helmchen was born in Berlin. He began his piano studies at the age of six, and graduated from the Hanns Eisler Music Conservatory as a student of Galina Iwanzowa, and in 2001 from the Hochschule für Musik und Theater Hannover as a student of Arie Vardi.

== Career ==
He was a featured soloist in the BBC New Generation Artists program from 2005 to 2007. Helmchen has given concerts with the San Francisco Symphony, the Vienna Philharmonic, the Deutschen Symphonie-Orchester Berlin and the NHK Symphony Orchestra. His specialty is chamber music, where he has performed extensively with Heinrich Schiff and Marie-Elisabeth Hecker. Collaborations with further artists have included Gidon Kremer, Christian Tetzlaff, Sharon Kam, Tabea Zimmermann, Juliane Banse, Julia Fischer, Sabine Meyer and Lars Vogt.

Helmchen's first orchestral CD was released in 2007 with piano concerti from Mozart, and his first solo CD with works of Schubert was released in 2008. In 2009, two further CDs were released:

- with the Orchestre Philharmonique de Strasbourg: Robert Schumann, Piano Concerto a minor op. 54 and Antonín Dvořák, Piano Concerto g minor op.33
- with Sharon Kam und Gustav Rivinius, Johannes Brahms, Two Sonatas for Clarinet and Piano, op. 120 and Trio for Piano, Clarinet, and Violoncello op. 114

He made his American debut in 2011 when he played at Tanglewood with the Boston Symphony Orchestra. The same year he performed with Dohnanyi and the Chicago Symphony Orchestra.

== Awards ==
In 2001 he won the Clara Haskil International Piano Competition. In 2003 he won the International Kissinger Klavierolymp Competition, related to the festival Kissinger Sommer. In 2006 he was awarded the Crédit Suisse Award, for his debut with the Vienna Philharmonic, directed by Valery Gergiev, playing Schumann's Piano Concerto at the Lucerne Festival. In the same year he received the ECHO Klassik Prize as together with cellist Danjulo Ishizaka for their CD with works from Felix Mendelssohn, César Franck, Benjamin Britten (2005, Sony Classical).

== Selected discography ==
- Franz Schubert – Complete Works for Violin and Piano. Julia Fischer, Martin Helmchen. PENTATONE PTC 5186519 (2014 – re-issue)
- Creating Timeless Classics. Works by Robert Schumann, Peter Ilyich Tchaikovsky, Johann Sebastian Bach, Ludwig van Beethoven, Howard Blake. Martin Helmchen, Arabella Steinbacher, Nareh Arghamanyan, Mari Kodama, Julia Fischer, Russian National Orchestra, Concertgebouw Chamber Orchestra, Academy of St Martin in the Fields, Orchestre de la Suisse Romande. PENTATONE PTC 5186531 (2014).
- Mozart – Piano Concertos Nos. 15 & 27. Martin Helmchen, Gordan Nikolić, Netherlands Chamber Orchestra. PENTATONE PTC 5186508 (2013).
- Robert Schumann – Waldszenen, Symphonische Etüden, Arabeske. Martin Helmchen PENTATONE PTC 5186452 (2012)
- Vincent D'Indy – Camille Saint-Saëns – Ernest Chausson Orchestral Works. Martin Helmchen, Marek Janowski, Orchestre de la Suisse Romande. PENTATONE PTC 5186357 (2011).
- Franz Schubert – Complete Works for Violin and Piano, Volume 2. Julia Fischer, Martin Helmchen. PENTATONE PTC 5186348 (2010).
- Felix Mendelssohn Bartholdy The Piano Concertos & Rondo brilliant. Martin Helmchen, Philippe Herreweghe, Antwerp Symphony Orchestra. PENTATONE PTC 5186366 (2010).
- Franz Schubert – Trout Quintet & Variations on Trockne Blumen & Piano Trio. Martin Helmchen, Christian Tetzlaff, Antoine Tamestit, Marie-Elisabeth Hecker, Alois Posch, Aldo Baerten. PENTATONE PTC 5186334 (2009).
- Schumann & Dvořák – Piano Concertos. Marc Albrecht, Martin Helmchen, Orchestre Philharmonique de Strasbourg. PENTATONE PTC 5186333 (2009).
- Franz Schubert – Complete Works for Violin and Piano, Volume 1. Julia Fischer, Martin Helmchen. PENTATONE PTC 5186347 (2009)
- Franz Schubert – Piano Sonata & 6 Moments musicaux. Martin Helmchen. PENTATONE PTC 5186329 (2008).
- Mozart – Piano Concertos Nos. 13 & 24. Gordan Nikolić, Martin Helmchen, Netherlands Chamber Orchestra. PENTATONE PTC 5186305 (2007).
- Beethoven – Piano Concertos Nos. 2 & 5. Andrew Manze, Martin Helmchen, Deutsches Symphonie-Orchester Berlin. ALPHA ALPHA-555 (2019).
