= Lisa Larsson =

Swedish opera singer (born 1967)

- Birth name: Eva Astrid Elisabeth Larsson
- Born: 14 February 1967 (age 58); Växjö Municipality, Sweden
- Genres: Classical music
- Occupation(s): opera singer, recitalist
- Instrument: Vocals
- Years active: 1995–present
- Labels: Challenge Classics
- Website: www.lisalarsson.info

Lisa Larsson (born 14 February 1967) is a Swedish classical soprano singer.

== Career ==
Larsson studied in Basel and since 1993 appeared in the Internationales Opernstudio of the Zurich Opera House under conductors such as Franz Welser-Möst, Nikolaus Harnoncourt and Christoph von Dohnányi.

She has performed at La Scala Milan, Opera de Lausanne, Komische Oper Berlin and with the Basel Opera Company. She has sung at European festivals such as the Glyndebourne Festival Opera, the Salzburg Easter Festival and The BBC Proms.

As a concert singer, Larsson has appeared with the Berliner Philharmonic under Claudio Abbado, the Orchestra of the Age of Enlightenment under Nicholas McGegan or the Tonhalle Orchester Zürich under Christopher Hogwood.

She took part in the project of Ton Koopman and the Amsterdam Baroque Orchestra & Choir to record the complete vocal works of Johann Sebastian Bach.

More recent productions she has been part of as a soloist include works of Rolf Martinsson.

== Discography ==
- 2013: Ladies First! Opera arias by Joseph Haydn; Combattimento Consort Amsterdam, Jan Willem de Vriend (Challenge Classics)
- 2014: La Captive – Hector Berlioz; Het Gelders Orkest, Antonello Manacorda (Challenge Classics)
- 2014: Gustav Mahler: Symphony No. 4; Het Gelders Orkest, Antonello Manacorda (Challenge Classics)
- 2018: Rolf Martinsson: Presentiment; Royal Stockholm Philharmonic Orchestra, Andrew Manze, Sakari Oramo (BIS Records)
- 2019: Martinsson: Garden of Devotion; Netherlands Chamber Orchestra, Gordan Nikolić (Challenge Classics)
