= Julia Fischer =

German classical violinist and pianist

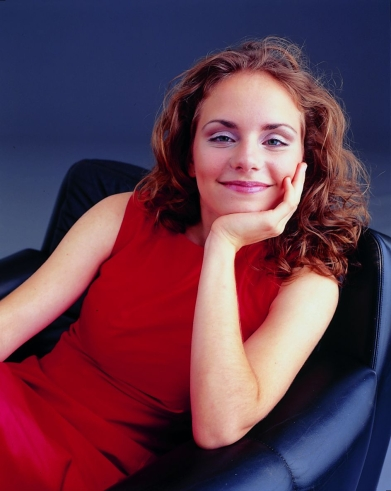
- Fischer in 2006
- Born: 15 June 1983 (age 43); Munich, West Germany
- Education: Munich University of Music and Performing Arts with Ana Chumachenco
- Occupations: Violinist violist pianist violin professor
- Years active: 1995–present
- Awards: Yehudi Menuhin International Competition for Young Violinists Junior category 1st Prize 1995; Gramophone Classical Music Awards 2007 Artist of the year
- Website: JuliaFischer.com

Julia Fischer (born 15 June 1983) is a German classical violinist, violist, and pianist. She teaches at the University of Music and Theatre Munich and performs up to 60 times per year.

== Biography ==
Julia Fischer is of German–Slovak ancestry. Her parents met as students in Prague. Her mother is Viera Fischer (née Krenková). Her father, Frank-Michael Fischer, a mathematician from East Germany, also moved from Eastern Saxony to West Germany in 1972. In addition to German, Fischer is also fluent in English and French.

Fischer started playing the violin before her fourth birthday and received her first lesson from Helge Thelen. A few months later, she began taking piano lessons from her mother. Fischer once said, "My mother is a pianist and I wanted to play the piano as well, but since my elder brother also played the piano, I thought it would be nice to learn another instrument. I agreed to try out the violin and stayed with it." Fischer also supports her mother's belief that musical education of any kind should include piano fundamentals to extend one's repertoire and knowledge of harmony, theory, and style.

At the age of eight, she began her formal violin education at the Leopold Mozart Conservatory in Augsburg, under the tutelage of Lydia Dubrowskaya. When she was nine years old, she was admitted to the University of Music and Theatre Munich, where she worked with Ana Chumachenco.

When she was twelve years old she played Beethoven's Violin Concerto for the first time in her mother's home town in East Slovakia, and later played it again with Yehudi Menuhin in Vienna. Beethoven was also her mother's and brother's favourite composer. Fischer's parents divorced when she was thirteen. As a teenager she was inspired by Glenn Gould, Evgeny Kissin, and Maxim Vengerov.

== Competitions ==
Two competitions defined Fischer's early career as a professional violinist. The most prestigious competition Fischer won was the 1995 International Yehudi Menuhin Violin Competition, which took place in Folkestone under the supervision of Yehudi Menuhin.

Her performance earned her first prize in the junior category as well as all of the special prizes, including the Bach prize for the best solo performance of the composer's work.

Music journalist Edward Greenfield said, "I first heard Julia Fischer in 1995 as a 12-year-old in the Yehudi Menuhin Violin Competition. Not only did she win outright in the junior category, but she was manifestly more inspired than anyone in the senior category."

Her teacher at the University of Music and Theatre Munich, Ana Chumachenco, kept Fischer down to earth by making her practise difficult pieces of Sarasate. In 1996, she won another major contest, the Eighth Eurovision Competition for Young Instrumentalists in Lisbon, which was broadcast in 22 countries.

== Career ==
=== Solo artist ===
Fischer started her career early, although she attended school (the Gymnasium) up to the age of 19, learning mathematics and physics as well as music, and passed the Abitur in spring 2002. She has been giving concerts since she was 11 and started teaching as a violin professor at 23.

Fischer has worked with many internationally acclaimed conductors, such as Simon Rattle, Lorin Maazel, Christoph Eschenbach, Yakov Kreizberg, Yuri Temirkanov, Sir Neville Marriner, David Zinman, Zdeněk Mácal, Jun Märkl, Ruben Gazarian, Marek Janowski, Herbert Blomstedt, and Michael Tilson Thomas. She has also worked with a variety of top German, American, British, Polish, French, Italian, Swiss, Dutch, Norwegian, Russian, Japanese, Czech, and Slovak orchestras.

She has performed in most European countries, the United States, Brazil and Japan. Her concerts have been broadcast on TV and radio in every major European country and many have been featured on U.S., Japanese, and Australian radio stations.

=== Lorin Maazel as mentor ===
Lorin Maazel, chief conductor of the Munich-based Bavarian Radio Symphony Orchestra from 1993 to 2002, was Fischer's mentor since 1997. He used to perform in a concert with Fischer at least once a year. Maazel made Fischer perform as a soloist with the Bavarian Radio Symphony Orchestra first at the Bad Kissingen festival and then, in March 2000, in Munich, where the competition was fierce.

=== Carnegie Hall debut ===
2003 was a pivotal year in Fischer's career, including her Carnegie Hall debut, when she received standing ovations for her performance of Brahms' Double Concerto with Lorin Maazel and the Bavarian Radio Symphony Orchestra.

In 2003 Fischer also performed for the first time with the Berlin Philharmonic under Lorin Maazel as well as with the London Symphony Orchestra. Despite the added complication of the programme change two weeks before the concert, from the Beethoven violin concerto to the Bartók violin concerto, which Fischer had never played before, she mastered it.

Following numerous performances in the U.S. over the previous six years, in 2003 Fischer also performed with the New York Philharmonic under the baton of Lorin Maazel, playing the Sibelius Violin Concerto in New York's Lincoln Center, as well as the Mendelssohn Violin concerto in Vail, Colorado.

She has toured with Sir Neville Marriner and the Academy of St Martin in the Fields, Herbert Blomstedt and the Leipzig Gewandhaus Orchestra, the Royal Philharmonic Orchestra and the Dresden Philharmonic.

In 2006, Fischer was appointed as a professor at the Frankfurt University of Music and Performing Arts. She was Germany's youngest professor at the time. In fall of 2011, Fischer took over her former teacher Ana Chumachenco's chair at the University of Music and Theatre Munich.

At the 2011 Salzburg Easter Festival, Fischer played the violin concerto of Alban Berg with Simon Rattle and the Berlin Philharmonic. In May 2013 she performed for the first time with the Vienna Philharmonic under Esa-Pekka Salonen, playing the violin concertos of Esa-Pekka Salonen and Ludwig van Beethoven.

=== At the Proms ===
When Fischer played the Dvořák violin concerto with David Zinman and the Tonhalle-Orchester Zürich at the BBC Proms on 21 July 2014, the concerto was recorded and received excellent reviews:

"Julia Fischer turns in a splendid account of the Dvořák violin concerto. She plays with her usual fine sense for judicious tempos, a wide range of imaginatively applied dynamics, beautiful intonation, and spectacular technique. She is very poetic in the lovely second movement and in the outer panels she plays with a true dynamism, catching all the drama and joy in the music. [...] I cited Fischer's technique above: you may well watch and listen in awe to her incredibly subtle and utterly dazzling encore performance of the finale of the Hindemith Solo Violin Sonata in G minor."

=== The Beethoven violin concerto ===
In the 2018–2019 concert season Fischer played the Beethoven violin concerto with Michael Tilson Thomas and the London Symphony Orchestra in London on 30 May 2019.

== Awards ==
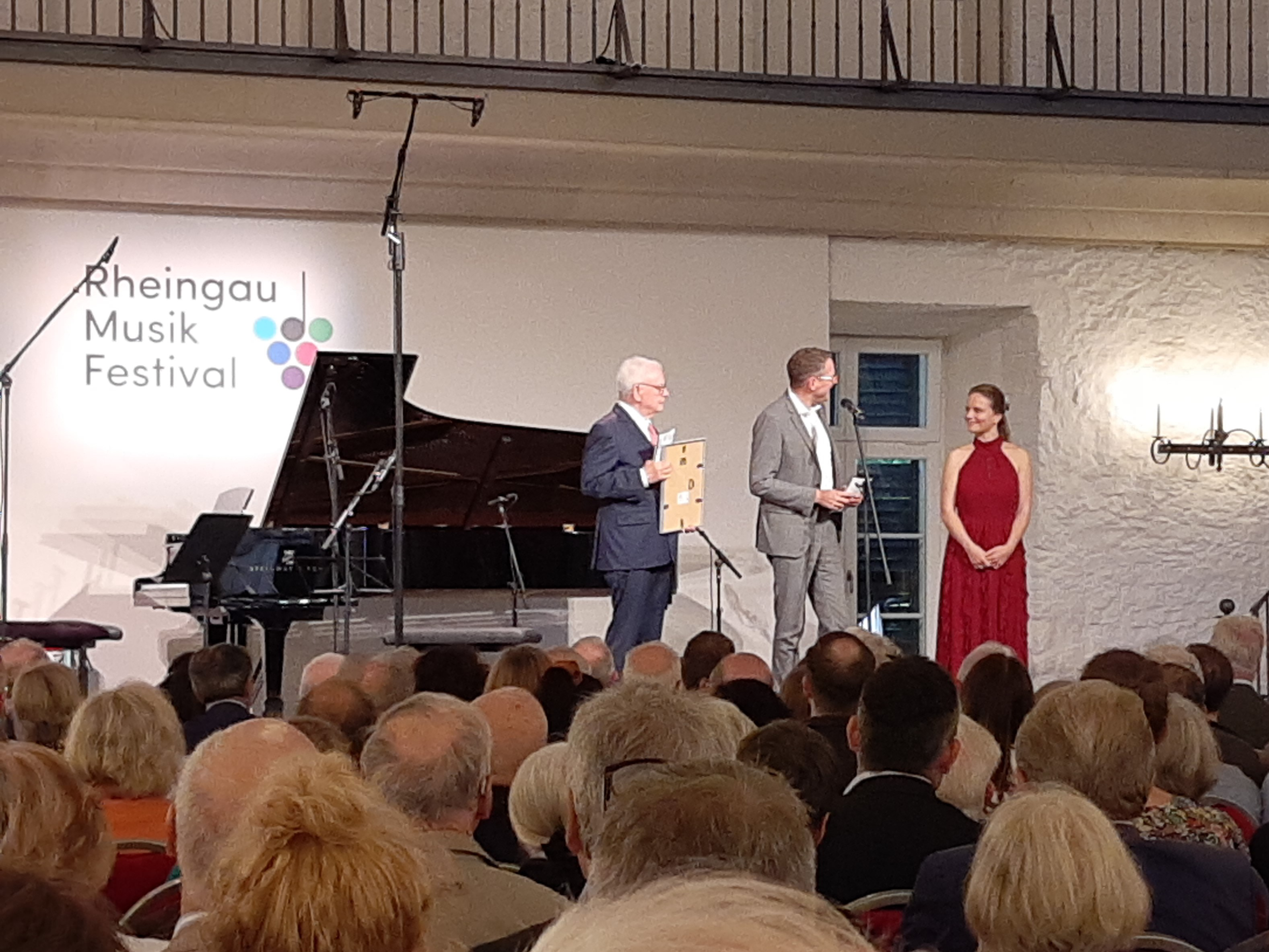
Fischer receiving the Rheingau Musik Preis in 2024

Fischer was selected as one of 16 Violinists of the Century, alongside Jascha Heifetz and Yehudi Menuhin, for the 20-CD box set of the Süddeutsche Zeitung in 2006. She was nominated Gramophone Classical Music Awards 2007 Artist of the year, succeeding Martha Argerich (1999) and preceding Hilary Hahn (2008). She was awarded the 2024 Rheingau Musik Preis on 4 July 2024 before a chamber music concert at Schloss Johannisberg.

== Soloist on the violin and piano ==
Fischer is a soloist who can expertly play both the violin part and the piano part of sonatas. Practicing both parts of Beethoven sonatas is the way her musical education began at the age of 4. This approach has enhanced her understanding of the harmony and style of the works she plays as a violinist.

She stopped practicing the piano for a few months while she was preparing for the Menuhin Competition in 1995 where she won 1st prize in the junior category.

On 1 January 2008, Fischer had her public debut as a pianist, performing Edvard Grieg's Piano Concerto in A minor with the Junge Deutsche Philharmonie at the Alte Oper, Frankfurt. The concert was conducted by Matthias Pintscher, who stepped in for Sir Neville Marriner. On the same occasion, she also performed the Violin Concerto No. 3 in B minor by Camille Saint-Saëns. Fischer performed this concert once more in Saint Petersburg on 4 January 2008.

== Fischer about performing ==
Fischer once said: "What is helpful for a career is that it is always about the music and not about the career. As soon as a young musician decides for certain reasons to have a career instead of using musical reasons, I can guarantee that it will be – if it will be at all – a short career. I truly believe that if someone wants to spend his professional life with music, he will – either as a soloist, orchestra member, teacher, concert promoter, or agent – in the end, it is unimportant. One should choose to become a musician because one believes that the world needs music and without music, the emotional life of human beings is going to die. Everything else will come with dedication and hard work."

In an interview in May 2006, she said the Beethoven violin concerto is probably the concerto she likes most. Her mother taught Fischer and her brother to play the piano just for the love of classical music. The jury of the 2006 BBC Music Magazine Awards said, "There are many recordings of Bach's works for solo violin but rarely do they reach such breathtaking heights of musicianship as this one. Julia Fischer is an incredible technician and soulful musician who does not let an ounce of ego come between the music and the listener."

In 2010, a critic for the Guardian wrote: "Although still in her mid-20s, she has been playing Bach for nearly two decades, in a daily act of private worship. [...] Fischer's full-blooded sound still allows for breathtaking precision: with her perfect understanding of the even rhythm and mounting tension at the work's core, she held the audience in a vise-like grip."

"On a concert stage, performing music by Bach, Schubert or Sibelius, the superb young German violinist Julia Fischer is the picture of focus and discipline. Offstage, she's just the same." (Joshua Kosman about Julia Fischer 3 June 2009)

== Chamber music ==
In 2011, Fischer founded the Fischer quartet with Alexander Sitkovetsky (violin), Nils Mönkemeyer (viola), and Benjamin Nyffenegger (cello). The quartet went on tour in early 2018 with stops in Leipzig, London, Luxembourg, Munich and Zurich. Music partners in chamber music are Daniel Müller-Schott (cello), Milana Chernyavska, Yulianna Avdeeva, and Igor Levit (piano).

== Repertoire ==
The composers Fischer spent the most time with are Beethoven, Bach, Dvořák, Schubert and Brahms. Her active repertoire spans from Bach to Penderecki, from Vivaldi to Shostakovich, containing over 40 works with orchestra and about 60 works of chamber music. She is known for her performance of Bach's work, winning the Bach prize at the 1995 Menuhin competition and the 2006 BBC Music Magazine Awards Best Newcomer for the CD Johann Sebastian Bach, Sonatas and Partitas for solo violin (BWV 1001–1006).

== Instruments ==
Currently, Fischer plays a Guadagnini 1742 purchased in May 2004, and also a violin by Philipp Augustin 2011, which she has owned since 2012. For four years prior to that, she had been using a Stradivarius, the 1716 Booth, on loan from Nippon Music Foundation, an instrument that had previously belonged to another violinist, Iona Brown. She usually uses a Benoît Rolland bow, but sometimes a copy of the Heifetz Tourte by the Viennese maker Thomas Gerbeth for early Classical period music.

Fischer said in August 2010: "I played on an adult-sized violin (4/4) ever since I was ten years old. The quality of my instruments improved as time passed: Ventapane, Gagliano, and then Testore, up to a Guarneri del Gesù in 1998. However, I wasn't satisfied with that violin, and changed to a Stradivarius — the 1716 Booth, property of the Nippon Music Foundation — on which I played for four years, with which I was well pleased. However, I always wanted to have an instrument of my very own. Thus, six years ago, in London, I bought, with the advice of the concertmaster of the Academy of St. Martin in the Fields, who is one of my best friends, the 1742 Guadagnini."

== Recordings ==
In fall 2004, the label Pentatone released Fischer's first CD: Russian violin concertos with Yakov Kreizberg and the Russian National Orchestra. It received rave reviews, climbing into the top five best-selling classical records in Germany within a few days and receiving an "Editor's Choice" from Gramophone in January 2005. Other critically acclaimed recordings include J. S. Bach's sonatas and partitas for solo violin, the Mozart violin concerto and the Tchaikovsky violin concerto. After five years with Pentatone, in 2009, Fischer signed a contract with Decca Classics.

She has published a number of acclaimed and awarded CDs for Pentatone (Russian violin concertos, the Solo Sonatas, and Partitas by Bach, the Mendelssohn Trios, the Mozart concertos, the Brahms Vc. and Double Concerto) as well as for Decca (Bach Violin concertos, Paganini 24 Caprices for Violin solo, Impressionistic music under the title 'Poème', and the Dvorak/Bruch combi Made in Switzerland) plus two DVDs (Vivaldi, The Four Seasons and her New Year's Concert 2008 in Frankfurt, where she soloed both on violin and piano).

== Fischer about recording ==
About recording for Pentatone, Fischer once said: "I had offers from big companies but none appealed. You don't have to record. Yakov [Kreizberg] spoke to the people at Pentatone and to me and put us together. Pentatone more or less gave me carte blanche as to what I record and the musicians I work with are my choice; all these things were so important to me. I record to experience something and to help my playing and music-making. For the concerto CD, Yakov and I really talked about the pieces; I learnt so much by that."

According to Strings Magazine, "When Kreizberg asked her to record with the Russian National Orchestra, she said yes, but privately wondered whether it would come to pass, knowing that such impulsive recording plans often disappear into thin air. Still after their last performance in Philadelphia, Kreizberg already had the dates and suddenly Fischer, who had not even decided whether she wanted to start recording regularly, had a three-year, seven-CD contract with PentaTone, the new high-tech Dutch label headed by former Philips Classics executives, and one of the first labels to embrace the new SACD 5.1-channel surround-sound technology."

The article went on to say that "Although she still wavered, what decided her to sign on the dotted line was that all the concerto recordings would be conducted by Kreizberg."

== Prizes and honors ==
Fischer has won five prizes for her violin playing and three prizes for her piano playing at Jugend musiziert. She won all eight competitions she entered. In 1997, Fischer was awarded the "Prix d'Espoir" by the Foundation of European Industry. She had the opportunity to play Mozart's own violin in the room in which he was born at Salzburg to honour the 250th anniversary of his birth.

- 1995: 1st Prize at the international Yehudi Menuhin competition, in addition to a special prize, "Best Bach Solo-work".
- 1996: Winner 8th Eurovision Competition for Young Instrumentalists in Lisbon
- 1997: Prix d'Espoir the prize of the European music industry
- 1997: Soloist prize of the festival "Mecklenburg-Western Pomerania"
- 1998: EIG Music Award
- 2000: Promotion prize Deutschlandfunk
- 2005: ECHO Klassik Award for the CD Russian Violin Concertos
- 2005: Winner of the Beethoven Ring
- 2006: During the celebrations of Mozart's birthday in his hometown Salzburg, Fischer played on Mozart's violin (with Daniel Müller-Schott and Jonathan Gilad). About the event, she says: "During the first hour I couldn't play anything I wanted, because during the days of Mozart the violins were a lot shorter and I wasn't used to that".
- 2006: "BBC Music Magazine Awards 2006 Best Newcomer" for the CD Johann Sebastian Bach, Sonatas and Partitas for solo violin (BWV 1001–1006).
- 2007: The Classic FM Gramophone Awards Artist of the Year.
- 2007: ECHO Klassik Award for the CD Tchaikovsky Violin Concerto
- 2009: MIDEM Classical Award as "Instrumentalist of 2008".
- 2023: Solo violinist at the 2023 Nobel Prize Concert
- 2024: Rheingau Musik Preis

== Private life ==
Fischer is married and has two children. She lives in Gauting, a suburb of her home town of Munich.

== Discography ==
Release	Composer/Title of work	Performer	Label/Catalog no.	Format
2002/08	Brahms: Piano Quartet in G minor, Op. 25	Tatjana Masurenko (viola); Gustav Rivinius (cello); Lars Vogt (piano)	EMI Classics 5573772	CD
2002/10	Vivaldi: The Four Seasons	Academy of St. Martin in the Fields	Opus Arte/BBC OA0895D	DVD-Video
2004/08	Russian Violin Concertos: Khachaturian Violin Concerto in D minor, op. 46; Prokofiev No. 1 in D major, Op. 19; Glazunov Violin Concerto in A minor, Op. 82	Russian National Orchestra; Yakov Kreizberg (conductor)	PENTATONE PTC 5186 059	Hybrid SACD
2005/03	Bach: Sonatas and Partitas for Solo Violin, BWV 1001–1006		PENTATONE PTC 5186 072	Hybrid SACD
2005/08	Mozart: Violin Concertos Nos 3 & 4; Adagio in E major, K. 261; Rondo in B flat, K. 269	Netherlands Chamber Orchestra; Yakov Kreizberg (conductor)	PENTATONE PTC 5186 064	Hybrid SACD
2006/06	Mendelssohn: Piano Trios Nos. 1 & 2	Jonathan Gilad (piano); Daniel Müller-Schott (cello)	PENTATONE PTC 5186 085	Hybrid SACD
2006/09	Mozart: Violin Concertos Nos 1, 2 & 5	Netherlands Chamber Orchestra; Yakov Kreizberg (conductor)	PENTATONE PTC 5186 094	Hybrid SACD
2006/10	Tchaikovsky: Violin Concerto in D major, Op. 35; Sérénade mélancolique, Op. 26; Valse–Scherzo, Op. 34; Souvenir d'un lieu cher, Op. 42	Russian National Orchestra; Yakov Kreizberg (conductor)/(piano, Op. 42)	PENTATONE PTC 5186 095	Hybrid SACD
2007/04	Brahms: Violin Concerto in D major, Op. 77; Double Concerto in A minor, Op. 102	Netherlands Philharmonic Orchestra; Yakov Kreizberg (conductor); Daniel Müller-Schott (cello)	PENTATONE PTC 5186 066	Hybrid SACD
2007/10	Mozart: Sinfonia concertante for Violin, Viola and Orchestra in E flat, K. 364; Rondo in C major, K. 373; Concertone for 2 Violins and Orchestra in C major, K. 190	Netherlands Chamber Orchestra; Yakov Kreizberg (conductor); Gordan Nikolic (second solo violin, K. 190)/(viola, K. 364)	PENTATONE PTC 5186 098	Hybrid SACD
2009/01	Bach: Concert for 2 Violins, Strings and Continuo in D minor, BWV 1043; Violin Concerto in A minor, BWV 1041; Violin Concerto in E major, BWV 1042; Concerto for Violin and Oboe in C-Moll, BWV 1060	Academy of St. Martin in the Fields; Alexander Sitkovetsky (second solo violin, BWV 1043); Andrey Rubtsov (oboe, BWV 1060)	Decca 478 0650	CD
2009/08	Schubert Complete Works for Violin and Piano, Volume 1: Sonata for Violin and Piano in D major, D. 384 (Op. 137, No. 1); Sonata for Violin and Piano in A minor, D. 385 (Op. 137, No. 2); Sonata for Violin and Piano in G minor, D. 408 (Op. 137, No. 3); Rondo for Violin and Piano in B minor "Rondo Brillant", D. 895 (Op. 70)	Martin Helmchen (piano)	PENTATONE PTC 5186 347	Hybrid SACD
2010/04	Schubert Complete Works for Violin and Piano, Volume 2: Sonata for Violin and Piano in A major, D. 574 (Op. posth. 162); Fantasy for Violin and Piano in C major, D. 934 (Op. posth. 159); Fantasy in F minor for Piano duet, D. 940 (Op. posth. 103)	Martin Helmchen (piano); Julia Fischer (first piano part, D. 940)	PENTATONE PTC 5186 348	Hybrid SACD
2010/10	Paganini: 24 Caprices for Solo Violin, Op. 1		Decca 478 2274	CD
2010/08	Saint-Saëns: Violin Concerto No. 3 in B minor, Op. 61; Grieg: Piano Concerto in A minor, Op. 16	Junge Deutsche Philharmonie; Matthias Pintscher (conductor)	Decca 074 3344	DVD-Video
2011/01	Mozart – The Violin Concertos	Julia Fischer, Gordan Nikolić, Pieter-Jan Belder, Hans Meyer, Herre-Jan Stegenga, Yakov Kreizberg (conductor), Netherlands Chamber Orchestra	PENTATONE PTC 5186453	Hybrid SACD
2011/04	Poème: Respighi Poema autunnale for violin and orchestra, P.146; Suk Fantasy for violin and orchestra in G minor, Op. 24; Chausson Poème for violin and orchestra, Op. 25; Vaughan Williams The Lark Ascending	Orchestre Philharmonique de Monte-Carlo; Yakov Kreizberg (conductor)	Decca 478 2684	CD
2012/03	In Memoriam Yakov Kreizberg. Works by Antonín Dvořák, Claude Debussy, Richard Wagner, Franz Schmidt, Johann Strauss Jr.	Netherlands Philharmonic Orchestra; Wiener Symphoniker; Russian National Orchestra.; Yakov Kreizberg (conductor)	PENTATONE PTC 5186461	Hybrid SACD
2013/03	Dvořák: Violin Concerto in A minor, Op.53; Bruch: Violin Concerto No.1 in G minor, Op.26	Tonhalle Orchester Zürich; David Zinman (conductor)	Decca 478 3544	CD
2014/02	Sarasate: Zigeunerweisen, Op. 20; Caprice Basque, Op. 24; Jota Aragonesa, Op. 27; Sérénade andalouse, Op. 28; El canto del ruiseñor, Op. 29; Danza Española No. 1: Malagueña, Op. 21, No. 1; Danza Española No. 2: Habanera, Op. 21, No. 2; Danza Española No. 3: Romanza Andaluza, Op. 22, No. 1; Danza Española No. 4: Jota Navarra, Op. 22, No. 2; Danza Española No. 5: Playera Op. 23 No. 1; Danza Española No. 6: Zapateado, Op. 23, No. 2; Danza Española No. 7: Vito, Op. 26, No. 1; Danza Española No. 8: Habanera, Op. 26, No. 2	Milana Chernyavska (piano)	Decca 478 5950	CD
2014/02	Creating Timeless Classics Works by Robert Schumann, Peter Ilyich Tchaikovsky, Johann Sebastian Bach, Ludwig van Beethoven, Howard Blake	Martin Helmchen, Arabella Steinbacher, Nareh Arghamanyan, Mari Kodama, Julia Fischer, Russian National Orchestra, Concertgebouw Chamber Orchestra, Academy of St Martin in the Fields, Orchestre de la Suisse Romande	PENTATONE PTC 5186531	Hybrid SACD
2014/10	Schubert – Complete Works for Violin and Piano (re-issue)	Julia Fischer, Martin Helmchen (piano)	PENTATONE PTC 5186519	Hybrid SACD
2015/09	Julia Fischer at the BBC Proms (21 Jul 2014): Dvořák Violin Concerto in A minor, Op.53; Hindemith Sonata for Solo Violin in G minor op. 11 no. 6: III Finale. Lebhaft	Tonhalle Orchester Zürich; David Zinman (conductor)	C Major 732104 / C Major 732008	Blu-ray / DVD-Video
2016/08	Duo Sessions: Kodály Duo for Violin and Cello, Op. 7; Schulhoff Duo for Violin and Cello; Ravel Sonata for Violin and Cello; Halvorsen Passacaglia in G minor on a Theme by George Frideric Handel	Daniel Müller-Schott (cello)	ORFEO International C 902 161 A	CD
2017	Johann Sebastian Bach: Sonatas and Partitas for Solo Violin BWV 1001–1006			
