= Marcello Viotti =

Swiss conductor (1954–2005)

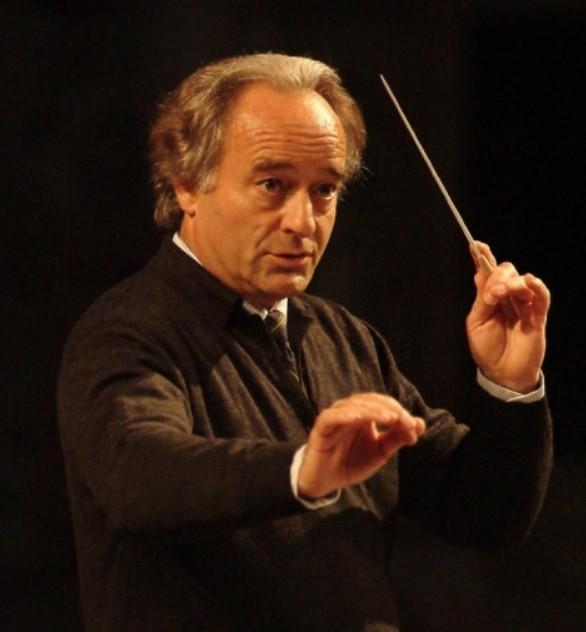
Image of Marcello Viotti

Marcello Viotti (29 June 1954 – 16 February 2005) was a Swiss classical music conductor, best known for opera.

Viotti was born in Vallorbe, in the French-speaking region of Switzerland, to Italian parents. He studied cello, piano and singing at the Conservatory of Lausanne. Wolfgang Sawallisch was a mentor to Viotti and encouraged him to begin his career in the theatre. As a young conductor, Viotti honed his craft with the International Orchestra of the Jeunesses Musicales in the Italian town of Fermo, and also with a wind ensemble. His interpretation of Robert Schumann's 4th Symphony helped him win the 1982 Gino Marinuzzi Competition.

During the 1980s and 1990s Viotti was a director at several opera houses in Europe. These included three years as artistic director of the Stadttheater in Lucerne, a post as music director of the Turin opera, and three years as Generalmusikdirektor of Bremen (1990–1993). He held guest conducting posts at the Vienna State Opera, the Deutsche Oper Berlin, and the Bavarian State Opera.

Viotti was chief conductor of the Saarland Radio Symphony Orchestra (Saarbrücken) from 1991 to 1995. He was one of three joint chief conductors of the MDR Leipzig Radio Symphony Orchestra from 1996 to 1999. Viotti was chief conductor of the Münchner Rundfunkorchester from 1998 to 2004, when he resigned in protest at budget cuts that threatened the existence of the orchestra. Viotti was named music director at the Teatro La Fenice Orchestra in Venice in January 2002. He appeared a number of times with the Melbourne Symphony Orchestra in Australia, and from 2002 until his death he was Principal Guest Conductor of the orchestra.

Viotti suffered a stroke during a rehearsal in Munich in February 2005 and underwent surgery to remove a blood clot. He was then hospitalized on artificial life support but never regained consciousness and died on 16 February 2005. Viotti was married and had four children; his son Lorenzo is a conductor. His daughter Marina Viotti is an opera singer.

== Decorations and awards ==
- 1982 1st Prize of the Gino Marinuzzi Competition (Italy)
- German Record Prize
- 2003 Austrian Cross of Honour for Science and Art

Cultural offices
Preceded by Myung-Whun Chung	Chief Conductor, Saarland Radio Symphony Orchestra; 1991–1995	Succeeded by Michael Stern
Preceded by Roberto Abbado	Chief Conductor, Münchner Rundfunkorchester; 1998–2004	Succeeded by Ulf Schirmer
