= Marc Albrecht =

German conductor (born 1964)

Marc Albrecht (born 1964) is a German conductor resident in The Netherlands. He was chief conductor of the Dutch National Opera, the Netherlands Chamber Orchestra, and the Netherlands Philharmonic Orchestra from 2009 to 2020. From the season of 2026-2027 on, he will be the chief conductor of the Antwerp Symphony Orchestra.

== Biography ==
Born in Hanover, Lower Saxony, West Germany, Albrecht is the son of the conductor George Alexander Albrecht and Corinne Albrecht, formerly a ballet dancer who became a physiotherapist. He is a first cousin of Ursula von der Leyen (née Albrecht). Albrecht studied music with his father. Albrecht has served as an assistant to Claudio Abbado with the Gustav Mahler Jugendorchester, and an assistant conductor to Gerd Albrecht (no relation) at the Hamburg State Opera.

From 1995 to 2001, Albrecht was music director of the Staatstheater Darmstadt. From 2001 to 2004, he was first guest conductor with the Deutsche Oper Berlin. He became artistic adviser of the Orchestre philharmonique de Strasbourg (Strasbourg Philharmonic Orchestra) in 2005, and music director in 2008. With the Strasbourg Philharmonic, he has conducted commercial recordings for the Pentatone label, including orchestral lieder of Alban Berg and piano concertos by Robert Schumann and Antonín Dvořák. He concluded his Strasbourg tenure in 2011.

Albrecht made his first conducting appearance at the Dutch National Opera in September 2008 with Die Frau ohne Schatten. In March 2009, he was named chief conductor of the Netherlands Chamber Orchestra, Netherlands Philharmonic Orchestra, and Dutch National Opera, effective with the 2011-2012 season. His initial contract was for four years. In May 2016, the orchestra announced the extension of Albrecht's contract through the 2019-2020 season. He stood down from all three of these chief conductorships at the end of the 2019-2020 season. He has led commercial recordings with the Netherlands Philharmonic and the Netherlands Opera for the Pentatone label.

In October 2024, Albrecht first guest-conducted the Antwerp Symphony Orchestra. In February 2025, the orchestra announced the appointment of Albrecht as its next chief conductor, effective with the 2026–2027 season. Albrecht has the title of chief conductor-designate for the 2025–2026 season.

Albrecht maintains a residence in Amsterdam. His wife is an opera singer, and the couple have a son.

== Selected discography ==
- Richard Strauss - Tone Poems. Marc Albrecht, Orchestre Philharmonique de Strasbourg. PENTATONE PTC 5186310 (2008).
- Alban Berg - Orchestral Pieces and Lieder. Christiane Iven, Marc Albrecht, Orchestre Philharmonique de Strasbourg. PENTATONE PTC 5186363 (2009).
- Schumann & Dvořák - Piano Concertos. Marc Albrecht, Martin Helmchen, Orchestre Philharmonique de Strasbourg. PENTATONE PTC 5186333 (2009).
- Dukas - L'apprenti sorcier / Ravel - Ma mère l'Oye / Koechlin - Les Bandar-log. Marc Albrecht, Orchestre Philharmonique de Strasbourg. PENTATONE PTC 5186336 (2010).
- Korngold - Symphony in F sharp, Op.40; Much Ado About nothing, Op.11. Marc Albrecht, Orchestre Philharmonique de Strasbourg. PENTATONE PTC 5186373 (2010).
- Mahler - The Song of the Earth. Marc Albrecht, Alice Coote, Burkhard Fritz, Netherlands Philharmonic Orchestra. PENTATONE PTC 5186502 (2013).
- Brahms (orch. Schoenberg) Piano Quartet, Op. 25, Schoenberg - Begleitmusik zu einer Lichtspielszene. Marc Albrecht, Netherlands Philharmonic Orchestra. PENTATONE PTC 5186398 (2015)
- Mahler - Symphony No. 4. Marc Albrecht, Elizabeth Watts, Netherlands Philharmonic Orchestra. PENTATONE PTC 5186487 (2015).
- Mahler - Song Cycles. Marc Albrecht, Alice Coote, Netherlands Philharmonic Orchestra. PENTATONE PTC 5186576 (2017).
- Richard Strauss - Burleske/Ein Heldenleben. Marc Albrecht, Denis Kozhukhin, Netherlands Philharmonic Orchestra. PENTATONE PTC 5186617 (2018).
- Zemlinsky - Die Seejungfrau. Marc Albrecht, Netherlands Philharmonic Orchestra. PENTATONE PTC 5186740 (2020).

Cultural offices
Preceded by Hans Drewanz	Generalmusikdirektor, Staatstheater Darmstadt; 1995-2001	Succeeded by Stefan Blunier
Preceded by Jan Latham-Koenig	Music Director, Strasbourg Philharmonic Orchestra; 2008-2011	Succeeded by Marko Letonja
Preceded by Yakov Kreizberg	Chief Conductor, Netherlands Chamber Orchestra; 2011-2020	Succeeded by Lorenzo Viotti
Preceded by Yakov Kreizberg	Chief Conductor, Netherlands Philharmonic Orchestra; 2011-2020	Succeeded by Lorenzo Viotti
Preceded by Ingo Metzmacher	Chief Conductor, Dutch National Opera; 2011-2020	Succeeded by Lorenzo Viotti
Preceded by Elim Chan	Chief Conductor, Antwerp Symphony Orchestra; 2026–present	Succeeded by incumbent
