= Lorenzo Viotti =

Swiss conductor (born 1990)

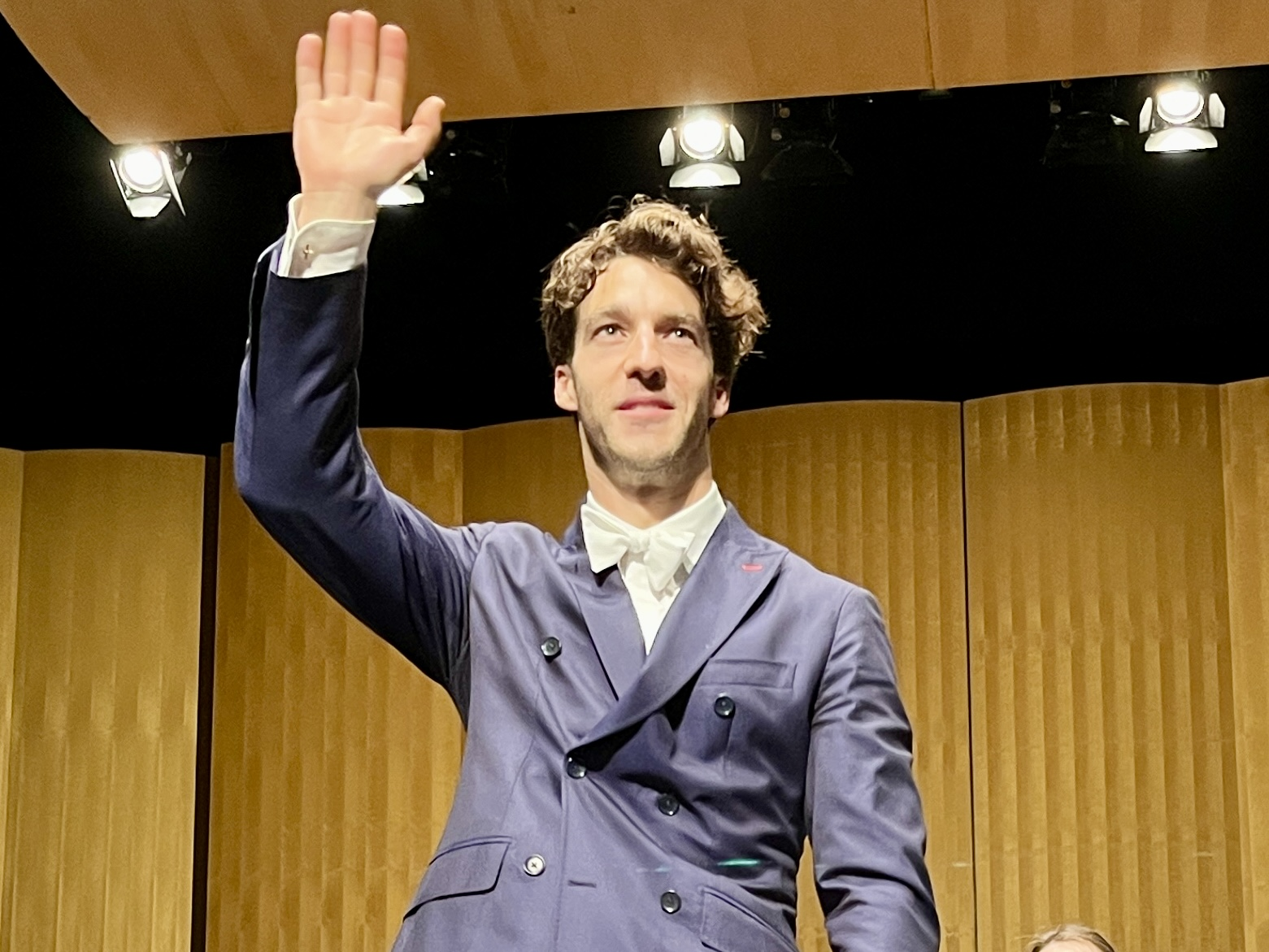
- Viotti in May 2024
- Born: 15 March 1990 (age 36); Lausanne, Switzerland
- Occupations: Percussionist; Conductor
- Organizations: Gulbenkian Orchestra; Netherlands Philharmonic Orchestra
- Parent(s): Marcello Viotti, Marie-Laurence Geneviève Jacqueline Bret
- Awards: Cadaqués Orchestra International Conducting Competition

Lorenzo Viotti (born 15 March 1990) is a Swiss conductor.

== Biography ==
The son of conductor Marcello Viotti, Viotti was born in Lausanne. He studied piano, voice and percussion in Lyon. In Vienna, he attended the conducting class of Georg Mark, and played as a percussionist with several orchestras, including the Vienna Philharmonic. He continued conducting studies at the University of Music Franz Liszt Weimar with Nicolás Pasquet, completing his studies in 2015. Growing up, he enjoyed playing funk and jazz music as a drummer, and played in his sister Marina Viotti's death metal band to have the "biggest possible musical vocabulary possible".

In 2012, Viotti was recipient of the first prize at the Cadaqués Orchestra International Conducting Competition. He made his professional conducting debut with the Tokyo Symphony Orchestra in July 2014. In 2015, he won the Nestlé and Salzburg Festival Young Conductors Awards. He won the conducting competition of the MDR Sinfonieorchester in 2016. He was chosen "Newcomer of the Year" at the 2017 International Opera Awards.

In January 2017, Viotti first guest-conducted the Gulbenkian Orchestra, and returned in the same season for a second guest-conducting appearance. In October 2017, the Gulbenkian Orchestra announced the appointment of Viotti as its next music director, effective with the 2018–2019 season, with an initial contract of three seasons. Viotti stood down as music director of the Gulbenkian Orchestra in 2021 and subsequently took the title of principal guest conductor with the orchestra.

In February 2018, Viotti first guest-conducted the Netherlands Philharmonic Orchestra (NedPhO). In April 2019, the NedPhO announced the appointment of Viotti as its next chief conductor, effective with the 2021–2022 season. With this appointment, Viotti simultaneously became chief conductor of the Netherlands Philharmonic Orchestra, the Netherlands Chamber Orchestra, and Dutch National Opera. In April 2023, Dutch National Opera and the NedPhO, announced the scheduled conclusion of Viotti's tenure at all three posts at the close of the 2024–2025 season.

In August 2024, the Tokyo Symphony Orchestra announced the appointment of Viotti as its next music director, effective with the 2026–2027 season, with an initial contract of three years. In December 2025, Zürich Opera announced the appointment of Viotti as its next Generalmusikdirektor, effective with the 2028–2029 season, with an initial contract of two seasons.

Cultural offices
Preceded by Paul McCreesh	Music Director, Gulbenkian Orchestra; 2018–2021	Succeeded by Hannu Lintu
Preceded by Marc Albrecht	Chief Conductor, Netherlands Philharmonic Orchestra; 2021–2025	Succeeded by (post vacant)
Preceded by Marc Albrecht	Chief Conductor, Netherlands Chamber Orchestra; 2021–2025	Succeeded by (post vacant)
Preceded by Marc Albrecht	Chief Conductor, Dutch National Opera; 2021–2025	Succeeded by (post vacant)
