= Alice Coote =

British mezzo-soprano

Alice Coote CBE
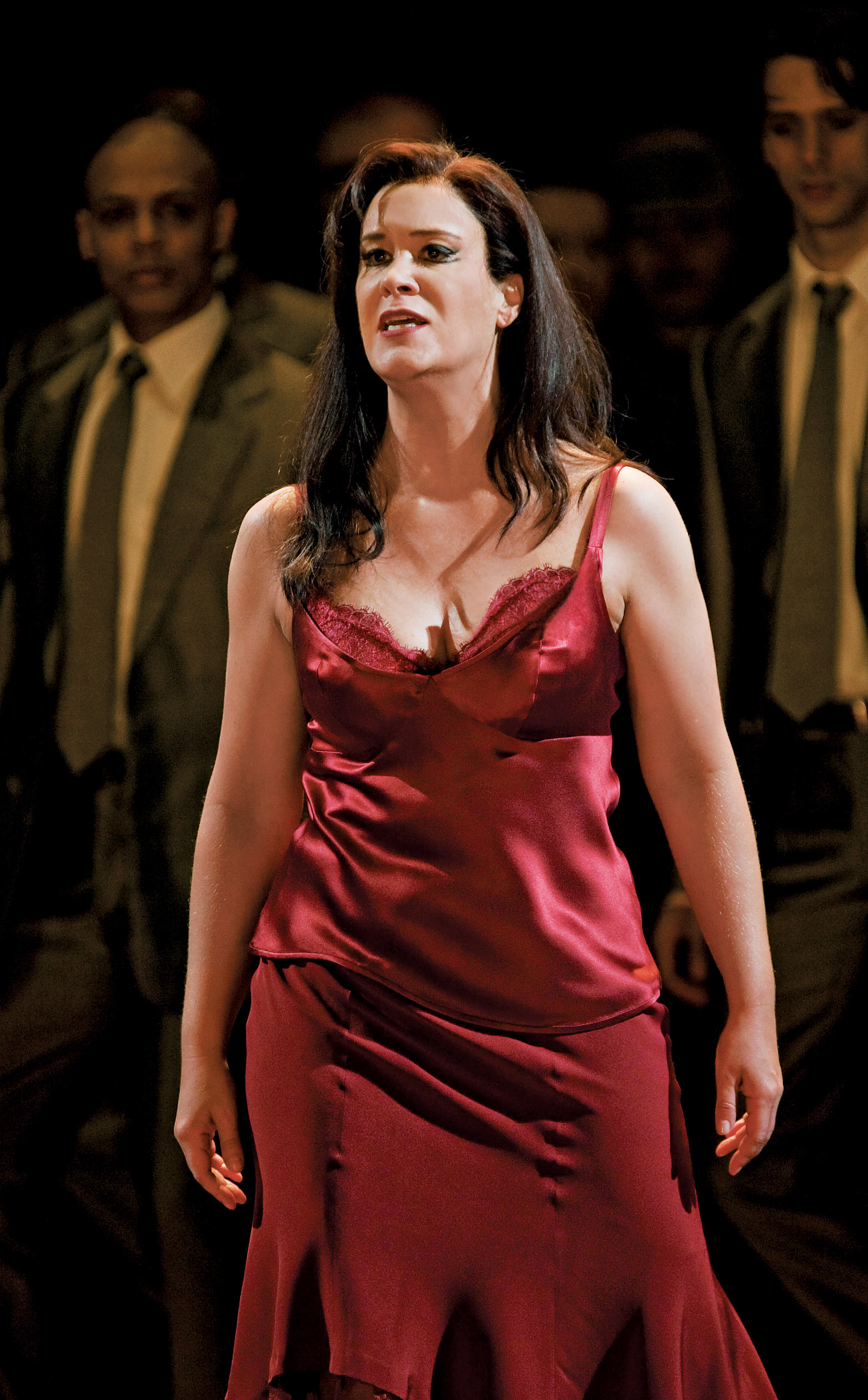
- Alice Coote in Carmen in 2007, ENO

Background information
- Born: 10 May 1968 (age 57); Frodsham, Cheshire
- Education: Guildhall School of Music and Drama; Royal Northern College of Music
- Genres: Opera
- Occupation: Musician
- Instrument: Singer
- Labels: Hyperion; EMI Classics; Virgin Classics; PTC; Harmonia Mundi; Naxos

Alice Mary Coote CBE (born 10 May 1968) is a British mezzo-soprano. Known internationally for her performances in opera playing both female and male roles, and her recitals with piano and concerts with orchestra, Coote has performed extensively across Europe, North America and Asia. Her repertoire ranges from early and baroque music to contemporary works, and includes works which have been especially written for her. She was appointed OBE in the 2018 Birthday honours for services to music.

== Life ==
Coote was born in Frodsham, Cheshire, the daughter of the painter Mark Coote. She was educated at the Guildhall School of Music and Drama in London (though she did not complete her course), the Royal Northern College of Music in Manchester (where she came into contact with Janet Baker and Brigitte Fassbaender) and the National Opera Studio during 1995/96. Coote was a BBC Radio 3 New Generation Artist from 2001 until 2003. She sings both operatic roles, particularly trouser roles, and recital repertoire, often with pianist Julius Drake.

An interpreter of Handel she has also performed contemporary pieces such as Dominick Argento's From the Diary of Virginia Woolf, a partly atonal work first performed by Janet Baker, who influenced Coote. Judith Weir has written a song cycle, The Voice of Desire, especially for her; it was premiered at a BBC Chamber Prom.

Coote has performed at England's Opera North, the English National Opera, the Metropolitan Opera in New York (Hansel in Humperdinck's Hansel and Gretel), the San Francisco Opera in 2002 (Ruggiero in Handel's Alcina) and 2008 (Idamante in Mozart's Idomeneo). In 2009, she appeared as Maffio Orsini in Donizetti's Lucrezia Borgia at the Bavarian State Opera. She also performed in 2011 as Prince Charming in Massenet's Cendrillon at the Royal Opera House. In 2013, she played Sextus in the Metropolitan Opera's production of Handel's Giulio Cesare. In March 2017 she reprised the role of Idamante in six performances at the Metropolitan Opera.

== Recordings ==
- 2002: The Choice of Hercules (Handel) – Susan Gritton, Alice Coote, Robin Blaze; The King's Consort – Robert King; Hyperion CDA67298
- 2003: Lieder – (Mahler, Haydn, Schumann) – Alice Coote, Julius Drake (piano); EMI Classics 7243 5 85559 2 9
- 2010: Symphony No. 2 Resurrection (Mahler) – Alice Coote, Natalie Dessay; Frankfurt Radio Symphony and Orfeón Donostiarra – Paavo Järvi; Virgin Classics 50999 694586 0 6
- 2013: Das Lied von der Erde (Mahler) – Alice Coote, Burkhard Fritz (tenor); Netherlands Philharmonic Orchestra – Marc Albrecht; Pentatone PTC 5186502
- 2014: Handel Arias – Alice Coote; The English Concert – Harry Bicket; Hyperion
- 2014: Die Winterreise (Schubert) – Alice Coote, Julius Drake (piano); Harmonia Mundi
- 2015: L'heure exquise – A French Songbook (Poulenc, Hahn, Gounod, Chausson) – Alice Coote, Graham Johnson (piano); Hyperion
- 2016: Sea Pictures (Elgar) – Alice Coote; Hallé Orchestra – Mark Elder; Naxos
- 2016: Schumann Lieder (incl. Frauenliebe und -leben, Dichterliebe) – Alice Coote, Christian Blackshaw (piano); Harmonia Mundi
- 2017: Mahler Song Cycles (Mahler) – Marc Albrecht, Alice Coote, Netherlands Philharmonic Orchestra; PENTATONE PTC 5186576
- 2022: 21 Schubert Songs - Alice Coote, Julius Drake (piano); Hyperion
