= BandArt Orchestra =

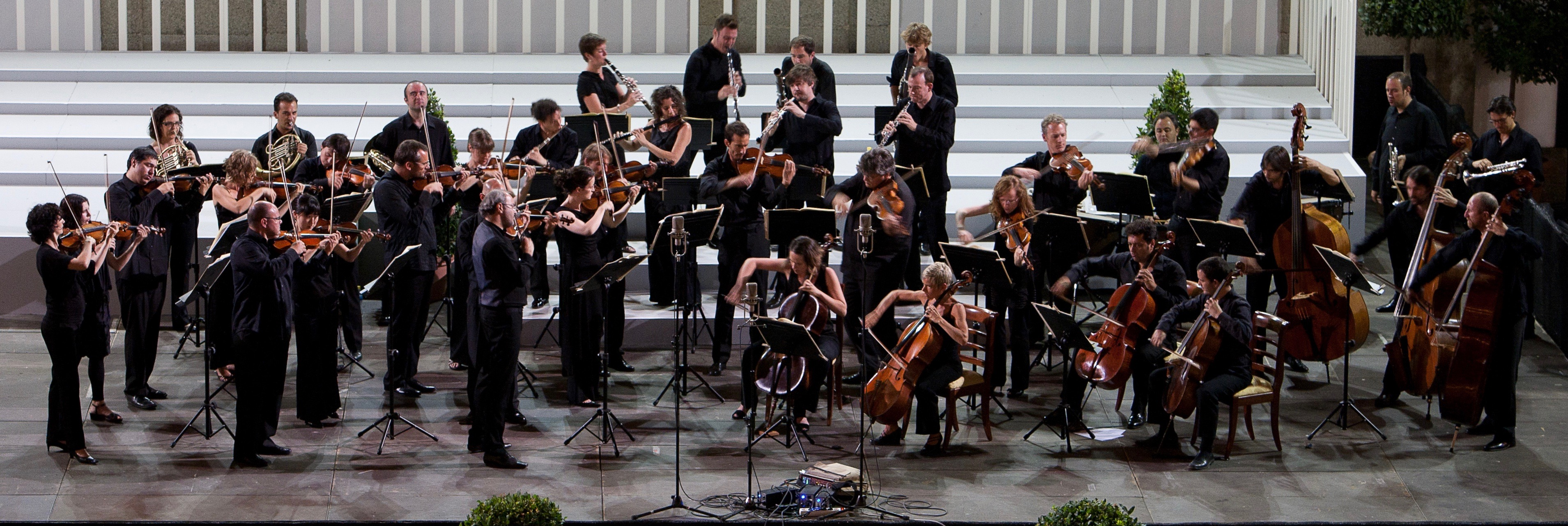
- BandArt Orchestra at El Escorial. Música al atardecer of Patrimonio Nacional 2010
- Native name: Orquesta BandArt
- Founded: 2005
- Location: Spain
- Principal conductor: Gordan Nikolić

BandArt is an independent Spanish orchestra made up of musicians from more than a dozen countries. Its artistic director is Gordan Nikolić, concertmaster of the London Symphony Orchestra.

== History ==
BandArt was founded in 2005 within Spanish festival of Lucena Cordoba. It is an independent orchestra formed by musicians of whom many are members of some of the most prestigious orchestras in Europe. The Serbian Gordan Nikolić, soloist and concertmaster of the London Symphony Orchestra and artistic director of the Netherlands Chamber Orchestra, is the art director and soul of BandArt.

The name “BandArt” was chosen because it captures perfectly the orchestra’s talent and aspirations. 'Band' comes from the Spanish word bandas, traditional wind ensembles, still strongly alive in many localities in Spain where local people of all generations meet regularly to socialize and play music of all styles, from zarzuela to Bizet, driven by a folkloristic, popular enthusiasm. 'Art', where the musical language and musician’s instincts are exposed to far more complex forms which call in their interpretation for much more elaborated nuances and deeper interdependence of all its elements. BandArt's aim is to explore the possibilities of strengthening the links of those two worlds, the local and the universal, on the platform of great composer’s music.

BandArt has performed in the most prestigious festivals and concert series in Spain, including the Ciclo de Ibermusica, Ciclo Palau 100 (Palau de la Música Catalana) conducted by Sir Colin Davis, Ciclo Sinfónico de la Fundación Caja Madrid, Peralada Festival performing Orfeo ed Euridice by Gluck with La Fura dels Baus, (DVD recording for Cmajor Label), Artes no Camino festival and El Escorial Festival, with the support of Patrimonio Nacional. They have also performed in the Palau de la Música de València and in the Auditorio Nacional de Música, Madrid. In July 2016 BandArt performed Mozart´s Idomeneo at the Ludwigsburger Schlossfestspiele in a production by the Ludwigsburg Festival and the refugees’ German association Zuflucht Kultur e.V.

== Special characteristics ==
BandArt is an orchestra without the conductor's usual figure on the stage, so it requires a deep interaction and hard team work by its members. They keep a special attention and that’s when “with side by side work upper bounds are achieved". This leads to play on numerous occasions standing up, generating a feel and energy close to rock and roll and establishing strong emotional bonds with the public. This can be appreciated by attending any of their concerts and also in the documentary BandArt, filmed by Iván Valdés. It has been said that BandArt "is an example of the rejuvenation of classical music in its symphonic version and develops another way of playing".

== Recordings ==
Several BandArt interpretation had been recorded:

Orfeo ed Euridice by Gluck had been performed by BandArt and La Fura dels Baus at Castell de Peralada’s Festival in 2011. It was recorded by Unitel Classical, available in DVD and also on YouTube.

Ludwig van Beethoven's Piano Concert No. 4 in G major, BandArt Orchestra with Javier Perianes, piano; Gordan Nikolic, concertmaster; were recorded at the National Auditorium of Music in Madrid for Los clásicos the TV program of classical music on RTVE in 2008.

Ludwig van Beethoven's Symphony No. 7 in A major, Op. 92, BandArt Orchestra; Gordan Nikolic, concertmaster; were recorded at the National Auditorium of Music in Madrid for Los clásicos in February 2008.

The documentary BandArt by Iván Valdés shows how the orchestra works.

== Social activities ==
Social integration through the arts is a vital part of their activities. Due to this social vocation, from its foundation to the present, members of the ensemble have taken part in a number of activities with refugees, in prisons, retirement homes, disability associations, schools (working especially with children with risk of social exclusion) and hospitals. In order to develop these projects, BandArt has been supported by Teatro Real, Fundación Don Juan de Borbón, Fundación ONCE, Patrimonio Nacional and Zuflucht Kultur, within others.
