= Milana Chernyavska =

Ukrainian-German classical pianist

- Born: January 13, 1968 (age 57); Kyiv, Ukraine
- Education: Tchaikovsky Conservatory; Musikhochschule München
- Occupations: Classical pianist; Academic
- Organizations: Musikakademie Liechtenstein; University of Music and Performing Arts Graz; Reina Sofía School of Music
- Awards: Lysenko Music Competition

Milana Chernyavska (Ukrainian: Мілана Чернявська; born 13 January 1968) is a Ukrainian-German classical pianist born and educated in Ukraine. She has played internationally as a soloist and chamber musician, with a focus on contemporary music which she also recorded.

== Life and career ==
Born in Kyiv, Chernyavska began playing piano at age five. Two years later, she began studies at the Tchaikovsky Conservatory there in a class for gifted children. After studies with Valery Sagaidachny, she graduated in 1990. She studied further in masterclasses with Dmitri Bashkirov and Boris Bloch, among others, and at the University of Music and Performing Arts Munich with Margarita Höhenrieder and Gerhard Oppitz.

Chernyavska has appeared internationally, at festivals including the Lucerne Festival, Schwetzingen Festival, Rheingau Musik Festival and Schleswig-Holstein Musik Festival. She has played at Wigmore Hall in London, the Concertgebouw in Amsterdam, the Munich's Herkulessaal, the St. Petersburg Philharmonic Hall, and the Suntory Hall in Tokyo. As a chamber musician, she has performed with Julia Fischer, Daniel Müller-Schott, and the Vogler Quartet, among others.

In 2013, she recorded music for violin and piano by Nikolai Rakov, including three sonatas, with David Frühwirth. It was the first recording of these pieces. Barry Brenesal noted in Fanfare about this only recording of the music: "Chernyavska is a full partner in the proceedings, delicate and brutal as required, the pair playing together with familiar ease."

She has been a professor at the Musikakademie Liechtenstein, and lectured at music universities. She has been a professor of piano at the University of Music and Performing Arts Graz.. She is currently a professor of the Fundación Banco Santander Piano Chair at the Reina Sofía School of Music.

== Awards ==
Chernyavska achieved prizes at national and international competitions, such as first prize at the Mykola Lysenko International Music Competition in Kyiv in 1998, a Gold Medal at the Vladimir and Regina Horowitz Competition, first prize at the International Piano Competition "Pierre Lantier" in Paris in 1994, and third prize at the international chamber music competition Vittorio Gui Prize in Florence.
