= Gerhard Oppitz =

German classical pianist (born 1953)

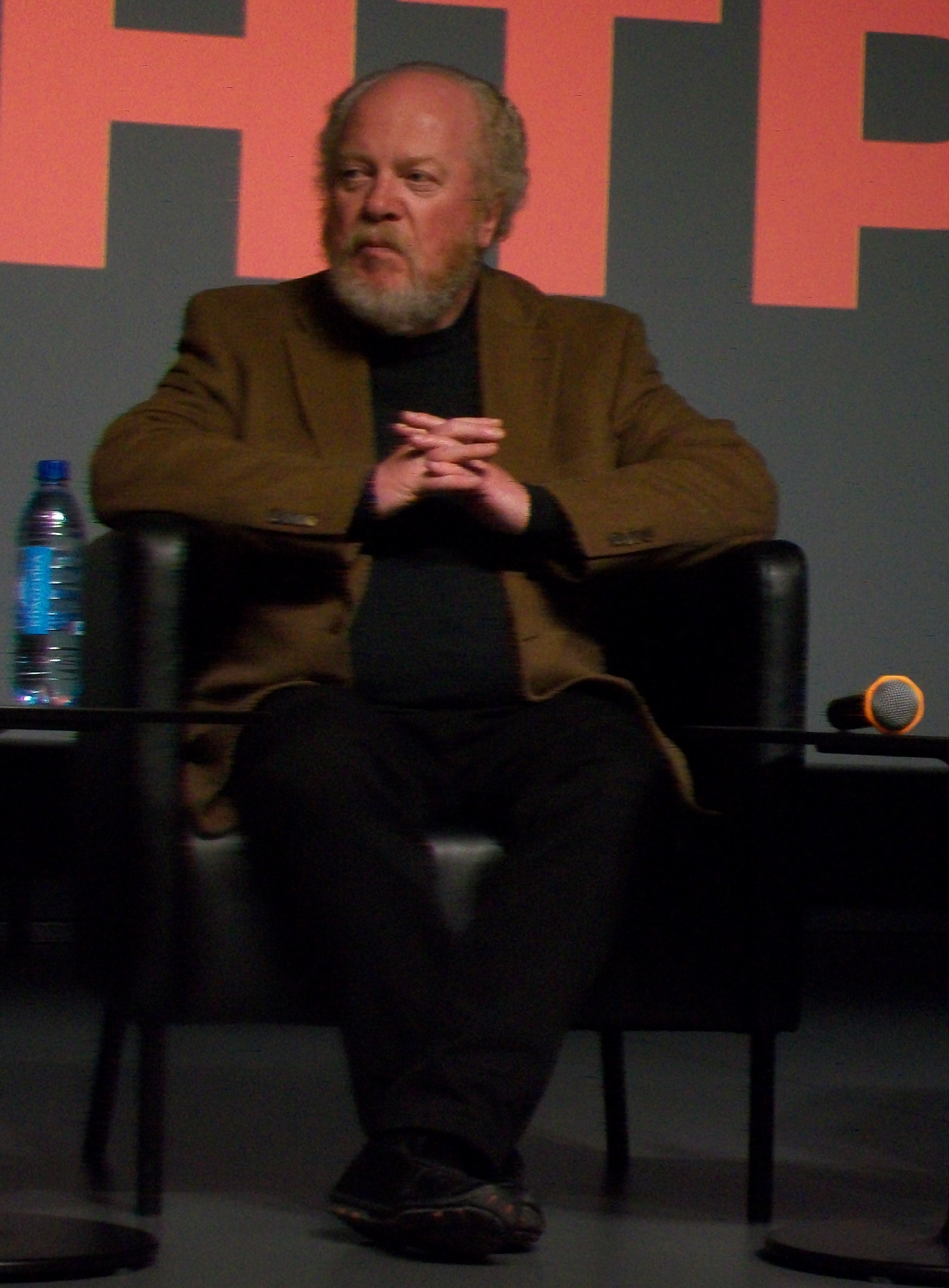
Gerhard Oppitz at the Yeltsin Center in 2017

Gerhard Oppitz (born 5 February 1953, Frauenau) is a German classical pianist.

He studied with Paul Buck, Hugo Steurer and Wilhelm Kempff. In 1981 he was appointed professor at the Hochschule für Musik und Theater München – the youngest in the history of the institute – where he still teaches. As a soloist he has appeared with many famous conductors and orchestras of the world. In the summer 1977, at the age of 24, Oppitz was the first German to win the Arthur Rubinstein International Piano Master Competition in Tel Aviv, Israel.

Performance of cycles of complete piano works feature strongly in his concert repertoire, including Schubert's and Grieg's solo piano works and the sonatas by Beethoven and Mozart's sonatas and, especially, the complete works of Johannes Brahms. He has recorded the challenging Max Reger Piano Concerto, Op. 114, with the Bamberg Symphony Orchestra and conductor Horst Stein.

In 2009 he received the Brahms-Preis from the Brahms Society of Schleswig-Holstein.

Among his students are Valentina Babor and Milana Chernyavska.
