= Szymon Goldberg =

Polish-born violinist and conductor (1909–1993)

Szymon Goldberg (1 June 1909 – 19 July 1993) was a Polish-born Jewish classical violinist and conductor, latterly an American.

Born in Włocławek, Congress Poland, Goldberg played the violin as a child growing up in Warsaw. His first teacher was Henryk Czaplinski, a student of the great Czech violinist Otakar Ševčík; his second was Mieczysław Michałowicz, a student of Leopold Auer. In 1917, at age eight, Goldberg moved to Berlin to study the violin with the legendary pedagogue Carl Flesch. He was also a student of Josef Wolfsthal.

After a recital in Warsaw in 1921, and a debut with the Berlin Philharmonic in 1924 in which he played three concertos, he was engaged as concert-master of the Dresden Philharmonic from 1925 to 1929. In 1929 he was offered the position of concertmaster of the Berlin Philharmonic by its principal conductor, Wilhelm Furtwängler. He accepted the position, serving from 1930 to 1934. During these years, he also performed in a string trio with Paul Hindemith on viola and Emanuel Feuermann on cello, and also led a string quartet of Berlin Philharmonic members.

The rise of the Third Reich forced Goldberg to leave the orchestra in 1934, despite Furtwängler's attempts to safeguard the Jewish members of the orchestra. Thereafter, he toured Europe with the pianist Lili Kraus. He made his American debut in New York in 1938 at Carnegie Hall. While in the former Netherlands East Indies he formed the Goldberg Quartet, together with Robert Pikler on viola, Louis Mojzer on cello and Eugenie Emerson, piano. Pikler and Mojzer were Hungarians and Emerson was American. This Piano Quartet toured the major cities in Java, before the Japanese invasion and occupation. Goldberg's first wife was a skilled artist and sculptor. She was interned by the Japanese in the Tjihapit Women's Camp in Bandung, together with Mojzer's family, while Goldberg and Kraus were on a tour of Asia.

He toured Australia for three months in 1946. Eventually he went to the United States and became a naturalised American citizen in 1953. From 1951 to 1965 he taught at the Aspen Music School. Concurrently he was active as a conductor. In 1955 he founded the Netherlands Chamber Orchestra in Amsterdam, which he led until 1979. He also took the ensemble on many tours. From the years 1977 to 1979 he was the conductor of the Manchester Camerata.

He taught at Yale University from 1978 to 1982, the Juilliard School in New York City from 1978 to 1989, the Curtis Institute of Music in Philadelphia from 1980 to 1981, and the Manhattan School of Music in New York starting in 1981. From 1990 until his death, he conducted the New Japan Philharmonic in Tokyo.

His first wife died in the 1980s after a long illness. In 1988, he married his second wife, Japanese pianist Miyoko Yamane (1938–2006), a former student of Rudolf Serkin and Rudolf Kolisch; they resided primarily in Philadelphia (with annual visits to Japan) until 1992, when they moved to Toyama, Japan. He died in Toyama in 1993, aged 84.

He made a number of recordings, most notably a celebrated series of Mozart and Beethoven sonatas with Lili Kraus before World War II, the three Brahms Sonatas with Artur Balsam (Brunswick AXTL 1082), and Mozart and Schubert pieces with Radu Lupu (with whom he performed as a duo in concert) in the 1970s. The Berlin Philharmonic, in a 2014 tribute to their former concertmaster, wrote that in the music of Bach and Mozart, Goldberg "brought a poise and a beauty of tone that seemed like perfection. Indeed he was the finest Mozart violinist of his time, with the feline grace essential for the violin sonatas, the concertos and the Sinfonia concertante."

He owned and played the "Baron Vitta" Giuseppe Guarneri (Guarneri del Gesù) violin; after his death his widow gave it to the Library of Congress.

Cultural offices
Preceded by no predecessor	Principal Conductor, Netherlands Chamber Orchestra; 1979–1986	Succeeded by Antoni Ros-Marbà
