= Dutch National Opera =

Dutch opera company

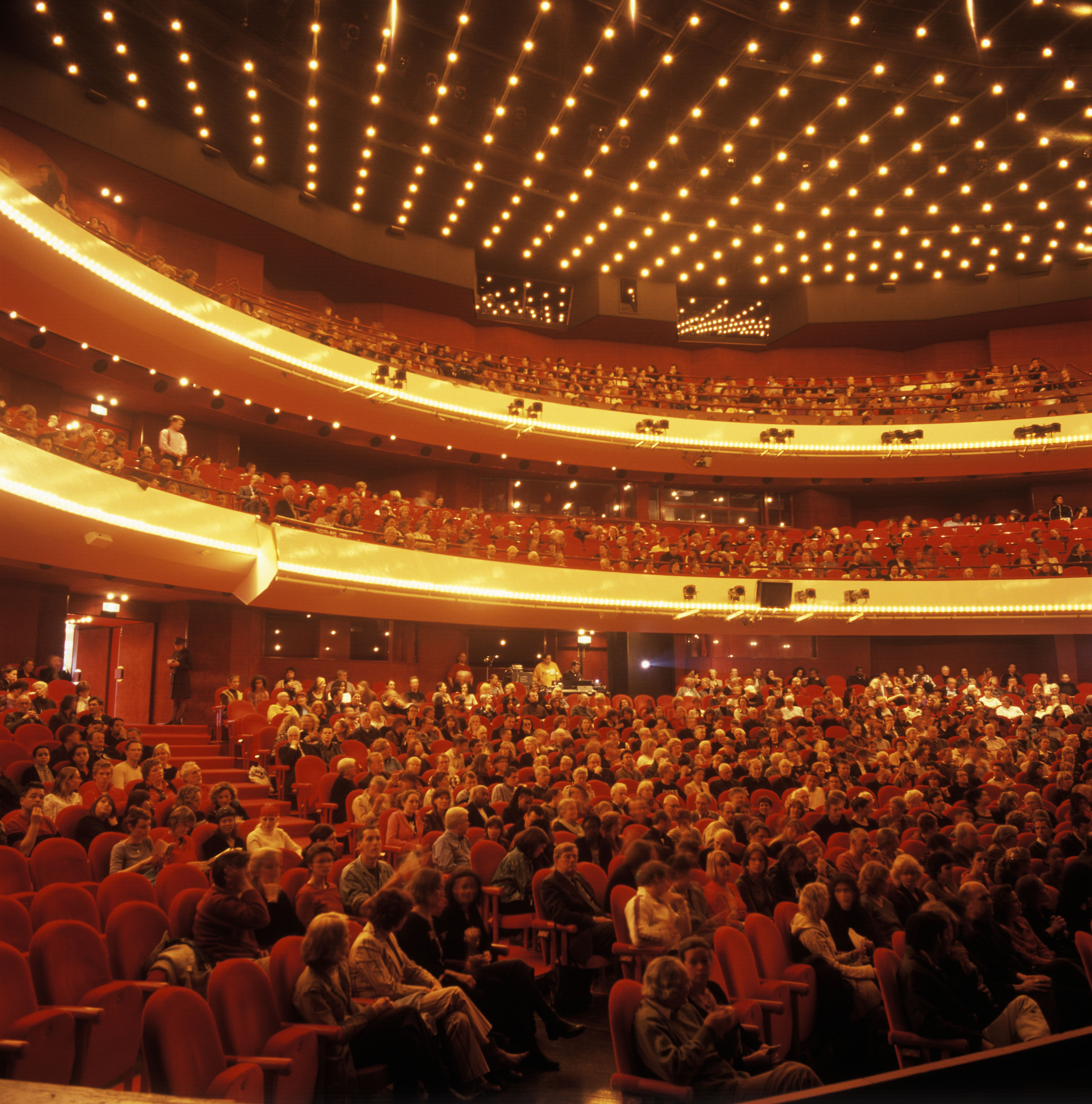
Het Muziektheater in Amsterdam's Stopera, home of the DNO

The Dutch National Opera (DNO; formerly De Nederlandse Opera, now De Nationale Opera in Dutch) is a Dutch opera company based in Amsterdam, Netherlands. Its present home base is the Dutch National Opera & Ballet housed in the Stopera building, a modern building designed by Cees Dam and Wilhelm Holzbauer that opened in 1986.

It received the "Opera Company of the Year" award at the 2016 International Opera Awards.

== History ==
The DNO was established shortly after the end of World War II as a repertory company with a permanent ensemble. In the postwar period, it toured extensively in the Netherlands from its home base in the Stadsschouwburg, a fin de siècle theatre on the Leidseplein in Amsterdam. In 1964, it was renamed De Nederlandse Operastichting (The Dutch Opera Foundation), and the company adopted a stagione orientation, inviting different soloists and artistic teams for each new production. In 1986, the company moved to the new Stopera building, which it shares with the Dutch National Ballet, and thereafter became known as De Nederlandse Opera (DNO). In 2014, the company changed its name to De Nationale Opera (Dutch National Opera).

The DNO has its own choir of sixty singers and a technical staff of 260. The DNO historically has not had its own resident orchestra, and so various orchestras of the Netherlands, including the Netherlands Philharmonic Orchestra (NPO), the Netherlands Chamber Orchestra (NKO), the Royal Concertgebouw Orchestra, the Rotterdam Philharmonic Orchestra, the Radio Filharmonisch Orkest, Residentie Orkest, Den Haag (The Hague Philharmonic), and the Asko|Schönberg ensemble have provided the orchestral forces for DNO productions.

The DNO produces on average eleven productions per year. While most performances are in the Dutch National Opera & Ballet building, the company has also performed in the Stadsschouwburg, at the Carré Theatre, and on the Westergasfabriek industrial site in Amsterdam. For many years, the June production has been organized as part of the Holland Festival and includes the participation of the Royal Concertgebouw Orchestra. The DNO has lent its productions to foreign companies, such as the Metropolitan Opera, the Brooklyn Academy of Music, and the Lincoln Center Festival in New York, as well as the Adelaide Festival in Australia.

Pierre Audi was artistic director of the DNO from 1998 to 2018. In April 2017, the DNO announced the appointment of Sophie de Lint as the company's next artistic director, effective 1 September 2018.

Hartmut Haenchen was chief conductor from 1986 to 1999, in parallel with holding the title of chief conductor of the NPO. He subsequently held the title of principal guest conductor with the DNO. Subsequent chief conductors have been Edo de Waart (1999–2004) and Ingo Metzmacher (2005–2008). In March 2009, the DNO announced the appointment of Marc Albrecht as the orchestra's next chief conductor, with the 2011–2012 season, for an initial contract of four years. This return to a single chief conductor at both the DNO and the NedPhO/NKO allows for the NedPhO to become the principal opera orchestra for the DNO. Albrecht stood down as chief conductor of the DNO at the end of the 2019–2020 season.

In April 2019, the DNO announced the appointment of Lorenzo Viotti as its next chief conductor, effective with the 2021–2022 season. In April 2023, the DNO announced the scheduled conclusion of Viotti's tenure as its chief conductor at the close of the 2024–2025 season.

== Chief conductors (partial list) ==
- Hans Vonk (1976–1985)
- Hartmut Haenchen (1986–1999)
- Edo de Waart (1999–2004)
- Ingo Metzmacher (2005–2008)
- Marc Albrecht (2011–2020)
- Lorenzo Viotti (2021–2025)
