= Netherlands Philharmonic Orchestra =

Dutch symphony orchestra

The Netherlands Philharmonic (Dutch: Nederlands Philharmonisch) is a Dutch symphony orchestra based in Amsterdam.

== History ==
The Netherlands Philharmonic was formed as the Netherlands Philharmonic Orchestra in 1985 from the merger of three orchestras: the Amsterdam Philharmonic Orchestra, the Utrecht Symphony Orchestra Utrecht and the Netherlands Chamber Orchestra. The Netherlands Chamber Orchestra (Dutch: Nederlands Kamer Orkest, NKO) continues to give concerts under its own name, with both it and the NedPhO as part of the Netherlands Philharmonic Orchestra Foundation (Stichting Nederlands Philharmonisch Orkest), which is headquartered in Amsterdam. The NedPhO Foundation comprises the largest orchestra organisation in the Netherlands, with 130 musicians on staff.

Since 2012, both the Netherlands Philharmonic and the NKO rehearse at the NedPho Koepel, a former church converted into a dedicated rehearsal space in eastern Amsterdam. The orchestra gives concerts in Amsterdam at the Concertgebouw. In addition, the Netherlands Philharmonic currently serves as the principal orchestra for productions at Dutch National Opera (DNO). The orchestra had given a concert series at the Beurs van Berlage until 2002, when budget cuts led to the end of that series. Since 2005-2006, the orchestra has also given a series of concerts at the Muziekcentrum Vredenburg in Utrecht.

The chief conductor of the Netherlands Philharmonic also serves as chief conductor of the NKO. Hartmut Haenchen was the first chief conductor of the Netherlands Philharmonic, from 1985 to 2002. He continues to work with the orchestra as a guest conductor. Yakov Kreizberg succeeded Haenchen as chief conductor of the Netherlands Philharmonic and the NKO in 2003, holding both posts until his death in March 2011, the year that he had been scheduled to step down from both posts. In March 2009, the orchestra announced the appointment of Marc Albrecht as its third chief conductor, effective with the 2011-2012 season, for an initial contract of 4 years. With Albrecht's parallel appointment as chief conductor of DNO, this arrangement allows for the Netherlands Philharmonic to serve as the principal opera orchestra for DNO. In May 2016, the orchestra announced the extension of Albrecht's contract through the 2019-2020 season. Albrecht concluded his tenure with the Netherlands Philharmonic and the NKO at the close of the 2019-2020 season.

In February 2018, Lorenzo Viotti first guest-conducted the orchestra. In April 2019, the orchestra announced the appointment of Viotti as its next chief conductor, effective with the 2020-2021 season. In April 2023, the orchestra announced the scheduled conclusion of Viotti's tenure as its chief conductor at the close of the 2024-2025 season. In February 2025, the orchestra announced its renaming from the Nederlands Philharmonisch Orkest to the Nederlands Philharmonisch, with a parallel re-branding of the organisation to the collective name Nederlands Philharmonisch & Nederlands Kamerorkest.

The Netherlands Philharmonic Orchestra has made a number of recordings for Pentatone, ICA Classics, Tacet, Brilliant Classics and others.

== Chief conductors ==
- Hartmut Haenchen (1985–2002)
- Yakov Kreizberg (2003–2011)
- Marc Albrecht (2011–2020)
- Lorenzo Viotti (2021–2025)

== Selected discography ==
- Gustav Mahler - Symphony No. 5; Hartmut Haenchen, conductor. PENTATONE PTC 5186004 (2002).
- Antonín Dvořák - New World Symphony & Tchaikovsky - Romeo and Juliet; Yakov Kreizberg, conductor. PENTATONE PTC 5186019 (2003).
- Franz Schmidt - Symphony No. 4 & Orchestral music from Notre Dame; Yakov Kreizberg, conductor. PENTATONE PTC 5186015 (2003).
- Richard Wagner - Preludes & Overtures; Yakov Kreizberg, conductor. PENTATONE PTC 5186041 (2004).
- Johannes Brahms - Violin Concerto & Double Concerto for Violin and Cello. Julia Fischer, Daniel Müller-Schott; Yakov Kreizberg, conductor. PENTATONE PTC 5186066 (2007).
- Antonín Dvořák - Symphony No. 8; Holoubek, Op. 110; Polednice, Op. 108. Yakov Kreizberg, conductor. PENTATONE PTC 5186065 (2007).
- Tour de France musicale. - Works by Maurice Ravel, Gabriel Fauré, Claude Debussy; Yakov Kreizberg, conductor. PENTATONE PTC 5186058 (2005).
- Richard Wagner - Preludes & Overtures; Yakov Kreizberg, conductor. PENTATONE PTC 5186041 (2004).
- In Memoriam Yakov Kreizberg. Works by Antonín Dvořák, Claude Debussy, Richard Wagner, Franz Schmidt, Johann Strauss Jr.; Julia Fischer, Yakov Kreizberg, conductor; Wiener Symphoniker, Russian National Orchestra. PENTATONE PTC 5186461 (2012).
- Gustav Mahler - Das Lied von der Erde. Alice Coote, Burkhard Fritz; Marc Albrecht, conductor. PENTATONE PTC 5186502 (2013).
- Mahler Song Cycles. Alice Coote; Marc Albrecht, conductor. PENTATONE PTC 5186576 (2017).
- Johannes Brahms - Piano Quartet Op. 25 (arr. Arnold Schoenberg) & Arnold Schoenberg - Begleitungsmusik zu einer Lichtspielscene. Marc Albrecht, conductor. PENTATONE PTC 5186398 (2015).
- Gustav Mahler - Symphony No. 4. Elizabeth Watts; Marc Albrecht, conductor. PENTATONE PTC 5186487 (2015).
- Richard Strauss - Burleske / Ein Heldenleben. Denis Kozhukhin; Marc Albrecht, conductor. PENTATONE PTC 5186617 (2018).
- Zemlinsky - Die Seejungfrau. Marc Albrecht, Netherlands Philharmonic Orchestra. PENTATONE PTC 5186740 (2020).
