= Yakov Kreizberg =

Russian-born American conductor (1959–2011)

Yakov Kreizberg (Russian: Яков Крейцберг; born Yakov Mayevich Bychkov, 24 October 1959 – 15 March 2011) was a Russian-born American conductor.

== Early years ==
=== In the Soviet Union ===
Yakov Bychkov was born in Leningrad into a family of Jewish ancestry. His father, May Bychkov, was a doctor and military scientist. His maternal great-grandfather, Yakov Kreizberg, was a conductor at the Odessa Opera. His brother is Semyon Bychkov (born in 1952).

Yakov began studying piano at age 5. He attended the Glinka Choir School, where he began composing at age 13. He subsequently studied conducting with Ilya Musin, as did his brother. In later years, Kreizberg summarised his conducting education as follows:

What Musin taught was a foundation; everything else I learned from master classes of very good and bad conductors. From the bad, I learned what not to do.

Semyon had emigrated from the Soviet Union in 1975. Yakov had also hoped to emigrate, but his father's professional status and perceived security risk were barriers to emigration. His emigration became possible only when his father chose to divorce his mother, which permitted mother and son to leave the country. By that time, he had composed numerous works, all unpublished, in manuscript. The Soviet authorities, however, did not allow any handwritten material to be taken out of the country, so he had to leave his compositions behind. The experience was such that he gave up composition and decided to become a conductor, although he also stated later that he "realised I didn't have enough talent for it".

=== In the United States ===
Following his emigration to the United States with his mother in 1976, Yakov Bychkov attended the Mannes School of Music, as did his brother, who counted among his conducting teachers, and graduated in 1981. One of his first public appearances as conductor was on 30 March 1980 at the Marble Collegiate Church, leading Haydn's Symphony No. 88. For his graduation concert, he conducted the Mannes Orchestra on 6 March 1981. Around this time, he changed his surname to his mother's maiden name, Kreizberg, to distinguish himself from his older brother.

On the advice of Seiji Ozawa, Kreizberg moved to the University of Michigan to do his graduate studies in conducting, where his teachers included Gustav Meier. He took US citizenship in 1982. He became the first student there to earn a doctorate in both orchestral and operatic conducting, and won the school's Eugene Ormandy Prize. While at the University of Michigan, Kreizberg conducted the Livonia Youth Symphony's senior orchestra from 1983 to 1984, with performances in Livonia, Michigan, as well as at Orchestra Hall in Detroit.

Kreizberg spent summers at Tanglewood continuing his conducting studies with Erich Leinsdorf, Ozawa, and Leonard Bernstein. He received a scholarship at the Los Angeles Philharmonic Institute, where he continued work with Bernstein and was invited back to be assistant to Michael Tilson Thomas. Later in his career, in 2006, Kreizberg acknowledged Bernstein as the conductor whom he most admired:

The conductor I most admire and respect is Leonard Bernstein. He had a phenomenal musical talent. Not only was he a great conductor but also a wonderful composer, fabulous pianist, and a powerful educator of young audiences. One could agree or disagree with his approach to a particular score but ultimately he was so unbelievably passionate about music, and so convincing in his reading of the piece, that one couldn't help but feel that his way of interpreting it was the only right way. He even made works that, generally speaking, were not considered the most important seem like masterpieces.

From 1985 to 1988, Kreizberg was director of the orchestra at Mannes, and also taught conducting to a select number of students. During this period, he also conducted concerts of the New York City Symphony. In 1986, Kreizberg won first prize in the American Symphony Orchestra's Stokowski Conducting Competition, which resulted in a 2 March 1986 concert at Carnegie Hall, subsequently repeated the following week (9 March) at Newark Symphony Hall.

Kreizberg also worked as an accompanist to vocal students and accompanied productions such as Theatre Opera Music Institute's 1981 production of Rimsky-Korsakov's Mozart and Salieri. He accompanied and toured with Roberta Peters in the late 1980s.

== Professional career ==
=== Opera ===
Kreizberg was general music director (GMD) of the United Municipal Theaters of Krefeld and Mönchengladbach from 1988 to 1994, where his work included a notable revival of Aribert Reimann's opera-oratorio Troades, which the composer himself received enthusiastically. At the time of his 1986 appointment to the post, he was age 27, the youngest GMD ever appointed in Germany up to that time.

Kreizberg later was GMD of the Komische Oper Berlin from 1994 to 2001. During his tenure there, he conducted 10 new opera productions and 38 orchestral concerts, as well as 2 ballets. In particular, in 1994, Kreizberg conducted Berthold Goldschmidt's Der gewaltige Hanrei in its first staging since 1932. Other work there in contemporary opera included a production of Hans Werner Henze's König Hirsch. For his work at the Komische Oper, he received the Kritikerpreis für Musik in 1997 by the Verband der deutschen Kritiker e.V., the German music critics association. Kreizberg noted difficulties with funding, job cuts, and inability to fill vacancies as factors in his departure from the Komische Oper Berlin.

Kreizberg first conducted at Glyndebourne Opera in 1992, the Nikolaus Lehnhoff production of Leoš Janáček's Jenůfa. He returned in 1995 for Deborah Warner's production of Wolfgang Amadeus Mozart's Don Giovanni (1995, documented on DVD), and Lehnhoff's production of Janáček's Káťa Kabanová (1998). He spoke of opera conducting generally as follows:

Working in opera is the single best experience a conductor can get. Without it, he will never develop into what he could be. Singers, good and bad, teach you to be more flexible and to learn things a symphony orchestra will never teach you.

=== Orchestral posts ===
Kreizberg's duties as GMD in Krefeld-Mönchengladbach included the chief conductorship of the Niederrheinsche Sinfoniker. During his tenure, Kreizberg instituted special annual concerts devoted to an individual composer, which the orchestra continued after his tenure. In 1993, Kreizberg began his affiliation with the Jeunesses Musicales World Orchestra as its music director and chief conductor.

In the UK, Kreizberg made his debut at The Proms conducting the BBC Symphony Orchestra on 3 August 1993, and returned each year from 1994 to 2000. He served as principal conductor of the Bournemouth Symphony Orchestra from 1995 to 2000. During his Bournemouth tenure, he led the orchestra in its Carnegie Hall debut on 17 April 1997. With the Bournemouth SO, he conducted the UK premiere of Berthold Goldschmidt's Passacaglia, op. 4, on 25 July 1996 in the presence of the composer, just months before Goldschmidt died. He also conducted the premiere of Peteris Vasks's Symphony No. 2 on 30 July 1999 at The Proms.

From 2003 to 2011, Kreizberg was chief conductor and artistic advisor of the Netherlands Philharmonic Orchestra and the Netherlands Chamber Orchestra. With his Netherlands ensembles, he recorded regularly for Pentatone, which included several concerto recordings with Julia Fischer. Kreizberg and Fischer worked together regularly, and Fischer recalled her first meeting with Kreizberg in Philadelphia, where both artists were performing the violin concerto by Aram Khachaturian for the first time, following her arrival after a physically exhausting journey:

Ich also mit der Geige in der Hand vom Auto auf die Bühne, seit fast zwei Tagen nicht geschlafen – ich war wirklich an meiner körperlichen Grenze. Wir trafen uns vor den Augen des Orchesters: Hallo, ich bin Yakov, ich bin Julia, schon mussten wir anfangen. Und es war, als hätten wir das Stück bereits hundertmal miteinander gespielt. Wir haben es völlig gleich interpretiert. (So I had the violin in my hand for nearly two days, without sleep, from the car to the stage – I was really at my physical limit. We met in front of the orchestra: Hey, I'm Yakov, I'm Julia, already we had to start. And it was as if we had already performed together a hundred times. We interpreted it exactly the same.)

Kreizberg had been scheduled to stand down formally from the Netherlands Philharmonic and Netherlands Chamber Orchestras at the end of the 2010–2011 season. His final concert was on 14 February 2011 with the Netherlands Philharmonic Orchestra at the Concertgebouw, Amsterdam, one month before his death.

Elsewhere in Europe, Kreizberg was principal guest conductor of the Vienna Symphony Orchestra from 2003 to 2009. In 2007, he received the Österreichisches Ehrenkreuz für Wissenschaft und Kunst in recognition of his music work in Austria. During the 2008–2009 season, Kreizberg was artist-in-residence at the Alte Oper Frankfurt, the first conductor to be so honoured. Kreizberg was music director and artistic director of the Monte Carlo Philharmonic Orchestra from 2009 until his death in 2011. His original contract had designated an appointment to the Monte Carlo post for 5 years, but his final illness had begun to manifest itself by the summer of 2010.

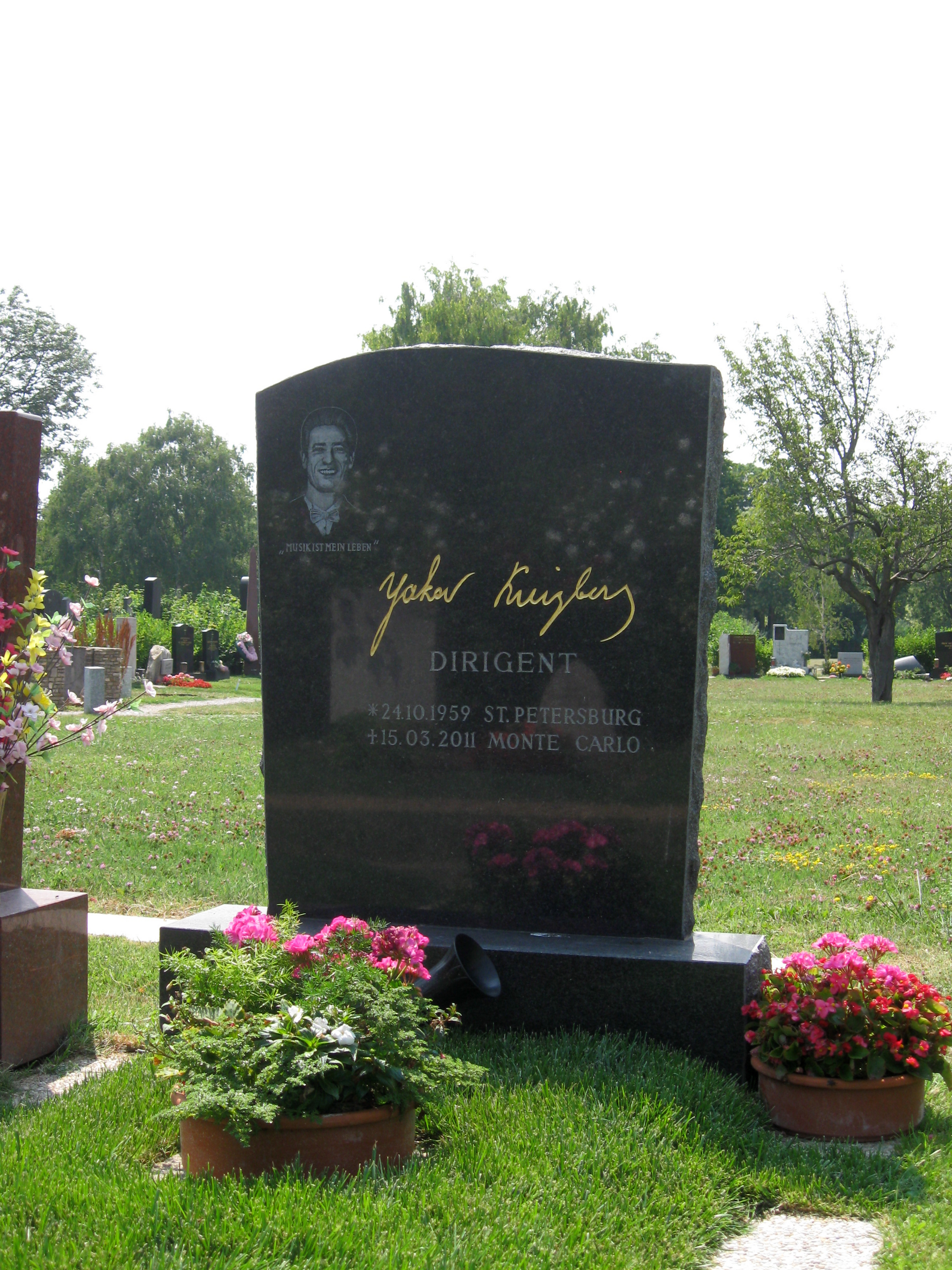
Grave of Yakov Kreizberg in Section 40 (reserved for honorary Austrians) in the Zentralfriedhof in Vienna

In the United States, Kreizberg made his Chicago Symphony Orchestra debut in 1992. His Los Angeles Philharmonic debut was in 1993 at the Hollywood Bowl. His New York Philharmonic debut was on 19 May 1999. With the Philadelphia Orchestra, he conducted over 30 concerts between 1999 and 2007, including deputising for the orchestra's then-outgoing music director Wolfgang Sawallisch on a 2003 tour of North and South America, when Sawallisch became too ill to travel.

In contemporary music, Kreizberg also conducted works by Judith Bingham, Jonathan Harvey, Hans Werner Henze, and Siegfried Matthus. As well, he led lesser-known works by Ernst Krenek, Franz Schmidt, Kurt Weill, Karol Szymanowski, and Igor Markevitch.

In addition to his recording work with his Dutch ensembles, Kreizberg also recorded commercially with the Vienna Symphony Orchestra and the Russian National Orchestra. His Vienna Symphony Orchestra recording of Bruckner's Symphony No. 7 received two Grammy Awards nominations. His final recording was a Decca release with Julia Fischer and the Monte Carlo Philharmonic of tone poems for violin and orchestra.

He died on 15 March 2011 in Monaco after a long illness, aged 51. His remains were later transferred from Monaco to the Zentralfriedhof in Vienna, with the inscription Musik ist mein Leben ('Music is my life') on his gravestone. His wife, American conductor Amy Andersson, and their two sons survived him.

== Critical reception ==
=== Dramatic power ===
Many reviews of Kreizberg's performances and recordings often attribute his unique qualities to his ability imbue music with dramatic power. Already in one of his earliest recordings, Goldschmidt's Chronica, it was noted "Kreizberg's Chronica has a zip that's missing elsewhere in the program ... " At a performance of Hans Werner Henze's opera König Hirsch at the Komische Oper, a critic noted: "The evening's most exciting aspect was the orchestra's brilliant playing under music director Yakov Kreizberg." A Gramophone review of the Don Giovanni video referred to him as "the fiery Yakov Kreizberg". And for Verdi's Macbeth, performed in 2006 at the Royal Opera House: " ... there was plenty of drama in the music, thanks to the efforts of conductor Yakov Kreizberg and a vocally meaty cast on stage," and: "Thanks to Yakov Kreizberg the Orchestra and Chorus obviously relished the score which sparkled and never lost the blood-and-thunder drama." In reviewing his recording of Dvořák's 8th symphony, one critic tried for a deeper understanding of Kreizberg's ability at producing a dramatic performance: "His slow presentation of the opening melody followed by a fiery allegro sets up a nice dynamic contrast. He plays the crucial dramatic pauses in the second movement effectively, and he builds the climaxes slowly and grandly without making it sound like Götterdämmerung. The fourth movement is excellent. Kreizberg generates plenty of excitement without becoming hysterical (though the French horns could have benefited from a tighter leash) ... Kreizberg 's approach to the tone poems is similar, and The Wild Dove is special. He again presents some tremendous dramatic contrasts, but the lighter, dance-like sections don't go as well in The Noon Witch. This is probably the best recording of The Wild Dove in terms of performance and sound ... These are fine performances with excellent sound ... "

Even in Mozart reviewers found plentiful drama: "Yakov Kreizberg launches the Sinfonia concertante in emphatic style: a no-nonsense tempo, lashing sforzando accents, a powerful forward impetus. Mozart's thrilling take on the slow-burn "Mannheim crescendo" has an almost ferocious intensity, enhanced by the recording's wide dynamic range."

Kreizberg apparently had a special affinity for Shostakovich's music. For his debut with the New York Philharmonic, he conducted Shostakovich's 11th Symphony: "The performance was riveting. Kreizberg, Russian-born and now living in Germany, has a remarkable baton technique using mostly very small, clear motions; conducting from memory, he seemed to become one with the music and the musicians, who played magnificently."

In the last year of his Bournemouth tenure: "After the interval Kreizberg conducted, from memory, the greatest live performance of Shostakovich's Fifth Symphony I have ever heard. Utterly faithful to the letter of the score, which is so rarely the case, he and the Bournemouth Orchestra were fully at one with the spirit of this original masterpiece. This was great conducting and exceptionally fine orchestral playing which almost literally took my breath away: a magnificent achievement." In a 2007 review with the Philadelphia Orchestra: "Several years ago Yakov Kreizberg conducted Shostakovich's 11th Symphony with the Philadelphia Orchestra in one of the most dramatic and incendiary live performances I have ever heard."

Tony Woodcock, past manager of the Bournemouth orchestra, recalled: "He had made a huge reputation for himself with this work because of his clear passion for it and his ability to mold an ensemble of intense musical and dramatic presence."

=== Attention to detail ===
Another aspect that many critics noted was Kreizberg's attention to detail, often in a way that they found unique. In one of his earliest reviews in the German press, a critic described his approach to Reimann's opera Toades as reflecting "superiority, concentration, conceptual analysis, breathing together of music and scene, of instrumental and vocal groups, and precision in detail." One critic commenting on Julia Fischer's recording of Russian violin concertos: "She was ably partnered throughout by Yakov Kreizberg, who led the Russian National Orchestra with splendid energy and an attention to detail." Concerning Kurt Weill's operas Der Protagonist and Royal Palace: "Yakov Kreizberg drew highly-detailed performances from the superb Vienna Symphony, catching all the bite, drive and lyricism of these neglected masterpieces." Concerning a 2003 performance of Mahler's First Symphony with the Oregon Symphony: "Kreizberg is an interpreter of big ideas, communicated in detailed exactness. He has two of the most expressive hands in the business, and he radiated rhythm from the podium. It added up to a kind of poetry of precision, with highly expressive results."

In the section on Kreizberg in his book Maestros in America: conductors in the 21st century, Roderick L. Sharpe summarized:

He has since been consistently praised for an impeccable stick technique that is taut, precise, well-articulated, and highly disciplined. There is never any question that he has prepared each performance thoroughly and meticulously, with every phrase and nuance considered. The resulting interpretations exhibit clear and imaginative ideas and a firm grasp of structure. His podium manner, the opposite of flamboyant, is not without charisma, and his deferential manner to soloists goes hand-in-hand with his reputation as an expert accompanist of both instrumentalists and singers. Reviewers have remarked on the sensitivity, passion, intensity, and immediacy of his performances. But the emotion is always held tautly in check, and it is this sense of control that has led other critics to find his readings cold and lacking atmosphere and spontaneity at times. This criticism aside, his achievements cannot be overrated.

=== As a collaborator ===
Kreizberg frequently received near-superlative reviews as a collaborator, probably because of his extensive experience accompanying singers from his time in college and continuing during his professional career as an opera conductor. In Julia Fischer's recording of the Tchaikovsky Violin Concerto: "It's a beautiful performance, reinforced by Kreizberg 's sensitive accompaniment and a more beautiful-sounding wind section than I thought I'd ever hear in a Russian orchestra." In a review of the recording of Shostakovich cello concertos: "Yakov Kreizberg recently notched up a notable success as a sympathetic concerto partner for Julia Fischer and Daniel Müller-Schott in Brahms's 'Double'. A similar level of preparation with regard [to] the orchestral accompaniment is evident in his finely balanced recording. In the First Concerto one feels the cello, pounding away at the ferocious double-stops, buoyantly pitched against the orchestra, the woodwind responding with incisive rhythmic precision ... "

Daniel Müller-Schott: "The first time we met was in 2005 in the States to perform the Dvořák Concerto. From that moment I felt we had a wonderful connection, one that would continue for years. After that we recorded the Brahms Double Concerto with Julia Fischer, which was fantastic, so when the possibility arose to record the Shostakovich, I felt he would be perfect."

In an interview in Gramophone, Julia Fischer was asked whether her collaboration with Kreizberg was beneficial:

It helps amazingly in my life. Young artists today stop seeing their teachers regularly very early, and go to tour the world. I now see my teacher every four or six months. And Yakov kind of fills that role for me. He sees me every month and goes through all the repertoire with me. When I play with him I play my best, and we both know so well from each other what we want.

Even regarding the relationship of conductor to orchestra, Kreizberg said: "It's like a ... relationship—it's give-and-take, it's being open minded and being flexible because nothing in life is ever quite the way you imagine it to be."

Florian Zwiauer (concertmaster of the Netherlands Philharmonic Orchestra) summed up Kreizberg: "He is a musician's conductor."

== Selected discography ==
- Khachaturian / Prokofiev / Glazunov – Russian Violin Concertos. Julia Fischer, Yakov Kreizberg, Russian National Orchestra. PENTATONE PTC 5186591 (2016 re-issue).
- Tchaikovsky – Violin Concerto in D / Sérénade mélancolique / Valse-Scherzo / Souvenir d'un lieu cher. PENTATONE PTC 5186610 (2016 re-issue).
- In Memoriam Yakov Kreizberg. Works by Antonín Dvořák, Claude Debussy, Richard Wagner, Franz Schmidt, Johann Strauss Jr.. Julia Fischer, Yakov Kreizberg, Netherlands Philharmonic Orchestra, Wiener Symphoniker, Russian National Orchestra. PENTATONE PTC 5186461 (2012).
- Antonín Dvořák – Symphony No. 6 & The Water Goblin. Yakov Kreizberg, Netherlands Philharmonic Orchestra. PENTATONE PTC 5186302 (2009).
- Antonín Dvořák – Symphony No. 7 & "The Golden Spinning Wheel". Yakov Kreizberg, Netherlands Philharmonic Orchestra. PENTATONE PTC 5186082 (2009).
- Johannes Brahms – Violin Concerto & Double Concerto for Violin and Cello. Julia Fischer, Daniel Müller-Schott, Yakov Kreizberg, Netherlands Philharmonic Orchestra. PENTATONE PTC 5186066 (2007).
- Antonín Dvořák – Symphony No.8 & Holoubek, Op.110 & Polednice, Op. 108. Yakov Kreizberg, Netherlands Philharmonic Orchestra. PENTATONE PTC 5186065 (2007).
- Dmitri Shostakovich – Symphonies Nos. 5&9 Op.47&Op.70. Yakov Kreizberg, Russian National Orchestra. PENTATONE PTC 5186096 (2007).
- Johann Strauss – Waltzes. PENTATONE PTC 5186052. (2006).
- Peter Ilyich Tchaikovsky – Violin concerto – Sérénade mélancolique – Valse – Souvenir d'un lieu cher. Julia Fischer, Yakov Kreizberg, Russian National Orchestra. PENTATONE PTC 5186095 (2006).
- Tour de France musicale. Yakov Kreizberg, Works by Maurice Ravel, Gabriel Fauré, Claude Debussy. Netherlands Philharmonic Orchestra. PENTATONE PTC 5186058 (2005).
- Richard Wagner – Preludes & Overtures. Yakov Kreizberg, Netherlands Philharmonic Orchestra. PENTATONE PTC 5186041 (2004).
- Anton Bruckner – Symphony No. 7. Yakov Kreizberg, Wiener Symphoniker. PENTATONE PTC 5186051 (2005).
- Khachaturian, Prokofiev, Glazunov – Russian Violin Concertos. Julia Fischer, Yakov Kreizberg, Russian National Orchestra. PENTATONE PTC 5186059 (2004).
- Antonín Dvořák – 'New World' Symphony & Tchaikovsky – "Romeo and Juliet" Overture. Yakov Kreizberg, Netherlands Philharmonic Orchestra. PENTATONE PTC 5186019 (2003).
- Franz Schmidt – Symphony No.4 & Orchestral music from "Notre Dame". Yakov Kreizberg, Netherlands Philharmonic Orchestra. PENTATONE PTC 5186015 (2003).

== Decorations and awards ==
- Diapason d'Or
- Echo Prize
- 1997 German Critics Prize
- 2007 Austrian Cross of Honour for Science and Art for services to the musical life of Austria
- 2008 Honorary citizenship of Austria

Cultural offices
Preceded by Reingard Schwarz	Generalmusikdirektor, Theater Krefeld und Mönchengladbach; 1988–1994	Succeeded by
Preceded by Rolf Reuter	Generalmusikdirektor, Komische Oper Berlin; 1994–2001	Succeeded by Kirill Petrenko
Preceded by Andrew Litton	Principal Conductor, Bournemouth Symphony Orchestra; 1995–2000	Succeeded by Marin Alsop
Preceded by Hartmut Haenchen	Chief Conductor, Netherlands Philharmonic Orchestra; 2003–2011	Succeeded by Marc Albrecht
