= Netherlands Chamber Orchestra =

Dutch chamber orchestra based in Amsterdam

The Netherlands Chamber Orchestra (NKO; Dutch, Nederlands Kamerorkest) is a Dutch chamber orchestra based in Amsterdam. The NKO is part of the Stichting Nederlands Philharmonisch Orkest (Netherlands Philharmonic Orchestra Foundation), along with the Netherlands Philharmonic. The core of the NKO is a group of at least 20 string instrumentalists. The orchestra does not have wind, percussion and harp players as permanent orchestra members, but instead utilises such instrumentalists from the Netherlands Philharmonic. The orchestra is headquartered and rehearses at the Beurs van Berlage, Amsterdam.

== History ==
The NKO was established in 1955, and gave its first concert that year at the Holland Festival. In 1985, the NKO was merged with the Amsterdam Philharmonic Orchestra and the Utrecht Symphony Orchestra to form the Stichting Nederlands Philharmonisch Orkest. The NKO still continues to give concerts under its own name, including a 50th anniversary commemorative concert in the Concertgebouw, Amsterdam.

The first chief conductor and leader of the orchestra was Szymon Goldberg, from 1955 to 1979. During Goldberg's tenure, David Zinman served as the orchestra's "second conductor" (tweede dirigent). From 1979 to 1986, Antoni Ros-Marbà was chief conductor of the NKO. From 1986 to 2002, the first period of the merger of the NKO into the NPO Foundation, Hartmut Haenchen was chief conductor of both the NKO and the Netherlands Philharmonic. Philippe Entremont has served as principal guest conductor of the NKO. Yakov Kreizberg succeeded Haenchen as chief conductor of the NKO and the Netherlands Philharmonic in 2003, and held the posts until his death in March 2011.

Since 2004, Gordan Nikolitch has served as NKO concertmaster. In March 2009, the NKO announced the appointment of Marc Albrecht as the orchestra's fifth chief conductor, starting with the 2011-2012 season, for an initial contract of 4 years, in parallel with his appointment as chief conductor of the Netherlands Philharmonic and of Dutch National Opera. Albrecht concluded his NKO chief conductorship at the close of the 2019-2020 season. In April 2019, the Netherlands Philharmonic announced the appointment of Lorenzo Viotti as its next chief conductor, effective with the 2021-2022 season. With this Netherlands Philharmonic appointment, Viotti simultaneously became chief conductor of the NKO. In April 2023, the NKO announced the scheduled conclusion of Viotti's tenure as its chief conductor at the close of the 2024-2025 season.

In Amsterdam, the NKO gives around 15 concerts per season at the Concertgebouw. The NKO also performs as one of several orchestras in productions at De Nederlandse Opera.

== Chief Conductors ==
- Szymon Goldberg (1955–1979)
- Antoni Ros-Marbà (1979–1986)
- Hartmut Haenchen (1986–2002)
- Yakov Kreizberg (2003–2011)
- Marc Albrecht (2011–2020)
- Lorenzo Viotti (2021–2025)
