= Épinal International Piano Competition =

Biannual piano competition held in Épinal, France

The Épinal International Piano Competition is a biannual piano competition held in Épinal, France. Founded in 1970, it is a member of the WFIMC since 1979.

== Winners ==
Year	1st Prize	2nd Prize	3rd Prize	4th Prize	Medals
1970	not awarded	(France) Gérard Lucasse (France) Wilfried Jeandidier	not awarded	not awarded	
1971	not awarded	(Bulgaria) Ana Dimova (West Germany) Rainer Gepp (Switzerland) Urs Ruchti	not awarded	not awarded	
1973	(Philippines) María Luisa López Vito	(France) Chantal Riou	(Japan) Yukari Shimizu	(West Germany) Gerhard Oppitz	
1975	(West Germany) Bernd Goetzke (United Kingdom) Dennis Lee	(France) Jean-Gabriel Ferlan	not awarded	not awarded	
1977	(Spain) Josep Colom	(France) Philippe Bianconi	(Hungary) József Takács	(Japan) Michiko Katabuchi	
1979	(Japan) Kei Itoh	(France) Nathalie Béra-Tagrine (Brazil) Edson Elias	not awarded	(Belgium) Maureen Bothuyne	(United Kingdom) Michael Bell (France) Laurent Cabasso (France) François Killian (Greece) Theodore Kotepanos
1981	(Japan) Mayumi Kameda	not awarded	(Romania) Dan Atanasiu	(France) Jean-Marie Bonn (Japan) Mariko Hattori	(Netherlands) Jopp Celis (Japan) Tarko Oshima (Poland) Alexander Woronicki (France) Norbert Zabaly
1983	(Poland) Kornelia Ogórkówna	(France) Hervé Billaut	(United States) Helene Jeanney	not awarded	(Japan) Hiroyuki Abe (France) Carol Carniel (Spain) Sergio de los Cobos (Socialist Federal Republic of Yugoslavia) Jasmina Stancul (West Germany) Daniela Steinbach
1985	(West Germany) Konrad Elser	(Romania) Constantin Sandu	(Switzerland) Sylviane Deferne	(Belgium) Cécile Muller	(France) Olivier Cazal (South Korea) Kyung Hai-ho (Japan) Reiko Nakoki (Japan) Shinnosuke Tashiro
1987	(France) Isabelle Dubuis (Japan) Momo Kodama	not awarded	(Japan) Nabuyuki Nagaoka	(France) Yves Rault	(West Germany) Michaela Fahrland (France) Miklos Schön (Netherlands) Sander-Paul Sittig (Japan) Takayuki Ito
1989	(United Kingdom) Christopher Oakden (Japan) Kyoko Tabe	not awarded	not awarded	(Italy) Gabriela Dolfi	(United Kingdom) C. Lewelyn (France) Pierre Morabia
1991	(Soviet Union) Lala Mustafazadeh	(Hungary) Gergely Bogányi	(Soviet Union) Veronika Reznikovsky	(Soviet Union) Lev Vinocour	(New Zealand) Read Gainsford (Japan) Megumi Hashiba (Japan) Kyunghae Oh (Soviet Union) Tatiana Veretennikova
1993	(Russia) Lev Vinocour	(South Korea) Choi Hie-yon (Italy) Giampaolo Stuani	not awarded	(Italy) Maurizio Baglini	(Uzbekistan) Gulnora Alimova (Germany) Igor Kamenz (Russia) Natalia Kislenko (Russia) Jura Margulis
1995	(Israel) Aviram Reichert	(Russia) Yuri Martinov	(Italy) Simone Gragnani	(Japan) Riu Miyata	(Romania) Julia-Maria Dobrescu (Georgia (country)) Guilga Katsarava (France) Jean-Pascal Meyer (Russia) Ilona Timchenko (Russia) Alexandra Trusova
1997	(China) Chen Jiang	(Russia) Sergey Glavatsky	(Russia) Sergey Kudriakov	(United Kingdom) Graham Caskie	(Italy) Alessandra-Maria Ammara (Japan) Rinko Hama (Japan) Tamayo Ikeda (Federal Republic of Yugoslavia) Tamara Stefanović
1999	(Japan) Mako Okamoto	(Russia) Ekaterina Mechetina	(Belgium) Maxence Pilchen	(Japan) Yuka Kobayashi	(Canada) Lucille Chung (South Korea) Hwang Sung-hoon (Georgia (country)) Tamriko Kordzaia (Poland) Pawel Mazurkiewicz (Japan) Saori Mizumura (Armenia) Zaraiu Sumyan
2001	(Ukraine) Serhiy Salov	(South Korea) Hwan Sung-hoon	(Japan) Tomomi Tsujimoto	(France) Olivier Moulin	(United Kingdom) Sam Armstrong (France) Emmanuelle Bouillot (Belgium) Michèle Gurdal (Japan) Kumiko Nakada
2003	(South Korea) Kim Sung-hun	(France) Jean-Frédéric Neuburger	(United Kingdom) Tom Poster	(Japan) Masataka Goto	(South Korea) Kim Na-young (France) Aimo Pagin (Russia) Anastasia Terenkova
2005	not awarded	(South Korea) Han Sang-il (Estonia) Irina Zahharenkova	not awarded	(Russia) Natalia Zagalskaya	(France) Eric Artz (South Korea) Cho Min-sol (United States) Katie Mahan
2007	(South Korea) Lim Ho-yeul	(South Korea) Kim So-yeon (South Korea) Lee Hyo-joo	not awarded	(France) Eric Artz	(Switzerland) Christian Chamorel (Japan) Sayako Hoki (China) Julian Jia (Japan) Daiki Kato
2009	(Russia) Ksenia Rodionova	(China) Wang Chao	(Japan) Kana Okada	(Russia) Yulia Lapchinskaya	(France) Patrick Hemmerlé (Japan) Akihito Okuda (Greece) Marios Panteliadis (South Korea) Seo Eu-young
2011	(South Korea) Kim Da-sol	(Russia) Andrey Dubov	(Japan) Akihito Okada	(South Korea) Rhee Yon-soo	(Latvia) Arta Arnicane (South Korea) Kim Ye-dam (South Korea) Moon Jin-ho (South Korea) Won Jing-ho
2013	(South Korea) Kim Ye-dam	(Armenia) Ashot Khachaturyan	(United Kingdom) Melissa Gore	(Belarus) Arseni Sadykov	(France) Jonathan Fournel (Greece) Marios Panteliadis (Japan) Ayane Shoda (Germany) Katharina Treutler
2015	(France) Guillaume Bellom	(Japan) Keigo Mukawa	(South Korea) Seung Hyun Lee	(Kazakhstan) Oxana Shevchenko	
2017	(Russia) Vitaly Starikov	(South Korea) Hyo-Eun Park	(United Kingdom) Dominic Degavino	(Japan) Moeko Ezaki	
2019	(Belgium) Valère Burnon	(Taiwan) Hao-Wei Lin	(Japan) Takeshi Shimozato	(Czech Republic) Pjotr Naryskin	
