= Eurico Carrapatoso =

Portuguese composer (born 1962)

Eurico Carrapatoso ComIH (born February 15, 1962, in Mirandela) is a Portuguese composer.

== Awards and honors ==
- 2021: DSCH - Schostakovich Ensemble Prize, with his Pour la fin, pour mon Commencement, for clarinet, violin, cello and piano
- 2021: Alumni Salamanca University Jesús García Bernalt Prize, with his Quando, for mixed choir a cappella
- 2017: Performing Rights Society SPA Prize Prémio Autores 2017
- 2011: Tree of Life Prize
- 2006: UNESCO International Rostrum of Composers, Paris, with his O meu poemário infantil for tenor and orchestra
- 2004: Decorated by the President of Portuguese Republic with Commendation of the Order of the Infante Dom Henrique
- 2001: National Identity Prize
- 1999: Francisco de Lacerda Composition Prize
- 1999: UNESCO International Rostrum of Composers, Paris, with his Sorrow on the death of Jorge Peixinho for large orchestra
- 1998: UNESCO International Rostrum of Composers, Paris, with his Cinco melodias em forma de Montemel for soprano, horn and piano
- 1998: Lopes-Graça Prize from the City of Tomar

== Main works ==
STAGE WORKS

- Peer, you're lying!

2001

incidental music for the Ibsen's play Peer Gynt

Opus: 38

Duration (minutes) 110

1(picc).1(ca).1(bcl).1 - hn - perc(2) - pno - 2 vln.vla.vlc.db (with C extension)

Commission: The New Teatro Aberto

First Performance: 24.2.02, Teatro Aberto, Lisbon: Teatro Aberto's Ensemble, Joao Paulo Santos

- Wolf Diogo and Mosquito Valentim

2002

scenic cantata for two singers, speaker, children's choir and orchestra

Opus: 41

Duration (minutes) 50

Instrumentation: 2(2=picc).2.2.2. - 2hn - timp - strings (some basses with C extension)

Singers: Fox Rose (soprano), Wolf Diogo (bass), speaker, children's choir

Text: Antonio Pires Cabral

Language: Portuguese

Commission: Porto National Orchestra

First Performance: 20.12.02, S.John National Theater, Oporto: Angélica Neto / Jorge Vaz de Carvalho / Paulo Pires / C.P.O. Children's Choir / Porto National Orchestra / Joao Paulo Santos

- The Forest

2004

children's opera in two acts and sixteen scenes for five singers and orchestra

Opus: 47

Duration (minutes) 65

Instrumentation: 1(picc).1(ca).1(bcl).1(cbsn).sax(ssax) - 2hn - perc(1) - guit - harp - pno - strings (some basses with C extension)

Singers: Isabel (soprano), Dwarf (bass), Bandit (baritone), Wise man (baritone), Music Teacher (tenor), Tree (speaker), children's choir, male choir (ad libitum)

Text: Ana Maria Magalhaes and Isabel Alçada after Sophia de Mello Breyner Andresen

Language: Portuguese

Commission: Teatro Nacional de São Carlos (Portuguese National Opera House)

First Performance: 28.2.04, Sao Luiz Theater, Lisbon: Angelica Neto / Jose Corvelo / Armando Possante / Rui Baeta / National Conservatoire Children's Choir / Portuguese Symphony Orchestra / Joao Paulo Santos

- The death of Ludwig II of Bavaria

2010

music drama in one act and one scene for soprano, mezzo, chorus and orchestra

Opus: 58

Duration (minutes) 13

Instrumentation: 2hn - timp - strings (some basses with C extension)

Singers: Death (soprano), Providence (mezzo), mixed choir

Libreto: João Botelho after Bernardo Soares's text (one of Fernando Pessoa heteronyms) Funeral march for Ludwig II of Bavaria (in The Book of Disquiet - 1920's ~ 30's)

Language: Portuguese

Commission: AR DE FILMES

First Performance: 13.12.2010, open space, Sintra Forest (the Glorious Eden, quoting Byron)

- Sabina Freire

2009-2010

opera in three acts and thirty scenes for eight singers and orchestra

Opus: 60

Duration (minutes) 120

Instrumentation: 1(picc).1(ca).2(bcl).2(cbsn) - 4hn. 1 - perc(1) - timp - harp - strings (some basses with C extension)

Singers: Sabina (soprano), D. Maria (baritone), Julio (baritone), Epifanio (tenor), Doctor Fino (bass), Padre Correia (tenor), Minister (baritone), Procurador Ferreira (baritone)

Libreto: Eurico Carrapatoso after Manuel Teixeira Gomes's play Sabina Freire (1905)

Language: Portuguese

Commission: Portimão Municipal Council

First Performance: 11.12.2010, TEMPO Auditorium, Portimão

- Mautempo em Portugal

2023

opera in eighteen scenes for eight singers and little orchestra

Opus: 81

Duration (minutes) 135

Instrumentation: 1(picc).0.1.0 - piano - string quintet or strings (some basses with C extension)

Singers: Bomtempo (baritone), Marcos Portugal (baritone), Garrett (baritone), José (soprano), Maria (mezzo), mixed choir

Libretto: Miguel Jesus (2023)

Language: Portuguese

Commission: Associação Setúbal Voz

First Performance: July 7, 2023, Luisa Todi Auditorium, Setúbal

- Por Todos Nós

2024-2026

opera in sixteen scenes for sixteen singers, choir and orchestra

Opus: 84

Duration (minutes) 180

Instrumentation: 1(=picc).1(=ca).1.1 - 3 - strings (some basses with C extension)

Singers: Ana Maria Machado (mezzo), Angel (high soprano), António Machado (baritone), Margarida Lota (mezzo), Miguel Ângelo (baritone), Embaixador (baritone), Chefe Nunes (tenor), Bronze (baritone), Tião Dolores (tenor), Umbela (tenor), Salamida (baritone), El Campeador (baritone), Viúva do Charlie 8 (alto), Pontais (bass), Ingrid (mezzo), Arnoldo (bass), mixed choir

Libretto: João Lourenço and Vera San Payo de Lemos (2024), after the novel "The Memorable" by Lídia Jorge

Language: Portuguese

Commission: Teatro Aberto

First Performance: May 20, 2026, Teatro Aberto, Lisbon

ORCHESTRAL WORKS

- Sorrow on the death of Jorge Peixinho

1998

large orchestra

Opus: 15

Duration (minutes) 18

Instrumentation: 2(2=picc).2(2=ca).2(2=bcl).2(2=cbsn)- 2.2.2.1 - perc(5) - timp - harp - strings (basses with C extension)

Commission: Macao's Music Festival

First Performance: 1.11.98, Sao Domingo's Church, Macao: Porto National Orchestra, Marc Foster

- Modes of unlimited expression

1998

Opus: 18

Duration (minutes) 16

Instrumentation: strings

First Performance: 10.10.98, Library of Mafra's National Palace: Lisbon Sinfonietta, Vasco Azevedo

First Recording: La ma de Guido LMG 2047: Lisbon Sinfonietta, Vasco Azevedo

- Modes of unlimited expression II

1999

large orchestra

Opus: 20

Duration (minutes) 18

Instrumentation: 2(2=picc).2(2=ca).2(1=picccl 2=bcl).2(2=cbsn)- 2.2.2.1 - perc(1) - timp - harp - pno - strings (some basses with C extension)

Commission: Lisbon Metropolitan Orchestra

First Performance: 9.6.98, Queluz's National Palace: Lisbon Metropolitan Orchestra, Miguel Graça Moura

- Aver-o-mar (Seeing-the-see)

1999

orchestra

Opus: 21

Duration (minutes) 18

Instrumentation: 2(2=picc).2(2=ca).2(1=picccl 2=bcl).2. - 2.2.2.1. - perc(1) - timp - strings (some basses with C extension)

Commission: Povoa's Music Festival

First Performance: 30.7.99, Povoa's Casino: Phillarmonia of Beiras, Osvaldo Ferreira

First Recording: Numerica, NUM 1108: Povoa Symphony Orchestra, Osvaldo Ferreira

- Praxitelic Music for two Gods from Olympus

2004

orchestra

Duration (minutes) 9

Instrumentation: 1.1.1.1. - 2.0.0.0. - perc(1) - harp - strings

Commission: Portuguese Symphony Orchestra and Portuguese National Opera House

First Performance: 12.11.04: Lisbon New University Auditorium, Portuguese Symphony Orchestra, Donato Renzetti

- Tempus fugit

2007-2008

large orchestra

Opus: 53

Duration (minutes) 20

Instrumentation: 3(3=picc).3(3=ca).3(2=picccl 3=bcl).2.cbsn- 4.3.3.1 - perc(3) - timp - harp - pno - strings (basses with C extension)

Commission: Rio de Janeiro's Culture Department

First Performance: 23.8.2008, Cecilia Meireles Room, Rio de Janeiro, Brazilian Symphony Orchestra, Flavio Florence

CHORAL - ORCHESTRAL WORKS

- Requiem (Passos Manuel in memoriam)

2004

Singers: baritone, mixed choir, orchestra

Instrumentation: 4 French horns - harp - strings (basses with C extension)

Opus: 48

Commission: Passos Canavarro Foundation

Duration (minutes) 50

Text: Latin Catholic Requiem Mass

Language: Latin

First Performance: 18.1.06, Graca Church, Santarém: Jorge Vaz de Carvalho (baritone), Lisboa Cantat Choir, Porto National Orchestra, Joao Paulo Santos

- Quatro cantos do mundo

2023

Singers: mixed choir, large orchestra

Instrumentation: 2(2=picc).2(2=ca).2.2 - 2.2.2.1 - perc(2) - pno - strings (basses with C extension)

Opus: 82

Commission: Teatro Nacional de São Carlos

Duration (minutes) 12

Text: Popular

Language: languages from Timor and Angola; Portuguese

First Performance: March 9, 2024, Teatro Nacional de São Carlos, Lisbon: São Carlos Choir, Portuguese Symphony Orchestra, Antonio Pirolli

CHORAL WORKS

- Drei lieder ohne worte

1997

SATB a-cappella

Duration (minutes) 7

First Performance: 3.11.98, Southwarck Cathedral, London: Lisbon Chamber Choir, Teresita Gutierrez Marques

First Recording: Numerica, NUM 1083: Lisbon Chamber Choir, Teresita Gutierrez Marques

- Missa sine nomine

2006

SATB a-cappella

Opus: 50

Duration (minutes) 16

Text: Latin Catholic Mass

Language: Latin

First Performance: 28.9.06, St. Cyprian Church, London: Helios Voices, Sergio Fontao

- Our Lady's Diptic

2007

SATB / Organ

Opus: 52

Duration (minutes) 12

Text: Stabat Mater and Salve Regina

Language: Latin

Commission: Lisbon Classical University

First Performance: 16.6.07, Sao Roque Church, Lisbon: Lisbon University Chamber Choir, David Cranmer, Jose Robert

- Stabat Mater

2008

Singers: baritone, chamber choir (ssaattbb)

Instrumentation: 1(picc).1(ca).1(bcl) - 1.1(A picc, flugelh) - perc(1) - harp - pno - 2 vl.vla.vc.db (with C extension)

Opus: 54

Duration (minutes) 25

Text: Stabat Mater and Deus Benino (Luis de Camões)

Language: Latin and Portuguese

Commission: Belém Cultural Center (CCB)

First Performance: 18.3.08, Belém Cultural Center, Lisbon: Armando Possante, Olisipo Choir, OrchestrUtopica, Cesario Costa

CHAMBER WORKS

- Suite d'Aquem e d'Alem mar

2000

String quartet and marimba

Duration (minutes) 10

First Performance: 1.11.01, Purcell Room, London: Chilingirian Quartet and Pedro Carneiro

- In illo tempore

2009

String quartet

Opus: 56

Duration (minutes) 25

Commission: Matosinhos's Municipal Council

First Performance: 12.11.09, Constantino Nery Theater: Matosinhos String Quartet

- O espelho da alma (The soul's mirror)

2009

Piano quartet (pno - vl.vla.vc.)

Opus: 57

Duration (minutes) 18

Commission: Torres Vedras's Municipal Council

First Performance: 27.11.09, Torres Vedras Auditorium: Ensemble Darcos

== Publishers ==
- Boosey & Hawkes
- BIM Editions
- Carus-Verlag

== Main performers ==
Conductors

Stefan Asbury, Vasco Azevedo, Joana Carneiro, Pedro Carneiro, Simon Carrington, Nuno Corte-Real, Cesario Costa, Osvaldo Ferreira, Flavio Florence, Mark Foster, Patrick Gallois, Miguel Graca-Moura, Pablo Heras-Casado, Antonio Lourenco, Vytautas Lukocius, Wojciech Michniewski, Misha Rachlevsky, Donato Renzetti, Joao Paulo Santos, Joao Tiago Santos, Ernst Schelle, Brian Schembri, Nils Schweckendiek, Marc Tardue, Cara Tasher, Tapio Tuomela, Maciej Zoltowski

Orchestras

Porto National Orchestra, Portuguese Symphony Orchestra, Lisbon Sinfonietta, Gulbenkian Orchestra, Lisbon Metropolitan Orchestra, Orchestre des Pays de Savoie, Deutsche Oper Berlin Chamber Orchestra, Lithuanian Chamber Orchestra, Brazilian Symphony Orchestra, Chamber Orchestra Kremlin, Finnish Uusinta Kamariorkesteri, Jyväskylä Sinfonia, S.Petersburg Kapella Symphony Orchestra

Ensembles

Remix Ensemble, OrchestrUtopica, Grupo de Musica Contemporanea de Lisboa, Opus Ensemble, Ensemble Darcos, Galliard Ensemble, Chilingirian String Quartet, New Zealand String Quartet, Carion Woodwind Quintet, Ensemble Mediterrain, Matosinhos String Quartet, SONOR Ensemble

Choirs

MDR Rundfunkchor (Philipp Ahmann), The University of Michigan Men's Glee Club (Eugene Rogers), UNF Chamber Singers (Cara Tasher), Estonian Philharmonic Chamber Choir (Daniel Reuss), Gulbenkian Choir (Joana Carneiro), Ars Nova Vocal Ensemble (Katalin Kiss), Coro Casa da Musica (Simon Carrington), Coral de Letras da Universidade do Porto (Borges Coelho)
