= Lawrence Foster =

American conductor

Lawrence Foster (born October 23, 1941) is an American conductor of Romanian ancestry.

== Early life ==
Foster was born in Los Angeles, California, to Jewish-Romanian parents. His father died when Foster was three years old. He was later adopted by his stepfather, from whom he took the surname Foster.

Foster studied conducting with German conductor Fritz Zweig and piano with Joanna Grauden, both in Los Angeles. His other teachers and mentors have included: Karl Böhm, Bruno Walter, Henry Lewis, and Franz Waxman.

== Career ==
Foster became the conductor of the San Francisco Ballet at the age of 18, and served as assistant conductor of the Los Angeles Philharmonic under Zubin Mehta. He was awarded the Koussevitzky Conducting Prize at Tanglewood in 1966. In 1969 he was named chief guest conductor of the Royal Philharmonic Orchestra in London. He has held music directorships with the Houston Symphony, the Ojai Music Festival, the Monte-Carlo Philharmonic Orchestra, the Duisburg Philharmonic, the Jerusalem Symphony Orchestra, and the Barcelona Symphony Orchestra and National Orchestra of Catalonia, among others.

In 1990, Foster was appointed music director of the Aspen Music Festival and School.

From 2002 to 2013, Foster was the music director of the Gulbenkian Orchestra of Lisbon, Portugal. He also served as music director of the Orchestre National de Montpellier and the Opéra National de Montpellier from 2009 to 2012. Foster was music director of Opéra de Marseille and the Orchestre philharmonique de Marseille from 2012 to 2023. From 2019 to 2023, Foster was artistic director and chief conductor of the Polish National Radio Symphony Orchestra (NOSPR).

Foster is particularly noted as an interpreter of the works of George Enescu, and has made a comprehensive survey of commercial recordings of Enescu's music. He served as artistic director of the George Enescu Festival from 1998 to 2001. In 2003, Foster was decorated by the president for services to Romanian music.

In 2023, Foster was awarded the Romanian National Order of Merit, Commander, for his contribution to Romanian culture and promotion of the music of Enescu.

Foster has recorded commercially for such labels as Pentatone,> including Gordon Getty's opera Usher House, Schumann's symphonies, orchestral works by Kodály, Bartók and Ligeti, and piano and violin concertos by Bruch, Korngold, Rachmaninoff, Grieg and Chopin, with various soloists. His recording of Enescu's Oedipe was awarded the Grand Prix du Disque from the Académie Charles Cros in France.

== Selected discography ==
- Richard Strauss – Violin Concerto / Miniatures. Arabella Steinbacher, Lawrence Foster, WDR Symphony Orchestra Cologne. Pentatone PTC 5186653 (2018).
- Johann Strauss Jr – Die Fledermaus. Lawrence Foster, Nikolai Schukoff, Laura Aikin, NDR Radiophilharmonie, WDR Rundfunkchor Köln. Pentatone PTC 5186635 (2018).
- Mephistopheles and Other Bad Guys. Lawrence Foster, Kevin Short, Orchestre philharmonique de Marseille, male chorus of the Opéra de Marseille. Pentatone PTC 5186585 (2018).
- A Certain Slant of Light. Lisa Delan, Orchestre philharmonique de Marseille. Pentatone PTC 5186634 (2018).
- Martinu – Double Concertos. Mari Kodama, Momo Kodama, Sarah Nemtanu, Deborah Nemtanu, Magali Demesse, Orchestre philharmonique de Marseille. Pentatone PTC 5186658 (2018).
- Giuseppe Verdi – Otello. Nikolai Schukoff, Melody Moore, Lester Lynch, Kevin Short, Lawrence Foster, Gulbenkian Orchestra. Pentatone PTC 5186562 (2017)
- Fantasies, Rhapsodies and Daydreams. Works by Camille Saint-Saëns, Maurice Ravel, Ralph Vaughan Williams, Pablo de Sarasate, Jules Massenet. Arabella Steinbacher, Lawrence Foster, Orchestre Philharmonique de Monte-Carlo Pentatone PTC 5186536 (2016).
- Max Bruch & Erich Korngold Violin Concertos & Ernest Chausson Poème. Arabella Steinbacher, Lawrence Foster, Gulbenkian Orchestra Pentatone PTC 5186503 (2013)
- Gordon Getty – Usher House. Étienne Dupuis, Phillip Ens, Lisa Delan, Christian Elsner, Lawrence Foster, Benedict Cumberbatch, Gulbenkian Orchestra. Pentatone PTC 518645 (2013).
- Johann Strauss Jr. – Der Zigeunerbaron (Operetta in 3 acts; version 1886). Nikolai Schukoff, Jochen Schmeckenbecher, Markus Brück, Jasmina Sakr, Claudia Barainsky, Heinz Zednik, Paul Kaufmann, Khatuna Mikaberidze, Renate Pitscheider, Lawrence Foster, NDR Philharmonie, NDR Chor. Pentatone PTC 5186482 (2016).
- Rachmaninov & Grieg – Piano Concertos Sa Chen, Lawrence Foster, Gulbenkian Orchestra. Pentatone PTC 5186444 (2011).
- Antonio Salieri Requiem in C minor, Beethoven Meeresstille und Glückliche Fahrt, Schubert Intende voci. Lawrence Foster, Coro Gulbenkian, Gulbenkian Orchestra Pentatone PTC 5186359 (2010).
- Zoltán Kodály, Béla Bartók, György Ligeti – Orchestral Works. Lawrence Foster, Mihaela Costea, Esther Georgie, Cyril Dupuy, Jonathan Luxton, Kenneth Best, Gulbenkian Orchestra. Pentatone PTC 5186360 (2010).
- Robert Schumann – Symphonies Nos. 3 & 4. Lawrence Foster, Czech Philharmonic. Pentatone PTC 5186327 (2009).
- Robert Schumann – Symphonies Nos. 1 & 2. Lawrence Foster, Czech Philharmonic. Pentatone PTC 5186326 (2008).
- Frédéric Chopin – The 2 Piano Concertos. Sa Chen, Lawrence Foster, Gulbenkian Orchestra. Pentatone PTC 5186341 (2008).
- George Enescu – Symphonies 1-3, Vox Maris. Lawrence Foster, Monte-Carlo Philharmonic Orchestra, Orchestre National de Lyon. EMI Classics (2005)
- Carl Nielsen, Max Bruch – Violin concertos. Nikolaj Znaider, Lawrence Foster, London Philharmonic Orchestra. EMI Classics (2000).
- Concertos from My Childhood – Itzhak Perlman, Lawrence Foster, Juilliard Orchestra. EMI Classics: 7243 5 56750 2 6 (1999).
- Paul McCartney – Standing Stone, Lawrence Foster, London Symphony Orchestra. EMI Classics: 7243 5 56484 2 6 (1997)
- Wieniawski, Sarasate – Violin concertos Nos. 1 & 2, Zigeunerweisen. Gil Shaham, Lawrence Foster, London Symphony Orchestra. Deutsche Grammaphon: D 100185 (1991)
- George Enescu – Œdipe. José van Dam, Barbara Hendricks, Brigitte Fassbaender, Marjana Lipovšek, Lawrence Foster, Monte-Carlo Philharmonic Orchestra. EMI/Warner (1990)
- William Walton – Troilus and Cressida. Janet Baker, Richard Cassilly, Gerald English, Benjamin Luxon, Richard Van Allan, Elizabeth Bainbridge; Lawrence Foster, Orchestra and Chorus of the Royal Opera House Covent Garden (version for mezzo-soprano). HMV SLS 997 (1977)
- Ludwig van Beethoven – Piano Concerto No. 3. Radu Lupu, Lawrence Foster, London Symphony Orchestra. Decca Classics (1971)

Cultural offices
Preceded by Miltiades Caridis	Chief Conductor, Duisburg Philharmonic; 1982–1987	Succeeded by Alexander Lazarev
Preceded by Armin Jordan	Artistic Director, Orchestre de Chambre de Lausanne; 1985–1990	Succeeded by Jesús López Cobos
Preceded by Gary Bertini	Music Director, Jerusalem Symphony Orchestra; 1988–1992	Succeeded by David Shallon
Preceded by Jorge Mester	Music Director, Aspen Music Festival and School; 1990–1998	Succeeded by David Zinman
Preceded by Luis Antonio García Navarro	Music Director, Barcelona Symphony Orchestra and National Orchestra of Catalonia; 1994–2002	Succeeded by Ernest Martínez Izquierdo
Preceded by Muhai Tang	Principal Conductor, Gulbenkian Orchestra; 2002–2013	Succeeded by Paul McCreesh
Preceded by Friedemann Layer	Music Director, Opéra national de Montpellier; 2009–2012	Succeeded by Michael Schønwandt
Preceded by Cyril Diederich	Music Director, Orchestre philharmonique de Marseille; 2012–2023	Succeeded by Michele Spotti
Preceded by Alexander Liebreich	Artistic Director and Chief Conductor, Polish National Radio Symphony Orchestra; 2019–2023	Succeeded by Marin Alsop
