= Meeresstille und glückliche Fahrt =

Meeresstille und glückliche Fahrt can refer to:

- Meeresstille und glückliche Fahrt (Beethoven), a cantata by Ludwig van Beethoven
- Meeresstille und glückliche Fahrt (Mendelssohn), a concert overture by Felix Mendelssohn
