= Karin Kei Nagano =

American pianist (born 1998)

- Born: 1998 (age 27–28); Berkeley, California, U.S.
- Genres: Classical
- Occupation: Pianist
- Instrument: Piano
- Label: Analekta

Karin Kei Nagano (born 1998) is an American pianist.

== Early life and education ==
Nagano was born in Berkeley, California. She began studying piano at age 3, first with Elena Filonova, then with Germaine Mounier, in Paris. She also studied with Igor Lazko, Vadim Suhanov and Alexander Paley. After that, she continued studying with Vera Gornostayeva in Moscow and Collette Zerah, a renowned French pianist.

== Career ==
Nagano began competing internationally in 2007. That year she won the First Prize at the Paris International Scriabin Competition. Afterwards, she has won First Prize and Best Interpretation Prize at the Berlin International Piano Competition and First Prize at the Anton Rubinstein International Piano Competition (2009–10). Her professional debut in 2007 was in a performance of the Mozart Piano Concerto K246 with the orchestra of Dr. Wachtang Korisheli. She has also appeared with the Bayerische Staatsorchester at the Grassau Festival, Orchestre symphonique de Montréal, Tafelmusik Baroque Orchestra, the Schwaebisches Jugendsymphoniorchester, and the Attaca Orchestra.

In February 2014, Karin Kei Nagano released one disc on the Analekta label with the Cecilia Quartet featuring two of Mozart's early piano concertos, Nos. 12 & 13. In March 2017, Karin released her second recording on the Analekta label featuring Bach's Inventions & Sinfonies, BWV 772–801.

== Personal life ==
Nagano is the daughter of the Japanese-American conductor Kent Nagano and the Japanese concert pianist Mari Kodama.

== Discography ==
- Mozart, Wolfgang Amadeus; Nagano, Karin Kei; Cecilia String Quartet (2014), Piano concertos nos. 12 & 13 = Concertos pour piano (in no linguistic content), [Montréal]: Analekta, OCLC 1057269499
- Bach, Johann Sebastian; Nagano, Karin Kei (2017), Inventions & sinfonias, BWV 772–801 = Inventions et sinfonies (in no linguistic content), [Montréal]: Analekta, OCLC 1030893016
- Nagano, Karin Kei; Schubert, Franz; Messiaen, Olivier (2020), Reincarnation (in no linguistic content), Quebec: Analekta, OCLC 1252628432
- Kodama, Mari; Kodama, Momo; Nagano, Karin Kei; Nagano, Kent; Orchestre de la Suisse romande (2024), Double & triple piano concertos (in no linguistic content), [Baarn]: Pentatone, OCLC 1455474954
