= Gulbenkian Orchestra =

Portuguese symphony orchestra

The Gulbenkian Orchestra (Portuguese: Orquestra Gulbenkian) is a Portuguese symphony orchestra based in Lisbon. The orchestra primarily gives concerts at the Grande Auditório (Grand Auditorium) of the Gulbenkian Foundation. The orchestra, which was founded in 1962 as a chamber orchestra, currently has 66 permanent musicians.

== History ==
The Calouste Gulbenkian Foundation founded the orchestra in 1962 as the Orquestra de Câmara Gulbenkian (Gulbenkian Chamber Orchestra), consisting of 12 musicians. The ensemble subsequently expanded in size and took on its current name in 1971.

The orchestra made its American debut in November 1997 in Newark, New Jersey.

Past principal conductors of the orchestra have included Claudio Scimone, Muhai Tang, and Lawrence Foster. In September 2012, the orchestra announced the appointment of Paul McCreesh as its next principal conductor and artistic adviser, with an initial contract of 4 years. McCreesh formally assumed the principal conductorship with the 2013–2014 season, and held the post through 2016. Claudio Scimone, the orchestra's principal conductor from 1979 to 1986, now has the title of Honorary Conductor with the orchestra. Past principal guest conductors have included Joana Carneiro. In May 2013, the orchestra named Susanna Mälkki as its next principal guest conductor, with an initial contract of 3 years, effective July 2013.

In January 2017, Lorenzo Viotti first guest-conducted the orchestra, and returned in the same season for a second guest-conducting appearance. In October 2017, the orchestra announced the appointment of Viotti as its next music director, effective with the 2018–2019 season, with an initial contract of 3 seasons. Viotti stood down as music director in 2021 and now has the title of principal guest conductor with the orchestra. In November 2022, the orchestra announced the appointment of Hannu Lintu as its next chief conductor, effective with the 2023–2024 season. In May 2026, the orchestra has extended the contract of Lintu until 2030.

== Principal conductors ==
- Lamberto Baldi (1962–1963)
- Urs Voegelin (1963–1964)
- Renato Ruotolo (1964–1965)
- Trajan Popesco (1965–1966)
- Adrian Sunshine (1966–1967)
- Gianfranco Rivoli (1967–1971)
- Werner Andreas Albert (1971–1973)
- Michel Tabachnik (1973–1976)
- Juan Pablo Izquierdo (1976–1979)
- Claudio Scimone (1979–1986)
- Muhai Tang (1988–2001)
- Lawrence Foster (2002–2013)
- Paul McCreesh (2013–2016)
- Lorenzo Viotti (2018–2021)
- Hannu Lintu (2023–present)

== Recordings ==
The orchestra has commercially recorded for several labels, including Teldec and Virgin Classics.

- Giuseppe Verdi – Otello. Nikolai Schukoff, Melody Moore, Lester Lynch, Kevin Short, Lawrence Foster, Gulbenkian Orchestra. PENTATONE PTC 5186562 (2017)
- Gordon Getty – Usher House. Etienne Dupuis, Phillip Ens, Lisa Delan, Christian Elsner, Lawrence Foster, Benedict Cumberbatch, Gulbenkian Orchestra. PENTATONE PTC 5186451 (2013)
- Max Bruch – Korngold Violin Concertos & Chausson Poème. Arabella Steinbacher, Lawrence Foster, Gulbenkian Orchestra. PENTATONE PTC 5186503 (2013)
- Sergei Rachmaninov & Edvard Grieg – Piano Concertos. Sa Chen, Lawrence Foster, Gulbenkian Orchestra. PENTATONE PTC 5186444 (2011)
- Zoltán Kodály, Béla Bartók & György Ligeti – Orchestral Works. Lawrence Foster, Mihaela Costea, Esther Georgie, Cyril Dupuy, Jonathan Luxton, Kenneth Best, Gulbenkian Orchestra.
- Antonio Salieri – Requiem in C minor, Ludwig van Beethoven – Meeresstille und Glückliche Fahrt, Franz Schubert – Intende voci. Lawrence Foster, Coro Gulbenkian, Gulbenkian Orchestra. PENTATONE PTC 5186359 (2010).
- Frédéric Chopin – The 2 Piano Concertos. Sa Chen, Lawrence Foster, Gulbenkian Orchestra. PENTATONE PTC 5186341 (2008)
