= Sa Chen =

Chinese pianist

Sa Chen (simplified Chinese: 陈萨; traditional Chinese: 陳薩; pinyin: Chén Sà; born 21 November 1979) is a Chinese pianist. She won first prize in the 1994 China International Piano Competition, fourth place in the XIV International Chopin Piano Competition in 2000, fourth place in the 1996 Leeds International Piano Competition, and third place in the 2005 Van Cliburn International Piano Competition.

== Biography ==
Both of Chen's parents were members of an art troupe in the People's Liberation Army, and later transferred to the Performing Arts Group of Chongqing City. Her father played the French horn, and her mother was a ballet dancer.

She began to study the violin at the age of five, but soon switched to piano. Her first piano teacher was Dan Zhaoyi, who also taught Yundi Li and Zee Zee. Later, she pursued further studies with Joan Havill at the Guildhall School of Music and Drama. She also received coaching from Fou Ts'ong for a period after the 1996 Leeds Piano Competition.

Chen has performed with conductors Sir Simon Rattle, Leonard Slatkin, Yu Long and Edo de Waart among others. Musicians she has performed with include Lin Choliang, Gidon Kremer and Nicolai Znaider.

She was a member of the jury of the XVIII International Chopin Piano Competition in 2021 and XIX International Chopin Piano Competition in 2025.

== Discography ==
Chen Sa recorded her first studio album Chopin Impression for JVC in 2001, and later the Chopin complete Waltzes for IMC in Japan in 2006. Harmonia Mundi released her live performance recording from the Van Cliburn competition worldwide in 2005. Her albums with PENTATONE include Chopin: The 2 Piano Concertos and Russian Solo Compositions released in 2008 and 2009 respectively. Classical FM selected her Chopin Album as the "Best CD of the Month" for her "soulful performance". The concerto album, Rachmaninov's Concerto No.2 and Grieg's Piano Concerto was released in 2011. Her latest album "Memories Lost" featuring modern Chinese compositions has been released worldwide by BIS record in January 2015, described as "the most interesting and successful recording of new Chinese music.." by BBC Music Magazine.

- Rachmaninov & Grieg - Piano Concertos Sa Chen, Lawrence Foster, Gulbenkian Orchestra. PENTATONE PTC 5186444 (2011).
- Rachmaninov - 6 Etudes Tableaux & Mussorgsky - Pictures at an Exhibition & A Night on Bald Mountain. PENTATONE PTC 5186355 (2009).
- Frédéric Chopin - The 2 Piano Concertos. Sa Chen, Lawrence Foster, Gulbenkian Orchestra. PENTATONE PTC 5186341 (2008).
