= Carrapatoso =

Carrapatoso is a Portuguese surname. Notable people with the surname include:

- Eurico Carrapatoso (born 1962), Portuguese composer
- Ruben Carrapatoso (born 1981), Brazilian racing driver
