= Luc Héry =

French violinist

Luc Héry (born 13 August 1961) is a French classical violinist.

== Biography ==
Héry studied the violin with Pierre Doukan and chamber music with Jean Hubeau at the Conservatoire de Paris, where he won a first prize in these two disciplines before entering the third cycle in 1980.

After a third prize at the Festival international de musique Tibor Varga in 1983, he was hired by the Orchestre de l'Opéra national de Paris in 1985 then by the Orchestre national de France in 1986 when he was chief of attack for the second violon. He left the "National" in 1990 to return to it in 1992 as soloist concertmaster, after two years with the Orchestre de Paris in the same concertmaster position. He shared this function with Sarah Nemtanu.

At the same time, he pursued a career as a chamber musician and a soloist, performing with the Orchestre national de France, in particular Henri Dutilleux's Concerto for violin (direction Lawrence Foster) in 1996 and Mozart's Sinfonia Concertante for Violin, Viola and Orchestra (direction Yevgeny Svetlanov) in 2000. He has also recorded Brahm's Clarinet Quintet and Mozart's Clarinet Quintet with the soloists of the Orchestra.

He has been teaching since 1993 as an assistant in Olivier Charlier's class at the Conservatoire de Paris and is also in charge of the preparation department at the string instruments orchestra and the formation of solo violins at the Conservatoire à Rayonnement Régional de Paris.

Héry is also a sponsor of the Tournesol, Artistes à l'Hôpital association.
