= Wildner =

Wildner is a surname. Notable people with the surname include:

- Johannes Wildner (born 1956), Austrian conductor, professor, and violinist
- Martina Wildner (born 1968, Allgäu), German female writer
- Wander Wildner (born 1959), Venâncio Aires), Punk rock singer from the South of Brazil.
