= Asher Fisch =

Israeli conductor

- אשר פיש
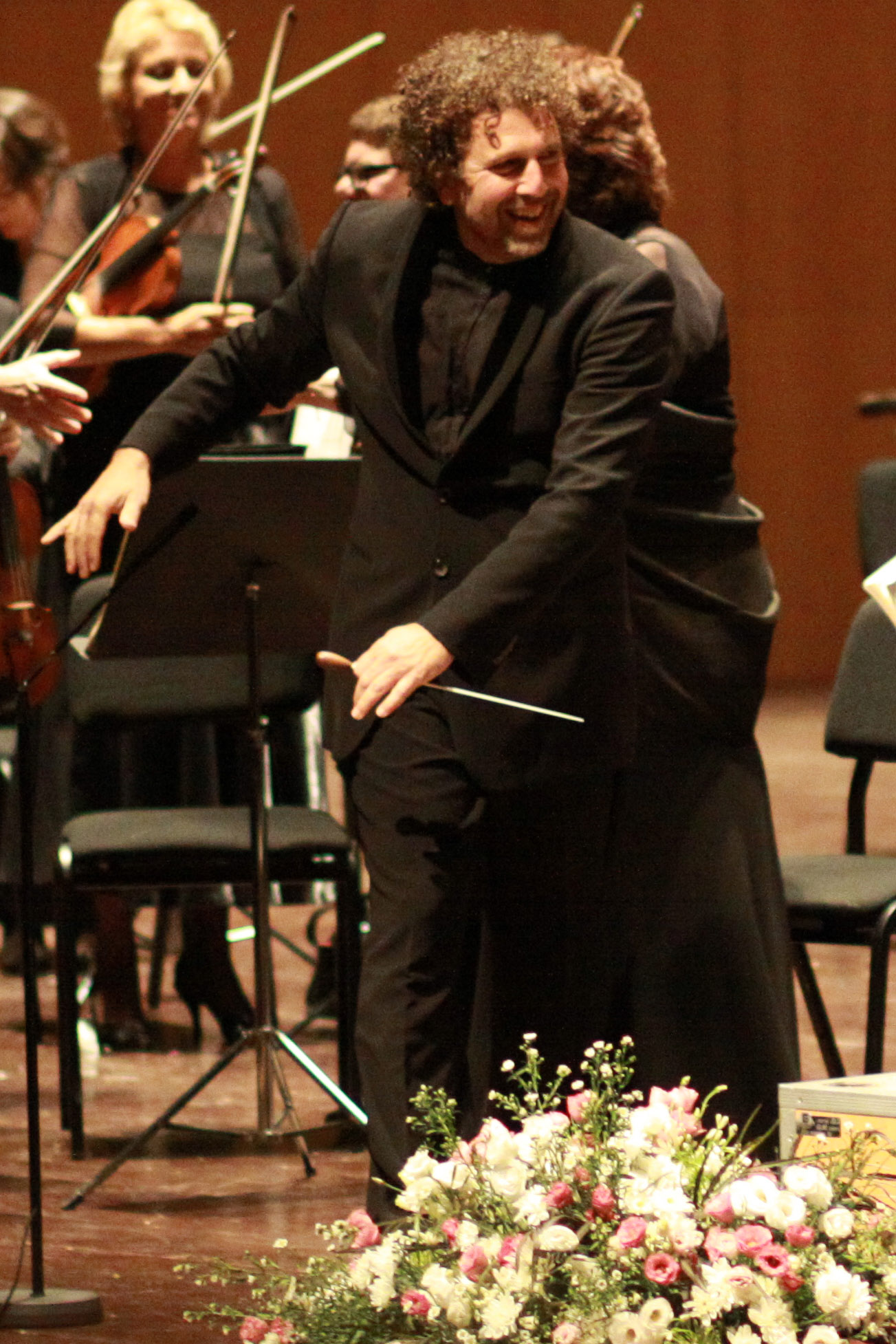
- Born: 1958 (age 67–68); Jerusalem, Israel
- Occupations: conductor, pianist

Asher Fisch (Hebrew: אשר פיש; born May 19, 1958, Jerusalem, Israel) is an Israeli conductor and pianist.

Fisch began his career as an assistant of Daniel Barenboim and an associate conductor of the Berlin State Opera. He made his United States debut in 1995, conducting Der fliegende Holländer at the Los Angeles Opera. He was chief conductor of the Vienna Volksoper from 1995 to 2000. He served as music director of Israeli Opera from 1998 to 2008. Seattle Opera named him its principal guest conductor in October 2007.

Fisch first guest-conducted the West Australian Symphony Orchestra (WASO) in 1999. In May 2012, WASO announced the appointment of Fisch as its next principal conductor, effective 1 January 2014, with an initial contract of 3 years. In September 2015, the WASO announced the extension of Fisch's contract until the end of 2019. With the WASO, Fisch has recorded the symphonies of Brahms.

== Selected discography ==
- Wagner – Der Ring Des Nibelungen
  - State Opera of South Australia: Melba Recordings – Das Rheingold (MR301089–90), Die Walküre (MR301091–94), Siegfried (MR301095–98), Götterdämmerung (MR301099–102)
  - Seattle Opera: Avie AV2313
- Gordon Getty – The Little Match Girl. Nikolai Schukoff, Lester Lynch, Melody Moore, Asher Fisch, Ulf Schirmer, Münchner Rundfunkorchester, Chor des Bayerischen Rundfunks. PENTATONE PTC 5186480 (2015)

== Awards and nominations ==
=== ARIA Music Awards ===
The ARIA Music Awards is an annual awards ceremony held by the Australian Recording Industry Association. They commenced in 1987.

Year	Nominee / work	Award	Result	Ref.
2007	Wagner: Das Rheingold (with State Opera of South Australia & Adelaide Symphony Orchestra)	Best Classical Album	Nominated	
