= Esther Yoo =

American violinist (born 1994)

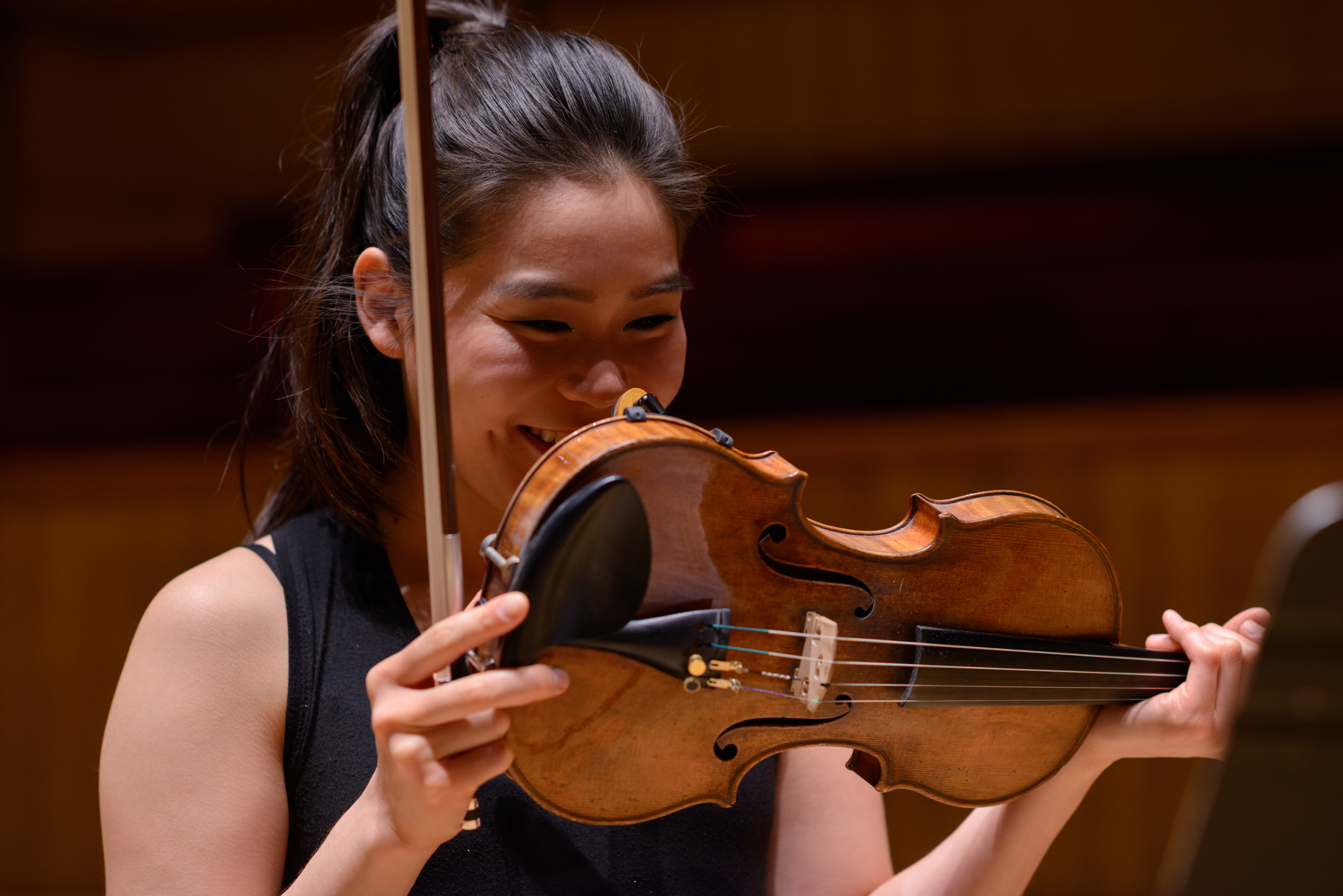
- Esther Yoo

Background information
- Born: 11 June 1994 (age 31); United States
- Genres: Classical
- Occupations: Violinist
- Years active: Since 2010
- Website: estheryooviolin.com

Esther Yoo (born 11 June 1994) is an American violinist.

== Early life and education ==
Born in the United States and raised in Europe, Yoo began playing the violin at the age of 4 and made her concert debut aged 8. She attended the International School of Brussels, prior to becoming a student of Ana Chumachenco in the Excellence Bachelor Programme at the Hochschule für Musik und Theater München, Augustin Dumay in the Artist Diploma Programme at the Queen Elisabeth Music Chapel, Zakhar Bron, Leonid Kerbel and Berent Korfker.

Yoo plays the 1704 "Prince Obolensky" Stradivarius, lent to her by a private collector.

== Career ==
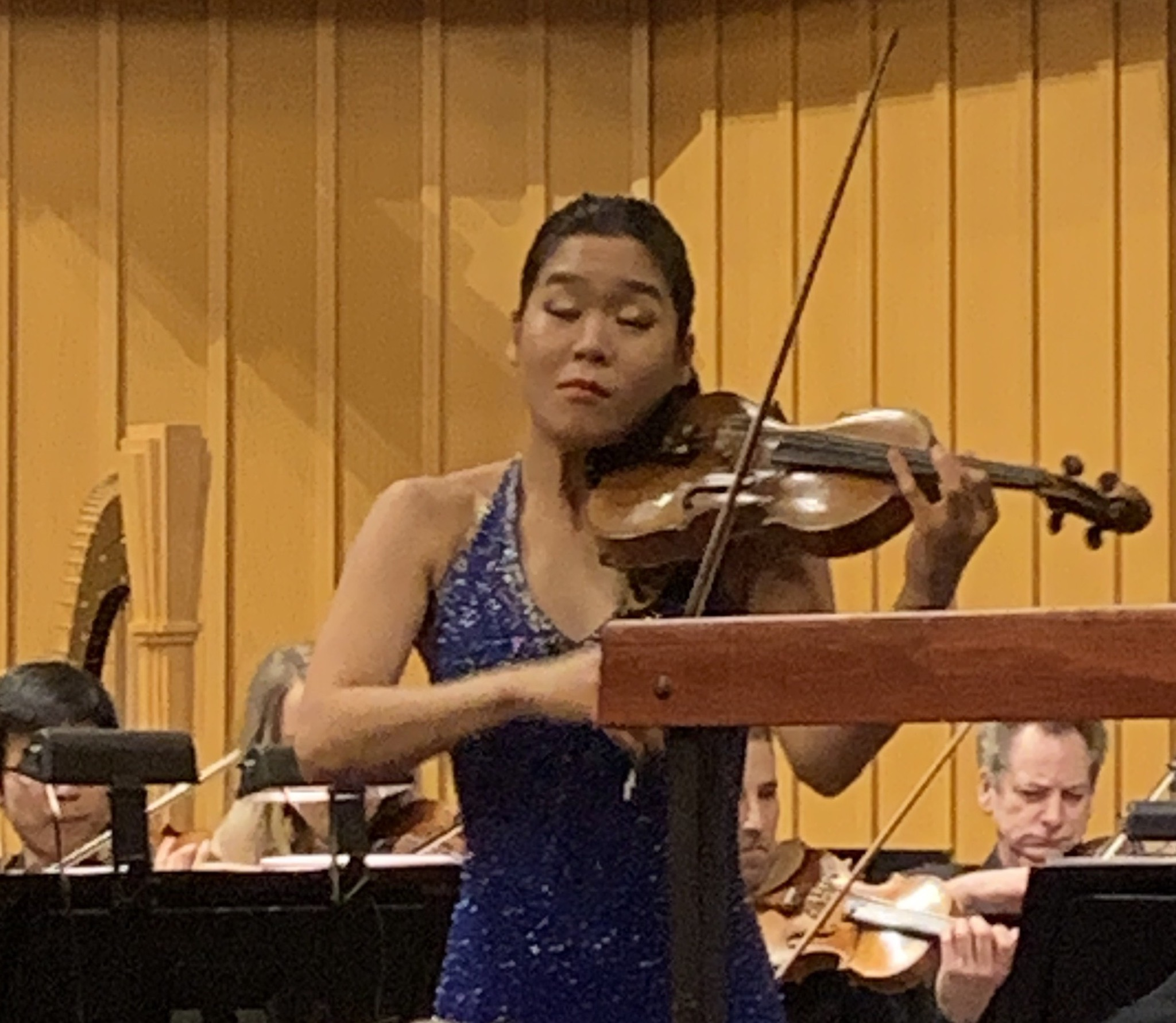
Yoo playing with ProMusica Chamber Orchestra, Columbus, Ohio, 2020

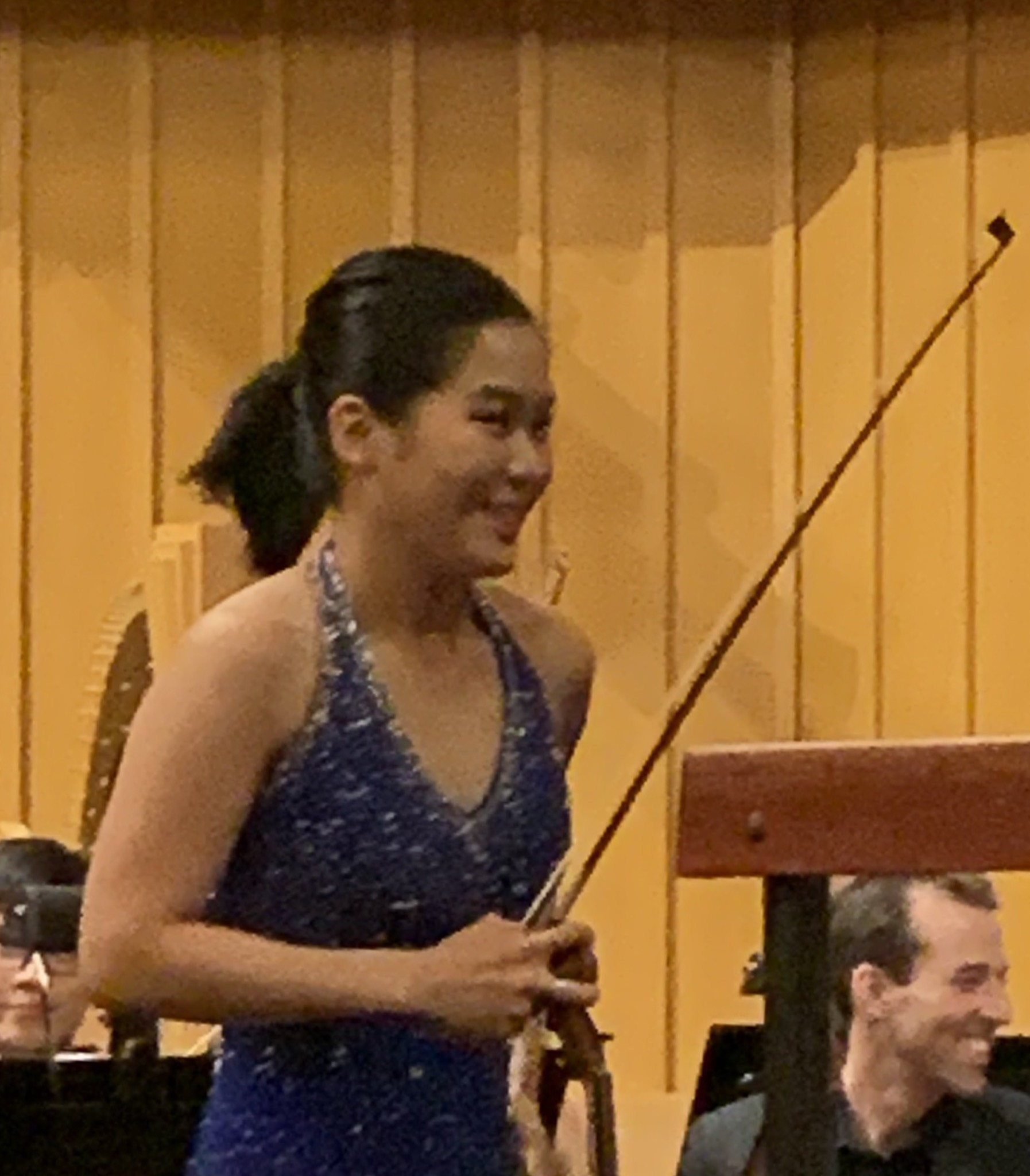
Yoo in 2020

Yoo first came to international attention in 2010 when she became the youngest prizewinner of the 10th International International Jean Sibelius Violin Competition at age 16. In 2012 she was one of the youngest ever prizewinners of the Queen Elisabeth Competition, and from 2014 to 2016 she was a BBC Radio 3 New Generation Artist. She was the Royal Philharmonic Orchestra's first ever artist-in-residence, and was listed as one of Classic FM's Top 30 Artists under 30 in 2018.

Yoo has performed with ensembles including Belgian National Orchestra, Royal Bangkok Symphony Orchestra, Royal Scottish National Orchestra, Vancouver Symphony Orchestra, Copenhagen Philharmonic, Hong Kong Philharmonic Orchestra, Philharmonia Orchestra, Minnesota Orchestra, Deutsche Radio Philharmonic, the BBC orchestras, and the symphony orchestras of Toronto, Charlotte, Iceland and Gävle. In 2017/18, Yoo was artist-in-residence with the Cambridge Corn Exchange. On 20 March 2024 Yoo, with the BBC Symphony Orchestra, performed the world premiere of Raymond Yiu's Violin Concerto, which was composed specially for her.

As a chamber musician, Yoo has appeared in solo recital at Lincoln Center, Wigmore Hall, Oslo Opera House, and Centre for Fine Arts, Brussels and, as a member of the Z.E.N. Trio (with former BBC Radio 3 New Generation Artists Zhang Zuo and Narek Hakhnazaryan), at Aspen Music Festival, Ottawa Chamberfest and in Hong Kong, Liverpool, and Cambridge. The trio first played in Australia with a national tour in 2022 for Musica Viva.

On her YouTube channel, Yoo hosts videos on violin technique and practice tips, cooking, life as a touring artist, the making of her albums with Deutsche Grammophon and Decca, and more. In 2021, she launched the video series "Artist Confidential" inviting artists to reflect on what it means to be a musician today.

== Awards and prizes ==
In 2006, Yoo was given first prize in the junior section of the International Henryk Wieniawski Violin Competition and also the European Union Award for Music Art for Youth. She then went on to be the youngest prizewinner of the 10th International Jean Sibelius Violin Competition in 2010 at the age of 16. Then in 2012 Yoo was one of the youngest ever prizewinners of the Queen Elisabeth Competition.

In 2014 Yoo was named as a BBC New Generation Artist for 2014–16.

In 2020, Yoo was named one of twenty notable musicians to watch in 2020 by WQXR-FM.

== Recordings ==
- Sibelius + Glazunov Violin Concertos – Esther Yoo, Vladimir Ashkenazy and Philharmonia Orchestra (Deutsche Grammophon, 2015)
- Tchaikovsky – Esther Yoo, Vladimir Ashkenazy and Philharmonia Orchestra (Deutsche Grammophon, 2017)
- Brahms & Dvorak Piano Trios – Z.E.N. Trio – Zhang Zuo, Esther Yoo and Narek Hakhnazaryan (Deutsche Grammophon, 2017)
- Original Soundtrack of On Chesil Beach – Esther Yoo & BBC National Orchestra of Wales (Decca Classics, 2018)
- Burning Through the Cold – Z.E.N. Trio – Zhang Zuo, Esther Yoo and Narek Hakhnazaryan (Deutsche Grammophon, 2020)
- Barber, Bruch with Vasily Petrenko, Royal Philharmonic Orchestra (Deutsche Grammophon, 2023)
- Love Symposium with Long Yu, Royal Philharmonic Orchestra (Deutsche Grammophon, 2026)
