= Sarah Nemtanu =

Franco-Romanian classical violinist

Sarah Nemtanu (born 1981) is a Franco-Romanian classical violinist.

== Biography ==
Nemtanu started studying the violin with her father, Vladimir Nemtanu, solo concertmaster of the Orchestre National Bordeaux Aquitaine. She then studied at the Conservatoire de Bordeaux, unanimously obtaining a gold medal in violin and in chamber music. She entered the Conservatoire de Paris in 1997, where she studied with Gérard Poulet and Pierre-Laurent Aimard. She won the first prize of the Maurice Ravel competition at Saint-Jean-de-Luz in 1998 and the third prize at the International Stradivarius Competition in 2001.

Since 2002 she has been sharing with Luc Héry the position of concertmaster of the Orchestre national de France with whom she also performs as soloist. This situation led her to be invited by famous conductors such as Bernard Haitink, Colin Davis and Riccardo Muti. In January 2026 she was appointed to the position of concertmaster of the Orchestre de Paris.

In 2009, her recording of Tchaikovsky's Violon Concerto is used for the film Le Concert, and she tutored the actress playing the violin soloist.

== Selected discography ==
- Gypsic (Naïve Records, 2010), in collaboration with Chilly Gonzales.
- Martinu - Double Concertos. Lawrence Foster, Mari Kodama, Momo Kodama, Deborah Nemtanu, Magali Demesse, Orchestre Philharmonique de Marseille. PENTATONE PTC 5186658 (2018).
