= Dan Atanasiu =

Romanian pianist (born 1955)

Dan Atanasiu (born 2 December 1955) is a Romanian pianist who has twice been awarded prizes at the Frederic Chopin International Piano Competition.

== Biography ==
Originally from Timișoara, he started learning piano at the age of 5 and made his debut in 1968 in Bucharest.

He graduated from the National University of Music in Bucharest in piano class. His professors were Ana Pitis and Ioana Minei. He also studied in Prague.

In 1978, he won first prize in the Bordeaux Piano Competition. In 1981 he took third place in the Épinal International Piano Competition. In 1975 and 1980, he was a semi-finalist in the 9th and 10th International Chopin Piano Competition, winning the honorable mention of the Minister of Culture and the Arts. In 1983 he won third prize in the Dino Ciani Competition for Young Pianists, and in 1984 fifth prize in the Montreal International Music Competition.

From 1980 to 1993 he was a soloist with the George Enescu Philharmonic.

He recorded albums for Electrecord and Polskie Nagrania, and also had radio recordings for radio stations in Romania, Poland and France.

Shortly after emigrating to Canada he was diagnosed with focal dystonia, which affected his right hand and prevented him from performing. He then concentrated on his teaching work. He is on the jury of piano competitions, such as the George Enescu Festival in 2018.

== Trivia ==
He was due to perform in Toronto in December 1996, which was not possible, however, as he slipped on a banana peel and suffered an injury.
