= Françoise Thinat =

French pianist

Françoise Thinat (born in 1934) in Gien (Loiret), is a French classical pianist.

She presides over the Orléans International Piano Competition, which she founded in 1994 and teaches at the École normale de musique de Paris.

== Biography ==
First prize in interpretation in the classes of Yvonne Lefébure and Germaine Mounier at the Conservatoire de Paris, Thinat has also taken interpretation courses from Marguerite Long, Georges Tzipine, Louis Fourestier and Guido Agosti at Siena. She has performed in concerts in Europe, the United States, Canada, Japan and Korea, and has given interpretation courses abroad.

Thinat is the founder of the Orléans International Piano Competition in 1994. This internationally renowned biennial competition showcases the piano heritage from the 20th century to the present day. Supported by many patronages and cultural associations, this competition has revealed young artists. For several decades, she has also directed the concert series entitled Matinées de piano and given at the Orléans Institute.

Among her many educational activities, let us quote her participation in the writing of "10 years with the piano" (Cité de la musique); Thinat is also the initiator or the inspiration for several musical events: the Déodat de Séverac piano training course at Saint-Félix-Lauragais, the piano workshop July in Orléans, the cello festival August in Orléans.

She has taught at the Toulouse Conservatory, the Orléans Conservatory and is currently a professor at the École normale de musique de Paris.

Thinat is a member of several national and international juries. She has received the Music Education Award offered by French music publishers and has been appointed Officer of the Ordre des Arts et des Lettres, promotion January 2016.

== Recordings ==
For the Arion label Thinat has recorded:

- Guy Ropartz: ouverture, variations et final; musique au jardin; nocturne
- Claude Debussy: La mer, Images pour orchestre, gigues, rondes de printemps, with Jacques Bernier
- Paul Dukas: Grande sonate, en mi bémol mineur
- Robert Schumann: Album for the Young
- Edvard Grieg: album La Norvège d'Edvard Grieg.

Other labels:

- Déodat de Séverac: Cerdaña, En Languedoc, Les Naïades et le Faune Indiscret (reissued in 2014 at Tessitures - Satine).

== Prizes ==
Thinat has obtained several prizes:

- First Grand Prize at the Maria Canals International Music Competition in Barcelone
- First Grand Prize of the "Marguerite Long Academy"
- Laureate of the Marguerite Long and Geneva competitions
- Music education prize offered by French music publishers
- Officer of the Ordre des Arts et des Lettres, promotion January 2016
