= Kent Nagano =

American conductor and opera administrator

Kent George Nagano OC, GOQ, MSM
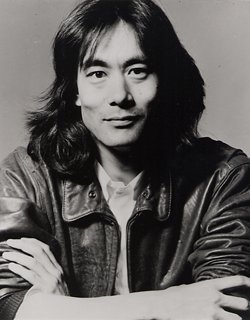
- Born: November 22, 1951 (age 74); Berkeley, California, U.S.
- Occupation: Conductor
- Website: www.kentnagano.com

Kent George Nagano (born November 22, 1951) is an American conductor and opera administrator. From 2015 until 2025, he was Generalmusikdirektor (GMD) of the Hamburg State Opera and the Philharmonisches Staatsorchester Hamburg.

== Early life and education ==
Nagano was born in Berkeley, California, while his parents were in graduate school at the University of California, Berkeley. He is a sansei (third-generation) Japanese-American.

He grew up in Morro Bay, a city on the Central Coast of California in San Luis Obispo County where he learned to play the piano, viola, and clarinet. He later studied sociology and music at the University of California, Santa Cruz. After graduation, he moved to San Francisco State University to study music, taking composition courses from Grosvenor Cooper and Roger Nixon. He also studied at the École Normale de Musique de Paris.

== Career ==
Nagano's first conducting job was with the Opera Company of Boston, where he was assistant conductor to Sarah Caldwell. In 1978, he became the conductor of the Berkeley Symphony, his first music directorship. He stepped down from this position in 2009. During his tenure in Berkeley, Nagano became a champion of the music of Olivier Messiaen and initiated a correspondence with him. He was later invited to work with Messiaen on the final stages of his opera Saint François d'Assise in Paris, where he lived with Messiaen and his wife Yvonne Loriod, whom he came to regard as his "European parents".

In 1983, Nagano conducted the London Symphony Orchestra in several of Frank Zappa's completely orchestral compositions for the first time. Nagano recorded several of Zappa's pieces on the issue London Symphony Orchestra, Vol. 1, where Zappa had personally chosen Nagano to conduct the orchestra. Nagano described this as "my first chance, my first real break". In 1984, while assistant conductor of the Boston Symphony Orchestra, he stepped in for Seiji Ozawa on short notice and without rehearsal, receiving acclaim from the audience, orchestra, and Boston Globe critic Richard Dyer for a "noble performance" of Mahler's Ninth Symphony.

Beginning in 1985, Nagano was the music director of the Ojai Music Festival four separate times, the last in 2004, and once alongside Stephen Mosko in 1986.

Nagano has a long history of inventive programming, particularly in the chamber music repertoire. He collaborated with Icelandic artist Björk at the 1996 Verbier Festival performing Arnold Schoenberg's Pierrot Lunaire.

=== Lyon and Manchester ===
Nagano was music director of the Opéra National de Lyon from 1988 to 1998, where he recorded, with the Lyon National Opera Orchestra and chorus, numerous works including Busoni's Doktor Faust, Arlecchino and Turandot, Prokofiev's L'amour des trois oranges, Stravinsky's The Rake's Progress, Offenbach's The Tales of Hoffmann, the premiere of Debussy's Rodrigue et Chimène, Canteloube's Chants d'Auvergne, Berlioz's La damnation de Faust, Carlisle Floyd's Susannah, operas by Richard Strauss, the French version of Salomé and the original version of Ariadne auf Naxos, Peter Eötvös' Tri sestry, Massenet's Werther, Delibes' Coppélia, Poulenc's Dialogues of the Carmelites, orchestral works by Maurice Ravel, and Kurt Weill's The Seven Deadly Sins.

Nagano served as principal conductor of the Hallé Orchestra in Manchester from 1992 to 1999. During his tenure, Nagano received criticism for his expensive and ambitious programming, as well as his conducting fees. However, poor financial management at the orchestra separately contributed to the fiscal troubles of the orchestra. His contract was not renewed after 1999.

=== Berlin and Los Angeles ===
Nagano became principal conductor and artistic director of the Deutsches Symphonie-Orchester Berlin in 2000, and served in this position until 2006. He made a number of recordings with the orchestra, including music by Ludwig van Beethoven, Arnold Schoenberg, Anton Bruckner, Alexander von Zemlinsky, and Gustav Mahler.

Nagano became principal conductor of the Los Angeles Opera (LA Opera) with the 2001–2002 season. In May 2003, Nagano was named the LA Opera's first music director, and he retained this position through 2006.

Nagano is the president of the European Opera Centre, Liverpool.

=== Montreal and Munich ===
He has been a regular guest at the Salzburg Festival, where he premiered Kaija Saariaho's L'amour de loin in 2000. He also conducted the world premiere of John Adams' The Death of Klinghoffer at la Monnaie in Brussels.

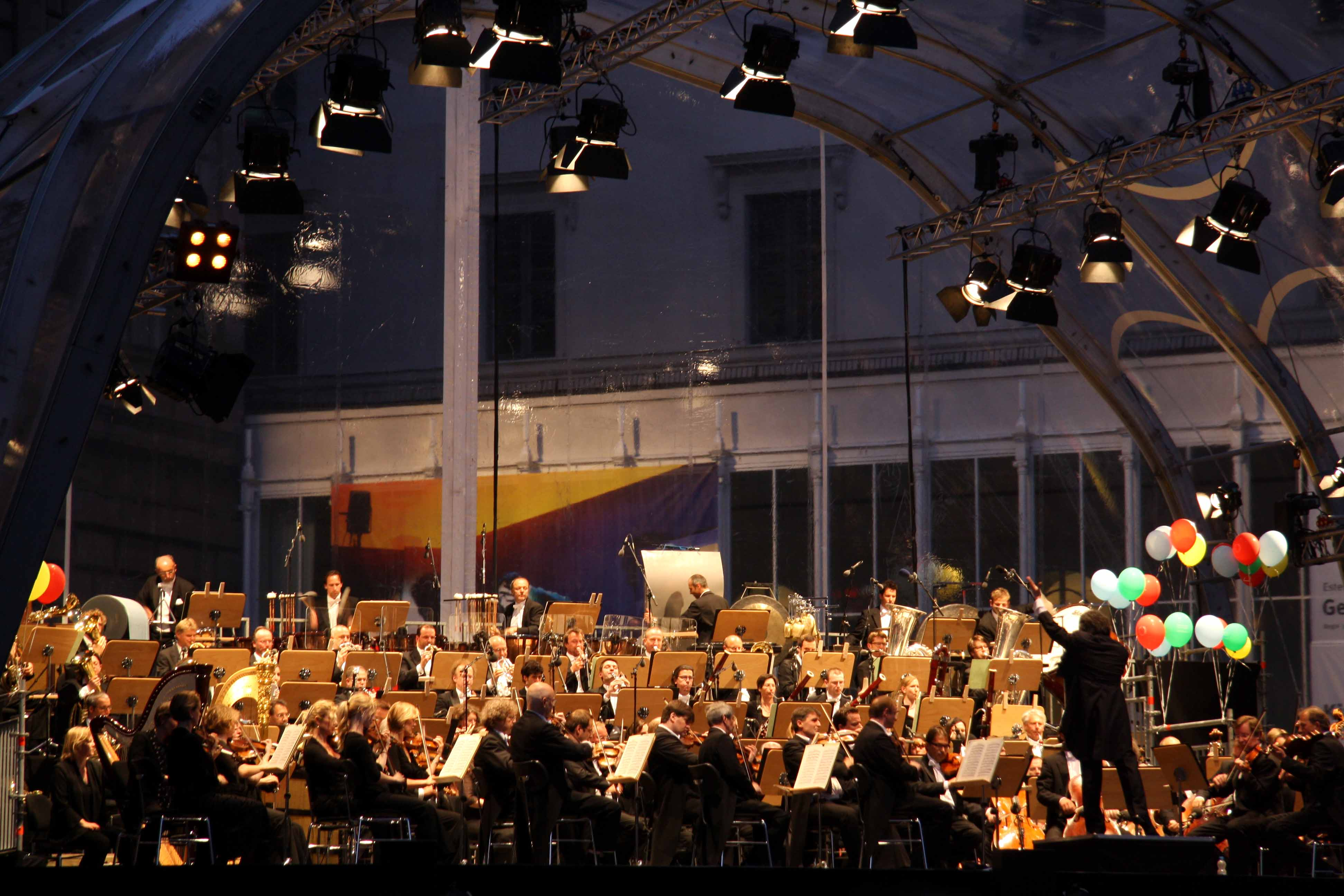
In Oper für Alle, Munich, 2010

In 2006, Nagano became both the music director of the Montreal Symphony Orchestra (OSM) and GMD of the Bavarian State Opera. His contract with the Bavarian State Opera did not allow him to be the music director of another opera company. He concluded his Bavarian State Opera tenure in 2013. With the OSM, he has conducted commercial recordings for such labels as ECM New Series. Nagano concluded his OSM tenure at the end of the 2019–2020 season.

=== Hamburg and Madrid ===
Nagano has served as one of the Russian National Orchestra's Conductor Collegium. In August 2012, the Gothenburg Symphony Orchestra announced the appointment of Nagano as its principal guest conductor and artistic advisor, as of the 2013–2014 season, with an initial contract of 3 years. In September 2012, the Hamburg State Opera announced the appointment of Nagano as its next Generalmusikdirektor (General Music Director) and Chefdirigent (chief conductor), effective with the 2015–2016 season, with an initial contract through the 2019–2020 season. In October 2017, the company announced the extension of Nagano's Hamburg contract through 2025. In 2017, he conducted Jörg Widmann's Arche at the opening of the Elbphilharmonie. Nagano is scheduled to conclude his Hamburg State Opera tenure as GMD at the close of the 2024–2025 season.

Nagano first guest-conducted the Spanish National Orchestra (Orquesta Nacional de España) in April 2021. He returned for subsequent guest-conducting appearances in June 2021 and April 2024. In December 2024, the Orquesta y Coro Nacionales de España announced the appointment of Nagano as its next Director Artístico (Artistic Director) and Director Títular (Chief Conductor), effective with the 2026–2027 season, with an initial contract of five seasons.

=== Parma ===
Since 2025, he serves as Principal Artistic Partner of the Filarmonica Arturo Toscanini in Parma, establishing a distinguished artistic collaboration under a three-year agreement that begins with the 2025/2026 season.

== Personal life ==
Nagano is married to pianist Mari Kodama. The couple has one daughter, Karin Kei Nagano. He resides in Montreal and San Francisco.

== Honours ==
=== Awards ===
- Seaver/National Endowment for the Arts Conductors Award, 1985
- Order of the Rising Sun, Gold Rays with Rosette, 2008
- Wilhelm Furtwängler Prize, Beethovenfest Bonn, 2010
- Meritorious Service Medal – Invested on: May 24, 2018.
- Honorary Grand Officer of the National Order of Québec, in 2013 (however, part of the 2014 list)
- Honorary conductor Philharmonisches Staatsorchester Hamburg, 2023
- Officer of the Order of Canada, 2024
- Order of Merit of the Federal Republic of Germany, 2024
- Brahms-Preis, 2024

=== Honorary doctorates ===
- McGill University in Montréal
- Université de Montréal
- San Francisco State University

=== Memberships ===
In October 2020, Nagano was elected as a member of the Royal Swedish Academy of Music in consideration of "his eminent merits in the musical art".

== Selected discography ==
- Widmann: Arche. Marlis Petersen, Thomas E. Bauer, Iveta Apkalna, Kent Nagano, Philharmonisches Staatsorchester Hamburg. ECM 2605 (2018)
- Beethoven: Nine Symphonies – 'O Mensch, gib acht! Entre les Lumières et la Révolution'. Montreal Symphony Orchestra. Analekta
- Beethoven: Piano Concertos Nos 4 and 5. Till Fellner, piano; Montreal Symphony Orchestra. ECM 2114
- Arthur Honegger and Jacques Ibert: L'Aiglon. Decca
- Prokofiev: Peter and the Wolf. Jean-Pascal Beintus: Wolf Tracks. Mikhail Gorbachev, Bill Clinton, Kent Nagano, Sophia Loren, Russian National Orchestra. PENTATONE PTC 5186011 (2003).
- Saint-Saëns, Samy Moussa, Kaija Saariaho: 'Symphonie et créations avec orgue'. Olivier Latry, Jean-Willy Kunz, organists; Montreal Symphony Orchestra. Analekta
- Tchaikovsky: Violin Concerto & Piano Concerto. Christian Tetzlaff, Nikolai Lugansky, Kent Nagano, Russian National Orchestra. PENTATONE PTC 5186022 (2003)
- Chopin, Carl Loewe: Piano Concertos. Mari Kodama, Kent Nagano, Russian National Orchestra. PENTATONE PTC 5186026 (2003)
- Bruckner: Symphony No 3. Deutsches Symphonie-Orchester Berlin, Kent Nagano. Harmonia Mundi 801817 (2003)
- Mahler: Symphony No 8. Deutsches Symphonie-Orchester Berlin, Kent Nagano, Sally Matthews, Sylvia Greenberg, Lynne Dawson, Elena Manistina, Sophie Koch, Robert Gambill, Detlef Roth, Jan-Hendrik Rootering. Harmonia Mundi 801858/59 (2004)
- Saint-Saëns, Andrew Wan, violin, Complete Violin Concertos (n°1, n°2, n°3), Orchestre symphonique de Montréal, conductor Kent Nagano. CD Analekta 2015
- Ginastera: Violin Concerto, Bernstein: Sérénade, Moussa: Concerto "Adrano", Andrew Wan, violin, Orchestre symphonique de Montréal, conductor Kent Nagano. CD Analekta 2019

Cultural offices
Preceded by Thomas Rarick	Music Director, Berkeley Symphony; 1978–2009	Succeeded by Joana Carneiro
Preceded by John Eliot Gardiner	Music Director, Opéra National de Lyon; 1988–1998	Succeeded by Louis Langrée
Preceded by Vladimir Ashkenazy	Principal Conductor, Deutsches Symphonie-Orchester Berlin; 2000–2006	Succeeded by Ingo Metzmacher
Preceded by no predecessor	Principal Conductor and Music Director, Los Angeles Opera; 2001–2006	Succeeded by James Conlon
Preceded by Simone Young	Generalmusikdirektor, Hamburg State Opera; 2015–2025	Succeeded by Omer Meir Wellber
