= The Merchant of Venice (opera) =

Opera by André Tchaikowsky

André Tchaikowsky as a young man

The Merchant of Venice is an opera by André Tchaikowsky (1935–1982) to a libretto, based on the Shakespeare play, by John O'Brien. Written between 1968 and 1982, it was first performed in 2013 at the Bregenz Festival. The British premiere was presented by the Welsh National Opera in September 2016.

== Background ==
Tchaikowsky, who was based in England after the 1950s, was a great admirer of Shakespeare, and was able to recite large stretches of his works from memory. His compositions include settings of seven of Shakespeare's Sonnets, songs from The Tempest, and incidental music for Hamlet. In his will he left his skull to the Royal Shakespeare Company for use in productions of Hamlet.

Tchaikowsky met the theatre director John O'Brien in 1968 and they agreed to attempt an opera on The Merchant. O'Brien has noted "At first it seemed odd that [Tchaikowsky], as a Jew, would want to take Shylock on, particularly at a time when there was a feeling that Shakespeare was anti-Semitic, which is a nonsensical thing anyway." Most of the opera was written by 1978, and following discussions with the music critic Hans Keller, Tchaikowsky decided to submit it for consideration to English National Opera, then under the directorship of Lord Harewood. A playthrough of the first two acts was arranged in December 1981, with Harewood and the ENO artistic director David Pountney and conductor Mark Elder in attendance. But in March 1982 Tchaikowsky received a letter from Harewood turning the opera down. By this time Tchaikowsky was already seriously ill, and he died only three months later. His dying wish was that the opera be performed.

Although the opera was almost forgotten after Tchaikowsky's death, the opportunity for its premiere arose at the Bregenz Festival where Pountney was artistic director in 2013. Keith Warner directed the production, which was also supported by the Adam Mickiewicz Institute and the Grand Theatre – National Opera, Warsaw.

== Roles ==
Role	Voice type	Premiere cast, 18 July 2013 Conductor: Erik Nielsen	British premiere cast, 16 September 2016 Conductor: Lionel Friend
Duke of Venice	bass	Richard Angas	Miklós Sebestyén
Antonio	counter-tenor	Christopher Ainslie	Martin Wölfel
Bassanio	tenor	Charles Workman	Marc Le Brocq
Gratiano	baritone	David Stout	David Stout
Lorenzo	tenor	Jason Bridges	Bruce Sledge
Shylock	baritone	Adrian Eröd	Lester Lynch
Salerio	baritone	Adrian Clarke	Simon Thorpe
Solanio	bass-baritone	Norman Patzke	Gary Griffiths
Jessica	soprano	Kathryn Lewek	Lauren Michelle
Portia	soprano	Magdalena Anna Hofmann	Sarah Castle
Nerissa	mezzo-soprano	Verena Gunz	Verena Gunz
Prince of Morocco	danced role	Elliot Lebogang Mohlamme	Wade Lewin
Prince of Aragon	danced role	Juliusz Kubiak	Juliusz Kubiak
Chorus: Maskers, Venetians, etc.

== Synopsis ==
The opera libretto follows the plot of the original play very closely, generally using Shakespeare's own words. Many of the minor characters are excised. Act I introduces the melancholy merchant Antonio, his friend Bassanio who asks Antonio for money to back his wooing of Portia, the Jewish moneylender Shylock, his daughter Jessica and her Gentile lover, Lorenzo. Despite evident mutual personal animosity, Shylock agrees to lend Antonio 3000 ducats against the pledge of a pound of the latter's flesh. Lorenzo kidnaps Jessica, together with much of Shylock's wealth. Shylock is taunted by the citizens of Venice. Act II takes place at Portia's residence at Belmont, where Bassanio is able to win her hand after defeating two foreign princes in choosing correctly between three caskets of gold, silver and lead. Act III is set in the Duke's courtroom; Antonio's business ventures seem to have failed, and Shylock claims his pound of flesh. Portia and her servant Nerissa, disguised as lawyers, successfully defend Antonio and force Shylock to forgo his loan, to accept Lorenzo as a son-in-law, and to convert to Christianity. In Act IV, set in Belmont, the various lovers are united, and Antonio – who is still left single – is informed that his ventures have in fact prospered.

== Reception ==
After the successful premiere on 18 July 2013, Pountney was able to say "[Tchaikowsky's] operatic view of Shakespeare was something to be treasured, but in the end it ... met with silence. I was part of that silence. Now I am part of the noise." Amongst the critical reactions, The Sunday Telegraph critic commented that the opera was "darkly lyrical and hard to pin down stylistically" with the music "marvellously responsive to John O'Brien's libretto and Shakespeare's moods". A review in the Financial Times commented that

The results are striking... Warner's staging treads a fine line between harsh cruelty and levity, with a good mix of clarity and complexity... Tchaikowsky's music... defies attribution to any one definite style of 20th-century composition. The score is intricate and dark, with moments of both brutality and lyricism, not to mention flashes of acerbic wit.

== British premiere ==
The Welsh National Opera gave the opera its British premiere in Cardiff on 16 September 2016, using the Bregenz production. The conductor was Lionel Friend, and the role of Shylock was sung by the baritone Lester Lynch. Lynch is an African American and this in the opinion of the critic of The Guardian gave the opera "a further racist edge...[and] a deliberately shocking contemporary resonance."

== Recording ==
The Bregenz production was recorded as a DVD by Unitel Classica in 2014, and issued together with a documentary DVD about the planning and development of the production directed by Mark Charles (Unitel 2072708-1/-2).
