= André Tchaikowsky =

Polish composer and pianist

André Tchaikowsky as a young man

André Tchaikowsky (also Andrzej Czajkowski; born Robert Andrzej Krauthammer; 1 November 1935 – 26 June 1982) was a Polish composer and pianist. In addition to his musical work, he is also notable for bequeathing his skull to the Royal Shakespeare Company for use as Yorick in Hamlet.

== Life and career ==
Robert Andrzej Krauthammer was born in Warsaw in 1935 into a Jewish family. He had shown musical talent from an early age, and his mother, an amateur pianist, taught him the piano from the age of four. When the Second World War broke out, they were moved into the Warsaw Ghetto. Krauthammer remained there until 1942, when he was smuggled out and provided with forged identity papers that renamed him Andrzej Czajkowski. He then went into hiding with his grandmother, Celina. The pair remained hidden until 1944, when they were caught up in the Warsaw Uprising, and they were then sent to Pruszków transit camp as ordinary Polish citizens, from which they were released in 1945. Tchaikowsky's father, Karl Krauthammer, also survived the war, and remarried, producing a daughter, Katherine, later Krauthammer-Vogt. Tchaikowsky's mother, Felicja Krauthammer (née Rappaport) was confined in the Warsaw Ghetto in 1942, and died in Treblinka.

Andrzej Czajkowski, as he was re-named (he later adopted the spelling André Tchaikowsky), resumed his lessons at age 9 in Łodz State School, under the tuition of Emma Altberg (herself once a student of Wanda Landowska). From there, he went to Paris, where Lazare Lévy took over his musical education, and where he would also break off relations with his father for many years following an argument.

After his return to Poland (1950), he studied at the State Music Academy in Sopot under Prof. Olga Iliwicka-Dąbrowska, and later at the State Music Academy in Warsaw under Prof. Stanisław Szpinalski. He began developing his concert career while still a student, displaying his showmanship through public performances of Bach's Goldberg Variations, Rachmaninoff's Piano Concerto No. 2 and providing listeners with improvisations on various themes. From 1951, he took composition classes with Prof. Kazimierz Sikorski.

After his success at the V International Chopin Piano Competition, where he won the 8th award (1955), Tchaikowsky left to study in Brussels under Polish pianist Stefan Askenase. As a result of his work with Askenase, Tchaikowsky took part in the Queen Elisabeth Music Competition, winning third prize in 1956. That same year, he emigrated to England, where he lived until his death.

In 1957, he gave a series of recitals in Paris, performing all of Ravel's compositions for piano in honour of the twentieth anniversary of the French composer's death. During the same time, he consulted Nadia Boulanger at Fontainbleau on matters of composition, as well as establishing contact with Arthur Rubinstein.

Despite his success as a pianist, André Tchaikowsky’s greatest passion was composition. He wrote two Piano Concertos, a String Quartet, a setting of Shakespeare's Seven Sonnets for voice and piano, a Piano Trio and several compositions for piano solo. These included a Piano Sonata in 1958 and a series of ten Inventions for piano, composed between 1961 and 1962, dedicated to (and portraits of) a series of friends. The final piece is dedicated to his psychiatrist, Michael Riddall. The English pianist Norma Fisher recorded the Inventions for the BBC in 1984.

He also completed an opera, The Merchant of Venice, based on Shakespeare's play. Most of the opera was written by 1978, and following discussions with the music critic Hans Keller, Tchaikowsky decided to submit it for consideration to English National Opera, then under the directorship of Lord Harewood. A playthrough of the first two acts was arranged in December 1981, with Harewood and the ENO artistic director David Pountney and conductor Mark Elder in attendance. But in March 1982 Tchaikowsky received a letter from Harewood turning the opera down. By this time Tchaikowsky was already seriously ill, and he died only three months later. His dying wish was that the opera be performed. The opera was not produced until 2013 at the Bregenz Festival.

For RCA Victor and Columbia EMI, Tchaikowsky recorded works by Bach (Goldberg Variations), Haydn (two Sonatas, Variations in F minor), Mozart (Concerto in C major, two Sonatas and minor works), Schubert (waltzes, ländlers, German dances), Chopin (15 mazurkas) as well as Fauré (Piano Quartet in C minor). He made several recordings of his own works for the EMI label.

== Skull ==
In accordance with Tchaikowsky's wishes, his skull has been used as a theatrical prop by the Royal Shakespeare Company. Here, actor David Tennant uses Tchaikowsky's skull in a 2008 production of Hamlet.

Tchaikowsky died of colon cancer at the age of 46 in Oxford. In his will he left his body to medical research, and donated his skull to the Royal Shakespeare Company, asking that it be used as a prop on stage. Tchaikowsky hoped that his skull would be used for the skull of Yorick in productions of Hamlet. For many years, no actor or director felt comfortable using a real skull in performances, although it was occasionally used in rehearsals. In 2008, the skull was finally held by David Tennant in a series of performances of Hamlet at the Courtyard Theatre in Stratford-upon-Avon.

After the use of Tchaikowsky's skull was revealed in the press, this production of Hamlet moved to the West End and the RSC announced that they would no longer use Tchaikowsky's skull (a spokesman said that it would be "too distracting for the audience"). However, this was a deception; in fact, the skull was used throughout the production's West End run, and in a subsequent television adaptation broadcast on BBC2. Director Gregory Doran said, "André Tchaikowsky's skull was a very important part of our production of Hamlet, and despite all the hype about him, he meant a great deal to the company."

== Selected compositions ==
- Piano Concerto No. 1 (1957)
- Sonata for piano (1958)
- Sonata for clarinet and piano, Op. 1 (1959)
- Inventions for piano, Op. 2 (1961–1962)
- String Quartet No. 1 in A major, Op.3 (1969–1970)
- Piano Concerto No. 2, Op. 4 (1966–1971)
- String Quartet No. 2 in C major, Op. 5 (1973–1975)
- Opera, The Merchant of Venice (1968–1982)

== See also ==
- List of skulls used to depict Yorick

== Bibliography ==
- David A Ferré: "André Tchaikovsky", Music and Musicians (December 1985)
- Belina-Johnson, Anastasia (ed.) (2013). A Musician Divided: André Tchaikowsky in his Own Words. London: Toccata Press. ISBN 9780907689881
- Anita Halina Janowska, My Guardian Demon. Letters of André Tchaikowsky & Halina Janowska 1956-1982. Translated from the Polish by Jacek Laskowski. Smith-Gordon 2014, ISBN 978-1-85463-2494. Polish editions: incomplete first edition ...Mój diabeł stróż. Listy Andrzeja Czajkowskiego i Haliny Sander, selection and edition by Anita Janowska, PIW Warszawa 1988, ISBN 83-06-01362-X. 2nd edition: Wydawnictwo Siedmioróg, Wrocław 1996, ISBN 83-7162-049-7. Extended and illustrated 3rd edition: Anita Halina Janowska, ...Mój diabeł stróż. Listy Andrzeja Czajkowskiego i Haliny Janowskiej, Wydawnictwo W.A.B., Warszawa, 2011, ISBN 978-8-37747-536-2.
