= Hervé Billaut =

French pianist

Hervé Billaut (born 5 August 1964) is a French classical pianist.

== Biography ==
Born in Villefranche-sur-Saône, Billaud joined the Conservatoire de Lyon at the age of ten. He continued his studies at the Conservatoire de Paris, where he entered the classes of Germaine Mounier (piano), Jean Hubeau (chamber music), Jeanine Rueff and Bernard de Crépy (writing).

Billaut won a Grand Prize at the "Marguerite Long Competition" (1983), and distinguished himself in numerous international competitions (Viotti, 1981; Vercelli, 1982; Épinal International Piano Competition, 1983; Pretoria, 1990; Tokyo, 1995). He performed in France at the Salle Pleyel, the Théâtre des Champs-Elysées, in Spain, at the Teatro Real in Madrid, and on all continents, notably in South America, China, Japan and Korea. He collaborated with the choreographers Jean-Christophe Maillot, John Neumeier and Roland Petit as soloist of Les Ballets de Monte Carlo and performs regularly at the festivals of Festival de La Roque-d'Anthéron, in Granada, Paris, Toulouse and La Folle Journée of Nantes. He is artistic director of the Rendez-vous de Rochebonne.

== Notable recordings ==
- Maurice Ravel:
  - Gaspard de la Nuit, Le Tombeau de Couperin (éd. REM, 1985);
  - Piano Concerto, Piano Concerto for the Left Hand, with the Monte-Carlo Philharmonic Orchestra, dir. Claude Bardon (1987)
- Jacques Castérède: Works for 1 and 2 pianos, H. Billaut, G. Ibanez, J. Castérède (éd. REM)
- Isaac Albéniz: Iberia, Navarra, Suite Española No. 1, Op. 47
- Gabriel Fauré: Works for piano (éd. Lyrinx, 2004)
- Paul Dukas: Works for piano (éd. Mirare, 2015)

== Sources ==
Biographical information from record booklets
