= Germaine Mounier =

20th-century French classical pianist

Germaine Mounier (7 February 1920 – 27 June 2006) was a 20th-century French classical pianist and music educator.

== Biography ==
Born in Neuilly-sur-Seine, Mounier won First prize at the Conservatoire de Paris. She worked the piano with Yves Nat and Magda Tagliaferro. She entered the École Normale de Musique de Paris, taught in Salzbourg as well as in Bulgaria where she created a Concours Albert Roussel. With pianist Hélène Boschi she formed a duet with a very vast repertoire, recording works by Mozart, Clementi, Debussy and Busoni (disque REM). A great admirer and interpreter of Chopin, Mounier created the Festival Chopin at the Orangerie of the Parc de Bagatelle in Paris, of which she was Vice-présidente. Among her many students were talents as diverse as Catherine Collard, Françoise Thinat, Véronique Bonnecaze, Erik Berchot, Pavlos Yallourakis, Alexandre Tharaud, Aglika Genova, Liuben Dimitrov, Jeffrey Grice, Mathilde Carré, Roumen Kroumov, François Chouchan, Iliana Todorova, François Daudet, Jean-Louis Haguenauer, Andrea Tusacciu, Walid Akl, Hélène and Marie Desmoulin, Patrick Fayad, Hervé Billaut, André Isoir, Caroline Sageman, Michel Laurent, Claude Bolling, Albert Kuznetsov, Mari Kodama and Momo Kodama.

Mounier died in Paris in 2006.

== Recordings ==
- Debussy, Busoni : Musique pour 2 pianos / vol.2 : En blanc et noir - Sonate / op. 12 n° 5 - Sonate / K. 448 - Fantasia contrappuntistica de Busoni (Duo Boschi-Mounier)
