= Mayumi Kameda =

Japanese pianist

Mayumi Kameda (亀田真弓, Kameda Mayumi) is a Japanese pianist.

Trained at the Tōhō Gakuen Daigaku, she completed her studies at the Conservatoire de Paris, with teacher Gabriel Tacchino. Kameda won the 1981 Épinal International Piano Competition and placed second in the 1983 Cleveland International Piano Competition.

She remains internationally active as a concert pianist in a duo with Jean-Jacques Balet.
