= Claude Kahn =

French pianist (1935–2023)

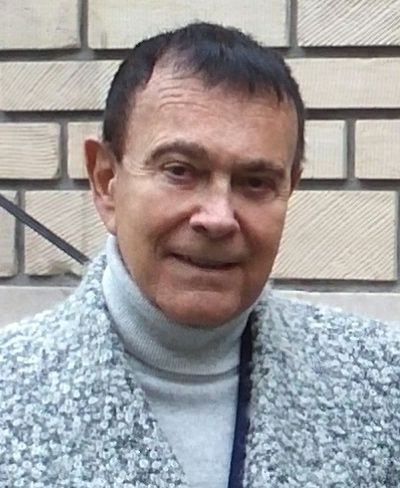
- Kahn in 2015
- Born: 9 November 1935; Marseille, France
- Died: 17 November 2023 (aged 88); Golfe-Juan, France
- Occupations: Pianist; Conservatoire director

Claude Kahn (9 November 1935 – 17 November 2023) was a French classical pianist, internationally known for his interpretations of especially the music of Chopin, but also of French music (Debussy, Fauré, Ravel) as soloist or accompanied by great orchestras in the world. He founded and directed a piano competition in 1970, to become international as the Concours International de Piano Claude Kahn. He founded the conservatoire of Antibes in 1971 and directed it until 1991.

== Biography ==
Born in Marseille, Kahn started playing the piano at the age of four, then for over 10 years was a student of Marguerite Long. His other teachers were Yves Nat and Nadia Boulanger. He received a prize for best interpretation at the Franz Liszt Competition in Budapest at age 15, as well as the Medal of the Competition in Geneva.

He played more than 2000 concerts worldwide, as a soloist and with orchestras including the Orchestre National de France, the Orchestre de la garde républicaine, the London Symphony Orchestra, the Israel Symphony Orchestra and the Philadelphia Orchestra.

In 1970, he created the "Claude Kahn International Piano Competition" which became "International" in 1980 and European in 1990. The finals and the concert of the winners traditionally take place at the Salle Gaveau in Paris. Among the winners are Bernard d'Ascoli, Delphine Bardin, Giovanni Bellucci, François Daudet, Kazuoki Fujii and Alexandre Tharaud.

Kahn founded the Conservatoire de Musique et d'Art Dramatique d'Antibes-Juan les Pins in Antibes in 1971 and directed it until 1991. He also directed the Cagnes-sur-Mer conservatoire.

He was awarded the Palmier d'Or "for his promotion of classical music throughout the world", was made Chevalier des Arts et des Lettres, and received the Palmes Académiques and the Mérite National.

Kahn died on 17 November 2023, at age 88.

== Recordings ==
Kahn recorded more than 25 albums, especially of works by Chopin, his favourite composer, but also Mozart, Beethoven, Schubert, Liszt, Schumann, Brahms, Tchaikovsky, Rachmaninoff, Debussy, Fauré, Ravel, and others.

They include:

- Liszt: Hungarian Fantasy, Piano Sonata in B minor (1960).
- Tchaikovsky: Piano Concerto No. 1 / Liszt: Hungarian Fantasy, with the Cologne Philharmonic Orchestra conducted by Wolfgang Rößler (1963)
- Ravel: Piano Concerto and Piano Concerto for the Left Hand, with the London Symphony Orchestra conducted by Georges Tzipine (1978)
- Chopin: Piano Concerto No. 2 and Preludes, with the NDR Symphony Orchestra conducted by Wolfgang Rößler (1978)
- Rachmaninoff: Piano Concerto No. 2 / Mozart: Piano Concerto No. 9, with the Orchestre Symphonique Français conducted by Sabine Diaz (2005)
- Debussy: 24 Préludes (1979)
- Liszt: Hungarian Fantasy, NDR Symphony Orchestra conducted by Wolfgang Rößler, Grand galop chromatique, Piano Sonata in B minor (1979).
- Ravel: Gaspard de la nuit, Fauré: Thème et variations (1980)
- Les Bis, works by composers from Bach to Scriabin (1984)
- Debussy: 24 Préludes (1998)
