= Dan Zhaoyi =

Chinese pianist (born 1940)

- 但昭义
- Born: 1940 (age 85–86); Chongqing, Sichuan, China
- Education: Sichuan Conservatory of Music
- Occupations: Pianist, Piano Pedagogue
- Musical career
- Genres: Classical
- Instrument: Piano

Dan Zhaoyi (simplified Chinese: 但昭义; traditional Chinese: 但昭義; born 1940), is a Chinese classical pianist and piano pedagogue. He is regarded as the "Godfather" of piano education in China.

== Early life and education ==
Zhaoyi was born in Chongqing, Sichuan, China in 1940, and was from a family of doctors. Since his father was interested in music, both Zhaoyi and his brother received music education. Later, Zhaoyi studied under Zhou Guangren at Sichuan Conservatory of Music.

== Career ==
Zhaoyi serves as a tenured professor of Shenzhen Arts School. He is also the dean of Piano Art Institute, Sichuan Conservatory of Music. Additionally, he serves as counselor of Piano Society of Chinese Musicians' Association and Honorary Chairman of Shenzhen Musicians Association.

== Students ==
Zhaoyi's students includes Yundi, Zee Zee, Sa Chen and Haochen Zhang.

== Bibliography ==
=== Biography ===
- 但昭义钢琴艺术人生 [Dan Zhaoyi's Life for the Art of Piano] (in Chinese). 上海音乐出版社. 1 November 2011. ISBN 9787807518730.
