= Mari Kodama =

Japanese pianist (born 1967)

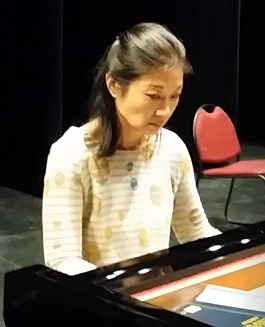
- Mari Kodama in L'Assomption, Québec, Canada at the Hector-Charland Theatre

Background information
- Born: Osaka, Japan
- Genre: Classical
- Occupation: Pianist
- Instrument: Piano
- Years active: 1987–present
- Website: marikodama.com

Mari Kodama (児玉 麻里, Kodama Mari) (born 1967) is a classical pianist who has performed in Europe, North America and Japan.

== Background ==
Kodama was born in Osaka, Japan in 1967 and raised in Germany and Paris, France due to her father's postings in these countries as well as in Switzerland and England. She and her sister Momo are the daughters of a pianist mother and banker father. Their mother gave up performances for teaching and Mari assuming everyone played piano. She wanted to begin playing at age 2, but her parents thought she was too young. She was able to read notes by age three. By the age of 10, she decided to be a concert pianist by not returning to Japan to prepare for university. She studied piano at the Conservatoire de Paris starting at age 14 under Germaine Mounier, and chamber music under Geneviève Joy-Dutilleux. She performed in various European competitions while still a teenager. She made her Japanese debut in 1984 at age 17 and was immediately a success.

== Performances ==
Her first major debut was in 1987 playing Prokofiev's Piano Concerto No. 3 with the London Philharmonic. Kodama made her debut at Carnegie's Weill Recital Hall in 1995.

She has collaborated with Tatiana Nikolaeva and Alfred Brendel, as well as her sister Momo Kodama at various venues including the 2014 Festival Internacional Cervantino.

Kodama has performed throughout Europe, the United States, and Japan, and has appeared at venues such as Mostly Mozart, Bard Music Festival, the Hollywood Bowl, California's Midsummer Mozart Festival, and European festivals such as those in Lockenhaus, Lyon, Montpelier, Salzburg, Aix-en-Provence, Aldeburgh, Verbier, La Roque-d’Anthéron and Évian.

In 2002, she gave her final performance of the complete Beethoven piano sonata cycle, which she presented over three consecutive seasons in Los Angeles and Pasadena, California.

Kodama is a founding member of chamber music festivals in San Francisco/USA and Postignano/Italy. She and her husband, conductor Kent Nagano, present Musical Days at Forest Hill.

== Personal life ==
Kodama is married to conductor Kent Nagano. They have one daughter, Karin Kei Nagano.

== Discography ==
- Bruckner: Piano Works - PENTATONE PTC5187224 (2024)
- Mozart & Poulenc Double & Triple Piano Concertos - Mari Kodama, Momo Kodama, Karin Kei Nagano, Orchestre de la Suisse Romande, Kent Nagano. PENTATONE PTC5187202 (2024)
- New Paths - Johannes Brahms, Clara and Robert Schumann. Mari Kodama. PENTATONE PTC 5186976 (2022)
- MON AMI, Mon amour - French Repertoire for Cello and Piano. Matt Haimovitz, Mari Kodama. PENTATONE Oxingale Series PTC 5186816 (2020)
- Beethoven - Kaleidoscope: Beethoven Transcriptions. PENTATONE PTC 5186841 (2020)
- Martinu - Double Concertos. Lawrence Foster, Momo Kodama, Sarah Nemtanu, Deborah Nemtanu, Magali Demesse, Orchestre Philharmonique de Marseille. PENTATONE PTC 5186658 (2018)
- Manuel de Falla - Noches en los jardines de España / El sombrero de tres picos. Kazuki Yamada, Mari Kodama, Sophie Harmsen, Orchestre de la Suisse Romande. PENTATONE PTC 5186598 (2017).
- Tchaikovsky - Ballet Suites for Piano Duo. Mari Kodama, Momo Kodama. PENTATONE PTC 5186579 (2016).
- Beethoven - The Piano Concertos and. Triple Concerto. Mari Kodama (piano), Kolja Blacher (violin), Johannes Moser (cello). Deutsches Symphonie-Orchester Berlin. Kent Nagano, conductor. Berlin Classics (2015).
- Beethoven - The Complete Piano Sonatas Mari Kodama. PENTATONE PTC 5186490 (2014).
- Creating Timeless Classics. Works by Robert Schumann, Peter Ilyich Tchaikovsky, Johann Sebastian Bach, Ludwig van Beethoven, Howard Blake. Martin Helmchen, Arabella Steinbacher, Nareh Arghamanyan, Mari Kodama, Julia Fischer, Russian National Orchestra, Concertgebouw Chamber Orchestra, Academy of St Martin in the Fields, Orchestre de la Suisse Romande. PENTATONE PTC 5186531 (2014).
- Beethoven Piano Sonatas Op. 101 & Op. 106 “Hammerklavier”. Mari Kodama. PENTATONE PTC 5186391 (2013).
- Beethoven - Triple Concerto; Piano Concerto No. 3. Mari Kodama (piano), Kolja Blacher (violin), Johannes Moser (cello). Deutsches Symphonie-Orchester Berlin Kent Nagano, conductor Berlin Classics 300331 (2012)
- Beethoven - Piano Sonatas Nos. 9, 10, 19, 20, 24, 25. Mari Kodama. PENTATONE PTC 5186304 (2010).
- Beethoven - Piano Sonatas Op. 2 Nos. 1, 2 & 3. Mari Kodama. PENTATONE PTC 5186067 (2008).
- Beethoven Piano Sonatas op 10 Nos. 1, 2, & 3. Mari Kodama. PENTATONE PTC 5186377 (2011).
- Beethoven - Piano Sonatas Nos. 16, 17 "Tempest" and 18 "The Hunt". PENTATONE PTC 5186063(2006).
- Beethoven Piano Sonatas Op.109, Op.110, Op.111. Mari Kodama. PENTATONE PTC 5186389 (2012).
- Beethoven Piano Sonatas Op.22, Op.26, Op.27, Op.54. Mari Kodama. PENTATONE PTC 5186390 (2012).
- Beethoven - Piano Sonatas "Moonlight" & "Pathétique" & No.4 Op.7. Mari Kodama. PENTATONE PTC 5186023 (2004).
- Super Audio CD Sampler. Works by Wolfgang Amadeus Mozart, Ludwig van Beethoven, Felix Mendelssohn-Bartholdy, Franz Schmidt, Gustav Mahler. Marco Boni, Hartmut Haenchen, Nikolai Korniev, Yakov Kreizberg, Simon Murphy, Kent Nagano, Bram Beekman, Vesko Eschkenazy, Mari Kodama, Miranda van Kralingen, Nikolai Lugansky, Keisuke Wakao, Concertgebouw Chamber Orchestra PENTATONE PTC 5186043 (2003).
- Frédéric Chopin & Carl Loewe - Piano Concertos Mari Kodama, Kent Nagano, Russian National Orchestra. PENTATONE PTC 5186026 (2003).
- Beethoven - Piano Sonatas "Waldstein", "Appassionata" and "Les adieux". Mari Kodama. PENTATONE PTC 5186024 (2003).
