= François Daudet =

French pianist

François Daudet (French: [fʁɑ̃swa dodɛ]; born 20 January 1965) is a French classical pianist.

Born in Lyon, Daudet won first prize for piano at the Conservatoire de Paris, and first grand prize at the international Claude Kahn competition in 1983. He benefited from Germaine Mounier's and Menahem Pressler's teaching. He won international competitions in Colmar, Graz, Trapani, Florence, and won a first international prize in The Glory of Mozart competition.

He has performed in many countries in Europe, America and Asia. His partners are Marie-Annick Nicolas, Natalie Chee, Virginie Robilliard, David Louwerse and Dorothée Bocquet. His recordings have received several awards in the specialized press.
