= Radom Chamber Orchestra =

Municipal cultural organisation

Radom Chamber Orchestra, known in Polish as Radomska Orkiestra Kameralna was established as a municipal cultural organisation on 1 January 2007 by the Radom, Poland city authorities. It is made up of sixteen musicians under the direction of Maciej Żółtowski, the ensemble's managing and artistic director in the years 2007–2017.

In addition to regular concerts, the orchestra organised special events like the Krzysztof Penderecki International Composers' Competition ARBORETUM, International Conductors' Competition AUDITE, International Festival of String Quartets and Conductors’ Academy. The orchestra has performed with such prominent soloists and conductors as Lidia Grychtołówna, Adam Wodnicki, Piotr Pławner, Tytus Wojnowicz, Jacek Mirucki, Patrick Gallois, Avri Levitan, Marko Ylönen, Jonathan Brett Łukasz Borowicz and Krzysztof Penderecki. Its diverse repertoire included works from the staple string orchestra repertoire as well as the less known, recently discovered or commissioned pieces. In 2009 the orchestra released its first CD with music by the famous Polish woman composer, Grażyna Bacewicz (DUX 0691). This CD has been nominated for an International Classical Music Award (ICMA) and received enthusiastic reviews in the international press (Diapason, Scherzo). In 2011 and 2013 further recordings have been released, including a CD in the special series with works by Krzysztof Penderecki. After Maciej Zoltowski's departure the orchestra's profile changed towards pop, folk and jazz music under new directorship of Natalia Rogińska.

== Discography ==
- Grażyna Bacewicz (Dux Records 0691).
- Krzysztof Penderecki Lukasz Dlugosz, Rafal Kwiatkowski. (Dux)
