= Joseph Young (conductor) =

American orchestra conductor (born 1982)

Joseph Young (born 9 April 1982 in Goose Creek, South Carolina, USA) is an American orchestra conductor.

== Biography ==
From a family of 3 children, with a military father, Young played trumpet as a youth in South Carolina. His interest in conducting began at age 16. In 2004, Young received a bachelor's degree in Music Education from the University of South Carolina. After graduation, he taught band at D. W. Daniel High School in Central, South Carolina. In 2007, Young became the first recipient of the Baltimore Symphony Orchestra-Peabody Conducting Fellowship. At Peabody, he studied conducting under Gustav Meier and Markand Thakar, graduating in 2009. He participated in a conducting workshop at the Cabrillo Festival of Contemporary Music, and subsequently became a conducting student of Marin Alsop.

Young was resident conductor of the Phoenix Symphony for 2 seasons. He was also a conducting fellow with the Buffalo Philharmonic Orchestra for one year. In 2013, he was a Semi-finalist in the Gustav Mahler Conducting Competition in Bamberg, Germany. In 2014, Young became assistant conductor of the Atlanta Symphony and music director of the Atlanta Symphony Youth Orchestra. He served in these Atlanta posts until 2018. He is also the resident conductor of the National Youth Orchestra (USA) at Carnegie Hall, and director of ensembles at the Peabody Conservatory.

In January 2019, Young first guest-conducted the Berkeley Symphony, as an emergency substitute conductor. Based on this concert, in April 2019, the Berkeley Symphony announced the appointment of Young as its next music director, effective with the 2019-2020 season, with an initial contract of 3 years. This appointment marks Young's first music directorship. In July 2022, the Berkeley Symphony announced the extension of Young's contract as music director through the 2024-2025 season. In November 2024, the Berkeley Symphony announced that Young is to conclude his tenure as its music director at the close of the 2024–2025 season.

In 2022, Young conducted the then-newly-formed Mzansi National Philharmonic Orchestra in South Africa. His work in contemporary music has included conducting the premiere of William Menefield and Sheila Williams' Fierce with Cincinnati Opera. In July 2024, Young conducted the stage premiere of Sir Paul McCartney's and Carl Davis' Liverpool Oratorio for Cincinnati Opera.

Cultural offices
Preceded by Joana Carneiro	Music Director, Berkeley Symphony; 2019–2025	Succeeded by (post vacant)
