= Lester Lynch =

American operatic baritone

Lester Lynch is an American operatic baritone.

== Early life and career ==
Lynch learned to sing in a church choir, and attended Baldwin-Wallace College, the New England Conservatory of Music, and Juilliard.

== Notable performances ==
Lynch has performed as a baritone, Crown, in The Gershwins' Porgy and Bess as well as a bass, Garage mechanic, in The Great Gatsby's first European performance on December 6, 2015. He reprised the role in 2020.

Lynch participated in the 1996 Metropolitan Opera National Council Auditions. He has performed with Luna Pearl Woolf. He has sung at the Festival Napa Valley, and in Bergen, Norway.

The Welsh National Opera gave The Merchant of Venice its British premiere in Cardiff on 16 September 2016, using the Bregenz production. The conductor was Lionel Friend, and the role of Shylock was sung by Lynch. Lynch is an African American and this in the opinion of the critic of The Guardian gave the opera "a further racist edge... [and] a deliberately shocking contemporary resonance."

== Recordings ==
- Gulbenkian Orchestra – Giuseppe Verdi – Otello. Pentatone PTC 5186562 (2017)
- Asher Fisch – Gordon Getty – The Little Match Girl. Nikolai Schukoff, Lester Lynch, Melody Moore, Asher Fisch, Ulf Schirmer, Münchner Rundfunkorchester, Chor des Bayerischen Rundfunks. Pentatone PTC 5186480 (2015)
- David Garner (composer) – 2015 – December Celebration: New Carols by Seven American Composers. Includes Three Carols. Works by Mark Adamo, William Bolcom, John Corigliano, David Garner, Gordon Getty, Jake Heggie, Luna Pearl Woolf. Performed by Lisa Delan, Lester Lynch, Steven Bailey, Dawn Harms, Musicians of the New Century Chamber Orchestra, Volti Chorus. Pentatone PTC 5186537.
- John Harbison, The Great Gatsby (Publisher: AMP1999), Opera publisher G. Schirmer, Inc.
- Goodbye, Mr. Chips
