= Joana Carneiro =

Portuguese conductor

Joana Carneiro (born Joana Maria Amaro da Costa da Luz Carneiro; 30 September 1976 in Lisbon), is a Portuguese conductor.

== Family ==
Joana Carneiro is the third of the nine children of the former Portuguese Minister of Education Roberto Carneiro. She is a niece of the Portuguese politician Adelino Amaro da Costa.

As a youth, Carneiro played the viola. In Portugal, Carneiro studied music at the Academia Nacional Superior de Orquestra in Lisbon, where she attended the class of Jean-Marc Burfin. She earned a master's degree in music from Northwestern University, studying under Victor Yampolsky and Mallory Thompson. She continued graduate studies in music for a doctorate at the University of Michigan, where her teachers included Kenneth Kieser. At the University of Michigan, she also served as the conductor of the University Symphony Orchestra and University Philharmonia Orchestra.

Carneiro first gained attention as a finalist in the 2002 Maazel-Vilar Conductor's Competition at Carnegie Hall. She then served as music director of the Los Angeles Debut Orchestra from 2002 to 2005. She has worked as an assistant conductor with the Los Angeles Chamber Orchestra. She was an American Symphony Orchestra League Conducting Fellow with the Los Angeles Philharmonic from 2005 to 2008. In Portugal, Carneiro became principal guest conductor of the Metropolitan Orchestra of Lisbon as of the 2005–2006 season. In the 2006–2007 season, she became principal guest conductor of the Gulbenkian Orchestra, and held the post through the 2012–2013 season.

In the US, in January 2009, Carneiro was named the third music director of the Berkeley Symphony, effective with the 2009–2010 season, with an initial contract of 3 years. The first woman to hold this post, the position marks Carneiro's first music directorship, and her first concert in that capacity took place in October 2009. In May 2018, the Berkeley Symphony announced the conclusion of Carneiro's music directorship of the orchestra at the end of the 2017–2018 season, at which time she is to take the title of music director emerita.

In September 2013, Carneiro was announced as the next principal conductor of the Orquestra Sinfónica Portuguesa at the Teatro Nacional de São Carlos, effective 1 January 2014.

Carneiro will make her Edinburgh International Festival debut in August 2019, leading the BBC Scottish Symphony Orchestra and organist Stephen Farr in a performance of Sir James MacMillan's pieces A Scotch Bestiary and Woman of the Apocalypse.

== Personal life ==
Carneiro has been married twice. Her first husband was Simão Vital, an investment banker. Her second marriage, in September 2011, was to José de Assunção Gonçalves, a physician. The couple are the parents of triplets, born in February 2017.

== Awards ==
- 2002: National Conductor Search of the Young Musician's Foundation
- 2010: Helen M. Thompson award from the League of American Orchestras

Cultural offices
Preceded by Kent Nagano	Music Director, Berkeley Symphony; 2009–2018	Succeeded by Joseph Young
Preceded by Julia Jones	Principal Conductor, Orquestra Sinfónica Portuguesa; 2014–present	Succeeded by incumbent
