= Sylviane Deferne =

Swiss pianist and musician

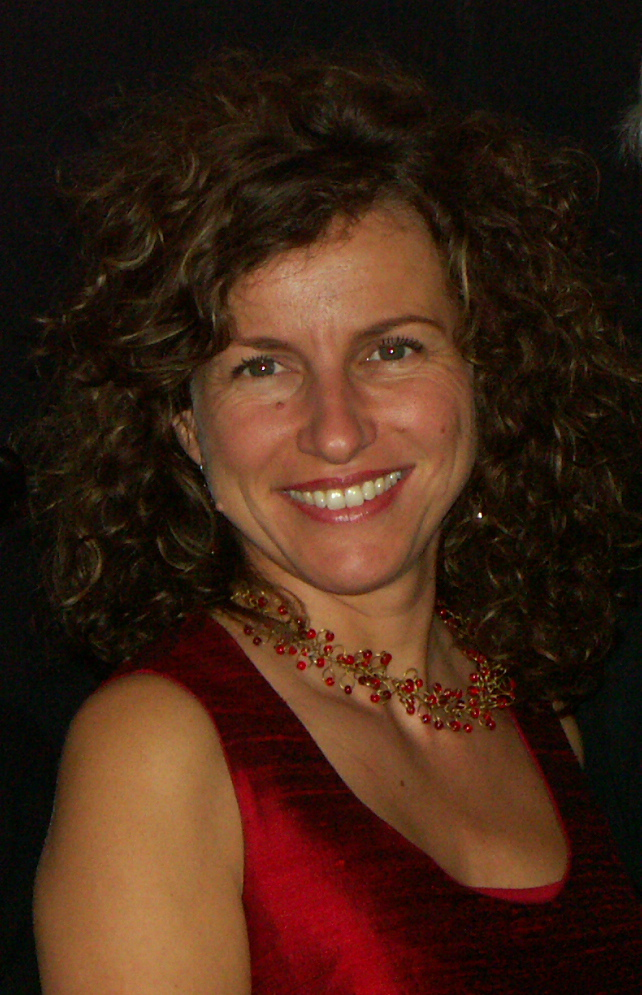

Background information
- Born: Sylviane Deferne; 1965 (age 60–61); Geneva, Switzerland
- Genres: Classical music
- Occupation: Concert pianist
- Instrument: Piano
- Website: Official website

Sylviane Deferne (born 1965 in Geneva, Switzerland) is a Swiss pianist and musician.

== Early musical education ==
Deferne started studying the piano in the Geneva Conservatory of Music of her hometown of Geneva, and she soon won first prize of virtuosity with distinction. She won several international competitions, including first prize unanimously at the Frank Martin Competition in the Netherlands, and second prizes in the international competitions at William Kapell in the United States and in Cologne, Germany.

== Career ==
Deferne has had engagements as a soloist in Europe and the US. She has partnered in ensembles including Orchestre de la Suisse Romande, the Orchestre de Chambre de Lausanne, National Symphony Orchestra in Washington, D.C., and the Montreal Symphony Orchestra.

== Recordings ==
Recordings have been made under the labels of Cascavelle and R.E.M. Under the Decca label, the Concerto for Two Pianos by Poulenc was recorded in collaboration with Pascal Rogé and the New Philharmonia of London, conducted by Charles Dutoit. She had three discs produced by Radio-Canada.

== Performances ==
Reviews on her interpretation of music by Bach, Schubert, Brahms, Karol Szymanowski, Chopin, Grieg and Rachmaninoff have been published.

Deferne has toured in Germany, France, Romania, Korea, Canada and various cities in Switzerland. She also plays chamber music; with the Trio Ceresio, which she joined in 2007, she regularly performs in Switzerland, and toured in Japan.

In May 2008, Deferne was invited to perform as a soloist with the Orchestra della Svizzera Italiana in Switzerland, with the Concerto No.1 by Frank Martin. She teaches classes of professional piano at the Haute Ecole de Musique in Geneva in the Conservatories at Neuchâtel and Geneva.
