= Tamayo Ikeda =

Japanese pianist

- Tamayo Ikeda in 2021
- Born: 1971 (age 54–55); Yokohama, Japan
- Occupation: Pianist

Tamayo Ikeda, born in 1971 in Yokohama (Japan), is a classical pianist.

== Biography ==
Tamayo Ikeda was born in 1971 in Yokohama, Japan.

After studying at Yokohama Futaba School, she enrolled at Toho Gakuen in Tokyo and was then admitted to the Conservatoire National Supérieur de Musique in Paris in 1989.

She won two first prizes in piano and chamber music before entering the advanced training program.

She was awarded the second prize and the Special Claude Debussy Prize at the Yvonne Lefébure International Competition, a Special Prize (Claude Debussy) at the Porto International Competition, and the first prize at the Francis Poulenc International Competition in 1999 (along with the Special Casadesus Prize).

Tamayo Ikeda has performed in Europe, the United Kingdom, Norway, Finland, Japan, Russia, Indonesia, South Africa, Thailand and the United States, notably in venues such as Hamarikyu Hall (Tokyo) and Carnegie Hall (New York). She has appeared on France Musique and performed with Gérard Poulet, Régis Pasquier, Roland Daugareil, Jean Ferrandis, Naoto Otomo, and Patrick Zygmanowski.

She has served as a jury member for several international competitions.

She teaches at the Francis Poulenc and Erik Satie Conservatories of the City of Paris.

She was selected as one of the "30 personalities shaping Japan in France" by the France-Japan Press Association which brings together French and Japanese journalists

Ulysses Arts is distributing her two most recent recordings. She has been reviewed by Textura, Interlude, Classica, Diapason magazine, Yomiuri, Ongaku Gendai, and others. She appeared on the front page of Chopin Magazine, June 2026.

== Discography and artistic direction ==
- Solo piano works by Gabriel Fauré and Francis Poulenc. Arcobaleno, 1999.
- Piano four hands, Le Piano Danse (DVD). Creativ'Art Japan, 2006.
- Four-hand piano music by Maurice Ravel and Igor Stravinsky. With Patrick Zygmanowski. Harmonia Mundi, 2005.
- Four-hand piano works by Franz Schubert. With Patrick Zygmanowski. Warner, 2009.
- L'Imparfait by Charles Perrault, narrated by Coline Serreau. Arrangements by Patrick Zygmanowski. Corélia, 2010.
- Le Piano Danse. With Patrick Zygmanowski. Harmonia Mundi, 2015.
- Russian Sonatas for Violin and Piano by Igor Stravinsky and Sergei Prokofiev (with Gérard Poulet). Continuo Musique, 2020.
- Impromptus D.899 by Franz Schubert and lieder transcriptions by Franz Liszt. Ulysses Arts and King Records 2022.
- The Nocturne – Gabriel Fauré and Frédéric Chopin.Ulysses Arts, 2024 and King Records, 2024.

She founded the Festiv' Music Festival of Yokohama in 2006 in Japan and serves as artistic director for the Honganji Foundation "Cercle Âme du Japon" (Kyoto)
