= Calm Sea and Prosperous Voyage (Mendelssohn) =

Song composed by Felix Mendelssohn

Meeresstille und glückliche Fahrt Calm Sea and Prosperous Voyage
- Concert overture by Felix Mendelssohn
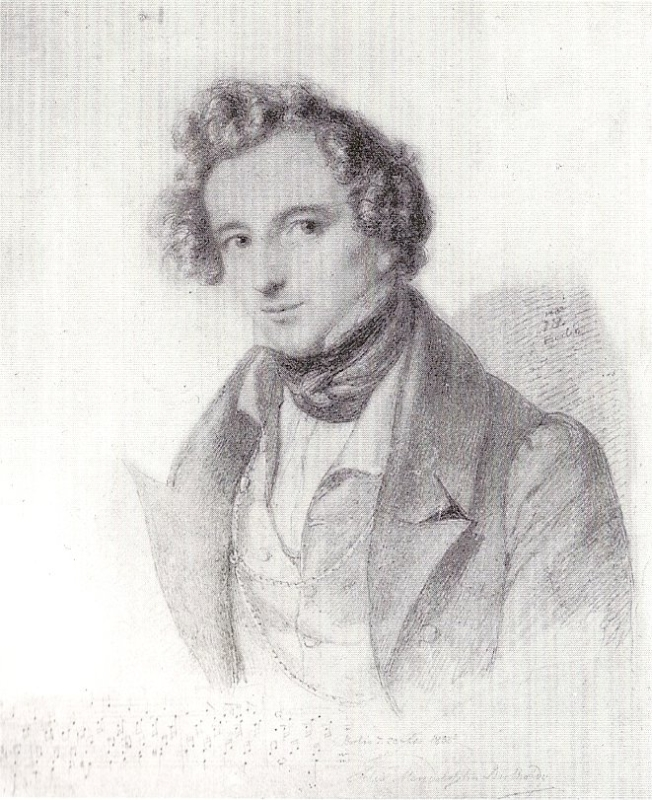
- The composer in 1833, drawing by Eduard Bendemann
- Key: D major
- Opus: 27
- Based on: two poems by Goethe
- Performed: 7 September 1828: Berlin
- Published: 1835

Calm Sea and Prosperous Voyage (Meeresstille und glückliche Fahrt), Op. 27, is an orchestral concert overture by Felix Mendelssohn inspired by the same pair of poems by Johann Wolfgang von Goethe that inspired Beethoven's 1815 cantata of the same title (and in the same key, D major). Mendelssohn's work was first performed on 7 September 1828 in Berlin.

The titles of Goethe's two poems are not synonymous: in the days before steam, a totally calm sea was cause for alarm; it is only when the wind at last rises that the ship can continue on its journey.

Mendelssohn described his interpretation of Goethe’s calm sea as: “a pitch gently sustained by the strings for a long while hovers here and there and trembles, barely audible... The whole stirs sluggishly from the passage with heavy tedium. Finally, it comes to a halt with thick chords and the Prosperous Voyage sets out.” Goethe’s lively winds that then hasten the ship into view of land are depicted with “all the wind instruments, the timpani, oboes and flutes.. playing merrily to the end.”

The overture concludes with a fanfare of trumpets suggesting the ship's final arrival at its port of destination.

Scored for piccolo, 2 flutes, 2 oboes, 2 clarinets, 2 bassoons, double bassoon, serpent, 2 horns, 3 trumpets, timpani and strings, the piece is programmatic for its reference of the two poems by Goethe. These two poems were extremely popular, and at the time of the premiere, Mendelssohn could have assumed that the audience would have been familiar with both poems and able to follow the programme of the music with minimal aid. The work is a concert overture - meaning that it is not intended as a prelude to a larger work such as an opera (as 'overture', deriving from the French for 'opening', more often implies). Instead, the piece is performed as an independent piece in a symphonic concert. The term overture here refers to the use of melody and form. However, it could also be considered as an early form of tone poem.

Edward Elgar quotes a theme from the overture in the 13th variation of his Enigma Variations to represent one of his "friends pictured within" on a ship bound for New Zealand.
