= Momo Kodama =

Japanese pianist (born 1972)

- Born: Momo Kodama; 1972 (age 53–54); Osaka, Japan
- Genre: Classical
- Occupation: Pianist
- Years active: 1991–present
- Website: momokodama.com

Momo Kodama (児玉 桃, Kodama Momo; born 1972) is a Japanese classical pianist. She was born in Osaka but grew up in Europe, attending the Conservatoire de Paris with older sister Mari. She made her debut in 1991 with the Berkeley Symphony Orchestra and was the youngest winner of the International Piano Competition in Munich at age 19. Since then she has performed with various symphonic orchestras and at cultural festivals in Europe and Latin America and has released a number of recordings.

== Background and education ==
Kodama was born in Osaka, Japan, but spent her early years in Europe, with her family moving there in 1973 and attending school in Germany. She began playing piano at age three and like older sister Mari, did her professional studies at the National Conservatory of Music in Paris with Momo entering at age 13. Kodama studied with Murray Perahia, András Schiff, Vera Gornostayeva and Tatiana Nikolayeva.

== Career ==
Kodama made her debut in 1991 at the Berkeley Symphony Orchestra, and since then has performed with the Berlin Philharmonic, Boston Symphony Orchestra, Bayerisches Staatsorchester, NHK Symphony Orchestra, NDR Hamburg, Orchestre de chambre de Paris, Orchestra Philharmonique de Monte-Carlo and the Royal Liverpool Philharmonic Orchestra.

She has collaborated with violinists Christian Tetzlaff, Renaud Capuçon, Augustin Dumay; cellists Mario Brunello, Steven Isserlis and Christian-Pierre La Marca, her sister, pianist Mari Kodama; and the clarinettist Jörg Widmann.

Kodama has also appeared in various cultural festivals such as the Marlboro in the United States, Verbier in Switzerland; Festival de La Roque-d'Anthéron and Festival d'Automne in France, Festival Enesco in Romania, Festival Tivoli in Denmark, Settembre Music in Italy, and Schleswig-Holstein in Germany. She performed at the Festival Beethoven in Colombia in 2013, and with sister Mari at the Festival Internacional Cervantino in Mexico in 2014.

Her first major award was first place at the 1987 Concours International d'Epinal. Kodomo was the youngest winner at the International Piano Competition in Munich at age 19. She later won the 1999 International Terence Judd Award in England, and the 2011 Saji Keizo Prize from the Suntory Foundation.

== Artistry ==
Her repertoire is mostly French and Japanese, specializing in more modern compositions (20th century and contemporary) . Composers include Toru Takemitsu, Ichiro Nodaïra, Toshio Hosokawa, Olivier Messiaen and Jörg Widmann.

Her playing has been described as "crystalline" with Philip Kennicott stating: "She's a natty player fastidious when it comes to textures and transparency. Her occasional re-discovery of quietness was refreshing, and she bought out those rare moments when Tchaikovsky says two things at once rather than one thing very insistently. There seems to be intelligence at work."

== Recordings ==
- Martinu - Double Concertos. Lawrence Foster, Mari Kodama, Sarah Nemtanu, Deborah Nemtanu, Magali Demesse, Orchestre Philharmonique de Marseille. PENTATONE PTC 5186658 (2018)
- Tchaikovsky - Ballet Suites for Piano Duo. Mari Kodama, Momo Kodama. PENTATONE PTC 5186579 (2016).
- La Vallée des Cloches (2012)
- Catalogue d'oiseaux (2009)
- A Night of Rhythm and Dance: Live from the Waldbühne, Berlin (2006) with Susan Graham, Mari Kodama, Eitetsu Hayashi, Kent Nagano (conducting Berlin Philharmonic)
- Vingt Regards Sur L’enfant-Jesus (2005)
- Chopin Piano Works (2003)
- Debussy Impressions (2002)
