= Maciej Żółtowski =

Polish conductor and composer

Maciej Żółtowski - alternative spelling: Zoltowski (born 1971, Warsaw, Poland) is a Polish conductor and composer. Maciej Żółtowski studied violin at the F. Chopin and J. Elsner Music Schools in Warsaw. Having earned his diploma in violin performance with distinction, he continued his studies at the F. Chopin Academy of Music in Warsaw, where he graduated in 1996 in composition and in 1997 in conducting faculty, obtaining both M.A. diplomas with awards. His teachers at the academy included Prof. Marian Borkowski and Prof. Ryszard Dudek.

Maciej Żółtowski participated in many master-courses working under supervision of notable artists like Zoltán Pesko, Lászlo Tihanyi, Yuri Simonov and Gianluigi Gelmetti.

For the artistic achievements, he received twice the Polish Ministry of Culture scholarship and the Tadeusz Baird scholarship. In 1997, he was awarded with the fellowship of the German Stiftung Kulturfonds in Künstlerhaus Schloss Wiepersdorf. In 2000, he won the scholarship for young conductors of the Japanese Music Foundation JESC. He was the winner of the first composers’ competition held by the Musica Sacra Institute in Warsaw. In 1999, he was the finalist of the Toru Takemitsu Composition Award (Tokyo). In 2002, the President of the Republic of Poland decorated him with the Silver Order of Merit. In 2017 the Polish Minister for Culture and National Heritage awarded him the Bronze Medal “Gloria Artis” for merits to culture.

Maciej Żółtowski held posts in many Polish music institutions: chairperson of the Young Circle in the Polish Composers’ Union, secretary general of the Warsaw Branch of the Polish Composers’ Union, secretary general and subsequently president of the Jeunesses Musicales Poland – the Polish section of the Jeunesses Musicales International. Since 2010 he is President of the ISCM (International Society for Contemporary Music) Polish Section.

Maciej Żółtowski collaborated with many Polish symphony orchestras including the National Symphony Orchestra of the Polish Radio (Katowice), the Polish Radio Orchestra (Warsaw), the Polish Orchestra Jeunesses Musicales, Beethoven Academy Orchestra and Poznan Philharmonic. International audiences could see Maciej Żółtowski conducting in plenty of concert halls in Europe, Asia and both Americas. His most recent engagements included: Orkestra Akademik Başkent (Ankara/Turkey), Orquesta Sinfónica de Salta (Argentina), Orquesta Sinfónica de Cuenca (Ecuador), Sinfonia Toronto (Canada), Wuhan Philharmonic Orchestra (China), Las Colinas Symphony Orchestra, Symphony Arlington, Garland Symphony Orchestra (USA), Voronezh Philharmonic Orchestra (Russia), Shumen State Symphony (Bulgaria), Orchestra Filarmonica Nino Rota (Italy), Cyprus Symphony Orchestra, Orchestra da Camera del Trasimeno (Italy), Orquesta de Cámara de Bellas Artes (Mexico), Orquesta Sinfónica del Estado de México, Orquesta Sinfónica de la Universidad de Guanajuato (Mexico), Orquesta Sinfónica de la Universidad Autónoma de Nuevo León (Mexico), Orquesta Sinfónica de Yucatán (Mexico), Krasnoyarsk Symphony Orchestra (Russia), Çukurova State Symphony Orchestra(Turkey), the Pilsen Philharmonic (Czech Republic), the Wuhan Symphony Orchestra (China), Sinfonia Finlandia Jyväskylä (Finland), Vogtland Philharmonie (Germany) and Mikkeli City Orchestra (Finland).

Appointed artistic director and conductor of the Cyprus State Orchestra (former name of the Cyprus Symphony Orchestra) in 2002, Maciej Żółtowski has developed the ensemble to high artistic standards. This has resulted in many international tours the orchestra did under his direction, visiting London, Copenhagen, Paris and Athens. In Cyprus alone, he has led over 80 concert, opera and ballet productions. His tenure ended in 2005 with a highly acclaimed “Concert for 10 pianos and orchestra” organised by the Steinway Club. In 2007-2017 Maciej Żółtowski held the post of the Managing and artistic director of the Radom Chamber Orchestra in Poland. Since 2020 he is music director of the Catskill Symphony Orchestra as well as Fenimore Chamber Orchestra (USA).

== CD recordings ==
- Grażyna Bacewicz, Works for Chamber Orchestra, vol. I, DUX 0691
- Grażyna Bacewicz, Works for Chamber Orchestra, vol. II, DUX 0701
- Krzysztof Penderecki Works For String Orchestra, DUX 0935

== Film music recordings ==
- "Reverse" by Włodek Pawlik
- "Copernicus Star" by Abel Korzeniowski
