= Elena Filonova =

French classical pianist

- Occupation: Classical pianist

Elena Filonova is a contemporary French classical pianist of Russian origin.

== Biography ==
After starting piano lessons at the age of three, she obtained the First Prize of the Concours Beethoven pour jeunes talents.

An adherent to the Heinrich Neuhaus school, Filonova had an international concert career after studying with Pavel Messner, Yevgeny Malinin, Kirill Kondrashin, Yevgeny Mravinsky and Emil Gilels.

She has recorded numerous records, including several for the Melodiya label (works by Chopin, Prokofiev, Sergei Rachmaninoff and Rodion Shchedrin).

Since 1990, Elena Filonova has been living in Paris.

In 2010, she founded her own Paris-based festival, "Harmonies d'Automne", for which she is the artistic director.

== Selected discography ==
- Works by Giovanni Bottesini, CD, with Rinat Ibragimov and the London Symphony Orchestra
- Tchaikovsky recitals, CD, Marcal Classics, 2004
- Mélodies oubliées — Arabesques, by Nikolai Medtner, CD, Ar re-se (distrib. Codaex), 2007
