= Johannes Wildner =

Austrian conductor (born 1956)

Johannes Wildner (born 1956) is an Austrian conductor, professor, and former violinist of the Vienna Philharmonic.

== Biography ==
Johannes Wildner was born in Mürzzuschlag, Austria. He studied conducting, violin, and musicology.

Wildner initially gained his experience as a member of the Vienna Philharmonic and the Vienna State Opera. After positions as chief conductor of Prague State Opera (1994–95) and first permanent conductor of Leipzig Opera (1996–98), Wildner was the general music director of the Neue Philharmonie Westfalen for ten years from 1997 until 2007.

He was the principal guest conductor of the BBC Concert Orchestra in London from 2010 to 2014. He conducted the Hong Kong Philharmonic Orchestra's "Symphony Under the Stars" New Year's Eve concert for 2013/2014. From 2014 to 2023, he was the director of the Austrian opera festival Oper Burg Gars in Gars am Kamp. From 2014 – 2023, he was also professor of conducting at the Vienna University of Music. From the 2019–2020 season to June 2024, Wildner was the chief conductor of Sønderjyllands Symphony Orchestra (Danish Philharmonic, Sønderjyllands Symfoniorkester) in Sønderborg, Denmark.

He regularly appears as a guest conductor in major opera houses such as the New National Theatre Tokyo, the Arena di Verona, Leipzig, Vienna Volksoper, Graz, Salzburg, Prague and Zagreb State Opera, and with orchestras such as the London Philharmonic Orchestra, the Royal Philharmonic Orchestra London, the Saint Petersburg Philharmonic Orchestra, the Tokyo Philharmonic Orchestra, Bavarian Radio Symphony Orchestra, the Orchestra Sinfonica Siciliana at the Teatro Politeama, Palermo, the Sofia Philharmonic, the MDR Symphony, the Dresden Philharmonic, the Vienna Symphony, the Vienna Radio Symphony Orchestra, the Bruckner Orchestra Linz, the Mozarteum Orchestra Salzburg, the Danish National Symphony Orchestra, the China Philharmonic Orchestra, and the Hong Kong Philharmonic Orchestra.

Johannes Wildner was a Professor for Orchestra Conducting at the Vienna University of Music and Performing Arts from 2014–2023.

== Recordings ==
Wildner has recorded over 100 CDs, DVDs and videos, including Johann Strauss' Die Fledermaus and Mozart's Così fan tutte, live recordings of Carmen and Le nozze di Figaro, Bruckner's Third and Ninth symphonies, and various CDs of previously unknown repertoire by Erich Zeisl, Joseph Marx and Johann Nepomuk David.

In 2010, he released a recording of Robert Schumann's complete works for piano and orchestra with pianist Lev Vinocour and the Vienna Radio Symphony Orchestra.

In 2013, he released a recording of Beethoven's violin concerto with violinist Alexandre Da Costa and Beethoven's Seventh Symphony with Taipei Symphony Orchestra, as well as recordings of works by Walter Braunfels and Frédéric d'Erlanger with the BBC Concert Orchestra.

In 2018, the first recording of Joseph Marx's "Autumn Symphony" was recorded by the Graz Philharmonic Orchestra under Johannes Wildner's baton.

== Opera Burg Gars ==
List of performances at Opera Burg Gars under Wildner's direction:

- 2014: Der Freischütz by Carl Maria von Weber
- 2015: Don Carlos by Giuseppe Verdi
- 2016: Otello by Giuseppe Verdi
- 2017: Die Zauberflöte by Wolfgang Amadeus Mozart
- 2018: Tosca by Giacomo Puccini
- 2019: Fidelio by Ludwig van Beethoven
- 2021: Die Entführung aus dem Serail by Wolfgang Amadeus Mozart
- 2022: Carmen by Georges Bizet
- 2023: Aida by Giuseppe Verdi
