= Lev Vinocour =

Russian pianist

Lev Vinocour (Russian: Лев Винокур; born 3 August 1970) is a pianist from Russia.

He began his studies at the age of six. He studied at the School of Music in Saint Petersburg and continued his studies at the Moscow Conservatory under the direction of Lev Vlassenko.

He has won prizes in many competitions, such as Busoni International Competition, International Piano Competition in Epinal, France and the Gina Bachauer International Piano Competition. He has also recorded CDs, the most known being his performance of Schumann.

From the liner notes of his new album Robert Schumann: Complete Works for Piano and Orchestra (Lev Vinocour, Johannes Wildner & ORF Vienna Radio Symphony Orchestra):

The Russian pianist is a rare species: an intellectual virtuoso. His playing combines brilliant keyboard acrobatics, a highly developed 'sound culture' and a curiosity nothing short of the philosophical. The curiosity is directed at uncovering the true, deeper meaning of the music embedded in the score, deciphering its message and translating it into plausible musical discourse. The piano prodigy from St. Petersburg made his professional concert début at the age of 13 with the Leningrad Philharmonic and Yevgeny Mravinsky. He went on to conquer the concert halls of his native Russia and, later, those of the Western world in a career that has developed serenely. This highly educated, critically alert and thoroughly self-critical artist is now one of the most highly regarded pianists of his generation. He is held in particularly high esteem by piano experts, who continually praise his ability to discover new things in familiar material.

Vinocour became German citizen in 2002.
