= Zhang Zuo (pianist) =

Chinese-American pianist

Zee Zee
- 左章
- Born: Zhang Zuo; 10 October 1988 (age 37); Shenzhen, China
- Education: Shenzhen Arts School; University of Rochester's Eastman School of Music; Juilliard School
- Occupation: Pianist
- Years active: 1998–present
- Musical career
- Genres: Classical
- Instrument: Piano
- Label: Decca Records
- Website: www.zeezee-piano.com

Zhang Zuo (Chinese: 左章; pinyin: Zuǒ Zhāng; born 10 October 1988), also known professionally as Zee Zee, is a Chinese-American pianist. She, who has won first prize awards at the 1st International Piano Competition in China, the Gina Bachauer International Artists Piano Competition in the United States, the Krainev International Piano Competition in Ukraine, and the Juilliard School's 32nd annual William Petschek Piano Recital Award.

== Early life ==
Zee Zee started her musical training at the age of five in Berlin. She enrolled later at the Shenzhen Arts School at the age of seven, and began studying with Dan Zhaoyi, a Chinese piano educator and professor. At the age of eight, she began winning competitions and gave her first concerto performance. It was then she performed the Haydn's Piano Concerto No. 11 in D major with the Shenzhen Symphony Orchestra. At the age of ten, she gave her first solo concert in Shenzhen and became a representative of the Chinese piano community.

After completing her piano studies with Dan at the Shenzhen Arts School, Zuo was invited to continue her artistic development in 2006 in the United States, where she attended the University of Rochester's Eastman School of Music under the mentorship of Nelita True for her bachelor's degree. Later, she completed her master's degree at the Juilliard School, where she studied with Robert McDonald and Yoheved Kaplinsky. In 2014, Zuo was selected to join BBC's flagship New Generation Artist (NGA) program in the UK for two seasons. She has also performed with the Cincinnati Symphony Orchestra under Paavo Järvi in Mendelssohn's first piano concerto, as well as at the Ravinia Festival. In the autumn of 2014, Zuo went on a recital tour through Italy with violinist Julian Rachlin and cellist Lynn Harrell.

Zee Zee is a founding member of the Z.E.N. Trio, alongside violinist Esther Yoo and cellist Narek Hakhnazaryan. The Z.E.N. Trio has recorded commercially for Deutsche Grammophon. Zee Zee is the founder and the artistic director of the Z+ international music festival, which takes place annually in the spring in Shanghai.

== Personal life ==
Zee Zee and her family live in Berlin. She gave birth to her first child, a daughter, in Hong Kong in 2020.
