= Meeresstille und glückliche Fahrt (Beethoven) =

Cantata by Ludwig van Beethoven

Meeresstille und Glückliche Fahrt, Op. 112 ("Calm Sea and Prosperous Voyage") is a cantata for chorus and orchestra composed by Ludwig van Beethoven. It is based on a pair of poems by Johann Wolfgang von Goethe. They met in 1812; Beethoven admired him and the work is dedicated to Goethe. It was first performed in Vienna on 25 December 1815, and first published in 1822. The piece is in a single movement, with a typical performance taking between 7 and 8 minutes. The single movement is in two sections: (1) "Meeresstille" – Sostenuto – D major; and (2) "Glückliche Fahrt" – Allegro vivace – D major.

The cantata evokes the imagery of the pair of poems which later inspired the concert overture of the same name by Mendelssohn. The poems' titles are not synonymous: in the days before steam, a totally calm sea was cause for alarm; it is only when the wind at last rises that the ship can continue on its journey. The first section depicts a ship becalmed, the second its success in resuming its voyage.

== Text ==
German	English
Meeresstille	Calm Sea
Tiefe Stille herrscht im Wasser, Ohne Regung ruht das Meer, Und bekümmert sieht der Schiffer; Glatte Fläche ringsumher. Keine Luft von keiner Seite! Todesstille fürchterlich! In der ungeheuern Weite; Reget keine Welle sich.	Deep stillness rules the water Without motion lies the sea, And worried the sailor observes Smooth surfaces all around. No air from any side! Deathly, terrible stillness! In the immense distances not a single wave stirs.
Glückliche Fahrt	Prosperous Journey
Die Nebel zerreißen, Der Himmel ist helle, Und Äolus löset Das ängstliche Band. Es säuseln die Winde, Es rührt sich der Schiffer. Geschwinde! Geschwinde! Es teilt sich die Welle, Es naht sich die Ferne; Schon seh ich das Land!	The fog is torn, The sky is bright, And Aeolus releases The fearful bindings. The winds whisper, The sailor begins to move. Swiftly! Swiftly! The waves divide, The distance nears; Already I see land!

== Instrumentation ==
The cantata is scored for the following orchestra.

- Woodwinds: 2 flutes, 2 oboes, 2 clarinets in A, 2 bassoons
- Brass: 4 horns in D and G, 2 trumpets in D
- Percussion: timpani
- Strings: violins I & II, violas, cellos, double basses
- SATB choir

== Selective list of recordings ==
- Michael Tilson Thomas, London Symphony Orchestra and Ambrosian Singers: Beethoven: Late Choral Music, CBS Records, 1975
- Claudio Abbado, Vienna Philharmonic and Vienna State Opera: Beethoven: Symphonie No. 6 'Pastorale', Deutsche Grammophon, 1987
- Robert Shaw, Atlanta Symphony Orchestra and Chorus: Beethoven: Mass in C, Elegiac Song & Calm Sea and Prosperous Voyage, Telarc, 1990
- John Eliot Gardiner, English Baroque Soloists: Messe in C, Archiv, 1992
- Matthew Best, Croydon Singers and Croydon Orchestra, Early Cantatas, Hyperion, 1997
- Richard Hickox, Collegium Music 90: Mass in C, Chandos, 2003
