= Nikolai Schukoff =

Austrian operatic tenor (born 1969)

Nikolai Andrej Schukoff (born 1969) is an Austrian operatic tenor.

== Life ==
Born in Graz, Schukoff completed his vocal studies at the Mozarteum in Salzburg with a diploma in "music-dramatic performance", for which he was awarded the Lilli Lehmann Medal in 1996. He made his debut the same year as Alfredo in Verdi's La traviata at the Musiktheater im Revier in Gelsenkirchen. Afterwards he worked some years at the Nationaltheater Mannheim and at the Staatstheater Nürnberg.

From 2006, he mainly performed in heldentenor roles, leading to his international breakthrough, including Siegmund in Wagner's Die Walküre, the title role in Weber's Der Freischütz and Bacchus in Ariadne auf Naxos by Richard Strauss. His repertoire also contains Italian and French works.

Schukoff works freelance and has had engagements at the Opéra National de Paris, the Metropolitan Opera in New York and the Bayerische Staatsoper, among others.

He also works as a concert singer, for example in the role of Waldemar in Schönberg's Gurre-Lieder at the Wiener Musikverein conducted by Zubin Mehta.

== Roles ==
- Beethoven: Fidelio – Florestan
- Bellini: Norma – Pollione
- Bizet: Carmen – Don José
- Janáček: Jenůfa – Števa Buryja
- Kálmán: Gräfin Mariza – Tassilo
- Lehár: The Merry Widow – Danilo
- Verdi: Attila – Foresto
- Verdi: La traviata – Alfredo
- Wagner: Der fliegende Holländer – Erik
- Wagner: Das Rheingold – Loge
- Wagner: Die Walküre – Siegmund
- Wagner: Parsifal – Parsifal
- Weber: Der Freischütz – Max
- Strauss: Die Fledermaus – Eisenstein
