= Alexander Lubyantsev =

Russian pianist and composer (born 1986)

- Born: December 27, 1986 (age 38); Roshchino, Leningrad Oblast, Soviet Union
- Genres: Classical
- Occupation(s): Pianist, Composer
- Instrument: Piano
- Website: https://lubyantsev.info

Alexander Mikhailovich Lubyantsev (Russian: Александр Михайлович Лубянцев, Aleksandr Mikhailovich Lubiantsev, also transliterated Lubiantcev, born 27 December 1986) is a Russian pianist and composer. He is a laureate of the 2004 Sydney International Piano Competition and the 2007 International Tchaikovsky Competition, at which he received the bronze medal, no gold awarded, and has also been a prizewinner in over ten other piano competitions. His performance at the 2011 Tchaikovsky Competition and the ensuing events are also quite significant.

At this competition, a notable outcry and vivid protests by audience members and music critics after Lubyantsev's exit led the critics to institute their own additional prize with the support of the Mikhail Prokhorov Foundation for Cultural Initiatives. Lubyantsev won this new award with the most votes. This Special Prize of the Moscow Music Critics' Association has continued to be awarded in subsequent editions. The events surrounding Lubyantsev received attention in the national and international press, where he was referred to as “one of the audience’s favorites” and “the cause of the most controversy.” One journalist drew a parallel with Ivo Pogorelich’s famed appearance in the 1980 Chopin Competition. (Note: This comparison was first uttered humorously by the interviewer during a radio interview with Mikhail Voskresensky. Voskresensky concurred.)

Lubyantsev has been invited to perform in various countries, including France, Germany, Italy, USA, Japan, China, South Korea, and South Africa. He has performed in venues such as Suntory and Nikkei Halls in Japan, the Fazioli Concert Hall, Hamburg's Elbphilharmonie, the Tchaikovsky Hall of the Moscow Philharmonic, and the Concert Hall of the Mariinsky Theater, and with conductors such as Gianandrea Noseda, Christoph Poppen, János Fürst, Maxim Fedotov, Vladimir Spivakov, Carlos Miguel Prieto, Mikhail Tatarnikov, and Dima Slobodeniouk.

== Biography ==
=== Early life ===
Alexander Lubyantsev was born 1986 in the village of Roschino (Leningrad Region), Russia, where his father was the director of a local music school. His mother and older siblings were pianists. After beginning to learn the piano from his mother at a very early age, he began to study in music schools in Saint Petersburg at age 5, and during childhood he began to perform in public.

He first performed with orchestra at age 11, playing Chopin Piano Concerto no. 1 at a competition in Moscow. At age 14 he played Rachmaninov Piano Concerto no. 2 in his first regular concert with orchestra in the Russian city of Saratov and began to give concerts throughout the country.

His teacher at the Moscow Central Music School was Kira Shashkina, who was a teacher of Mikhail Pletnev. Other teachers include James Tocco at the Hochschule für Musik in Lübeck, Germany, Nina Seregina at the Saint Petersburg Conservatory, and Viktor Portnoy at the Petrozavodsk Conservatory.

At age 8 he first won a piano competition and over the next years he went on to win over twelve prizes. At age 17 he took fifth prize at the 2004 Sydney International Piano Competition, where he also received two Special Prizes: one for the “Best Performance of a Study by Liszt” and one for the “Best Performance of a work by Liszt (excluding Studies).”

=== 2007 Tchaikovsky Competition ===
In 2007, he was awarded third prize at the XIII International Tchaikovsky Competition. No first prize was awarded. He was twenty years old at the time.

Reporting on the competition in the Russian newspaper Pravda, music critic Natalya Zimyanina wrote: “Lubyantsev won the first two rounds, all the while smiling with the joy of sharing his pristine emotions with the public in the magnificent Great Hall of the [Moscow] Conservatory, where the audience listened to him with their breath held.” However, according to her, the third round did not go as well because the orchestra did not give way to him sufficiently “in the places where he was used to playing intimately, in his own way.”

According to Zimyanina, “no one had really heard of him before” and “he had no partisans on the jury.” Likewise, she had "the impression that he didn’t care much about the outcome.” Nonetheless, “the hall immediately fell in love with this delicate, young man, who lacked the affectations of a hardened performer, calling him an ‘angel.’... [He] was one of the most unusual pianists of the competition, and he became its revelation and discovery.”

=== 2011 Tchaikovsky Competition ===
In 2011 he returned to compete in the XIV International Tchaikovsky Competition. Evidently remembering him from the previous edition, the audience greeted him with a standing ovation upon his first entrance on stage, and after his first-round performance called him back for three bows. Russian daily Rossiiskaya Gazeta commented that from the beginning “the crowd effectively greeted him as the victor.” Asked about the enthusiasm the public showed him at the outset, Lubyantsev answered: “It was very pleasing and very unexpected for me, and so it was surprisingly easy to play freely, despite the fact that I had gotten sick several days before.”

The Guardian, calling him one of the “favorites” of the “fervent Muscovite public,” described how, backstage after his performance in the second stage of the semifinal, “Lubyantsev was mobbed like a pop star by groups of photographers, journalists and teenage girls.” A description of the events in the magazine Snob recounted how, as the names of those to continue to the final round were read out without his, “a dense crowd of curious visitors to the competition gathered around him” and this “ovation” lasted twenty minutes.

Chronicles of the public's behavior towards jury members appeared in the British newspapers The Guardian and The Times: After the announcement of the five pianists to play in the final round, “the jury were booed inside and outside the hall.” As jury member and Tchaikovsky competition laureate Peter Donohoe left the building following the decision, the awaiting public shouted at him “Shame! It’s the wrong decision!” Jury member Barry Douglas, who was the competition winner in 1986, tweeted “One audience member bounded over to me as I left the building saying 'shame on you' and 'do you think that Lubyantsev is not a good pianist?'.” “I was walking to a restaurant with Michel Béroff [another juror],” said Douglas, “A woman followed us, chanting ‘Lubyantsev, Lubyantsev’. I found that creepy. And after we announced the finalists there were cries of ‘Shame on you’.”

Speaking later in an interview, another eliminated competitor recounted that not reaching the final and hearing the crowd in the foyer chanting “Lubyantsev” was a “double blow” and a “priceless experience in how to hold inside oneself the pressure of the circumstances.” Music critic Yaroslav Timofeev, writing in the Russian newspaper Izvestiya, wrote that at the closing concert, cries of the name “Lubyantsev” could be heard from the gallery. (Note: Timofeev posited that part of the furor behind the “revolution” caused by Lubyanstev’s elimination was connected with the fact that many of his supporters felt he should have been awarded a higher prize at the previous competition.)

The Times reported that Valery Gergiev, the chairman of the organizing committee, was “forced” to call a press conference “to answer the press outcry about the piano jury’s decisions.” The Guardian stated: “Lubyantsev’s departure caused the most controversy,” and reported Gergiev's comment: “We cannot ignore the audience’s reaction.” The day after Lubyantsev's “defeat” he received an invitation from Gergiev to appear in the Concert Hall of the Mariinsky Theater.

The Russian critics present initiated a “Critics’ Prize.” Although unsuccessful in their bid to have the prize officially sanctioned by the organizing committee, the Mikhail Prokhorov Foundation for Cultural Initiatives sponsored the award. The award was in recognition of “clear artistic individuality and a fresh approach to the art of performing” and limited only to the piano competition. Twenty-four professional music critics voted and Lubyantsev won with 58.33% of the votes.

Regarding his decision to compete in the 2011 competition and its outcome, Lubyantsev commented in an interview: “Before the competition I thought a lot about whether it makes sense to go or not. The last time I got a prize, and it would be horrible to throw it all away. And, in the end, that’s what happened: I lost. But, on the other hand, the number of invitations I’ve received now are three-hundred times greater than after the previous [Tchaikovsky] competition.” In another interview he stated: “Everything that happened at this contest became the culminating moment of my life. When I decided to participate in the eliminatory round, I didn’t know if it would have significance for me or not. It could have ended up having no significance, but it turned out to be the opposite.”

=== Since 2011 ===
Within several days of the Tchaikovsky Competition's end, he debuted with the Orchestra of the Mariinsky Theater in a concert conducted by Gianandrea Noseda, and shortly after performed Rachmaninov Piano Concerto no. 3 with the National Philharmonic of Russia under the baton of Vladimir Spivakov in the festival Vladimir Spivakov Invites. He toured Japan with the National Symphony Orchestra of Belarus, playing Tchaikovsky Piano Concerto no. 1 and Rachmaninov Piano Concerto no. 3. He has continued to appear in the Concert Hall of the Mariinsky Theater and in the Saint Petersburg Philharmonic Hall. In this hall he substituted for pianist Boris Berezovsky on two hours’ notice in July 2015. His U.S. debut in 2014 with the Seattle Philharmonic Orchestra received highly positive reviews. In 2019 he performed at the Elbphilharmonie in Hamburg, Germany.

== Reviews and Criticism ==
=== 2007 Tchaikovsky Competition ===
Pianist, pedagogue, and jury member Dmitri Bashkirov described Lubyantsev's playing as having a “fresh and fantastical manner.”

The critic Natalya Zimyanina in the newspaper Pravda wrote:

The hall immediately fell in love with this delicate, young man, who lacked the affectations of a hardened performer, calling him ‘an angel.’… Lubyantsev was one of the most unusual pianists of the competition, and he became its revelation and discovery…Lubyantsev is principally a re-transmitter of feelings about which we, in our cruel age, have even forgotten to think[…]

=== 2011 Tchaikovsky Competition ===
Speaking in a radio interview after the competition, critic Yuliya Bederova said that Lubyantsev has a “striking and unusual sound” which is “controversial: some are disconcerted by it, while others are captivated and enchanted…” She continued:

One can hear that he is unusual; yet, he is not extravagant. He doesn’t buy off the audience with affectations or mannerisms, or with some kind of special intellectualism. His unique and particular approach to music is completely honest and in some senses naïve and simple; however, intellect is quite present in his playing. He hasn’t grown out of a rejection of the tradition; rather, one finds him in a very deep and heated dialogue with it, and one can hear this. He possesses an extraordinary gift to take the audience along as his accomplice, not bribing them, not conquering them, but rather leading them until suddenly the whole hall has become his accomplice in a tale of his rapport with Chopin, or with Scriabin.

Speaking in a radio interview after the competition, jury member Mikhail Voskresensky commented: “Lubyantsev played a very strange version of Mozart Piano Concerto no. 21;” however, he continued:

I supported him a lot…He was collected. He was professional. He played very purely…He is a very talented person, and therefore I believe his fortunes will turn out fine. I think that what was, in my opinion, an error of the jury could turn out to be more beneficial to him…As happened with Pogorelich. (Note: Voskresensky recounted that, even though a majority of the jury members did not “like” Lubyantsev, many in fact did “like” him. Later in the interview and not specifically in reference to Lubyantsev, Voskresensky commented: “It was very distressing to me when the people I had dreamt of seeing in the final didn’t make it…The jury, in spite of the summons to choose strong individuality, instead chose highly professional, accurately playing musicians.”)

Despite his enthusiastic comment about Lubyantsev following the 2007 Tchaikovsky Competition, Dmitri Bashkirov, in a radio interview after the 2011 competition, was more cautious. Although he concurred that Lubyantsev is “incredibly talented” and “incredibly original,” he feared the limitations that may be caused by Lubyantsev's “stubbornness” as regards the “theatrical nature” of interpreting various roles in music. Nonetheless, he concluded: “[Lubyantsev] is an incredibly interesting personality and I understand the audience’s enthusiasm, but truth is worth more.” (Note: When the interviewer posited that this is a question of “not all artists' being universal,” Bashkirov responded that he was not talking about “universality.” However, this may seem contradictory. Later in the interview, Bashkirov emphasized: “A universal artist will never be the most interesting. Was Glenn Gould universal? Was Yudina or Sofronitsky? Consider a landscape painting…it’s beautiful and flowing. But it’s not the most interesting. It’s not what sticks in the minds and souls of the listeners.”)

Music critic Yaroslav Timofeev in the newspaper Izvestiya wrote: “Lubyantsev plays maturely from the point of view of technical expertise and comprehension of the musical text,” but it was his “childlike whimsicality and discernible ego” that “simultaneously won over the public and scared off the jury.”

Elena Chishkovskaya writing in the newspaper Rossiiskaya Gazeta, wrote:

The audience remembered him [from the previous competition] as an exceptionally gifted pianist whose mastery of sound and ability to penetrate to the core of the music he is playing evoked comparisons with Richter and Pletnev.

Music critic Maria Zueva in the newspaper Rossiiskaya Gazeta wrote:

In his interpretation no detail is by accident, but at the same time, his interpretation consists of completely unexpected, novel, and justified solutions.

=== Other ===
Music critic Melinda Bargreen of The Seattle Times wrote of Lubyantsev's performance of Tchaikovsky's First Piano Concerto with the Seattle Philharmonic Orchestra:

Lubyantsev can play fast and loud with the best of them, but he also has a highly distinctive way with a phrase, and plays some of his solo passages so delicately that they sound like a private reverie. His technique is dazzling, with octaves of staggering speed and fingerwork of brilliant accuracy.

Of the same performance, critic Philppa Kiraly wrote:

[H]e does not force the sound out, but allows it to happen easily with a fine light touch and mastery of the notes. The concerto pulsed with rhythm and energy, one gorgeous melody following another, tender, lively, romantic, or furiously fast… [a] superb pianist with a deep understanding of the composer, giving a sense of the music and the composer’s wishes first, not a bombastic, self-aggrandizing approach.

== Compositions ==
Lubyantsev is known to play his own compositions as encores.

== Awards ==
- 1995 – 1st prize, International Brothers and Sisters pianists´ competition, St. Petersburg (Russia);
- 1997 – 1st prize, International Competition of Young Composers (Russia);
- 1997 – 2nd prize, International Young Pianists´ Competition (Poland);
- 1998 – 2nd prize, International Rachmaninov Young Pianists´ Competition (Russia);
- 2001 – Grand-Prix, International Chopin Young Pianists´ Competition (Estonia);
- 2002 – 1st prize, International Young Pianists´ Competition Steps to Success, St. Petersburg (Russia);
- 2004 – 5th prize, Sydney International Piano Competition (Australia);
- 2004 – Special Prize for the Best Performance a Study by Liszt, Sydney International Piano Competition (Australia);
- 2004 – Special Prize for the Best Performance of a work by Liszt (excluding Studies), Sydney International Piano Competition (Australia);
- Recipient of an EMCY certificate from the Order of Prometheus (London);
- 2007 – Bronze Medal, XIII International Tchaikovsky Competition (Moscow);
- 2007 – grant-recipient of the St. Petersburg House of Music;
- 2007 – 1st prize, Russian Music Competition, Ruza (Russia);
- 2008 – Golden Diploma, “Golden Trophy” International Web Concert Hall Competition, New York City (USA);
- 2011 – Special Critics’ Prize awarded at the XIX International Tchaikovsky Competition by the Moscow Music Critics Association in collaboration with the Mikhail Prokhorov Foundation (Russia)
