= Peter and the Wolf =

1936 composition by Sergei Prokofiev

- A Symphonic Tale for Children
- by Sergei Prokofiev
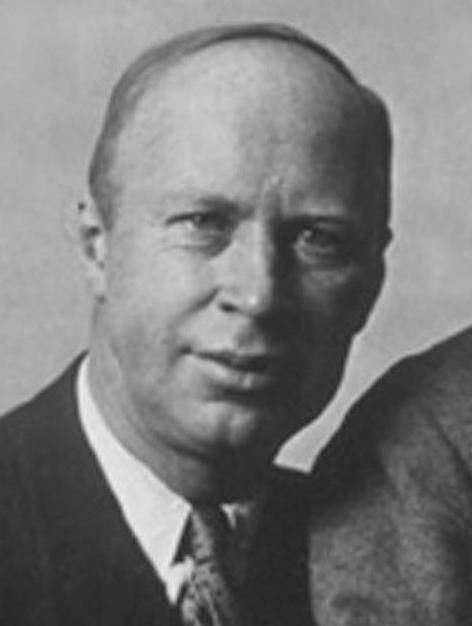
- Sergei Prokofiev, 1936
- Native name: Петя и волк
- Opus: 67
- Commissioned by: Natalya Sats
- Text: Sergei Prokofiev
- Language: Russian
- Composed: 1936
- Dedication: Prokoviev's children
- Duration: c. 25 minutes

Premiere
- Date: 2 May 1936
- Location: Large Hall of the Moscow Conservatory; Moscow, Russian SFSR
- Conductor: Sergei Prokofiev
- Performers: T. Bobrov (narrator); Orchestra of the Moscow Philharmonic Society

Peter and the Wolf (Russian: Пе́тя и волк, romanized: Pétya i volk, IPA: [ˈpʲetʲə i voɫk]), Op. 67, a "symphonic tale for children", is a programmatic musical composition written by Sergei Prokofiev in 1936. The narrator tells a Russian folk tale, which the orchestra illustrates by using different instruments to play themes that represent each character in the story.

== Background ==
In 1936, Prokofiev was commissioned by Natalya Sats, the director of the Central Children's Theatre in Moscow, to write a musical symphony for children. Sats and Prokofiev had become acquainted after he visited the theatre with his sons several times. The intent was to introduce children to the individual instruments of the orchestra to enjoy music and learn to recognize musical keys.

The first draft of the libretto was about a Young Pioneer, Peter, who rights a wrong by challenging an adult. But Prokofiev was dissatisfied with the rhyming text by Nina Sakonskaya (real name Antonia Pavlovna Sokolovskaya), a then-popular children's author. He wrote a libretto in which Peter and his animal friends capture a wolf. As well as promoting desired Pioneer virtues such as vigilance, bravery, and resourcefulness, the plot illustrates Soviet themes such as the stubbornness of the un-Bolshevik older generation (the grandfather) and the triumph of Man (Peter) taming Nature (the wolf).

Prokofiev produced a version for piano in under a week, finishing it on 15 April. The orchestration was finished on 24 April. The work premiered at a children's concert in the main hall of the Moscow Conservatory with the Orchestra of the Moscow Philharmonic Society on 2 May 1936. Sats was ill, the substitute narrator was inexperienced, and the performance attracted little attention. Later that month, a more successful performance with Sats narrating was given at the Moscow Pioneers Palace. The U.S. premiere took place in March 1938, with Prokofiev conducting the Boston Symphony Orchestra at Symphony Hall, and with Richard Hale narrating. By that time, Sats was serving a sentence in the gulag, where she was sent after her lover, Marshal Mikhail Tukhachevsky, was shot in June 1937.

== Synopsis ==
Peter (Russian: Petya), a Soviet Young Pioneer, lives at his grandfather's home in a forest clearing. One day, he goes out into the clearing, leaving the garden gate open, and a duck that lives in the yard takes the opportunity to swim in a pond nearby. The duck and a bird argue over whether a bird should be able to swim or fly. A local cat stalks them quietly, and the bird—warned by Peter—flies to safety in a tall tree while the duck swims to safety in the middle of the pond.

Peter's grandfather scolds him for staying outside and playing in the meadow alone, because a wolf might attack him. When Peter shows defiance, believing he has nothing to fear from wolves, his grandfather takes him back into the house and locks the gate. Soon afterward, a ferocious wolf comes out of the forest. The cat quickly climbs into the tree with the bird, but the duck, who has jumped out of the pond, is chased, overtaken, and swallowed by the wolf, who then begins prowling around the tree's base.

Seeing all of this from inside, Peter fetches a rope and climbs over the garden wall into the tree. He asks the bird to fly around the wolf's head to distract him, while he lowers a noose and catches the wolf by his tail. The wolf struggles to get free, but Peter ties the rope to the tree and the noose only gets tighter.

Hunters who have been tracking the wolf come out of the forest with their guns ready, but Peter gets them to instead help him take it to a zoo in a victory parade (the piece was first performed for an audience of Young Pioneers during May Day celebrations) that includes himself, the bird, the hunters leading the wolf, the cat, and lastly his grumbling grandfather, still disappointed that Peter ignored his warnings, but proud that he caught the wolf.

At the end, the narrator says that careful listeners can hear the duck still quacking inside the wolf's belly, because she was swallowed whole.

== Performance directions ==
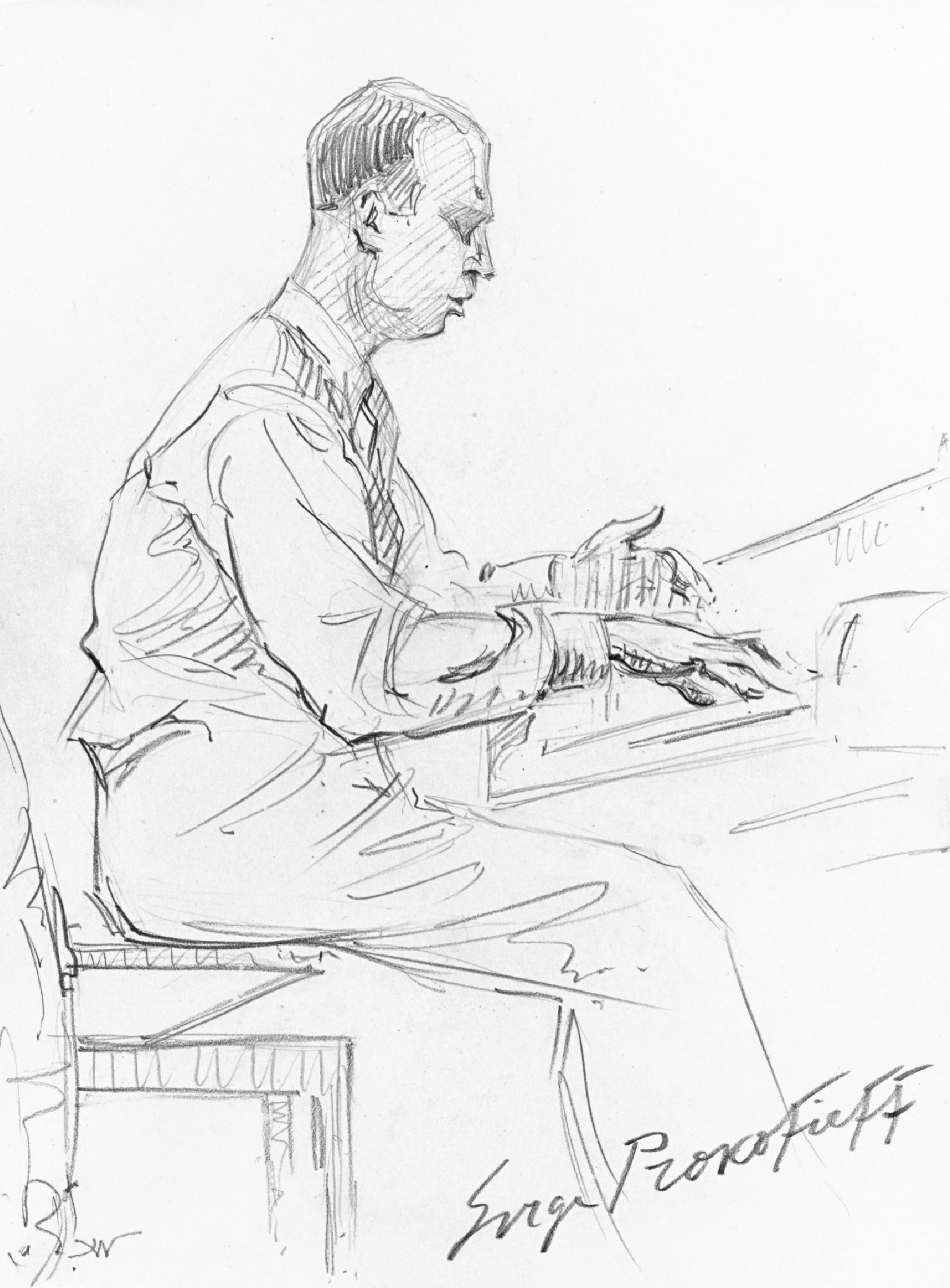
Prokofiev at the piano (drawn by Hilda Wiener, 1936)

Prokofiev produced detailed performance notes in English and Russian. According to the English version:

Each character of this tale is represented by a corresponding instrument in the orchestra: the bird by a flute, the duck by an oboe, the cat by a clarinet playing staccato in a low register, the grandfather by a bassoon, the wolf by three horns, Peter by the string quartet, the shooting of the hunters by the kettle drums and bass drum. Before an orchestral performance it is desirable to show these instruments to the children and to play on them the corresponding leitmotivs. Thereby, the children learn to distinguish the sonorities of the instruments during the performance of this tale.

== Instrumentation ==
Peter and the Wolf is scored for an orchestra:

- Woodwinds: a flute, an oboe, a clarinet in A, and a bassoon
- Brass: 3 horns in F, a trumpet in B♭ and a trombone
- Percussion: timpani, a triangle, a tambourine, cymbals, castanets, a snare drum, and a bass drum
- Strings: first and second violins, violas, violoncellos, and double basses

Each character in the story has a particular instrument and musical theme:

Bird
Flute
Duck
Oboe
Cat
Clarinet
Grandfather
Bassoon
Wolf
French horns
Hunters
woodwind and trumpet theme, with gunshots on timpani and bass drum
Peter
string instruments (including violin, viola, cello, and double bass)

A performance lasts about 25 minutes.

== Recordings ==
Jeremy Nicholas wrote for classical music magazine Gramophone in 2015, claiming that the best overall recording of Peter and the Wolf was by the New Philharmonia Orchestra, narrated by Richard Baker and conducted by Raymond Leppard in 1971. Gramophone's best DVD version is the 2006 film by Suzie Templeton; its music is performed, without narrator, by the Philharmonia Orchestra conducted by Mark Stephenson.

| Year | Narrator | Orchestra | Conductor | Label | Notes |
|---|---|---|---|---|---|
| 1939 | Richard Hale | Boston Symphony Orchestra | Serge Koussevitzky | RCA Victor, DM 566 | Set of 3 shellac 12" discs |
| 1941 | Basil Rathbone | All-American Orchestra | Leopold Stokowski | Columbia Masterworks, M 477 | Set of 3 shellac 12" discs, restored from original Masterworks set by Bob Varney |
| 1949 | Sterling Holloway | Graunke Symphony Orchestra | Kurt Graunke | RCA Victor, WY 386 | Set of 2 vinyl 10" discs, together with a Little Nipper Storybook from Disney; originally made for an episode in the 1946 film Make Mine Music |
| 1949 | Frank Phillips | London Philharmonic Orchestra | Nikolai Malko | London Records, LPS 151 | Frank Phillips was a well-known BBC Radio newsreader |
| 1950 | Eleanor Roosevelt | Boston Symphony Orchestra | Serge Koussevitzky | RCA Victor Red Seal, LM 45 | mono recording; never reissued on CD |
| 1950 | Milton Cross | Lucy Brown, piano | | Musicraft Records, M 65 | 4 shellac 10" 78-rpm discs |
| 1953 | Alec Guinness | Boston Pops Orchestra | Arthur Fiedler | RCA Victor Red Seal, LM 1761 | |
| 1953 | Victor Jory | Peter Pan Orchestra | Vicky Kosen | Peter Pan Records | mono recording; has never been issued on CD |
| 1954 | Richard Hale | Boston Pops Orchestra | Arthur Fiedler | RCA Victor Red Seal; LM 1803 | |
| 1955 | Henry Morgan | Netherlands Philharmonic Orchestra | Otto Ackermann | Concert Hall, MMS 88E | The Netherlands Philharmonic Orchestra is named on this record "Concert Hall Symphony Orchestra". |
| 1955 | Arthur Godfrey | Andre Kostelanetz's Orchestra | Andre Kostelanetz | Columbia Records | mono recording; has never been issued on CD |
| 1955 | Brandon deWilde | Pro Musica Symphony, Vienna | Hans Swarowsky | Vox Records | PL9280 (mono), STPL59280 (stereo). Matrix VS3076 |
| 1956 | Peter Ustinov | Philharmonia Orchestra | Herbert von Karajan | Angel Records | |
| 1957 | Cyril Ritchard | Philadelphia Orchestra | Eugene Ormandy | Columbia Records, ML 5183 | |
| 1957 | Boris Karloff | Vienna State Opera Orchestra | Mario Rossi | Vanguard Records | |
| 1959 | Michael Flanders | Philharmonia Orchestra | Efrem Kurtz | EMI Records | |
| 1959 | José Ferrer | Vienna State Opera Orchestra | Sir Eugene Goossens | Kapp Records | Narrated in Spanish and English |
| 1959 | Richard Attenborough | Philharmonia of Hamburg | Hans-Jürgen Walter | World Record Club, SC-28 | |
| 1960 | Beatrice Lillie | London Symphony Orchestra | Skitch Henderson | Decca Records | |
| 1960 | Captain Kangaroo | Stadium Symphony Orchestra of New York | Leopold Stokowski | Everest Records, SDBR-3043 | |
| 1960 | Leonard Bernstein | New York Philharmonic | Leonard Bernstein | Columbia Records | The popularity of the group's televised Young People's Concerts made this an auspicious release. In the French release the narrator is Alban Liebl, in the German Matthias Ernst Holzmann and in the Portuguese Roberto Carlos. |
| 1960 | Garry Moore | Philharmonic Symphony Orchestra of London | Artur Rodziński | Whitehall, XWN 18525 | The reverse side of this 12-inch LP record also features The Carnival of the Animals by Saint-Saëns with Garry Moore (narrator), Josef and Grete Dichler (duo pianists), and the Vienna State Opera Orchestra conducted by Hermann Scherchen. |
| 1961 | Carlos Pellicer | Orquesta Sinfónica de México | Carlos Chávez | Mexican Columbia, MC 1360 | |
| 1962 | Kenneth Horne | Netherlands Philharmonic Orchestra | Otto Ackermann | Concert Hall, CM 88E | |
| 1963 | Alec Clunes | French National Orchestra | Lorin Maazel | Deutsche Grammophon | In the French release the narrator is Madeleine Renaud, in the German Mathias Wieman, in the Italian Eduardo De Filippo, in the Spanish Juan Pulido and in the Japanese Tetsuko Kuroyanagi. |
| 1963 | Eric Shilling | Czech Philharmonic Orchestra | Karel Ančerl | Supraphon; SU3676-2 | |
| 1964 | Harpo Marx | Riverside Symphony Concert | | Ramseur Records | Benefit performance featuring the rarely recorded voice of the famously mute comedian Harpo Marx, recorded six months before his death. Released on vinyl and CD in 2026. |
| 1965 | Lorne Greene | London Symphony Orchestra | Sir Malcolm Sargent | RCA Victor Red Seal; LSC 2783 | |
| 1965 | Sean Connery | Royal Philharmonic Orchestra | Antal Doráti | Phase 4 Stereo | |
| 1967 | Eric Robinson | Royal Philharmonic Orchestra | James Walker | Reader's Digest, RD4-710-1 | |
| 1968 | Robie Lester | Graunke Symphony Orchestra | Kurt Graunke | Disneyland | originally from the 1946 film Make Mine Music |
| 1969 | Paul Daneman | The Little Symphony Of London | Arthur Davison | Music for Pleasure | The reverse side of this recording is Sleigh Ride (dance 3 of Three German Dances by Wolfgang Amadeus Mozart), and Toy Symphony (generally attributed to Leopold Mozart). |
| 1970 | Sir Ralph Richardson | London Symphony Orchestra | Sir Malcolm Sargent | Decca Records | Volume 5 of The World of the Great Classics series. This version is praised in various editions of The Stereo Record Guide as the finest recording and narration of the work ever made. |
| 1971 | Richard Baker | New Philharmonia Orchestra | Raymond Leppard | EMI | |
| 1972 | George Raft | London Festival Orchestra | Stanley Black | Phase 4 Stereo, SPC-21084 | In this version, the story is reformulated as a gangster tale in the style of the Hollywood films that Raft had once acted in. |
| 1972 | Rob Reiner | studio orchestra | Jerry Yester | United Artists Records, UAS-5646 | Contemporary version by Carl Gottlieb and Rob Reiner; never released on CD |
| 1973 | Mia Farrow | London Symphony Orchestra | André Previn | EMI, ASD 2935 | |
| 1973 | Alec McCowen | Royal Concertgebouw Orchestra | Bernard Haitink | Philips Records, 6599 436 | The German release featured Hermann Prey as narrator. |
| 1974 | Will Geer | English Chamber Orchestra | Johannes Somary | Vanguard Records, VSO-30033 | |
| 1975 | Viv Stanshall | various rock musicians, including Manfred Mann, Gary Moore, Phil Collins, Brian Eno, Gary Brooker, Bill Bruford, Cozy Powell, Chris Spedding, Alvin Lee, and Julie Tippett | | Esoteric Recordings (remastered and re-released November 2021 as ECLEC2781) | Billed as a 'rock version' of Prokofiev's work |
| 1975 | Hermione Gingold | Vienna Philharmonic Orchestra | Karl Böhm | Deutsche Grammophon | The original German LP release featured Karlheinz Böhm as narrator (2530 587). The UK, and Australian releases featured Hermione Gingold (2530 588). The French release featured narrator Jean Richard (2530 640). |
| 1977 | Angela Rippon | Royal Philharmonic Orchestra | Owain Arwel Hughes | Enigma Records Limited, K 53553 | |
| 1978 | David Bowie | Philadelphia Orchestra | Eugene Ormandy | RCA Red Seal | Bowie's recording reached number 136 on the US Pop Albums chart. |
| 1979 | Carol Channing | Cincinnati Pops Orchestra | Erich Kunzel | Caedmon Records, TC-1623 | |
| 1980 | Tom Seaver | Cincinnati Pops Orchestra | Erich Kunzel | MMG | |
| 1984 | Dudley Moore, Terry Wogan | Boston Pops Orchestra | John Williams | Philips Records | The American release (412 559–2) was narrated by Dudley Moore, while the UK release (412 556–2) featured Terry Wogan as narrator. |
| 1984 | William F. Buckley Jr. | RTL Orchestra Luxembourg | Leopold Hager | Proarte Digital Records | |
| 1986 | Itzhak Perlman | Israel Philharmonic Orchestra | Zubin Mehta | EMI | EMI/Angel also released an LP and later a CD with Perlman narrating in Hebrew. |
| 1987 | André Previn | Royal Philharmonic Orchestra | André Previn | Telarc, CD 80126 | |
| 1987 | Lina Prokofiev | Royal Scottish National Orchestra | Neeme Järvi | Chandos Records, ABRD 1221 | Lina Prokofiev was Sergei Prokofiev's first wife |
| 1987 | Paul Hogan | Orchestre de Paris | Igor Markevitch | EMI | It retained the traditional plot but transferred the locale to the Australian Outback. This recording was withdrawn soon after its release because of unflattering portrayals of Australia's aboriginal people and is now considered "out of print". |
| 1988 | "Weird Al" Yankovic | LSI Philharmonic | Wendy Carlos | CBS Records | Released as an orchestral comic adaptation of the story, narrated by "Weird Al" Yankovic. This also features "The Carnival of the Animals – Part Two", a parody of The Carnival of the Animals. |
| 1989 | Jonathan Winters | Philharmonia Orchestra | Efrem Kurtz | Angel Records | |
| 1989 | Sir Peter Ustinov | Philharmonia Orchestra | Philip Ellis | Cirrus Classics, CRS CD 105 | |
| 1989 | Jeremy Nicholas | Czecho-Slovak Radio Symphony Orchestra | Ondrej Lenárd | Naxos Records | |
| 1989 | Christopher Lee | English String Orchestra | Sir Yehudi Menuhin | Nimbus Records | |
| 1989 | Sir John Gielgud | Orchestra of the Academy of London | Richard Stamp | Virgin Classics | Sir John's royalties for this recording were donated to The League of Friends of Charity Heritage, a facility for physically handicapped children. |
| 1989 | Noni Hazlehurst | Sydney Symphony Orchestra | Stuart Challender | ABC Records | Hazlehurst also narrated the Saint-Saëns/Ogden Nash The Carnival of the Animals on the same album |
| 1990 | Sting | Chamber Orchestra of Europe | Claudio Abbado | Deutsche Grammophon | CD, EAN 0028942939622. This was used in 1993 as the soundtrack to the television special Peter and the Wolf: A Prokofiev Fantasy. The French release features Charles Aznavour as narrator, the Italian Roberto Benigni, the Spanish José Carreras, the German Barbara Sukowa (EAN 0028942939424). |
| 1991 | Oleg and Gabriel Prokofiev | New London Orchestra | Ronald Corp | Hyperion Records | The narrators were the son and grandson of the composer. |
| 1991 | Dom DeLuise | The Little Orchestra Society | Dino Anagnost | Musicmasters Classics, MMD 67067 | This was part of the album called "Three Children's Classics". |
| 1991 | Jack Lemmon | Prague Festival Orchestra | Pavel Urbanek | Delta/Laserlight | CD, EAN 0018111538626 |
| 1992 | Phillip Schofield | Orchestre du Capitole de Toulouse | Michel Plasson | EMI | CD, CDC-7-54730-2 |
| 1993 | Peter Schickele | Atlanta Symphony Orchestra | Yoel Levi | Telarc | With a new text by Peter Schickele. |
| 1994 | Patrick Stewart | Orchestra of the Opéra National de Lyon | Kent Nagano | Erato | |
| 1994 | Melissa Joan Hart | Boston Symphony Orchestra | Seiji Ozawa | Sony Classical | Hart was in her "Clarissa" persona from the Nickelodeon television series Clarissa Explains It All. |
| 1994 | Sir John Gielgud | Royal Philharmonic Orchestra | Andrea Licata | Intersound Recordings | |
| 1995 | Kirstie Alley | RCA Symphony Orchestra | George Daugherty | Sony Masterworks | From the Chuck Jones TV special Peter and the Wolf |
| 1996 | Ben Kingsley | London Symphony Orchestra | Sir Charles Mackerras | Cala Records | |
| 1997 | Dame Edna Everage | Melbourne Symphony Orchestra | John Lanchbery | Naxos Records | |
| 1997 | Anthony Dowell | | Ross MacGibbon, director (video) | | Film of a ballet performance, starring David Johnson, Layla Harrison, Karan Lingham |
| 2000 | David Attenborough | BBC Philharmonic | Yan Pascal Tortelier | BBC Music | for BBC Music Magazine; a free CD came with the June 2000 issue |
| 2000 | Lenny Henry | Nouvel Ensemble Instrumental Du Conservatoire National Supérieur De Paris | Jacques Pési | EMI | |
| 2001 | Sharon Stone | Orchestra of St. Luke's | James Levine | Deutsche Grammophon | as part of A Classic Tale: Music for Our Children (289 471 171–72, 2001) |
| 2001 | Joey Mazzarino as Papa Bear | The Boston Pops Orchestra | Keith Lockhart | Sony Wonder | as part of Elmo's Musical Adventure |
| 2003 | Antonio Banderas, Sophia Loren | Russian National Orchestra | Kent Nagano | PENTATONE, PTC 5186014 | In Spanish |
| 2003 | Mikhail Gorbachev, Bill Clinton, Sophia Loren | Russian National Orchestra | Kent Nagano | PENTATONE, PTC 5186011 | Released as Wolf Tracks and Peter and the Wolf. Loren narrated Peter and the Wolf, Clinton narrated Wolf Tracks (composed by Jean-Pascal Beintus with text by Walt Kraemer), and Gorbachev narrated the Introduction, Intermezzo, and Epilogue. The album won the Grammy Award for Best Spoken Word Album for Children. |
| 2004 | Bradley Cole | Polish Chamber Philharmonic Orchestra Sopot, Ladies Swing Quartet | Wojciech Rajski | Tacet | |
| 2005 | Willie Rushton | London Philharmonic Orchestra | Siân Edwards | Classics for Pleasure | |
| 2006 | Colm Feore | Windsor Symphony Orchestra | John Morris Russell | | |
| 2007 | Michael York | Fort Worth Symphony Orchestra | Miguel Harth-Bedoya | | |
| 2008 | Jacqueline du Pré | English Chamber Orchestra | Daniel Barenboim | Deutsche Grammophon | |
| 2011 | Phillip Schofield | Orchestre national du Capitole de Toulouse | Michel Plasson | EMI | |
| 2012 | Bramwell Tovey | Vancouver Symphony Orchestra | Bramwell Tovey | | Video on YouTube |
| 2015 | Alice Cooper | Bundesjugendorchester | Alexander Shelley | Deutsche Grammophon | |
| 2015 | Harry Shearer | Louisiana Philharmonic Orchestra | Carlos Miguel Prieto | | |
| 2015 | David Tennant | The Amazing Keystone Band | | Le Chant du Monde | |
| 2017 | Miriam Margolyes | Adelaide Symphony Orchestra | Nicholas Carter | ABC Classics | With Britten's The Young Person's Guide to the Orchestra and Borodin's "Polovtsian Dances" |
| 2017 | Alexander Armstrong | Liverpool Philharmonic Orchestra | Vasily Petrenko | Warner Classics | |
| 2018 | Giacomo Gates | New England Jazz Ensemble | Jeff Holmes | Self-released | Complete Peter and the Wolf score arranged for jazz ensemble by Walter Gwardyak with modern libretto by Giacomo Gates; Video on YouTube |
| 2021 | Viola Davis | Los Angeles Philharmonic | Gustavo Dudamel | | Video on YouTube |

== Adaptations ==
=== Walt Disney, 1946 ===
Disney's 1946 animated short

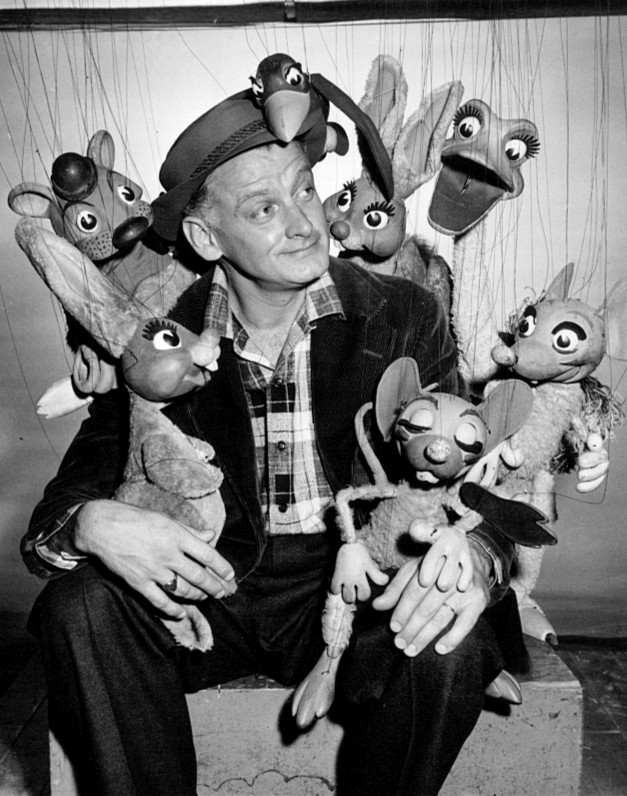
Art Carney poses with puppets made by Bil Baird for a 1958 TV version

Prokofiev, while touring the West in 1938, visited Los Angeles and met Walt Disney. Prokofiev performed the piano version for "le papa de Mickey Mouse" (French for "Mickey Mouse's dad"), as Prokofiev described him in a letter to his sons. Disney was impressed, and considered adding an animated version of Peter and the Wolf to Fantasia, which was to be released in 1940. Due to World War II, these plans fell through, and it was not until 1946 that Disney released his adaptation, narrated by Sterling Holloway. It is not known whether Prokofiev, who was by that point behind the Iron Curtain, was aware of this. It was released theatrically as a segment of Make Mine Music, then reissued the next year, accompanying a reissue of Fantasia (as a short subject), then separately on home video in the 1990s. This version made several changes to the original, including:

- During the character introduction, the pets are given names: Sascha the songbird, Sonia the duck, and Ivan the cat.
- As the production begins, Peter and his friends already know that a wolf is nearby and are preparing to catch him.
- The hunters get names later in the story: Misha, Yasha, and Vladimir.
- Peter daydreams of hunting and catching the wolf, and for that purpose exits the garden carrying a wooden pop gun.
- At the end, in a reversal of the original (and to make the story more child-friendly), the narrator reveals that Sonia had not been eaten by the wolf. Earlier in the film, the wolf is shown chasing Sonia, who hides in a tree's hollow trunk. The wolf attacks out of view and returns in view with feathers in his mouth, licking his jaws. Peter, Ivan, and Sascha assume Sonia has been eaten. After the wolf is caught, Sascha is shown mourning Sonia. She comes out of the tree trunk at that point, and they are happily reunited.

In 1957, for one of his television programs, Disney recalled how Prokofiev had visited, inspiring Disney's animated version. Disney used pianist Ingolf Dahl, who resembled Prokofiev, to re-create how the composer had played the themes from the score.

=== British–Polish co-production, 2006 ===
In 2006, Suzie Templeton and Hugh Welchman directed and produced, respectively, a stop-motion animated adaptation. It has no dialogue or narration: the story was told only via images and music, interrupted by sustained periods of silence. The soundtrack was performed by the Philharmonia Orchestra. The film premiered with a live accompaniment in the Royal Albert Hall. The film won the Annecy Cristal and the Audience Award at the 2007 Annecy International Animated Film Festival, and the 2007 Academy Award for Best Animated Short Film. This version makes some changes to the original Prokofiev story, including:

- Peter bumps into one of the "hunters" (teenage bullies in this telling), who throws him in a rubbish bin and aims at him with his rifle to scare him; the second hunter watches without interfering (thus, a dislike towards the hunter/bullies is immediately created).
- Because of a broken wing, the bird has trouble flying and takes Peter's balloon to help it get aloft.
- Peter captures the wolf in a net and then the hunter gets him in his rifle's sight coincidentally, but just before shooting, the second hunter stumbles, falls on him and makes him miss the shot.
- The caged wolf is brought into the village on a cart, where Peter's grandfather tries to sell it. The hunter comes to the container and sticks his rifle in to intimidate the animal (as he did with Peter earlier on). At that time Peter throws the net on the hunter, entangling the hunter.
- Before the grandfather has made a deal, Peter unlocks the cart after looking into the eyes of the wolf. They walk side by side through the awestruck crowd and then the freed wolf runs away in the direction of the silver moon shining over the forest.

== In copyright law ==
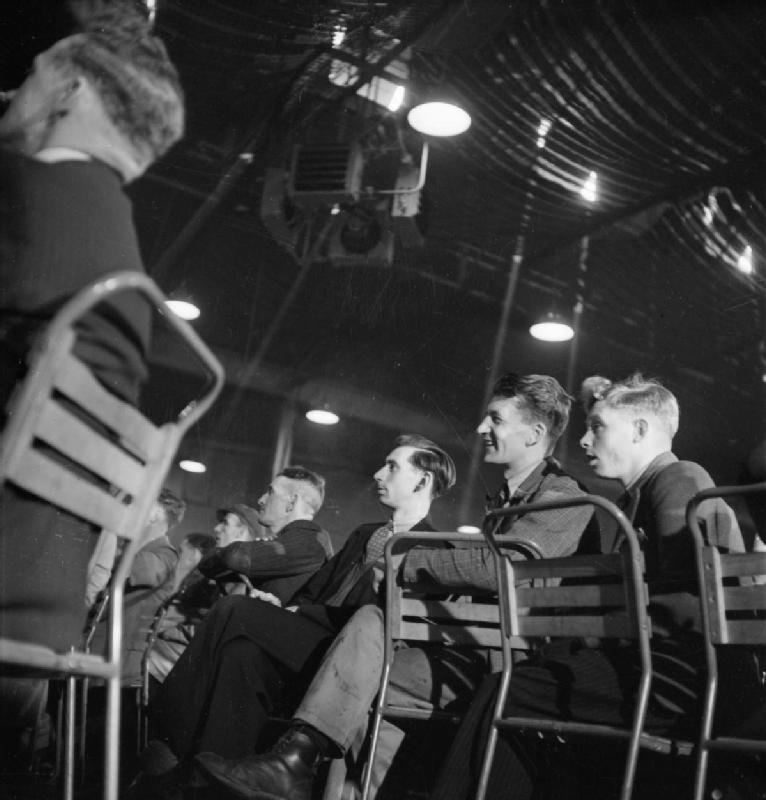
Factory workers in England watch a performance of Peter and the Wolf organised by the Council for the Encouragement of Music and the Arts, 1943

In the United States, the US Supreme Court's decision in 2012 in Golan v. Holder restored copyright protection in the United States to numerous foreign works that had entered the public domain. Peter and the Wolf was frequently cited by the parties and amici, as well as by the Court's opinion and by the press, as an example of a well-known work that would be removed from the public domain by the decision. The restored copyright per current law is 95 years after publication. Therefore the piece is expected to enter the public domain on 31 December 2031.

In many other countries, the piece is already in the public domain.
