= Kira Shashkina =

Russian pianist and pedagogue

Kira Alexandrovna Shashkina (Russian: Кира Александровна Шашкина, Kira Aleksandrovna Shashkina) is a Russian pianist and pedagogue. Many of her pupils became significant pianists and competition prizewinners, including Tchaikovsky Competition medalists Mikhail Pletnev and Alexander Lubyantsev.

== Biography ==
Kira Shashkina graduated from the Kazan Conservatory, having studied under A. Leman and V. Apresov, and received further training in the master-classes of Moscow Conservatory professors Heinrich Neuhaus and Jacob Milstein. She performed in solo recitals and with orchestra in concerts broadcast on radio and television.

In 1955 she began teaching at the Kazan Conservatory and its associated schools. From 1992 through 2017 she taught at the Central Music School of the Moscow Conservatory. Pianists who have studied with her have taken prizes at competitions at least 80 times, of which at least 51 were first prizes.

== Students ==
During his childhood, pianist, composer, and conductor Mikhail Pletnev, who was the winner of the 1978 Tchaikovsky Competition and who is the founder and chief conductor of the Russian National Orchestra, studied under Shashkina for six years at the Special Music School of the Kazan Conservatory. Other notable former pupils include Alexander Lubyantsev, Dong-Hyek Lim, Aleksei Chernov, and Philipp Kopachevskiy.
