= Critics' Prize (Tchaikovsky Competition) =

Music award

The Critics' Prize (sometimes called Critics' Special Prize) of the Moscow Music Critics Association is awarded to a participant of the International Tchaikovsky Competition. It is a parallel award and is not an official part of the competition. It was first awarded in 2011 to Alexander Lubyantsev. Subsequently, it was awarded to Lucas Debargue in 2015 and to Aylen Pritchin in 2019. In 2011 the award was supported by the Mikhail Prokohorov Foundation and in 2019 by the record label Melodiya.

== History ==
=== 2011 ===
At the XIV International Tchaikovsky Competition, an uproar followed the second-round results of the piano competition. Chronicles of the events appeared in the British newspapers The Guardian and The Times. The Times wrote that audience members and Russian critics were upset at the elimination of Eduard Kunz and Alexander Lubyantsev. The Guardian, concluding that the Tchaikovsky Competition audience is "one of the most interactive, involved and opinionated groups of music lovers anywhere," called Lubyantsev, who was a top prizewinner at the competition's previous edition, a "favorite of the fervent, Muscovite public" and described his being "mobbed like a pop star by groups of photographers, journalists and teenage girls" backstage after his last performance. According to the newspaper, it was his departure that "caused the most controversy." Remarkable accounts of the public's unequivocal behavior towards Lubyantsev and towards some jury members appeared in international and Russian newspapers.

The Times wrote that Valery Gergiev, chairman of the organizing committee, was "forced" to call a press conference "to answer the press outcry about the piano jury's decisions." The critics petitioned Gergiev to include a "Critics' Prize" among the competition's awards, citing the presence of such prizes at other major competitions, including the Queen Elizabeth Competition in Brussels. Speaking later in an interview on Radio Svoboda, critic Yuliya Bederova noted that in his refusal Gergiev did not cite the competition's regulations, which forbade the introduction of new awards later than two months before the start, but rather based his refusal on the fear that "any other opinions, should they be different, would call the jury's position into question." She continued, "For her colleagues and her, additional viewpoints are an enrichment and not a refutation of the jury's opinion or its authoritativeness," and noted that at the time of the press conference it was unknown whether the results of critics' vote and the jury's vote would be different.

The critics proceeded independently with their award, and Mikhail Prokhorov's Cultural Initiatives Foundation offered sponsorship in order to make a monetary prize possible. Irina Prokhorova commented that the critics' feelings and actions were "civic consciousness in a genuine and not vulgar form."

Following the voting of twenty-four professional music critics, Lubyantsev emerged as the winner with 58.33% of the votes. Among the other top-scoring candidates were Eduard Kunz (the runner-up), Daniil Trifonov, and Aleksei Chernov. Bederova stated that the prize was awarded to Lubyantsev in recognition of his "clear artistic individuality and a fresh approach to the art of performing."

In a radio interview after the competition, jury member Mikhail Voskresensky said that he, as well as several other jury members, had supported Lubyantsev, but that others had been against him. He commented, "I think that what was, in my opinion, an error of the jury could turn out to be more beneficial to him…As happened with Pogorelich." The day after Lubyantsev's exit, Valery Gergiev invited him to perform at the Mariinsky Theater.

=== 2015 ===
At the XV International Tchaikovsky Competition, Lucas Debargue, a Frenchman completely unknown beforehand and with a very different background and training from typical competitors, became the "audience's favorite" and the "most talked-about" participant. In The Huffington Post, critic Olivier Bellamy wrote, "There hasn't been a foreign pianist who has caused such a stir since Glenn Gould's arrival in Moscow, or Van Cliburn's victory at the Tchaikovsky Competition." Nonetheless, Debargue finished in fourth place. The Moscow Music Critics Association, however, awarded him their prize for "the pianist whose incredible gift, artistic vision and creative freedom have impressed the critics as well as the audience."

Regarding the results of the competition, jury member Boris Berezovsky said afterwards on Russian radio:

I'm not satisfied with the results of the competition. Our beloved Frenchman Lucas Debargue who deserved as a minimum a bronze, in my opinion even silver, was shifted to the fourth. Surprisingly, it was the decision of non-Russian jury members… We, Russian members of the jury, loved and supported him. However, the foreign members of the jury didn't accept him. They kept saying that he is unprofessional and pushed him down with all conceivable means, fair or unfair.

The Spectator remarked:

In [a] movie Debargue would come first rather than fourth (i.e. last). But that doesn't matter, because in the eyes of the public he was the real winner. The Moscow Music Critics Association thought so, too, awarding him their prize…

The Telegraph commented:

[Debargue] picked up the most junior prize but also won the critics' award, always a good sign of who the really interesting pianist is.

=== 2019 ===
At the XVI International Tchaikovsky Competition, the Moscow Music Critics Association awarded its prize to Russian violinist Aylen Pritchin, "for his artistic mastery and the beauty of his programs." The record label Melodiya will support the prize by recording and releasing a solo album of the winner.

== Winners ==
| Year | Winner |
|---|---|
| 2011 | (Russia) Alexander Lubyantsev |
| 2015 | (France) Lucas Debargue |
| 2019 | (Russia) Aylen Pritchin |
