= Lee (soundtrack) =

2025 film score

Lee (Original Motion Picture Soundtrack)

Film score by Alexandre Desplat
- Released: 7 February 2025
- Recorded: 2023–2024
- Studio: Abbey Road Studios, London
- Genre: Film score
- Length: 48:53
- Label: Lakeshore
- Producer: Alexandre Desplat; Dominique Solrey Lemonnier

Alexandre Desplat chronology
The Regime (2024)	Lee (2024)	The Most Precious of Cargoes (2024)

Lee (Original Motion Picture Soundtrack) is the film score composed by Alexandre Desplat for the 2024 biographical war drama film Lee directed by Ellen Kuras and starred Kate Winslet as WWII journalist Lee Miller. The score was released through Lakeshore Records on 7 February 2025, five months after the film's theatrical release.

== Background ==
In October 2021, it was announced that Alexandre Desplat would compose the film score for Lee. He considered working in the film "a wonderful experience" and the satisfying part in his career, owing to his working relationship with Winslet who was instrumental in the film's making and how her vision came to life. Desplat composed the orchestral score with minimalism and much of the sonic landscape is driven through minimal elements with certain scenes being driven by the sound design to bring an eerie sounding. Desplat conducted the 120-piece orchestra with his wife Dominique Lemonnier as the assistant conductor. Violinist Jonathan Evan-Jones, who played Wallace Hartley and contributed to the score composed by James Horner for Titanic (1997), also starring Winslet, was one of the orchestra musicians playing the score.

== Release ==
Wendy Ide of The Guardian wrote "The film's soundtrack, however, is less successful. The score, by Alexandre Desplat, is a bustling, busy orchestral mulch, so generic that it might as well have been pulled out of a drawer marked "prestige period pieces". When so much elsewhere in the picture makes such an effort to tap into the distinctive and highly unusual character of Lee Miller, the music choices feel throwaway and thoughtless in comparison." But, in another review for the Screen International, she called it an "earnest score". Carlos Aguilar of Variety wrote "Alexandre Desplat's score does its part in helping build an atmosphere both poignant and propulsive (particularly on the battlefield) to hold as much of who Lee was as possible."

James Southall of Movie Wave wrote "The moments of light that shine through in the score are all the lighter because of the more challenging material that surrounds them and I think it's a skilful and cerebral effort from one of the finest film composers around." Caryn James of BBC wrote "Alexandre Desplat's score matches that [dramatic] style, with a subtle, piercing beauty." Kate Stables of GamesRadar+ wrote "Alexandre Desplat's lush score hints at [Lee's] despair." Richard Roeper of Chicago Sun-Times wrote "the prolific and much-honored composer Alexandre Desplat provid[es] a suitably stirring score". Alex Maidy of JoBlo.com called it a "beautiful score".

== Track listing ==
No.	Title	Length
1.	"Lee"	1:38
2.	"Anything or Anyone"	1:07
3.	"Happy Days"	1:14
4.	"Vogue"	2:18
5.	"I Was Ambitious"	1:48
6.	"Am I In the Frame?"	1:34
7.	"Holly Shit"	2:45
8.	"Hospital"	3:22
9.	"Liberation"	2:25
10.	"Solange"	3:22
11.	"Drink This"	5:50
12.	"To the Front"	3:48
13.	"Arriving at Dachau"	3:47
14.	"H's Bathtub"	6:08
15.	"There Was Another Man"	6:22
16.	"La Garoupe"	1:25
Total length:		48:53

== Personnel ==
Credits adapted from Film Music Reporter

- Music composer and conductor: Alexandre Desplat
- Music supervisor: James A. Taylor
- Music producers: Alexandre Desplat, Dominique Solrey Lemonnier
- Assistant conductor: Dominique Solrey Lemonnier
- Orchestrations: Alexandre Desplat, Jean-Pascal Beintus
- Recording and mixing: Peter Cobbin, Kirsty Whalley
- Digital recordist: Daniel Hayden
- Assistant engineer: Marta Di Nozzi
- Senior runner: Sarah Meyz
- Programming: Romain Allender
- Music editor: Peter Clarke
- Music preparation: Norbert Vergonjanne, David Hage, Adri Mena
- Executive producer: Xavier Forcioli for Galileo Music
- Orchestral contractor: Susie Gillis for Isobel Griffiths Ltd.
- Orchestra leader: Thomas Bowes, Steve Morris
- Solo piano: David Arch
- Solo violin: Thomas Bowes
- Solo viola: Edward Vanderspar
- Solo cello: Tim Gill
- Solo double bass: Mary Scully
- Solo French horn: Nigel Black
- Solo trumpet: James Fountain
