= Peter and the Wolf (1946 film) =

- Directed by: Clyde Geronimi
- Story by: Eric Gurney; Dick Huemer
- Based on: Peter and the Wolf by Sergei Prokofiev
- Produced by: Walt Disney
- Starring: Jimmy MacDonald; Pinto Colvig
- Narrated by: Sterling Holloway
- Music by: Edward H. Plumb; Kurt Graunke (conductor)
- Animation by: Ollie Johnston; Ward Kimball; Eric Larson; John Lounsbery; George Rowley (effects)
- Layouts by: Charles Philippi; Hugh Hennessy
- Backgrounds by: Claude Coats
- Production company: Walt Disney Productions
- Distributed by: RKO Radio Pictures
- Release date: August 15, 1946 (USA)
- Running time: 15 minutes
- Country: United States

Peter and the Wolf is a 1946 animated short based on the 1936 musical composition/fairy tale by Sergei Prokofiev, produced by Walt Disney and narrated by Sterling Holloway. It was originally released theatrically as a segment in Make Mine Music. It was re-issued the following year accompanying a re-issue of Fantasia (as a short subject before the film), then released separately on home video in the 1990s.

== Background ==
Prokofiev, while touring the West in 1938, visited Los Angeles and met Walt Disney. Prokofiev performed the piano version of Peter and the Wolf for "le papa de Mickey Mouse", as Prokofiev described him in a letter to his sons. Disney was impressed, and considered adding an animated version of Peter and the Wolf to Fantasia, which was to be released in 1940. Due to the war, these plans fell through, and it was not until 1946 that Disney released his version of Peter and the Wolf. It is not known if Prokofiev, by that point behind the Iron Curtain, was aware of this.

== Plot ==
In Disney's animated adaptation of Prokofiev's masterpiece, in which every character is represented musically by a different instrument. The apparent setting is Russia. A young Peter decides to go hunting for the wolf that has been prowling around the village. Along the way, he is joined by his friends Sasha the songbird, Sonia the duck, and Ivan the cat. All the fun comes to end, however, when the hungry wolf makes an appearance.

== Differences from the original ==
This version makes several changes to the original story, for example:

- During the character introduction, the animals are given names: "Sasha" the songbird, "Sonia" the duck, and "Ivan" the cat.
- As the cartoon begins, Peter and his friends already know there is a wolf nearby and are preparing to catch him. Also, Peter's grandfather shows up almost immediately, whereas in most versions of the story he doesn't appear until just before the wolf shows up, plus here he isn't present in the parade following the wolf's capture.
- The hunters also get names at a later point in the story: "Misha" (the fat one), "Yasha" (the tall one), and "Vladimir" (the tiny one, whom Sterling Holloway identifies).
- Peter day-dreams of hunting and catching the wolf and exits the garden carrying a wooden "pop-gun" rifle with the purpose of hunting the wolf down.
- At the end, in a complete reversal of the original (and to make the story more child-friendly), it turns out that the duck, Sonia, has not been eaten by the wolf. (The wolf is shown chasing Sonia, who eventually dives into an old tree's hollow trunk. The wolf sticks his snout in after her and begins to thrash about as feathers stream out from other holes in the tree. He returns in view with some of Sonia's feathers in his mouth, licking his jaws in visible satisfaction. Peter, Ivan, and Sasha tearfully assume that Sonia has been eaten. After the wolf has been caught, Sasha is shown mourning Sonia at the base of the tree. She comes out of the tree trunk at that point and they are happily reunited as they both race to Peter's village).

== In other media ==
An audio recording of this version with expanded narration by Sterling Holloway was released on Disneyland Records (DQ-1242).

Peter and the Wolf is featured on DVD in the Walt Disney Gold Classic Collection release of Make Mine Music and in Walt Disney's It's a Small World of Fun! Vol. 2.
