= Wolf Tracks and Peter and the Wolf =

Album by Jean-Pascal Beintus

Studio album by Jean-Pascal Beintus

Wolf Tracks and Peter and the Wolf is a 2003 album that combined the orchestral composition Peter and the Wolf by Sergei Prokofiev with a 2002 composition, Wolf Tracks, which had its score written by French composer Jean-Pascal Beintus and text written by Walt Kraemer. The project was conceived and commissioned by the Russian National Orchestra, under the artistic direction of Kent Nagano.

Wolf Tracks, which has the alternate title The Wolf and Peter, is meant to be both a sequel to and a retelling of Peter and the Wolf. In the story, Peter's grandson, also named Peter, hears his grandfather describe his encounter with the wolf, and decides that he too should track and hunt down a wolf just as his grandfather did. His grandfather protests, saying that wolves should be left alone, because, "with their forests nearly gone, they've become hungry, desperate animals," but Peter ignores his grandfather's advice and goes off into the woods. There, Peter sees "a thin gray Wolf", out to find prey for his family, then chases it and captures it. Peter then hears the wolf's whimpering, and sees "the slate-blue beauty of his captive's eyes", and realizes that his grandfather was correct about the wolves being endangered; he realizes that "It wasn't really Peter's wolf at all. Wolves belong to the world... their world, our world of wonder, of nature’s splendor." He lets the wolf go free, and goes home to his grandfather. In the final scene, this Peter is now an old man, retelling the story of his adventure to his granddaughter.

Recordings were made in several languages. The main version, in English, had Peter and the Wolf narrated by Sophia Loren, and Wolf Tracks narrated by Bill Clinton. Three spoken-word sections, Introduction, Intermezzo and Epilogue, were recorded by Mikhail Gorbachev, who spoke in Russian, with a translation that followed in English. Each of three designated a charity to receive their royalties: Loren to the Magic of Music, an arts program for youth; Clinton to the International AIDS Trust; and Gorbachev to Green Cross International, an environmental charity.

A Spanish language version was released in 2005, with narration by Antonio Banderas and Sophia Loren. Versions were also released in Russian, narrated by actors Oleg Tabakov and Sergey Bezrukov and Mandarin Chinese, narrated by actor Pu Cunxin and television anchor Xiao Lu.

The art on the CD's cover and booklet was drawn by several orphans and disabled children from Moscow. The drawings were selected from the hundreds shown at the "How I See Music" Exhibition, an annual event sponsored by the RNO at the Moscow Conservatory.

== Awards ==
The recording received a Grammy in 2004, for Best Spoken Word Album for Children, the first one ever awarded to either a former U.S. President or a Russian orchestra.
