= Francesco Tristano Schlimé =

Francesco Tristano
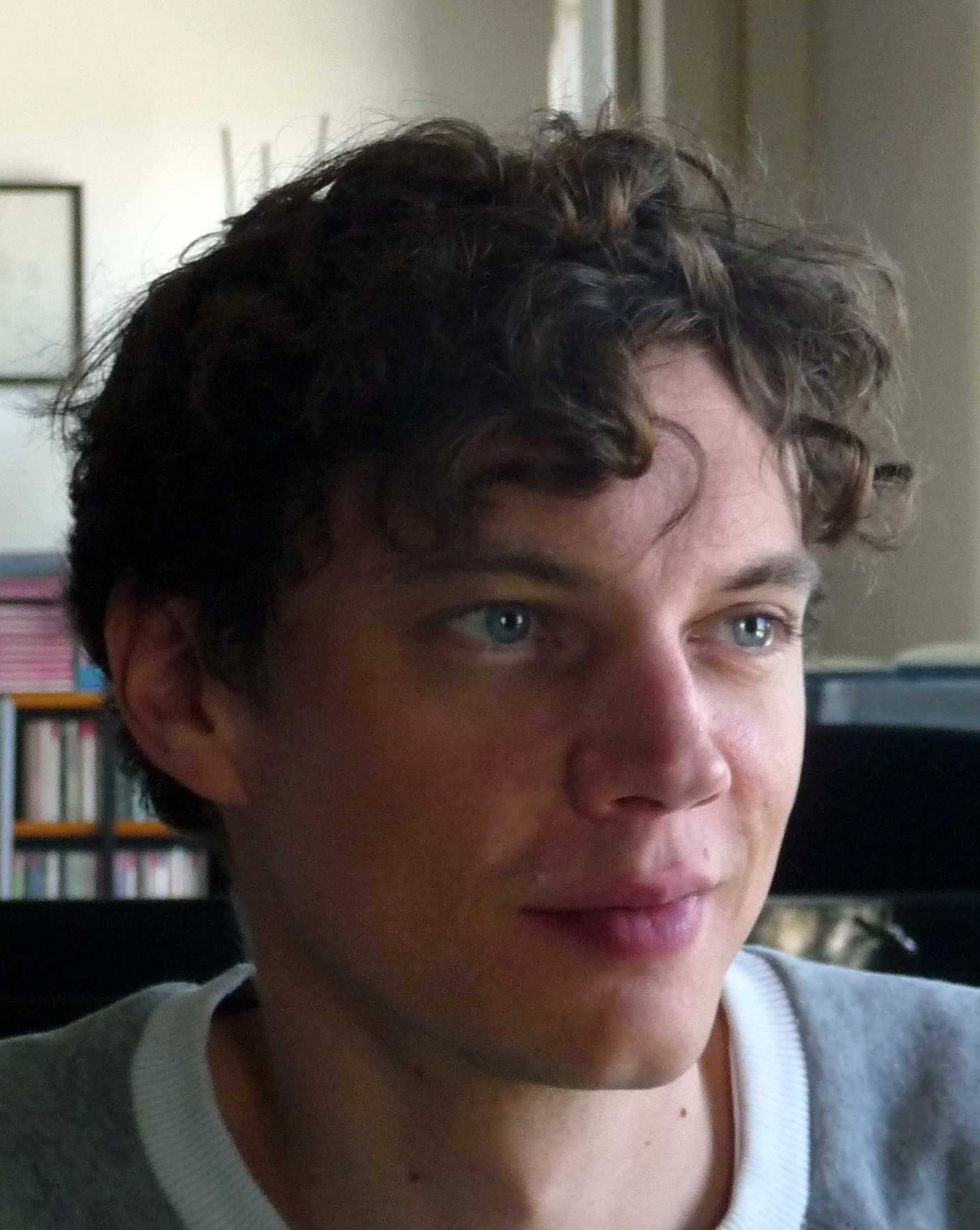
- Tristano in 2014

Background information
- Born: Francesco Tristano Schlimé; September 16, 1981 (age 45)
- Origin: Luxembourg
- Genres: classical music, electronic music
- Occupations: pianist, composer
- Instruments: piano, synth
- Years active: 2000–present
- Label: infiné
- Website: francescotristano.com

Francesco Tristano Schlimé, stage name Francesco Tristano, born 1981, is a Luxembourgish classical and experimental pianist and composer who also plays the clarinet. He composes both classical and electronic music.

== Education ==
Born on 16 September 1981 in Luxembourg City, Tristano studied at conservatories in Luxembourg, Brussels, Riga and Paris before graduating in music at New York's Juilliard School where his teachers were Jerome Lowenthal, Bruce Brubaker and Jacob Lateiner. He has also studied with Emile Naoumoff, Rosalyn Tureck and Mikhail Pletnev.

== Career ==
He debuted in 2000 with the Russian National Orchestra, with which he recorded Sergey Prokofiev's 5th Piano Concerto and Maurice Ravel's Piano Concerto years later. In 2004 he presented and conducted at the Grand Théâtre de Luxembourg and the Beaux-Arts in Brussels an original transcription/adaptation for piano and strings of Antonio Vivaldi's The Four Seasons. He was nominated by the Philharmonie Luxembourg for the 2008 European Concert Hall Organisation’s Carnegie Hall Rising Stars series.

He is a specialist in Baroque music and contemporary music. In 2001, Tristano founded The New Bach Players ensemble, with which he recorded Johann Sebastian Bach's complete cycle of Keyboard concertos for Accord. He has also recorded the Goldberg Variations and the French Suites, as well as Girolamo Frescobaldi's 1st book of Toccatas. Involved in contemporary music, he has recorded Luciano Berio's complete piano works and collaborated with electronic music artists such as Carl Craig and Murcof. He won the 2004 Concours International de piano XXe siècle d'Orléans.

He was a member, with Rami Khalife and Aymeric Westrich, of the Aufgang group, whose eponymous album was released in 2009. Francesco Tristano left Aufgang in February 2014. The trio also released the albums Air on Fire and Istiklaliya. Aufgang is continuing as a duo composed of Rami Khalifé and Aymeric Westrich.

== Discography ==
=== Albums ===
- 2001 : Goldberg Variations (Accord ACD127-2)
- 2006 : Ravel-Piano concerto in G/Prokofiev-Piano concerto no. 5/Schlimé-3 Improvisations (Label PENTATONE PTC 5186080)
- 2007 : Not For Piano (Label Infiné)
- 2008 : Auricle Bio /On (Label Infiné)
- 2010 : Idiosynkrasia (Label Infiné)
- 2011 : bachCage (Label Deutsche Grammophon)
- 2012 : Long Walk (Label Deutsche Grammophon)
- 2017 : Piano Circle Songs (Label Sony Classical)
- 2019 : “Tokyo Stories” (Label Sony Classical)
- 2021 : “Supercinema 04” (Label Sony Classical)
- 2022 : On Early Music (Label Sony Classical)
- 2024 : bach the 6 partitas (Label Naïve, catalogue # V8619DUP)
- 2025 : bach the 6 english suites (Label Naïve, catalogue # V8828)
- 2025 : bach the 7 toccatas (Label Naïve, catalogue # V8831)

=== Maxis ===
- 2006 : Strings of Life (2006 - Label Infiné)
- 2010 : The Melody (Label Infiné)
- 2011 : Idiosynkrasia Remixes (Label Infiné)
- 2011 : Idiosynkrasia (Only Vinyl Edition) (Label Infiné)

=== Other projects ===
- 2009 : Aufgang - Aufgang (Album, Label Infiné)
- 2009 : Aufgang - Sonar (Maxi, Label Infiné)
- 2009 : Aufgang - Channel 7 (Maxi, Label Infiné)
- 2010 : Aufgang - Air On Fire (Album, Label Infiné)
- 2010 : Aufgang - Barock (Maxi, Label Infiné)
- 2010 : Aufgang - Dulceria (Maxi, Label Infiné)
- 2013 : Aufgang - Istiklaliya (album, Label Infiné

=== Participations ===
- 2010 : Various Artists - Introducing Infiné (Label Infiné)
- 2011 : Various Artists - Remixing Infiné (Label Infiné)
