= Mikhail Pletnev =

Russian musician (born 1957)

Mikhail Pletnev Михаил Плетнёв People's Artist of the RSFSR
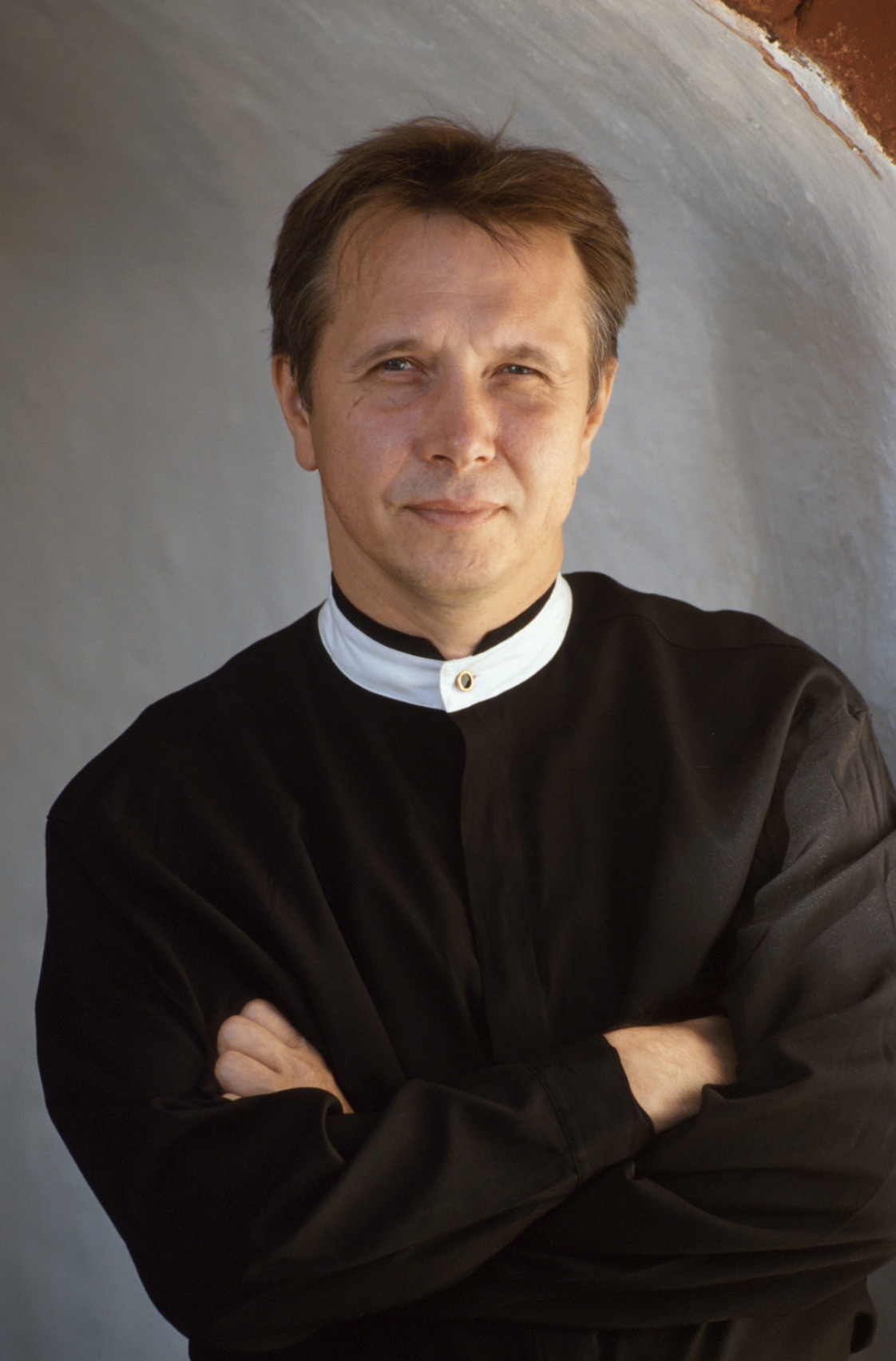
- Pletnev in 2007

Background information
- Born: 14 April 1957 (age 69); Arkhangelsk, Russian SFSR, Soviet Union
- Genre: Classical music
- Occupations: Pianist; conductor; composer
- Instrument: Piano
- Labels: Deutsche Grammophon, Pentatone, Virgin Classics
- Website: mikhailpletnev.com

Mikhail Vasilievich Pletnev (Russian: Михаил Васильевич Плетнёв, romanized: Mikhail Vasilyevich Pletnyov; born 14 April 1957) is a Russian pianist, conductor and composer.

== Life and career ==
Pletnev was born into a musical family in Arkhangelsk, then part of the Soviet Union. His father played and taught the bayan, and his mother was a pianist. He studied with Kira Shashkina for six years at the Special Music School of the Kazan Conservatory, before entering the Moscow Central Music School at the age of 13, where he studied under Evgeny Timakin. Also in the class was fellow pianist Ivo Pogorelić, with whom he formed a lasting friendship. In 1974 he entered the Moscow Conservatory, studying under Yakov Flier and Lev Vlassenko. At age 21, he won the Gold Medal at the VI International Tchaikovsky Competition in 1978, which earned him international recognition and drew great attention worldwide. The following year he made his debut in the United States. He also taught at the Moscow Conservatory. Pletnev has acknowledged Sergei Rachmaninoff as a particularly notable influence on him as a musician.

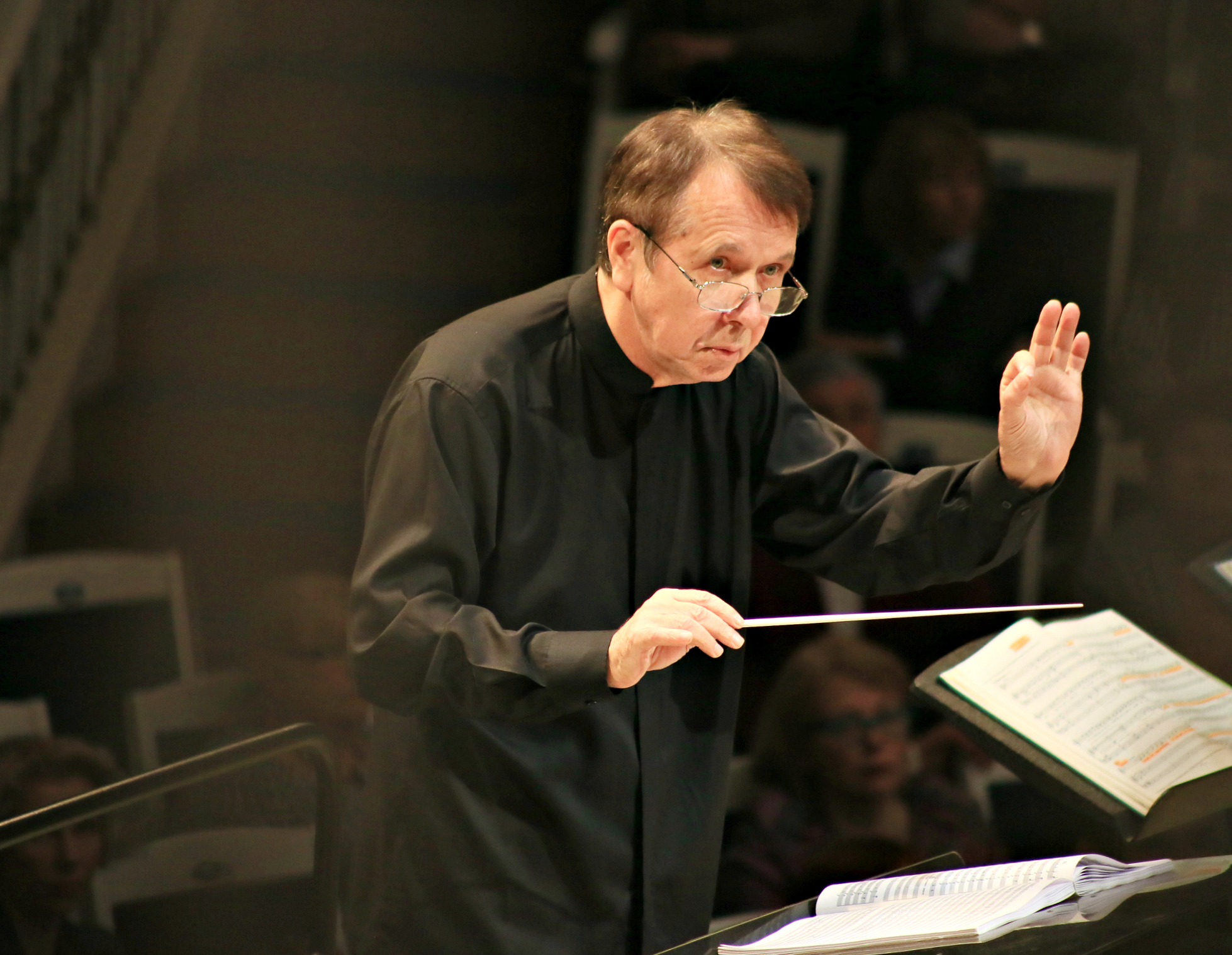
Pletnev conducting, 2017

In 1988 Pletnev was invited to perform at the superpower conference in Washington, D.C., where he met and befriended Mikhail Gorbachev. From this friendship, he gained the support to found two years later the Russian National Orchestra in 1990, the first non-government-supported orchestra in Russia since 1917, and became its first principal conductor. He and the orchestra made their recording debut on Virgin Classics, releasing Tchaikovsky's Sixth Symphony and Marche Slave in 1991. He stepped down as Principal Conductor in the late 1990s, but remained the orchestra's artistic director.

Pletnev has made a number of recordings with Deutsche Grammophon. His recordings are mostly of Russian works, though in 2007 he recorded the complete Beethoven symphonies. The first works he recorded were for orchestra, including Tchaikovsky's The Sleeping Beauty, his Sixth Symphony and Manfred Symphony, and Rachmaninoff's Second and Third Symphonies. Pletnev's recording of Tchaikovsky's First Symphony (Winter Daydreams) received critical acclaim.

In July 2010 Pletnev was arrested on suspicion of child molestation in Thailand, where he owns a home. He denied the allegations and was released on bail. The charges were dropped on 28 September.

On November 11, 2026, Pletnev collapsed mid-performance while conducting Tchaikovsky's Fourth Symphony with the Tokyo Philharmonic Orchestra.

== Awards and recognitions ==
- 1978: Gold Medal and First Prize Tchaikovsky Competition Moscow
- 1999: Echo Klassik (Skrjabin)
- 2002: State Prize First Class of the Russian Federation by President Vladimir Putin
- 2005: Grammy Awards of 2005 Best Chamber Music Performance with Martha Argerich
- 2006: State Prize First Class of the Russian Federation for the year 2005 by President Vladimir Putin

== Notable compositions ==
- 1978: Quintet for Piano, Flute, Violin, Viola and cello
- 1979: "Triptych" for Symphony Orchestra
- 1985: Capriccio for Piano and Orchestra
- 1988: Classical Symphony
- 1997: Viola Concerto
- 2000: Variations on a theme by Rachmaninov
- 2000: Adagio for five Double basses
- 2006: Cello sonata
- 2006: Fantasia Elvetica (First performance: December 9, 2006 Orchester Musikkollegium Winterthur Switzerland; Mikhail Pletnev, Conductor; Sascha und Mischa Manz)
- 2009: Jazz suite

== Transcriptions ==
- 1976: Rodion Konstantinovich Shchedrin: 2 Concert Pieces from „Anna Karenina“ (Transcription for piano)
- 1978 (?): Pyotr Ilyich Tchaikovsky: The Nutcracker, The Sleeping Beauty (Transcriptions for piano)
- 2003: Sergei Sergeyevich Prokofiev: Suite from Cinderella op. 87 (Transcription for two pianos)

== Honours and awards ==
- Lenin Komsomol Prize (1978) – for high performance skills
- Glinka State Prize of the RSFSR (1982) – for concert programs (1978–1981)
- Russian Federation State Prize in Literature and Art:
  - 7 December 1993 – for concert programs of the Russian National Symphony Orchestra in recent years
  - 27 May 1996 – for the creation and execution of the Jubilee Music Festival "Alfred Schnittke Festival" (1994, Moscow), Third and Fourth Symphonies, the Concerto for Viola and Orchestra, Concert number 2 for Cello and Orchestra, Concerto Grosso № 5, three spiritual choruses ("Hail Mary Hail," "Jesus Christ" "Our Father"), the cantata "The History of Dr. Johann Faust,"
  - 9 June 2006 – for outstanding technical skill and innovation in the field of musical art, which opened a new chapter in national and world culture
- Order of Merit for the Fatherland;
- Prize of the President of the Russian Federation in the field of art and literature in 2001 (30 January 2002)
- 47th Grammy Awards (2005) – best chamber music performance

== Selected discography ==
- Shostakovich Symphonies 4 & 10. Russian National Orchestra. PENTATONE PTC 5186647 (2018).
- Tchaikovsky Selections. Peter Ilyich Tchaikovsky. Coronation March / Capriccio Italien / Francesca da Rimini / Romeo and Juliet / Slavonic March. Mikhail Pletnev, Russian National Orchestra. PENTATONE PTC 5186550 (2016).
- Alexander Scriabin - Symphony No. 1 & The Poem of Ecstasy. Mikhail Pletnev, Svetlana Shilova, Mikhail Gubsky, Vladislav Lavrik, Norbert Gembaczka, Alexander Solovyev, Russian National Orchestra, Chamber Choir of the Moscow Conservatory. PENTATONE PTC 5186514 (2015).
- Peter Ilyich Tchaikovsky The Symphonies and Manfred. Mikhail Pletnev, Russian National Orchestra. PENTATONE PTC 5186489 (2015).
- Peter Ilyich Tchaikovsky. Manfred Symphony. Mikhail Pletnev, Russian National Orchestra. PENTATONE PTC 5186387 (2014).
- Dmitri Shostakovich - Symphony No.15 & Hamlet. Mikhail Pletnev, Russian National Orchestra. PENTATONE PTC 5186331 (2009).
- Nikolai Rimsky-Korsakov Orchestral Suites. Mikhail Pletnev, Russian National Orchestra. PENTATONE PTC 5186362 (2010).
- Maurice Ravel & Serge Prokofiev - Piano Concertos & Schlimé - 3 Improvisations. Mikhail Pletnev, Francesco Tristano Schlimé, Russian National Orchestra. PENTATONE PTC 5186080 (2006)
- Dmitri Shostakovich - Symphony No. 11 "The Year 1905" Mikhail Pletnev, Russian National Orchestra. PENTATONE PTC 5186076 (2006).
- Peter Ilyich Tchaikovsky Symphony No. 1 in G Minor, Op. 13 "Winter Daydreams" Marche Slave Op. 31. Mikhail Pletnev, Russian National Orchestra. PENTATONE PTC 5186381 (2012).
- Peter Ilyich Tchaikovsky Symphony No. 2 in C Minor Op. 17 "Little Russian" Symphony No. 2 in C Minor. Mikhail Pletnev, Russian National Orchestra. PENTATONE PTC 5186382 (2012).
- Peter Ilyich Tchaikovsky Symphony No.3 in D Major, Op.29 Coronation March. PENTATONE PTC 5186383 (2012).
- Peter Ilyich Tchaikovsky Symphony No. 4 in F minor Op. 36 Romeo and Juliet. Mikhail Pletnev, Russian National Orchestra. PENTATONE PTC 5186384 (2011).
- Peter Ilyich Tchaikovsky Symphony No.5 in E minor, Op.64 Francesca da Rimini, Op.32. Mikhail Pletnev, Russian National Orchestra. PENTATONE PTC 5186385 (2011).
- Peter Ilyich Tchaikovsky Symphony No.6 in B minor, Op.74 "Pathétique" Capriccio italien, Op.45. Mikhail Pletnev, Russian National Orchestra. PENTATONE PTC 5186386 (2011).
- Sergei Taneyev - At the reading of a psalm. Mikhail Pletnev, Lolita Semenina, Marianna Tarassova, Mikhail Gubsky, Andrei Baturkin, Vladislav Tchernushenko, Russian National Orchestra. PENTATONE PTC 5186038 (2004).
- Johann Sebastian Bach, Domenico Scarlatti, Ludwig van Beethoven, Frédéric Chopin. Recital of Mikhail Pletnev (2019)
