= Russian National Orchestra =

Orchestra

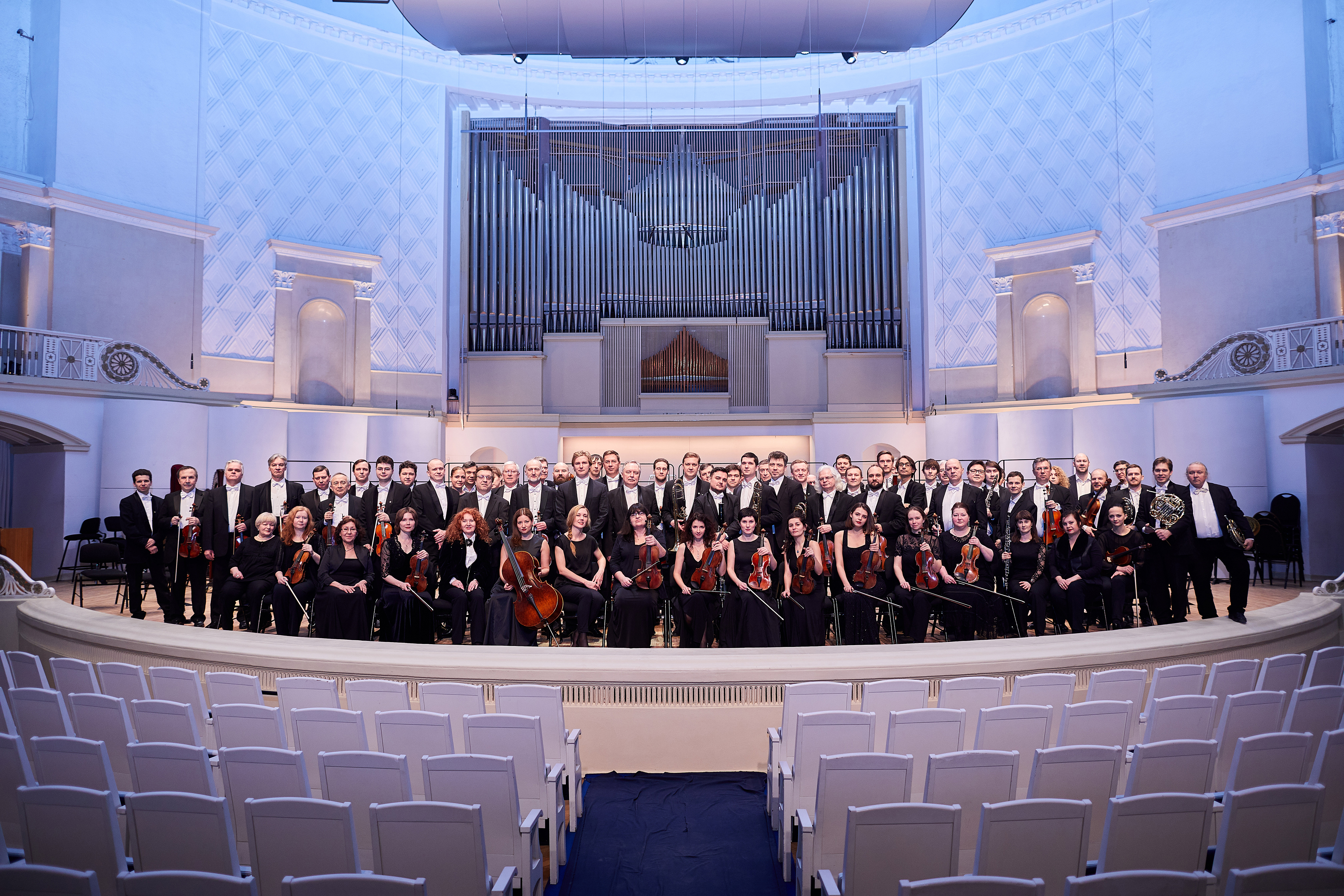
Russian National Orchestra

The Russian National Orchestra (Russian: Российский национальный оркестр) was founded in Moscow in 1990 by pianist and conductor Mikhail Pletnev. It was the first Russian orchestra to perform at the Apostolic Palace, Vatican City and in Israel.

== History ==
The RNO's first recording (1991) was Tchaikovsky's Symphony No. 6, Pathétique, released on Virgin Classics. Since then, the orchestra has made over 80 recordings for Deutsche Grammophon, Pentatone, Ondine, Warner Classics and other labels, and with conductors that include RNO Founder and Artistic Director Mikhail Pletnev, Vladimir Jurowski, Paavo Järvi, Kent Nagano, Carlo Ponti, José Serebrier and Vasily Petrenko. Notable releases include the complete Beethoven symphonies and piano concertos on Deutsche Grammophon, Tchaikovsky's six symphonies for Pentatone, and the RNO Shostakovich project, also on Pentatone.

The RNO's recording of Prokofiev's Peter and the Wolf and Beintus's Wolf Tracks, conducted by Kent Nagano and narrated by Sophia Loren, Bill Clinton and Mikhail Gorbachev, was the winner of a 2004 Grammy Award, making the RNO the first Russian orchestra ever to win this honor. A Spanish-language version narrated by Antonio Banderas was released in 2007, following a Russian version narrated by actors Oleg Tabakov and Sergei Bezrukov, with a Mandarin edition following in 2011. Narrators in concert versions of these works have included actors Danny Glover, Diana Douglas, Sean Dill and Debbie Allen, model Tatiana Sorokko, Singaporean violinist Min Lee, and BBC anchor Seva Novgorodsev.

Touring annually, the RNO appears in the music capitals of Europe, Asia and the Americas, and is a frequent guest at festivals such as Edinburgh, the BBC Proms, Festival Napa Valley, and Festival of the Arts BOCA. In 2009 the RNO launched its own annual festival, the RNO Grand Festival, held each year in September to open the Moscow classical music concert season. The tenth anniversary festival was held from September 10 to October 4, 2018.

RNO concerts are often aired on National Public Radio, the European Broadcasting Union, and Russia's Kultura channel.

In 2008, a panel of international critics assembled by Gramophone named the Russian National Orchestra as one of the world's top orchestras.

The RNO maintains two outreach programs in the US and Russia: Cultural Allies, encompassing exchanges between artists in Russia and the West and the commissioning of new works; and the Magic of Music, bringing RNO musicians to play for children in Moscow's orphanages, special facilities for the mentally and physically disabled, and bringing school children to concert halls in Moscow for RNO children's concerts. In the two decades since the Magic of Music program was created, it has expanded to the US with Russian National Orchestra musicians performing for school children while on tour.

The Russian National Orchestra is a private institution supported by individuals, corporations and foundations in Russia and throughout the world. Organizations that support the RNO include the Russian Arts Foundation, Prince Michael of Kent Foundation, Ann and Gordon Getty Foundation, Mikhail Prokhorov Foundation, and the Trust for Mutual Understanding.

== Awards ==
Recording	Award
Beethoven: Piano Concertos No. 2 and No. 4	Best Concerto Recording 2007, Tokyo Record Academy
Beethoven: The Nine Symphonies	WGUC Top CD of 2007; Recording of the Month, MusicWeb
Glazunov: Complete Concertos	Classical CD of the Week, The Telegraph; Recording of the Month, MusicWeb; CD of the Week (Colorado and Minnesota Public Radio); CD of the Week (WQZR New York, WETA Washington)
Prokofiev: Cinderella	Top Recordings of the 1990s, Gramophone Magazine
Prokofiev & Beintus: Peter and the Wolf / Wolf Tracks	GRAMMY Award, 2004
Rachmaninov: Symphony No. 3, Symphonic Dances	Romantic Record of the Year (Classic FM Magazine), 1998
Scriabin: Symphony No 3, The Poem of Ecstasy	Classical CD of the Week: The Telegraph, London
Shostakovich: Symphonies No. 1 and No. 6	Editor's Choice, Gramophone Magazine; Diapason d'Or de l'année; Choc du monde de la Musique de l'année; Double 10, Classics Today; Best of 2006, Soundstage
Shostakovich: Symphony No. 11, "The Year 1905"	Classical CD of the Week, The Telegraph, London; Best of 2006, Soundstage
Shostakovich: Symphony No. 15 & Hamlet	BBC Music Choice of the Month
Shostakovich: Symphony No. 8	Supersonic Award, Pizzicato, (Luxembourg)
Shostakovich: Symphonies No. 5 and No. 9	Choc du monde de la Musique (May 2007); Edison Award Nominee, 2008 (Netherlands)
Taneyev: At the Reading of a Psalm	Classical CD of the Week: The Telegraph, London
Tchaikovsky: Symphony No. 6 (Virgin Classics)	Gramophone List: The 100 Greatest Recordings
Tchaikovsky: Violin Concerto in D (Julia Fischer)	BBC Music Magazine, Best Recording of Tchaikovsky Violin Concerto 2007 Gramophone Artist of the Year Echo Klassik Award, Best Instrumental Performance of 2007 Best Recording of Tchaikovsky's Violin Concerto (ClassicalMusic.com) Best of 2006, Audiophile Audition Editor's Choice, Gramophone Magazine (April 2007) Financial Times Critics Choice
Tchaikovsky: Suite No. 3; Stravinsky: Divertimento	Classical CD of the Week: The Telegraph, London
Tchaikovsky: Hamlet & Romeo and Juliet	Recording of the Month, Gramophone Magazine (March 2009)
Tchaikovsky: Symphony No. 5 & Francesca da Rimini (Pentatone)	Disc of the Month, BBC Music Magazine (October 2011)
Russian Violin Concertos (Julia Fischer)	Editor's Choice, Gramophone Magazine (January 2005); 2005 Echo Klassik Award, Concerto Record of the Year
Ravel & Prokofiev: Piano Concertos (Francesco Tristano Schlimé)	Choc du monde de la Musique (July/Aug 2006); Editor's Choice, Gramophone Magazine (September 2006); Classical CD of the Week, The Daily Telegraph
Chopin & Loewe: Piano Concertos (Mari Kodama)	Best of 2004, Audiophile Audition
Prokofiev, Rachmaninov: Piano Concertos No. 3 (Mikhail Pletnev)	Nominated for GRAMMY Award, 2004

== Recordings ==
Since 1990, the RNO has released over 80 recordings on CD and SACD. These include:

Description	Conductor	Label/Number
2018
Dmitri Shostakovich Symphony No. 4 in C minor Symphony No. 10 in E minor	Mikhail Pletnev	Pentatone 5186647
2017
Johann Sebastian Bach Ich ruf zu Dir, Herr Jesu Christ Ich habe genug Orchestral Suite No. 2 in B minor	Metropolitan Hilarion Alfeyev, Stephan Genz	Pentatone 5186593
2016
Divine Art Vyacheslav Artyomov Symphony: Gentle Emanation Tristia II	Teodor Currentzis, Vladimir Ponkin	Divine Art Records DDA 25143
Tchaikovsky Selections Peter Ilyich Tchaikovsky Coronation March Capriccio italien Francesca da Rimini: Fantasy for Orchestra after Dante Romeo and Juliet Overture-Fantasia Marche slave	Mikhail Pletnev	Pentatone 5186550
2015
Peter Ilyich Tchaikovsky: The Symphonies and “Manfred” Symphony	Mikhail Pletnev	Pentatone 5186489
Alexander Scriabin Symphony No. 1 in E major The Poem of Ecstasy (Symphony No. 4) Svetlana Shilova, soprano Mikhail Gubsky, tenor Vladislav Lavrik, trumpet Norbert Gembaczka, organ Chamber Choir of the Moscow Conservatory	Mikhail Pletnev	Pentatone 5186514
Metropolitan Hilarion Alfeyev Stabat Mater Concerto Grosso Fugue on the B-A-C-H Motif Canciones de la muerte De profundis Soloists: Svetlana Kasyan, Artyom Dervoed, Tatiana Porshneva, Maxim Khokholkov, Sergei Dubov, Alexander Gotgelf, Moscow Synodal Choir		Pentatone 5186486
Dmitri Shostakovich Symphony No. 7 in C major	Paavo Järvi	Pentatone 5176511
2014
Peter Ilyich Tchaikovsky “Manfred” Symphony	Mikhail Pletnev	Pentatone 5186387
2012
Peter Ilyich Tchaikovsky Symphony No. 3 in D major Coronation March	Mikhail Pletnev	Pentatone 5186383
Sergei Prokofiev Violin Concerto No. 1 in D major Violin Concerto No. 2 in G minor Sonata for Solo Violin in D major Arabella Steinbacher, violin	Vasily Petrenko	Pentatone 5186395
Peter Ilyich Tchaikovsky Symphony No. 2 in C Minor – Little Russian Symphony No. 2 in C Minor (Original First Movement)	Mikhail Pletnev	Pentatone 5186382
Peter Ilyich Tchaikovsky Symphony No. 1 in G minor – Winter Daydreams Marche slave	Mikhail Pletnev	Pentatone 5186381
2011
Peter Ilyich Tchaikovsky Symphony No. 6 in B minor – Pathétique Capriccio italien	Mikhail Pletnev	Pentatone 5186386
Peter Ilyich Tchaikovsky The Nutcracker – Ballet in Two Acts Vesna Children's Choir	Mikhail Pletnev	Ondine ODE 1180-2D
Nikolai Rimsky-Korsakov Schéhérazade Capriccio espagnol Neapolitan Song Tatiana Porshneva and Alexei Bruni, violin	Carlo Ponti	Pentatone 5186 378
Peter Ilyich Tchaikovsky Symphony No. 5 in E minor Francesca da Rimini: Fantasy for Orchestra after Dante	Mikhail Pletnev	Pentatone 5186 385
Peter Ilyich Tchaikovsky Symphony No. 4 in F minor Romeo and Juliet Overture-Fantasia (Final version of 1880)	Mikhail Pletnev	Pentatone 5186384
Alexander Glazunov: Complete Concertos Violin Concerto in A minor Chant du ménestrel Piano Concerto No. 2 in B major Concerto in E-flat major for Alto Saxophone and String Orchestra Piano Concerto No. 1 in F minor Rêverie in D-flat major for Horn and Orchestra Concerto Ballata in C major for Cello and Orchestra Méditation in D major for Violin and Orchestra Soloists: Rachel Barton Pine, Alexander Romanovsky, Wen-Sinn Yang, Marc Chisson, Alexey Serov	José Serebrier	Warner Classics 2564-67946-5 (2CD)
Sergei Rachmaninov The Isle of the Dead, Symphonic Poem Symphony No. 1 in D minor Symphony No. 2 in E minor The Rock – Fantasy Symphony No. 3 in A minor Symphonic Dances The Bells Sergei Taneyev John of Damascus, Cantata for Chorus and Orchestra after a poem by A. Tolstoy	Mikhail Pletnev	Deutsche Grammophon 477 9505 6
2010
Sergei Rachmaninov Festive Overture Chant du ménestrel The Bells Entr’acte (Act IV) from Khovanshchina, orchestrated by Leopold Stokowski Vocalise, orchestrated byJosé Serebrier Lyubov Petrova, soprano Andrei Popov, tenor Sergei Leiferkus, baritone Moscow State Chamber Choir	José Serebrier	Warner Classics 2564-68025-5
Peter Ilyich Tchaikovsky Swan Lake – Ballet in Four Acts	Mikhail Pletnev	Ondine ODE 1167-2D
Peter and the Wolf / Wolf Tracks [in Mandarin] Sergei Prokofiev Peter and the Wolf Xiao Lu and Geng Chun, narrators in Mandarin Jean-Pascal Beintus Wolf Tracks Pu Cunxin, narrator in Mandarin Sergei Prokofiev Peter and the Wolf Jean-Pascal Beintus Wolf Tracks Sophia Loren, Bill Clinton, Mikhail Gorbachev, narrators in English	Kent Nagano	Pentatone 5186311
Gershwin and Bernstein George Gershwin Concerto in F Leonard Bernstein The Age of Anxiety Ingrid Jacoby, piano	Dmitry Liss	Ondine ODE 1163-2
Nikolai Rimsky-Korsakov Suite from The Snow Maiden Suite from Legend of the Invisible City of Kitezh and the Maiden Fevroniya Nuit sur le Mont Triglav – 3rd Act of the Ballet Opera Mlada	Mikhail Pletnev	Pentatone 5186 362
2009
Dmitri Shostakovich Symphony No. 15 in A major Hamlet – Selections from the Incidental Music	Mikhail Pletnev	Pentatone 5186 331
2008
Modest Mussorgsky Pictures at an Exhibition Night on the Bare Mountain The Sorochinsky Fair Khovanshchina – Prelude and Dance of the Persian Slave Girls	Carlo Ponti	Pentatone SACD 5186332
Peter Ilyich Tchaikovsky Hamlet – Overture and Incidental Music Romeo and Juliet Overture-Fantasia	Vladimir Jurowski	Pentatone 5186330
Ludwig van Beethoven Piano Concertos No. 1-5 Mikhail Pletnev, piano	Christian Gansch	Deutsche Grammophon 477 7475
Ludwig van Beethoven Piano Concerto No. 5 in E-flat major Mikhail Pletnev, piano	Christian Gansch	Deutsche Grammophon 477 6417
2007
Sergei Prokofiev Symphony No. 5 in B-flat major Ode to the End of the War	Vladimir Jurowski	Pentatone 5186083
Ludwig van Beethoven Symphonies No. 1-9 Angela Denoke, soprano Marianna Tarasova, mezzo-soprano Endrik Wottrich, tenor Matthias Goerne, baritone The Moscow State Chamber Choir conducted by Vladimir Minin	Mikhail Pletnev	Deutsche Grammophon 477 6409
Ludwig van Beethoven Piano Concerto No. 2 in B-flat major Piano Concerto No. 4 in G major Mikhail Pletnev, piano	Christian Gansch	Deutsche Grammophon 477 6416
Lee Johnson Dead Symphony	Lee Johnson	Jammates JAM-0635-CD
Ludwig van Beethoven Piano Concerto No. 1 in C major Piano Concerto No. 3 in D minor Mikhail Pletnev, piano	Christian Gansch	Deutsche Grammophon 477 6415
Dmitri Shostakovich Symphony No. 5 in D minor Symphony No. 9 in E-flat major	Yakov Kreizberg	Pentatone 5186 096
Peter and the Wolf / Wolf Tracks [in Spanish] Sergei Prokofiev Peter and the Wolf Jean-Pascal Beintus Wolf Tracks Sophia Loren, narrator (in English) Antonio Banderas, narrator (in Spanish)	Kent Nagano	Pentatone SACD
2006
Peter Ilyich Tchaikovsky Violin Concerto in D major Sérénade mélancolique Valse – Scherzo Souvenir d'un lieu cher Julia Fischer, violin	Yakov Kreizberg	Pentatone SACD
Dmitri Shostakovich Symphony No. 8 in C minor	Paavo Berglund	Pentatone SACD
Dmitri Shostakovich Symphony No. 1 in F minor Symphony No. 6 in B minor	Vladimir Jurowski	Pentatone SACD
Dmitri Shostakovich Symphony No. 11 – “The Year 1905”	Mikhail Pletnev	Pentatone SACD
Maurice Ravel Piano Concerto in G major Sergei Prokofiev Piano Concerto No. 5 in G major Francesco Tristano Schlimé 3 Improvisations Francesco Tristano Schlimé, piano	Mikhail Pletnev	Pentatone SACD
2005
Peter Ilyich Tchaikovsky Suite No. 3 in G major Igor Stravinsky Divertimento – Ballet Suite from Le baiser de la fée	Vladimir Jurowski	Pentatone SACD
Young America Choral Works by Gordon Getty Young America Three Welsh Songs Annabel Lee Victorian Scenes Jerusalem San Francisco Symphony Orchestra and Russian National Orchestra, Eric Ericson Chamber Choir, San Francisco Symphony Chorus	Michael Tilson Thomas, Alexander Vedernikov	Pentatone SACD
2004
Russian Violin Concertos Aram Khachaturian Violin Concerto in D minor Sergei Prokofiev Violin Concerto No. 1 in D Alexander Glazunov Violin Concerto in A minor Julia Fischer, violin	Yakov Kreizberg	Pentatone
Sergei Taneyev At the Reading of a Psalm Cantata No. 2 St. Petersburg State Academic Capella Choir and the Chernushenko Boys Choir of the Glinka Choral College	Mikhail Pletnev	Pentatone
Russian Ballet Suites Sergei Prokofiev Romeo and Juliet, Suite No. 1 Aram Khachaturian Suite from Spartacus Dmitri Shostakovich Suite from The Bolt	Alexander Vedernikov	Pentatone SACD
2003
Peter and the Wolf / Wolf Tracks [in English] Sergei Prokofiev Peter and the Wolf Jean-Pascal Beintus Wolf Tracks Sophia Loren, Bill Clinton, Mikhail Gorbachev, narrators	Kent Nagano	Pentatone SACD
Peter and the Wolf / Wolf Tracks [in Russian] Sergei Prokofiev Peter and the Wolf Oleg Tabakov, narrator Jean-Pascal Beintus Wolf Tracks Sergei Bezrukov, narrator Bonus track: Peter and the Wolf, Sophia Loren, narrator	Kent Nagano	Pentatone
Gordon Getty Joan and the Bells, Cantata for Soprano, Baritone, Chorus & Orchestra Lisa Delan, soprano Vladimir Chernov, baritone Eric Ericson Chamber Choir Sergei Prokofiev Romeo and Juliet, Suite No. 2	Alexander Vedernikov	Pentatone
Frédéric Chopin Piano Concerto No. 2 in F minor Carl Loewe Piano Concerto No. 2 in A Mari Kodama, piano	Kent Nagano	Pentatone
Peter Ilyich Tchaikovsky Violin Concerto in D major Christian Tetzlaff, violin Piano Concerto No. 1 in B-flat minor Nikolai Lugansky, piano	Kent Nagano	Pentatone
Sergei Prokofiev Piano Concerto No. 3 in C major Sergei Rachmaninov Piano Concerto No. 3 in D minor Mikhail Pletnev, piano	Mstislav Rostropovich	Deutsche Grammophon471476
2002
Dave Brubeck Returns to Moscow Dave Brubeck DVD/Video of Brubeck's 1997 trip to Moscow to perform with the RNO and Dave Brubeck Quartet. Includes his mass, To Hope! A Celebration and Blue Rondo à la Turk		
Peter Ilyich Tchaikovsky Symphony No. 6 in B minor – Pathétique Romeo and Juliet Overture-Fantasia	Mikhail Pletnev	Deutsche Grammophon 471 7422
Encore! The Russian National Orchestra Live in Concert Overture, The Marriage of Figaro Waltz of the Flowers (from The Nutcracker) Spanish Dance from Raimonda Hungarian Dance No. 1 in G minor Prelude to Act III of Lohengrin Dance from Ballet Suite No. 1 Waltz-Joke from Ballet Suite No. 1 In the Hall of the Mountain King, from Peer Gynt Suite, No. 1 Young Prince and the Young Princess, from Schéhérezade Slavonic Dance, No. 2 in E minor Lezghinka	Mikhail Pletnev	RNO 100
2001
Peter Ilyich Tchaikovsky Violin Concerto in D major Jules Conus Violin Concerto in E minor David Garrett, violin	Mikhail Pletnev	Deutsche Grammophon 4714282
2000
Sergei Rachmaninov The Bells Sergei Taneyev John of Damascus	Mikhail Pletnev	Deutsche Grammophon 471 029-2
Peter Ilyich Tchaikovsky Symphony No. 6 in B minor – Pathétique The Seasons Sleeping Beauty	Mikhail Pletnev	Virgin Classics
1999
Sergei Rachmaninov Symphony No. 1 in D minor The Isle of the Dead	Mikhail Pletnev	Deutsche Grammophon 463 075-2
1998
Rodion Shchedrin Carmen Suite Concertos for Orchestra No. 1 – Naughty Limericks Concertos for Orchestra No. 2 – The Chimes	Mikhail Pletnev	Deutsche Grammophon 471 136-2
Peter Ilyich Tchaikovsky A Tale of Dance and Music – The Nutcracker Moscow State Academy of Choreography	Mikhail Pletnev	RNO 2000 Video CD
Alexander Scriabin Le poème de l’extase Symphony No. 3 – Le divin poème	Mikhail Pletnev	Deutsche Grammophon 459 6812
1997
Peter Ilyich Tchaikovsky The Sleeping Beauty	Mikhail Pletnev	Deutsche Grammophon 457 6342
Ludwig van Beethoven Clarinet (Violin) Concerto in D major (arr. Mikhail Pletnev) Wolfgang Amadeus Mozart Clarinet Concerto in A major Michael Collins, clarinet	Mikhail Pletnev	Deutsche Grammophon 457 6522
1996
Carl Maria von Weber Invitation to the Dance Konzertstück for Piano and Orchestra in F minor Overture, Abu Hassan Overture, Der Freischütz Overture, Die drei Pintos Overture, Euryanthe Overture, Oberon Overture, The Ruler of the Spirits	Mikhail Pletnev	Deutsche Grammophon 453 4862
Alexander Glazunov Violin Concerto in A minor Dmitry Kabalevsky Violin Concerto in C major Peter Ilyich Tchaikovsky Souvenir d' un lieu cher Valse-Scherzo Gil Shaham, violin	Mikhail Pletnev	Deutsche Grammophon 457 0642
Sergei Rachmaninov Symphony No. 3 in A minor Symphonic Dances	Mikhail Pletnev	Deutsche Grammophon 457 5982
Peter Ilyich Tchaikovsky DISC 1 Romeo and Juliet Overture-Fantasia Francesca da Rimini: Symphonic Fantasy after Dante The Voyevoda The Tempest DISC 2 Marche slave Festival Overture on the Danish National Hymn Fatum Hamlet Overture-Fantasia Capriccio italien DISC 3 Hamlet Overture-Fantasia “Manfred” Symphony 1812 Overture	Mikhail Pletnev	Deutsche Grammophon
Peter Ilyich Tchaikovsky Festival Overture on the Danish National Anthem Marche slave Symphony No. 1 in G minor – Winter Daydreams	Mikhail Pletnev	Deutsche Grammophon 453 4452
Peter Ilyich Tchaikovsky 1812 Overture Symphonic Fantasy – Fate Symphony No. 2 in C minor – Little Russian	Mikhail Pletnev	Deutsche Grammophon 453 4462
Peter Ilyich Tchaikovsky Romeo and Juliet Overture-Fantasia Symphony No. 3 in D major – Polish	Mikhail Pletnev	Deutsche Grammophon 453 4472
Peter Ilyich Tchaikovsky Francesca da Rimini: Symphonic Fantasy after Dante Symphony No. 4 in F minor	Mikhail Pletnev	Deutsche Grammophon 453 4482
Peter Ilyich Tchaikovsky Hamlet Overture-Fantasia Symphony No. 5 in E minor	Mikhail Pletnev	Deutsche Grammophon 453 4492
Peter Ilyich Tchaikovsky Capriccio italien Symphony No. 6 in B minor – Pathétique Voyevoda	Mikhail Pletnev	Deutsche Grammophon 453 4502
Igor Stravinsky Canon on a Russian Popular Tune Scherzo à la russe Symphony in E-flat major Suite from The Firebird	Mikhail Pletnev	Deutsche Grammophon 453 4342
Peter Ilyich Tchaikovsky Symphony No. 1 in G minor – Winter Daydreams Symphony No. 2 in C minor – Little Russian Symphony No. 3 in D major Symphony No. 4 in F minor Symphony No. 5 in E minor Symphony No. 6 in B minor – Pathétique	Mikhail Pletnev	Deutsche Grammophon 449 9672
1995
Nikolai Miaskovsky Cello Concerto in C minor Sergei Prokofiev Sinfonia Concertante for Violin, Cello and Orchestra Mischa Maisky, cello	Mikhail Pletnev	Deutsche Grammophon 449 8212
1994
Sergei Prokofiev Cinderella – Ballet in Three Acts Summer Night, Suite for Orchestra from Betrothal in a Monastery	Mikhail Pletnev	Deutsche Grammophon 445 8302
Antonin Dvořák Slavonic Dances	Mikhail Pletnev	Deutsche Grammophon 447 0562
The Enchanted Kingdom Anatoly Liadov Baba-Yaga Kikimora The Enchanted Lake Nikolai Rimsky-Korsakov The Golden Cockerel, Suite for Orchestra Alexander Tcherepnin The Distant Princess The Enchanted Kingdom	Mikhail Pletnev	Deutsche Grammophon 447 0842
Sergei Rachmaninov Symphony No. 2 in E minor The Rock – Fantasy Peter Ilyich Tchaikovsky The Tempest Overture in F major Anatoly Liadov Baba-Yaga Kikimora The Enchanted Lake	Mikhail Pletnev	Deutsche Grammophon 459 0592
1993
Sergei Rachmaninov The Rock – Fantasy	Mikhail Pletnev	Deutsche Grammophon 439 8882
Peter Ilyich Tchaikovsky “Manfred” Symphony The Tempest	Mikhail Pletnev	Deutsche Grammophon 439 8912
Russian Overtures Alexander Borodin Overture, Prince Igor Alexander Glazunov Solemn Overture Mikhail Glinka Overture, Ruslan and Ludmila Dmitry Kabalevsky Overture, Colas Breugnon Modest Mussorgsky Overture, Khovanshchina Sergei Prokofiev Overture, Semyon Kotko Nikolai Rimsky-Korsakov Overture, The Tsar's Bride Dmitri Shostakovich Festive Overture Peter Ilyich Tchaikovsky Overture in F major	Mikhail Pletnev	Deutsche Grammophon 439 8922
1991
Peter Ilyich Tchaikovsky Symphony No. 6 in B minor – Pathétique Marche slave	Mikhail Pletnev	Virgin 759 66121
