= Lucas Debargue =

French pianist and composer (born 1990)

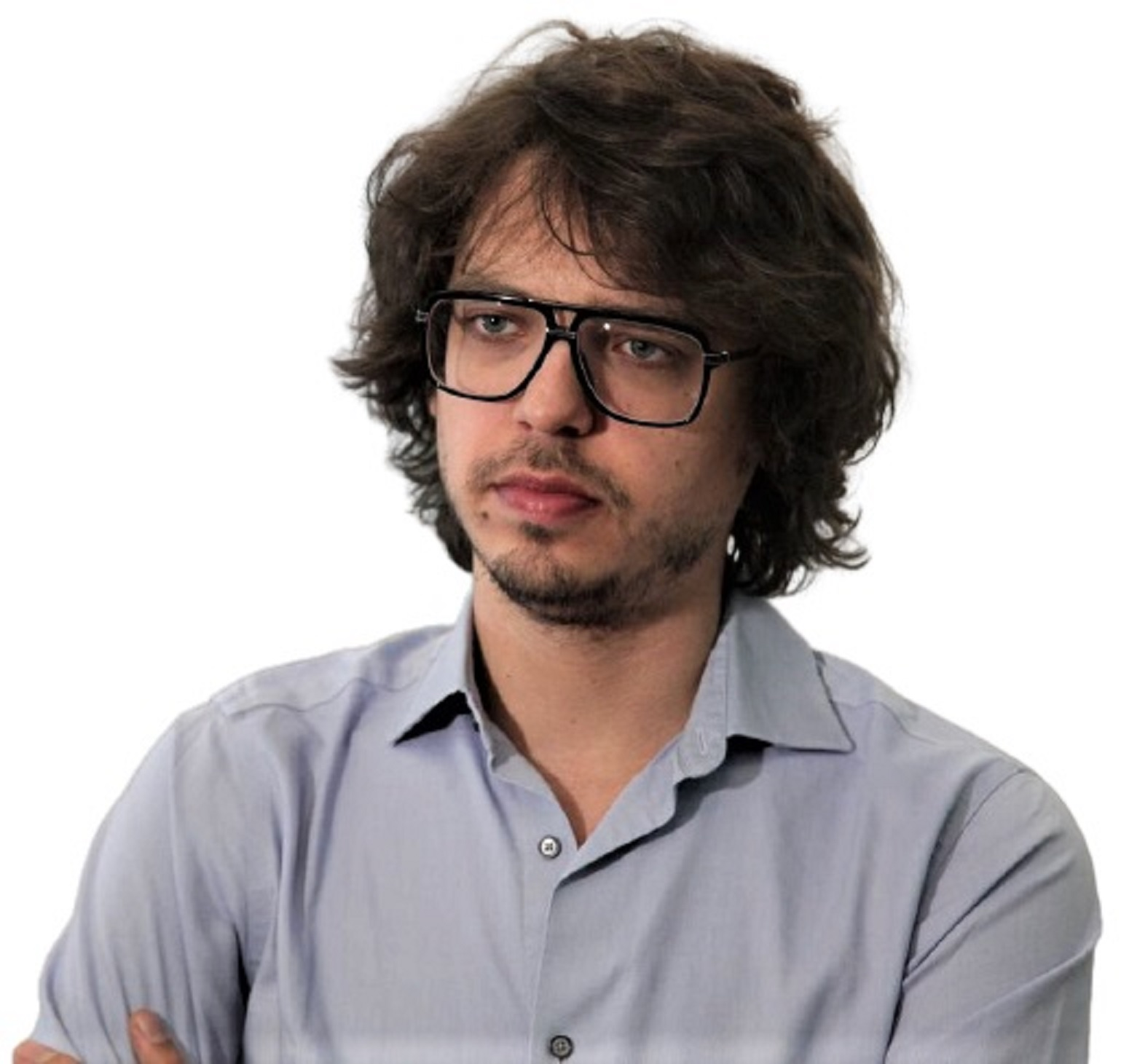
- Lucas Debargue in 2021.

Background information
- Born: 23 October 1990 (age 36); Paris, France
- Genre: Classical
- Occupations: Pianist, composer
- Instrument: Piano
- Label: Sony Classical
- Website: lucasdebargue.com

Lucas Debargue (born 23 October 1990) is a French pianist and composer. He was awarded fourth prize at the XV International Tchaikovsky Competition.

== Early life and education ==
Lucas Debargue was born in Paris, France, on 23 October 1990. He grew up in a family of non-musicians in Compiègne. His mother is a nurse and his father is a physiotherapist He took his first piano lessons at the music school in Compiègne at the age of 10 with teacher Christine Muenier. He stopped his piano studies at age 15, as he became more interested in literature. At 17, he moved to Paris to study for a degree in arts and literature at Paris Diderot University and graduated it with a Licence degree.

In 2010, he was invited to perform at the Fête de la Musique festival in Compiègne. He met piano teacher Rena Shereshevskaya who invited him to study with her at the École Normale de Musique de Paris, joining in 2012. During this period he decided to become a professional musician. Debargue graduated under direction of Rena Shereshevskaya in 2016 with the school's highest recognition, the Prix Cortot.

== Career ==
In 2015, Debargue was selected to participate in the XV International Tchaikovsky Competition. Arriving there unknown, his individual performances attracted attention. The second round was the breakthrough where his expressive performance and unexpected program - the little-played Nikolai Medtner Sonata No. 1 in F Minor and Maurice Ravel "Gaspard de la Nuit" was particularly impressive. Debargue was awarded fourth prize and received the special prize of Moscow music critics.

In 2015, Debargue signed with Sony Classical. In current time he is AMC - Artists Management Company artist with general manager Franco Panozzo and collaborates with Primavera Consulting.

He has performed in Philharmonie de Paris, Carnegie Hall in New York and Elbphilharmonie in Hamburg. He is a regular artist at Verbier festival, Tsinandali festival, Festival de La Roque-d'Anthéron Festival de Pâques d'Aix-en-Provence.

Debargue has collaborated with conductors Ludovic Morlot, Lorenzo Viotti, Elim Chan, Esa-Pekka Salonen, Andrey Boreyko, Laurence Equilbey Tarmo Peltokoski Tugan Sokhiev, Sascha Goetzel, Antonello Manacorda and Gabor Takacs-Nagy.

His chamber music partners include Gidon Kremer, Klaus Mäkelä, Janine Jansen, Martin Fröst, Renaud Capucon, Edgar Moreau, Lisa Batiashvili, Daniel Hope, Kristof Barati, Camille Thomas, Marc Bouchkov, Alexandra Conunova, David Castro-Balbi, Alexandre Castro-Balbi, Eva Zavaro, Jerome Pernoo, Adrien Boisseau, Quatuor Terpsycordes, and Ébène Quartet. Debargue works regularly with Kremerata Baltica. In 2019 Gidon Kremer named him "Kremerata Baltica permanent guest".

In 2017 Debargue was awarded ECHO Klassik prize.

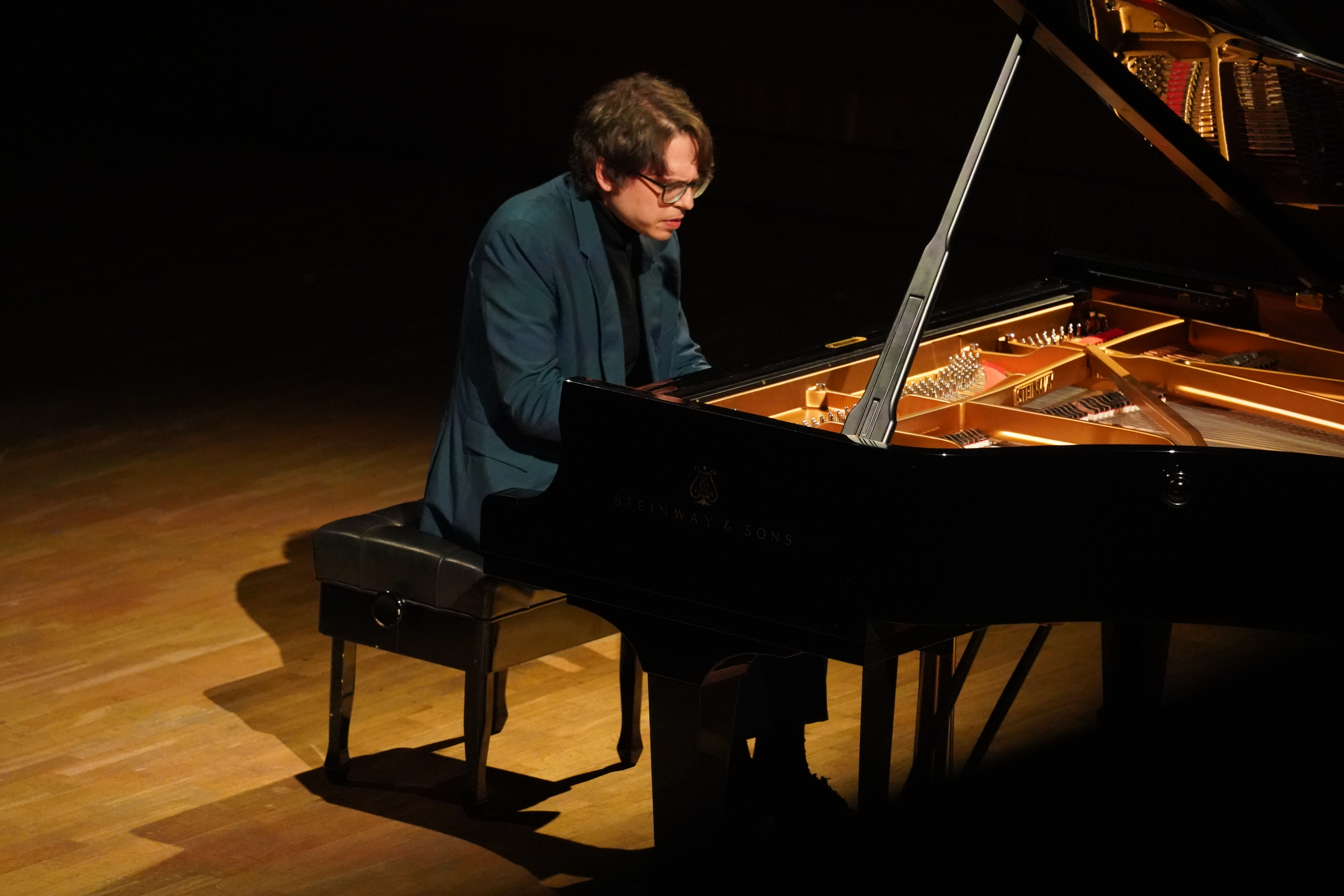

Debargue has composed chamber music pieces, such as Trio for violin, cello and piano, Quatuor Symphonique for piano quartet, Cello Sonata, Violin Sonata,String Quartet, Piano Quintet. His works include many piano pieces, such as Toccata, Scherzo, "Menuet Triste", "2ème pièce pour piano: Prelude and Fugue in G Minor", "3ème pièce pour piano: Barcarolle in F Minor", Suite in D Minor and Concertino for piano, string orchestra and drums. He has also composed vocal music: songs on the words of Charles Baudelaire.

Debargue has a long-standing collaboration with French piano builder Stephen Paulello. On Paulello's innovative Opus 102 Concert Grand, Debargue has given concerts at the Philharmonie de Paris and recorded his latest album "Fauré: Complete Music for Solo Piano" for Sony Classical.

With the release of his album "Fauré: Complete Music for Solo Piano" in 2024, Debargue also recorded a series of video interviews on the subject of Gabriel Fauré. In 2025, he was a guest on video podcasts of French pianists, youtubers and influencers French Piano Guys – Aurélien Froissart and Julien Cohen and Etienne Guéreau. He has also written several essays on musical topics.

In 2017 a documentary directed by Martin Mirabel (Bel Air productions), "Lucas Debargue: To Music", was released. The documentary received International Classical Music Award for the best music documentary in 2021 and was selected for the FIPA in Biarritz in 2018.

== Compositions ==
Chamber Music

- Concertino, for piano, string orchestra and drums (2017), premiered by the composer and Kremerata Baltica in Cesis (Latvia).
- Quatuor Symphonique, for piano quartet (2018), premiered in the Centre de Musique de Chambre de Paris by the composer and Eva Zavaro (violin), Adrien Boisseau (viola) and Jerome Pernoo (cello).
- Trio No 1, for violin, cello and piano (2019), premiered in Théâtre des Champs-Elysées by the composer and David Castro-Balbi (violin) Alexandre Castro-Balbi (cello).
- Sonata for cello and piano (2019)
- Sonata for violin and piano (2020), commissioned and premiered for festival « Les Vacances de Monsieur Haydn » by Eva Zavaro and the composer
- String Quartet No1 « Aus Wien » (2021) premiered for festival « Les Vacances de Monsieur Haydn »
- String Quartet No2 « Élégie » (2022) premiered in Victoria Hall, Geneva, by the Terpsycordes string quartet
- Piano Quintet for 2 violins, viola, cello and piano (2023)
- Trio No 2, for violin, cello and piano (2025), commissioned and premiered for Festival des Forêts by the composer and David Castro-Balbi (violin) Alexandre Castro-Balbi (cello)

Piano solo

- Toccata in B Minor (2019)
- Scherzo in A Minor (2020)
- 2ème pièce pour piano: Prelude and Fugue in G Minor (2020)
- 3ème pièce pour piano: Barcarolle in F Minor (2020)
- Mazurka No1 in B flat Major (2022)
- Menuet Triste in F sharp Minor (2023)
- Mazurka No2 in E Major (2024)
- Suite in D Minor, in 5 parts (2024) : French overture, Pantomime, Sarabande, War Minuet and Gigue.

== Discography ==
=== Solo recordings ===
Release date	Album	Label
8 April 2016	Scarlatti, Chopin, Liszt, Ravel	Sony Classical
23 September 2016	Bach, Beethoven, Medtner	Sony Classical
27 October 2017	Schubert, Szymanowski	Sony Classical
4 October 2019	Scarlatti 52 Sonatas	Sony Classical
8 March 2024	Fauré: Complete Music for Solo Piano	Sony Classical
11 September 2026	Gershwin Variations	Sony Classical

=== Collaboration albums ===
Release date	Album	Partners	Label
3 November 2017	Messiaen : Quatuor pour la fin du temps	Martin Fröst, Janine Jansen, Torleif Thedéen	Sony Classical
27 August 2021	Zal - The Music of Miłosz Magin	Gidon Kremer, Kremerata Baltica	Sony Classical
31 March 2023	Mozart: Ecstasy & Abyss	Martin Fröst, Swedish Chamber Orchestra	Sony Classical
9 June 2023	The Chopin Project : Trilogy	Camille Thomas, Julien Brocal, Daniel Hope, Frans Helmerson et al.	Deutsche Grammophon
