= Jean-Pascal Beintus =

French composer

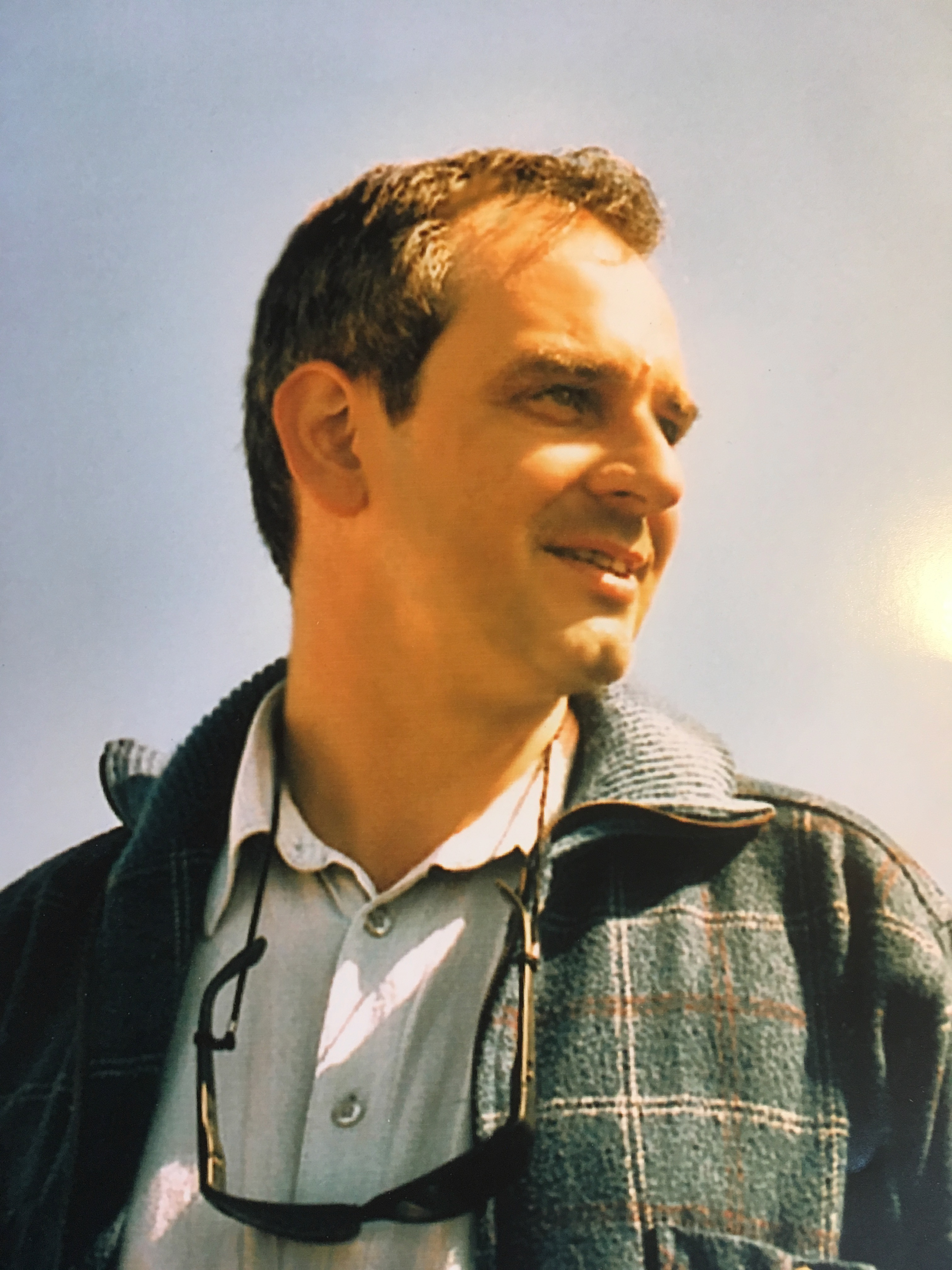
Jean-Pascal Beintus

Jean-Pascal Beintus (born 1966) is a French composer.

Beintus was born in Toulouse. He studied double bass and composition at the conservatories of Nice, Lyon and Paris during the 1980s. When Sir John Eliot Gardiner created the Lyon Opéra Orchestra in 1983, he selected Beintus as a founding double bass player. His first work, Samskara, was for double bass and chamber orchestra.

In 1996 Kent Nagano, then music director of the Opéra de Lyon, recognized Jean-Pascal Beintus's talents as composer and began to commission works from him: a concerto for orchestra, a concerto for clarinet and orchestra. Since then, he has written music for nearly every type of ensemble, concert hall and film. He composed a stage music for Le Petit Prince by Antoine de Saint-Exupéry.

Recent commissions have come from the Berlin Philharmonic (He's Got Rhythm: Homage to George Gershwin), the Russian National Orchestra (Wolf Tracks and Peter and the Wolf), the Manchester Hallé Orchestra (Couleurs Cuivres), the Berkeley Symphony (Berkeley Images, Luna Tree and Bremen Town Musicians), the Philippine Philharmonic Orchestra (Kobe Symphony, which was featured on David Benoit's 2005 release, Orchestral Stories, on Peak Records), Orchestre de Paris (Cordes et Lames), the State of California (Manzanar: An American Story), the Massachusetts Institute of Technology (Nature Suite), the Orchestre Symphonique de Montreal, (Shoka, Diana Damrau), the Accademia Nazionale di Santa Cecilia Orchestra, (concerto for clarinet), the Deutsches Symphonie-Orchester Berlin, and the London Symphony Orchestra, (Le Petit Prince).

Beintus's film work includes the original score of the Leonardo DiCaprio film The 11th Hour, as well as orchestrating Alexandre Desplat's scores for Syriana and Golden Globe-winning score of The Painted Veil, and also The Queen, Fantastic Mr. Fox, The Imitation Game, "Harry Potter and the Deathly Hallows: Part 1", "Harry Potter and the Deathly Hallows: Part 2", "Jurassic World Rebirth" and Godzilla, The Shape of Water.

A recording of Jean-Pascal Beintus's "Wolf Tracks" featuring Bill Clinton, Mikhail Gorbachev and Sophia Loren as narrators received a 2003 Grammy Award. Antonio Banderas narrated the Spanish version, released in 2007.

His recent projects are the original music of the French TV Star Michel Cymès's documentary based on his book Hippocrates in the Underworld, performed by Renaud Capuçon, and a Fantaisie Concertante for piano, trumpet and orchestra premiered in June 2018 by the Orchestra of Auvergne.
