= Newport Classical =

Classical music festival and organisation

Coordinates: 41.4796°N 71.3123°W

Newport Classical (Newport Music Festival)
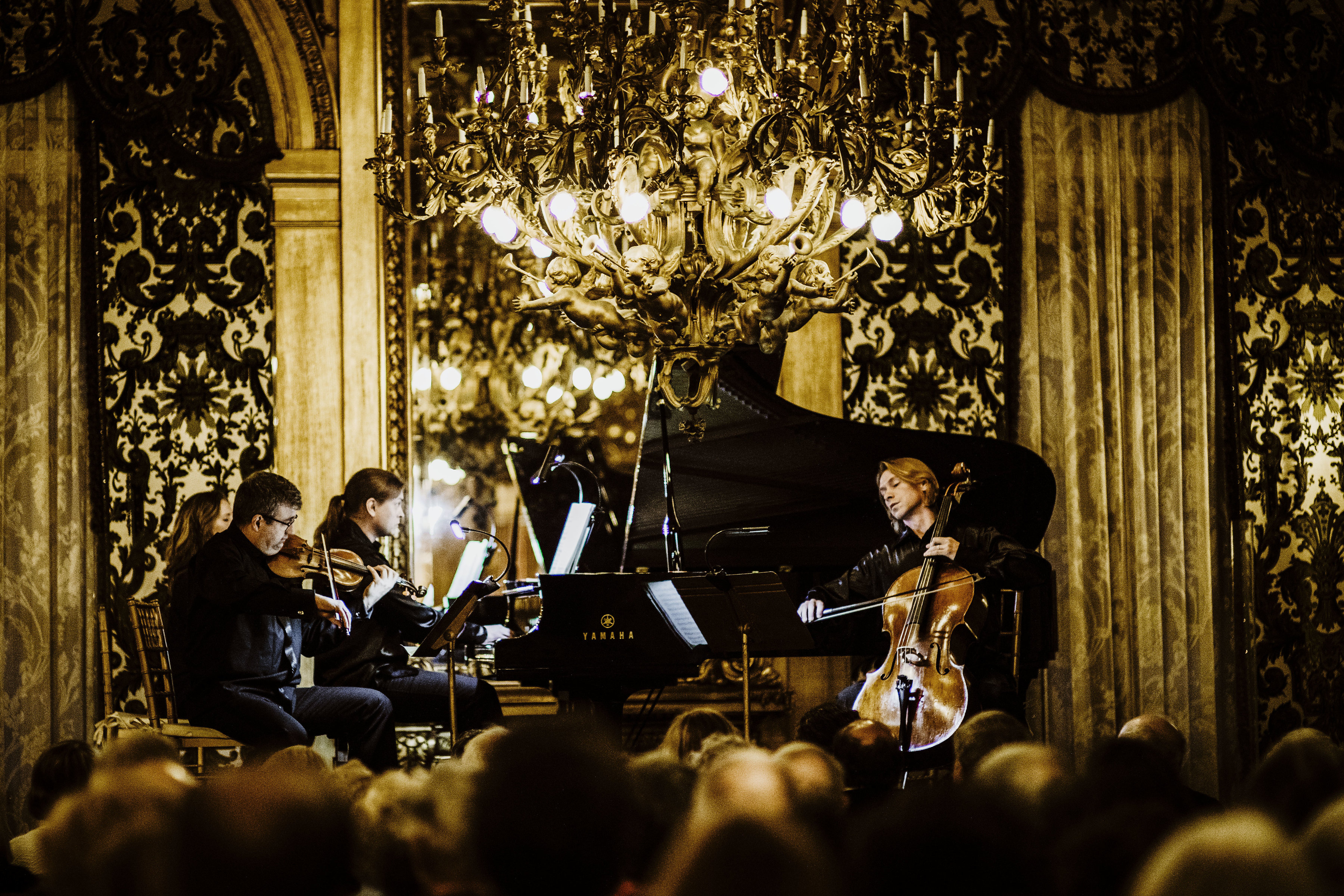
- Hermitage Piano Trio performs at Marble House
- Genre: Chamber Music and other genres
- Venue: Historic Newport Mansions and Venues
- Locations: Newport, Rhode Island, U.S.A.
- Years active: 1969–present
- Inaugurated: 1969
- Most recent: July 1, 2022 – July 17, 2022
- Next event: July 4, 2023 – July 23, 2023
- Organizer: Rhode Island Arts Foundation at Newport Inc.
- Website: newportclassical.org

Newport Classical, previously known as the Newport Music Festival, is an annual chamber music-oriented festival and year-round classical music arts organization in Newport, Rhode Island, which began in July 1969. The festival consists of dozens of concerts each year, held in a variety of historic sites around town. The festival has hosted over 2,500 concerts featuring nearly 150 artists making their American debuts. The year-round programming includes a Chamber Series, with performances held at the Newport Classical Recital Hall, and Community Concerts, held in green spaces around Aquidneck Island.

== History ==
=== Early years ===
The Newport Metropolitan Opera Festival was founded in 1966, According to George Wein, who founded both Newport Jazz and Folk Festivals, the Newport Metropolitan Opera Foundation dissolved to form the non-profit Rhode Island Arts Foundation at Newport Inc. in 1968.

Glenn Sauls, who had worked at the Metropolitan Opera with Rudolf Bing, was hired as the first General Director and programmed the first summer season in 1969, with the full panoply of the performing arts, including; chamber music, ballet, film, vocal ensembles, and a full-scale performance of The Barber of Seville.

In 1971, year three of the Festival, Mr. Sauls noted,

You can well imagine how gratifying it is for those of us who have worked so hard to launch the Newport Music Festival in the face of formidable difficulties to now begin to detect a sense of permanence, and to have had our efforts as handsomely acknowledged as they recently were by Harold Schoenberg, the distinguished music critic of the New York Times. He wrote recently of the Newport Festival, “Serious musicians return season after season because they find much to admire in a forgotten repertory ignored by the Establishment. They love to play it, audiences love to hear it. There is no more relaxed, unusual and, in its own way, enterprising festival anywhere.

The Festival's partnership with the Preservation Society of Newport County realized the possibility of performing chamber music in the historic Newport Mansions, the kind of grand rooms for which that music had originally been written.

=== Mark Malkovich III ===
In 1975, Mark Malkovich III became the festival's General Director. Under his leadership, the Festival became world-renowned for presenting young international artists in their North American debuts, for providing a showcase for emerging American artists, and performing rare repertoire. As described by Richard Dyer,

The repertory that Mark chose for Newport was astounding in its extent, range, and variety. Over the years the Festival has presented the complete keyboard music and chamber music of every major composer from Bach through the mid-20th century, as well as an interesting sampling of music written since then. Mark placed familiar masterpieces alongside neglected works by the same composers; most programs were full of illuminating juxtapositions…

The Newport Festival became celebrated for the prestige of its debut artists; during Malkovich’s tenure more than 120 artists made their US debuts. Italian pianists Andrea Lucchesini and Pietro De Maria, French violinists Augustin Dumay and Raphael Oleg, and pianists Jean-Phillipe Collard, François-René Duchâble and Alain Jacquon all had their American debuts at the Newport Music Festival.

Before his death in 2010, Malkovich had curated 36 consecutive seasons and led the Festival to prominence both locally and internationally.

=== Mark Malkovich IV ===
In 2008, Mark Malkovich IV, assumed the title of General Manager and was later conferred leadership of the organization following his father's death. The younger Malkovich shared his father's passion and brought his own vision to the organization. While still devoted to the Romantic era, the Festival began to feature a broader range of musical periods. Bach to Bernstein and new works by both established and emerging composers, became part of the repertoire, as well as discoveries of forgotten minor masterpieces. Examples include the world premiere of a four-hand Andante Cantabile by Claude Debussy, found in a manuscript at the Pierpont Morgan Library in New York, and an unknown Prelude of Rachmaninoff, found at the Library of Congress in Washington.

Malkovich and his mother, Joan Malkovich, retired from the festival after the 2017 season. Pamela A. Pantos became the new executive director.

The 50th anniversary season (July 4–22, 2018) featured a broadening of the festival's musical landscape — celebrating the anniversaries of Rossini, Debussy and Bernstein — and included works by living composers. The festival continued to honor its legacy by presenting the Mark P. Malkovich III Memorial Concert, the highly regarded French Opera Night and three Sunrise Concerts at the Chinese Tea House. It also renewed its pledge to the local community and visitors to Newport by presenting free public concerts and strengthening its commitment to local artists and music programs.

=== Today ===
On November 22, 2020, the board of directors of the Newport Music Festival appointed Gillian Friedman Fox as the organization's new executive director. During her recent tenure at the Dallas Symphony Orchestra, Fox received critical acclaim for curating innovative and thought-provoking classical music performances and programs. Fox will usher in a new era for the festival as it enters its 53rd season in 2021.

On October 8, 2021, the organization went through a name change and rebranding, following an extensive audit by Sametz Blackstone Associates. Moving forward the organization will be known as Newport Classical, better reflecting the current mission of looking toward the future and celebrating the diversity of expression within the art form through year-round programming.

== Festival lineups ==
Notable past performers at the Newport Music Festival include:

- 1976: Andrei Gavrilov (American Debut)
- 1979: The Swingle Singers, Bella Davidovich (American Debut)
- 1982: Dimitris Sgouros (American Debut)
- 1989: Pascal Roge, Bert Lucarelli, Eric Ruske, Paul Plishka, Ben Holt
- 1997: Valery Afanassiev (American Debut)
- 2007: Adam Golka, Jean-Philippe Collard, Henri Demarquette, Eugen Tichindeleanu, Daniel del Pino, Kevin Fitz-Gerald, Grigorios Zamparas, Alain Jacquon, Colorado Quartet, Valerie Wilson Morris, John Bayless, Hector Olivera, Jennifer Frautschi, Eric Ruske, Geoff Nuttall, Livia Sohn, Jiří Bárta, Eduardus Halim, Pedja Mužijević
- 2008: Sergey Antonov, Michael Endres, Eduardus Halim, Pedja Mužijević, Vadim Rudenko, Vanessa Wai Yin Wong, Igor Zubkovsky
- 2009: Alexander Romanovsky (American Debut)
- 2016: Sergey Antonov, Gergely Bogányi, Inna Faliks, Emmanuel Feldman, Kevin Fitz-Gerald, Lucyna Jarzabek, Lois Shapiro, Consuelo Sherba, Diego Tosi, Yang Wei, Grigorios Zamparas, Ecclesia Consort, Vienna Piano Trio
- 2017: Inna Faliks, John Ferguson, Terezie Fialová
- 2018: Joshua Bell, Jake Heggie, Frederica Von Stade, Yaekwon Sunwoo, Imani Winds, Sergey Antonov, Ilya Kazantsev, Charlie Albright, Hermitage Piano Trio,
- 2019: The Swingle Singers, Sierra Boggess, Marc-André Hamelin, Charlie Albright,
- 2021: A Far Cry, Harlem Quartet, Third Coast Percussion, Aaron Diehl, Boston Trio, Lara Downes, Sergey Antonov & Ilya Kazantsev, Lara Deutsch & Rupert Boyd, Chanticleer, Brooklyn Rider, Anthony McGill
- 2022: Orpheus Chamber Orchestra with Chad Hoopes, Gavilán Brothers and a World Premiere by Shawn Okpebholo, Johannes Moser & Marc-André Hamelin, The King’s Singers, Sō Percussion, Joyce Yang, Junction Trio, Spektral Quartet, and more!
- 2023: Sinta Quartet, Simone Dinnerstein, Aizuri Quartet, Cantus, Amit Peled, Zlatomir Fung, Hélène Grimaud, Eldbjørg Hemsing, Philharmonia Baroue Orchestra, Hermitage Trio, Charlie Albright, Kelli O'Hara, Excelsis Percussion Quartet, Anthony McGill & Anna Polonsky, and a World Premiere by Curtis Stewart
