= Igor Zubkovsky =

Russian cellist (born 1971)

Igor Zubkovsky (born 10 March 1971) is a Russian cellist.

== Music career ==
=== Education ===
Igor Zubkovsky started playing cello at the Gnessin Music School in Moscow and first appeared as a soloist with the Minsk State Philharmonic Orchestra at the age of twelve, performing Haydn C Major Cello Concerto.

In 1994, Zubkovsky graduated from the Moscow Tchaikovsky Conservatory where he studied cello with Natalia Shakhovskaya, the First Prize Winner and a Gold Medalist of the 1962 Tchaikovsky Competition, and chamber music with Alexander Bonduriansky. He then went on to earn a postgraduate degree which he completed in 1997.

He was awarded a full scholarship to the Peabody Conservatory of Music in Baltimore, Maryland where in 1999 he earned a Graduate Performance Diploma.

=== Competitions ===
Zubkovsky won top prizes at the several international competitions, including Diploma at the International Jeunesses Musicales Competition in Belgrade, Yugoslavia, Second Prize at the International Cello Competition in Minsk, Belarus, and the Grand Prix at the First Tansman International Competition of Musical Personalities in Łódź, Poland. As part of the prize, he recorded a CD on DUX label and was invited to perform Alexandre Tansman's Fantasie with Lodz Philharmonic under conductor Paweł Przytocki.

In 1992-1997 Zubkovsky was a member of the critically acclaimed ensemble Brahms Trio in Moscow. With the group he won Second Prize at the International Chamber Music Competition in Trapani, Sicily and First Prize at the Joseph Joachim Chamber Music Competition in Weimar, Germany.

=== Performances ===
Igor Zubkovsky has an active concert life, playing solo and chamber music recitals and performing as a soloist with orchestras.

He has performed with such orchestras as the Belarusian State Philharmonic, the Voronezh State Symphony Orchestra, the Kishinev State Symphony Orchestra, Moscow Conservatory Symphony Orchestra, Belgrade Philharmonic Orchestra, Lodz Philharmonic, Harrisburg Symphony Orchestra, University of Maryland Symphony Orchestra, Altoona Symphony Orchestra, and West Chester University Symphony Orchestra. In addition to numerous appearances in Russia and the United States, he has performed in Belarus, Moldova, Great Britain, Poland, Austria, Italy, Spain, Germany, France, Finland, Australia, Turkey and Taiwan.

Zubkovsky has collaborated with such prominent musicians as pianists Stephen Prutsman, Ann Schein, Rohan de Silva, Michael Endres, Alexander Melnikov, Olga Kern, Bernadene Blaha, Daniel del Pino, Judith Lynn Stillman and Pedja Muzijevic, clarinetists Evgeny Petrov and Anton Dressler, singers Marianna Busching and Danielle Talamantes, violinists Earl Carlyss of Juilliard String Quartet, Odin Rathnam, Eugeny Bushkov, Emil Chudnovsky and Natasha Korsakova, violist Yuri Bashmet, and the members of the Borodin Quartet.

He has appeared at the Weill Recital Hall and Merkin Concert Hall in New York City, the Kennedy Center in Washington, DC, Bolshoi and Maly Hall of the Moscow Conservatory, the Kolarac Hall in Belgrade, the Hall of Columns of the Moscow Palace of Unions, National Gallery of Art, Corcoran Gallery of Art and Department of State in Washington, D.C. As a chamber musician, he also participated at the Schwetzingen Festival, Kuhmo Chamber Music Festival, Newport Music Festival and Lancaster Festival.

== Works ==
Zubkovsky's repertoire is broad and versatile. It ranges across various periods and styles: music of the Renaissance and Baroque, original music for cello from the 19th and early 20th centuries, and music of the 20th and 21st centuries, as well as compositions for cello with orchestra and chamber music.

Zubkovsky has been recorded on numerous CDs - with the Fam Trio (playing works of Beethoven, Schumann and Brahms), with the Capital Trio (Mendelssohn and Babajanian). He is a tenured member of the Kennedy Center Opera House Orchestra and the Harrisburg Symphony Orchestra, and performing extensively as a soloist and chamber musician.

== Cello transcriptions and arrangements ==
Johannes Brahms, Sonatas for Clarinet and Piano, op. 120

Johannes Brahms, Andante from Piano Concerto No.2

Franz von Suppé, Overture to "Poet and Peasant"

Ferenc Liszt, Hungarian Rhapsody No.5

Nikolai Rimsky-Korsakov, Suite from the opera "Snow Maiden"

Mikhail Glinka, Sonata for viola and piano in D minor (incomplete) (1835)

Sergey Prokofiev, Suite from ballet "Cinderella"

Handel-Halvorsen, Sarabande con Variazioni in G minor on a Theme by George Frideric Handel for violin and cello (1897) (based on the original version for violin and viola)

Francis Poulenc

Robert Schumann, Märchenerzählungen for clarinet, cello and piano, Op. 132 (originally for clarinet, viola and piano)

Johannes Brahms, Two Songs, for contralto, cello and piano, Op. 91 (originally for contralto, viola and piano)

Mikhail Glinka, Trio Pathétique in D minor for viola, cello and piano (originally for clarinet, bassoon/cello and piano)

Reinhold Glière, Andante for piano, clarinet and cello (originally Concerto for coloratura soprano and orchestra in F minor, Op. 82 (1943)

== Arrangements for string trio ==
Georges Bizet, Prelude (from Les pêcheurs de perles)

Georges Bizet, Romance de Nadir 'Je crois entendre encore' (from Les pêcheurs de perles)

Léo Delibes, Sous le dôme épais (from Lakmé)

Giuseppe Verdi, Libiamo ne' lieti calici (from La traviata)

== Family ==
Igor's father is Sergey Rostislavovich Zubkovsky – Soviet and Russian composer, pianist.

== See also ==
- List of classical music competitions
