= Sviatoslav Knushevitsky =

Soviet-Russian classical cellist (1908–1963)

Sviatoslav Nikolayevich Knushevitsky (also seen as Knushevitzky; 6 January 1908 [O.S. 24 December 1907] – 19 February 1963) was a Soviet-Russian classical cellist. He was particularly noted for his partnership with the violinist David Oistrakh and the pianist Lev Oborin in a renowned piano trio from 1940 until his death. After Mstislav Rostropovich and Daniil Shafran, he is spoken of as one of the pre-eminent Russian cellists of the 20th century.

== Biography ==
Sviatoslav Knushevitsky was born at Petrovsk, Saratov Oblast, on 6 January 1908 [O.S. 24 December 1907]. He studied at the Moscow Conservatory with Semyon Kozolupov, graduating with a gold medal. He joined the Bolshoi Theatre Orchestra in 1929, remaining their principal cellist until 1943.

In 1933 Knushevitsky won First Prize at the All-Union Music Competition. In 1940 he joined in partnership with the violinist David Oistrakh and the pianist Lev Oborin in a renowned piano trio, often referred to as the Oistrakh Trio, which concertised and recorded a great deal in many countries. He also joined a string quartet with Oistrakh, Pyotr Bondarenko and Mikhail Terian, known as the Beethoven Quartet. His sonata performances with Oistrakh were considered the equal in their day of the later duo of Sviatoslav Richter and Mstislav Rostropovich.

In 1941 Knushevitsky joined the staff of the Moscow Conservatory, becoming a professor in 1950. From 1954 to 1959 he was chair of cello and double bass studies. His pupils there included the cellists Stefan Popov, Mikhail Khomitser and Yevgeny Altman, and the double bassist Rodion Azarkhin.

Cello concertos were written for him by:

- Nikolai Myaskovsky (Cello Concerto in C minor, 1944; premiered Moscow, 17 March 1945; the first recording, however, was made by Rostropovich in 1956)
- Aram Khachaturian (Cello Concerto in E minor, 1946; premiered Moscow, 30 October 1946; he had also written his Piano Concerto in D-flat in 1936 for Lev Oborin, and his Violin Concerto in D minor in 1940 for David Oistrakh), and
- Reinhold Glière (Cello Concerto in D minor, Op. 87, 1946).

Other composers who wrote for him were Sergei Vasilenko and Alexander Goedicke. His repertoire included mainstream works from concertos and chamber works through to smaller pieces and arrangements, along with contemporary and rarer works such as the Richard Strauss Cello Sonata and the Solo Cello Suites of Max Reger.

Sviatoslav Knushevitsky was an alcoholic, which, along with his frenetic lifestyle, contributed to his early death at the age of 55 in 1963, in Moscow.

== Family ==
Sviatoslav Knushevitsky's brother Victor (1906–1974) was a violinist and from 1936 the conductor of a renowned Russian jazz ensemble, the State Jazz Orchestra of the USSR.

His wife Natalia Shpiller (1909–1995) was a soprano soloist of the Bolshoi Theatre for over 30 years. She was a favourite of Joseph Stalin and often sang at the Kremlin. She taught at the Gnessin Institute 1950–1995.

== Awards and honors ==
- Order of the Red Banner of Labour (28 December 1946)
- Stalin Prize, 3rd class (1950)
- Medal "For Labour Valour" (9 July 1954)
- Honored Art Worker of the RSFSR (1956)

== Recordings ==
Sviatoslav Knushevitsky's many recordings include:

- Beethoven: Triple Concerto in C; Oborin, Oistrakh, Knushevitsky, with the Philharmonia Orchestra under Sir Malcolm Sargent
- Beethoven: Archduke Trio
- Borodin: String Sextet in D minor
- Brahms: Double Concerto, with Oistrakh and the USSR Symphony Orchestra under Karl Eliasberg
- Chopin: Piano Trio in G minor, Op. 8
- Dvořák: Piano Trio No. 4, Dumky Trio, Op. 90 and Trio in F minor, Op. 65
- Khachaturian: Cello Concerto in E minor (the premiere performance; and a later one conducted by Alexander Gauk)
- Myaskovsky: Cello Sonata No. 1 in D, Op. 12
- Popper: Cello Concerto in C
- Rachmaninoff: Cello Sonata in G minor, Op. 19
- Ravel: Piano Trio in A minor
- Rimsky-Korsakov: Piano Trio in C (1897, incomplete; completed 1939 by Maximilian Steinberg; world premiere recording)
- Saint-Saëns: Cello Concerto No. 1 in A minor, Op. 33
- Schubert: Octet in F major, D. 803
- Schubert: Piano Trio No. 1 in B-flat
- Schubert: Piano Trio No. 2 in E-flat
- Schumann: Piano Trio No. 2 in F, Op. 80
- Shostakovich: Piano Trio No. 2 in E minor, Op. 67
- Smetana: Piano Trio in G minor, Op. 15
- Tchaikovsky: Variations on a Rococo Theme, Op. 33 (conducted by Alexander Gauk)
- Tchaikovsky: Piano Trio in A minor, Op. 50
- Tchaikovsky: String Sextet in D minor, Souvenir de Florence, Op. 70, with Elizabeth Gilels (violin), Rudolf Barshai and Genrikh Talalyan (violas), and Mstislav Rostropovich (cello).

== Sources ==
- Presto Classical
