= Cello Concerto (Khachaturian) =

1946 Concerto by Aram Khachaturian

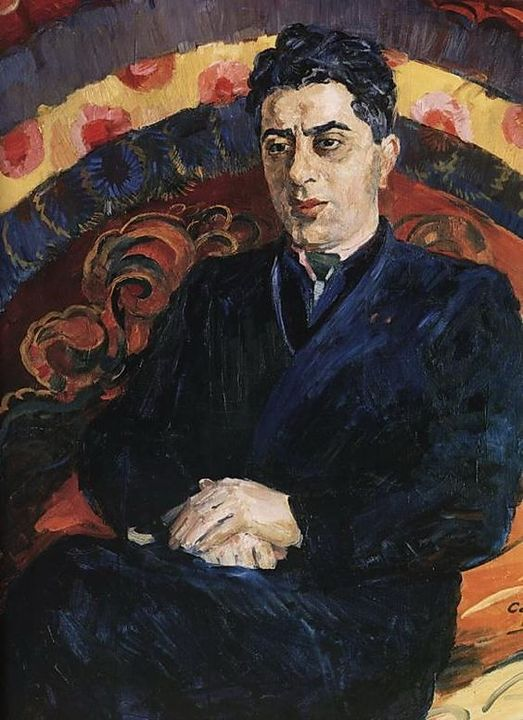
Portrait of Aram Khachaturian, 1944

Aram Khachaturian wrote his Cello Concerto in E minor in 1946 for Sviatoslav Knushevitsky. It was the last of the three concertos he wrote for the individual members of a renowned Soviet piano trio that performed together from 1941 until 1963. The others were: the Piano Concerto for Lev Oborin (1936); and the Violin Concerto for David Oistrakh (1940).

Although the last written of the three, the Cello Concerto was the first one Khachaturian had considered writing, when he was a cello student at the Gnessin Institute.

The work was premiered on 30 October 1946 (or November 1946), in the Great Hall of the Moscow Conservatory, with the dedicatee Sviatoslav Knushevitsky as soloist. The conductor was Aleksandr Gauk.

The Cello Concerto is the least known of the three concertos, and has not entered the core repertoire of cellists in the way the other two have for pianists and violinists, despite its difficulty level being comparable to the piano and violin concerti. It has received relatively few recordings.

The work is said to echo Khachaturian's painful experiences of war-time. It contains many allusions to folk material and dance rhythms such as the ashoug. It has been described as more of a symphony with cello than a cello concerto.

The three movements are:

1. Allegro moderato
2. Andante sostenuto
3. Allegro (a battuta).

The opening movement contains sections of a brooding quality, and even quotes the Dies Irae. It is rhapsodic and changeable in its moods. It contains a lengthy cadenza but has little by way of thematic development.

The central Andante has been described as 'introspective and melancholy', 'nocturnal and seductive', 'dramatic and stern', and 'menacing, oriental and melismatic'.

The third movement is full of bustle and tension. However, its energy level decreases until just near the end, when it concludes with a fast coda.

The work was one of the reasons Khachaturian was ousted from the Composers Union, and he and other Soviet composers were denounced for formalism in the Zhdanov Decree of 1948.
