= Pava Turtygina =

Russian composer

Pava Grigorevna Turtygina (26 December 1902 – 1985) was a Russian composer.

Turtygina was born in Gomel. She studied at the Ekaterinoslav Music School (1915-1919), today known as the Dnipropetrovsk Academy of Music in Ukraine; at the Gnessin State Musical College (1921-1922) with Elena Gnesina; and at the Moscow Conservatory (1938-1940).

Turtygina worked as a pianist. Her music was included on at least one LP recording: Aprelevka #7334 (1938). Her compositions were published by the State Music Publishing House known as Muzgiz or Muzyka, which in 2004 became P. Jurgenson. Her vocal compositions include:

- "Krasnoflotskaya" (text by Y. Rodionov)
- "Pod Znamenem" (Under the Banner; text by Aleksandr Kovalenkov)
- "Pokhodnaya Komsomolskaya" (text by I. Molchanov)
- "Spain Will Be Free" (text by Sergey Alymov)
