= Anatoly Dokumentov =

Russian pianist and composer

Anatoly Nikolayevich Dokumentov
- Анато́лий Никола́евич Докуме́нтов
- Born: December 19, 1937 (age 88); Kostroma, USSR
- Education: Central Musical School attached to Moscow Conservatory, Moscow Conservatory
- Occupations: Pianist, composer

Anatoly Nikolayevich Dokumentov (Russian: Анато́лий Никола́евич Докуме́нтов; born 19 December 1937) is a Russian pianist and composer.

== Biography ==
Dokumentov was born in Kostroma, USSR into a doctor's family. At the age of 5 he started learning the piano and at the age of 14 he entered the Central Musical School attached to Moscow Conservatory (Russian: ЦМШ – Центральная Музыкальная Школа при Московской Консерватории). He studied piano with Elena Petrovna Hoven (pupil of Aleksandr Borisovich Goldenweiser) and composition with professor Vissarion Yakovlevich Shebalin.

From 1956 to 1961 he studied at the Moscow Conservatory, initially with assistant professor Alexander Adrianovitch Yegorov (pupil of Konstantin Igumnov), then from 1959 at the class of professor Lev Nikolayevich Oborin. After graduating from the Higher Master School at Moscow Conservatory he studied composition with professor Nesterov (pupil of Vissarion Yakovlevich Shebalin) at Nizhny Novgorod Conservatory.

In 1961 Dokumentov moved back to Kostroma, working as a composer and performer at Kostroma Philharmonic Society and as a piano teacher. He is currently a professor of Nekrasov Kostroma State University.

In 1997 he worked with famous Russian producer Nikita Mikhalkov on the movie “The Barber of Siberia” where he arranged music, conducted the orchestra, played music, coached the actors for singing and was filmed.

He married pianist Natalia Ananievna Seliverstova in 1965. They have two children.

== Performances ==
Dokumentov started his career as a performer at the Malyj Zal of Moscow Conservatory (Russian: Малый Зал Московской Консерватории) at the age of 14 performing Partita C-minor by J.S.Bach. He has performed in USSR, Russia, Sweden, Denmark and Australia and with artists of Bolshoi Theatre; under the guidance of conductor Yury Aranovich (Principal conductor of Stockholm orchestra).

== Compositions ==
Dokumentov's music has been performed in USSR, Russia, Denmark, Sweden, Vatican City, Japan and Australia. Among other pieces there are:

Composition	Performances
Opera “Unheard-of miracle”	Acquired and publicly performed in 1997 by Samara State Opera Theatre
Opera “Unfinished etude”	Publicly performed in 1987 by Kostroma Philharmonic Society
The second cello sonata	Acquired by Ministry of Culture of Russia and publicly performed by X.Yuganova and Laureate of the Paris International Competition A.Yegorov widely in Russia since 1986 to 1990
The third cello sonata	Publicly performed by X.Yuganova and Laureate of the Paris International Competition A.Yegorov widely in Russia since 1988 to 1990
Four morning prayers of Makarios the Great	Publicly performed in Russia and Vatican City
Four pieces for string quartette “Russian little pictures”	Publicly performed by Sweden string quartette “Arcus”
Pieces “Three Russian moods” for two pianos	Published and publicly performed in Tokyo in 1997
“Granger phantasy” for 8 pianos	Acquired privately in Australia in 2008 and publicly performed in fragments in Melbourne Hamer Hall and Sydney Opera House
Symphonic composition “Three little pictures after A.Ostrovsky”	Publicly performed by Yaroslavle State Symphony Orchestra in 2001
Nine preludes for piano	Publicly performed by the author in Russia, Denmark, Australia and Sweden since 1977 to 2008
First concerto for piano and orchestra	Acquired by Ministry of Culture of Russia; publicly performed by the author and various orchestras in 1972, 1988; broadcast by Moscow radio in 1973
Suite for string orchestra	Publicly performed in the House of Composers in Moscow in 2004
Cycle after verses of V.Lapshin “Motherland”	Publicly performed by the Moscow Chamber Choir in the House of Composers in Moscow in 2003
Musicals “The secret of the Gold star”, “The ball of the flowers” and “The daughter of captain”	Acquired and publicly performed by Kostroma Philharmonic Society since 2001 to 2004
Opera “Tartuf”	Publicly performed in fragments
Opera “Kozma Minin”	Publicly performed in fragments

== Awards and recognitions ==
- Honorary Artist of Russia
- Medal for Honor, Labor and Valour
- Laureate of two Russian competitions of pianists (one together with N.Seliverstova)
- Winner of Honorary certificate of Tokyo International Competition of composers in 1997

== Bibliography ==
- Historical Kosrtroma encyclopedia pp. 94–95.
- Journal of Russian Union of Composers “Musycalnaya Academia” 2003 p. 104
- Magazine “Musical Life” 1972 issue 15
- Journal “Soviet Music” 1976 issue 6
- Magazine “Soviet Union” 1979 issue 2
- Elizabeth Ogonkova, essay “Pianist” in the book “Moi Neschastlivtsevy” (Russian: «Мои Несчастливцевы»)
- Newspaper “Frederikssund Avis” 15 October 1996, “Glow and Spirit”
