= Heghine =

Heghine (Հեղինե) is a personal name of Armenian origin.

- Kim Kardashian, baptized with the name
- Heghine Rapyan (born 1985), pianist of Armenian origin
- Heghine Grigorian (Armenian: Հեղինե Գրիգորյան, born 1989) or Egine (Armenian: Իջին, Russian: Иджùн) or Ezhine, Armenian-Russian singer and songwriter
