= Violin Concerto (Khachaturian) =

1940 composition by Aram Khachaturian

- by Aram Khachaturian
- Key: D minor
- Opus: 46
- Composed: summer 1940
- Dedication: David Oistrakh
- Duration: 35–39 minutes
- Movements: 3

Premiere
- Date: 16 November 1940
- Location: Moscow
- Performers: David Oistrakh

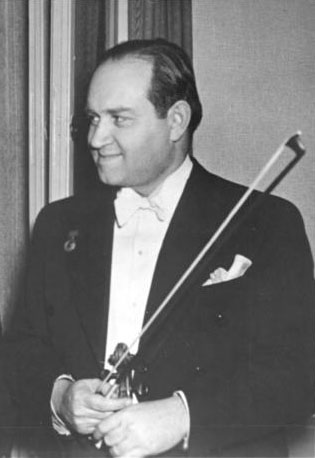
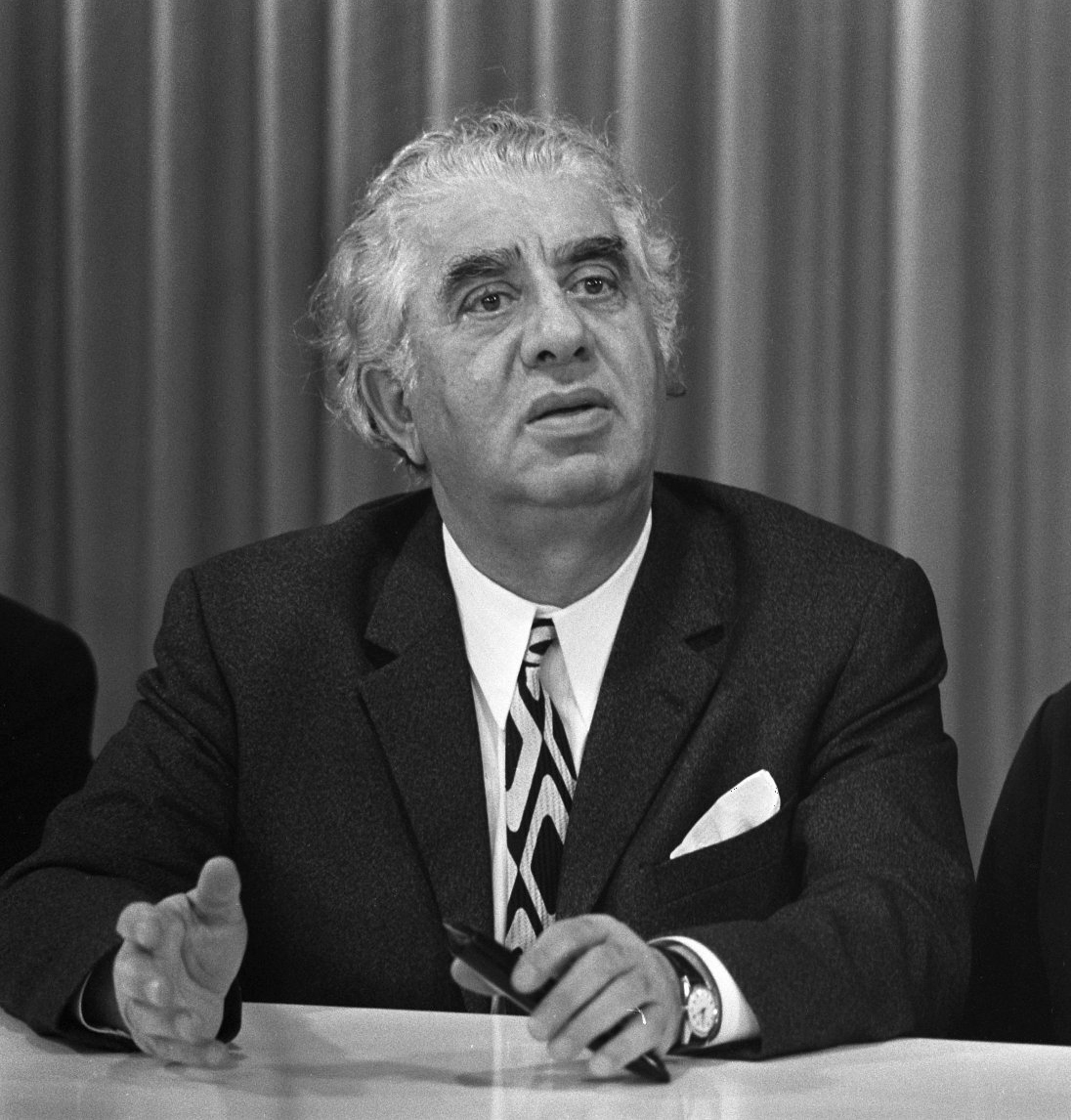
Oistrakh and Khachaturian

The Violin Concerto in D minor, Op. 46, is a concerto for violin and orchestra by Aram Khachaturian composed in 1940. Dedicated to the violinist David Oistrakh, it was premiered the same year in Moscow with Oistrakh as soloist and Alexander Gauk conducting. The work blends Armenian folk influences with late-Romantic idioms and classical formal design. Widely praised for its lyrical themes and rhythmic energy, the concerto brought Khachaturian immediate acclaim and earned him a Stalin Prize and was adopted internationally. Though its popularity declined in the later twentieth century, the concerto has since regained attention and remains one of Khachaturian's most frequently performed compositions.

== History ==
Khachaturian composed the concerto within two months in the summer of 1940, dedicating it to David Oistrakh. While living in his country home in Staraya Ruza not far from Moscow, he was filled with artistic excitement after the success of his ballet Happiness (later reworked into Gayane) and while awaiting the birth of his son. Oistrakh was immediately captivated by the work, leaving an "unforgettable impression at the time". He later wrote, "It was clear that a vivid composition had been born, destined to live long on the concert stage." Fellow composer Dmitry Kabalevsky, who was present at the first performance at Khachaturian's cottage, wrote that its first professional audience was "greatly impressed" by the concerto due to its "bold contrasts of unrestrained joy, gentle lyricism, and tense drama".

Oistrakh collaborated closely with Khachaturian, suggesting refinements and ultimately replacing the composer's original cadenza, which he found too long, with one of his own based on the concerto's themes. Khachaturian admired and approved Oistrakh's cadenza—later joking that he would "claim it as [his] own", though he also remarked that his original effort had been "a complete waste of time". Oistrakh's version has become the standard in performance.

It premiered on November 16, 1940 with Oistrakh as the soloist and Alexander Gauk conducting the USSR State Symphony Orchestra at the opening day of the Festival of Soviet Music in Moscow's Tchaikovsky Hall. Attending its premiere were Nikolai Myaskovsky, Sergei Prokofiev, and Dmitri Shostakovich. Violinist Leonid Kogan, 16 at the time, was also in attendance and later stated that it "seemed to us to be extremely difficult, almost impossible to perform". Oistrakh and Gauk went on to perform the concerto in Leningrad, Yerevan, Tbilisi, Kiev, and Odessa, receiving admiration.

== Structure ==
The piece follows the traditional three-movement form. The solo violin maintains a dominant, virtuosic role, while the orchestra alternates between accompaniment, embellishment, and thematic competition.

1. Allegro con fermezza (14–15 minutes)
2. Andante sostenuto (about 12 minutes)
3. Allegro vivace (about 9 minutes)

=== I. Allegro con fermezza ===
The opening Allegro con fermezza begins with a descending orchestral gesture, followed by the soloist's introduction of an folk-inflected main theme derived in spirit from the Armenian folk song "Kele, Kele" ("Procession"). The theme exhibits dance-like character and rhythmic vitality, featuring a principal motif contained within the range of a third. A lyrical secondary theme, introduced by oboe, provides contrast through its cantabile character. Both themes, rooted in Armenian musical traditions, develop freely with elements of song and dance. The development section features imaginative orchestration that contrasts and combines both themes through harmonious interplay. A substantial cadenza, occupied mainly with the secondary theme, appears mid-movement and bridges to a modified recapitulation. The movement concludes with a commanding coda that reaffirms the opening theme and D minor tonality.

=== II. Andante sostenuto ===
The Andante sostenuto develops the lyrical atmosphere introduced in the first movement's secondary theme, transforming it into a broad, contemplative song characterized by poetic meditation. The movement opens with a recitative introduction by bassoon and lower strings, succeeded by stabbing brass chords, before the soloist presents the main theme—an impassioned "Armenian serenade" that embodies a love song. The theme develops through improvisatory expansion and rich orchestral color, growing from quiet introspection to a passionate climax. A contrasting middle section introduces melancholic improvisation with restless, recitative lyricism over an ostinato orchestral background, recalling the expressive style of Armenian ashugs. This episode conveys yearning and tender melancholy, sounding elegiac and anxiously pensive. The recapitulation brings the love song back with renewed warmth, beginning in the violin's low register before rising to full orchestral expression. The movement closes with a gentle coda that returns to the shadows from which it emerged, with the descending figure from the first movement's main theme appearing at the very end.

=== III. Allegro vivace ===
The Allegro vivace finale, conceived as an ode to joy, is written in free rondo-sonata form. It begins with a festive orchestral tutti in D major that recalls the rhythmic-intonational contours of the first movement's opening theme, followed by the soloist's main melody. The movement captivates with rapidly changing motifs full of enthusiasm, dance rhythms, and polyrhythmic effects, creating a vivid picture of folk festivity and jubilation. A contrasting secondary theme in F-sharp major complements the principal theme, with both treated in continuous exposition-development. The development section features a transformed return of the lyrical theme from the first movement in new rhythmic guise, driven by rhythmic ostinato that fuses lyrical and dance elements. A central poetic episode synthesizes motifs from all three movements into a composite idea, culminating in an orchestral climax. The recapitulation brings the triumphant return of the principal theme, followed by a contrapuntal combination of the finale's refrain with the first movement's secondary theme in the coda, symbolizing the merging of song and dance principles central to the concerto's dramaturgy. The movement concludes with an expansive D-major coda that affirms the strength of the opening theme, achieving a forceful and decisive conclusion.

== Instrumentation ==
Instrumentation includes the piccolo, two flutes, two oboes, English horn, two clarinets, two bassoons, four horns, three trumpets, three trombones, tuba, timpani, percussion (tambourine, snare drum, bass drum, triangle, cymbals, tam-tam, glockenspiel, xylophone), harp, strings, and solo violin.

== Analysis ==
Levon Hakobian argues that while like his Piano Concerto it is "unmistakably Armenian", Khachaturian's Violin Concerto is "more even-tempered" with its thematic elements "more tightly embedded in the classical European formal scheme". Critics have described it as "unashamedly Romantic", "lushly neo-Romantic", and "continuing directly the lineage of large-scale Romantic violin concertos" such as that by Tchaikovsky. René Spencer Saller suggested that its "harmonic language screams late Romantic nationalist; there is nothing remotely modern about it". Soviet critic Georgi Khubov suggested that while Khachaturian's concerto shares some surface similarities with Mendelssohn's concerto—both are virtuosic, song-like, and bright in character—they differ fundamentally in their aesthetic approaches. Khachaturian rejects Mendelssohn's romantic idealism in favor of a realism rooted in national identity and tangible folk imagery, creating music for mass audiences rather than salon culture.

It is full of Armenian folk motifs, inspired partly by Khachaturian's 1939 visit to Armenia. Georgi Tigranov wrote that the concerto manifests Khachaturian's "organic connection" with Armenian folk music. In its incorporation of "much folk color", Kurt Masur likened it to Dvořák's concerto.

Specifically, the main theme of the first movement resembles melodies of the kochari dance and the song "Kele, Kele", while the secondary theme recalls the song "Es arun". The middle section of the second movement shows a stylistic affinity with the tragic songs "Krunk" and "Antuni". In the second movement Khachaturian also uses the ashugh's funeral song composed by himself for the 1938 film Zangezur. The conductor Sergey Smbatyan stated that while it was composed for a tragic movie about the Bolsheviks and nationalists, "the tragedy comes straight from the Armenian soul". The finale's principal theme echoes the folk song "Vard koshiks". Many of these folk songs were transcribed by Komitas.

Other critics have proposed similarities to George Gershwin and metal riffs.

== Popularity and legacy ==
The concerto is one of Khachaturian's most significant and better-known works. It is the second in a triptych of Khachaturian concertos along with those for piano (1936) and cello (1946). While the three are regarded as "something of a grand cycle", only the Violin Concerto has become part of the mainstream repertoire. Although some critics have noted that the concerto has not fully entered the core violin canon and remains on the periphery of the concert repertoire despite its audience appeal and strong recording history, others have described it as one of the major violin concertos of the twentieth century, emphasizing its rapid establishment and lasting artistic stature. Tobias Bröker listed it as part of the "standard 20th century violin concerto repertoire".

Ivan March found it to be Khachaturian's "finest work" (Note: Ivan March earlier called it "his best work alongside the original score for Gayaneh".) and Levon Hakobian called it Khachaturian's "masterpiece". The violinist Julia Fischer, who recorded it in 2004, described it as "one of the most exciting works to have emerged from the 20th century".

The piece received official recognition, earning Khachaturian his first Stalin (State) Prize (second-class) in 1941. The concerto was "an instant hit" and became "one of the most popular new works played in the Soviet Union". It also "proved to be exportable and remained in the international repertoire". Within a decade, it had "jumped into immediate popularity" internationally. A wartime premiere in London was "enthusiastically received" and had "a considerable vogue at the time". Oistrakh's recording became a top selling classical album in the U.S. in August 1948. Chris Pasles wrote that "audiences and Soviet officials loved it for its accessibility, Armenian-flavored sweet-and-sour melodies, Technicolor orchestration and rhythmic vitality."

After the death of Oistrakh, who championed it in performances at home and abroad, in 1974 and changing tastes, the piece "not so gradually dropped from sight". By the mid-1980s, with a decline in Khachaturian's reputation, it had "disappeared from the concert hall" and regarded as "unjustly neglected" by the turn of the century. By the 2000s, it was taken up by younger violinists, such as Gil Shaham, Julia Fischer, and Sergey Khachatryan. Fischer, who recorded it in 2004, noted that when she proposed playing it, she "usually encountered strong opposition from conductors and concert promoters alike". Shaham, who recorded in 2009, stated that "few conductors were interested in it or really knew it".

== Critical reception ==
Many critics have pointed to its technical difficulty, (Note: "technically ferocious", "fiendishly difficult", "demanding", "virtuosic") for which it is "beloved by aficionados of the instrument". Critics have highlighted its creative liberty, noting how it allows for "artist freedom of expression and interpretation". Kurt Masur called it "simple, reflective of ballet music" and as having a "melancholy, Eastern flavor and ornaments ... the smell of rose perfume". Roger Covell described it as an "attractive piece, not least in its Armenian infections, and has a particularly dizzy finale". Allan Kozinn called it "a tuneful showpiece". Andrew Farach-Colton suggested that it is "one of the flashiest of concertos" with a "boisterous finale". Geoffrey Norris called the piece "irrepressibly exuberant", "more sultry than sombre, more spry than shadowy".

Some critics have singled out the Andante, the slow second movement, as particularly admirable. (Note: Daniel Jaffé: "Perhaps the Concerto's heart is to be found in the twilight world of the central Andante sostenuto." Tully Potter: "It is a colorful score, exciting if not particularly profound in its outer movements. What makes a listener return to it is the lovely central slow movement, which gives a great violinist the chance to brood a little and show off his or her legato." Sarah Bryan Miller: "This is a wonderful piece of music, its marvelously melancholy central section framed by big, fast-paced movements." A reviewer in the Evening Independent argued that "only in the slow movement Andante sostenuto did the composer and the soloist have a chance to do what they both do best: sing".) Tim Ashley praised it as an "immensely attractive work" and added that the "swaying, hypnotic Andante is notably beautiful". Fiona Maddocks wrote that the Andante has an "almost mystical mood". Edward Greenfield went as far to argue that the "concerto has claims to be the composer's finest work, claims which the yearning tenderness of the slow movement [Andante] support." Ivan March praised the concerto as a "splendid" work with "some marvelous tunes". He singled out the "dreamy and languorous melodies" of the Andante, "full of Eastern promise", and the "unforgettable second subject of the first movement".

Carter Harman, an early American critic, found it "essentially shapeless" with "a lack of variety in the violin tone". Rob Cowan found it "tuneful, garish and musically banal". Robert Layton opined that Khachaturian's violin and piano concertos are "colourful pieces in the tradition of Russian orientalism and have no higher aim than to entertain, which they do effectively." In a similar vein, Richard Dyer wrote that while "not a piece of great musical consequence," it is "reasonably high in entertainment value".

Over the years, The Washington Post critic Joseph McLellan gave the concerto mixed and contradictory reviews, calling it "spectacular", "formidable", but also "rather deplorable". He argued that it is "only marginally worth playing at best" and is "less interesting" than Brahms's concerto. Other Washington Post critics Philip Kennicott and Tim Page are also dismissive. Kennicott called it "oppressively square-jawed music", while Page classified it "tub-thumping Soviet nationalism and pensive Armenian melodies, slightly stirred".

Michael Dervan found it "unduly repetitive". Several critics have criticized its length, with David Hurwitz calling it "long for its material". Andrew Clements found it "far too long for the quality of its musical ideas", with "featureless writing in the opening Allegro, unfocused cantilena with an oriental tang in the slow movement, noisy bravura in the finale".

Hans Keller was highly critical of the work, suggesting that the "continual repetitions" in the concerto are "absolutely unbearable (incomprehensible)". He wrote that "where the work is liked in the West, it's liked for its sound rather than its ideas, or, at the interpretative end, because it lies well on the solo instrument." Keller also found the concerto to be an example of over-symmetry, characteristic of Soviet socialist realism.

BBC Music Magazine's David Nice described it as "a shambling monster with a sackful of good tunes" and found the Khachaturian-Oistrakh collaboration a "very impressive piece of teamwork" which "deserves to be heard whether or not you can stand the piece itself". Los Angeles Times critic Chris Pasles found it only "fitfully interesting" with Khachaturian's elaborations of folkloric melody "simplistic" and his rhythmic concepts catchy, but "predictable, unchallenging and repetitive".

== Selected recordings ==
Below are some of the most significant and acclaimed recordings of the work.

Year	Soloist	Conductor	Orchestra	Label	Ref
1955	David Oistrakh	Khachaturian	Philharmonia Orchestra	Warner Classics	(Note: Marketed as "by far the most acclaimed version")
1958	Leonid Kogan	Pierre Monteux	Boston Symphony Orchestra	RCA	(Note: acclaimed as an "outstanding version" and "the finest" performance)
1959	Mischa Elman	Vladimir Golschmann	Vienna State Opera Orchestra	Vanguard Records	
1984	Itzhak Perlman	Zubin Mehta	Israel Philharmonic Orchestra	Warner Classics	(Note: acclaimed modern recording, won a nomination for the Grammy Award for Best Classical Performance – Instrumental Soloist or Soloists (with orchestra) in 1985.)
1990	Lydia Mordkovitch	Neeme Järvi	Royal Scottish National Orchestra	Chandos	
2003	Sergey Khachatryan	Emmanuel Krivine	Sinfonia Varsovia	Astrée Naïve	(Note: acclaimed modern recording & performer)
2004	Julia Fischer	Yakov Kreizberg	Russian National Orchestra	Pentatone	
2008	Nicolas Koeckert	José Serebrier	Royal Philharmonic Orchestra	Naxos	
2014	James Ehnes	Mark Wigglesworth	Melbourne Symphony Orchestra	Onyx Classics	(Note: widely reviewed)

== Flute adaptation ==
French flautist Jean-Pierre Rampal transcribed the concerto for the flute in 1968 with Khachaturian's suggestion and permission. It was published with Rampal's own cadenzas. He often performed it, and stated that the concerto had become "our equivalent of the Tchaikovsky violin concerto" for flautists. In his 1989 autobiography, Rampal described it as "one of the most popular of flute pieces, recorded and played by scores of flute soloists". Nancy Toff found Rampal's transcription, among others, to be second-rate because the flute cannot achieve the violin's bow power, double-stopping ability, and string tone qualities that the piece requires. Joseph McLellan described the concerto as "literally breathtaking for a flutist".

Irish flautist James Galway has offered his own transcription.

Notable recordings by flautists include:

Year	Flute soloist	Conductor	Orchestra	Label
1970	Jean-Pierre Rampal	Jean Martinon	Orchestre National de France	Erato
1984	James Galway	Myung-whun Chung	Royal Philharmonic Orchestra	RCA Red Seal
1992	Patrick Gallois	Ion Marin	Philharmonia Orchestra	Deutsche Grammophon
2002	Emmanuel Pahud	David Zinman	Tonhalle-Orchester Zürich	EMI Classics
2004	Wissam Boustany	Volodymyr Sirenko	National Symphony Orchestra of Ukraine	Nimbus Alliance
2010	Sharon Bezaly	Enrique Diemecke	São Paulo State Symphony Orchestra	BIS
