= Lankov =

Lankov (Russian: Ланько́в) is a Russian masculine surname, its feminine counterpart is Lankova. It may refer to the following notable people:

- Andrei Lankov (born 1963), Russian scholar of Asian studies
- Irina Lankova (born 1977), Russian-born Belgian concert pianist
