= Vadim Alexeevich Novikov =

Russian trumpeter

Vadim Alexeevich Novikov (Russian: Вадим Алексеевич Новиков; born 19 March 1941) is a Soviet and Russian trumpeter and educator. He is a Professor at the Tchaikovsky Moscow State Conservatory and a former soloist of the Bolshoi Theatre Orchestra. He holds the title of Meritorious Activist of the Arts of the Russian Federation.

== Early life and education ==
Novikov was born in Kolomna, Moscow Oblast. He studied at the Tchaikovsky Moscow State Conservatory from 1959 to 1964 under Sergei Yeryomin and Yuri Ussov. In 1962, while still a student, he won the gold medal at the World Festival of Youth and Students wind instrument competition in Helsinki.

== Career ==
=== Musician ===
From 1964 to 1986, Novikov served as a soloist with the Bolshoi Theatre Orchestra. In the words of conductor Gennady Rozhdestvensky, 'Vadim Novikov adorned the performances that I conducted'. He performed with the Moscow Chamber Orchestra under Rudolf Barshai, as well.

Novikov was the first Russian musician to record Baroque music on the trumpet, a concerto by Giuseppe Torelli, in 1959. He was also the first in Russia to perform on the piccolo trumpet in concert. This took place in January 1972 at the Tchaikovsky Concert Hall with organist Boris Romanov. Since the 1970s, Novikov has performed solo concerts in Russia, the UK, France, Germany, Austria, Switzerland, Spain, Italy and Estonia.

=== Teaching ===
Novikov began teaching at the Academic Music College of the Moscow Conservatory in 1964. From 1972 to 1974, he served as a teaching assistant to Timofey Dokshitzer at the Gnessin State Musical College, then returned to the Academic Music College, where he was offered to teach his own class and where he stayed until 2019.

He joined the faculty of the Moscow Conservatory in 1979, becoming a full Professor in 1986. Novikov has compiled three collections of music pieces for high-pitched trumpets and was the first instructor in Russia to formally include Baroque repertoire in the conservatory trumpet curriculum. He has held masterclasses at the Mozarteum University Salzburg, Guildhall School of Music and Drama (London) and the University of Birmingham.

In 1995, Novikov founded the Russian Interregional Guild of Trumpeters, a branch of the International Trumpet Guild (ITG), serving as its first president. He has organized international trumpet festivals and competitions under the Guild's auspices. In 2002, Novikov was awarded the title of Meritorious Activist of the Arts of the Russian Federation. In 2006, Kul'tura (Culture), a central Russian newspaper, published an interview with Novikov entitled Trumpet, a Fully-Fledged Solo Instrument. In 2011, another article in Kul'tura, dedicated to Professor Novikov's 70th birthday, was entitled Forward Looking, quoting the definition given to Novikov on the occasion of his jubilee by Edward Tarr, an American trumpeter and musicologist, who himself pioneered the revival of early trumpet music and whom Novikov met through the work at the Guild.

== See also ==
- Bolshoi Theatre
- Moscow Conservatory
