= Gnessin State Musical College =

Music school in Moscow, Russia

- Государственный музыкальный колледж имени Гнесиных
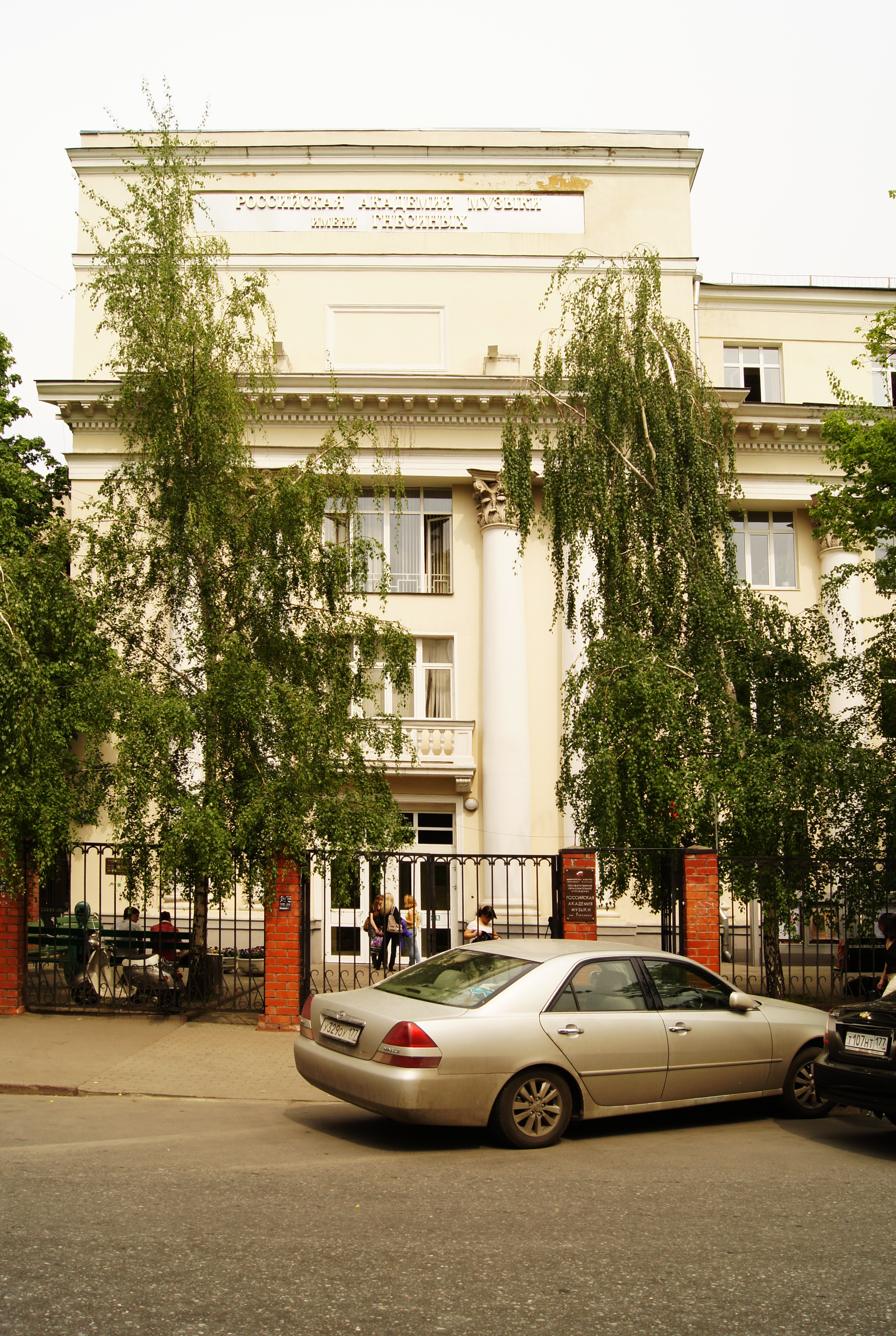
- The main building
- Location: Moscow; 55°45′19″N 37°35′32″E

The Gnessin State College of Music (Russian: Государственный музыкальный колледж имени Гнесиных, romanized: Gosudarstvennyy muzykal'nyy kolledzh imeni Gnesinykh) and Gnessin Russian Academy of Music (Russian: Российская академия музыки имени Гнесиных, romanized: Rossiyskaya akademiya muzyki imeni Gnesinykh) comprise a music school in Moscow.

== History ==
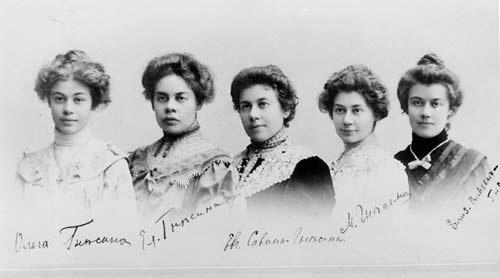
Gnessin sisters (Olga, Elena, Evgenia, Maria, Elizaveta)

Originally known as the Gnessin Institute, it was established on February 15, 1895, by three sisters: Evgenia Fabianovna, Elena Fabianovna, and Maria Fabianovna Gnessin. Each of the Gnessin sisters had studied piano and graduated with distinction from the Moscow Conservatory. Construction of the modern building began in 1937, interrupted during the war and resumed in 1943. The main part of the academy was built in 1946.

The college quickly became, and remains, an elite music school, considered second only to the Moscow Conservatory.

== Founders ==
The Gnessin sisters were born in Rostov-on-Don, the children of Rostov Rabbi Fabian Osipovich Gnessin. The entire family appears to have possessed musical talent. Their brother, Mikhail Fabianovich Gnessin, was a composer and teacher who later served (1945–1957) as head of Gnessin State Musical College.

== Alumni ==
Russian unless otherwise stated

- Georgy Andryushchenko, opera singer
- Alexey Arhipovsky, balalaika virtuoso
- Yulianna Avdeeva, pianist
- Rim Banna, Palestinian singer, composer and arranger
- Nikolay Baskov, singer
- Sonya Belousova, Russian-American composer, pianist and recording artist
- Dmitry Belosselskiy, bass
- Evgeny Belyaev, singer
- Boris Berezovsky, pianist
- Vasilisa Berzhanskaya, opera singer
- Dima Bilan, singer and Eurovision winner
- Artyom Bogucharsky, actor and clarinetist
- Ivan S. Bukreev, singer
- Roberto Cani, violinist
- Timofei Dokschitzer, trumpeter
- Larisa Dolina, singer and actress
- Marina Devyatova, singer
- Egine, Armenian-Russian singer and songwriter
- Boris Elkis, composer
- Ivan Farmakovsky, jazz pianist and composer
- Slava Gelfand, violinist
- Alexander Goldstein, composer
- Alina Ibragimova, violinist
- Dimitri Illarionov, guitarist
- Alexander Ivashkin, cellist
- Eugene Izotov, oboist
- Mungonzazal Janshindulam, Mongolian pianist
- Elena Kats-Chernin, composer
- Sati Kazanova, singer
- Yakov Kazyansky, composer and jazz pianist
- Aram Khachaturian, Armenian composer
- Leonid Kharitonov, singer
- Philipp Kirkorov, singer and actor
- Evgeny Kissin, pianist
- Lev Knipper, composer
- Alexander Knyazev, cellist
- Joseph Kobzon, Russian vocalist
- Rustam Komachkov, cellist
- Maria Krushevskaya, Russian harpist
- Elena Kuznetsova, pianist and teacher
- Edward M. Labkovsky, singer
- Irina Lankova, Belgian pianist
- Alexander Levine, Russian-British composer
- Konstantin Lifschitz, pianist
- Oleg Maisenberg, pianist
- Alexander Malofeev, pianist
- Maxim Mironov, tenor
- Roman Moiseyev, conductor
- Sofia Moshevich, Canadian scholar, pianist, and teacher
- Alexander Muravyov, pianist
- Quynh Nguyen, Vietnamese pianist
- Boris Parsadanian, Armenian-Estonian composer
- Olga Pashchenko, pianist
- Alla Pavlova, American composer
- Kirill Rodin, cellist
- Vadim L. Ruslanov, singer
- Alexei T. Sergeev, singer
- Prokhor Shalyapin, singer
- Konstantin Shamray, pianist
- Vissarion Shebalin, composer
- Natalia Sheludiakova, Russian-Australian pianist and teacher
- Anatoly Sheludyakov, pianist
- Dmitry Shishkin, pianist
- Vladimir Shkaptsov, singer
- Vladislav Shoot, composer
- Alexander S. Sibirtsev, singer
- Leonid Sigal, violinist
- Viktor Suslin, composer
- Evgeny Svetlanov, conductor
- Svoy, Russian-American songwriter/producer
- Mikael Tariverdiev, Georgian-Armenian composer
- Valentina Tolkunova, singer
- Daniil Trifonov, pianist
- Pava Turtygina, composer and pianist
- Julia Volkova, singer from the band t.A.T.u.
- Aleksey Volodin, pianist
- Marina Yakhlakova, pianist
- Inna Zhvanetskaya, Ukrainian composer
- Igor Zubkovsky, cellist
- Israel Borisovich Gusman, conductor

== Faculty ==
- Timofei Dokschitzer, Russian-Ukrainian trumpeter
- Mikhail Fikhtengoltz, violinist
- Grigori Gamburg, conductor
- Mikhail Gnessin, composer and brother of founding sisters
- Maria Grinberg, Russian-Ukrainian pianist
- Aram Khachaturian, Armenian composer
- Alexander Kobrin, pianist
- Volodymyr Kozhukhar, conductor
- Ivan Mozgovenko, clarinetist
- Nelli Shkolnikova, Russian-Australian violinist and teacher
- Natalia Shpiller, opera singer
- Lyubov Streicher, composer and violinist
- Inna Abramovna Zhvanetskaia, composer
- Valentine Yanovna Zhubinskaya, pianist and composer
