= Piano Concerto (Khachaturian) =

Concerto by Aram Khachaturian

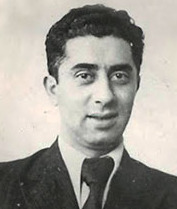
Aram Khachaturian in 1936

Aram Khachaturian's Piano Concerto in D♭ major, Op. 38, was composed in 1936. It was his first work to bring him recognition in the West, and it immediately entered the repertoire of many notable pianists.

The Piano Concerto was the first of three concertos Khachaturian wrote for the individual members of a renowned Soviet piano trio that performed together from 1941 until 1963. The others were the Violin Concerto for David Oistrakh (1940) and the Cello Concerto for Sviatoslav Knushevitsky (1946).

The Piano Concerto in D-flat was written for Lev Oborin, who premiered it in Moscow on 12 July 1937, with the Moscow Philharmonic under Lev Steinberg. The only piano available for the premiere was an upright piano, and the orchestra had just one rehearsal. The venue was an open-air stage in Sokolniki Park, and during the performance a strong wind blew Steinberg's glasses off, so that he could no longer see the score and had to conduct the remainder from memory. The British premiere was on 13 April 1940, at the Queen's Hall, London, with pianist Moura Lympany (who was approached after Clifford Curzon had declined), conducted by Alan Bush. It received its American debut on 14 March 1942, by Maro Ajemian at the Juilliard School in New York, conducted by Albert Stoessel.

== Structure and scoring ==
Opening theme of the 1st movement

The piece is in three movements:

1. Allegro ma non troppo e maestoso
2. Andante con anima
3. Allegro brillante

The first movement, Allegro ma non troppo e maestoso, makes extensive use of the three-note theme of F, B, and A♭, illustrated above.

Although the term "flexatone" is used, the second movement, Andante con anima, is one of the few classical pieces to make use of a musical saw, although this instrument is often omitted in performances and recordings of the concerto.

The third movement, Allegro brillante, caps the piece in an exciting manner.

The work is scored for 2 flutes, 2 oboes, 2 clarinets, bass clarinet, 2 bassoons, 4 horns, two trumpets, three trombones, tuba, timpani, percussion, and strings.

== Recordings ==
The concerto was first recorded in 1945, by Moura Lympany with the London Symphony Orchestra under Anatole Fistoulari. It was recorded the following year by William Kapell with the Boston Symphony Orchestra under Serge Koussevitzky. The Kapell recording became a jukebox favourite, and Kapell was so associated with the work that he was often called "Khachaturian Kapell". Lympany and Fistoulari recorded the work again in the mid 1950s. Since then it has been recorded by, among others, Lev Oborin, Oscar Levant, Peter Katin, Boris Berezovsky, Mindru Katz, Dora Serviarian Kuhn, Constantine Orbelian, Alicia de Larrocha, Leonard Pennario, Lorin Hollander, Gintaras Januševičius, Iyad Sughayer, Alberto Portugheis, Ingrid Sala Santamaria and Jean-Yves Thibaudet.
