= Yakov Kazyansky =

Russian pianist and composer

Yakov Kazyansky

Yakov Lazarevich Kazyansky (Russian: Яков Лазаревич Казьянский; 30 August 1948, Kuybyshev USSR) is a Russian pianist and composer. In 1994 he was awarded the title of Honoured Worker of Culture of the Russian Federation.

== Biography ==
Yakov Kazyansky was born on 30 August 1948 in Kuybyshev, USSR (today Samara, Russia), but grew up in Yaroslavl, where his family settled when he was 8 months old. He graduated from the L. V. Sobinov Yaroslavl Music School in 1967 with a degree in musical theory, and further gained a degree in musicology from the Gnessin Moscow State Musical-Pedagogical Institute in 1972.

He taught musical theory at his alma mater in Yaroslavl from 1972 to 1985, when he moved to the position of director of the musical section of the Yaroslavl Theatre for Young Spectators, working as a compositor at the same time. In 1987 he adapted Andrew Lloyd Webber's Jesus Christ Superstar for the Soviet stage, with the first performance of the musical in the USSR taking place in Rybinsk in December 1989, followed by performances at the Young Spectators' Theatre in Yaroslavl. From 2000 he also held the position of musical director at the Yaroslavl Puppet Theatre.

Works with his music have been staged in several cities in Russia. On top of these stage activities he has also adapted Jewish traditional songs and, as a jazz pianist, he has performed at several festivals. In 2021 he performed at the 10th edition of the Prostokvashino Rally, a Russian-language festival in the USA.

== Family ==
Kazyansky has two daughters, who live in the United States with their husbands. In a 2007 interview Kazyansky stated that he nevertheless preferred to remain in Russia.

== Awards ==
- F. G. Volkov prize, for the music for the spectacle "Evening of Russian vaudevilles" (1994)
- Honoured Worker of Culture of the Russian Federation (1994)
- L. B. Sobinov prize, for his opera (based on a work by Samuil Marshak) "The Cat's House" (1995)

== Audio samples ==
- Ballad from the television movie New Year’s Adventures
- Composition Monkey from the television movie New Year’s Adventures
- Dedicated to Billy Taylor jazz composition by Ya.Kazyansky (piano part – Ya.Kazyansky)
