= Timofei Dokschitzer =

Ukrainian musician (1921–2005)

Timofei Aleksandrovich Dokschitzer
- Тимофей Александрович Докшицер
- Born: Tevel Shevelevich Dokschitzer; December 13, 1921; Nizhyn, Ukrainian SSR, Soviet Union (present-day Ukraine)
- Died: March 16, 2005 (aged 83); Vilnius, Lithuania
- Occupations: Trumpeter, music professor

Timofei Aleksandrovich Dokschitzer (Note: Russian: Тимофей Александрович Докшицер, romanized: Timofey Aleksandrovich Dokshitser) (13 December 1921 — 16 March 2005, born Tevel Shevelevich Dokschitzer) (Note: Russian: Тевель Шевелевич Докшицер, romanized: Tevel Shevelevich Dokshitser) was a Soviet Russian trumpeter, and a professor in Gnesins Musical College. He was the solo trumpeter of the Bolshoi Theater.

Dokschitzer was born in Nizhyn, Ukraine. He started to play when he was 10 years old. He finished the Central Musical School and Gnesins Musical College. In 1947 he won the International Competition in Prague. In 1957 he finished the Moscow State Conservatory. He became one of the outstanding trumpeters of the world, who proved that trumpet can be a solo instrument, as the violin or piano.

He played both classical musical compositions and modern concertos by Alexander Arutiunian, Alexandra Pakhmutova and others. Some of his records were re-issued on CD.

His distinctive style and sound was born out of a love of opera, and that operatic influence remained a permanent element of his playing.

At the International Trumpet Days Bremen, Germany he gave each year masterclasses from 1992 - 1999 and was professor at the International Trumpet Academy Bremen, Germany from 1994 - 1999 together with international trumpeters like Pierre Thibaud (France), Bo Nilsson (Sweden), Otto Sauter (Germany). He died in Vilnius, Lithuania.
