= Quynh Nguyen =

- Origin: Hanoi, Vietnam
- Genres: Classical
- Instrument: Piano
- Years active: 1987–present
- Website: www.quynhpiano.com

Quynh Nguyen (Vietnamese: Nguyễn Thuý Quỳnh), (pronounced Quin Nwin) is a Vietnamese-American classical pianist and educator based in New York City. Born in Hanoi, she studied at the Hanoi Conservatory of Music, the Gnessin State Musical College in Moscow, the Juilliard School, Mannes College of Music, and the Graduate Center of the City University of New York, where she received the Doctor of Musical Arts degree.

Nguyen has appeared as a soloist and recitalist in the United States, Europe, and Asia, including performances at Carnegie Hall, Lincoln Center, the Smithsonian Institution, the Berlin Konzerthaus, and the Hanoi Opera House. She has performed with orchestras including the Vietnam National Symphony Orchestra, the London Symphony Orchestra, the Seattle Symphony, and the Springfield Symphony Orchestra.

Her recordings include solo albums on Arabesque Records, The Flower of France: Germaine Tailleferre, Works for Piano on Music & Arts, and Paul Chihara: Complete Piano Works on Naxos American Classics. The Chihara recording includes Concerto-Fantasy, composed in close collaboration with Nguyen and recorded with the London Symphony Orchestra under conductor Stephen Barlow. Her Tailleferre album received attention for bringing together solo piano works, transcriptions, and excerpts from ballet and film scores by Germaine Tailleferre.

Nguyen has been associated with the music of Mozart, Chopin, Olivier Messiaen, Paul Chihara, and Germaine Tailleferre. She received a Fulbright Fellowship to France for research on Messiaen and Eastern influences in his music. As part of her fellowship, she studied with Yvonne Loriod Messiaen, (muse and second wife of Olivier Messiaen and professor emeritus at the Paris Conservatory). She serves on the music faculty of Hunter College, City University of New York, and is affiliated with the International Keyboard Institute and Festival in New York. In 2025, Nguyen served as President of the Jury for the U.S. Debut Scholarship auditions held at the Conservatoire national supérieur de musique et de danse de Paris.

== Performances and critical acclaim ==
She made her New York debut in 2001, and, according to The New York Times, "received high praise from reliable quarters for her New York debut recital". American piano critic Harris Goldsmith reviewed her performance of Chopin in favorable terms, comparing her to pianists such as Ignaz Friedman, Murray Perahia, and Arthur Rubinstein. Richard Dyer of The Boston Globe, reviewing a 2003 performance, wrote, "She is often sensitive and poetic, and when she should dazzle with lively rhythm, piquant inflexions, and dashing virtuosity... she knows how to." Quynh Nguyen was selected as one of the "19 young stars of tomorrow" by Musical America in 2004.

Quynh has performed extensively throughout the United States, Europe, and Asia, in notable venues such as the Weill Recital Hall at Carnegie Hall, Avery Fisher Hall, Lincoln Center, New York; McEvoy Auditorium and the Freer Gallery at the Smithsonian in Washington D.C.; the Berlin Konzerthaus in Berlin, Germany; the Grand Opera House in Hanoi, Vietnam, among many others. She participated and performed at various international music festivals, such as the Verbier Festival, Switzerland; the American Conservatory in Fontainebleau, France; the Mozarteum in Austria, the Bowdoin International Music Festival, Rockport Music Festival, and the International Keyboard Institute and Festival. A prizewinner in various national and international piano competitions, she has been featured on numerous radio stations throughout the United States. Her performance of Beethoven's "Moonlight" Sonata No. 14 in C-sharp minor was featured on Wayne Picciano's "Grand Piano" series, which was broadcast on television in multiple states across the country. She was interviewed and featured on Japanese Television Fujisankei as well as Vietnamese national television. In February 2013, her interview and performances at the Smithsonian American Art Museum and at Hunter College were broadcast on CUNY TV channel 75, in a program titled "Study With the Best."

In January 2024, Nguyen performed as featured soloist with the Seattle Symphony Orchestra and conductor Sunny Xia in Paul Chihara's Piano Concerto-Fantasy at Benaroya Hall, as part of the orchestra's "Celebrate Asia" concert.

In March 2024, she performed two concerti with the Springfield Symphony Orchestra—Chihara's Piano Concerto-Fantasy and Beethoven's Choral Fantasy—in a single concert that was also filmed by NHK Japanese Television.

In October 2022, Nguyen gave the world premiere of Paul Chihara's Concerto-Fantasy for Piano and Orchestra with the Vietnam National Symphony Orchestra under conductor Honna Tetsuji at the Hanoi Opera House, in a concert commemorating the normalization of US–Vietnam diplomatic relations.

In April 2023, Nguyen performed at the Fulbright Prize Ceremony in Washington, D.C., alongside soprano Renée Fleming and poet Alyssa Pierce. The ceremony honored Dr. Anthony Fauci and Dr. Kizzmekia Corbett with the Fulbright Prize for International Understanding.

In November 2025, Nguyen served as President of the Jury for the French American Piano Society's U.S. Debut Scholarship auditions at the Conservatoire national supérieur de musique et de danse de Paris.

== Background ==
She started piano at age four with her uncle, and was nine years old when she gave her first recital. She first studied at the Hanoi Conservatory, and made her orchestral debut at age 11; she went on to receive a scholarship at Moscow's Gnessin State Musical College (where she studied with pianist Oleg Musorin), and continued her studies at the Juilliard School, Mannes College of Music, and CUNY Graduate Center.

She received her Doctor of Musical Arts degree from the Graduate Center of City University of New York in 2009. Her teachers include Bella Davidovich, Jerome Rose, Jacob Lateiner, Martin Canin and Yvonne Loriod. She has participated in master classes of such artists as Tatiana Nikolaeva, Richard Goode, Jeffrey Swann, Peter Frankl, and András Schiff. She received a Fulbright Scholarship during 2004–2005 to study in France for a project entitled "Messiaen and the Eastern Influence on his Music". Her dissertation titled An Analysis of Olivier Messiaen's Last Piano Solo Work: Petites esquisses d'oiseaux received the Barry Brook Dissertation Award from the CUNY Graduate Center. Additionally, she is the recipient of several awards and fellowships, including the Fulbright Fellowship, the American Prize (Lorin Hollander Award), and the United States Presidential Academic Excellence Award.

== Teaching ==
Nguyen currently serves on the piano faculty of the International Keyboard Institute and Festival in New York City and at Hunter College, City University of New York, where she teaches private piano instruction and conducts piano and chamber music master classes. She also serves as New York Executive Director of the French American Piano Society.

== Discography ==
- 2023: Paul Chihara: Complete Piano Works – Naxos American Classics
- 2023: The Flower of France: Germaine Tailleferre, Works for Piano – Music & Arts (MA-1306)
- 2013: Quynh Nguyen In Recital, Live in New York – Arabesque Records (Works by Beethoven, Messiaen, Chopin)
- 2004 (reissued 2012): Quynh Nguyen plays Schubert & Chopin – Arabesque Records (Works by Schubert, Chopin)
- 2002: Quynh Nguyen, piano – Arabesque Records (Works by Bach, Beethoven, Chopin, Ravel)

The Naxos recording features the Concerto-Fantasy for Piano and Orchestra with the London Symphony Orchestra conducted by conductor Stephen Barlow, alongside Bagatelles (Twice Seven Haiku for Piano), Four Reveries on Beethoven, and Ami for piano four hands. Gramophone praised the album, noting that Nguyen's understanding of Chihara's piano writing is "consistent and innate" and that her touch is "in every sense pitch perfect." Fanfare magazine called the recording "superb" and described Nguyen's performance as convincing listeners "she was born to play this music." AllMusic described the release as "ingenious and richly evocative and beautifully played...a wonderful release."

The Tailleferre album on Music & Arts was awarded the Gold Medal by Global Music Awards. Fanfare gave it five stars, calling it "alluring music by a wonderful composer performed by a wonderful artist." BBC Music Magazine noted that Nguyen "has produced a valuable document of Germaine Tailleferre's piano works." American Record Guide called it "a treasurable body of music, lovingly and effectively played" and gave it an unreserved recommendation.
