= Stefan Popov (musician) =

Stefan Popov (born 3 April 1940) is an internationally recognised Bulgarian cellist. He started playing the cello at the age of 12 and, having won a scholarship, continued his training at the Moscow Conservatory where he studied under Sviatoslav Knushevitsky and Mstislav Rostropovich from 1961 to 1966. He became a prize-winner in many music competitions, including Geneva, Florence and Vienna. In 1966, as a finalist he won a medal in the International Tchaikovsky Competition for cello. Around the same time as the Tchaikovsky competition, he was also awarded a prize from the Union of Soviet Composers for his performance of Russian music.

From 1971 to 1975 he taught at the Boston University and he was the head of the cello department of the New England Conservatory. From 1977 to date, he lives in the United Kingdom, where he is a professor of cello at the Guildhall School of Music and Drama in London. He performs regularly and leads numerous cello masterclasses privately, as well as at music festivals and in state conservatoires throughout the world.

He has had performances broadcast on radio and television, as well as having recorded numerous CDs. In 2006, he recorded and transcribed Beethoven's violin concerto for cello, to coincide with the 200 year anniversary of its first performance. He stated that he did this also in part "to compensate for the fact that no Beethoven cello concerto was ever written" and to commemorate what is generally regarded as one of the greatest concertos for any instrument.

In 2008 he was awarded the "Chevalier du violoncelle" title at the Eva Janzer Memorial Cello Center for his contribution to the cause of cello playing.
