= Cello Concerto (Myaskovsky) =

Nikolai Myaskovsky composed his Cello Concerto in C minor, Op. 66, during the years 1944–45. It ranks among the few works of the composer that are found frequently in concert or on recordings.

The concerto was written for Sviatoslav Knushevitsky, one of Myaskovsky's great champions, who premiered it in Moscow on 17 March 1945. The first recording, however, was made by Mstislav Rostropovich in 1956.

== Structure ==
The concerto is in two movements:

1. Lento ma non troppo – Andante – Tempo I
2. Allegro vivace – Più marcato – Meno mosso – Tempo I

The total duration of the concerto amounts to about 25 minutes. The piece is among the late works of the composer, and among its melodies appear Russian folk songs. Myaskovsky faced a lot of pressure from the Soviet government, more so than many other composers of his time. The Bolshevik Party viewed him as someone connected to the old Russian regime who did not fully fit into the new Soviet society. His music was sometimes suppressed, and the authorities also criticized his approach to teaching composition. Despite this, other musicians in Moscow respected him greatly and saw him as an important musical figure. However, in the Communist Party’s 1948 resolution, Myaskovsky was publicly attacked and criticized, even though he was already seriously ill with cancer and died only two years later.

Tassie, Gregor. Nikolay Myaskovsky: the conscience of Russian music. Bloomsbury Publishing PLC, 2014.
