= Rodion Azarkhin =

Russian musician

Rodion Mikhaylovich Azarkhin (Russian: Родио́н Миха́йлович Аза́рхин) also spelt Rodion Azarkin and Radion Azarkin, (22 March 1931, Kharkiv, USSR – 26 March 2007, Moscow, Russia) was a Russian musician. He started playing the double bass in 1945 at a music school next to the Saint Petersburg Conservatory. Later he was a pupil of RSFSR Honoured Artist M.M. Kurbatov at the Leningrad Conservatory from which he graduated with honours in 1954. He continued his studies as a postgraduate student at the Moscow Conservatory under cellist Sviatoslav Knushevitsky.

Azarkhin worked with many musical ensembles, including the Moscow Chamber Orchestra under Rudolf Barshai, Leningrad Radio Variety Orchestra, Leningrad Philharmonic Orchestra, Leningrad Academic Maliy Opera Theatre Orchestra, State Academic Symphony Orchestra of the Russian Federation, Izmir State Symphony Orchestra and as a soloist with the Turkish conductor Ender Sakpinar. He also participated as a soloist in the programme of The Royal Conservatory of Music concert called Music in Exile.

Azarkhin's repertoire of more than 200 works is unique. It features numerous arrangements of his own and transcriptions of instrumental pieces, as well as rarely performed original compositions for double bass. These include: concertos by Bach, Boccherini, Dittersdorf, Dvořák, Haendel, Haydn, Saint-Saëns, Schumann, Tubin; "Variations on a Rococo theme" by Tchaikovsky, Partita No.2 by Bach (with Chaconne); and sonatas by Beethoven ("Kreutzer-Sonate"), Boccherini, Brahms, Franck, Grieg, Hindemith, Kabalevsky, Rachmaninov, Schubert, and "Moses" by Paganini, and "Introduction and rondo-capriccio" by Saint-Saëns.

Performance of these works, use of new performing techniques, and new timbre colours allowed Azarkhin to extend considerably the conventional idea about the artistic potential of the double bass as a solo instrument.

== Sources ==
- Российский гуманитарный энциклопедический словарь. Entry on Rodion Azarkhin. «Гуманитарный издательский центр ВЛАДОС», 2002. (in Russian)
