= Rustam Komachkov =

Russian cellist

- Рустам Комачков
- Born: January 27, 1969
- Education: Gnessin State Musical College
- Alma mater: Moscow Conservatory
- Occupation: Cellist

Rustam Komachkov (Russian: Рустам Комачков; born January 27, 1969) is a Russian cellist.

== Biography ==
Komachkov was born into a musical family and attended both Gnessin State Musical College and Moscow Conservatory, from which he graduated. Later on he practiced cello music with Alexander Melnikov and Alexander Kniazev and Valentin Feigin. He won two first prizes, at the All-Russia Chamber Music Competition in Ryazan, Russia and International Music Competition Caltanissetta Province in Italy. Following that, he won second prize at the All-Russia Cello Competition in Voronezh and then got the same awards at the Viotti International Music Competition and Trapani International Chamber Music Competition.

He also known for his appearances on various TV channels such as the Radio Music Channel of Estonia and First Channel of Buenos-Aires in Argentina. He has performed works of German composers such as Bach, Beethoven, Brahms, Schubert, Russian ones such as Tchaikovsky, Shostakovich and Sviridov, and the Argentinian Piazzolla. His Russian performances include ones with the Bolshoi Theatre Orchestra, Novosibirsk Philharmonic, Voronezh Symphony Orchestra, Maly Theatre and the Moscow Chamber Orchestra as well as the Moscow House of Music. Besides national appearances he has also performed in France, Germany, the Netherlands, Italy, South Korea, and former Yugoslavia.
