= Alexander Knyazev =

Russian chemist (born 1976)

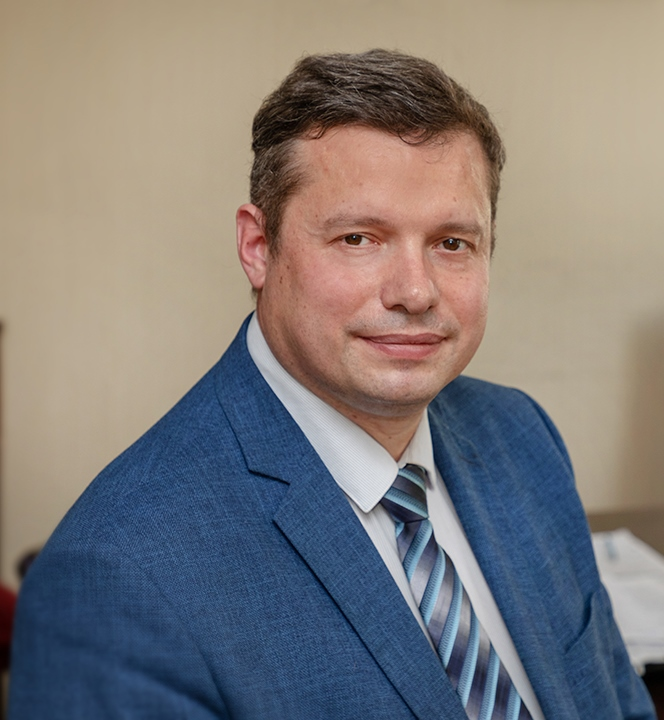
- Born: Knyazev Alexander; 19 July 1976 (age 50); Nizhny Novgorod
- Education: Lobachevsky University
- Scientific career
- Fields: Chemistry

Alexander Knyazev (born 19 July 1976) is a Russian crystal chemist and physical chemist, Professor of the Lobachevsky University, Dean of the Chemical Faculty. Head of the Department of Medicinal Chemistry, Head of the postgraduate research school "New materials based on inorganic compounds." He graduated from the Faculty of Chemistry, Lobachevsky University (1998) and PhD (2000), Doctor of Chemistry (2009), academic rank of professor (2011).

== Biography ==
Author of more than 280 articles in national and international academic journals, three chapters in books and three textbooks. H-index 18 (Web of Science). Deputy Chairman of the Conference RCCT-2015. 12 post-graduate students defended their Ph.D. theses.

== Research interests ==
- Crystal chemistry
- Chemical thermodynamics Inorganic and organic compounds
- Radiochemistry

== Membership in leading scientific communities ==
- Chief editor of the journal "Applied Solid State Chemistry"

== Chapters in books ==
1. Thorium: Chemical Properties, Uses and Environmental Effects. Chapter: Knyazev A.V., Manyakina M.E. Thermophysical and Thermodynamic Properties of Oxygen-containing Compounds of Thorium. New York. Nova Science Publishers. 2014.
2. Apatite: Synthesis, Structural Characterization and Biomedical Applications. Chapter: Bulanov Е.N., Knyazev A.V. High-temperature in situ XRD Investigations of Apatites. Structural Interpretation of Thermal Deformations. New York. Nova Science Publishers. 2014.
3. Uranium: Sources, Exposure and Environmental Effects. Chapter: Knyazev A.V., Manyakina M.E. Thermodynamic properties of uranium minerals. New York. Nova Science Publishers. 2015.
4. A Closer Look at Hormones. Editor: Knyazev Alexander. New York. Nova Science Publishers. 2020.

== Main publications ==
1. Bulanov E.N., Wang J., Knyazev A.V., White T., Manyakina M.E., Baikie T., Lapshin A.N., Dong Z. Structure and thermal expansion of calcium-thorium apatite. // Inorganic Chemistry. 2015. V.54. Р. 11356-11361.
2. Knyazev A.V., Letyanina I.A., Plesovskikh A.S., Smirnova N.N., Knyazeva S.S. Thermodynamic properties of vitamin B2. // Thermochimica Acta. 2014. V.575. P.12-16.
3. Knyazev A.V., Smirnova N.N., Plesovskikh A.S., Shushunov A.N., Knyazeva S.S. Low-temperature heat capacity and thermodynamic functions of vitamin B12. // Thermochimica Acta. 2014. V.582. P.35-39.
4. Knyazev A.V., Smirnova N.N., Mączka M., Hermanowicz K., Knyazeva S.S., Letyanina I.A., Lelet M.I. Thermodynamic and spectroscopic properties of Co7/3Sb2/3O4. // Journal of Chemical Thermodynamics. 2014. V. 74. P. 201—208.
5. Knyazev A.V., Smirnova N.N., Manyakina M.E., Shushunov A.N. Low-temperature heat capacity and thermodynamic functions of KTh_{2}(PO_{4})_{3}. // Thermochimica Acta. 2014. V.584. P.67-71.
6. Knyazev A.V., Chernorukov N.G., Letyanina I.A., Zakharova Yu. A., Ladenkov I.V. Crystal structure and thermodynamic properties of dipotassium diiron(III) hexatitanium oxide. // Journal of Thermal Analysis and Calorimetry. 2013. V.112. P.991-996.
7. Bissengaliyeva M.R., Knyazev A.V., Bekturganov N.S., Gogol D.B., Taimassova Sh.T., Smolenkov Yu.Y., Tashuta G.N. Crystal structure and thermodynamic properties of barium-thulium bismuthate with perovskite structure. // Journal of the American Ceramic Society. 2013. V.96. Issue 6. P.1883-1890.
8. Knyazev A.V., Smirnova N.N., Mączka M., Knyazeva S.S., Letyanina I.A. Thermodynamic and spectroscopic properties of spinel with the formula Li_{4}/3Ti_{5}/3O_{4}. // Thermochimica Acta. 2013. V.559. P.40-45.
9. Salomatina E.V., Bit’urin N.M., Gulenova M.V., Gracheva T.A., Drozdov M.N., Knyazev A.V., Kir’yanov K.V., Markin A.V., Smirnova L.A. Synthesis, structure, and properties of organic-inorganic (co)polymers containing poly(titanium oxide). // Journal of Materials Chemistry C. 2013. V. 1. P. 6375 — 6385.
10. Knyazev A.V., Mączka M., Ladenkov I.V., Bulanov E.N., Ptak M. Crystal structure, spectroscopy, and thermal expansion of compounds in MI_{2}O-Al_{2}O_{3}-TiO_{2} system. // Journal of Solid State Chemistry. 2012. V. 196. P.110-118.
11. Mączka M., Knyazev A.V., Majchrowski A., Hanuza J., Kojima S. Temperature-dependent Raman scattering study of defect pyrochlores RbNbWO_{6} and CsTaWO_{6}. // Journal of Physics: Condensed Matter. 2012. V.24. 195902. P.1-10.
12. Knyazev A.V., Chernorukov N.G., Bulanov E.N. Apatite-structured Compounds: Synthesis and High-temperature Investigation. // Materials Chemistry and Physics. 2012. V. 132. Issues 2-3. P.773-781.
13. Knyazev A.V., Kuznetsova N.Yu., Chernorukov N.G., Tananaev I.G. Physicochemical investigation and thermodynamics of oxides compounds of uranium and phase for immobilization of radionuclides. // Thermochimica Acta. 2012. V.532. P.127-133.
14. Knyazev A.V., Mączka M., Bulanov E.N., Ptak M., Belopolskaya S.S. High-temperature thermal and X-ray diffraction studies, and room-temperature spectroscopic investigation of some inorganic pigments. // Dyes and Pigments. 2011. V.91. P.286-293.
15. Mączka M., Knyazev A.V., Kuznetsova N.Yu., Ptak M., Macalik L. Raman and IR studies of TaWO5.5, ASbWO6 (A = K, Rb, Cs, Tl) and ASbWO6•H_{2}O (A = H, NH4, Li, Na) pyrochlore oxides. // Journal of Raman Spectroscopy. 2011. V.42. P.529-533.
