= Roberto Cani =

Italian violinist (1967–2025)

- Cani, in the 1980s
- Born: Roberto Salvatore Cani; 17 October 1967; Milan, Italy
- Died: 9 April 2025 (aged 57); Los Angeles, California, U.S.
- Occupations: Classical violinist; Concertmaster
- Organizations: Los Angeles Opera Orchestra; New Hollywood String Quartet
- Website: robertocani.net

Roberto Salvatore Cani (17 October 1967 – 9 April 2025) was an Italian classical violinist based in Los Angeles, where he was concertmaster of the Los Angeles Opera Orchestra from 2011. He gave concerts as a soloist and a chamber musician in Europe, the United States, Canada, Asia and South Africa.

== Early life and education ==
Roberto Cani was born on 17 October 1967 in Milan, to parents of Sicilian descent. Cani began taking violin lessons at the age of seven. He attended the Milan Conservatory, where he was awarded the Minetti Prize in 1986. He studied further at the Gnessin State Musical College in Moscow, and the Thornton School of Music of the University of Southern California in Los Angeles. He studied with Zinaida Gilels, Miroslav Roussine, Alice Schoenfeld, Abrahm Shtern, Viktor Tretiakov and Pavel Vernikov.

== Career ==
Cani made his debut at the Salle Gaveau in Paris conducted by Daniele Gatti on 16 January 1987. He received a prize at the 1990 Paganini Competition in Genova, at Jeunesses Musicales in Belgrade in 1991, and at the Courcillon International Competitions the same year. He was also honoured at the 1994 Tchaikovsky International Competition in Moscow. He played concerts in Italy, Russia, Poland, Croatia, Germany, Austria, Belgium, France, Serbia, Spain, the United States, Japan, Taiwan, and South Africa. He performed as a guest concert master with the La Scala Orchestra conducted by Riccardo Muti, He played with the American Youth Symphony, the Belgrade Philharmonic Orchestra, the Missouri Chamber Orchestra, the Moscow Symphony Orchestra, the Oregon Symphony, the RAI National Symphony Orchestra, the Symphony of the Americas and the Zagreb Soloists. He performed with the Haydn Orchestra of Bolzano, the Volgograd Symphony Orchestra, the Orchestra Cantelli and the Italian Consort. He played in venues such as Royce Hall in Los Angeles, Bolshoi Hall and Tchaikovsky Hall in Moscow, the Lisinski Hall in Belgrade, at St George's Church, Brandon Hill in Bristol, and Tokyo's Suntory Hall.

As a chamber musician, Cani collaborated with partners such as pianists Justus Frantz and Jeffrey Swann, cellist Lynn Harrell, and guitarist Jason Vieaux. He played the premiere of Henryk Górecki's Kleine Phantasie for violin and piano with Swann in 1997. He was first violinist of the New Hollywood String Quartet and formed the Hollywood Piano Trio with pianist Inna Faliks and cellist Robert deMaine. He played at chamber music festivals at the West Coast of the United States, and in Berlin, Hamburg, Vienna, and the Canary Islands. Cani performed on a 1735 Giuseppe Guarneri del Gesù ex Baron Knoop.

Cani served as concertmaster of the Los Angeles Opera Orchestra from 2011 until his death. He was on the faculty of California State University, Northridge. He was also a skilled violin maker, especially of bows.

== Personal life and death ==
Cani had an older sister, Silvana, and a younger sister, Sandra. He and his wife, Elena, had a daughter, Sofia, and resided in Los Angeles. He lived with pancreatic cancer for the final two years of his life, but he continued to perform.

Cani died from cancer in Los Angeles, on 9 April 2025. at the age of 57.

== Recordings ==
Cani recorded for Agora and Arkadia labels:

- Sonatas for Solo Violin: Bartok, Ysaye, Prokofiev, Bloch, Agora (1996)
- Busoni and Respighi Sonatas with pianist Jeffrey Swann, Arkadia (1993)
- Vivaldi: The Four Seasons
- Tchaikovsky: Violin Concerto
