= Natalia Shpiller =

Russian opera singer and music educator

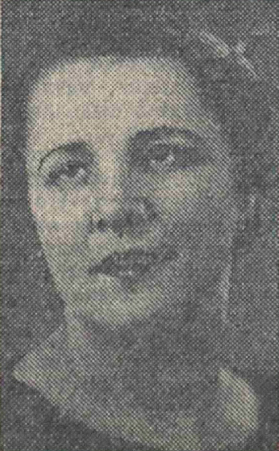
- Born: 7 September 1909; Kyiv, Russian Empire
- Died: 20 July 1995 (aged 85); Moscow, Russia
- Education: Kyiv Conservatory
- Occupation: Opera singer
- Spouse: Sviatoslav Knushevitsky
- Awards: Lenin Prize; Stalin Prize

Natalia Dmitrevna Shpiller, sometimes spelled Natalia Spiller, Natalya Shpiller, Natalʹja Špiller, or Natalʹia Shpiller, (Russian: Ната́лья Дми́триевна Шпи́ллер, Ukrainian: Ната́лія Дми́трівна Шпі́ллер; 7 September 1909 – 20 July 1995) was a Soviet lyric soprano of Czech ethnicity who was a leading opera singer at the Bolshoi Theatre in Moscow from the 1930s through the 1950s. Beloved by Joseph Stalin, she was frequently used by him for performances at the Moscow Kremlin to impress visiting dignitaries. A People's Artist of Russia, a Lenin Prize recipient, and the winner of multiple Stalin Prizes, she was a voice teacher on the faculty of the Gnessin State Musical College from 1950 through 1995. Two Stalin Prizes first degree (1943, 1950). Stalin Prize second degree (1941).

== Life and career ==
Born in Kyiv, Russian Empire, Shpiller was trained at the Kyiv Conservatory, where she was a pupil of AP Schperling. She made her professional debut at the Samara State Academic Opera and Ballet Theatre in Kuybyshev Square in Samara, Russia in 1931, remaining there as a resident artist through 1934. In 1935 she became a resident artist at the Bolshoi Theater in Moscow, remaining a principal artist at that theatre through 1958. She continued to occasionally perform at the Bolshoi as a guest artist into the 1960s. Her repertoire at that opera house included Antonida in Mikhail Glinka's A Life for the Tsar, Countess Almaviva in Mozart's The Marriage of Figaro, Marguerite in Charles Gounod's Faust, Marfa in Nikolai Rimsky-Korsakov's The Tsar's Bride, Mathilde in Gioachino Rossini's William Tell, Micaela in Carmen, Tatiana in Pyotr Ilyich Tchaikovsky's Eugen Onegin, Volkhova in Rimsky-Korsakov's Sadko, Tsarevna Swan-Bird in Rimsky-Korsakov's The Tale of Tsar Saltan, and the title roles in Giacomo Puccini's Madama Butterfly and Tchaikovsky's Iolanta.

Russian dictator Joseph Stalin loved Shpiller's singing voice, and frequently requested her to perform at banquets held at the Moscow Kremlin for foreign diplomats. In 1940 she performed the role of Sieglinde in a concert version of Richard Wagner's Die Walküre at the Kremlin for a gala held in honor of visiting German Foreign Minister Joachim von Ribbentrop, an event through which Stalin hoped to cement friendship between Russia and Nazi Germany. In 1941 she was one of the first recipients of the USSR State Prize. She was awarded the Stalin Prize in 1943 and 1950. In 1947 she was named a People's Artist of Russia, and in 1951 she was awarded the Lenin Prize. She was also granted permission to travel abroad four times during her career, a rare opportunity for Russian artists of that era.

For forty-five years she taught on the singing faculty at the Gnessin State Musical College. She began her career there as a lecturer in 1950 and was made a full professor in 1963. During her tenure she was head of the college's department of opera training from 1964 through 1975, and then head of the voice faculty from 1975 through 1979. She continued to teach on the singing faculty up until her death in 1995.

She died in Moscow on 20 July 1995. Her husband was the cellist Sviatoslav Knushevitsky.
