= Journal of Solid State Chemistry =

- Discipline: Solid-state chemistry
- Language: English
- Edited by: M.G. Kanatzidis

Publication details
- History: 1969-present
- Publisher: Elsevier
- Frequency: Monthly
- Impact factor: 3.498 (2020)

Standard abbreviations
- ISO 4: J. Solid State Chem.

Indexing
- CODEN: JSSCBI
- ISSN: 0022-4596
- LCCN: 71010527
- OCLC no.: 36946153

Links
- Journal homepage; Online access

The Journal of Solid State Chemistry is a monthly peer-reviewed scientific journal published by Elsevier. The journal covers the chemical, structural, thermodynamic, electronic, and electromagnetic characteristics and properties of solids, including ceramics and amorphous materials. The editor-in-chief is M.G. Kanatzidis (Northwestern University).

== Abstracting and indexing ==
This journal is abstracted and indexed by:

- BioEngineering Abstracts
- Chemical Abstracts Service
- Coal Abstracts - International Energy Agency
- Current Contents/Physics, Chemical, & Earth Sciences
- Engineering Index
- Science Abstracts
- Science Citation Index

According to the Journal Citation Reports, the journal has a 2020 impact factor of 3.498.

== See also ==
- Solid-state chemistry
