= Sergey Antonov =

Russian-born cellist

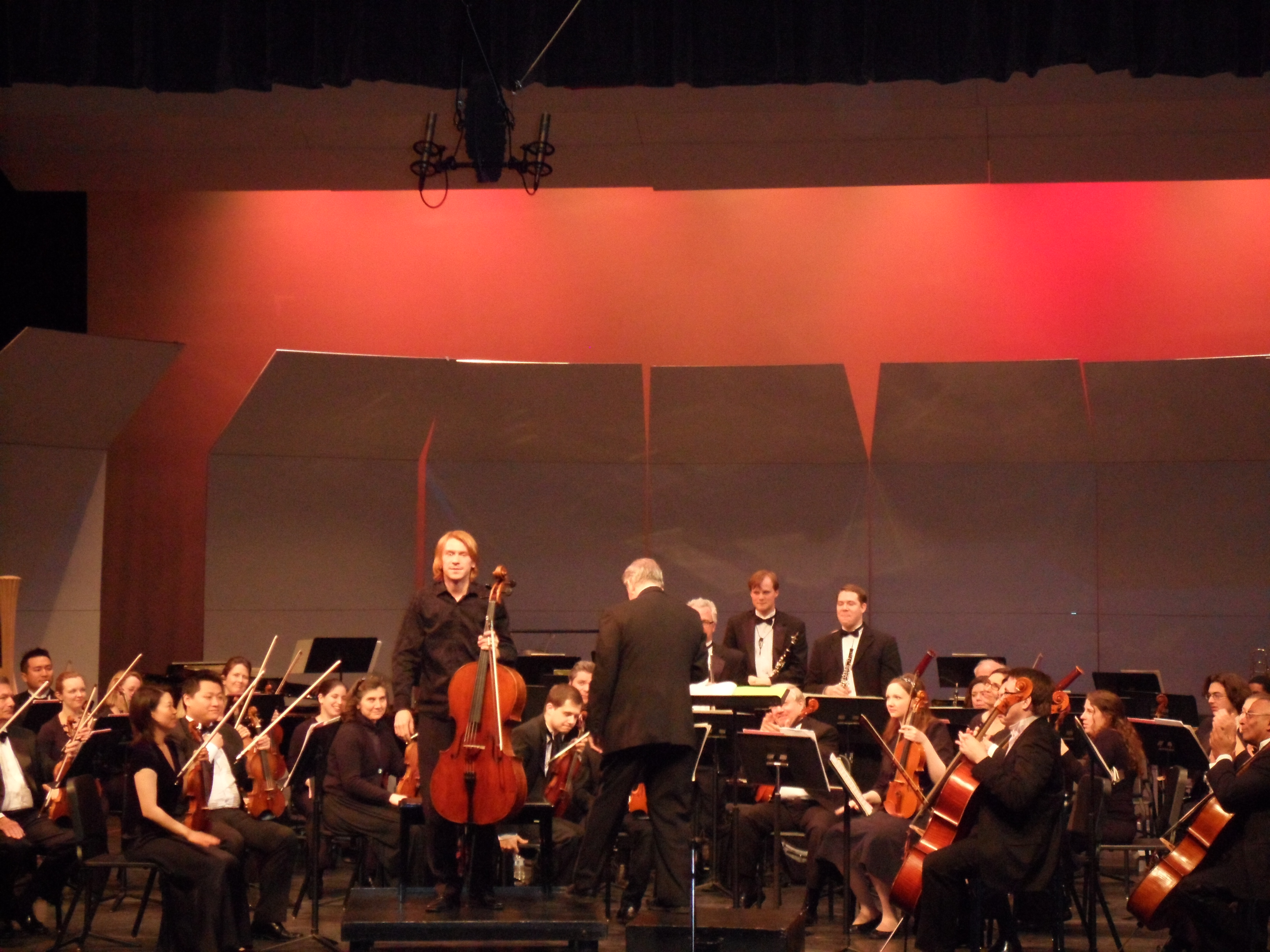
Boston Civic Symphony orchestra Max Hobart conductor featuring award-winning cellist Sergey Antonov, Weston Massachusetts, 2011

Sergey Antonov (Russian: Сергей Антонов; 1983, Moscow) is a Russian-born cellist, living in the United States. In 2007, he was the gold prize winner at the International Tchaikovsky Competition.

== Biography ==
Born in Moscow in 1983 to two cellists, one a teacher at the Central Music School at the Moscow Conservatory, the other a Bolshoi Symphony Orchestra cellist, Antonov began studying the cello at age five. After graduating from the Moscow Conservatory, he studied at an advanced level with, among others, Mstislav Rostropovich. He is currently an Artist Diploma student at Boston's Longy School of Music.

In 2008, he inaugurated, together with pianist Constantine Finehouse, the Trieste Chamber Music Association's Salotto Cameristico to great acclaim.
