= Elena Gnesina =

Russian composer and teacher (1874–1967)

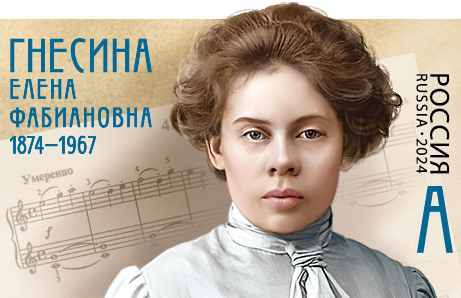
Gnesina on a 2024 stamp of Russia

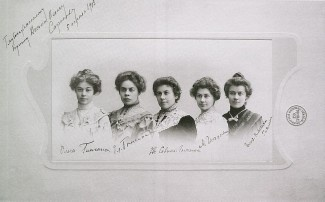
The Gnesin sisters c. 1904 (l. to r. Olga, Elena, Evgenia, Maria and Elizaveta)

Elena Fabianovna Gnesina (or Gnessina; Russian: Елена Фабиановна Гнесина; 30 May 1874 – 4 June 1967) was a Soviet and Russian composer, pianist and music educator, a sister of the composer Mikhail Gnesin.

Gnesina was born in Rostov-on-Don to Rabbi Fabian Osipovich Gnesin (d. 1891) and his wife Bella Isaevna (née Fletzinger), who was a singer and pianist who had studied with Stanisław Moniuszko. She studied piano at the Moscow Conservatory under Vasily Safonov. She also had lessons from Ferruccio Busoni and Sergei Taneyev. She graduated in 1893. In 1895 she established, with her sisters Evgenia and Maria, a private music school in Moscow, which became in 1926 the Gnesin State Musical College. Her students included the pianist Lev Oborin and the composer Aram Khachaturian. Amongst the teachers at the school were Mikhail Gnesin and Alexander Gretchaninov. She remained a senior administrator of the college until her death.

Amongst her compositions are piano études and works for children, and textbooks on music.

Gnesina's apartment, at ul. Povarskaya 30/36, Moscow, is maintained as a memorial museum to her.

Gnesina received numerous state awards, including two Orders of Lenin, and recognition as an Honoured Worker of the Arts Industry of the RSFSR (1935). She died in Moscow in 1967 and is buried in the Novodevichy Cemetery.
