= Lev Oborin =

Soviet pianist (1907–1974)

- Лев Оборин
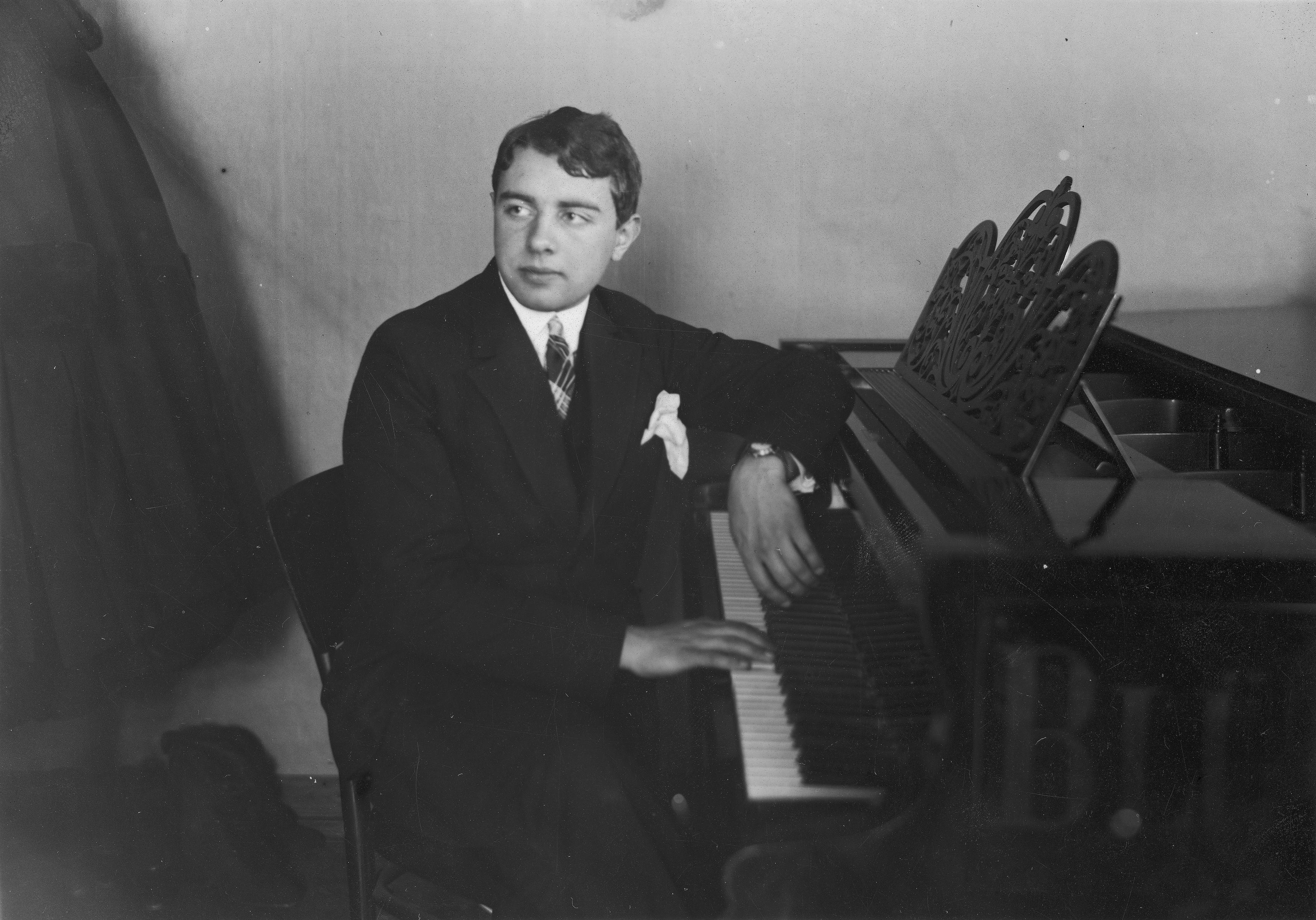
- Born: Lev Nikolayevich Oborin; 11 September 1907; Moscow, Russian Empire
- Died: 5 January 1974 (aged 66); Moscow, Russian SFSR, Soviet Union
- Occupations: Pianist; composer; pedagogue
- Musical career

Lev Nikolayevich Oborin (Russian: Лев Николаевич Оборин); (Moscow, 11 September [O.S. 29 August] 1907 – Moscow, 5 January 1974) was a Soviet and Russian pianist, composer and pedagogue. He was the winner of the first International Chopin Piano Competition in 1927.

== Life and career ==
Oborin's family moved frequently during his early childhood. When they settled down in Moscow in 1914, he was sent to music school. He studied with Elena Gnesina, a pupil of Ferruccio Busoni. At the same time, he studied composition with Alexander Gretchaninov and achieved admirable results.

In 1921 Oborin was accepted into Moscow Conservatory as a student of piano and composition. He completed his piano studies in 1926. In the same year, news reached Moscow of the First International Frédéric Chopin Piano Competition, to be held in Warsaw in 1927, and his piano teacher Konstantin Igumnov immediately thought of him. After winning first prize in the competition, he gave concerts in Poland and in Germany. Until 1945 he performed exclusively in Russia and taught at the Moscow Conservatory at the same time.

In 1935 he played his first concert with the violinist David Oistrakh, with whom he continued to collaborate all of his life.

Aram Khachaturian dedicated his Piano Concerto in D-flat major to Oborin, and wrote "When I was working on my concerto I dreamed of hearing it played by Lev Oborin. My dream came true in the summer of 1937. The wonderful performance by this outstanding pianist ensured its success".

During the years 1941 to 1963, Oborin played in a piano trio with David Oistrakh and the cellist Sviatoslav Knushevitsky, achieving international fame. Khachaturian's three concertos, one each for piano, violin and cello, were written for the individual members of this trio.

He gave first public performances of the works of several modern composers, including Khachaturian, Shebalin, Myaskovsky, Prokofiev (including the Violin Sonata No. 1 with Oistrakh), and Shostakovich.

He trained many pianists, including Vladimir Ashkenazy (winner of the second prize at the 1955 Chopin Competition), Anatoly Dokumentov, Mikhail Voskresensky, Minoru Nojima, Dmitri Sakharov, Alexander Bakhchiev, Andrei Egorov, Lev Natochenny, Boris Berman, Eduard Miansarov and Olga Kiun.

Oborin was a member of the jury of the Fourth and Fifth International Chopin Competitions, and of other competitions in Moscow, Lisbon, Paris, Leeds and Zwickau.

He died in 1974, aged 66.

== Honours and awards ==
- Stalin Prize, second class (1943) - for a concert and performing activities
- People's Artist of the RSFSR (1955)
- People's Artist of the USSR (1964)
- Glinka State Prize of the RSFSR (1966) - for a concert and performing activities
- Two Orders of Lenin (1946, in connection with the 80th anniversary of the Moscow Conservatory; 1966, in connection with the 100th anniversary of the Moscow Conservatory)
- Order of the Red Banner of Labour
- Order of the Badge of Honour (1937)
