= Michael Endres =

German musician

Michael Endres (born 1961) is a German/New Zealand pianist.

He was a professor of piano from 1993 to 2004 at the Hochschule für Musik in Cologne, and from 2004 to 2009 at the Hochschule Hanns Eisler in Berlin. From 2009 to February 2014, he taught at the University of Canterbury in Christchurch, New Zealand, and 2014–2018 at the Barratt Due Institute of Music in Oslo, Norway. He resides currently in New Zealand.

== Early life and training ==
He was born 1961 in Sonthofen in the Oberallgäu region of the Bavarian Alps and studied with Hugo Steurer, Klaus Schilde and Karl Hermann Mrongovius in Munich, then with Jacob Lateiner at the Juilliard School New York, where he received his master's degree, and later with Peter Feuchtwanger in London.

For many years, Michael Endres was the pianist to the late baritone Hermann Prey.

== Repertoire ==
As well as specializing in Mozart, Schubert, Schumann and Ravel, he has a wide repertoire including the somewhat neglected composers Carl Maria von Weber, Leopold Godowsky, Gabriel Fauré, Sir Arnold Bax and Eduard Tubin. His comprehensive recordings include the complete sonatas of Franz Schubert, Wolfgang Amadeus Mozart, Carl Maria von Weber and Arnold Bax, the complete piano works of Maurice Ravel and George Gershwin as well as a complete recording of the 400 dances of Franz Schubert, the 48 Songs without Words by Felix Mendelssohn Bartholdy and 3 CDs of works by Robert Schumann. In March 2018 the 13 Barcarolles by Gabriel Faure were added to his discography. His recordings have received many prizes including Choc du Musique and Diapason d'Or and he has appeared at many major festivals and concert-halls around the world, such as the Salzburg Festival, Wigmore Hall London, Newport Festival, Wiener Musikverein and Suntory Hall, Tokyo.

== Style ==
His playing is often described as subtle, elegant and refined regarding his recordings, where he does not take the dramatic elements of the music to the extreme. This is more than compensated for by the insights that he brings and the remarkable clarity of his readings and playing. On the concert stage he often follows a riskier approach. The Boston Globe reviewer Richard Dyer described him as following during his Newport Festival debut:

"Endres has made an admirable series of records for Capriccio and Oehms Classics -- Mozart, Ravel, Weber, Schumann, and the finest recent account of the complete Schubert sonatas -- but the CDs don't begin to do him justice. They are poised, thoughtful, and expressive, but there is no hint of the wild-man risk-taking that marked his Newport recital. Endres took big chances, communicated how thrilling every dimension of the music was to him, and succeeded triumphantly against the odds."

== Recordings ==
- Wolfgang A. Mozart: Complete Sonatas for piano (5 CDs)- Arte Nova Classics - 74321 63639 2
- Franz Schubert: Complete Sonatas for piano (6 CDs)
- Franz Schubert: Complete dances (5 CDs)
- Franz Schubert: Wandererfantasy and other works
- Franz Schubert: Impromptus Opus 90 and Opus 142
- Carl Maria von Weber: Complete piano sonatas und other works (2 CDs)
- Felix Mendelssohn Bartholdy: Lieder ohne Worte ( complete ) (2 CDs)
- Robert Schumann: Piano works (3 CDs)
- Arnold Bax: Complete Sonatas for piano (2 CDs)
- Gabriel Faure: 13 Barcarolles
- Maurice Ravel: Complete piano works (2 CDs)
- George Gershwin: Works for piano
- Carl Loewe: Ballades (with Hermann Prey)
- Franz Schubert & Johann: W. Kalliwoda (with Ashan Pillai)
