= Egine =

Russian-Armenian singer (born 1989)

Egine Grigorian
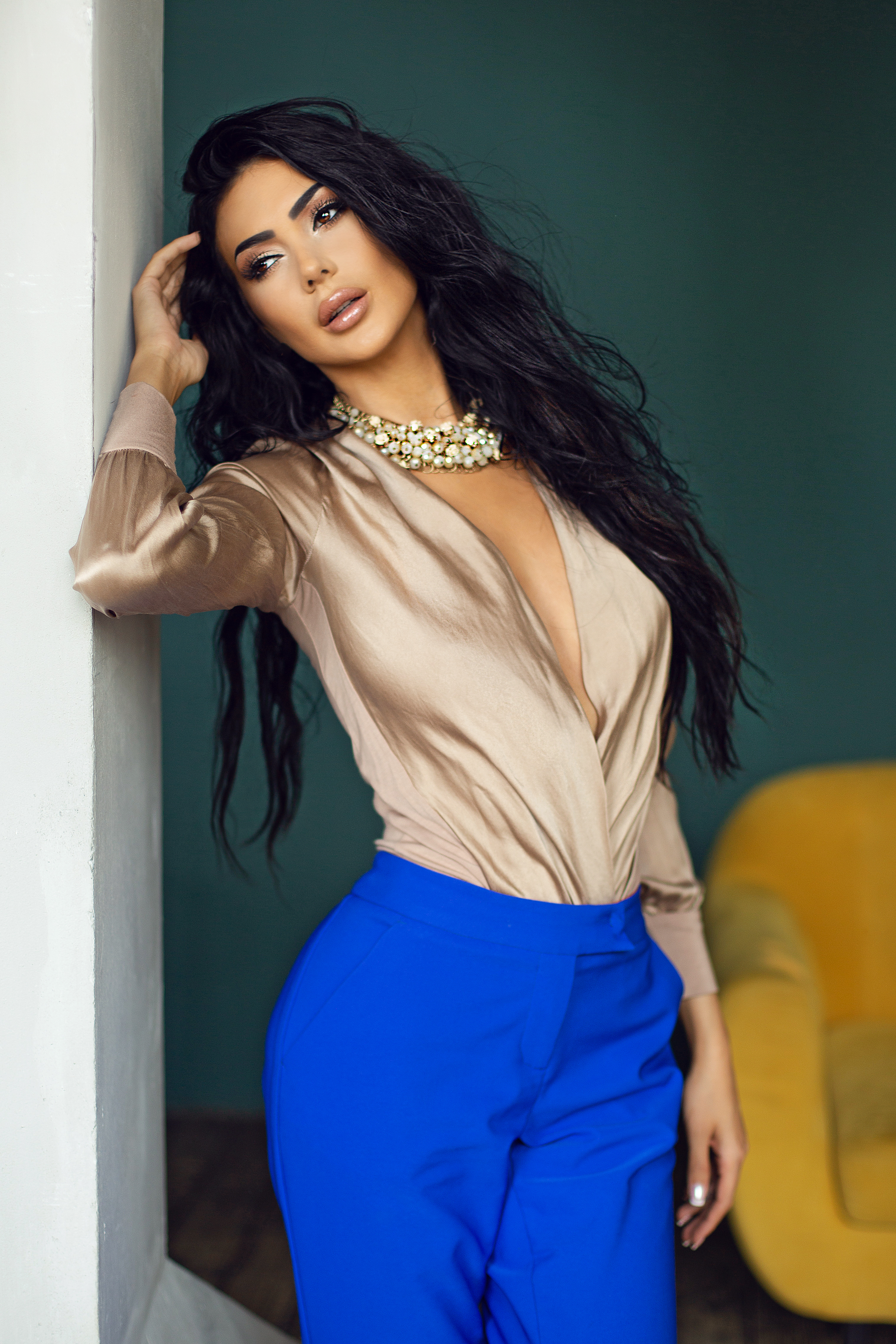

Background information
- Also known as: EGINE / Иджùн
- Born: Heghine Grigorian; 15 September 1989 (age 36); Yerevan, Armenia
- Genres: Pop, R&B
- Occupation: Singer-songwriter
- Instrument: Vocals
- Years active: 2010–present
- Website: egineofficial.com

Heghine Grigorian (Armenian: Հեղինե Գրիգորյան, born 1989) or Egine (Armenian: Իջին, Russian: Иджùн) or Ezhine, is an Armenian-Russian singer and songwriter based in Miami.

== Biography ==
Egine was born in Yerevan, Armenia and raised in Russia. Egine inherited the gift of music on a genetic level. Her father is an accomplished guitar player and her mother is a singer and a vocal teacher. Her musical instruction started at the age of seven, continued through high school and saw her ultimately enroll at the Gnessin State Musical College of Pop & Jazz Arts in Moscow, Russia which She graduated with honors Gnessin State Musical College.

After the Championship of Performing Arts, Egine received offers from production companies worldwide. And she was noticed by a production company that was based in Miami which Egine signed a contract with for seven years. Since then her career has started in the US.

== Career ==
=== Depi Evratesil ===
In 2016, Grigoryan took part in Depi Evratesil (the national final organised by AMPTV to select the artist to represent Armenia in the Eurovision Song Contest 2017).

== Awards and nominations ==
Year	Award	Category	Result
2012	Armenia Music Awards	Discovery of the Year	Won

Year	Award	Category	Result
2019	Art & Business Awards	The Best Musical Project	Won

Year	Award	Category	Result
2019	Great Personaz 2019	Best new artist	Won
