= Inna Faliks =

American classical musician, pianist, educator, author

- Born: September 19, 1978 (age 47); Odessa, Ukraine
- Occupations: Classical pianist; Pedagogue
- Years active: 1989–present
- Website: www.innafaliks.com

Inna Faliks is a Ukrainian-American classical pianist, educator, and author.

A touring concert pianist and a Yamaha artist, she holds the posts of Professor of Piano and Head of Piano at the UCLA Herb Alpert School of Music. She has made many concert tours performing both classical and contemporary works around the world, as a soloist and with orchestras.

Composers who have written music specifically for her include Clarice Assad, Lev Zhurbin, Timo Andres, Billy Childs, Richard Danielpour, Paola Prestini, and Peter Golub. In 2019 she performed the world premiere of Danielpour's Eleven Bagatelles for Piano.

== Early life ==
Faliks was born in 1978 in Odessa, in today's Ukraine but then part of the Soviet Union. She started piano lessons at the age of five with her piano-teacher mother, Irene Faliks. To escape antisemitism, Faliks (age 10) and her family emigrated as refugees from Odessa to Chicago, with a two-month interim stay in Rome.

In 1994 at age 15 she debuted with the Chicago Symphony Orchestra, performing music by Tchaikovsky.

Her musical education after emigrating to the United States in the late 1980s included studying with Boris Petrushansky and with Emilio del Rosario at the Music Institute of Chicago; receiving a Graduate Performance Diploma and master's degree at the Peabody Conservatory studying with Leon Fleisher and Ann Schein; receiving an Artist Diploma from the Accademia Pianistica Internazionale in Imola, Italy; and earning a Doctorate with Gilbert Kalish at Stony Brook University.

In 2008 she founded a poetry-music series in New York City for the Manhattan Arts Council called Music/Words, which she also curated. It featured classical music performances and live poetry readings.

In the late 2000s and early 2010s she commuted between New York and Chicago as a member of the Northeastern Illinois University piano faculty in Chicago.

In 2013 she joined the UCLA faculty, where she is Professor of Piano and Head of Piano. That year she co-starred with Lesley Nicol in two performances of "Admission – One Shilling," a play for pianist and actor based on the life of British pianist Dame Myra Hess.

Faliks has toured with an autobiographical monologue-recital, "Polonaise-Fantasie: The Story of a Pianist." Delos Records issued a recording of the show in 2017.

In 2018 she formed the Hollywood Piano Trio with violinist Roberto Cani and cellist Robert deMaine.

Backbeat Books published her memoir Weight in the Fingertips in October 2023.

== Personal life ==
Faliks lives in California with her husband and two children.

In 2021 she wrote of her mother's decision to choose legal suicide in Switzerland after a struggle with cancer.

== Discography ==
- Stranger Things (Navona Records, 2026)
- Manuscripts Don't Burn (Sono Luminis, 2024)
- Reimagine: Beethoven & Ravel (Navona Records, 2021)
- The Schumann Project, Volume 1 (MSR Classics, 2021)
- Polonaise-fantasie: The Story of a Pianist (Delos Records, 2017)
- Beethoven: Piano Sonata No. 32 in c minor Op. 111 (MSR Classics, 2013)
- Sound of Verse (MSR Classics, 2009)

== Awards ==
- Pro Musicis International Award (2005)
- Grand Prize winner, St. Charles International Piano Competition (2005)
- 40 Under Forty (Stony Brook University, 2016)
