= Joseph McLellan =

Joseph Duncan McLellan (March 27, 1929 – December 26, 2005), known as Joe, was The Washington Post's music critic for more than three decades as well as a chess and book reviewer.

McLellan was born in Quincy, Massachusetts, on March 27, 1929, and grew up in Somerville, Massachusetts. He received his bachelor's degree in French from Boston College in 1951 and his master's degree in French literature, also from Boston College, in 1953. He planned to be a professor of French literature but began doing freelance music reviews and found that he had a talent for journalism.

He once told Washingtonian magazine: "To be the primary critic of a monopoly newspaper is an overwhelming role. You have to tread softly and be fully aware that your taste is not the only valid taste. All these years, I pasted in the front of my mind that there are many ways to be good."

In addition to serving as chief music critic for the Washington Post, McLellan wrote a chess column, wrote for the Book World section and covered White House parties and other society events for the Style section. He covered world chess matches, and edited a syndicated column by the Czech-American grandmaster Lubomir Kavalek. During his career he taught literature classes at American University; he also taught journalism classes at George Washington University.

He reputedly taught himself to write as a youngster by reading How to Write, a book that came as a bonus with a set of encyclopedias he bought with money earned from his paper route.

McLellan died of kidney failure on December 26, 2005. He had continued to review concerts for The Washington Post until the fall of 2005.
