= Irina Lankova =

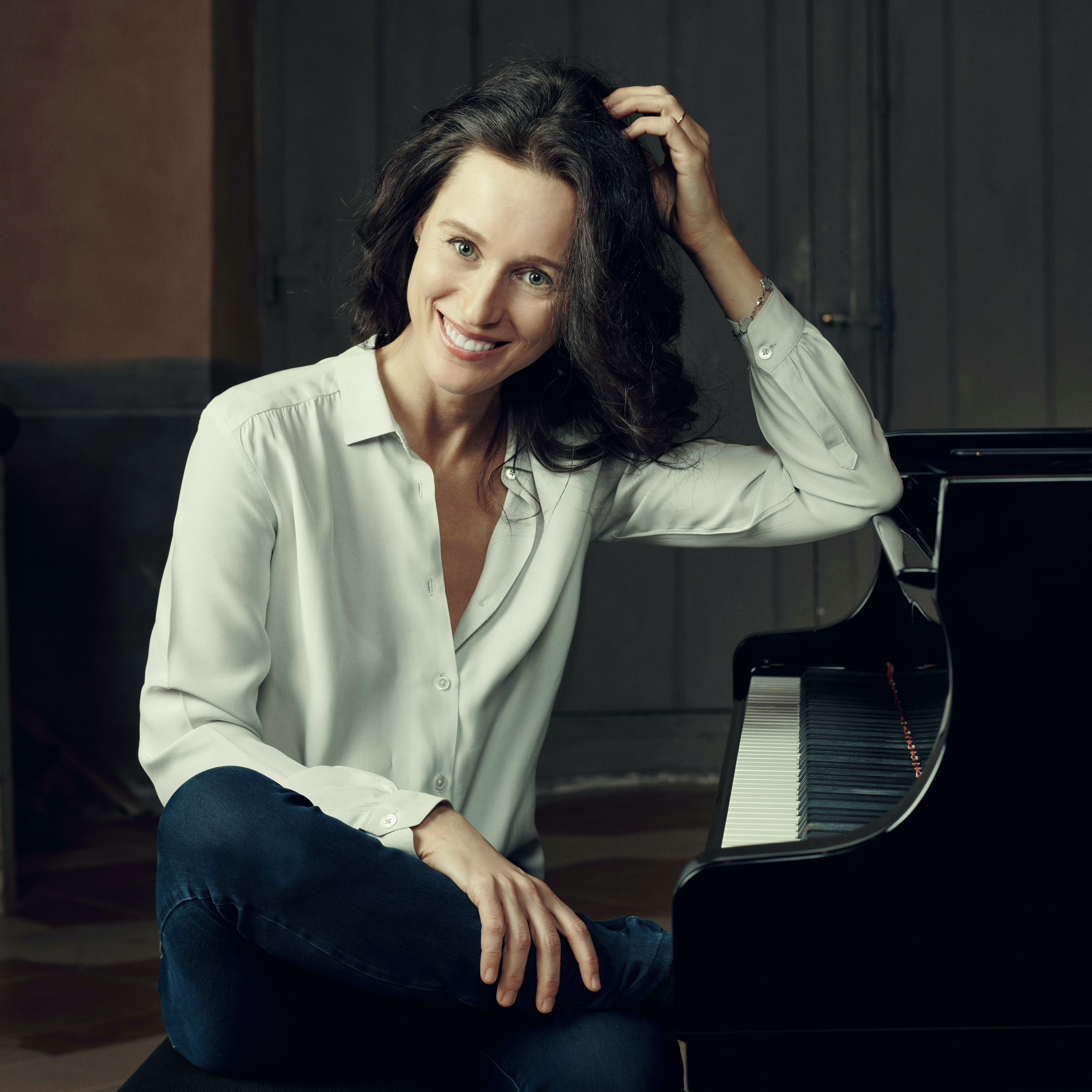
- Lankova c. 2018

Background information
- Birth name: Irina Aleksandrovna Lankova
- Born: September 11, 1977 (age 47); Michurinsk, Soviet Union
- Genres: Classical
- Occupation: Pianist
- Instruments: Piano
- Website: http://www.irinalankova.com/

Irina Alexandrovna Lankova (Russian: Ирина Александровна Ланькова; born 11 September 1977) is a Russian-born Belgian concert pianist.

== Early life and education ==
Irina Lankova is a graduate with highest honors from Gnessin State Musical College in Moscow and from The Royal Conservatory of Brussels. She studied with several great pianists from the Russian School, including Evgeny Moguilevsky (a pupil of Heinrich Neuhaus), Irina Temchenko, and Vladimir Ashkenazy.

== Career ==
Irina Lankova has performed on prestigious stages all over the world such as Carnegie Hall in New York, Wigmore Hall in London, Het Concertgebouw in Amsterdam, Salle Gaveau in Paris, Flagey in Brussels, Cidades das Artes in Rio and many others. She has been invited to play in many international festivals: Piano Folies Touquet, L'Esprit du piano, Académie d'Eté de Nice, Sagra Musicale Umbria, Schiermonnikoog Kamermuziekefestival, Festival de Wallonie, Brussels Summer Festival, Fortissimo d'Orleans, Berlin Summer Festival, etc.

Her performances are critically acclaimed for her expressive and poetic interpretations, colorful palette, and rich tone. International critics describe Irina Lankova as a pianist with "genuinely poetic touch" and "infinite palette of colours". After her successful Wigmore Hall debut in 2008, Irina Lankova was invited to join the worldwide piano elite "Steinway Artists".

Her signature way of presenting her recitals with short introductions attracts a wide audience. "Along with her deep and emotional interpretations, she gives short introductions to the music... and creates something less conventional where everyone feels welcomed", International Piano Magazine.

Her albums dedicated to Rachmaninoff, Scriabin, Chopin and Schubert are highly acclaimed by critics for their "great sensitivity" (Pianiste), "very personal narrative" (La Libre Belgique) and "compelling authority" (The Independent). In March 2021, she released her latest album "Elégie" featuring her favorite pieces by Rachmaninov, Schubert, and Bach.

In 2020, After many years of working on Bach's Goldberg Variations, she created a multimedia project entitled "Goldberg Visions," together with French visual artist Isabelle Françaix, which combines music and video.

The artist's YouTube channel counts several million views and includes many videos from concerts, home recordings, and her 'Piano Unveiled' series.

Since 2015, she has served as the artistic director of the International Max Festival in Belgium.

== Personal life ==
Lankova is married to a Belgian architect and has two children; she lives in Walloon Brabant, Belgium.

== Discography ==
- Sergei Rachmaninov, Franz Liszt (2004, CD): Rachmaninov Preludes Op. 23, Liszt Rapsodie No. 2 with cadence by Rachmaninov
- Alexander Scriabin (2006, CD): Sonates No. 2 & No. 9, Pieces Op. 32, Op. 57
- Frédéric Chopin (2008, CD): Sonata No. 3, Ballade No. 1, Scherzo No. 2, Nocturnes
- Franz Schubert (2013, CD Indésens): Drei Klavierstücke D. 946, Piano Sonata D. 959, Impromptu D. 899 No. 3
- "Caprice" (2015, CD Indésens): with violinist Tatiana Samouil
- "Goldberg Visions" (2020, CD): Johann Sebastian Bach Goldberg Variations
- "Elégie" (2021, CD): Rachmaninov, Schubert and Bach
- "A Moment Illuminating Eternity" (2023, CD) : Rachmaninov, Scriabin, Chopin
