= Central Musical School =

Performing arts school in Moscow, Russia

- Центральная музыкальная школа
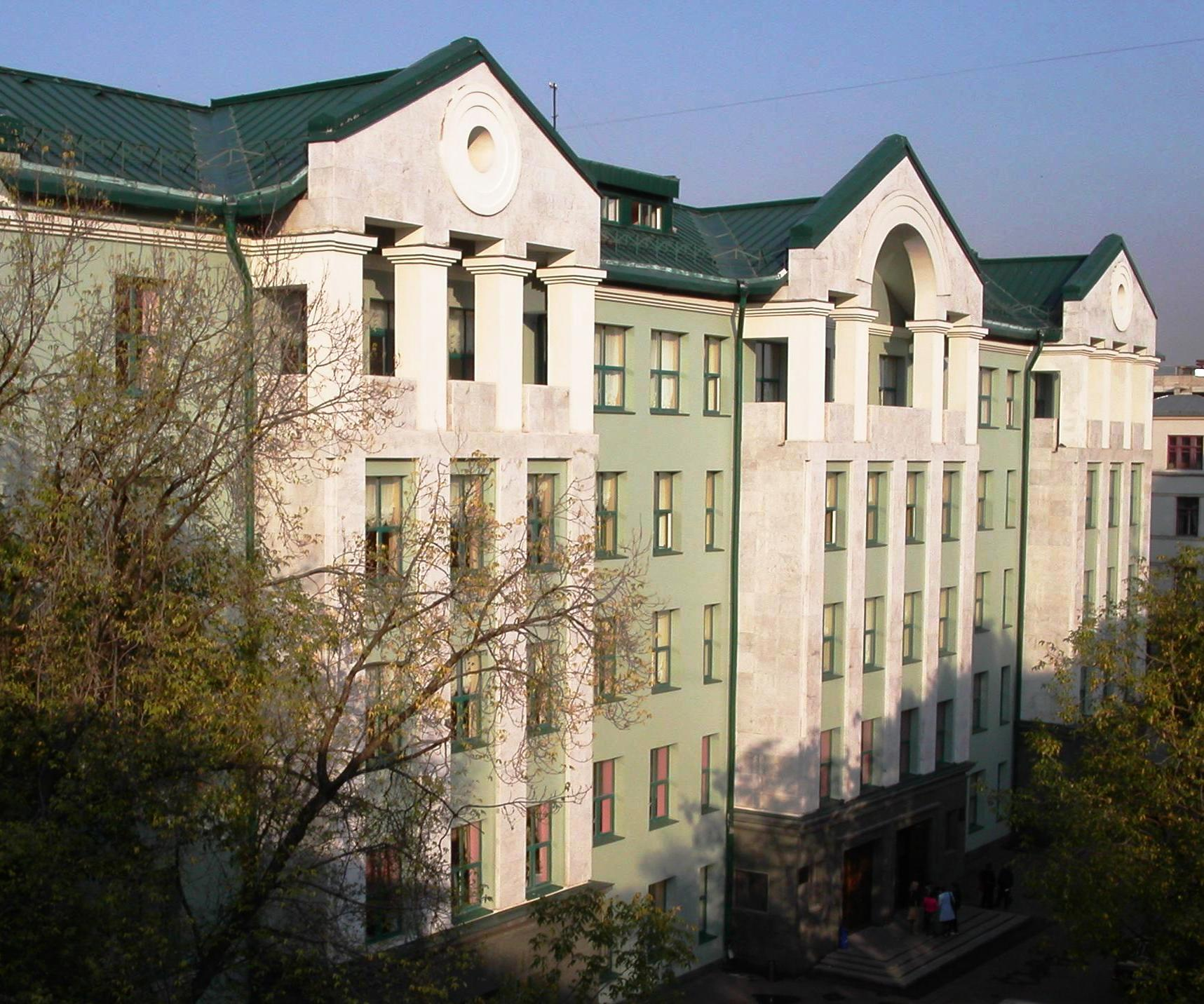
- Type: Music school
- Established: 1935
- Location: Moscow, Russia; 55°45′17″N 37°36′17″E

The Central Musical School - Academy of Performing Arts (Russian: Центральная музыкальная школа — Академия исполнительского искусства) is an Academy of performing arts and specialized children's music school with an eleven-year curriculum. Instruction is provided in both music specialties and general education subjects. It was established in 1935 on the basis of the Children's Department of the Moscow Conservatory, founded in 1932. The school was awarded the Order "For Merit in Culture and Art".

== History ==
In 1932 a Children's Department was established at the Moscow State Tchaikovsky Conservatory to prepare students for admission to higher music education institutions. The initiative was initiated by Professor Aleksandr Goldenweiser and the Conservatory's director, Stanislav Shatsky. A Special Children's Group for especially gifted children (approximately 15 students) was organized. In 1935, by decree of the Council of People's Commissars of the Soviet Union, the Children's Department of the Moscow Conservatory was renamed the Central Musical School of the Moscow Conservatory. The Special Children's Group is integrated into the school system. The school is moved to a two-story building next to the Moscow Conservatory. The school offered both music classes and general education classes, following the secondary school curriculum. In August 1941, due to the Great Patriotic War, the Central Musical School was evacuated to Penza. Teachers and students were housed in the art school building, while classes were held in the premises of Penza Children's Music School No. 1. In October 1943, the Central Musical School returned to Moscow. The school moved into a new, standard four-story building constructed near the Moscow Conservatory. In 1954 the theory and composition department opened at the Central Musical School.

In the 1960s a boarding school opened in a pre-revolutionary mansion next to the Central Musical School. This opened the door for children from all over the Soviet Union to study at the school. In 1979 the Central Musical School closed for major renovations and was moved to a neighboring building. Early the following year, it returned to its original location. In 1987 the Central Musical School building was declared unsafe and unfit for classes. In the fall of that year, the Central Musical School and boarding school were relocated to 15 General Karbyshev Boulevard, Building 3 (Oktyabrskoye Pole metro station) into a standard five-story school building, unsuitable for the simultaneous teaching of music and general subjects. The boarding school was located in the same building on the second floor (nicknamed "the goat's house" by students) and lacked rehearsal rooms with pianos where students could independently rehearse musical pieces. The reconstruction of the old building lasted 18 years.

In 2005 the reconstruction of the Central Musical School building was fully completed. The Central Musical School returned to its original location, a building fully equipped with everything necessary for music lessons. The official opening of the renovated school took place on March 21st, attended by Minister of Culture, Alexander Sokolov and his predecessor, Mikhail Shvydkoy. In the spring of that year, the boarding school also returned to its original location.
