= Predrag Mužijević =

Bosnian pianist

Predrag ("Pedja") Mužijević is a Bosnian pianist.

He shared with Benjamin Frith the 1986 Concorso Busoni's 2nd prize, with the first prize being declared void. Mužijević has an international concert career. He lives in the United States, where he has recorded nine CDs.
