= Alexander Gauk =

Soviet conductor (1893–1963)

Alexander Vasilyevich Gauk (Russian: Алекса́ндр Васи́льевич Га́ук; 15 August [O.S. 3 August] 1893 – 30 March 1963) was a Soviet conductor and composer.

== Biography ==
Alexander Gauk was born in Odessa in 1893. He recalled his first experience as hearing army bands and his mother singing and accompanying herself at the piano. When he was seven he began piano studies and at 17 travelled to St. Petersburg and managed to gain entrance to the class of Daugover, later moving over to Felix Blumenfeld. He saw Arthur Nikisch, Claude Debussy, and Richard Strauss conduct and was particularly taken with Nikisch.

== Career ==
Gauk's first conducting experience was in 1912 with a student orchestra, and professionally on 1 October 1917 for a production of Pyotr Ilyich Tchaikovsky's Cherevichki at the Petrograd Musical Drama Theatre. He spent much of the 1920s as conductor for the Mariinsky Ballet. He married the ballerina Elena Gerdt.

From 1930 to 1934, he was chief conductor of the Leningrad Philharmonic Orchestra. On 6 November 1931, he conducted that orchestra and the Academy Capella Choir in the world premiere of Dmitri Shostakovich's Third Symphony.

From 1932 he worked in Moscow and became chief conductor of a new radio orchestra in 1936, which evolved into the USSR State Symphony Orchestra. During the Second World War, after escaping from Riga, he taught in Moscow, before spending two years at the Tbilisi Conservatory and reviving the Georgian State Symphony Orchestra.

He helped to reconstruct Sergei Rachmaninoff's First Symphony from the orchestral parts found in the archives of the Moscow Conservatory in 1944; the manuscript score was lost in the 1920s. He conducted the world premiere of Aram Khachaturian's Cello Concerto in Moscow in 1946.

Gauk's own compositions include a symphony, chamber works for strings and works for piano. He left an unfinished autobiography.

His discography is now only partly available; Brilliant Classics released two box sets (Vol. 1, 2008; Vol. 2, 2010) with recordings taken from broadcasts of works by Russian and other composers.

His most notable students were Eduard Grikurov, Yevgeny Mravinsky, Ilya Musin, and Yevgeny Svetlanov.

Cultural offices
Preceded by Nikolai Malko	Musical Directors, St Petersburg Philharmonic Orchestra; 1930–1934	Succeeded by Fritz Stiedry
Preceded by none	Musical Directors, State Academic Symphony Orchestra of the Russian Federation; 1936–1941	Succeeded by Natan Rakhlin
Preceded by Nikolai Golovanov	Music Directors, Tchaikovsky Symphony Orchestra of Moscow Radio; 1953–1961	Succeeded by Gennady Rozhdestvensky
