= List of compositions by Nikolai Myaskovsky =

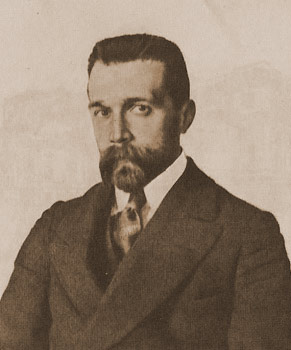
Nikolai Myaskovsky in 1912.

This is a list of compositions by Nikolai Myaskovsky (1881–1950) by category.

== Symphonies ==
- No. 1 in C minor, Op. 3 (1908, rev. 1921)
- No. 2 in C♯ minor, Op. 11 (1911)
- No. 3 in A minor, Op. 15 (1914)
- No. 4 in E minor, Op. 17 (1918)
- No. 5 in D major, Op. 18 (1919)
- No. 6 in E♭ minor, Op. 23 (1923)
- No. 7 in B minor, Op. 24 (1922)
- No. 8 in A major, Op. 26 (1925)
- No. 9 in E minor, Op. 28 (1927)
- No. 10 in F minor, Op. 30 (1927)
- No. 11 in B♭ minor, Op. 34 (1932)
- No. 12 in G minor, Op. 35 (1932) Kolkhoznaya (Collective Farm)
- No. 13 in B♭ minor, Op. 36 (1933)
- No. 14 in C major, Op. 37 (1933)
- No. 15 in D minor, Op. 38 (1934)
- No. 16 in F major, Op. 39 (1934) (Aviation)
- No. 17 in G♯ minor, Op. 41 (1937)
- No. 18 in C major, Op. 42 (1937)
- No. 19 in E♭ major, Op. 46 (1939) for wind orchestra
- No. 20 in E major, Op. 50 (1940)
- No. 21 in F♯ minor, Op. 51 (1940)
- No. 22 in B minor, Op. 54 (1941) Symphony-Ballad
- No. 23 in A minor, Op. 56 (1941) Symphony-Suite on Kabardanian Themes
- No. 24 in F minor, Op. 63 (1943)
- No. 25 in D♭ major, Op. 69 (1946, rev. 1949)
- No. 26 in C major, Op. 79 (1948) Symphony on Russian Themes
- No. 27 in C minor, Op. 85 (1949)

== Other orchestral works ==
- Silence (Molchaniye), symphonic poem after Edgar Allan Poe, Op. 9 (1910)
- Overture for symphony orchestra, Op. 9 bis (1909 orchestration of 1907 piano sonata in G major; rev. 1948)
- Sinfonietta No. 1 in A major for small orchestra, Op. 10 (1911)
- Alastor, symphonic poem after Shelley, Op. 14 (1913)
- Diversions (Razvlyichenie), Op. 32 (1929):
  - No. 1. Serenade for small orchestra
  - No. 2. Sinfonietta No. 2 in B minor for string orchestra
  - No. 3. Lyric Concertino for flute, clarinet, horn, bassoon, harp and string orchestra
- Violin Concerto in D minor, Op. 44 (1938)
- 2 Pieces for string orchestra, Op. 46 bis, arranged from Symphony No.19 (1939)
- Salutation Overture in C major, Op. 48 (1939)
- 2 Marches for wind orchestra, Op. 53 (1941)
- Dramatic Overture for wind orchestra, Op. 60 (1942)
- Links (Zvenya) – Suite for orchestra, Op. 65 (1945) Orchestrations of early piano pieces
- Cello Concerto in C minor, Op. 66 (1944)
- Sinfonietta No. 3 in A minor for string orchestra, Op. 68 (1946)
- Slavonic Rhapsody in D minor, Op. 71 (1946)
- Pathetic Overture in C minor, Op. 76 (1947)
- Divertissement for small orchestra, Op. 80 (1948)

== Choral music ==
- Cantata Kirov is With Us after Tikhonov, for mezzo-soprano, baritone, mixed choir and symphony orchestra to the text of the same name. Poems by Nikolai Tikhonov, Op. 61 (1942-43), Dedication: The Beethoven Quartet"
- Nocturne Kreml nochiu (The Kremlin at Night), after Nikolai Vasiliev, Op. 75 (1947)

== Chamber music ==
- Cello Sonata No. 1 in D major, Op. 12 (1911, rev. 1935)
- String Quartet No. 1 in A minor, Op. 33, No. 1 (1929–30)
- String Quartet No. 2 in C minor, Op. 33, No. 2 (1930)
- String Quartet No. 3 in D minor, Op. 33, No. 3 (1930 revision of early quartet of 1910)
- String Quartet No. 4 in F minor, Op. 33, No. 4 (1930 revision of early quartet of 1911)
- String Quartet No. 5 in E minor, Op. 47 (1938–39)
- String Quartet No. 6 in G minor, Op. 49 (1939–40)
- String Quartet No. 7 in F major, Op. 55 (1941)
- String Quartet No. 8 in F♯ minor, Op. 59 (1942)
- String Quartet No. 9 in D minor, Op. 62 (1943)
- String Quartet No. 10 in F major, Op. 67, No. 1 (1945 revision of early quartet of 1907)
- String Quartet No. 11 in E♭ major, Op. 67, No. 2 (1945)
- Violin Sonata in F major, Op. 70 (1946)
- String Quartet No. 12 in G major, Op. 77 (1947)
- Cello Sonata No. 2 in A minor, Op. 81 (1948)
- String Quartet No. 13 in A minor, Op. 86 (1950)

== Piano music ==
Before his official Piano Sonata No. 1, Myaskovsky composed four or five unpublished piano sonatas. One of these was orchestrated as the Overture for small orchestra, and two more were revised in 1944 to become the official Sonatas Nos. 5 and 6. From about 1907 to 1919, Myaskovsky wrote dozens of short piano pieces as studies or exploratory drafts: he provisionally collected these in eight (unpublished) albums and referred to them collectively as Flofion or by the diminutive Flofionchiki, an apparently made-up word meaning something like 'Frolics' or 'Whimsies'. Several of these were re-worked into the published piano collections Opp. 25, 29, 31, 78 and the orchestral suite Op. 65, while others provided movements – e.g. the slow movement of Piano Sonata No. 4 – or thematic material for later chamber and orchestral works.

- Sonata No. 1 in D minor, Op. 6 (1907)
- Sonata No. 2 in F♯ minor, Op. 13 (1912)
- Sonata No. 3 in C minor, Op. 19 (1920; second, much altered version 1939)
- Sonata No. 4 in C minor, Op. 27 (1924, rev. 1945)
- Whimsies (Prichudi), 6 sketches, Op. 25 (1917–19, rev. 1923)
- Reminiscences (Vospominaniya), 6 pieces, Op. 29 (1907-8; rev. 1927)
- Yellowed Leaves (Pozheltevshiye Straniytsi), 6 Pieces, Op. 31 (1907–19, rev. 1928)
- Three compositions, Op. 43
  - No. 1 10 very elementary pieces for piano (1938)
  - No. 2 Four Easy Pieces in Polyphonic Setting (1907, revised 1938)
  - No. 3 Simple Variations in D major (Lyric Suite for Piano) (1908, revised 1937)
- Sonatina in E minor, Op. 57 (1941)
- Song and Rhapsody (later called Prelude and Rondo-Sonata), Op. 58 (1942)
- Sonata No. 5 in B major, Op. 64, No. 1 (1944 revision of early sonata of 1907)
- Sonata No. 6 in A♭ major, Op. 64, No. 2 (1944 revision of early sonata)
- Stylisations, nine pieces in the forms of ancient dances, Op. 73 (1946)
- From the Past, six improvisations for piano, Op. 74 (1947, final version of piano pieces from 1906/07)
- Polyphonic Sketches, Op. 78 (1947)
- Sonata No. 7 in C major, Op. 82 (1948)
- Sonata No. 8 in D minor, Op. 83 (1949)
- Sonata No. 9 in F major, Op. 84 (1949)

== Songs ==
- Reflections, seven poems by Yevgeny Baratynsky for voice and piano, Op. 1 (1907)
- From the early years, 12 romances for voice and piano to words by Konstantin Balmont, Op. 2 (1903-1906, revised and combined into a cycle: 1945)
- On the Border, 18 romances on words by Zinaida Gippius for medium and deep voice with piano, Op. 4 (1904-1908)
- Songs on Verses of Zinaida Gippius (Three pieces for voice and piano), Op. 5 (1905-1908)
- Madrigal, suite (after five poems by Balmont) for voice and piano, Op. 7 (1908-09; revised 1925)
- Three Sketches to Words by Vyacheslav Ivanov, Op. 8 (1908) 1. The Temple Valley, 2. Pan and Psyche, 3. The Storm
- Hunches, 6 sketches for voice and piano on words by Zinaida Gippius, Op. 16 (1913-14)
- Six Poems by Alexander Blok, for voice and piano, Op. 20 (1921), Dedication: "For MG Hube"
- In Sheltered Days, three sketches on words of Fyodor Tyutchev for voice and piano (1922), Op. 21, Dedication: "For Mrs. JW Koponossowa-Dershanowskaja"
- The Withered Wreath, music to eight poems by Anton Delvig for voice and piano, Op. 22 (1925)
- Twelve Romances on Words of Mikhail Lermontov, for voice and piano, Op. 40 (1935-36)
- Three sketches to Words by Stepan Shchipachev and Leib Kvitko, for voice and piano, Op. 45. Dedication: "For AI Okajemow"
- Songs on Verses of Stepan Schipachev, 10 romances for medium voice and piano, Op. 52 (1940)
- Lyrical Issue, six romances for high voice and piano to words by Mira Mendelson and Robert Burns, Op. 72 (1946), Dedication: "For Mira Mendelson"
