= Symphony No. 9 (Myaskovsky) =

Nikolai Myaskovsky wrote his Symphony No. 9 in E minor, Op. 28, between 1926 and 1927. It was dedicated to Nikolai Malko.

== Background ==
Myaskovsky made the first sketches of the ninth symphony in the summer of 1926 in Tutschkowo. At this time he was not sure whether the work would become a symphony or a suite. He called it an "undefinable music-beast". Then in November Myaskovsky undertook his only journey abroad, which led him first to Warsaw to the inauguration of the Chopin monument and afterward to Vienna. There he met the director of Universal Edition, A. I. Dsimitrowski, in order to sign a contract over the publication of his chamber music.

Myaskovsky however ran fast back to Russia, in order to worry his pupils hard and continue working over his compositions. In Moscow, he prepared in the summer the sketches to the drafts of a symphony, and afterward, he dedicated himself to the conception of the tenth symphony. Only after he orchestrated the ninth symphony, were both works finished.

== Analysis ==
The relatively large-scale symphony is again in four movements, and again, as with Symphonies No. 6 and No. 8, the positions of the Scherzo and the slow movement are exchanged from their usual spots. The music harmonically and melodically resembles the seventh symphony, and stands in contrast to the tenth as the seventh does the sixth. The character is predominantly dreamy and lyric, the tensions of the earlier symphonies are missing.

Myaskovsky had been occupied in this time more closely with the music of Claude Debussy, and from Sergei Prokofiev had been able from Paris to acquire some scores. In Debussy, he admired the manner of representing "the lovely breathing of nature" in his music. The topic material is arranged uncomplicated and based to a large extent on folk songs or folk song-like melodies. Myaskovsky used rich polyphony, but nevertheless, the music remains always transparent. Some melodies and motives are, further, heard throughout the entire piece, more so than in Myaskovsky's earlier symphonies.

The four movements are:

1. Andante sostenuto (E minor)
2. Presto (G♯ minor)
3. Lento molto (F♯ minor)
4. Allegro con grazia (E major)

=== I. Andante sostenuto ===
The first movement begins with dissonant chords, which create a mysterious atmosphere. Only the last one of these chords has a clear kind of tonality rooted in E minor, and introduces the second theme, which is marked with "Moderato malinconico". This melody is contrapuntally varied with the first theme (the theme associated with the dissonant chords). Still later there is a new theme in triplets in the woodwinds.

In the middle of the first movement is a sort of trio in C major, which already anticipates the main theme of the second movement. The reprise brings all parts together and ends with a clear calm, in which isolated fragments of the melodies ring out.

=== II. Presto ===
The second movement, a sort of scherzo, is a sonata form with an altogether brighter tendency than the first movement. Its second theme, which is songful and dance-like, follows the main theme, which was to be heard in the first movement. The remainder of the movement follows the formal example, but towards the end becomes rather bitter and astringent.

=== III. Lento molto ===
S. Gulinskaja describes the theme of the third movement as "of the most beautiful and most intimate melodies of Myaskovsky". Motives from the first movement are to be heard during its progress.

=== IV. Allegro con grazia ===
The finale is a rondo with another dance-like second theme, not quite as light of step as that of the second movement; it concludes with its second theme incredibly inflated, the tempo slowed, and a crashing halt. Motives from the first and second movements are repeated during the finale.

== Reception and criticism ==
The ninth and tenth symphonies were premiered on 29 April 1928, the ninth premiered under the direction of Konstantin Saradzhev. (The tenth was premiered by the conductorless orchestra Persimfans.) The symphony was a success, whether or not it is among the composer's more significant works. Myaskovsky had called it from the beginning "symphonic Intermezzo" and to the tenth symphony had started to attach more meaning nearly at the same time. The composer was nevertheless very content with this work, according to his opinion it was his first "for orchestras easily playable and practicable(?)" work. Nikolai Malko, who had premiered his 5th Symphony, was the dedicatee.
