= List of symphonies in B-flat minor =

This is a list of symphonies in B♭ minor written by notable composers.

Composer	Symphony
Kurt Atterberg	Symphony No. 9 Sinfonia Visionaria, Op 54 (1955-6)
Havergal Brian	Symphony No. 8 (1949); Symphony No. 11 (1954)
Frederic Hymen Cowen	Symphony No. 4
Jānis Ivanovs	Symphony No. 1 (1933)
Dmitry Kabalevsky	Symphony No. 3 "Requiem", Op. 22 (1933)
Miloslav Kabeláč	Symphony No. 5 Dramatic, Op. 41 (1960)
Edgar Stillman Kelley	Symphony "New England", Op. 33 (premiered 1913)
Tikhon Khrennikov	Symphony No. 1, Op. 4 (1935)
Sergei Lyapunov	Symphony No. 2, Op. 66
Borys Lyatoshynsky	Symphony No. 4, Op. 64 (1963)
Albéric Magnard	Symphony No. 3, Op. 11 (1896)
Nikolai Myaskovsky	Symphony No. 11, Op. 34 (1931); Symphony No. 13, Op. 36 (1933)
Ottorino Respighi	Sinfonia Drammatica, P.102 (1914-15)
Harald Sæverud	Symphony No. 3, Op. 5
Dmitri Shostakovich	Symphony No. 13 "Babi Yar", Op. 113 (1962)
Maximilian Steinberg	Symphony No. 2 "In Memoriam Rimsky-Korsakov", Op. 8 (1909)
Alexander Taneyev	Symphony No. 2, Op. 21 (1902)
William Walton	Symphony No. 1 (1932–35)
Richard Wetz	Symphony No. 3, Op. 48 (1920-22)
