= Dies irae =

Latin sequence and liturgical hymn

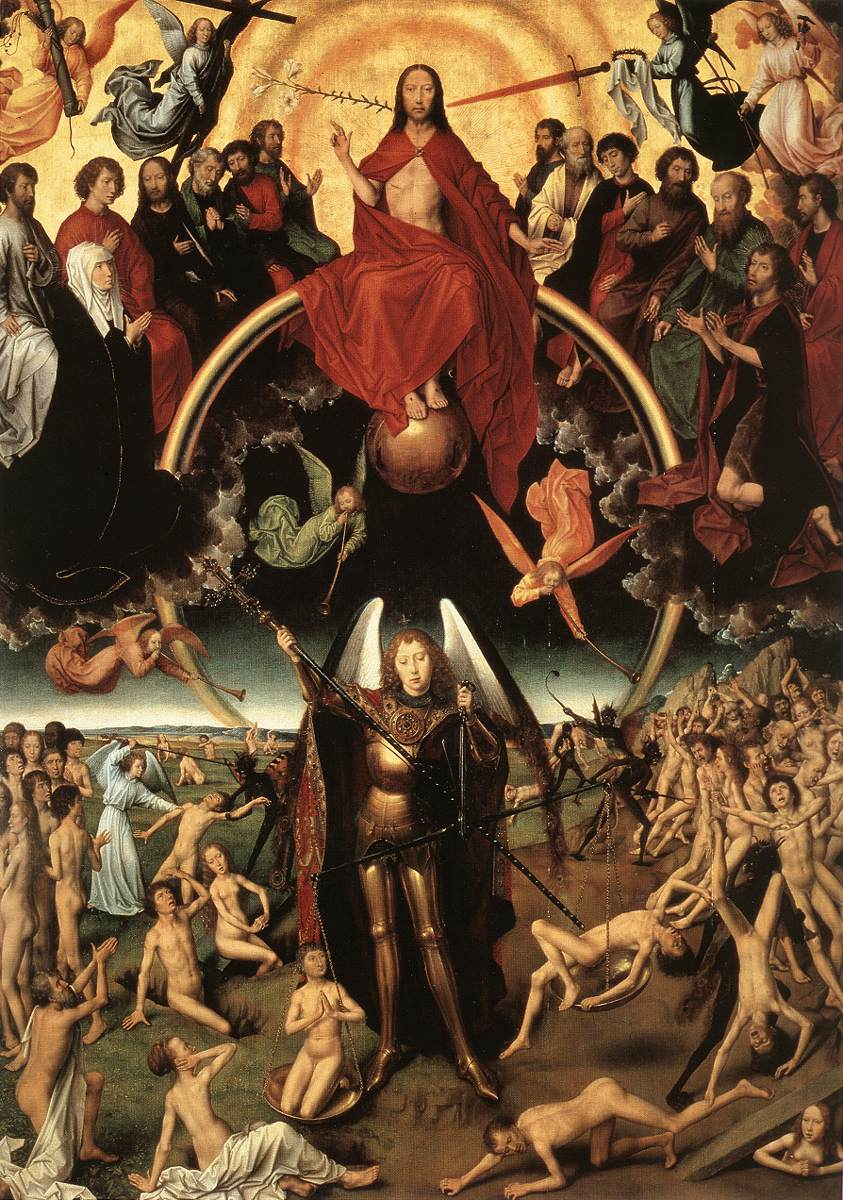
Centre panel from Memling's triptych Last Judgment (c. 1467–1471)

"Dies irae" (Ecclesiastical Latin: [ˈdi.es ˈi.re]; "the Day of Wrath") is a Latin sequence attributed to either Thomas of Celano of the Franciscans (1200–1265) or to Latino Malabranca Orsini (d. 1294), lector at the Dominican studium at Santa Sabina, the forerunner of the Pontifical University of Saint Thomas Aquinas (the Angelicum) in Rome. The sequence dates from the 13th century at the latest, though it is possible that it is much older, with some sources ascribing its origin to St. Gregory the Great (d. 604), Bernard of Clairvaux (1090–1153), or Bonaventure (1221–1274).

It is a medieval Latin poem characterized by its accentual stress and rhymed lines. The metre is trochaic. The poem describes the Last Judgment, the trumpet summoning souls before the throne of God, where the saved will be delivered and the unsaved cast into eternal flames.

It is best known from its use in the Roman Rite Catholic Requiem Mass (also called the Mass for the Dead or Funeral Mass). An English version is found in various Anglican Communion service books.

The first melody set to these words, a Gregorian chant, is one of the most quoted in musical literature, appearing in the works of many composers. The final couplet, Pie Jesu, has been often reused as an independent song.

== Use in the Roman liturgy ==
The Dies irae has been used in the Roman Rite liturgy as the sequence for the Requiem Mass for centuries, as made evident by the important place it holds in musical settings such as those by Mozart and Verdi. It appears in the Roman Missal of 1962, the last edition before the implementation of revisions that occurred after the Second Vatican Council. As such, it is still heard in churches where the Tridentine Latin liturgy is celebrated. It also formed part of the pre-conciliar liturgy of All Souls' Day.

In the reforms to the Catholic Church's Latin liturgical rites ordered by the Second Vatican Council, the "Consilium for the Implementation of the Constitution on the Liturgy", the Vatican body charged with drafting and implementing the reforms (1969–70), eliminated the sequence as such from funerals and other Masses for the Dead. A leading figure in the post-conciliar liturgical reforms, Archbishop Annibale Bugnini, explained the rationale of the Consilium:

They got rid of texts that smacked of a negative spirituality inherited from the Middle Ages. Thus they removed such familiar and even beloved texts as "Libera me, Domine", "Dies irae", and others that overemphasized judgment, fear, and despair. These they replaced with texts urging Christian hope and arguably giving more effective expression to faith in the resurrection.

Dies irae, slightly edited, remains in use ad libitum as a hymn in the Liturgy of the Hours on All Souls' Day and during the last week before Advent, for which it is divided into three parts for the Office of Readings, Lauds and Vespers, with the insertion of a doxology after each part.

=== Indulgence ===
In the Roman Catholic Church there was formerly an indulgence of three years for each recitation and a plenary indulgence for reciting the prayer daily for a month. This indulgence was not renewed in the Manual of Indulgences.

== Text ==
The Latin text below is taken from the Requiem Mass in the 1962 Roman Missal. The first English version below, translated by William Josiah Irons in 1849, albeit from a slightly different Latin text, replicates the rhyme and metre of the original. This translation, edited for more conformance to the official Latin, is approved by the Catholic Church for use as the funeral Mass sequence in the liturgy of the Catholic ordinariates for former Anglicans. The second English version is a more formal equivalence translation.

	Original	Approved adaptation	Formal equivalence
I	Dies iræ, dies illa, Solvet sæclum in favilla: Teste David cum Sibylla.	Day of wrath and doom impending! David's word with Sibyl's blending, Heaven and earth in ashes ending!	The day of wrath, that day, will dissolve the world in ashes: (this is) the testimony of David along with the Sibyl.
II	Quantus tremor est futurus, Quando iudex est venturus, Cuncta stricte discussurus!	Oh, what fear man's bosom rendeth, When from heaven the Judge descendeth, On whose sentence all dependeth.	How great will be the quaking, when the Judge is about to come, strictly investigating all things!
III	Tuba, mirum spargens sonum Per sepulchra regionum, Coget omnes ante thronum.	Wondrous sound the trumpet flingeth; Through earth's sepulchres it ringeth; All before the throne it bringeth.	The trumpet, scattering a wondrous sound through the sepulchres of the regions, will summon all before the throne.
IV	Mors stupebit, et natura, Cum resurget creatura, Iudicanti responsura.	Death is struck, and nature quaking, All creation is awaking, To its Judge an answer making.	Death and nature will marvel, when the creature will rise again, to respond to the Judge.
V	Liber scriptus proferetur, In quo totum continetur, Unde mundus iudicetur.	Lo, the book, exactly worded, Wherein all hath been recorded, Thence shall judgement be awarded.	The written book will be brought forth, in which all is contained, from which the world shall be judged.
VI	Iudex ergo cum sedebit, Quidquid latet, apparebit: Nil inultum remanebit.	When the Judge his seat attaineth, And each hidden deed arraigneth, Nothing unavenged remaineth.	When therefore the Judge will sit, whatever lies hidden, will appear: nothing will remain unpunished.
VII	Quid sum miser tunc dicturus? Quem patronum rogaturus, Cum vix iustus sit securus?	What shall I, frail man, be pleading? Who for me be interceding, When the just are mercy needing?	What then shall I, poor wretch [that I am], say? Which patron shall I entreat, when [even] the just may [only] hardly be sure?
VIII	Rex tremendæ maiestatis, Qui salvandos salvas gratis, Salva me, fons pietatis.	King of Majesty tremendous, Who dost free salvation send us, Fount of pity, then befriend us!	King of fearsome majesty, Who saves the redeemed freely, save me, O fount of mercy.
IX	Recordare, Iesu pie, Quod sum causa tuæ viæ: Ne me perdas illa die.	Think, kind Jesu! — my salvation Caused Thy wondrous Incarnation; Leave me not to reprobation.	Remember, merciful Jesus, that I am the cause of Your journey: lest You lose me in that day.
X	Quærens me, sedisti lassus: Redemisti Crucem passus: Tantus labor non sit cassus.	Faint and weary, Thou hast sought me, On the Cross of suffering bought me. Shall such grace be vainly brought me?	Seeking me, You rested, tired: You redeemed [me], having suffered the Cross: let not such hardship be in vain.
XI	Iuste Iudex ultionis, Donum fac remissionis Ante diem rationis.	Righteous Judge, for sin's pollution Grant Thy gift of absolution, Ere the day of retribution.	Just Judge of vengeance, make a gift of remission before the day of reckoning.
XII	Ingemisco, tamquam reus, Culpa rubet vultus meus; Supplicanti parce, Deus.	Guilty, now I pour my moaning, All my shame with anguish owning; Spare, O God, Thy suppliant groaning!	I sigh, like the guilty one: my face reddens in guilt: Spare the imploring one, O God.
XIII	Qui Mariam absolvisti, Et latronem exaudisti, Mihi quoque spem dedisti.	Through the sinful woman shriven, Through the dying thief forgiven, Thou to me a hope hast given.	You Who absolved Mary, and heard the robber, gave hope to me also.
XIV	Preces meæ non sunt dignæ: Sed tu bonus fac benigne, Ne perenni cremer igne.	Worthless are my prayers and sighing, Yet, good Lord, in grace complying, Rescue me from fires undying.	My prayers are not worthy: but You, [Who are] good, graciously grant that I be not burned up by the everlasting fire.
XV	Inter oves locum præsta, Et ab hædis me sequestra, Statuens in parte dextra.	With Thy sheep a place provide me, From the goats afar divide me, To Thy right hand do Thou guide me.	Grant me a place among the sheep, and take me out from among the goats, setting me on the right side.
XVI	Confutatis maledictis, Flammis acribus addictis, Voca me cum benedictis.	When the wicked are confounded, Doomed to flames of woe unbounded, Call me with Thy saints surrounded.	Once the cursed have been silenced, sentenced to acrid flames, Call me, with the blessed.
XVII	Oro supplex et acclinis, Cor contritum quasi cinis: Gere curam mei finis.	Low I kneel, with heart's submission, See, like ashes, my contrition, Help me in my last condition.	[Humbly] kneeling and bowed I pray, [my] heart crushed as ashes: take care of my end.
XVIII	Lacrimosa dies illa, Qua resurget ex favílla Iudicandus homo reus: Huic ergo parce, Deus:	Ah! that day of tears and mourning, From the dust of earth returning Man for judgement must prepare him, Spare, O God, in mercy spare him.	Tearful [will be] that day, on which from the glowing embers will arise the guilty man who is to be judged: Then spare him, O God.
XIX	Pie Iesu Domine, Dona eis requiem. Amen.	Lord, all-pitying, Jesus blest, Grant them Thine eternal rest. Amen.	Merciful Lord Jesus, grant them rest. Amen.

Because the last two stanzas differ markedly in structure from the preceding stanzas, some scholars consider them to be an addition made in order to suit the great poem for liturgical use. The penultimate stanza, Lacrimosa, discards the consistent scheme of rhyming triplets in favour of a pair of rhyming couplets. The last stanza, Pie Iesu, abandons rhyme for assonance, and, moreover, its lines are catalectic.

In the liturgical reforms of 1969–1971, stanza 19 was deleted and the poem divided into three sections: 1–6 (for Office of Readings), 7–12 (for Lauds) and 13–18 (for Vespers). In addition, "Qui Mariam absolvisti" in stanza 13 was replaced by "Peccatricem qui solvisti" so that that line would now mean, "You who absolved the sinful woman". This was because modern scholarship denies the common mediæval identification of the woman taken in adultery with Mary Magdalene, so Mary could no longer be named in this verse. In addition, a doxology is given after stanzas 6, 12, and 18:

Original

O tu, Deus majestatis,
alme candor Trinitatis
nos conjunge cum beatis. Amen.

Approved adaptation

O God of majesty
nourishing light of the Trinity
join us with the blessed. Amen.

Dynamic equivalence

You, God of majesty,
gracious splendour of the Trinity
conjoin us with the blessed. Amen.

=== Manuscript sources ===
The text of the sequence is found, with slight verbal variations, in a 13th century manuscript in the Biblioteca Nazionale Vittorio Emanuele III at Naples. It is a Franciscan calendar missal that must date between 1253–1255 for it does not contain the name of Clare of Assisi, who was canonized in 1255, and whose name would have been included if the manuscript were of later date.

=== Inspiration ===
A major inspiration of the hymn seems to have come from the Vulgate translation of Sophonias (Zephaniah) 1:15–16:

Dies iræ, dies illa, dies tribulationis et angustiæ, dies calamitatis et miseriæ, dies tenebrarum et caliginis, dies nebulæ et turbinis, dies tubæ et clangoris super civitates munitas et super angulos excelsos.

Translation:

That day is a day of wrath, a day of tribulation and distress, a day of calamity and misery, a day of darkness and obscurity, a day of clouds and whirlwinds, a day of the trumpet and alarm against the fenced cities, and against the high bulwarks. (Douay–Rheims Bible)

Other images come from the Book of Revelation, such as Revelation 20:11–15 (the book from which the world will be judged), Matthew 25:31–46 (sheep and goats, right hand, contrast between the blessed and the accursed doomed to flames), 1 Thessalonians 4:16 (trumpet), 2 Peter 3:7 (heaven and earth burnt by fire), and Luke 21:26 ("men fainting with fear ... they will see the Son of Man coming").

From the Jewish liturgy, the prayer Unetanneh Tokef appears to be related: "We shall ascribe holiness to this day, For it is awesome and terrible"; "the great trumpet is sounded", etc.

=== Other translations ===
A number of English translations of the poem have been written and proposed for liturgical use. A very loose Protestant version was made by John Newton; it opens:

Day of judgment! Day of wonders!
Hark! the trumpet's awful sound,
Louder than a thousand thunders,
Shakes the vast creation round!
How the summons will the sinner's heart confound!

Jan Kasprowicz, a Polish poet, wrote a hymn entitled "Dies iræ" which describes the Judgment day. The first six lines (two stanzas) follow the original hymn's metre and rhyme structure, and the first stanza translates to "The trumpet will cast a wondrous sound".

The American writer Ambrose Bierce published a satiric version of the poem in his 1903 book Shapes of Clay, preserving the original metre but using humorous and sardonic language; for example, the second verse is rendered:

Ah! what terror shall be shaping
When the Judge the truth's undraping –
Cats from every bag escaping!

The Rev. Bernard Callan (1750–1804), an Irish priest and poet, translated it into Gaelic around 1800. His version is included in a Gaelic prayer book, The Spiritual Rose.

=== Literary references ===
- Walter Scott used the first two stanzas in the sixth canto of his narrative poem "The Lay of the Last Minstrel" (1805).
- Johann Wolfgang von Goethe used the first, the sixth and the seventh stanza of the hymn in the scene "Cathedral" in the first part of his drama Faust (1808).
- Oscar Wilde's "Sonnet on Hearing the Dies Iræ Sung in the Sistine Chapel" (Poems, 1881), contrasts the "terrors of red flame and thundering" depicted in the hymn with images of "life and love".
- In Gaston Leroux's 1910 novel The Phantom of the Opera, Erik (the Phantom) has the chant displayed on the wall of his funereal bedroom.
- It is the inspiration for the title and major theme of the 1964 novel Deus Iræ by Philip K. Dick and Roger Zelazny. The English translation is used verbatim in Dick's novel Ubik two years later.

== Music ==
The words of "Dies iræ" have often been set to music as part of the Requiem service. In some settings, it is broken up into several movements; in such cases, "Dies iræ" refers only to the first of these movements, the others being titled according to their respective incipits.

The earliest surviving polyphonic setting of the Requiem, by Johannes Ockeghem, does not include "Dies iræ". The first polyphonic settings to include the "Dies iræ" are by Engarandus Juvenis (1490) and Antoine Brumel (1516) to be followed by many composers of the renaissance. Later, many notable choral and orchestral settings of the Requiem including the sequence were made by composers such as Charpentier, Delalande, Mozart, Berlioz, Verdi, Britten and Stravinsky. Giovanni Battista Martini ended his set of (mostly humorous) 303 canons with a set of 20 on extracts of the sequence poem.

=== 13th-century Gregorian chant ===
"Dies irae" (plainchant)

The original Gregorian setting, dating back to the 13th century, was a sombre plainchant (or Gregorian chant).

It is in the Dorian mode. Its beginning is shown below in four-line neumatic notation, and the equivalent 5-line staff notation:

==== Musical quotations ====
The traditional Gregorian melody gained widespread recognition through its use in Berlioz's Symphonie fantastique. Since then, it has become associated with themes of death and terror, especially during the 19th century. After Berlioz, it was used as a theme or musical quotation in many classical compositions, including:

- Thomas Adès – Totentanz (2013)
- Charles-Valentin Alkan – Souvenirs: Trois morceaux dans le genre pathétique, Op. 15 (No. 3: Morte) (1837)
- Eric Ball – "Resurgam" (1950)
- Ernest Bloch – Suite Symphonique (1944)
- Mel Bonis - La Cathédrale blessée, Op. 107
- Johannes Brahms – Six Pieces for Piano, Op. 118, No. 6, Intermezzo in E-flat minor (1893)
- Mario Castelnuovo-Tedesco – 24 Caprichos de Goya, Op. 195: "XII. No hubo remedio" (plate 24) (1961)
- Frédéric Chopin - Prelude No. 2 in A Minor, Opus 28 (1839), sometimes referred to as "Presentiment to Death" (or "Prelude to Death").
- George Crumb – Black Angels (1970)
- Luigi Dallapiccola – Canti di prigionia
- Michael Daugherty – Metropolis Symphony 5th movement, "Red Cape Tango"; Dead Elvis for bassoon and chamber ensemble (1993)
- Ernst von Dohnányi – No. 4 (E-flat minor) of "Four Rhapsodies" for piano, Op. 11
- Antonio Estévez – Cantata Criolla (1954)
- Alberto Ginastera – Bomarzo, Op. 34 (1967)
- Alexander Glazunov – Symphony No. 5 (4th movement), Op. 55 (1885), From the Middle Ages Suite, No. 2 "Scherzo", Op. 79 (1902)
- Benjamin Godard – Dante opera, act 4, No. 35 Suite du Finale "Partons !" (1890)
- Leopold Godowsky – Sonata in E Minor (1911)
- Charles Gounod – Faust opera, act 4 (1859), Mors et vita, part II, oratorio (1886)
- Henry-George d'Hoedt – Nos. 4 and 5, "Le discours officiel (Intermède calamiteux)" and "Les plaisirs nocturnes (Rumba pour l’heure du Jugement dernier)", from Chroniques brèves de la vie bourgeoise (1934)
- Gustav Holst – The Planets, movement 5, "Saturn, the Bringer of Old Age"
- Arthur Honegger – La Danse des Morts, H. 131 (1938)
- Hans Huber quotes the melody in the second movement ("Funeral March") of his Symphony No. 3 in C major, Op. 118 (Heroic, 1908).
- Alexander Kastalsky – Requiem for Fallen Brothers, movements 3 and 4 (1917)
- Aram Khachaturian – Piano Concerto Op. 38 (1936), Symphony No. 1 (1934), Symphony No. 2 (1944), Concerto-Rhapsody for Piano and Orchestra, Cello Concerto in E minor, Concerto-Rhapsody for Cello and Orchestra, Violin Concerto in D minor
- Teofil Klonowski – Preludes on Polish Church Hymns: Dies Irae (1867)
- György Ligeti – Le Grand Macabre (1974–77)
- Franz Liszt – Totentanz (1849)
- Gustav Mahler – Symphony No. 2, movements 1 and 5 (1888–94)
- Jules Massenet – Ève (1874)
- Nikolai Medtner – Piano Quintet in C, movement 2 (Op.posth)
- Edvard Mirzoyan – Introduction and Perpetuum Mobile (1957)
- Modest Mussorgsky – Songs and Dances of Death, No. 3 "Trepak" (1875)
- Nikolai Myaskovsky – Symphony No. 4 (first movement), Symphony No. 6, Op. 23 (1921–23); Piano Sonata No.2, Op.13, Symphony No. 26, Op. 79 (halfway into first movement), Symphony No. 8 Op. 26 (fourth movement), Symphony No. 9 Op. 28 (third movement)
- Vítězslav Novák – used the theme near the end of his May Symphony
- Sergei Rachmaninoff – Piano Concerto No. 1, Op. 1 (1891); Symphony No. 1, Op. 13 (1895); Six moments musicaux, Op. 16 No. 3 (1896); Suite No. 2, Op. 17 (1901); Symphony No. 2, Op. 27 (1906–07); Piano sonata No. 1 (1908); Isle of the Dead, Op. 29 (1908); The Bells choral symphony, Op. 35 (1913); Études-Tableaux, Op. 39 No. 2, 5, 7 (1916); Piano Concerto No. 4, Op. 40 (1926); Rhapsody on a Theme of Paganini, Op. 43 (1934); Symphony No. 3, Op. 44 (1935–36); Symphonic Dances, Op. 45 (1940)
- Ottorino Respighi – quoted near the end of the second movement of Impressioni Brasiliane (Brazilian Impressions) (1927)
- Camille Saint-Saëns – Danse Macabre; Symphony No. 3 (Organ Symphony), Requiem (1878)
- Alexander Scriabin – Piano Sonata No. 1, Op. 6 (1892)
- Dmitri Shostakovich – Symphony No. 14; Aphorisms, Op. 13 – No. 7, "Dance of Death" (1969)
- Kaikhosru Shapurji Sorabji – Sequentia cyclica super "Dies iræ" ex Missa pro defunctis (1948–49) and nine other works
- Pyotr Ilyich Tchaikovsky – Modern Greek Song (In Dark Hell) Op. 16 No. 6 (1872); 6 Pieces on a Single Theme op 21 (1873); Orchestral Suite No. 3 (1884); Manfred Symphony (1885)
- Frank Ticheli – Vesuvius (1999) for wind band
- Eugène Ysaÿe – Solo Violin Sonata in A minor, Op. 27, No. 2 "Obsession" (1923)
- Bernd Alois Zimmermann – Musique pour les soupers du roi Ubu

It has also been used in many film scores and popular works, such as:

- Michel F. April – main theme of Dead by Daylight soundtrack
- Clint Bajakian, Michael Land, Peter McConnell – the leitmotiv is used in Indiana Jones and the Fate of Atlantis (1992)
- Bathory – on the album Blood Fire Death (1988) and "Day of Wrath" from the album Destroyer of Worlds (2001).
- Jacques Brel – La Mort on the album La Valse à mille temps (1959) derives its verse melody and several instrumental phrases from the tune. The song is best known in English translation as My Death and has been covered by numerous artists including Scott Walker on Scott (1967).
- Wendy Carlos and Rachel Elkind – Opening theme for The Shining (1980)
- Matt Dahan – Opening leitmotif to the song “Damn the Torpedoes” in episode 3 of the radio-style musical series “Pulp Musicals” entitled “The Ghosts of Antikythera”.
- Editors – "Lights" on the album The Back Room (2005)
- Danny Elfman – "Making Christmas" from The Nightmare Before Christmas (1993)
- Gerald Fried – Opening theme for The Return of Dracula, 1958
- Hugo Friedhofer – opening scene of Between Heaven and Hell (film) (1956)
- Diamanda Galás – Masque of the Red Death: Part I – The Divine Punishment
- Michael Giacchino – quoted during the maze bulldozer scene in Zootopia 2 (2025)
- Jerry Goldsmith – The Mephisto Waltz (1971), Poltergeist (1982)
- Donald Grantham – Baron Cimetiére's Mambo (2004)
- Yoshihisa Hirano – "Death Note Theme" from Death Note (2006) and "Riot" from Hunter x Hunter (2011) TV series.
- Guy Gross – "Salve me Lacrimosa" from the American-Australian television series Farscape
- Kirk Hammett – The Incantation (5:57-6:35) on the EP Portals (2022)
- Bernard Herrmann quoted in the main theme for Citizen Kane (1941); Jason and the Argonauts (1963) (quoted during the scene of the scattering of the hydra's teeth)
- Gottfried Huppertz – Score for Metropolis (1927)
- Jethro Tull – The instrumental track "Elegy" featured on the band's 12th studio album Stormwatch is based on the melody.
- Christopher Larkin – "Enter Pharloom", "Awakening", "Silksong", as well as others, from the metroidvania Hollow Knight: Silksong (2025).
- Jonathan Larson – "La Vie Bohème" from Rent (1996) and its 2005 film adaptation, quoted including lyrics
- Led Zeppelin – "Stairway to Heaven" on the album Led Zeppelin IV (1971)
- Robert Lopez and Kristen Anderson-Lopez – Frozen II (soundtrack), "Into the Unknown" (2019)
- Harry Manfredini – main title theme for Friday the 13th Part VI: Jason Lives (1986)
- The Melvins – on their album Nude with Boots (2008)
- Alan Menken and Stephen Schwartz – The Hunchback of Notre Dame (1996) soundtrack; "The Bells of Notre Dame" features passages from the first and second stanzas as lyrics.
- Francis Monkman – additional track "Dies Irae" on Sky's self-titled 1979 studio album.
- Ennio Morricone – "Penance" from his score for The Mission (1986)
- Lionel Newman – Compulsion
- The Newton Brothers – Doctor Sleep, the sequel to The Shining (2019)
- Queensrÿche – The opening verses of "Dies Irae" are used at the beginning of the song "Suite Sister Mary" and other verses throughout that song on their Operation : Mindcrime album.
- Leonard Rosenman – the main theme of The Car (1977)
- Jeff Russo – Mullen's entrance to the Joint Session of Congress from the television series Zero Day score (unknown if included on the 2025 soundtrack).
- Alex Brightman and the Beetlejuice Original Broadway Cast Recording Ensemble – "The Whole "Being Dead" Thing" from the Beetlejuice Broadway musical (2018).
- Stephen Sondheim – Sweeney Todd – quoted in "The Ballad of Sweeney Todd" and the accompaniment to "Epiphany" (1979)
- Symphony X – V: The New Mythology Suite references this work multiple times, such as in the song "A Fool's Paradise".
- Cristobal Tapia de Veer – The White Lotus opening credits
- Lorien Testard – "Spring Meadows – Beneath the Blue Tree" from the role-playing video game Clair Obscur: Expedition 33 (2025).
- John Williams – "Old Man Marley" leitmotif from his score for Home Alone (1990) and quoted in Close Encounters of the Third Kind (1977) and Star Wars: Episode IV – A New Hope (1977) when Luke discovers that Imperial stormtroopers have killed his uncle and aunt.
- Hans Zimmer – "The Rightful King" from The Lion King soundtrack, "Rock House Jail" from The Rock soundtrack, and "House Atreides" from the 2021 Dune adaptation.
- Daniel Pemberton – "Time Go Fishing", as well as others, from Project Hail Mary (2026)
- KPop Demon Hunters – Your Idol (2025)
- D.Gray-man – The lyrics of the soundtrack Lacrimosa/Lala's Lullaby by Kaoru Wada (sung by Eri Kawai) are the lyrics of Lacrimosa. (2006)
- Debbie Wiseman – Shakespeare & Hathaway: Private Investigators main theme (2019)
