= Symphony No. 11 (Myaskovsky) =

The Russian composer Nikolai Myaskovsky wrote his Symphony No. 11 in B♭ minor in 1931/1932.

It has three movements:

1. Lento – Allegro agitato
2. Andante – Adagio, ma non tanto
3. Precipitato – Allegro

The symphony (his opus 34) was begun three years after his 10th symphony was completed, a symphonic pause long for him. The style of this symphony is entirely different from that of its predecessor, which was still a modern-sounding work. Symphony No. 11 sounds much more conservative. That is probably a consequence of the changing art climate in the Soviet Union, although the failure of the demanding 10th Symphony, poorly-performed by the conductorless orchestra Persimfans at its premiere, may also have contributed to his adoption of a less-advanced style.

Too modern art began to be considered "formalistic", and artists were brought together under one aegis. Another cause is possible, according to some Soviet musicologists – that Myaskovsky and others had to leave the poorly functioning Association for Contemporary Music. The work's premiere was also delayed until two years after completion. By then Myaskovsky had already tinkered with/revised the symphony. A musical pointer in this symphony is two fragments in movement 2, where woodwinds turn and turn again around a fugal motif.

The work was dedicated to Maximilian Steinberg, whose third symphony and a symphonic poem, Prinses Marlene, had earlier been converted by Myaskovsky into piano reduction.

The symphony was premiered on 16 January 1933 in Moscow, conducted by Konstantin Saradzhev.

== Sources ==
- Ikonnikov, Alexei (1969) [First published 1946]. Myaskovsky; his life and work. Greenwood Press. OCLC 52166.
- Rijen, Onno van. "Opus by Miaskovsky". Archived from the original on 13 May 2014.
