= Emil Cooper =

Russian and American conductor (1877–1960)

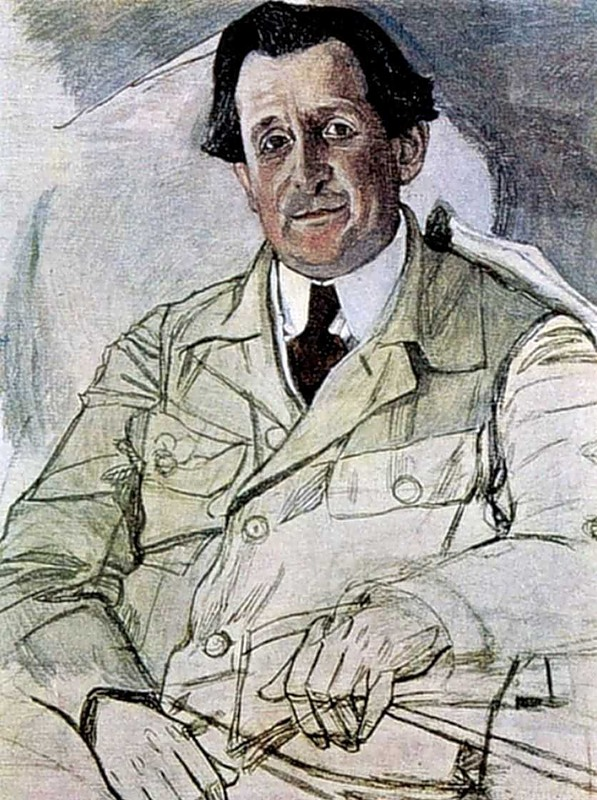
Portrait of Emil Cooper by Aleksandr Golovin. 1919.

Emil Albertovich Cooper (Russian: Эмиль Альбертович Купер, Russian pronunciation: [ɪˈmʲilʲ ɐlʲˈbʲɛrtɐvʲɪt͡ɕ ˈkupʲɪr]), also known as Emil Kuper (December 13 [OS December 1], 1877, Kherson, Russian Empire (now Ukraine) – November 16, 1960, New York) was a Russian conductor and violinist, of English ancestry.

== Biography ==
He graduated music school in Odessa as violinist and composer. Until 1898 he played recitals as violinist and learned conducting independently. He also studied conducting with Arthur Nikisch. In 1899, together with tenor Leonid Sobinov and bass Feodor Chaliapin, he toured Russian cities conducting opera. He conducted in many venues in Russia, Western Europe and the United States subsequently.

He premiered Rimsky-Korsakov's opera The Golden Cockerel in 1909; Reinhold Glière's epic Third Symphony, 'Ilya Murometz' on 23 March 1912, Myaskovsky's gloomy and turbulent Third Symphony on April of 1914. He also conducted Rimsky-Korsakov's Kashchey the Immortal in January 1917 at the Bolshoi Theatre in Moscow.

He emigrated to the West in 1924, and was a long-time staff conductor at the Metropolitan Opera in New York.

From 1944 until his death in 1960, Cooper conducted for Pauline Donalda's Opera Guild of Montreal.

Cultural offices
Preceded by Alexander Khessin	Musical directors, St Petersburg Philharmonic Orchestra; 1920–1923	Succeeded by Valery Berdyaev
Preceded by Teodors Reiters	Musical directors, Latvian National Opera; 1925–1928	Succeeded by Georg Schneevoigt
