= Nicolai Malko =

Russian and American conductor (1883–1961)

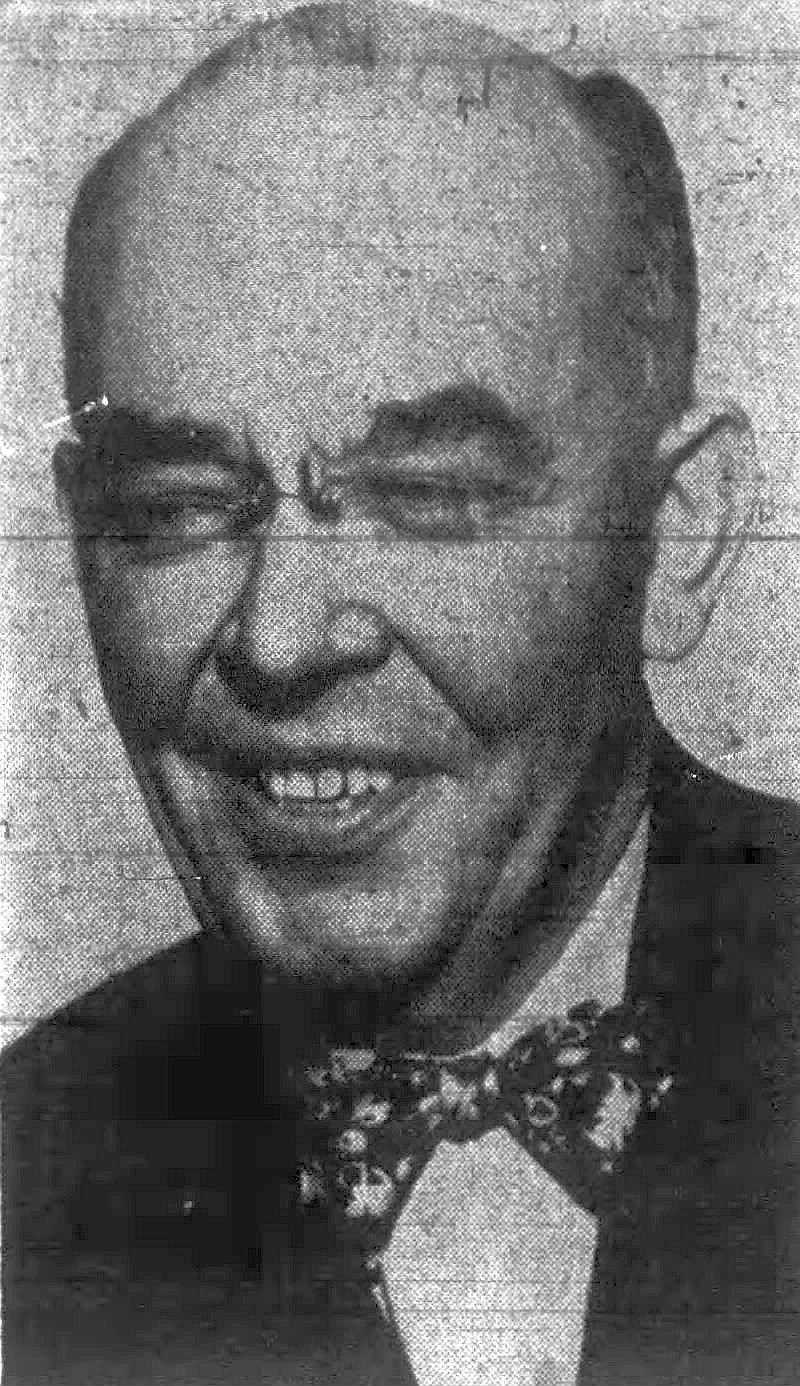
Nicolai Malko in 1946

Nicolai Andreyevich Malko (Russian: Никола́й Андре́евич Малько́, Ukrainian: Микола Андрійович Малько; 4 May 1883 – 23 June 1961) was a Russian-born American symphonic conductor.

== Biography ==
Malko was born in Brailov, Vinnitsky Uyezd, Podolian Governorate, Russian Empire (today part of Ukraine) to a Ukrainian father and Russian mother.

In 1906 he completed his studies in history and philology at the Saint Petersburg University. In 1909 he graduated from the Saint Petersburg Conservatory, where Rimsky-Korsakov, Glazunov and Lyadov were among his teachers. He published articles on music criticism in the Russian press and performed as a pianist and later a conductor. In 1909 he became a conductor at the Mariinsky Theatre, where he was promoted to head conductor six years later.

From 1909 he studied conducting in Munich under Felix Mottl. In 1918 he became the director of the conservatory in Vitebsk and from 1921 taught at the Moscow Conservatory. From 1921 to 1924 he shuttled between Vitebsk, Moscow, Kiev and Kharkov, conducting in each of these cities. In 1925 he became professor of the Leningrad Conservatory. He became conductor of the Leningrad Philharmonic Orchestra in 1926, where he conducted the world premiere of pupil Dmitri Shostakovich's Symphony No. 1 the same year, and of Symphony No. 2, dedicated to him, the next. Malko also conducted the premiere of Nikolai Myaskovsky's 5th Symphony, and was dedicatee of his 9th Symphony.

He was succeeded as director of the Leningrad Philharmonic by his pupil Alexander Gauk in 1928, and continued to teach at the Conservatory. In 1929, invited to appear in the West, he and his wife left the Soviet Union and did not return for thirty years, until a U.S. State Department-sanctioned invitation from the Soviet Ministry of Culture brought him back to conduct in Moscow, Leningrad, and Kyiv. During his years outside the Soviet Union, Malko lived in Vienna, Prague and Copenhagen, where he helped to establish the Danish Radio Symphony Orchestra, earning the title Permanent Guest Conductor.

While the outbreak of World War II in 1940, Malko settled in the United States, where he taught conducting. His thoughts on conducting technique were gathered together and published in a volume entitled The Conductor and his Baton (1950), the principles of which form an explicit basis for Elizabeth Green's more recent handbook, The Modern Conductor. From 1942 to 1946, he was music director of the Grand Rapids Symphony in Grand Rapids, Michigan, which was a community orchestra at the time.

Malko recorded extensively for EMI in Copenhagen and then with the Philharmonia, in London. In 1951 he premiered Vagn Holmboe's 7th Symphony with the Danish Radio Symphony Orchestra. From 1954 to 1956 he lived in Britain and was principal conductor of the Yorkshire Symphony Orchestra. Immediately after that, he moved to Australia, to take up the post of Chief Conductor of the Sydney Symphony Orchestra following the hurried departure of Sir Eugene Goossens. He remained in this position until his death in Sydney five years later.

A 4-CD box set featuring Malko conducting Tchaikovsky Symphony No.2, Shostakovich Symphony No.1, Haydn Symphony No.83, Mussorgsky Prelude to Khovanschina, Rimsky-Korsakov The Tsar's Bride & Symphonic Suite 'Antar', Bruckner Symphony No. 7 and Kodaly Szekelyfono 'The Spinning Room' is available from Lyrita (REAM.2120).

== Honours ==
He was a National Patron of Delta Omicron, an international professional music fraternity.

In 1960, the Danish King Frederik IX named Malko a Knight of the Order of Dannebrog.

== Sources ==
- Malko, Nicolai (1966). A Certain Art. Translated by Malko, George. New York City: William Morrow and Company.

Cultural offices
| Preceded by Valery Berdyaev | Musical Directors, St Petersburg Philharmonic Orchestra; 1926-1930 | Succeeded by Aleksandr Gauk |
| Preceded by Launy Grøndahl | Principal Conductors, Danish National Symphony Orchestra; 1930-1937 | Succeeded by Fritz Busch |
