= Symphony No. 20 (Myaskovsky) =

Nikolai Myaskovsky's Symphony No. 20 in E major, his Op. 50, was written in 1940. It is dedicated to Yuri Shaporin. The symphony was premiered on 28 November 1940 by Nikolai Golovanov conducting the Large All-Union Radio SO. It has three movements:

1. Allegro con spirito (ca. 8 minutes)
2. Adagio, in C major (ca. 9 minutes, initial tempo quarter note = 52)
3. Allegro inquieto, in E minor (ca. 10 minutes, initial tempo half note = 104)

The first movement is in sonata form. The Adagio is on two themes, in C and in A♭, which appear contrapuntally at the reappearance of the first; it has the form A–B (l'Istesso tempo, Andantino)–A'–B'–coda. The finale is a rondo whose E major concluding pages incorporate a climactic reappearance by the main theme of the Adagio, leading Richard Taruskin to remark of this symphony that it is Myaskovsky's "Land of Hope and Glory".

== Recordings ==
- Yevgeny Svetlanov, Russian Federation Academic Symphony Orchestra, 1991-3 recordings appearing variously on Russian Disc, Olympia OCD 739, and Warner CDs
