= Symphony No. 22 (Myaskovsky) =

Nikolai Myaskovsky composed his Symphony No. 22 in B minor in 1941. Its official name is Symphonic Ballad (or Ballade), and it lasts about 35–40 minutes in performance.

The symphony is in one movement in three sections:

1. Lento. Allegro non troppo in B minor
2. Andante con duolo in B♭ minor
3. Allegro energico, ma non troppo vivo in B minor

The first section begins with a slow introduction which acts as a section-connecting and recurring motive, in B minor but with a tendency to slip to a G major chord. When this introductory material is last heard, near the end of the symphony, the top G rises to a G♯ several times.

The symphony was premiered in Tbilisi under Abram Stasevich on 12 January 1942. It was possibly among the first symphonic responses to The Great Patriotic War (World War II), predating Dmitri Shostakovich's Leningrad Symphony.

== Recordings ==
- Yevgeny Svetlanov, USSR State Symphony Orchestra, recorded May 2, 1970, for Melodiya, reissued on Olympia, Alto and Warner Classics
- Aleksandr Titov, St Petersburg State Academic SO, on Northern Flowers NF/PMA 9966, recorded June 24, 2008
