= Symphony No. 1 (Myaskovsky) =

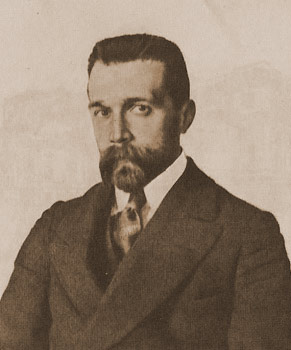
Nikolai Myaskovsky in 1912

The Symphony No. 1 in C minor, Op. 3, by Nikolai Myaskovsky was written in 1908 (and revised 1921).

It is in three movements:

1. Lento, ma non troppo. Allegro.
2. Larghetto, quasi andante
3. Allegro assai e molto risoluto

The first sketches for this symphony were written at the time of Myaskovsky's studies in Saint Petersburg in February 1908. The following summer he wrote the piano score, and on the first, ninth and twenty-seventh of July, the movements were finished in piano reduction. In September he finished the orchestration. In this early period of his composition, Myaskovsky noticed his talent and enthusiasm for the symphony as a genre, but he didn't have the heart to show his work to his teacher for composition, Anatoly Lyadov. So he showed it, along with his friend and fellow student Sergei Prokofiev, to Alexander Glazunov, who granted him a scholarship immediately. In 1921 Myaskovsky revised the symphony and published this revised version in 1929. In 1931 a version for piano four-hands was published.

== Analysis ==
The music and the character of the early symphonies of Myaskovsky look back to the Russian Romantics like Tchaikovsky, Glazunov or Taneyev. Myaskovsky also tried to be open to modern influences, but his music wasn't modern enough for the contemporary Russian composers since his focus was on melody and voice-leading as he had learned from Nikolai Rimsky-Korsakov. The first symphony has many attributes which are characteristic for Myaskovsky's symphonies: The expansive exposition and variation of the themes, the use of polyphony and counterpoint and of course the preference for minor scales and sonata form. The outer movements are in C minor, the second is in A-flat major.

== Reception and criticism ==
When Myaskovsky showed the sketches of the first symphony to Prokofiev, Prokofiev was appalled at some parts. In the last movement Myaskovsky had entwined four themes at one point and Prokofiev asked him why he did so: "For Lyadov's counterpoint-hours?". In the revised publication these bars are missing, the composer shortened the first and third movements and changed the instrumentation. The completion of the symphony had a bad effect on Myaskovsky: in the immediately following time he was very depressive, and it took a few months before he composed another symphonic work, the symphonic poem "Silence" (after Edgar Allan Poe). Boris Asafyev said about this symphony, that it reminded him of Mussorgsky's song cycle Sunless. The first performance on June 2 (o.s., May 20), 1914, in Pavlovsk was conducted by A. P. Aslanov; the conductor was thrilled by the music and asked for the score of the third symphony later. The Polish conductor Grzegorz Fitelberg asked for the score in 1914 and Myaskovsky was very happy to receive this request, since he was fighting on the front in the First World War at that time.

== Sources ==
- Soja Gulinskaja: Nikolai Jakowlewitsch Mjaskowski. Moscow 1981, German version Berlin 1985
