= Symphony No. 8 (Myaskovsky) =

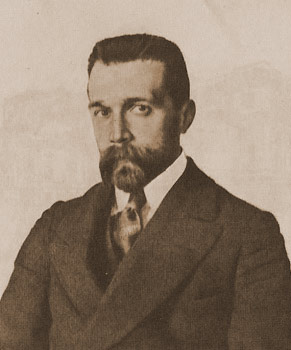
Nikolai Myaskovsky in 1912

Nikolai Myaskovsky wrote his Symphony No. 8 in A major, his Opus 26, between 1924 and 1925.

The symphony is his second in the major - the first is his fifth symphony - and the premiere was conducted by Konstantin Saradzhev, who had premiered the composer's fourth and seventh symphonies. It is dedicated to Sergei S. Popov.

It is in four movements:

1. Andante – Allegro in F♯ minor and A major
2. Allegro risoluto e con spirito in D major
3. Adagio in B minor
4. Allegro deciso in A major

== Recordings ==
- Robert Stankovsky with the Czecho-Slovak Radio Symphony Orchestra of Bratislava on Marco Polo Records 8.223297, 1991.
- Evgeny Svetlanov with the Russian Federation Academic Symphony Orchestra on Alto, also released on Warner.

== Sources ==
- Rijen, Onno van. "Opus by Miaskovsky". Archived from the original on 13 May 2014.
