= Elizabeth A. H. Green =

American violinist, conductor, and music educator (1906-1995)

Elizabeth Adine Herkimer Green (August 21, 1906 – September 24, 1995) was an American violinist, conductor, and music educator. She was widely regarded as one of the most influential string teachers and conducting pedagogues in the United States.

== Early life and education ==
Green was born in Mobile, Alabama in 1905 to Albert Wingate Green and Mary Elizabeth Timmerman. In 1908, the Green family moved to Blue Island, Illinois, so Albert Green could assume the role of Director of the Violin Department of Ferry Hall at Lake Forest University.

During the summer of 1919, the Green family relocated to Wheaton, Illinois, where her father accepted a faculty position as instructor of Violin and Orchestral Work at the Wheaton College Music Conservatory.

During her secondary education at Wheaton Academy and Wheaton High School, Green found the music curriculum insufficient for her abilities. She received permission to attend classes at Wheaton College's Music Conservatory during study breaks while continuing violin studies under her father's tutelage. This arrangement allowed her to simultaneously complete music requirements for a Bachelor of Music degree while attending high school. By her graduation from Wheaton High School in 1924, Green had fulfilled the Bachelor of Music degree requirements at Wheaton College, including applied lessons in violin and cello, ensemble participation, music theory, counterpoint, and music history.

After completing high school, Green pursued a Bachelor of Science degree, majoring in philosophy with minors in physics and French to fulfill her remaining general education requirements. While she participated in Wheaton College's 1924 commencement exercises, her degree with teaching licensure was not officially awarded until she completed all academic requirements in 1928.

After graduation, Green moved to Waterloo, Iowa, where she taught in the public schools for 14 years and also co-founded the Waterloo Symphony Orchestra. Green served as concertmaster of the Waterloo Symphony for five years before leaving Iowa for new position in Michigan. While teaching in Waterloo, Green traveled monthly to Chicago for lessons with conductor Nicolai Malko.

In 1939, Green earned a master's degree in music from Northwestern University. Her formative studies included violin with Jacques Gordon (concertmaster of the Chicago Symphony Orchestra) and viola with Clarence Evans (the CSO's principal violist). Green also studied violin with Ivan Galamian.

== Career ==
Elizabeth Green joined the University of Michigan faculty in 1942, initially hired to oversee orchestra programs in Ann Arbor public schools through a joint teaching position between the district and university. She began as a one-tenth-time instructor of music in October 1942, though she didn't teach in the School of Music until 1944.

Green was appointed concertmaster of the Ann Arbor Symphony Orchestra in 1942 and held the post for 20 years.

During her early years at Michigan, Green taught "School Orchestra Materials" during summer sessions. Her teaching responsibilities gradually increased from one-eighth-time to one-fourth-time in spring 1946. By 1948, she secured a three-year appointment as a half-time assistant professor of Music Education, transitioning to a full-time position that fall.

Green's academic career progressed through several promotions approved by the University of Michigan Board of Regents: from Assistant Professor to Associate Professor (effective fall 1958) and later from Associate Professor to Professor of Music (effective fall 1963). Green taught at Michigan for 32 years, retiring in 1974 and receiving professor emeritus status in 1975.

== Pedagogy ==
Green authored several books throughout her career. She wrote Miraculous Teacher, a biography of violinist Ivan Galamian, and collaborated with Galamian on the publication of Principles of Violin Playing and Teaching.

== Recognition and legacy ==
In 1995, the Michigan House of Representatives adopted a resolution recognizing Green as a "world famous educator, musician, conductor, and author."

The American String Teachers Association annually presents the Elizabeth A. H. Green School Educator Award, honoring a string teacher with an outstanding career in school orchestra education. The award was first presented in 1990.

== Later life ==
Green was diagnosed with cancer in June 1995. She died on September 24, 1995, at the age of 89.

In March 1996, the Ann Arbor Public Schools Music Department honored Green with a concert at Hill Auditorium featuring more than 500 student performers.
