= Spira mirabilis (orchestra) =

Spira mirabilis is a project, a space created to stop the fast routine of making concerts with little time for rehearsing. Its main goal is studying and spending time to learn as much as possible about each score and its structure and language, with the intention of a common, collective interpretation.

Spira mirabilis is mostly based in the town of Formigine in Italy, but had residencies also in Germany, UK, Switzerland, France and Poland. The name takes inspiration from the Spira mirabilis ("the marvelous spiral") of the 17th-century Swiss mathematician Jacob Bernoulli, who called the mathematical curve (present under many guises in nature) logarithmic spiral for its property of self-similarity.

Coming from this, Spira mirabilis has no fixed set-up, but it answers to what the chosen score asks for: it can be a quintet, an octet, a small group of winds or strings up to a full symphonic orchestra with choir and soloists. No matter what the set-up is, the method, the rules and the common wish stays the same. A part of the repertoire is studied and played on period instruments.

Spira mirabilis is also distinguished, among other things, by the fact that interpretations are worked out, rehearsed and performed collectively without a conductor and so implement a model of music making, which breaks to some extent with prevailing patterns.

In 2012 Spira mirabilis has been appointed as Cultural Ambassador of Europe by EACEA, the Executive Agency of the European Union.

Spira mirabilis performed orchestral works by Bach, Haydn, Mozart, Beethoven, Mendelssohn, Schubert, Schumann, Brahms, Dvořák, Stravinsky, Ravel and chamber music by Mozart, Schubert, Schoenberg, Bartók, Beethoven and Tomasi.
