= Violin Sonata No. 2 (Ysaÿe) =

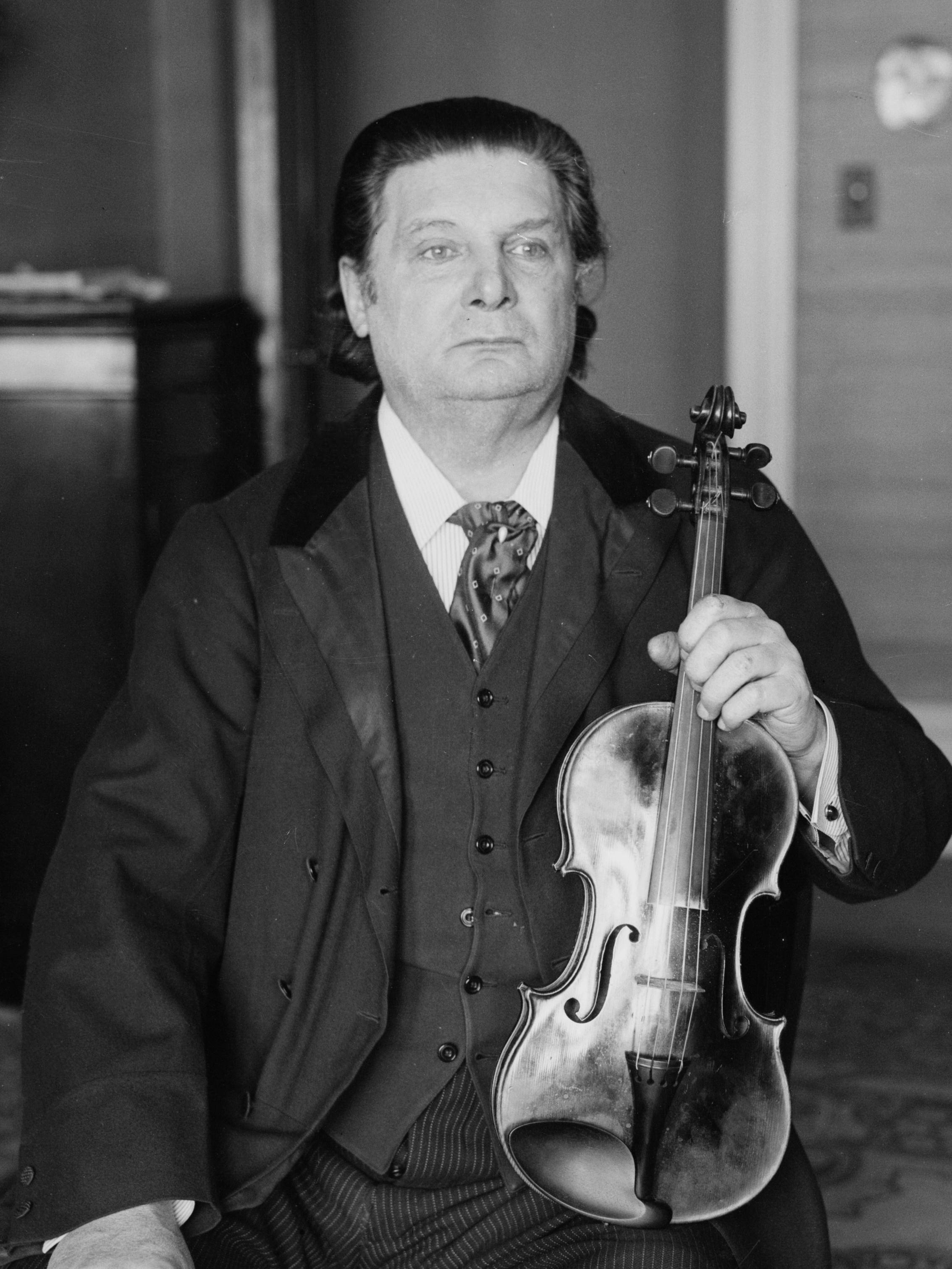
Eugène Ysaÿe, around 1915

The Sonata for Solo Violin "Jacques Thibaud", Op. 27, No. 2 is a sonata in four movements from Six sonatas for solo violin by Eugène Ysaÿe, each one dedicated to one of Ysaÿe's contemporary violinists.

== Characteristics of the "Thibaud" sonata ==
There are four movements:

1. Obsession; Prelude
2. Malinconia
3. Danse des Ombres; Sarabande
4. Les furies

Sonata No. 2 was dedicated to Jacques Thibaud, a friend of Eugène Ysaÿe's. The fact that Thibaud had lived in Ysaÿe's home, and the fact that Ysaÿe once lent his Guarnerius and Stradivarius to Thibaud when Thibaud's violin adjustment was not ready for concert, show Ysaÿe's admiration for his friend. This sonata greatly resembles the style of Johann Sebastian Bach, and includes direct quotations of his music within.

=== I. Obsession – Prelude: Poco vivace ===
At the very beginning of the movement, Ysaÿe directly quotes the beginning of Prelude from J.S. Bach's Partita No. 3 in E major for solo violin. Much like Bach's E major Prelude, the movement consists of virtuosic sixteenth notes throughout, yet Ysaÿe's use of chromatic tonality clearly sets the piece in the genre of early 20th century music. Direct quotes from Bach's Prelude appear frequently, showing Ysaÿe's "obsession" with Bach's work. Another prominent theme is the "Dies Irae", a plainchant from the Catholic Mass for the Dead. Ysaÿe often employed his own symbols to indicate specific directions to players; for example, in the 74th bar of this movement, he uses one of his symbols over the first note of each beat to indicate that these notes should be played by the whole bow.

=== II. Malinconia – Poco lento ===
The Malinconia contrapuntally resembles the style of Bach, perhaps most of any of the movements of the second sonata. It employs the siciliano rhythm, found in the first solo sonata for violin by Bach. It specifies the violinist to play with a mute, to dampen the tone and volume, something fairly unusual for a solo sonata. The Dies irae is not stated within the movement until the final few bars, where it is played uninterrupted on top of a drone.

=== III. Danse des ombres – Sarabande (Lento) ===
The sarabande is based on a theme-and-variation pattern. The theme itself is again a variation of Dies irae. In the first few bars, the theme is played with pizzicato, making it sound as if played by guitar or lute. The movement consists of six variations, and each variation develops gradually to the end. In the first variation, for example, Ysaÿe instructs the player not to use vibrato, in order to maintain a simple tone. The last variation is composed of technically demanding thirty-second notes, all played forte. Then, the theme is repeated, but this time, it is played with the bow.

=== IV. Les Furies – Allegro furioso ===
The Dies Irae melody appears recurrently throughout the movement. Some of the Dies Irae figures are played sul ponticello, for instance in measures 41 and 58.

== Bibliography ==
- Hoaston, Karen D. Culmination of the Belgian Violin Tradition—The Innovative Style of Eugène Ysaÿe. 1999.
- Martens, Frederick H. Violin Mastery – Talks with Master Violinists and /teachers. New York: Frederick A. Stokes, Co.,1919.
- Ysaye, Antoine. Ysaye, by his son Antoine. England: W.E.Hill and Sons, 1980.
