= Aleksey Kozlovsky =

Soviet composer, conductor, folklorist, and academic

- Алексе́й Козло́вский
- Born: Aleksey Fedorovich Kozlovsky; 15 October [O.S. 2 October] 1905; Kiev, Kiev Governorate, Russian Empire
- Died: 9 January 1977 (aged 71); Tashkent, Uzbek SSR, Soviet Union
- Occupations: composer, conductor

Aleksey Fedorovich Kozlovsky (Russian: Алексе́й Фёдорович Козло́вский; 15 October [O.S. 2 October] 1905, Kiev – 9 January 1977, Tashkent) was a Soviet composer, conductor, folklorist, and academic. He was a collector of Uzbek and Karakalpak folk music which he synthesized with European music traditions in his own compositions. His most well-known works are Ferganskaya syuita Lola and the vocal-symphonic poem Tanovar; the latter of which is based on the Uzbek folk song Kora soch.

== Biography and creative activity ==
"The son of a gymnasium teacher, Anton Fedorovich Kozlovsky, was the great-grandson of the Polish cellist Anton Shimansky. In 1923, he moved to Moscow and studied under B. L. Yavorsky at the First State Music Technicum, which Yavorsky had founded. In 1931, he graduated from the Moscow Conservatory in the composition class of N.Y. Myaskovsky and studied counterpoint and strict style under N. S. Zhilyayev, and instrumentation under S.N. Vasilenko. His graduation work was the 'Heroic Overture' for a symphony orchestra. Influenced by the art of V. I. Suk, he also studied conducting for three years under A. B. Hessin.

From 1931 to 1933, he worked as a conductor at the K. S. Stanislavsky Opera Theater. In 1936, he was exiled to Tashkent for three years. He became fascinated with Eastern culture and remained in Tashkent until the end of his life. From 1938 to 1941, he served as a conductor at the Uzbek Theater of Opera and Ballet, and from 1949 to 1963, he was the chief conductor and artistic director of the Symphony Orchestra of the Uzbek Philharmonic. Starting from 1943, he taught at the Tashkent Conservatory, becoming a professor of composition and conducting in 1957. He also served as the head of the composition department from 1949 to 1954 and in 1962, and from 1972 onwards, he taught instrumentation.

Some of his major works include the opera 'Ulugbek' (in versions from 1942 and 1958, both staged in Tashkent) and the symphonic poem 'Tanovar' (based on the theme of a love song recorded in several versions by Kh. Nasirova), which inspired the ballet of the same name (premiered in 1971 in Tashkent). The plot of the opera is based on the life events of the Central Asian astronomer Ulugbek, and its creation coincided with the discovery of Ulugbek's tomb in Samarkand (Gur-e-Amir); the set designer was Usto Mumin.

During the Great Patriotic War, A. F. Kozlovsky's circle of acquaintances included many artists and musicians evacuated from Moscow and Leningrad, including F. G. Ranevskaya and M. O. Shteynberg. In Tashkent, Kozlovsky met Anna Akhmatova, with whom he maintained a creative and friendly relationship until the end of her life. The composer wrote several romances based on her poems. Anna Akhmatova dedicated a poem titled "The Appearance of the Moon" from the cycle "The Moon at Zenith" (1944) to Kozlovsky.

According to the musicologist N. Yudin, Kozlovsky as a conductor was particularly close to works of a lyrical-romantic and lyrical-tragic nature, such as those of Franck, Scriabin, and Tchaikovsky. It is in these works that the elevated lyricism characteristic of Kozlovsky's individuality is revealed. The breadth of melodic breath, the organic development, the figurative relief, and sometimes pictorial qualities are the characteristics that distinguish the conductor's interpretation.

His wife, Galina Longinovna Kozlovskaya (nee Herus; 1906–1991), was the daughter of the deputy of the Second State Duma, L. F. Herus. She authored the librettos for A. F. Kozlovsky's stage works and was a memoirist.

He died on 9 January 1977. He is buried in the Botkin Cemetery in Tashkent. The composer's archive has been transferred to the M. I. Glinka Museum of Musical Culture in Moscow.

On October 15, 2015, a conference dedicated to the 110th anniversary of A. F. Kozlovsky's birth occurred at the Russian Center for Science and Culture in Tashkent"

== Awards ==
- Order of Lenin (18 March 1959)
- Order of the "Badge of Honor (including 6 December 1951)
- Honored Artist of the Uzbek SSR (1955)
- Honored worker of art of the Uzbek SSR (1944)

== Literatures ==
- Kozlovsky, Alexey Fyodorovich // Great Soviet Encyclopedia. — Moscow: Sov. Encyclopedia, 1969—1978.
- Kozlovsky, Alexey Fyodorovich // Musical Encyclopedia. Vol. 2, 1974. Columns 860—861.
- Vyzgo T. S. Alexey Kozlovsky. — Moscow, 1966.
- Contemporary Conductors / compiled by L. Grigoriev and Ya. Platek. — Moscow, 1969.
- Alexey and Galina Kozlovsky: A Conversation with V. D. Duvakin // Anna Akhmatova in the recordings of Duvakin: Anthology / compiled by O. Figurnova. — Moscow: Natalis, 1999. — ISBN 5-8062-0008-6.
- Kozlovskaya G. Forty Years in the Sunny Land // Kozlovskaya G. Scheherazade: a thousand and one memories. Moscow: AST, 2015. P. 65—168. — ISBN 978-5-17-090999-5.
