= Symphony No. 13 (Myaskovsky) =

The Symphony No. 13 in B-flat minor, Op. 36 by Nikolai Myaskovsky was composed in 1933.

It is in one movement in three sections:

1. Andante moderato
2. Agitato molto e tenebroso
3. Andante nostalgico

According to Soya Gulinskaya, who quotes a letter from Frederick Stock accepting the dedication, the symphony was dedicated - apparently after its premiere - to Frederick Stock, a champion of Myaskovsky's music who later commissioned the 21st Symphony.

My dear Mr. Miaskowsky,

I have not yet replied to your kind letter of March 29 th . I wish to say that I greatly admire you for the splendid work you are doing as a composer of excellent music. I feel that the time will come when your symphonies will be just as well known as any of those by Tchaikovsky or any of your predecessors.

I accept with gratitude the dedication of your Thirteenth Symphony and shall repeat this and several of your major works on my programs in Chicago as well as on tour during the coming year.

Our mutual friend Prokofieff joins me in my highest estimation and admiration of your genius and I hope it will be possible for me before long to pay you a visit in Moscow so that I may have the pleasure of a personal acquaintance with you.

In the meantime, I am, with renewed expressions of highest esteem and most cordial greetings,

very sincerely yours, Frederick A. Stock

Letter to Myaskovsky dated June 7, 1935

The premiere was given in Chicago by Stock on 15 November 1933. The Soviet premiere was on 26 November 1933, conducted by Leo Ginzburg. The bleak and difficult music met a mediocre reception, and the score was not printed until 1945. It received possibly its first performance in recent times on 9 November 1994 in a BBC Radio 3 broadcast from the BBC National Orchestra of Wales conducted by Tadaaki Otaka.

Its central section contains a fugato in B minor, and "peters out" with quiet B♭ minor dissonant chords.

It is among Myaskovsky's more dissonant compositions.

The symphony lasts about 20 minutes in performance. It was not published until 1945.

== Recordings ==
- Evgeny Svetlanov, Russian Academic Federation Symphony Orchestra (Russian Disc, Melodiya, Olympia OCD 733, Warner) (recorded between 1991 and 1993)
