= Persimfans =

Persimfans was a conductorless orchestra in Moscow in the Soviet Union that was founded by Lev Tseitlin (or Zeitlin) and existed between 1922 and 1932. Its name is an abbreviation for Pervïy Simfonicheskiy Ansambl' bez Dirizhyora (First Symphony Ensemble without Conductor). Other orchestras were organized following its example, both in the USSR and abroad.

== Origins ==
Lev Zeitlin was concertmaster in Serge Koussevitzky’s orchestra (1908–1917); after this disbanded in 1920 he became a professor at the Moscow Conservatory, also playing with colleagues at the Bolshoi Theater. In 1922, influenced by the Bolshevik idea of collective labour, he proposed the creation of an orchestra that would work without a conductor, relying on the creative initiative of each of the musicians. Rehearsals took place around the musicians’ full-time work – early in the morning, during lunch breaks, etc – and concerts on Mondays, because this was when the theatre was closed.

Persimfans reflected the ideals of the Soviet Union at the time. Major decisions were undertaken by committees and all members of the orchestra had to be familiar with the entire score. Rehearsals were organised in chamber-ensemble style, first in sections and then with the entire orchestra. As a result, the orchestra was sometimes claimed to be ‘the only truly communist organisation in the USSR’. The orchestra generally numbered around 90 musicians, although exceptionally it could field larger groups: for its 10th anniversary in 1932, a concert called ‘’Celebration of Orchestral Labour’’ was performed by 150 musicians.

This approach to musical decisions required more time to be invested in rehearsals. For the first concert, 15 rehearsals were held, but as familiarity grew the number of rehearsals for a program was reduced.

The musicians were arranged in an ellipse, so that many of the musicians sat with their backs to the audience, unlike traditional orchestras. The wind instruments were in the centre, the string instruments were at the front of the stage, and the bass instruments (providing the foundation of the music) arranged at the back where they could be clearly seen by all the other musicians. The absence of a conductor was partly compensated for by the concertmaster being able to give clear cues to all the players; some accounts suggest he might sometimes have been seated on a raised platform for greater visibility.

The first concert took place on February 13, 1922, in Moscow's ‘’House of Unions’’ and was repeated on February 20 in Great Hall of the Moscow Conservatory.] The substantial Beethoven program included the Third (Eroica) Symphony, the Violin Concerto, and the "Egmont" Overture.

The orchestra's third concert did not take place until June 19, 1922, a programme of works by Tchaikovsky, which was followed by five more concerts that month. The orchestra's first season, September 1922 to Jun 1923, saw the ensemble perform some 80 concerts; and by the end of the next season the orchestra had given more than 100 concerts. The 1925–26 season ended with the 150th concert. Although many of the orchestra's concerts were given in formal concert venues such as the conservatory hall, they frequently performed also in cafes, cinemas, cultural centres, as well as "factories, workers' clubs, and military units". In these concerts Persimfans aimed to engage its predominantly working-class audience, many unfamiliar with ‘serious’ music’, by offering selections by a single composer "preceded by a crude Marxist sociology of the composer and his times and followed by discussions and questionnaires".

== The orchestra's philosophy ==
Between 1926 and 1929, the ensemble published a journal with a circulation of 1,700 copies, containing information about their programmes but also about wider musical issues. The magazine also reported the results of audience surveys, a novelty at that time.

The magazine expounded the Persimfans philosophy:

While recognizing that the decisive moment is a thorough preliminary study of the work, Persimfans denies the infallibility and indivisibility of the conductor's power, denies the need for him at the moment of performance, when the work has already been learned and prepared for performance.

Persimfans was the first to expand the scope of this issue, placing it on a principled basis and asserting that the complete depersonalization of orchestra members, which has become quite commonplace and leads to the fact that each of them is interested only in his own part and does not know (and has no desire to know) the work as a whole, is an absolutely harmful phenomenon in the everyday sense, which should no longer have a place.

Initially, the ensemble's repertoire was mostly familiar works of classical music, but gradually its programmes came to include a significant number of works by contemporary composers.

== Reactions ==
After the first concert, Sabaneev wrote in "Theatre Moscow":

Being 'conductorless' pulled the orchestra up, made it understand that in the orchestra, as in any ensemble, there are no secondary parts, that all are important. I believe this is the enormous artistic significance of this performance. Such an orchestra plays a well-known piece without a conductor undoubtedly better than with an average or bad conductor. Assessing phenomena from the point of view of their economy, one cannot help but admit that the conductor is the most important "economizing factor" that allows one to achieve good performance with a comparatively small expenditure of performance energy. Fifteen rehearsals to play a famous program from Beethoven...

Otto Klemperer joked, after a performance of Tchaikovsky's Sixth Symphony by Persimfans, "if things continue like this, we conductors will soon have to look for another calling."

Darius Milhaud, who visited the USSR on tour in the spring of 1926, recalled in his memoirs that the orchestra was a complete success, but it was only an experiment based on a political idea: "A conductor would undoubtedly have achieved the same results and, one must assume, much faster.”

Sergei Prokofiev was invited back from exile abroad to play two concerts with Persimfans in January 1927. The programmes included his 3rd Piano Concerto and selections from the Classical symphony. Of the rehearsals he wrote: “The rehearsal is led by Zeitlin. In front of him, on the music stand, is not the first violin part, but the full score, into which from time to time his neighbours also peep. Sometimes the second trombone or the first horn stands up and says, ‘Comrades! Here we must do this, that, or the other…’ Just the same, the rehearsal proceeds smoothly and agreeably…. Without a conductor the orchestra took much more trouble and worked harder than it would with one; a conductor would have to battle with passages of technical difficulty and ask for important voices to be brought out. Here the players are very conscientious, play by nature musically and with great concentration; all dynamics and nuances are precisely observed. No question of learning their parts at the rehearsal; they prepare the most difficult passages at home beforehand. On the other hand, problems arise: a ritardando, for example, which with a conductor will come about quite unproblematically, may take them a good twenty minutes to straighten out, because every player slows down in his own way.”

Of the concert he said: "The orchestra coped excellently with the difficult program and accompanied as if under a conductor. The passages requiring ritardando and accelerando were difficult... The complicated passages were mastered all the better – here everyone felt like a soloist and played precisely." Elsewhere in his diary he recorded: “The orchestra has a beautiful balanced sonority. Each orchestral musician honestly plays all the notes, and therefore everything sounds and comes out exactly as the composer intended. It's not like those annoying hired hands who only pretend to blow into their instrument, but in reality miss half the notes."

On April 2, 1928, Persimfans presented the premiere of Nikolai Myaskovsky's 10th Symphony. The composer, however, was concerned by obvious coordination problems within the orchestra, and the symphony met a lukewarm response.

== Decline and disbanding ==
Lunacharsky as Minister for Education was the leading figure in defining cultural policy during the 1920s. In charge of Narkompros (the People's Commissariat for Education), he was the orchestra's principal champion among the political leadership. On the orchestra's 5th anniversary in 1927, he awarded the ensemble the honorary title of Honoured Collective of the Republic, together with a large cash prize. But by this time leadership of cultural policy was slipping away from Lunacharsky. Trotsky’s fall from favour created further difficulties, as his sister Olga Kameneva was head of the "Society of Friends of Persimfans". In 1928, Zeitlin gave up his role of chairman of the orchestra, and in 1929 Lunacharsky was dismissed. By this time too the prevailing state ideology was moving away from the ideal of a leaderless collective, and when the introduction of the 5-day working week disrupted the ensemble's rehearsal schedule, the musicians decided to disband the ensemble. Although the orchestra is usually said to have disbanded in 1932, some sources claim that the last concert by Persimfans took place on December 12, 1933.

== Legacy ==
Persimfans inspired the formation of other conductorless orchestras throughout the Soviet Union and the West in the 1920s, but most only lasted for a few years.

In her memoir of Mikhail Bulgakov, his second wife Lyubov Belozerskaia-Bulgakova recalls that they went to listen to Persimfans several times, and subsequently in his story "Diaboliad" Bulgakov created a character named Henrietta Potapovna Persimfans.

More generally, the word Persimfans acquired a negative, ironic meaning in the Russian language as a symbol of anarchy and inconsistency.

== Contemporary Revival ==
In 2008, a contemporary revival of Persimfans was created by Konstantin Dudalov-Kashuro, Peter Aidu and Gregory Krotenko under the aegis of the Moscow School of Dramatic Art's Music Laboratory. In 2014 Persimfans was awarded the Sergei Kuryokhin Contemporary Art Award.
