= Symphony No. 5 (Myaskovsky) =

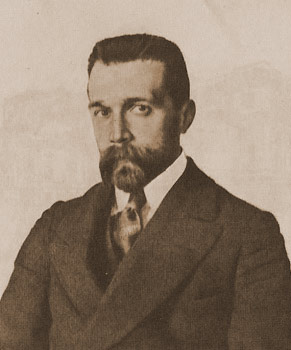
Nikolai Myaskovsky in 1912

Nikolai Myaskovsky's Symphony No. 5 in D major, Op. 18, was written in 1918. It was premiered on 18 August 1920 by the conductor Nikolai Malko.

== Background ==
The plans for what would become the Fifth Symphony were first laid out in 1914, around the time of the completion of the Third Symphony. The interruption of Myaskovsky's service and eventual injury on the Eastern Front of World War I meant that work on the symphony would not begin in earnest until late February 1918, soon after work was completed on the Fourth Symphony. In contrast to the wartime turbulence of the three-movement Fourth Symphony, Myaskovsky intended the Fifth Symphony to be more serene in nature, while using the more traditional four-movement symphonic structure. Despite the differences between the two symphonies, Myaskovsky's experiences during the war would nevertheless provide him the themes for the Fifth. He later recalled:

Actually, the majority of the themes of the Fifth Symphony occurred to me during the war in the most varied circumstances, which were mostly peaceful enough, although in the zone of the front. The opening theme of the first movement came to me in a fir wood near the fort of Przemyśl in 1915. The themes of the scherzo originated near Dvinsk in 1916, while the themes of the finale came to me in urban surroundings in 1917, while I was at Revel

Myaskovsky finished writing the symphony in early April 1918, though the orchestration would not be complete until late 1919. It was premiered under the baton of Nikolai Malko in the Hall of Mirrors at the Hermitage Gardens in Moscow.

== Music ==
The symphony contains four movements:

1. Allegretto amabile
2. Lento (quasi Andante)
3. Allegro burlando
4. Allegro risoluto e con brio

The symphony is scored for a piccolo, two flutes, two clarinets, a bass clarinet, two oboes, a cor anglais, two bassoons, a contrabassoon, three trumpets, six horns, three trombones, timpani, cymbals, a tuba, and strings.

== Reception ==
Upon its premiere, the Fifth Symphony gained quick popular and critical acclaim, with much praise being given to its pastoral atmosphere and folk-like themes. The piece became a lasting part of Malko's repertoire, who conducted it throughout his career. The symphony was not as well received by other Russian composers, however, with Sergei Prokofiev ultimately calling it "insipid, inept, old, and without the least direction in sound" and comparing the finale to "some sort of hopeless Glazunov!"

== Recordings ==
Some of the conductors who have recorded this symphony include Konstantin Ivanov and Yevgeny Svetlanov (forming his complete recordings of all the composer's symphonies).
