= Symphony No. 6 (Myaskovsky) =

1923 symphony with choral finale by Nikolai Myaskovsky

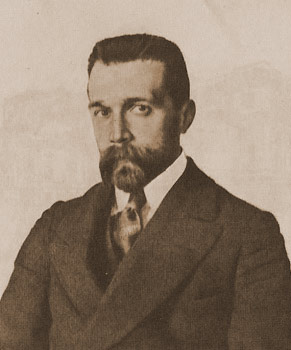
Nikolai Myaskovsky in 1912

The Symphony No. 6 in E♭ minor, Op. 23 by Nikolai Myaskovsky was composed between 1921 and 1923. It is the largest and most ambitious of his 27 symphonies, and uses a chorus in the finale. It has been described as "probably the most significant Russian symphony between Tchaikovsky's Pathétique and the Fourth Symphony of Shostakovich". The premiere took place at the Bolshoi Theatre, Moscow on 4 May 1924, conducted by Nikolai Golovanov and was a notable success. The symphony was as successful abroad, being heard across Europe and America; it was programmed annually for 17 seasons by Frederick Stock in Chicago.

The descending chordal theme with which the symphony begins came to Myaskovsky while he attended a mass rally in which he heard the Soviet Procurator Nikolai Krylenko conclude his speech with the call "Death, death to the enemies of the revolution!" The composer was also affected by the deaths of his father, his close friend Alexander Revidzev, and his aunt Yelikonida Konstantinovna Myaskovskaya; he was especially shaken by seeing his aunt's body in an empty Petrograd flat during winter 1920. In 1919 the painter Boris Lopatinsky, who had been living in Paris, sang Myaskovsky some French Revolutionary songs which were still current among Parisian workers; some would later be incorporated into the symphony's finale. He was also influenced by Les Aubes (The Dawns), a verse drama by the Belgian writer Emile Verhaeren, which enacted the death of a revolutionary hero and his funeral.

== Musical analysis ==
The symphony is scored for 3 flutes (3rd doubling piccolo), 3 oboes, cor anglais, 2 clarinets, bass clarinet, 3 bassoons, contrabassoon, 6 horns, 3 trumpets, 3 trombones, tuba, timpani, cymbals, bass drum, side drum, celesta, harp, strings and mixed chorus. It has four movements:

1. Poco largamente – Allegro feroce – a large and turbulent sonata-allegro)
2. Presto tenebroso – a scherzo with an Andante moderato trio
3. Andante appassionato – a romantic slow movement
4. Allegro vivace – Più sostenuto – Andante molto espressivo – an episodic finale beginning with a bright E♭ major fantasia on the French revolutionary songs Ah! ça ira and Carmagnole then turning to a dark C minor with the Dies Irae. A clarinet introduces the melody of a Russian Orthodox burial hymn, 'How the Soul Parted from the Body' (Shto mui vidyeli? – 'What did we see? A miraculous wonder, a dead body ...'). The chorus enters with wailing cries that punctuate a setting of the hymn. In the coda the main theme of the third movement returns as the basis of a peaceful epilogue.

The full score was published by Universal Edition, Vienna in 1925. Myaskovsky revised the work in 1947. In this later version the chorus is optional.

== Recordings ==
There have been several recordings of this symphony, conducted by, among others, Kirill Kondrashin (twice), Yevgeny Svetlanov, Dmitry Liss, Neeme Järvi, Veronika Dudarova and Robert Stankovsky. Only Svetlanov – thus far the only conductor who recorded all 27 Myaskovsky symphonies – omitted the chorus in the finale.
