= Symphony No. 10 (Myaskovsky) =

The Symphony No. 10 in F minor, Op. 30 by Nikolai Myaskovsky is among the more remarkable of the Russian composer's large output of 27 symphonies.

Composed in Moscow in 1926–27, it was inspired by Alexander Pushkin's 1833 poem The Bronze Horseman, which tells of a young man whose fiancée is drowned by the disastrous flooding of Saint Petersburg by the River Neva in 1824 and who curses the prominent equestrian statue of Peter the Great, only to be pursued through the city by the statue until he too is drowned.

The basic events of the poem may be discerned in Myaskovsky’s music, notably the flood in the opening passage (marked Tumultuoso), plus themes for the principal characters (the sole lyrical element, played Patetico on solo woodwind or violin, symbolizes the drowned fiancée) and the pursuit by the statue, a Presto Tempestoso fugue on a subject using ten of the twelve pitches of the chromatic scale. In fact Myaskovsky was not so much inspired by the poem as by Alexander Benois's illustrations to it.

In its form Myaskovsky's Tenth Symphony "collapses the elements of a four-movement symphony into a densely argued single-movement form lasting little more than quarter of an hour".

It requires a large orchestra, rich in brass instruments. Myaskovsky commented that the symphony was "filled with the deafening racket of four trumpets, eight horns and so on" and described it to Sergei Prokofiev as being "as massive as if it were made of iron".

The premiere was given in Moscow on 2 April 1928 by the conductorless orchestra Persimfans, but the complexity of the music defeated them. In 1930 Prokofiev managed to persuade Leopold Stokowski to give a well-received U.S. premiere in Philadelphia.
