= Conductorless orchestra =

Instrumental ensemble not led by a conductor

The conductorless orchestra, sometimes referred to as a self-conducted orchestra or unconducted orchestra, is an instrumental ensemble that functions as an orchestra but is not led or directed by a conductor. Most conductorless orchestras are smaller in size, and generally perform chamber orchestra repertoire. Several conductorless orchestras are made up of only strings and focus primarily on string orchestra repertoire. Conductorless orchestras generally come from the classical music tradition and perform standard repertoire, but many conductorless orchestras promote or specialise in contemporary classical music repertoire. Many contemporary classical music ensembles also regularly perform without conductors.

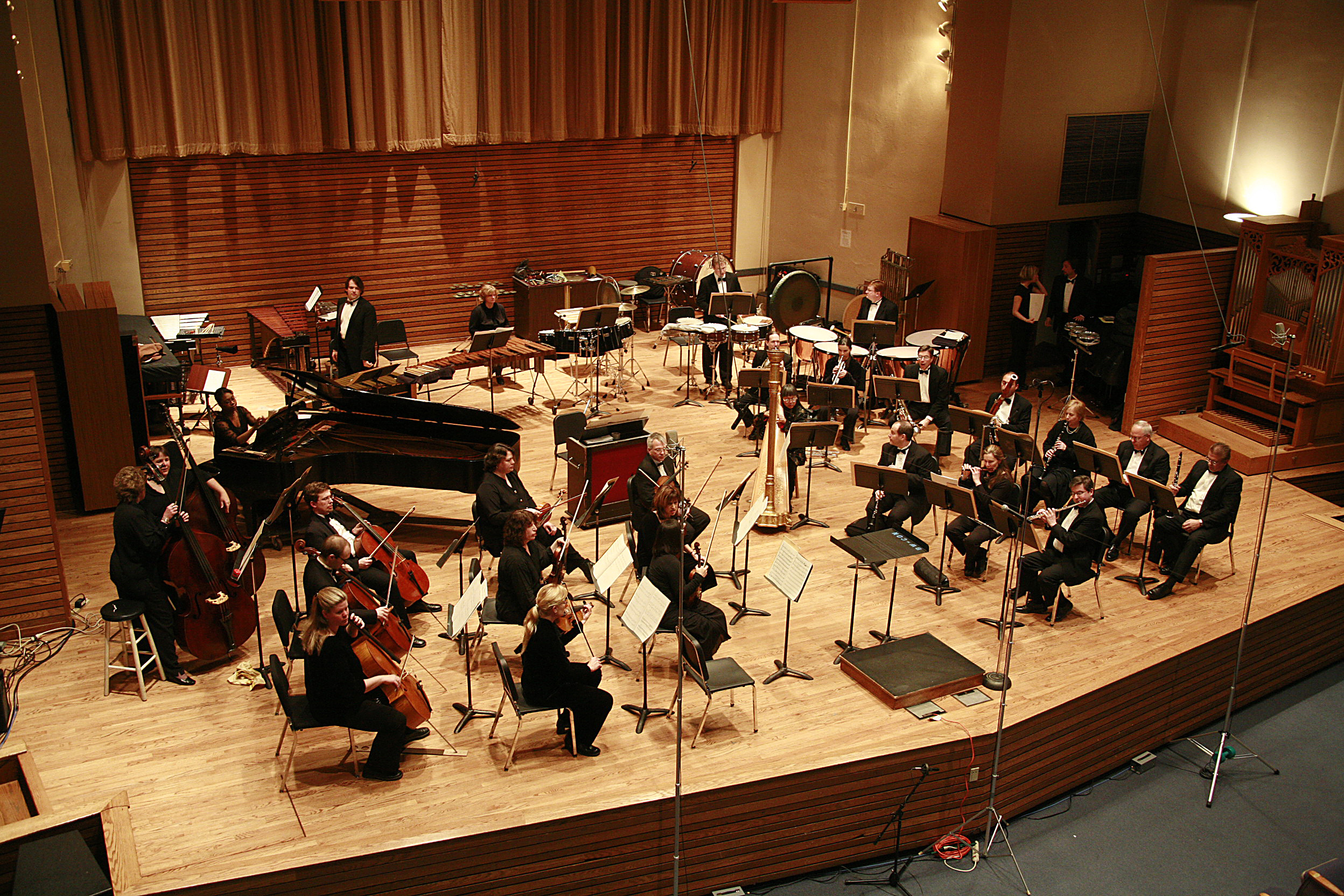
Cleveland Chamber Symphony 9 April 2006

== History ==
Early orchestras did not utilize a conductor, but instead the concertmaster or the continuo player, generally the harpsichordist, led the orchestra. As the orchestra grew in size throughout the latter half of the 18th century, composers generally conducted their music to facilitate more expedient and efficient rehearsal and performance preparation. By the 19th century, conductors were considered an integral part of the orchestra and a distinct role separate from the composer. Most, if not all, performances throughout the 19th century and into the early 20th century were led by conductors.

=== 1920s ===
After the Russian Revolution in the early twentieth century, the Pervïy Simfonicheskiy Ansambl′ bez Dirizhyora (Russian for "First Conductorless Symphony Ensemble"), or Persimfans formed in the Soviet Union. The purpose of the conductorless state of this orchestra did not stem from musical ideals alone but encapsulated the political and philosophical ideas of the time. Persimfans built itself upon egalitarian concepts and functioned by committee. They sat in a large circle while they performed and took cues across the circle. Persimfans formed in 1922 and lasted ten years until it disbanded for political reasons.

=== 1950s ===
Founded in 1951, the Prague Chamber Orchestra (PKO) is perhaps one of the longest-running conductorless orchestras. The orchestra started when members of the Czechoslovak Radio Symphony Orchestra formed an ensemble more suited for non-standard programming. The orchestra's first album contained Bohemian music, recorded in 1951, though their repertoire now spans works from the Baroque era to contemporary music. As the demands of the orchestra increased, the Prague Chamber Orchestra became independent of the Czechoslovak Radio Symphony Orchestra in 1965. The Prague Chamber Orchestra collaborates with conductors for special recording projects, though the standard model and philosophy of performance for the ensemble are conductorless. After the fall of communism, the musicians formed their own company, PKO Agency Ltd., and managed all critical operations of the ensemble.

Founded in 1953, as an ensemble of Radio Zagreb, under the artistic leadership of the renowned cellist and conductor Antonio Janigro – Zagreb Soloists have gained recognition as one of the world’s most prominent chamber orchestras.

=== 1970s ===
The Orpheus Chamber Orchestra was founded in 1972 by cellist Julian Fifer and a group of fellow musicians who sought to incorporate chamber music techniques into orchestral playing. The orchestra has been conductorless since its inception and all members rotate leadership roles depending on the demands of the piece performed.

In 1975, cellist John Painter founded the Australian Chamber Orchestra (ACO). The ACO is a conductorless chamber orchestra led by concertmaster Richard Tognetti, appointed artistic director and lead violin in 1990. The ACO functions as an ensemble of soloists and gravitates toward cross-genre programming. They perform on both modern and period instruments, in smaller chamber groups, as a chamber orchestra, and as an electro-acoustic collective. Referencing traditions, all musicians except cellists stand while performing.

=== 1980s ===
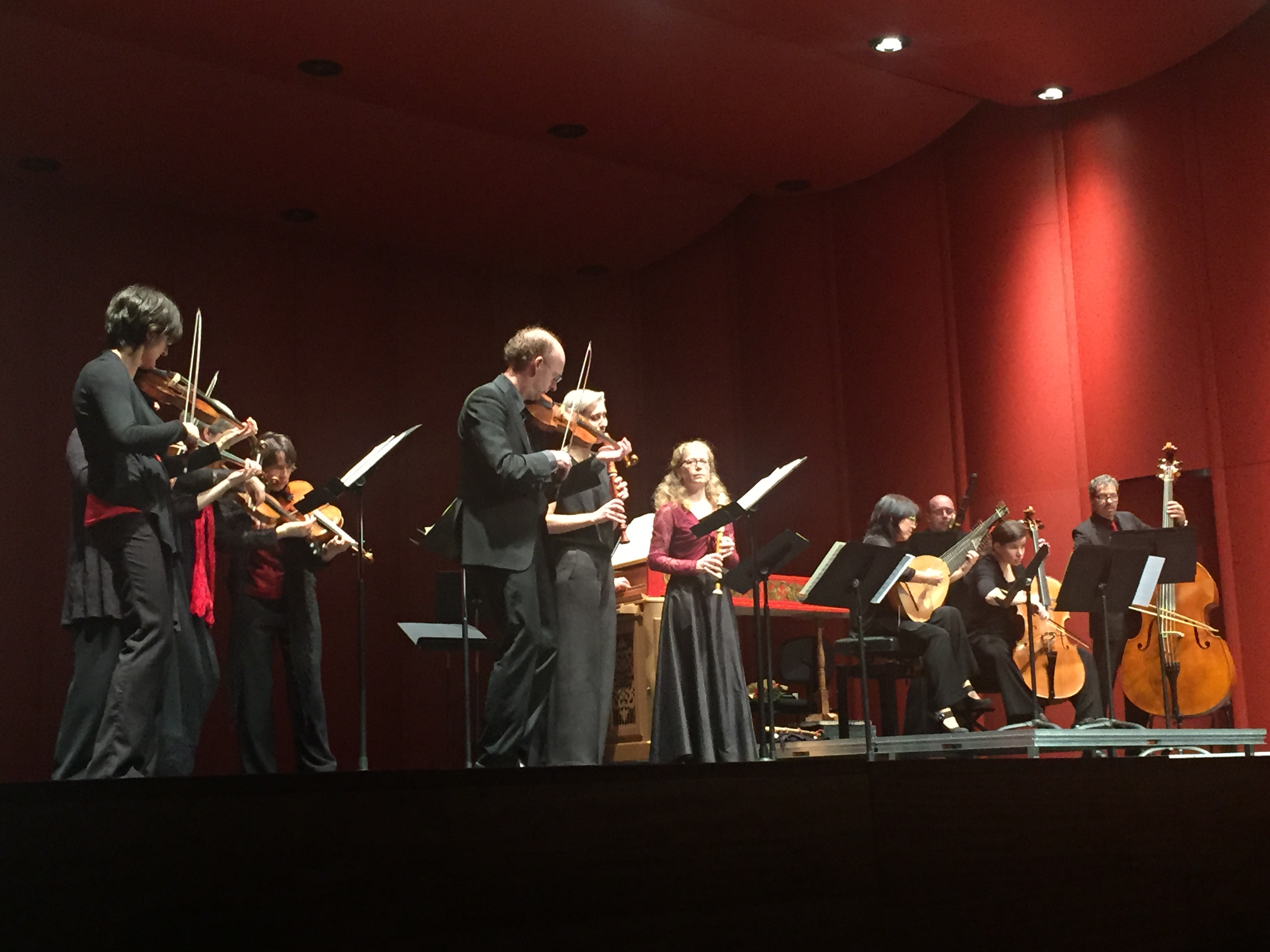
Akademie für Alte Musik Berlin 3608

The Amsterdam Sinfonietta was founded in 1988.

=== 1990s ===
The New Century Chamber Orchestra is based in the San Francisco Bay Area. Founded in 1992, the first music director and concertmaster was Stuart Canin. The orchestra has also been directed and led by concertmaster Krista Bennion Feeney. The current music director and concertmaster is Nadja Salerno-Sonnenberg. The New Century Chamber Orchestra's repertoire spans both traditional and contemporary repertoire. The ensemble regularly commissions new works and features cross-genre programs transcending jazz, rock, and classical styles. The New Century Chamber Orchestra is a string orchestra of 20 members (10 violins, 5 violas, 4 celli, 1 bass).

Sometimes an orchestra that normally performs with a conductor will perform without one. The New York Philharmonic traditionally performs the overture to Candide without a conductor since the death of their Laureate Conductor, Leonard Bernstein, in 1990.

=== Early 21st century ===
The early 21st century saw a rise in the formation of conductorless chamber orchestras and chamber music collaboratives.

The East Coast Chamber Orchestra (ECCO) was envisioned in 2001 when a group of young string players sought to form a conductorless chamber orchestra, based upon democratic principles. The members are soloists, orchestral musicians, and chamber musicians all mainly trained at Marlboro Music School and Festival. ECCO is a string orchestra made up of 17 instrumentalists.

The Advent Chamber Orchestra started in 2003 when Roxana Pavel and Elias Goldstein worked together in chamber music ensembles. The ensemble functioned primarily as a chamber music collaborative until 2005 performed their first concert as the Advent Chamber Orchestra. The ensemble is generally led by concertmaster and music director Roxana Pavel, but artistic decisions are achieved democratically.

A Far Cry, formed in early 2007, is a Boston-based chamber orchestra made up of 18 string players. A Far Cry describes itself as self-conducted and operates with rotating leadership and no conductor. All artistic decisions are made by vote, and the orchestra members handle all the artistic management and promotion of the ensemble. A Far Cry has close ties to the New England Conservatory (NEC) as well as the Isabella Stewart Gardner Museum, where it is ensemble-in-residence.

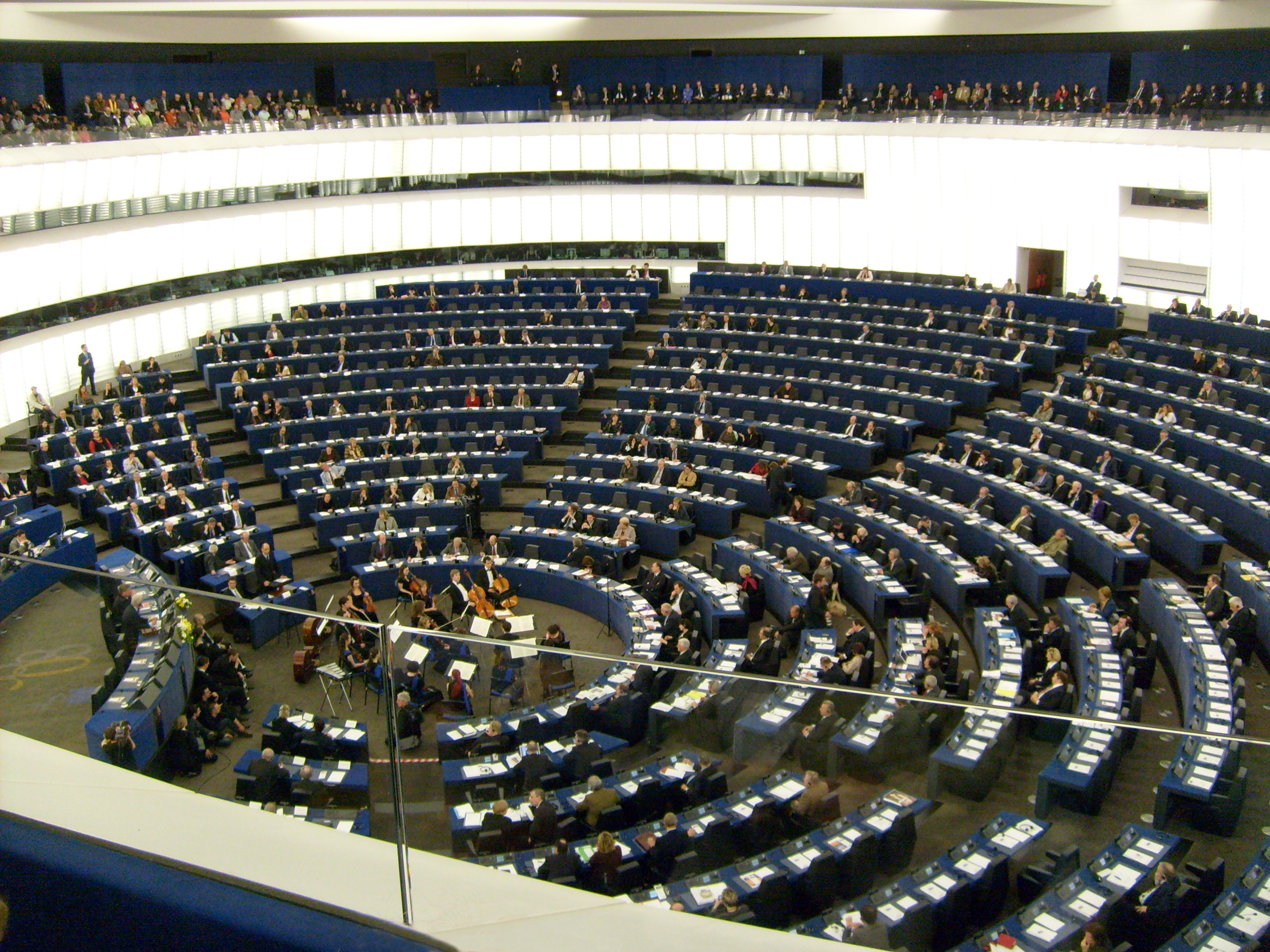
European Parliament, Strasbourg, with chamber orchestra performing

The orchestra Spira Mirabilis, formed in 2007, is a European classical orchestra functioning without a conductor.

The Lyra Vivace Chamber Orchestra], founded in 2010, is a musician-run collective based in Augusta, Georgia, and the South-Eastern United States. Lyra Vivace is an ensemble of InPraiseofMusic.org, a resource of and for professional musicians.

Arizona Chamber Orchestra is a conductorless ensemble. Based in Phoenix, the Arizona Chamber Orchestra presents its inaugural season in 2011 with a nucleus of 15 string players, performing throughout Arizona.

Polish symphonic orchestra Sinfonia Varsovia hasn't had a permanent conductor since Krzysztof Penderecki and Marc Minkowski (since 2012). Similarly, Polish Chamber Orchestra hasn't had its permanent conductor since Nigel Kennedy (since 2008). Both perform regularly without a conductor.

Kaleidoscope Chamber Orchestra was formed in 2014 in Los Angeles by Benjamin Mitchell. They are currently known primarily for their call for scores, a program that draws globally from the finest upcoming composers, creating a diverse season of new works.

North Corner Chamber Orchestra (NOCCO)] formed in 2014 in Seattle. This group, averaging 35 musicians, performs a diverse range of music spanning 400 years, including newly commissioned works each season, works by composers from historically-neglected populations, and a concerto competition. They perform in non-traditional venues, including community centers, distilleries, and The Royal Room.

Prometheus Chamber Orchestra, a Philadelphia based ensemble, is the resident ensemble of the Church of the Advocate. An entire volunteer orchestra, their concerts are free and open to the public, targeting underserved populations by performing in low-income neighborhoods.

Ars Nova Chamber Orchestra, formed in late 2010, is a Washington, D.C.-based chamber orchestra made up of 29 musicians. It is self-conducted and operates with rotating leadership in all sections. Ars Nova's artistic decisions are guided by the musicians, and they all participate in marketing and administering the ensemble. The ensemble's members include D.C.-based musicians and musicians based in other parts of the United States.

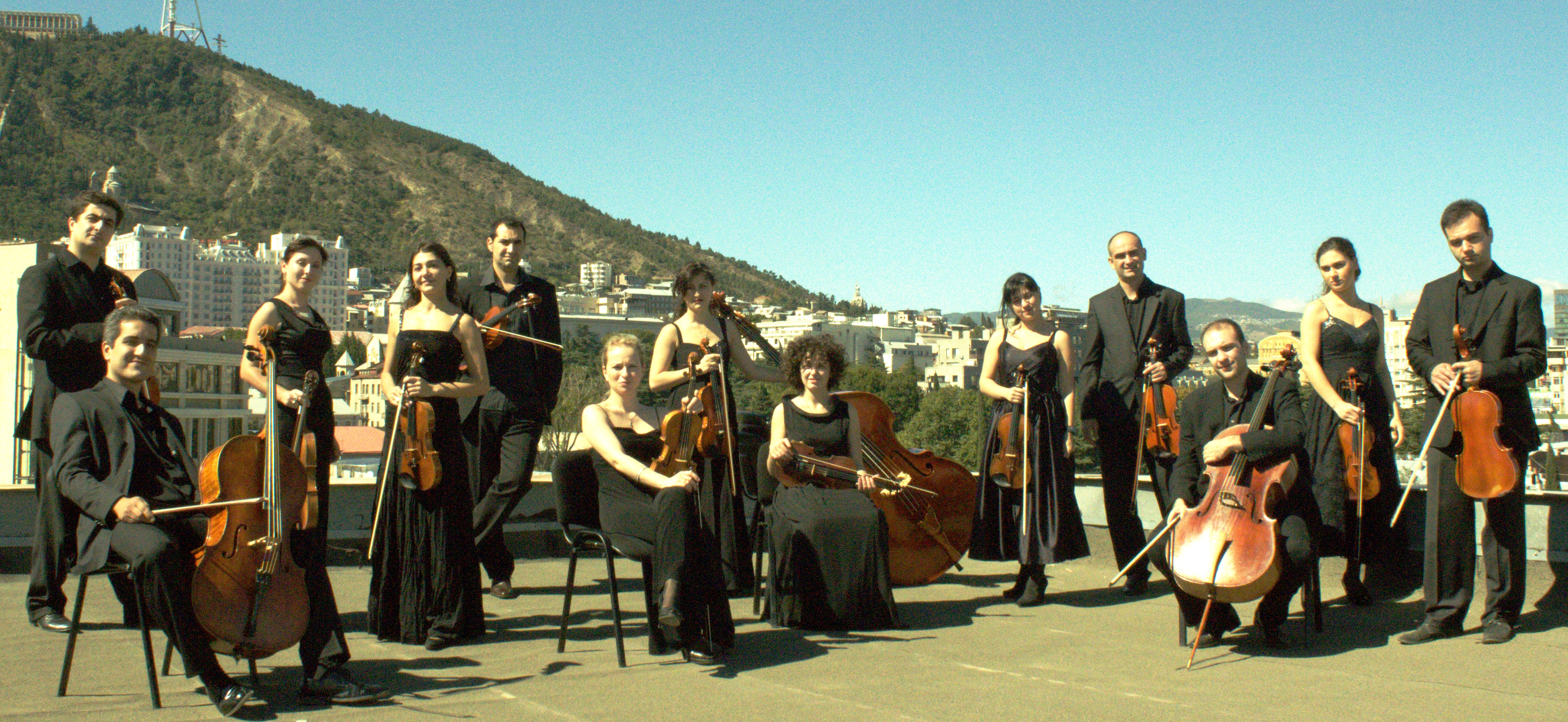
Georgian Sinfonietta

== Leadership and management ==
One aspect of conductorless chamber orchestras that sets them apart from other instrumental ensembles is the democratic leadership model. A conductor generally makes the artistic decisions for an ensemble, and in the absence of a conductor, artistic direction and leadership must be delegated elsewhere. Many currently operating ensembles, such as A Far Cry, East Coast Chamber Orchestra, Ars Nova Chamber Orchestra, and Orpheus, incorporate the democratic model into their mission statement and build their organizational structure and rehearsal techniques on this model. Orpheus is the subject of a book on democratic leadership in the workplace by Harvey Seifter and Peter Economy entitled Leadership Ensemble: Lessons in Collaborative Management from the World-Famous Conductorless Orchestra.

Another leadership model that several conductorless groups utilize is that of a dual artistic director/concertmaster role. The Australian Chamber Orchestra and New Century Chamber Orchestra embrace this model and the artistic direction and leadership are generally organized by the lead violin.

Note that some orchestras, such as Pro Arte Chamber Orchestra of Boston and the London Philharmonic Orchestra, have conductors but are cooperatively run by the musicians.

== Notes and references ==
=== Sources ===
- Eckhard, John, "Orchester ohne Dirigent", Neue Zeitschrift für Musik 158, no. 2 (1997): 40–43.
- Sabaneev, Leonid and Pring, S. W., "A Conductorless Orchestra", The Musical Times 69, no. 1022 (1928): 307–309.
