= Symphony No. 3 (Myaskovsky) =

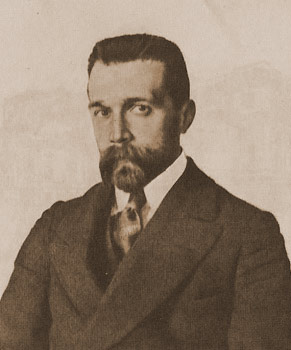
Nikolai Myaskovsky in 1912

Nikolai Myaskovsky wrote his Symphony No. 3 in A minor, Op. 15 in 1914. The third symphony was the last that Myaskovsky wrote before the outbreak of the First World War. The past works of the composer that had been taken up by performers at this time, particularly the Cello Sonata in D major, Op. 12 were already well-liked. Work on the symphony was terminated in April 1914.

It is dedicated to Boris Asafyev.

== Analysis ==
It is in two movements:

1. Non troppo vivo, vigoroso
2. Deciso e sdegnoso

Myaskovsky's internal disruption, which was already to be recognized in other early works, shows up most impressively in the third symphony. As example only the contrast between the first two subjects of the first movement or between the end of the first movement and the introduction of the second movement might be mentioned. Myaskovsky obviously still was in this early phase of his work, in the search for his own style, in which search the symphony represents a compromise between the music of the Russian Romantics and the traumatic processing of the experiences of the time.

=== I. Non troppo vivo, vigoroso ===
The first movement in A minor begins with an introduction in E♭ major, in which most of the motivic material of the whole piece is introduced. First, on dark grumbles in the basses, a fanfare appears which emerges again and again during the piece. Afterwards a second, majestic and threatening theme appears. The following three-part sonata form begins with a tough, convulsive/desperate theme. The very chromatic and nearly already atonal transition leads to a loud and tutti (whole-orchestra) variant of the second theme of the introduction. After a calming of the music the second, songful theme begins, which is based the introduction fanfare. The third theme begins in D♭ major, development and Reprise are structurally conventional, though the last minutes are in A major and clearly calmer and more peaceful.

=== II. Deciso e sdegnoso ===
The second movement begins with resounding, fanfare-like chords, which lead by a fast development to the main theme of the Rondo. The second, dancing theme in E minor and a variant of the main subject of the first movement follows, whereby this variant is so strongly amended that one could call it also an independent theme. After a slowing down of the music appears the central part of the movement, which exhibits again a threatening tendency. The part ends with a theme in unison, follows a repetition of the introduction and the two themes of the Rondo.

A further variant of the theme of the first movement, this time so alienated, leads up to the last, surprising section of the symphony: a mourning march in the form A–B–A. It begins with a quiet theme in the string section, which falls back also onto the second theme of the Rondo. The second part consists of a long, large crescendo. This leads to the first theme of the movement, which is intoned, this time strongly, by the whole orchestra. The Coda of the march, which is simultaneously the Coda of the movement, is again calm and quiet, appears a kind of cello cadence with several A minor added sixth chords, which are underlaid with the clay/tone sequence E F♯ G♯ A in the basses. In the end the chord and the basses sound play a final A.

This unusual conclusion show clearly the mind condition at that time of Myaskovsky: The mourning march symbolizes the fright and the hopelessness of the political and social situation in the Russia of 1914.

== Reception and criticism ==
After the conclusion of the third symphony, Myaskovsky began to be in a way dissatisfied with himself, and he considered giving up composing perhaps completely at least from the front. While Myaskovsky fought at the front during World War I, the message reached him that the conductors Aslanov (who had already premiered the first symphony) and Alexander Siloti were interested in the score of the third symphony. With this symphony, Myaskovsky's nationalistic attitude was made clear.
