= Yevgeny Svetlanov =

Soviet and Russian conductor (1928–2002)

- Евгений Светланов
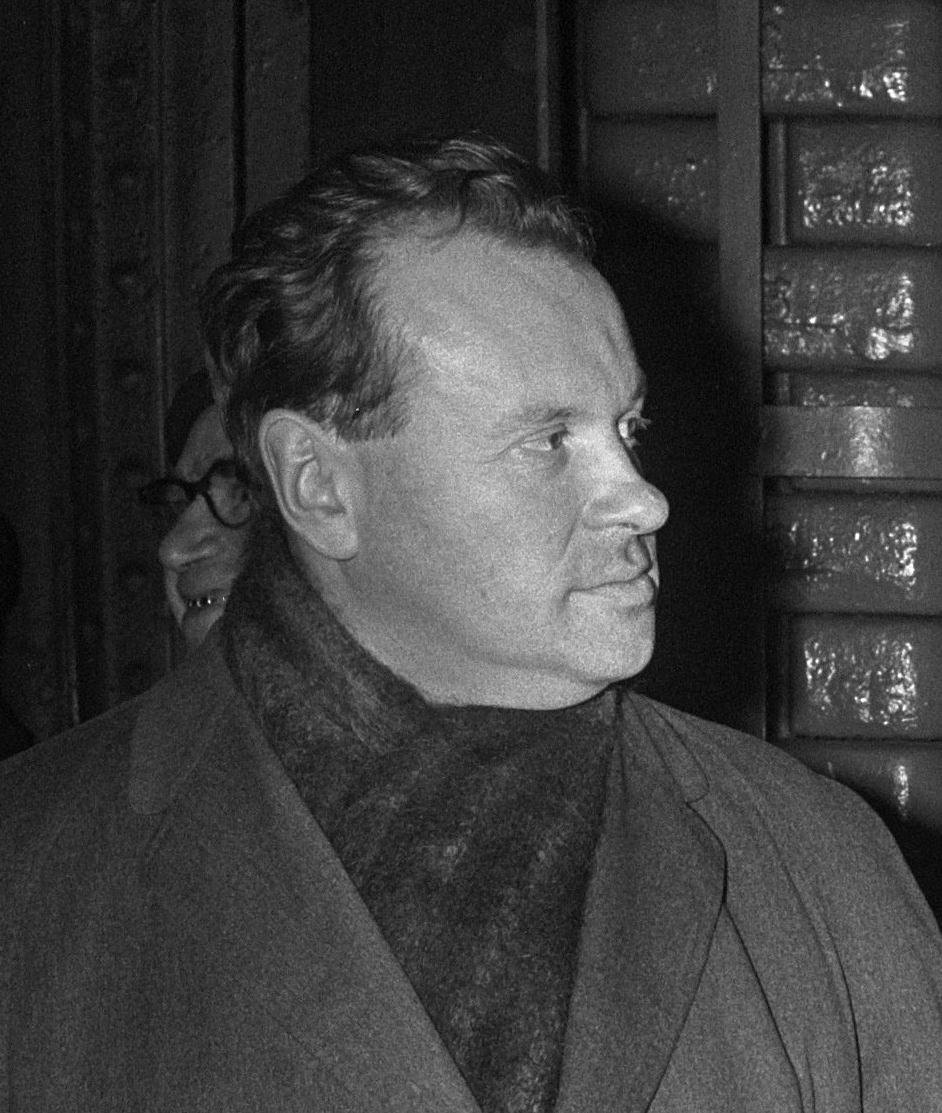
- Svetlanov in 1967
- Born: 6 September 1928; Moscow, Soviet Union
- Died: 3 May 2002 (aged 73); Moscow, Russia
- Burial place: Vagankovo Cemetery
- Education: Moscow Conservatory
- Occupations: Conductor; composer; pianist

Yevgeny Fyodorovich Svetlanov (Russian: Евгений Фёдорович Светланов; 6 September 1928 – 3 May 2002) was a Soviet and Russian conductor, composer, and pianist.

== Life and work ==
Svetlanov was born in Moscow and studied conducting with Alexander Gauk at the Moscow Conservatory. From 1955 he conducted at the Bolshoi Theatre, being appointed principal conductor there in 1962. From 1965 he was principal conductor of the USSR State Symphony Orchestra (now the Russian State Symphony Orchestra). In 1979 he was appointed principal guest conductor of the London Symphony Orchestra. Svetlanov was also music director of the Residentie Orchestra (The Hague) from 1992 to 2000 and the Swedish Radio Symphony Orchestra from 1997 to 1999.

In 2000 Svetlanov was fired from his post with the Russian State Symphony Orchestra by the minister of culture of Russia, Mikhail Shvydkoy. The reason given was that Svetlanov was spending too much time conducting abroad and not enough time in Moscow.

Svetlanov was particularly noted for his interpretations of Russian works – he covered the whole range of Russian music, from Mikhail Glinka to the present day. He was also one of the few Russian conductors to conduct the entire symphonic output of Gustav Mahler.

His own compositions included a String Quartet (1948), Daugava, Symphonic Poem (1952), Siberian Fantasy for Orchestra, Op. 9 (1953), Images d'Espagne, Rhapsody for orchestra (1954), Symphony (1956), Festive Poem (1966), Russian Variations for harp and orchestra (1975), Piano Concerto in c minor (1976) and Poem for Violin and Orchestra "To the Memory of David Oistrakh" (1975). He composed Siberian Fantasy in 1953/54, in collaboration with Igor Yakushenko [1932-1999].

Svetlanov was also an extremely competent pianist, three notable recordings being Sergei Rachmaninoff's Piano Trio No. 2 in D minor and Cello Sonata op. 19, and a disc of Nikolai Medtner's piano music.

Warner Music France has issued an "Édition officielle Yevgeny Svetlanov" featuring Svetlanov's legacy of recordings as conductor and pianist, which by July 2008 had run to 35 volumes of CDs, often multiple-CD boxed sets. The biggest of these is the 16-CD box of the complete symphonies of Nikolai Myaskovsky, to whose music Svetlanov was devoted.

== Legacy ==
The first Airbus A330 for Aeroflot and the asteroid 4135 Svetlanov were named after him. The State Academic Symphony Orchestra of the Russian Federation and an international conducting competition also carry his name.

Cultural offices
Preceded by Alexander Melik-Pashayev	Music Director, Bolshoi Theatre, Moscow; 1963-1965	Succeeded by Gennady Rozhdestvensky
Preceded by Konstantin Ivanov	Music Director, State Academic Symphony Orchestra of the Russian Federation; 1965-2000	Succeeded by Vassily Sinaisky
Preceded by Hans Vonk	Chief Conductor, Het Residentie Orkest; 1992-2000	Succeeded by Jaap van Zweden
Preceded by Esa-Pekka Salonen	Principal Conductor, Swedish Radio Symphony Orchestra; 1997-1999	Succeeded by Manfred Honeck
