= Ivan Pochekin =

Russian violinist (born 1987)

- Иван Почекин
- Portrait of Ivan Pochekin
- Born: 1987 (age 38–39); Moscow
- Occupation: Violinist
- Father: Yury Pochekin

Ivan Pochekin (born 1987 in Moscow) is a Russian violinist, who won first prize in the 2005 Third Paganini Moscow International Violin Competition. He won second place in the 8th International Vaclav Huml Violin Competition.

== Biography ==
His father is the violin master Yuri Pochekin.

== Career ==
In 2002 he made his debut in the Great Hall of the Moscow Conservatory. Performed Sergei Prokofiev's Second Violin Concerto.

Among the conductors with whom he performed: Valery Gergiev, Mikhail Pletnev, Vladimir Spivakov, Alexander Sladkovsky, Fabio Mastrangelo, Vladimir Fedoseyev, Friedrich Haider and others.

At the invitation of Denis Matsuev, he performed in the programs of the Crescendo (Kaliningrad, Pskov) and Stars on Baikal (Irkutsk) festivals.

As for 2018, he collaborated with the E.F. Svetlanov State Academic Symphony Orchestra of Russia, the Mariinsky Theater Orchestra, the Russian National Orchestra, the Tchaikovsky Symphony Orchestra and others.

== Awards ==
2005 - victory at the III International Violin Competition named after Niccolo Paganini
