= Elisey Mysin =

Russian pianist, artist

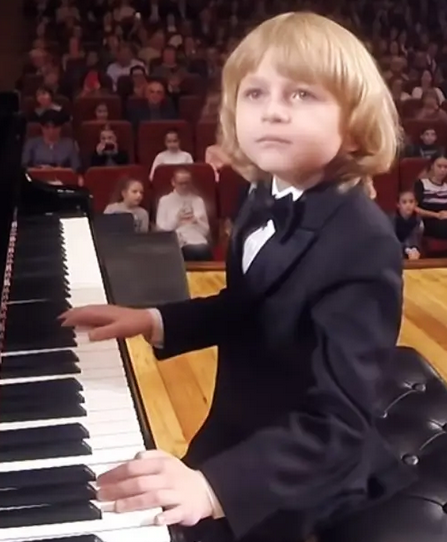
- Mysin in 2019

Background information
- Born: 25 October 2010 (age 16)
- Genre: Classical music
- Occupations: Pianist
- Instruments: Piano
- Years active: 2017–Present
- Website: https://eliseymysin.com/

Elisey Mysin (Russian: Елисей Мысин; born 25 October 2010) is a Russian pianist, composer, child prodigy and actor. Born in Stavropol, he studies at the Central Music School at the Moscow State Conservatory in the class of Professor Natalia Trull and Daniil Tsvetkov. He has performed with fellow piano virtuoso Denis Matsuev and has also played with the Russian National Orchestra and the Youth Symphony.

== Career ==
Elisey's first teacher was Lyudmila Tichomirova.

At the age of eight, without a score, he performed Mozart's Concerto No. 3 in D major in Naberezhnye Chelny, Russia, in public.

In Vienna he participated in the 2018 Classical Young Stars, an international music festival for children and adolescents under the presidency of Denis Matsuev.

Later that year, at the age of 12, Mysin served as a Junior Judge on the adjudication jury for the Nashville International Piano Competition, having previously won 1st prize in the competition's Artiste division for pianists aged 16–22.

== Acting ==
Elisey Mysin made his acting debut playing Minka in the 2020 film All about Lyolya and Minka (Про Лёлю и Миньку).

== Awards and prizes ==
- 2016: Finalist on the "Blue Bird" Russian TV competition
- 2017: 1st prize in the 5th International Youth Competition "Where Art is Born"
- 2017: Laureate of the "Astana Piano Passion" International Piano Youth Competition in Kazakhstan
- 2019: Soloist in the A.B. Michelangeli International Festival in Trento, Italy
- 2020 and 2021: 1st prize at the Vladimir Krainev International Piano Competition in Moscow
- 2022: 1st prize at the 4th Zhuhai International Mozart Competition for Young Musicians in China
- 2022: Grand Prize Golden Parnassus at the XVIII International Piano Forum "Bieszczady bez granic" in Sanok, Poland
- 2023: 1st prize at the Düsseldorf International Robert Schumann Competition for Young Pianists
- 2023: 1st prize at the Cleveland International Piano Competition for Young Artists (Junior category ages 11–14)
- 2023: 1st prize at the Nashville International Chopin Piano Competition in Nashville, Tennessee (Artiste division, ages 16–22)

== Selected performances ==
- 2018: Opening of the Russian Seasons International Festival in Italy
- 2018: Amadeus Weekend Music Festival in Austria
- 2018: Classical Young Stars Vienna Music Festival in Austria
- 2021: InClassica International Music Festival in Dubai
- 2025: XX International Music Festival "Stars on Baikal" in Irkutsk, Russia
- 2025: Great Hall of the Moscow Conservatory in Moscow

== Scholarships ==
- "New Names" International Charitable Foundation Scholarship
- Yamaha Scholarship
