= Russian National Youth Symphony Orchestra =

National youth orchestra of Russia

- Youth orchestra
- Native name: Российский национальный молодёжный симфонический оркестр
- Short name: PHMCO / RNYSO
- Founded: 2018
- Location: Moscow, Russia
- Website: www.mariinsky.ru/en/company/guestgroup/russian_nat_youth_symph_orch/

The Russian National Youth Symphony Orchestra (RNYSO) (Russian: Российский национальный молодёжный симфонический оркестр, PHMCO) is the national youth orchestra of Russia, based in Moscow. It was established in 2018 with the support of the Foundation of Presidential Grants and the Ministry of Culture and consists of 108 instrumentalists from throughout Russia.

The orchestra has been conducted by Valery Gergiev, Vladimir Fedoseyev, Michail Jurowski, Alexander Lazarev, Alexander Sladkovsky, Jean-Christophe Spinosi, Yuri Simonov, Antonello Manacorda, Alexander Anisimov, Nayden Todorov and Maxim Emelyanychev. Soloists that have appeared with the ensemble include Denis Matsuev, Julian Rachlin, Pavel Milyukov, Dmitry Masleev, Sergei Dogadin, Anastasia Kobekina, Alexandre Kantorow, Konstantin Emelyanov, Mao Fujita, Kenneth Broberg, Boris Berezovsky, Barry Douglas, Nikolai Lugansky, Lars Vogt, Sergej Krylov, Alina Ibragimova, Maxim Rysanov and Julia Lezhneva.
