= Ramzi Yassa =

Egyptian pianist

Ramzi Yassa (Arabic: رمزى يسى; born 1948) is an Egyptian pianist. Born in Cairo, Yassa is an outstanding member of the first batch of musicians trained at the Cairo Conservatory. Yassa then joined the Tchaikovsky Conservatory in Moscow in the class of Sergei Dorensky, where he earned an Honorary certificate after taking part in the 1974 Tchaikovsky competition. He then launched a concert career, settling in Paris. In 1977, he was the first Egyptian pianist to win a major piano competition—the 'Paloma O'Shea' Santander International Piano Competition.

The first Arab pianist to record Beethoven's piano concertos (Cairo Symphony Orchestra, Ahmed El Saedi), Ramzi Yassa has performed in halls as renowned as the Vienna's Musikverein, the Berliner Philharmonie, the John F. Kennedy Center for the Performing Arts, the Barbican Centre, the Royal Albert Hall or the Théâtre des Champs-Élysées, the Forbidden City Concert Hall, the Biblioteca Alexandrina, and in Egypt’s New Capital Opera in 2021, collaborating with conductors such as Vladimir Ashkenazy, Charles Groves, Yehudi Menuhin, Zubin Mehta, Leonard Slatkin, Alexander Sladkovsky, as well as other major Egyptian conductors.

His recordings include works by Tchaikovsky, Prokofiev, Chopin, and the Beethoven piano concertos, among others.

Ramzi Yassa has been in the Panel of Judges in numerous international competitions in the United States, the United Kingdom, South Africa and Europe. He represented France in the Horowitz Competition, the Rubinstein Competition as well as the Santander Competition.

As Artistic Director of the International Music Center - Manasterly Palace in Egypt, he invited exclusive international artists in a series that lasted for more than a decade. He is the Artistic Advisor of the Manial Palace Festival.

Ramzi Yassa has given many charity concerts and is involved with the organization "Copts in Need". He also performed a series of concerts with "The Peace Orchestra" conducted by Nader Abbassi, in particular at the City Hall in Paris. Ramzi Yassa is a founder member of the ADAP, Association of Artists for Peace, and has given concerts in France, Belgium, Luxembourg, Greece and Turkey.

Yassa teaches at the École Normale de Musique "Alfred Cortot" in Paris, where he currently resides. He is a recipient of the Liszt Centennial Commemorative Medal as well as the 2007 Egyptian Merit State Prize for Music, for the first time awarded to a performing musician.

== See also ==
- List of Copts
- Lists of Egyptians
