= Alexis Soriano =

Spanish conductor and composer

Alexis Soriano (Chicago, 1964) is a Spanish conductor and composer of Spanish–Lithuanian descent. He studied piano and conducting in Spain, the United Kingdom, the United States and Russia, and was a pupil of Ilya Musin. Soriano has conducted major orchestras and opera houses in Europe, the Americas and Asia, and since 2020 he has served as the founder and artistic director of the International Alborada Clásica Festival in Spain. His career combines symphonic and operatic conducting with original compositions, including several chamber operas.

== Early life and education ==
Soriano studied piano at the Madrid Royal Conservatory before continuing his training at the Royal Northern College of Music in Manchester. He later studied conducting at the Cleveland Institute of Music and at the Rimsky-Korsakov Conservatory in Saint Petersburg under Ilya Musin.

== Career ==
Soriano made his professional debut in 1987 with the Valencia Symphony Orchestra. From 1998 to 2008 he was Principal Associate Conductor of the Hermitage Orchestra of Saint Petersburg. Between 2010 and 2012 he served as Principal Conductor of the INSO-Lviv Symphony Orchestra (Ukraine), and since 2012 he has been Artistic Director of the New York Opera Society.

He has conducted numerous orchestras across Europe, the Americas and Asia, including the Mariinsky Orchestra, Prague Symphony, Slovak Philharmonic, Lithuanian National Symphony Orchestra, Lithuanian Chamber Orchestra, Buenos Aires Philharmonic, Tapiola Sinfonietta, Oulu Symphony Orchestra, English Chamber Orchestra, Moscow Virtuosi, Russian National Youth Symphony Orchestra, as well as major Spanish orchestras.

In 2007, at Valery Gergiev’s invitation, he participated in the BBC film The Master and His Pupil and made his conducting debut at the Mariinsky Theatre with Mozart’s The Marriage of Figaro.

== Operatic and symphonic work ==
Soriano has conducted at venues such as Teatro Real, Teatro Colón, Auditorio de Tenerife, Lithuanian National Opera and Ballet Theatre, Hermitage Theatre, and the Leopolis Opera Festival (Ukraine). His staged repertoire includes Rigoletto, Faust, Boris Godunov, The Marriage of Figaro, The Barber of Seville, La scala di seta, Così fan tutte, Madama Butterfly, Falstaff and Eugene Onegin.

A champion of new operas, in 2009 at Passau Festival he premièred Antonio Castilla-Ávila’s "La Dulcinea de Don Quijote", in 2017 he premièred "Three Top Hats" by Ricardo Llorca in São Paulo, and in 2019 the world première of "Lilith, luna negra" by David del Puerto at the Úbeda Festival in Spain. He also conducted the new production of Ricardo Llorca's "The Empty Hours" at the Teatro Real in 2021, which received wide acclaim from audiences and critics alike.

In February 2025, Soriano premiered his own opera, "Malcolm X, A Portrait", during the International Alborada Clásica Festival in Motril, Spain.

=== Selected repertoire ===
- G. Verdi: Rigoletto, Falstaff
- C. Gounod: Faust
- M. Mussorgsky: Boris Godunov
- W. A. Mozart: Le nozze di Figaro, Così fan tutte
- G. Rossini: Il barbiere di Siviglia (The Barber of Seville), La scala di seta
- G. Puccini: Madama Butterfly
- P. I. Tchaikovsky: Eugene Onegin

== Awards and recognition ==
In 2013 Soriano was selected among the “100 Spaniards” recognized for their international achievements, an initiative supported by Spain's Marca España program. In the same year he received the Čiurlionis Foundation Prize in Lithuania for his musical achievements.

== Compositions ==
Soriano has written orchestral, chamber and vocal music, including chamber operas. His operatic works include:

- Frida and Diego, based on the lives of Frida Kahlo and Diego Rivera.
- Sonata for a Queen, inspired by Queen Bárbara de Braganza and King Ferdinand VI of Spain.
- Malcolm X, A Portrait, premiered in February 2025 within the International Alborada Clásica Festival in Motril, Spain.
- El rayo que no cesa, vocal cycle for mezzo-soprano, baritone and piano, based on poems by Miguel Hernández.

His string quartet Of Souls and Prayers premiered in May 2024 in Klaipėda, Lithuania.

== Festival direction and teaching ==
Since 2020 Soriano has been the founder and artistic director of the International Alborada Clásica Festival held in Motril and Salobreña, Spain. The festival has featured ensembles such as the Chamber Orchestra of Klaipėda, alongside internationally renowned soloists.

Since 2025, Soriano has served as Professor of Orchestral Conducting at the International Music School of Madrid. He has also collaborated with the Polytechnic University of Madrid in scenographic and operatic projects as a guest professor, contributing to interdisciplinary programs combining music, stage design and performing arts.

He has also taught conducting masterclasses in Japan (University of Tokyo), Brazil, and Spain, and has served as a jury member in international music competitions.

== Career timeline ==
Year	Event	Location
1987	Debut with Valencia Symphony Orchestra	Valencia, Spain
1998–2008	Principal Associate Conductor, Hermitage Orchestra	Saint Petersburg, Russia
2007	Debut at Mariinsky Theatre with The Marriage of Figaro	Saint Petersburg, Russia
2010–2012	Principal Conductor, INSO-Lviv Symphony Orchestra	Lviv, Ukraine
2012–present	Artistic Director, New York Opera Society	New York, USA
2013	Selected among “100 Spaniards” by Marca España	Spain
2013	Awarded Čiurlionis Prize	Lithuania
2020	Founded International Alborada Clásica Festival	Motril & Salobreña, Spain
2024	Premiere of string quartet Of Souls and Prayers	Klaipėda, Lithuania
2025	Premiere of opera Malcolm X, A Portrait	Motril, Spain
2025	Fragments of Frida and Diego opera presentation	Tokyo, Japan
