= George Harliono =

English-Indonesian classical pianist

George Harliono (born 16 January 2001) is an English-Indonesian classical pianist. He was a recipient of the Silver Medal at the XVII International Tchaikovsky Competition in 2023.

== Biography ==
Harliono was born in Hackney, East London. He began playing the piano at the age of six after his mother purchased an old upright piano. At around seven years old, his parents arranged piano lessons after he and his brother played on the family piano. He gave his first hour-long solo recital at the age of nine.

Harliono was home-schooled from the age of 13. He was accepted into the Royal College of Music's BMUS program at age 15 with a full scholarship, graduating in 2021. He has studied with Vanessa Latarche and currently studies with Pascal Nemirovski. He has also taken masterclasses with such musicians as Dmitri Bashkirov and Lang Lang. He has received mentorship from Vladimir Ashkenazy and his son Vovka Ashkenazy.

== Career ==
Harliono made his concerto debut at the age of 12. In 2016, his performance of Tchaikovsky Piano Concerto No.1 at the Great Hall of the Moscow Conservatory was broadcast live on Russian national television and streamed on Medici TV. Harliono regularly performs with artists such as Denis Matsuev. He has collaborated with conductors such as Valery Gergiev, Alexander Sladkovsky, and Sebastian Weigle.

== Awards and recognition ==
Harliono has received prizes in numerous international competitions, including the Grand Piano Competition in Moscow, the Sendai International Music Competition, the Royal Overseas League Music Competition in London, the Gina Bachauer Piano Competition in Utah, the Concours International de Lagny-sur-Marne in Paris, and the Dinu Lipatti Piano Competition in Bucharest. Earlier awards include the Emanuel Trophy (2012), first prize at the Evangelia Tjiarri International Piano Competition in Cyprus (2013), and the Jeunesses International Music Competition in Bucharest (2013). He was also a Lang Lang Music Ambassador in 2013 and received the Joan Davies Memorial Prize (2015).

In 2018, Harliono was shortlisted for an award in the "Sound of Classical Poll" at the Classic BRIT Awards. In 2022, he was awarded the "Best Guest Artist" prize at the "440 Hz" awards for his performance of Beethoven Piano Concerto No. 5 at Zaryadye Hall in Moscow. In 2023, he won the Silver Medal at the XVII International Tchaikovsky Competition.

== Personal views and influences ==
Harliono has stated his first piano teacher, Claire Swainsbury, was a significant early influence. He also credits Vladimir Ashkenazy and Alexander Sladkovsky as important influences. He considers Vladimir Horowitz his "all-time favourite" musician.
