= Masuko Ushioda =

Japanese violinist (1942–2013)

- Born: April 4, 1942 (Shenyang, China)
- Died: May 28, 2013 (aged 71) (Boston, United States)
- Other name: 潮田 益子
- Occupation: Violinist
- Spouse: Laurence Lesser

Masuko Ushioda (潮田 益子, Ushioda Masuko; Shenyang, April 4, 1942 - Boston, May 28, 2013) was a Japanese violinist who had an international career as soloist and teacher.

== Early life ==
Masuko Ushioda was born in Shenyang, Manchuria. Her parents were a well-educated, cosmopolitan couple: her father was a graduate of Waseda University who became an architect, and her mother was a folkloric dancer and choreographer. As it was her mother's dream for her two daughters to achieve independent lives as professionals, and since Western music was of great interest to her parents, Ushioda and her sister Fusa were introduced to musical instruments early on. Family lore says that in the aftermath of World War II the Ushiodas had little money and the reason for getting the young Ushioda a violin was because it was the cheapest instrument in the secondhand shop.

Her first important influence as a violinist came from Anna Bubnova-Ono – a pupil of the great Leopold Auer (teacher of Mischa Elman, Jascha Heifetz, Nathan Milstein, Efrem Zimbalist) – who had moved to Japan in the wake of the Russian Revolution and married the scientist Ono Shun’ichi, uncle of Yoko Ono. Ushioda's primary education was at Futaba, a very well known private school where the teachers were European nuns. She was already an accomplished violinist by the time she started high school at the Toho Gakuen School of Music. An important figure at Toho was Hideo Saito, and Ushioda – like many of her fellow students, such as Seiji Ozawa – was strongly influenced by his teachings.

== Career ==
At age 14, Ushioda received widespread attention by winning First Prize in the Mainichi Competition, the most prestigious event of that kind in Japan. This was followed by high school years in which she juggled many concerts and her musical studies at Toho. In 1961, the Russian violinist Mikhail Vaiman, who was well known in Japan, was asked to invite two young Japanese students to work with him at the Leningrad Conservatory as part of its centenary celebration. Ushioda and Teiko Maehashi went there that August. She stayed for more than two years.

Ushioda competed in the 1963 Queen Elisabeth Competition in Brussels and won sixth prize. She continued her studies afterwards with Joseph Szigeti in Switzerland, where he then lived. Her life there centered around her lessons and she immersed herself in yet another new culture. She was already very active as a soloist, primarily in Europe and Japan.

In 1966, she won silver medal in the Tchaikovsky Competition in Moscow. There, she met Laurence Lesser (fourth prize winner in cello), whom she married later on. As a result of her victory, Ushioda embarked on an international life as a violin soloist, while maintaining her link to Szigeti and “home” in Switzerland. She came to the U.S. for three summers beginning in 1967 to participate in the Marlboro Music Festival.

== Teaching and late career ==
In 1974, Ushioda and her husband Laurence Lesser were invited by then President Gunther Schuller to join the faculty of New England Conservatory. Over 39 years, Ushioda taught a total of 140 students at NEC.

Ushioda's late career was a balance of family, concertizing, and teaching. She made regular trips to Japan - for solo appearances and also as one of the concertmasters of the Saito Kinen Orchestra and the Mito Chamber Orchestra.

== Last Days ==
Ushioda's last trip to Japan, to play in Mito, was in October 2012. On November 6, 2012, shortly after her return home, she was given a diagnosis of acute leukemia. While battling this disease she still taught as much as possible, inviting students one-by-one for bedside lessons. She died at Beth Israel Deaconess Medical Center in Boston on May 28, 2013.

== Violins ==
Petrus Guarneri (of Venice) 1750. ‘Theodor’ Stradivarius 1690.

== Discography ==
Masuko Ushioda, N. Valter. Masuko Ushioda in Moscow. Shinsekai Record (SH-7670). LP.

Masuko Ushioda. J.S. Bach Sonatas & Partitas for Unaccompanied Violin – Complete. Toshiba (TA-72001-2), 1972. LP.

Masuko Ushioda, Tadashi Mori, Japan Philharmonic Symphony Orchestra. Tchaikovsky Concerto in D Major for Violin and Orchestra, Op. 35, and Bartok Concerto No. 2 for Violin and Orchestra. Columbia Records. LP.

Masuko Ushioda, Seiji Ozawa, Japan Philharmonic Symphony Orchestra - Sibelius Violin Concerto in D minor and Bruch Violin Concerto No. 1 in G minor. EMI Classics 1972 (CAPO-2009). CD

Masuko Ushioda. Ysaye Six Sonatas for Violin Solo, Op. 27. Fontec, 1995. CD.

Masuko Ushioda. J.S.Bach: Drei Sonaten und Drei Partiten für Violine Solo. Fontec, 1997. CD.

Masuko Ushioda, Seiji Ozawa, Mito Chamber Orchestra. Mozart Violin Concerto No. 5. Sony Music Japan International, Inc., 2007. CD.

Masuko Ushioda, Hideo Saito, Toho Gakuen Orchestra Prokofiev Violin Concerto No. 2; Joanna Kurkowicz, Dimitri Murrath, Sarah Darling, Natasha Brofsky, Laurence Lesser, Donald Palma, Stephen Drury., Stravinsky Apollo, Duo Concertant. Fontec, 2015. CD.

Masuko Ushioda, Tadashi Mori, ABC Symphony Orchestra, Glazunov Violin Concerto; Bartok Sonata for Solo Violi;, Stravinsky Divertimento, Stephen Drury. Fontec, 2015. CD.
