= London Firebird Orchestra =

British orchestra

London Firebird Orchestra is an orchestra based in central London, established in 2012 with Dame Judi Dench as Patron, and the pianist Marc Corbett-Weaver as Artistic Director. It comprises recent graduates and current students of the Royal College of Music, Royal Academy of Music, Guildhall School of Music and Drama and Trinity Laban Conservatoire of Music and Dance, and was set up with the aim to help young musicians at the start of their careers. The players collaborate intercollegiately, performing in live orchestral concerts and outreach projects to gain experience.

The orchestra plays regularly at its home venue St George's Hanover Square ("Handel's Church") in central London – and has performed several times at SJE Arts in Oxford and Kings Place in London.

In March 2026, the orchestra performed at St Johns Waterloo for the first time.

Past concerts have taken place at Royal Pump Room in Bath, St Paul's Covent Garden the Royal Festival Hall and the Queen Elizabeth Hall.

== Notable members ==
Conductors George Jackson and Michael Thrift regularly perform with the orchestra. The violinist Yury Revich has appeared as a soloist several times. Other regular soloists have included the pianists George Harliono and Martin James Bartlett, violinists Thomas Gould, Leonard Schreiber and Jennifer Pike, and cellists Aleksei Kiseliov and Raphael Wallfisch.
