= Ganbaatar =

Ganbaatar is a Mongolian given name. Notable people with the name include:

- Ariunbaatar Ganbaatar (born 1988), Mongolian baritone
- Sainkhüügiin Ganbaatar (born 1970), Mongolian politician
- Zandraa Ganbaatar, Mongolian Paralympic shooter
- A. Ganbaatar, Mongolian politician
