= Hideo Saito =

Hideo Saito may refer to:

- Hideo Saito (musician) (1902–1974)
- Hideo Saitō (musician, born 1958)
- Hideo Saito, one of the ring names of professional wrestler Mitsuhide Hirasawa, a.k.a. Captain New Japan
