= Anton Mordasov =

Russian pianist (born 1972)

Anton Mordasov (Russian: Антон Мордасов) is a Russian pianist, born in Novosibirsk in 1972.

Mordasov was a student at the Novosibirsk Music College under Mary Lebenzon. In 1990 he won the Rachmaninov International Piano Competition and shared the IX Tchaikovsky Competition's 3rd prize with Kevin Kenner and Johan Schmidt. Mordasov went on to study with Tatiana Nikolayeva and Sergi Dorensky at the Moscow's Tchaikovsky Conservatory of Music. In 1993 Mordasov made his New York city debut at Carnegie Hall performing Rachmaninov's Rhapsody on a theme of Paganini with the Moscow State Symphony conducted by Vladimir Ponkin. He subsequently settled in the USA, where he won the 1996 American Music Scholarship Association World Piano Competition in Cincinnati Ohio and during the same year placed 4th in the 26e Concours International de Musique de Montréal. Mordasov received critical acclaim for his February 1998 Recital at Alice Tully Hall part of Lincoln Center in New York City. In 2001 Mordasov placed 2nd in the New Orleans International Piano Competition. Mordasov also participated in the 1997 10th and 2001 11th Van Cliburn International Piano Competition. Mordasov taught in the preparatory department at Texas Christian University. He also teaches at Royal Music Academy in Plano, Texas.
