= Vadim Rudenko =

Vadim Leonidovich Rudenko
- Also known as: Krasnodar, USSR
- Born: December 8, 1967 (age 58)
- Origin: Moscow, Russia
- Genres: classical music
- Occupation: musician
- Instrument: piano

Vadim Leonidovich Rudenko (born 8 December 1967 in Krasnodar) is a Russian pianist.

While still a student at the Moscow Conservatory, he was a finalist at the XII Queen Elisabeth Competition and the XII Paloma O'Shea Competition in 1992. After graduating he took part in the X International Tchaikovsky Competition in 1994; with first prize being declared void he was awarded the third prize, ex-aequo with Hae-Sun Paik, behind Nikolai Lugansky. Four years later, Rudenko attained the XI edition's second prize.

== Biography ==
Vadim Rudenko was born on December 8, 1967, in Krasnodar. He began playing the piano at the age of four under the guidance of Nelly Mezhlumova. At the age of seven, Vadim gave his first solo concert.

In 1975, he was admitted to the Central Music School at the Moscow Conservatory in the class of A.D. Artobolevskaya, where his teachers also included V.V. Sukhanov and D.A. Bashkirov.

From 1989 to 1996, he studied at and successfully completed postgraduate studies at the Moscow State Tchaikovsky Conservatory under the guidance of Professor S.L. Dorensky. He also served in the army.

Since 1998, he has been a soloist of the Moscow State Academic Philharmonic.

At the age of 14, Vadim Rudenko became a laureate of the International Competition "Concertino Prague" (1982).

Rudenko has performed internationally since.

== Сreative activity ==
=== Collaboration with Conductors and Other Musicians ===
Over the years, Rudenko has collaborated with many renowned conductors and musicians, including Yuri Temirkanov, Vladimir Fedoseyev, Gennady Rozhdestvensky, Evgeny Svetlanov, Vladimir Sinaisky, Arnold Katz, Alexander Vedernikov, Yuri Simonov, Nikolai Alexeev, Yuri Bashmet, Mikhail Pletnev, Pavel Kogan, Veronika Dudarova, Andrei Boreyko, Dmitry Liss, Nikolai Alexeev, Mikhail Shcherbakov, Vladimir Ponykin, Vladimir Ziva, Ion Marin, and Vasily Sirenko..

=== Orchestras ===
The artist performs with both Russian and international orchestras in Russia, Europe, America, and Southeast Asia. He has collaborated with the Tchaikovsky State Symphony Orchestra, the State Academic Symphony Orchestra named after E.F. Svetlanov, the Russian National Orchestra, the Moscow State Academic Symphony Orchestra, the St. Petersburg Philharmonic Orchestra, the Bavarian Radio Orchestra, the Rotterdam Philharmonic, the Warsaw Philharmonic, the Prague Philharmonic, Radio France Orchestra, the Paris Symphony Orchestra, and the Japanese NHK.

=== Festivals ===
Rudenko has participated in festivals in Salzburg, La Roque d'Anthéron, Ruhr, Nantes (France), "Carinthian Summer" (Austria), Newport (USA), the Yehudi Menuhin Festival in Gstaad, the Summer Festival in Lugano (Switzerland), the P.I. Tchaikovsky Festival in Votkinsk, Warsaw, Risø (Norway), "Stars on Baikal" in Irkutsk, "Stars of the White Nights" in St. Petersburg, Crescendo, and many others in Russia and abroad.

== Teaching activities ==
The musician conducts master classes in Belgium, the Netherlands, France, Brazil, and Japan.

Since 2015, he has been teaching specialized piano at the Central Music School of the Moscow Conservatory.

Since 2024, he has been the director of the "Sirius" Secondary Specialized Music School.

== Achievements and awards ==
- 1982 — Laureate of the International Competition "Concertino Prague";
- 1991 — Laureate of the International Queen Elisabeth Music Competition (Brussels, Belgium), 8th prize;
- 1992 — Laureate of the International Paloma O'Shea Piano Competition (Santander, Spain);
- 1993 — Laureate of the International G.B. Viotti Competition (Vercelli, Italy);
- 1994 — Laureate of the International P.I. Tchaikovsky Competition (Moscow, Russia), 3rd prize;
- 1998 — Laureate of the International P.I. Tchaikovsky Competition (Moscow, Russia), 2nd prize;
- 2005 — Laureate of the International S. Richter Piano Competition (Moscow, Russia), 4th prize.
