= Nina Beilina =

Russian violinist and academic (1937–2018)

Nina Beilina (4 March 1937 – 25 November 2018) was a Russian concert violinist and academic, in later years living in the USA.

== Life ==
Nina Mikhaylovna Beilina was born in Moscow in 1937. At age five she began playing the violin, studying with Abram Yampolsky; she later studied at the Moscow Conservatory with David Oistrakh.

She won first prize at the Enescu Competition in 1961, came joint third at the International Tchaikovsky Competition in 1962, and won the Grand Prix at the Long-Thibaud-Crespin Competition. She performed in the Soviet Union, in Eastern Europe and in South America.

After the death of her husband, conductor Israel Chudnovsky, she moved to the US in 1977, with her son Emil Chudnovsky (who became a violinist and violin teacher). Her formal debut was in New York in January 1978; the critic Harold C. Schonberg wrote, " Whatever she touched came out with incredible polish, assurance and, when needed, brilliance".

She was professor of violin at the Mannes School of Music in New York from 1978 to 2017, and she performed in the US and internationally. In 1988 she founded the chamber orchestra Bachanalia, which gave up to six concerts a year.

Nina Beilina died in Manhattan in 2018, aged 81.
