= Nikolai Lugansky =

Russian pianist (born 1972)

Nikolai Lugansky PAR
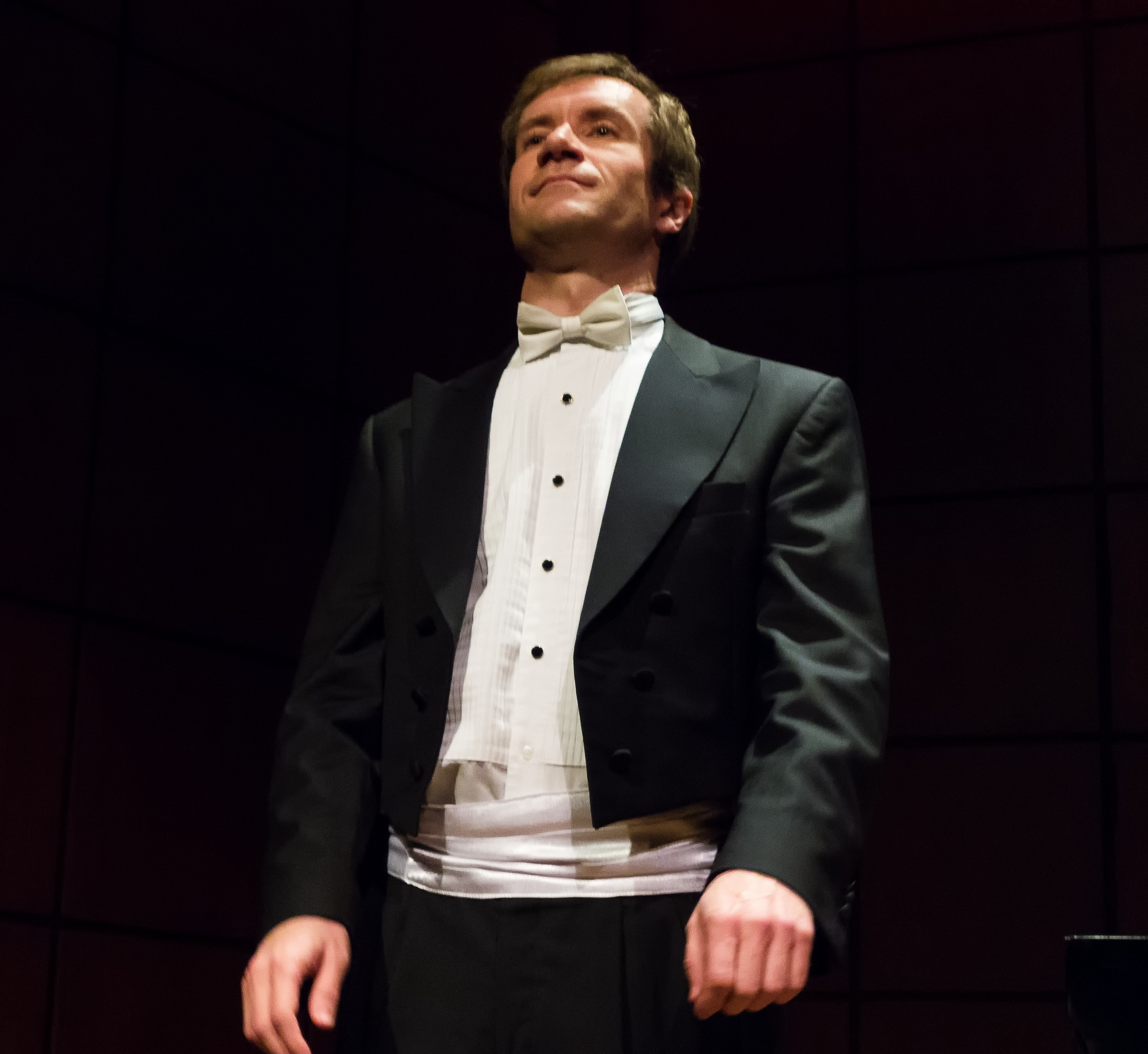
- Nikolai Lugansky in 2012

Background information
- Born: 26 April 1972 (age 54); Moscow, Russian SFSR, Soviet Union
- Genres: Classical music
- Occupation: Pianist
- Instrument: piano
- Label: Harmonia Mundi
- Website: nikolaylugansky.com

Nikolai Lvovich Lugansky (Russian: Никола́й Льво́вич Луга́нский; born 26 April 1972) is a Russian pianist. He regularly performs with leading orchestras and conductors and records for labels including Warner Classics and Harmonia Mundi.

== Early life and education ==
Nikolai Lugansky was born on 26 April 1972 in Moscow, Russia, to research scientist parents. At the age of five, before he had learned to read music, he played a Beethoven piano sonata learned completely by ear. He studied piano at the Moscow Central Music School and the Moscow Conservatory. His teachers included Tatiana Kestner, Tatiana Nikolayeva and Sergei Dorensky.

== Career ==
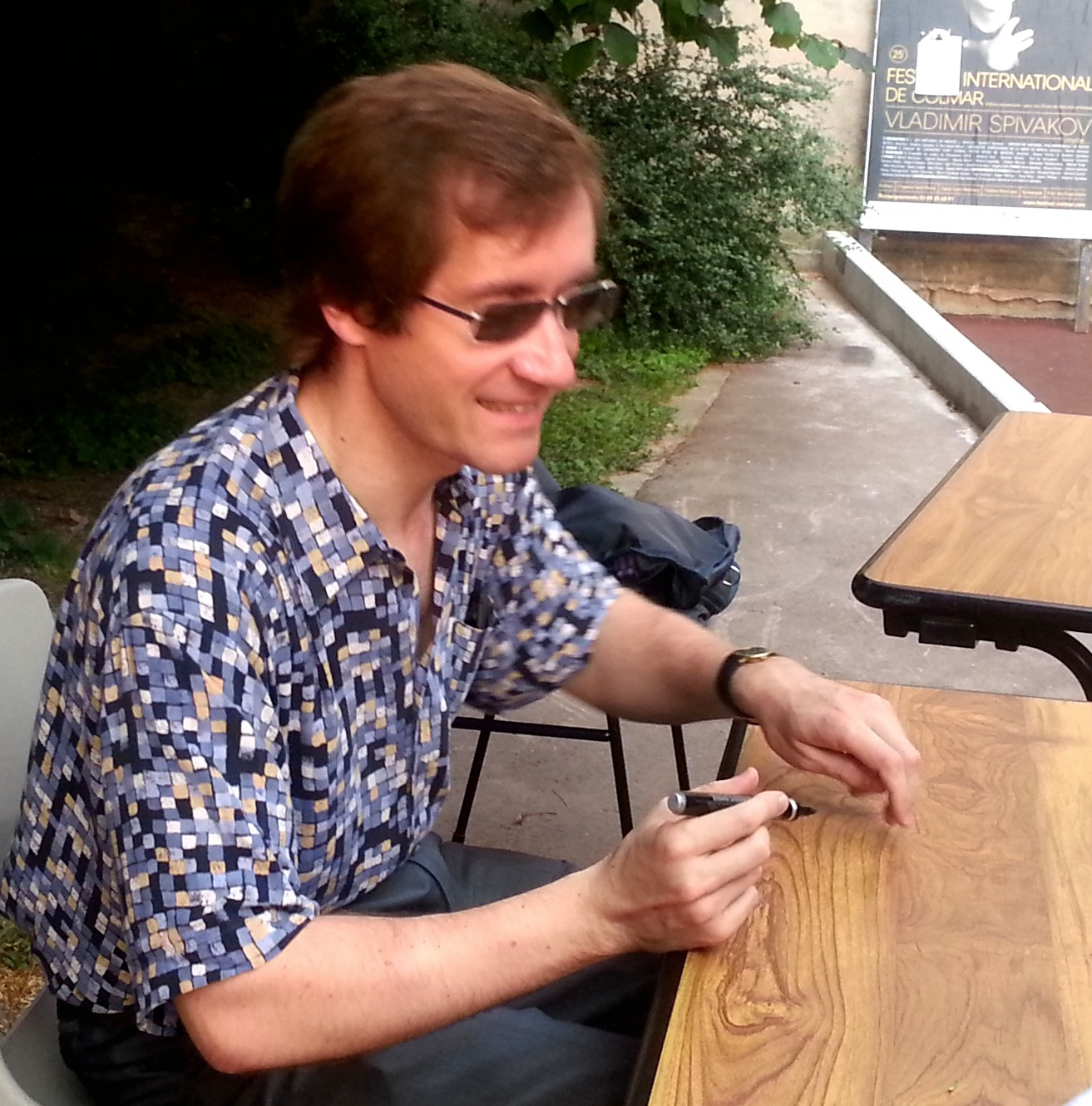
Lugansky in 2013

During the 1980s and early 1990s, Lugansky won prizes at numerous piano competitions, most notably the silver medal at the Tchaikovsky International Piano Competition in 1994 (no first prize was awarded). At the same time he began to make recordings on the Melodiya (USSR) and Vanguard Classics (Netherlands) labels. His performance at the Winners' Gala Concert of the 10th International Tchaikovsky Competition was recorded and released on the Pioneer Classics label, on both CD and video laser disc formats. This was followed by more recordings for Japanese labels. He went on to make recordings for Warner Classics, Erato Records, PENTATONE, Onyx Classics, Deutsche Grammophon, and Naïve Records. In 2018, Lugansky signed an exclusive recording contract with Harmonia Mundi.

Lugansky has performed together with Vadim Repin, Alexander Kniazev, Anna Netrebko, Joshua Bell, Yuri Bashmet, Vadim Rudenko, Eliso Virsaladze, Mischa Maisky and Leonidas Kavakos, among others. He has collaborated with conductors such as Riccardo Chailly, Christoph Eschenbach, Vladimir Fedoseyev, Valery Gergiev, Neeme Järvi, Kurt Masur, Mikhail Pletnev, Gennady Rozhdestvensky, Yuri Simonov, Leonard Slatkin, Tugan Sokhiev, Vladimir Spivakov, Yevgeny Svetlanov, Yuri Temirkanov and Edo de Waart.

He is an Honorary Member of the Russian Academy of Arts since 2012.

In addition to performing and recording, Lugansky teaches at the Moscow Conservatory.

== Personal life ==
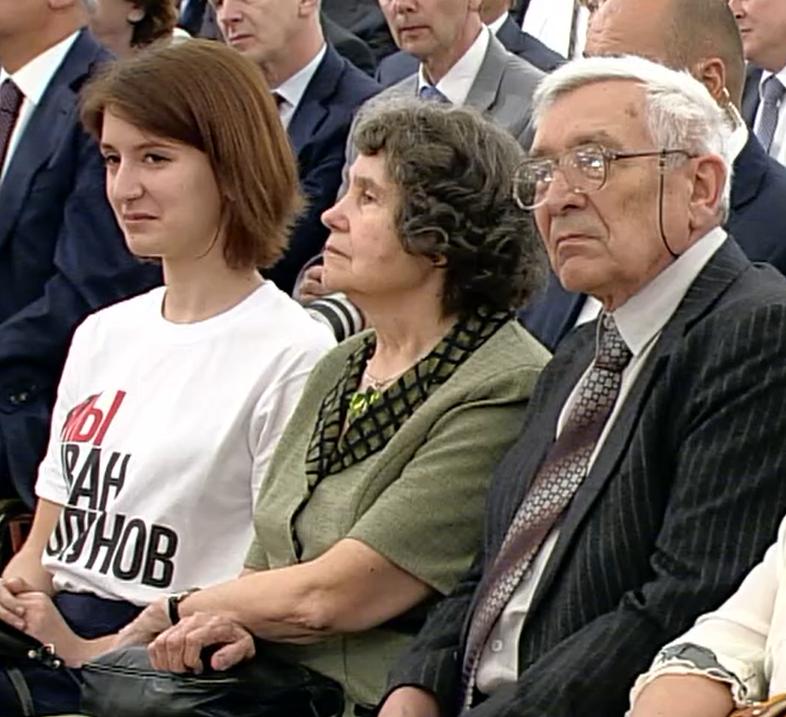
Lugansky's daughter Anna wearing an “I/WE = IVAN GOLUNOV” shirt in protest at an awards ceremony, with her grandparents

Lugansky lives in Moscow with his wife and three children. His daughter, Anna Luganskaya, is a journalist who openly protested Vladimir Putin at an awards ceremony featuring her father, wearing a shirt with the slogan "I/WE = IVAN GOLUNOV". Golunov, a fellow journalist, was arrested in 2019 on what were widely believed to be fabricated drug charges. Her act of protest was seen as a bold stance against the suppression of press freedom in Russia and drew both national and international attention.

== Awards ==
Competition prizes

- First Prize, All-Union Competition in Tbilisi (1988)
- Silver Medal, 8th International Bach Competition in Leipzig (1988)
- Second Prize, Rachmaninov Competition in Moscow (1990)
- Best pianist, International Summer Academy "Mozarteum" in Salzburg, Austria (1992)
- Silver Medal, 10th International Tchaikovsky Competition in Moscow (1994)

Other awards

- Ernest Neizvestny Private Charity Fund Award (1994)
- International Terence Judd Award (1995)
- Diapason d'Or (2000, 2001 and 2002)
- Preis der deutschen Schallplattenkritik (2003)
- Named "Honoured Citizen of Ivanovka" in Tambov, Russia (2004)
- Named "Honoured Artist of the Russian Federation" (2005)
- Echo Klassik Award (2005)
- Echo Klassik Award (2007)
- BBC Music Magazine Award (2011)
- Echo Klassik Award (2013)
- People's Artist of Russia (2013)
- Sergei Rachmaninov International Award (2016)
- State Prize of the Russian Federation (2019)
