= Vladimir Mischouk =

Russian classical pianist (born 1968)

Vladimir Mischouk Владимир Мищук Merited Artist of the Russian Federation
- Born: 13 January 1968 (age 58); Saint Petersburg, Russia
- Genres: Classical music
- Occupation: Pianist
- Instrument: piano

Vladimir Mischouk (Russian: Владимир Валерьевич Мищук; born 1968 in Saint Petersburg) is a Russian classical pianist, Honoured Artist of Russia.

== Career ==
The pianist entered in 1975 at the Music School of the Saint Petersburg Conservatory in the class of Valentina Kunde. In 1990 he won the 2nd prize at the Tchaikovsky International Competition, as well as the "Rosina Lhévinne" special prize.

Vladimir Mischouk gives more than 100 concerts annually in Russia, United States, countries of Europe and Asia. Vladimir Mischouk performs with world-known orchestras. Vladimir Mischouk teaches at the St.Petersburg Rimsky-Korsakov Conservatoire and since 2009 is also professor at the International Piano Academy Lake Como. The pianist has recorded more than 10 CDs in Russia and abroad.
