= Seiji Ozawa Matsumoto Festival =

The Seiji Ozawa Matsumoto Festival (セイジ・オザワ 松本フェスティバル, Seiji Ozawa Matsumoto Fesutibaru, OMF), formerly known as the Saito Kinen Festival Matsumoto (サイトウ・キネン・フェスティバル松本, Saitō Kinen Fesutibaru Matsumoto, SKF), is an annual classical music festival held in August and September in Matsumoto, Nagano, Japan, founded in 1992 by conductor Seiji Ozawa.

The festival's resident orchestra is the renowned Saito Kinen Orchestra.
