= Saito Kinen Orchestra =

Japanese orchestra

The Saito Kinen Orchestra is an orchestra formed annually during the Saito Kinen Festival Matsumoto, which is held every August and September in Matsumoto city, Nagano, Japan. The orchestra is managed by the Saito Kinen Foundation.

== History ==
In September 1984, under the leadership of Seiji Ozawa and Kazuyoshi Akiyama, a group of Japanese musicians from all over the world gathered together in Japan to perform a series of concerts in commemoration of the 10th anniversary of the death of Hideo Saito—co-founder of the Toho Gakuen School of Music and mentor to those conductors and musicians. The series of memorial concerts performed in Tokyo and Osaka became the beginning of the career of the Saito Kinen Orchestra.

In the beginning of the orchestra's establishment, its members would consist of Saito's former students who agreed with Ozawa and Akiyama that they should assemble in Japan for the memorial concerts. At first they performed without payment.

In 1987 the Orchestra made its first tour of Europe in Vienna, Berlin, Frankfurt, Paris, and London. Between 1989 and 1991, it toured in Europe and America. In 1990 the orchestra was invited to the Salzburg Festival.

In May 1992, the Saito Kinen Foundation was established. In September of the same year, the Saito Kinen Festival Matsumoto was held for the first time. As well as activities for the annual Festival such as performing symphonies, operas and vocal compositions, and holding musician tutorials, the orchestra has also performed concerts in Tokyo.

Since the Saito Kinen Orchestra is an orchestra formed annually, there are no regular members. It originally consisted of Saito's former students and the graduates from the Toho Gakuen School of Music. However, as the original members age, the orchestra has been adding new members, among them Ozawa's former students and friends.

In 2008, the Orchestra was voted the world's 19th greatest orchestra by a panel of critics assembled by Gramophone Magazine, a UK-based leading classical music magazine.

== Recordings ==
The orchestra has recorded symphonies by Beethoven, Brahms, Tchaikovsky and Mahler. Its other recordings are of Stravinsky's Oedipus rex, and the St Matthew Passion and Mass in B minor by J.S. Bach. Those recordings are done for Philips Records and Sony Music.

== Music directors ==
The current and former directors are:

- Seiji Ozawa (General Director), Kazuyoshi Akiyama, Taijiro Iimori, Tatsuya Shimono

== Orchestra musicians ==
A list of the current and former players:

- Flute: Shigenori Kudo, Sébastian Jacot, Jacques Zoon, Kazuhiro Iwasa, Kazuo Tokito
- Oboe: Fumiaki Miyamoto, Philippe Tondre, Katsuya Watanabe, Björn Vestre
- Bassoon: Dag Jensen, Malte Refardt
- French horn: Nobuyuki Mizuno, Radek Baborák
- Timpani: Vic Firth, Don Liuzzi, Rainer Seegers
- Percussion: Koji Fukamachi, Satoshi Takeshima, Mika Takehara, Sawako Yasue
- Harp: Naoko Yoshino, Risako Hayakawa
- Violin: Tōru Yasunaga, Yasushi Toyoshima, Tatsuya Yabe, Takumi Komoriya, Masuko Ushioda, Syoko Aki, Machie Oguri, Tadashi Hori, Kyoko Shikata, Jennifer Gilbert, Hiroyuki Yamaguchi,
- Viola: Mazumi Tanamura, Nobuko Imai, Naoko Shimizu, Tomomi Shinozaki, Yoshiko Kawamoto, Manabu Suzuki, Kota Nagahara, Machiko Shimada, Masaya Soshi
- Cello: Tsuyoshi Tsutsumi, Kenichiro Yasuda, Ko Iwasaki, Nobuo Furukawa, Yo Kigoshi, Sumiko Kurata, Ole Akahoshi
- Double bass: Yasunori Kawahara, Hiroshi Ikematsu, Akihiro Adachi, Shigeru Ishikawa, Akira Akahoshi, Rainer Zepperitz
