= Hirofumi Kanno =

Japanese classical cellist

- Born: Japan Tokyo
- Other name: 菅野博文
- Occupation: cellist

Hirofumi Kanno (菅野博文) (born 1947 in Tokyo, Japan) is a classical cellist.

== Biography ==
Hirofumi Kanno was born in Tokyo in 1947, began lessons with Hideo Saito (musician) at the age of seven and continued with him at the Toho Gakuen School of Music. On his graduation in 1970, he went to study with Pierre Fournier in Switzerland and, two years later, with Janos Starker at Indiana University. In 1975 Kanno became Starker's assistant.

During this time Kanno continued to follow his solo career and in 1974 was awarded third prize in the International Tchaikovsky Competition.

- He won 1st prize in 1969 The 38 Japan Music Competition.
- He won 3rd prize in 1974 The 5 International Tchaikovsky Competition.
- In 1975, he held his debut recital in Japan.
- In 1976, after serving as an assistant professor at the University of Kentucky, Lexington, he became an associate professor at Temple University in Philadelphia .
- As a member of Chestnut Hills Resident Trio, Faculty Trio [7], and Temple Trio [8], he has performed mainly in the United States .
- Based in Japan since 1981. He is one of Japan's leading cellists, and has produced numerous musicians, both as instructors and cellists.
- He used the famous Joseph Guarnerius [9] (produced in 1689), which is owned by the Showa Academia Musicae (Showa College of Music).
- He belonged to the Kioi Sinfonietta Tokyo [10] and the Kioi Hall Chamber Orchestra [11] .
- Professor emeritus at Showa Academia Musicae (Showa College of Music).
- In recent years, he has frequently collaborated with violinist Gerard Poulet and pianist Gen Tomuro . [12]

== links ==
菅野博文
