= Johan Schmidt =

Belgian pianist

Johan Schmidt (born 5 October 1964) is a Belgian pianist.

He won the Maria Callas Competition in Athens, and was prized at the Queen Elisabeth (1987, 4th prize plus Audience prize), Tchaikovsky (1990, 3rd prize - ex-aequo with Kevin Kenner and Anton Mordasov) and Van Cliburn (1993, 4th prize) competitions. In addition, in 1995 he was awarded the Leonardo da Vinci International Art Award from the Rotary International.

Schmidt has performed internationally, both as a concert pianist and a chamber musician. He has taught at the Royal Conservatory in Mons and currently teaches at the Royal Conservatory in Brussels.
