= Leonardo da Vinci International Award =

The Leonardo da Vinci International Award (Italian: Premio Internazionale Leonardo da Vinci) is an annual international prize named after Leonardo da Vinci, to award outstanding achievement by young people involved in the study of the sciences, technology, literature and the arts. Among the disciplines recognised and rewarded so far have been painting, sculpture, music, geology, architecture, medicine and nuclear physics. Its previous laureates include musicians Evelyn Glennie and Leonidas Kavakos.

== History ==
The Leonardo da Vinci International Award was founded in 1975 by the Rotary Club of Florence in collaboration with the Athens, Tours and Wien-Ring Rotary Clubs.

Since its foundation, seven more European Rotary clubs have joined the initiative:

- 1981: Madrid
- 1983: Brussels
- 1984: London
- 1984: Würzburg
- 1989: Amsterdam
- 2006: Dublin
- 2017: Copenhagen

As of July 2020, eleven Rotary Clubs in Europe participate in this award ceremony: Florence, Tours, Vienna, Athens, Madrid, Würzburg, Brussels, Amsterdam, London, Dublin and Copenhagen.

== Ceremonies ==
Winners of the Leonardo da Vinci International Award
| Year | Place | Winner | Subject |
|---|---|---|---|
| 1975 | Firenze – Palazzo Vecchio | Ben Long | Painting |
| 1976 | Tours – Château Amboise | Jean Guillaume | Art History |
| 1977 | Athens – Aula Magna | Stravos Valasakis and Constantinos Palaiologos | Sculpture |
| 1978 | Vienna – Schwarzenberg Palace | Otto Prohaska | Medicine |
| 1979 | Firenze – Palazzo Vecchio | Alberto Bologni | Music |
| 1980 | Tours – Chateau Artigny | Claude Naudion | Medicine |
| 1981 | Madrid – Aula Magna | Ferdinando López Vera | Geology |
| 1982 | Athens – Senate | Dimitris Sgouros | Music |
| 1983 | Vienna – Schwarzenberg Palace | Ingeborg Hochmair | Medicine |
| 1984 | Firenze – Palazzo Vecchio | Giovanni Buonvicini | Physics |
| 1985 | Tours – Ockeghem Center | Patrick Blettery | Architecture |
| 1986 | Bruxelles – Palais | Baidyanath Misra and Yves Elskens | Physics |
| 1987 | London – Barbican | Evelyn Glennie | Music |
| 1988 | Würzburg – Residenz | Dietrich Lorke | Medicine |
| 1989 | Madrid – Escorial | Julián Agut Sánchez | Medicine |
| 1990 | Amsterdam – Niewe Kerk | Joost van den Toorn | Sculpture |
| 1991 | Athens – Herodus Theater | Leonidas Kavakos | Music |
| 1992 | Vienna – Prunksaal | Helmut Deubner | Architecture, Ecology |
| 1993 | Tours – Commerce School | Frédéric Patat | Astrophysics |
| 1994 | Firenze – Palazzo Vecchio | Fabrizio Rossi Prodi | Architecture |
| 1995 | Brussels – Royal Belge | Johan Schmidt | Music |
| 1996 | London – Buckingham Palace | Joana Quinn | Animate Drawer |
| 1997 | Würzburg – Marienberg Fort | Klaus Ospald | Music |
| 1998 | Madrid – Jardines Rodriguez | Eig Omada | Design |
| 1999 | Amsterdam – The Old Church | Benoît Hermans | Sculpture |
| 2000 | Athens – Old Parliament | Nikos Frantzolas | Painting |
| 2001 | Vienna – University of Vienna | Renate Motschnig | Mathematics |
| 2002 | Tours – Palais des Congress | Frédéric Brochet | Enology |
| 2003 | Firenze – Palazzo Vecchio | Roberto Vittori | Astronaut |
| 2004 | Brussels – Palais des Académies | Françoise Rosier | Restoration |
| 2005 | London – Goldsmiths Company | Sidsel Dorph-Jensen | Silver Designer |
| 2006 | Würzburg – Residenz | Rebecca Basile | Biology |
| 2007 | Madrid – Casa de Correos | Emilio Benito García | Emergency System Organization |
| 2008 | Amsterdam – Concert Hall | Ties Rijcken | Architecture |
| 2009 | Athens – Parliament | Dionysis Grammenos | Music |
| 2010 | Vienna – University of Vienna | Julius Brennecke | Medicine |
| 2011 | Dublin – Trinity College | David OReilly (artist) | Animation |
| 2012 | Tours – Grand Theatre | Nicolas Monmarché | Computer science |
| 2013 | Firenze – Palazzo Vecchio | Nicola Salvioli | Restoration |
| 2014 | Brussels – Palais des Académies | Monique Weis | History |
| 2015 | London – Goldsmiths’ Hall | John Saunders | Medicine |
| 2016 | Würzburg – LMU Munich | Stephan Bush | Engineering |
| 2017 | Madrid – Real Academia Espanola de Lengua | Guillermo García-Calvo | Music |
| 2018 | Amsterdam – Rijksmuseum | Boyan Slat | Technology |
| 2019 | Firenze – Palazzo Vecchio | Simona Crea | Robotics |
| 2021 | Vienna – Palais Todesco | Alma Deutscher | Music |
| 2022 | Copenhagen | | |
| 2023 | Dublin | Dr Shane Bergin | Physics |
| 2024 | Tours | Marie-Anita Gaube | Painting |
| 2025 | Athens | Varvara-Antigoni Athinaiou | Classical Music, Trompone |
