= Jane Peters =

Australian violinist (born 1963)

Jane Peters (born 1963) is an Australian classical violinist and Arts Ambassador for Australia.

== Early life ==
In 1963, Peters was born in Adelaide, Australia. Peters' father is a retired GP and her mother studied Botany.

== Career ==
At age 10, Peters performed as a violinist on stage.

At twelve Peters won a medal in France and performed on Australian TV. In 1982 she received her B.A. and her teacher in Adelaide was Lyndall Hendrickson. In 1986 she won the Bronze Medal at the International Tchaikovsky Competition. Peters has been an Arts Ambassador for Australia.

== Personal life ==
Peters has a daughter named Emma. As of 2017, Peters resides in Rouen, Normandy, France.
