= Ariunbaatar Ganbaatar =

Mongolian baritone

Ariunbaatar Ganbaatar (Mongolian: Ганбаатарын Ариунбаатар; born April 8, 1988) is a Mongolian baritone. He was born as the middle child in a family of 3 at the west of Ulan-Bator city, where his family used to live as nomads. He attended the Mongolian State University of Culture and the Arts and graduated in 2010 as an opera singer. He subsequently became a traffic warden in Ulan-Bator until he joined the Buryat National Opera in Ulan-Ude, Russia, in 2014.

== Career ==
He won the first prize in the male vocalist category and the Grand Prix at the 2015 International Tchaikovsky Competition. In 2015, Ariunbaatar performed at the Bolshoi Theatre in Moscow, at the Cadogan Hall in London, and at Carnegie Hall in New York. He sang Yeletsky's Aria from Tchaikovsky's The Queen of Spades at Buckingham Palace. During 2016, he performed the roles of Escamillo (Carmen) and Baron Scarpia (Tosca) at the Mariinsky Theatre in Saint Petersburg. He also performed for the 60th General Assembly of the World Federation of International Music Competitions in Yerevan, Armenia. He was jointly awarded the Song Prize award at the 2017 BBC Cardiff Singer of the World competition, singing Rossini, Verdi, and Tchaikovsky, and in Mongolian.

== Honors ==
In 2016, on the occasion of the 854th birth anniversary of Genghis Khan which is marked as the National Pride Day, the top state prize of Mongolia, the Order of Genghis Khan, was awarded to Ganbaatar for his many great awards and achievements on the international stage.
