= Alexander Kniazev =

Russian cellist and organist

- Александр Князев
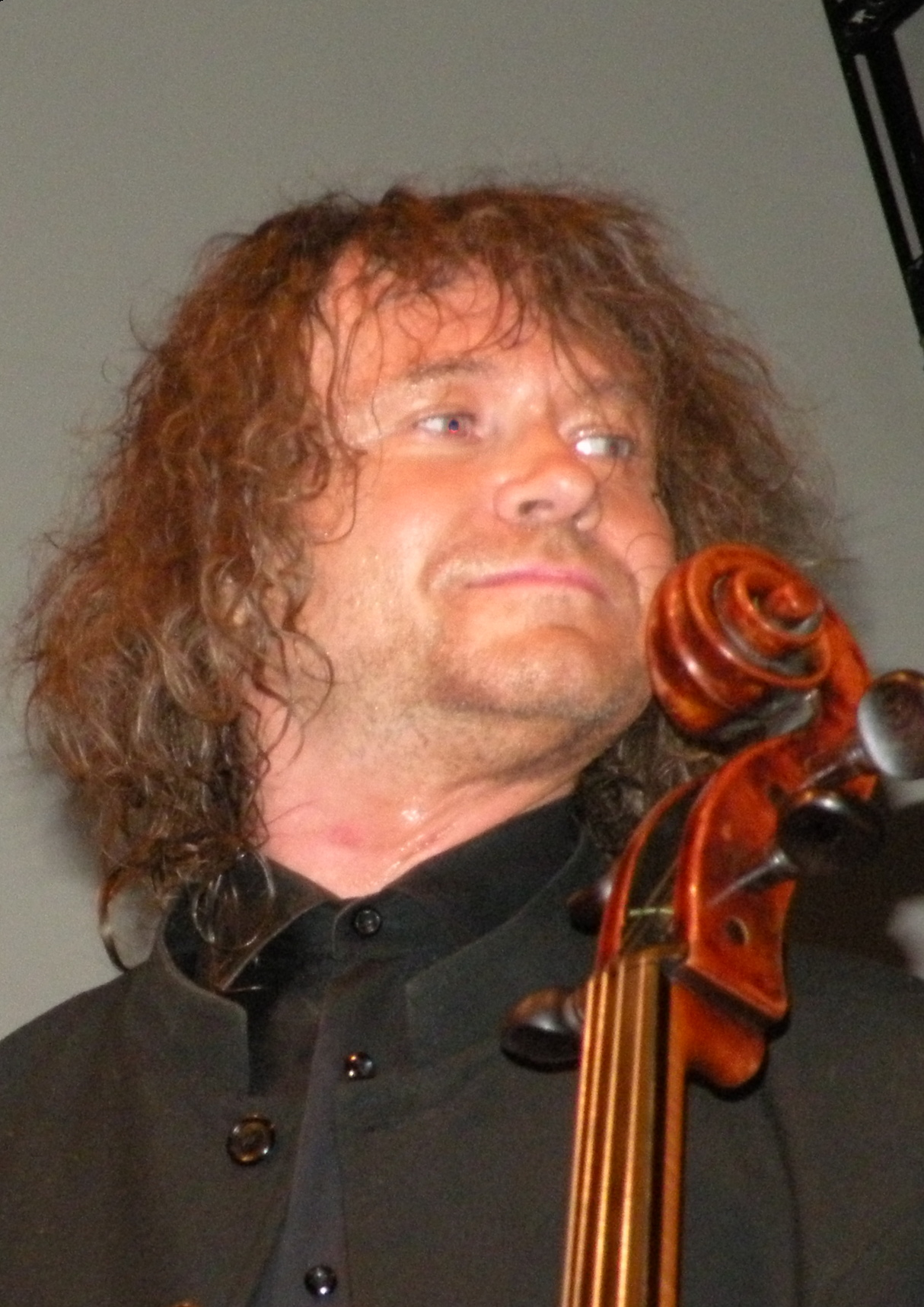
- Kniazev in 2009
- Born: April 26, 1961 (age 65); Moscow
- Education: Moscow Conservatory
- Occupations: Cellist, organist

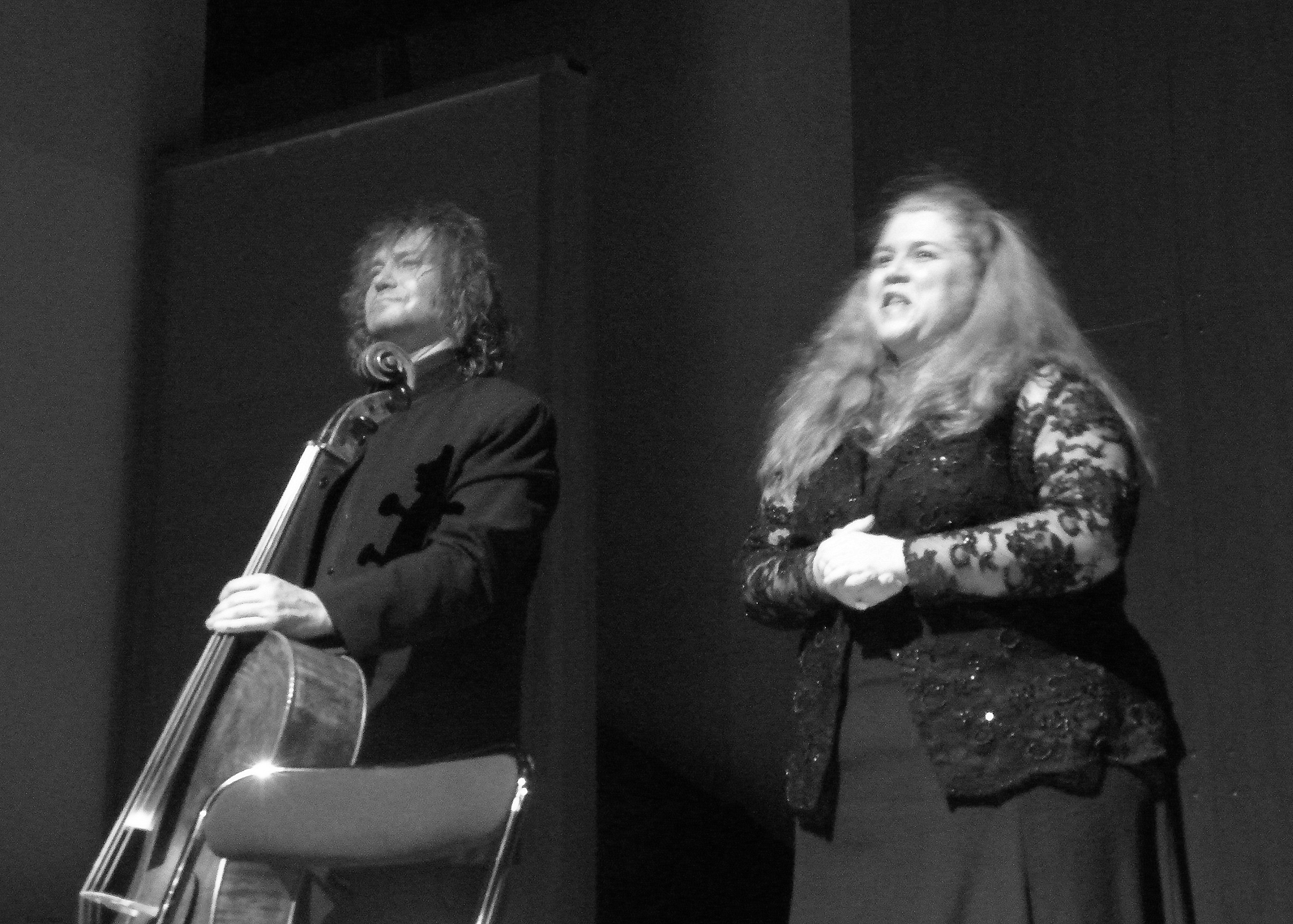
Alexandre Kniazev and Plamena Mangova, during la Folle Journée, 2009.

Alexandre Alexandrovitch Kniazev (Russian: Александр Александрович Князев; born 26 April 1961) is a Russian cellist and organist. He was named best musician of the year in Russia in 1999.

Kniazev studied music at Moscow Conservatory.

He entered the cello class of Alexander Fedorchenko and in the organ class of G. Kozlova.

After a solid musical formation, he won first prizes in cello at the Vilnius competition, at that of G. Cassado, the International Chamber Music Competition in Trapani and UNISA International Competition Pretoria. He also won the third prize of the International Tchaikovsky Competition of Moscow.

He then performed all over the world and realized many records, two of which were awarded.

== Discography ==
- J. Brahms: Piano Trio No. 3 in C minor op. 101 no.3, Piano Quartet No. 3 in C minor op. 60 no.3 Suoni e Colori (1999)
- F. Chopin: Cello sonata in G minor op. 65
- J. Brahms: Four serious songs for baritone and piano (arr. Kniazev)
- R. Schumann: Three Fantasies, Pieces op. 73
- J. Guillou: Fantasia Concertante for cello and organ
- J. S. Bach: Cello Suites (1999)
- J. S. Bach: Chaconne for Partita No. 2 in D minor for violin (2000)
- L. Beethoven: Violin sonata No. 5 in F major op. 24 "Spring"
- F. Schubert: Duet for violin and piano in A major op. 162 D574
- J. Brahms: Scherzo for violin and piano "F.A.E. Sonata" (2001)
- J. Brahms: Piano Quartet No. 1 in G minor op. 25 no. 1
- J. Brahms: Clarinet Trio in A minor op. 114 (2001)
- M. Reger: Four Sonatas for Cello and Piano (2001)
- J. S. Bach: Cello Suites (2004)
- S. Rachmaninov: Trio "elegiaque" No. 2 in D minor op. 9
- D. Shostakovich: Piano Trio No. 2 in E minor op. 67 (2005)
- P. I. Tchaikovsky: Variations on a Rococo Theme, Andante cantabile, Nocturne in E minor
- P. I. Tchaikovsky: Twelve Romances (2005)
- F. Chopin: Cello sonata in G minor op. 65
- S. Rachmaninov: Cello Sonata in G minor op.19
- S. Rachmaninov: Vocalise op.34 n.14 (2006)

=== External links ===
- Alexander Kniazev
- Alexander Kniazev on Homestead.com
- Alexander Kniazev on Mariinsky Theatre
- Alexander Kniazev (Cello, Organ) on Bach Cantatas Website
- News - cello - Alexander Kniazev on The XV International Tchaikovsky Competition
- Brahms - Sonata no.1 op.38 - Alexander Kniazev & Andrei Korobeinikov on YouTube
