= Sergei Dorensky =

Russian musician (1931–2020)

Sergei Leonidovich Dorensky
- Сергей Леонидович Доренский
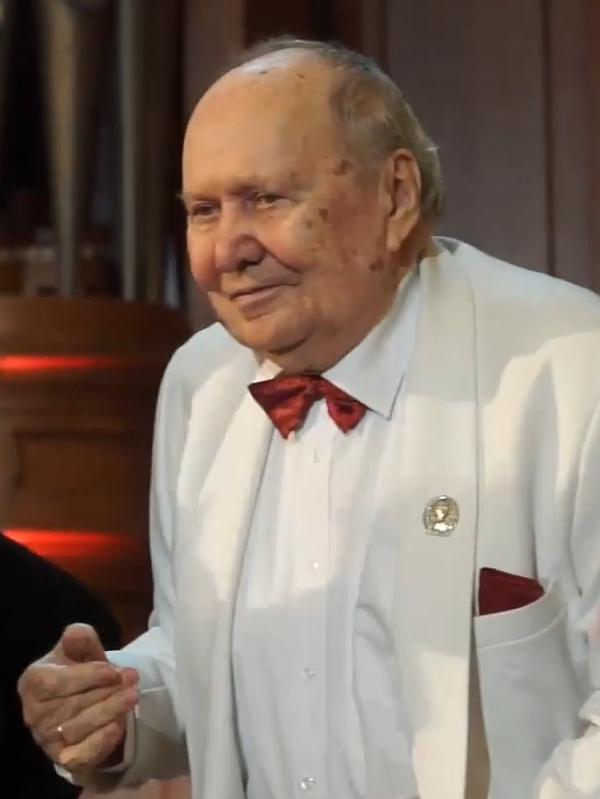
- Sergei Dorensky in 2016
- Born: December 3, 1931
- Died: February 26, 2020 (aged 88)
- Education: Moscow Conservatory
- Occupation: Pianist

Sergei Leonidovich Dorensky (Russian: Серге́й Леони́дович Доре́нский; 3 December 1931 – 26 February 2020) was a Russian pianist.

He trained under Grigory Ginsburg at the Moscow Conservatory. Dorensky was awarded a gold medal at the 5th World Festival of Youth and Students and the 1957 Rio de Janeiro Competition's 2nd prize, which allowed him to perform throughout Western Europe and America.

That same year he was appointed a teacher at the Moscow Conservatory, where he held a professorship from 1978 until 1997. He taught many notable pianists, including Nikolai Lugansky, Denis Matsuev, Alexander Shtarkman, Olga Kern, Feodor Amirov, Andrei Pisarev and Ramzi Yassa. He served on the jury of the Paloma O'Shea Santander International Piano Competition in 1978, 1980, 1982, 1984 and 1992. He was named a People's Artist of Russia in 1989, and was decorated with the Order of Friendship eight years later. He was the Russian Fryderyk Chopin and Sergey Rachmaninov Societies' vice-president.
