= Dmitry Masleev =

Russian pianist (born 1988)

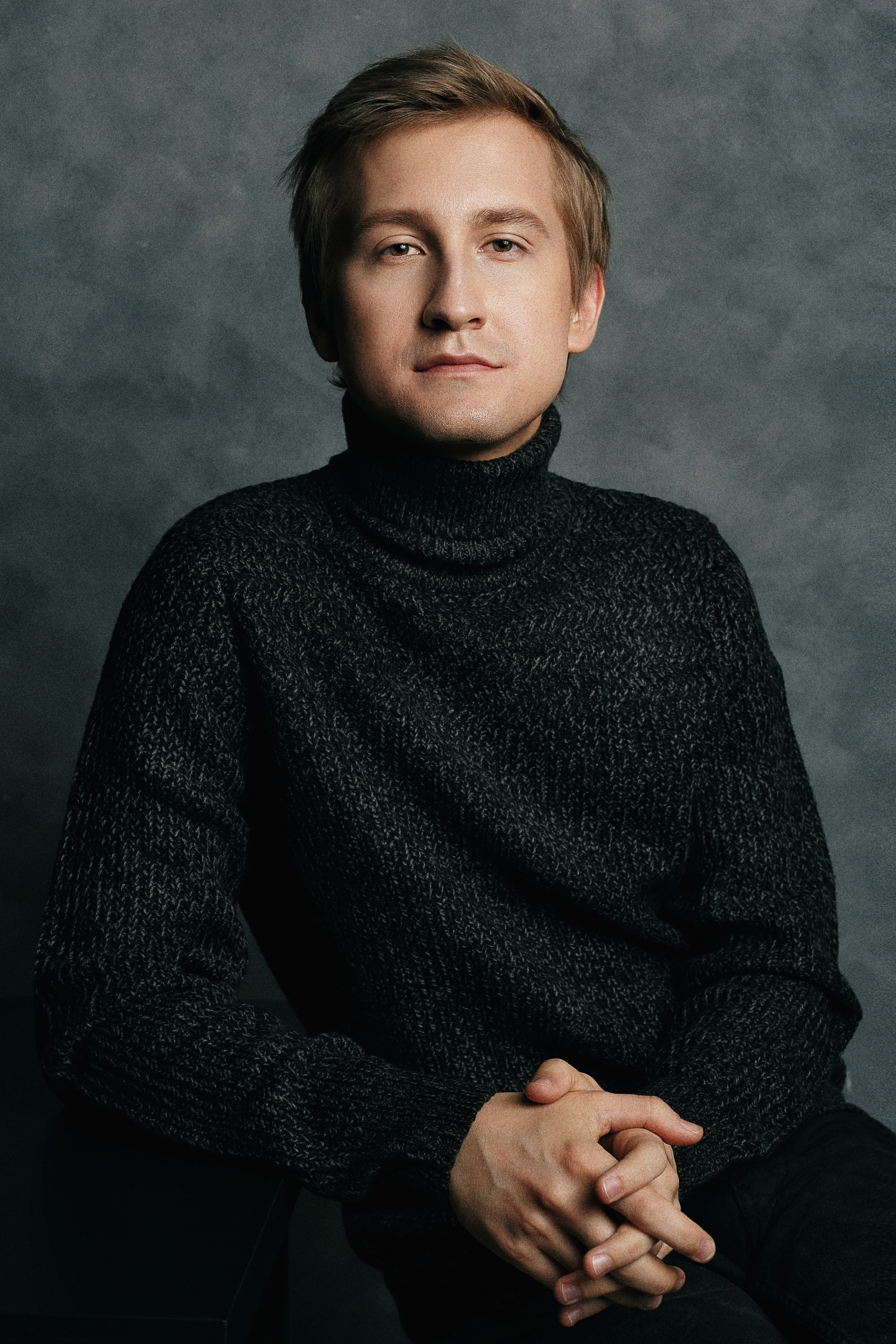

Background information
- Born: May 4, 1988 (age 37); Ulan-Ude, Russia
- Genres: Classical
- Instrument: Piano
- Website: dmitry-masleev.com/en/

Dmitry Vladimirovich Masleev (Russian: Дми́трий Влади́мирович Масле́ев; born May 4, 1988) is a Russian pianist.

== Early life and education ==
Masleev was born on May 4, 1988, in Ulan-Ude, a Siberian city between Lake Baikal and the Mongolian border. He was educated at the Moscow Conservatory in the class of Professor Mikhail Petukhov, and at the Lake Como International Piano Academy in Italy.

== Career ==
Masleev won the 7th Adilia Alieva piano competition in Gaillard, France (2010), The 21st Chopin Premio Piano competition in Rome (2011), Antonio Napolitano competition in Salerno (2013), 3rd prize in the 2nd Russian Music Competition in Moscow (2014), and the International Tchaikovsky Competition (2015) where he won the First Prize and Gold Medal as well as a special award for the best performance of the concerto with chamber orchestra in the second round, where he performed Mozart's Piano Concerto No. 20 in D minor, K. 466.

Masleev has performed in such countries as Russia, Japan, US, Italy, China, and England, and has collaborated with such conductors as Valery Gergiev and Yevgeny Svetlanov. In January 2017, Carnegie Hall presented Masleev's highly anticipated debut at the Isaac Stern Auditorium with a recital programme featuring works by Scarlatti, Beethoven, Liszt, Rachmaninoff and Prokofiev. In the 2016–17 season he also performed in Paris twice: at the Philharmonie de Paris and the Fondation Louis Vuitton.

In his first touring season Masleev made a series of successful debuts, establishing his world-wide audience and developing his profile as a "future great pianist" (La Croix) of "virtuoso brilliance" (The Financial Times), "musicality of metaphysical proportions" (Neue Musikzeitung), "discovery of a new and real talent" (Classic Toulouse), portraying "wonderfully fragrant landscapes" (Aachener Zeitung) whilst "cleverly breaking down sound levels" (Utmisol). Amongst the most notable performances are those at the Klavierfestival Ruhr, with the Munich Philharmonic am Gasteig in Munich, la Roque-d'Anthéron and Bergamo & Brescia piano festivals, two tours of Japan with Valery Gergiev and Yuri Bashmet, the French debut with Orchestre national du Capitole de Toulouse, the opening gala of the Istanbul Festival, as well as the last-minute replacement for the indisposed Maurizio Pollini in Basel.

Dmitry Masleev is represented by Primavera Consulting LLC.
