= International Tchaikovsky Competition =

Quadrennial classical music competition in Moscow and Saint Petersburg, Russia

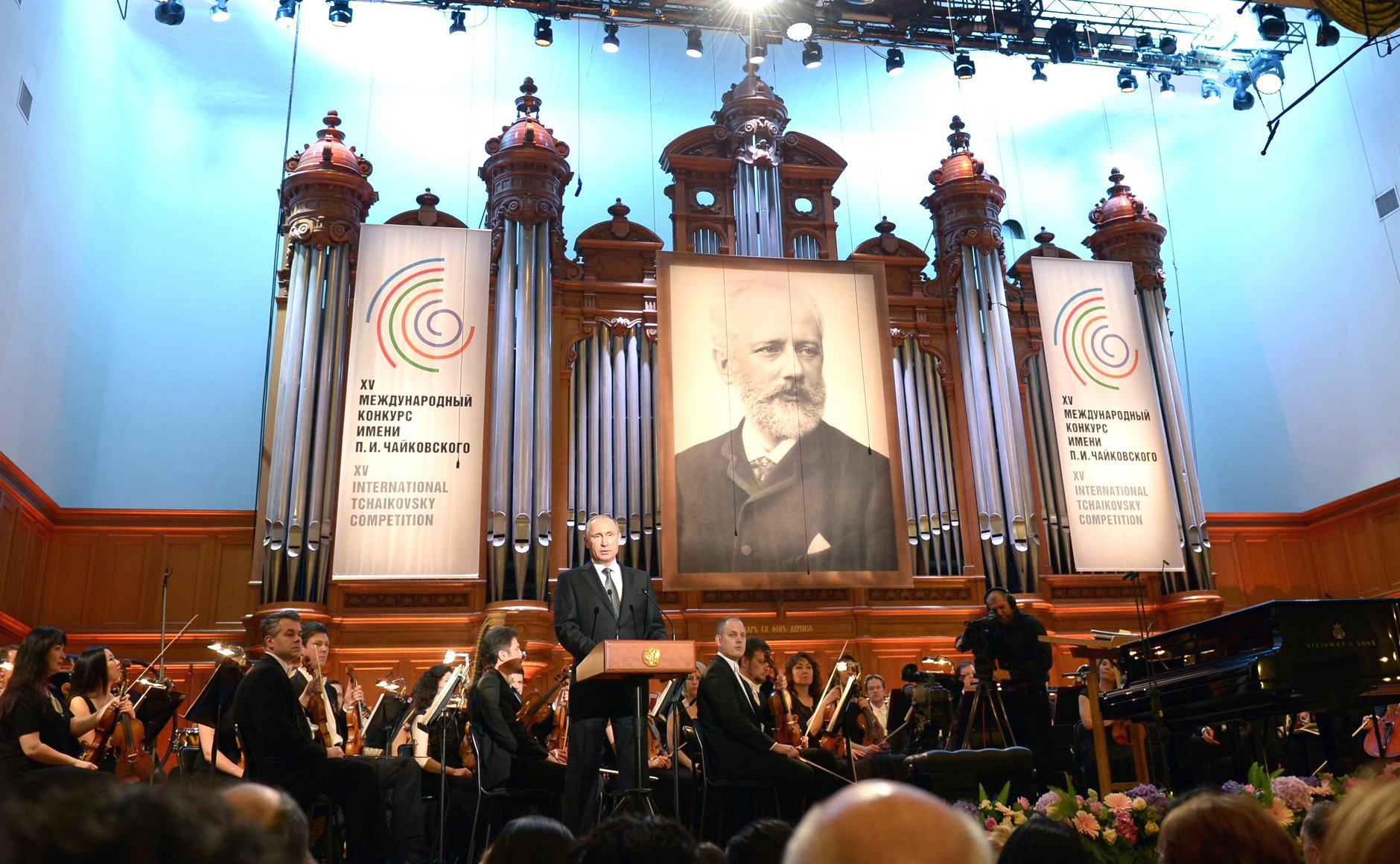
Vladimir Putin at the gala concert of winners of the XV International Competition

The International Tchaikovsky Competition is a classical music competition held every four years in Moscow and Saint Petersburg, Russia, for pianists, violinists, and cellists between 16 and 32 years of age, and singers between 19 and 32 years of age. The competition is named after Russian composer Pyotr Ilyich Tchaikovsky.

The International Tchaikovsky Competition was the first international music competition held in the Soviet Union, beginning in 1958. For the XIV competition in 2011, Valery Gergiev was appointed the competition's chairman, and Richard Rodzinski, former president of the Van Cliburn Foundation, was appointed general director. A new voting system was instituted, created by mathematician John MacBain, and used by the International Violin Competition of Indianapolis, the Van Cliburn International Piano Competition, and the Cleveland International Piano Competition. All rules and regulations also underwent a complete revision. Emphasis was placed on the composition of the jury, which consisted primarily of well-known and respected performing artists.

The XIV International Tchaikovsky Competition was held in Moscow and St. Petersburg, Russia, from 14 June to 1 July 2011, under the auspices of the Russian federal government and its Ministry of Culture. The competition disciplines were piano, violin, cello, and voice (male singers and female singers). The XV competition took place in June 2015. The XVI competition took place 17–29 June 2019, in Moscow and St. Petersburg; woodwind and brass competition disciplines were added. The XVII International Tchaikovsky Competition was held in Moscow in 2023. The XVIII International Tchaikovsky Competition will take place in 2027.

== Prizes ==
Cash prizes are awarded to the top-five competitors in each discipline of piano, violin, cello, and to each of the top four competitors in the men's and women's solo vocal categories. First prize (not always awarded) is US$30,000; second, US$20,000; third, US$10,000; fourth, US$5,000; and fifth, US$3,000. An additional prize, a Grand Prix of US$100,000, may be awarded to one of the gold medalists deemed outstanding by the juries. Additional awards are given for best performance of the chamber concertos and the commissioned new work.

For the 2019 competition, the prizes were as follows:

Prize	Amount
Grand Prix	US$100,000 in addition to the 1st Prize amount, for a total of US$130,000
1st Prize	US$30,000 and a Gold Medal
2nd Prize	US$20,000 and a Silver Medal
3rd Prize	US$10,000 and a Bronze Medal
4th Prize	US$5,000 and a Diploma
5th Prize	US$3,000 and a Diploma
6th Prize	US$2,000 and a Diploma
Best performance of a concerto with a chamber orchestra in Round II (in the piano, violin, and cello sections)	US$2,000 and a Diploma

== History ==
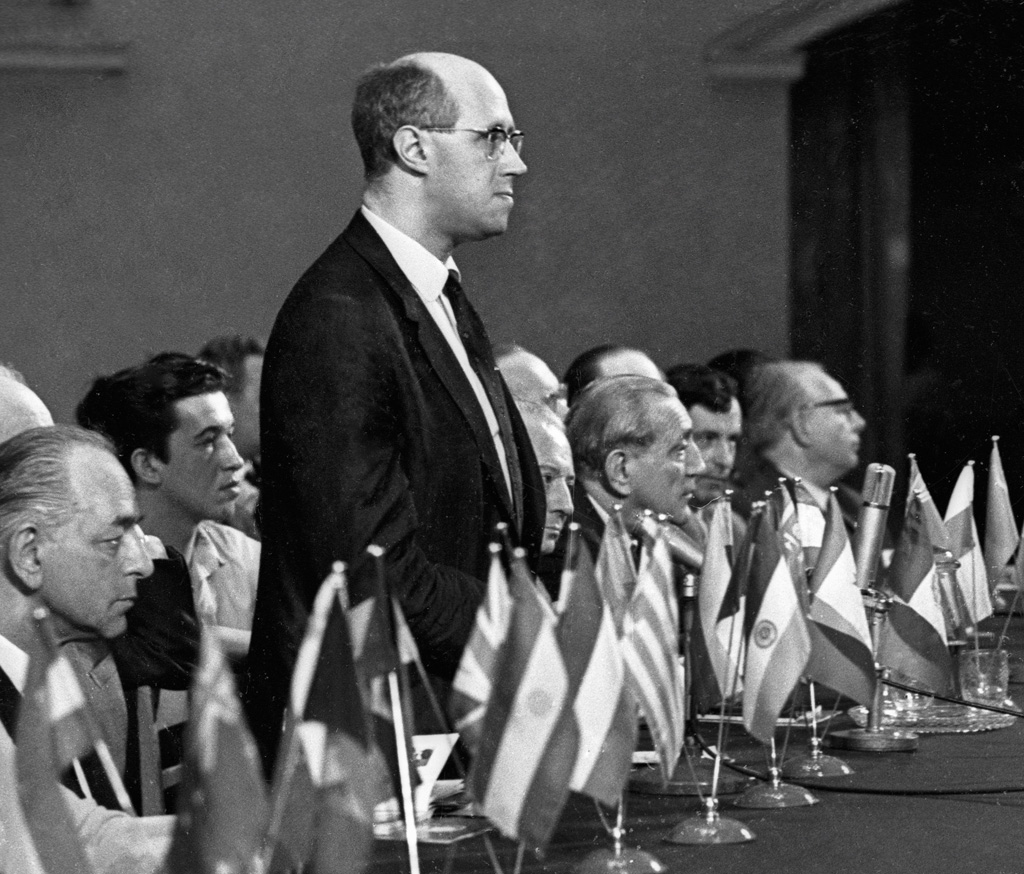
Mstislav Rostropovich on the jury, 1966

Held every four years, the first competition, in 1958, included two disciplines: piano and violin. Beginning with the second competition, in 1962, a cello category was added, and the vocal division was introduced during the third competition in 1966. In 1990, a fifth discipline was announced for the IX International Tchaikovsky Competition: a contest for violin makers, which traditionally comes before the main competition. In 2019, two new categories were added to the competition, woodwinds and brass.

=== Tianxu An incident ===
On 25 June 2019, at the final round of the piano category, Chinese competitor Tianxu An was supposed to play Tchaikovsky's Piano Concerto No. 1 followed by Rachmaninoff's Rhapsody on a Theme of Paganini. However, the scores on the orchestra's and conductor's stands were placed in reverse order and the Rachmaninoff piece was announced first, different from what the pianist requested. Since An didn't understand Russian, he was unaware of the situation. With the piano entry in the Rachmaninoff almost immediate, the performance "began with a failure". Following the incident, jury chair Denis Matsuev invited him to perform the program again, but An declined. The competition made an official apology and the orchestra administration suspended the responsible staff after the event. An was eventually awarded a "special prize" for his confidence and courage.

=== World Federation of International Music Competitions ===
In 1971, the International Tchaikovsky Competition joined the World Federation of International Music Competitions (WFIMC), which had been founded in 1957. On 19 April 2022, in line with widespread sanctions in response to the Russian invasion of Ukraine, the WFIMC decided with an overwhelming majority of member votes to exclude the International Tchaikovsky Competition from its membership with immediate effect.

== Prize winners ==
Winners of the prizes and medals awarded in the given year and category.

=== Piano ===
Year	Gold	Silver	Bronze
1958	Van Cliburn (USA)	Lev Vlassenko (USSR); Liu Shikun (China)	Naum Shtarkman (USSR)
1962	Vladimir Ashkenazy (USSR); John Ogdon (UK)	Susan Starr (USA); Yin Chengzong (China)	Eliso Virsaladze (USSR)
1966	Grigory Sokolov (USSR)	Misha Dichter (USA)	Victor Eresko (USSR)
1970	Vladimir Krainev (USSR); John Lill (UK)	Horacio Gutiérrez (Cuba)	Arthur Moreira Lima (Brazil); Viktoria Postnikova (USSR)
1974	Andrei Gavrilov (USSR)	Myung-whun Chung (South Korea); Stanislav Igolinsky (USSR)	Youri Egorov (USSR)
1978	Mikhail Pletnev (USSR)	Pascal Devoyon (France); André Laplante (Canada)	Nikolai Demidenko (USSR); Evgeny Rivkin (USSR)
1982	Not awarded	Peter Donohoe (UK); Vladimir Ovchinnikov (USSR)	Michie Koyama (Japan)
1986	Barry Douglas (UK)	Natalia Trull (USSR)	Irina Plotnikova (USSR)
1990	Boris Berezovsky (USSR)	Vladimir Mischouk (USSR)	Kevin Kenner (USA); Johan Schmidt (Belgium); Anton Mordasov (USSR)
1994	Not awarded	Nikolai Lugansky (Russia)	Vadim Rudenko (Russia); HaeSun Paik (South Korea)
1998	Denis Matsuev (Russia)	Vadim Rudenko (Russia)	Freddy Kempf (UK)
2002	Ayako Uehara (Japan)	Alexei Nabiulin (Russia)	Jin Ju (China); Andrey Ponochevny (Belarus)
2007	Not awarded	Miroslav Kultyshev (Russia)	Alexander Lubyantsev (Russia)
2011	Daniil Trifonov (Russia)	Yeol Eum Son (South Korea)	Seong-Jin Cho (South Korea)
2015	Dmitry Masleev (Russia)	Lukas Geniušas (Lithuania/Russia); George Li (USA)	Sergei Redkin (Russia); Daniel Kharitonov (Russia)
2019	Alexandre Kantorow (France)	Mao Fujita (Japan); Dmitry Shishkin (Russia)	Konstantin Emelyanov (Russia); Kenneth Broberg (USA); Alexey Melnikov (Russia)
2023	Sergei Davydchenko (Russia)	George Harliono (UK); Valentin Malinin (Russia); Angel Stanislav Wang (USA)	Stanislav Korchagin (Russia); Ilya Papoyan (Russia)

=== Violin ===
Year	Gold	Silver	Bronze
1958	Valery Klimov (USSR)	Victor Pikayzen (USSR)	Ștefan Ruha (Romania)
1962	Boris Gutnikov (USSR)	Shmuel Ashkenasi (Israel); Irina Bochkova (USSR)	Nina Beilina (USSR); Yoko Kubo (Japan)
1966	Viktor Tretiakov (USSR)	Masuko Ushioda (Japan); Oleg Kagan (USSR)	Yoko Sato (Japan); Oleh Krysa (USSR)
1970	Gidon Kremer (USSR)	Vladimir Spivakov (USSR); Mayumi Fujikawa (Japan)	Liana Isakadze (USSR)
1974	Not awarded	Eugene Fodor (USA); Ruben Aharonyan (USSR); Rusudan Gvasaliya (USSR)	Marie-Annick Nicolas (France); Vanya Milanova (Bulgaria)
1978	Ilya Grubert (USSR); Elmar Oliveira (USA)	Mihaela Martin (Romania); Dylana Jenson (USA)	Irina Medvedeva (USSR); Alexandr Vinnitsky (USSR)
1982	Viktoria Mullova (USSR); Sergei Stadler (USSR)	Tomoko Kato (Japan)	Stephanie Chase (USA); Andres Cardenes (USA)
1986	Ilya Kaler (USSR); Raphaël Oleg (France)	Xue Wei (China); Maxim Fedotov (USSR)	Jane Peters (Australia)
1990	Akiko Suwanai (Japan)	Evgeny Bushkov (USSR)	Alyssa Park (USA)
1994	Not awarded	Anastasia Chebotareva (Russia); Jennifer Koh (USA)	Graf Murzha (Russia); Marco Rizzi (Italy)
1998	Nikolai Sachenko (Russia)	Latica Honda-Rosenberg (Germany)	Ichun Pan (China)
2002	Not awarded	Tamaki Kawakubo (Japan/USA); Xi Chen (China)	Tatiana Samouil (Russia)
2007	Mayuko Kamio (Japan)	Nikita Boriso-Glebsky (Russia)	Yuki Manuela Janke (Germany)
2011	Not awarded	Sergey Dogadin (Russia); Itamar Zorman (Israel)	Jehye Lee (South Korea)
2015	Not awarded	Yu-Chien Tseng (Taiwan)	Alexandra Conunova (Moldova); Haik Kazazyan (Russia); Pavel Milyukov (Russia)
2019	Sergey Dogadin (Russia)	Marc Bouchkov (Belgium)	Donghyun Kim (South Korea)
2023	Gyehee Kim (South Korea)	Ravil Islyamov (Russia)	Daniil Kogan (Russia); Chaowen Luo (China); Elena Tarosyan (Russia)

=== Cello ===
Year	Gold	Silver	Bronze
1962	Natalia Shakhovskaya (USSR)	Leslie Parnas (USA); Valentin Feygin (USSR)	Natalia Gutman (USSR); Mikhail Khomitzer (USSR)
1966	Karine Georgian (USSR)	Stephen Kates (USA); Arto Noras (Finland)	Kenichiro Yasuda (Japan); Eleonora Testelets (USSR)
1970	David Geringas (USSR)	Victoria Yagling (USSR)	Ko Iwasaki (Japan)
1974	Boris Pergamenschikov (USSR)	Ivan Monighetti (USSR)	Hirofumi Kanno (Japan); Seta Baltayan (Bulgaria)
1978	Nathaniel Rosen (USA)	Mari Fudzivara (Japan); Daniel Veis (Czechoslovakia)	Alexander Kniazev (USSR); Alexander Rudin (USSR)
1982	Antonio Meneses (Brazil)	Alexander Rudin (USSR)	Georg Faust (West Germany)
1986	Mario Brunello (Italy); Kirill Rodin (USSR)	Suren Bagratuni (USSR); Martti Rousi (Finland)	Sara Sant'Ambrogio (USA); John Sharp (USA)
1990	Gustav Rivinius (West Germany)	Françoise Groben (Luxembourg); Alexander Kniazev (USSR)	Bion Tsang (USA); Tim Hugh (UK)
1994	Not awarded	Not awarded	Not awarded
1998	Denis Shapovalov (Russia)	Li-Wei Qin (Australia)	Boris Andrianov (Russia)
2002	Not awarded	Johannes Moser (Germany)	Claudius Popp (Germany); Alexander Chaushian (Armenia)
2007	Sergey Antonov (Russia)	Alexander Buzlov (Russia)	István Várdai (Hungary)
2011	Narek Hakhnazaryan (Armenia)	Edgar Moreau (France)	Ivan Karizna (Belarus)
2015	Andrei Ioniță (Romania)	Alexander Ramm (Russia)	Alexander Buzlov (Russia)
2019	Zlatomir Fung (USA)	Santiago Cañón Valencia (Colombia)	Anastasia Kobekina (Russia)
2023	Youngeun Lee (South Korea)	Maria Zaytseva (Russia)	Sanghyeok Park (South Korea)

=== Vocal, female ===
Year	Gold	Silver	Bronze
1966	Jane Marsh (USA)	Veronica Tyler (USA); Evelina Stoytseva (Bulgaria)	Not awarded
1970	Elena Obraztsova (USSR); Tamara Sinyavskaya (USSR)	Not awarded	Evdokia Kolesnik (USSR)
1974	Not awarded	Lyudmila Sergienko (USSR); Stefka Evstatieva (Bulgaria); Sylvia Sass (Hungary)	Galina Kalinina (USSR); Tatiana Erastova (USSR)
1978	Lyudmila Shemchuk (USSR)	Lyudmila Nam (USSR)	Ewa Podleś (Poland); Mariana Ciaromila (Romania)
1982	Lidiya Zabilyasta (USSR)	Khuraman Gasimova (USSR)	Dolora Zajick (USA)
1986	Natalia Erasova (USSR)	Barbara Kilduff (USA); Ana Felicia Filip (Romania)	Maria Guleghina (USSR)
1990	Deborah Voigt (USA)	Marina Shaguch (USSR)	Emilia Oprea (Romania); Maria Khokhlogorskaya (USSR)
1994	Hibla Gerzmava (Georgia); Marina Lapina (Russia)	Laura Claycomb (USA); Tatiana Zakharchu (Ukraine)	Irina Gelahova (Russia)
1998	Mieko Sato (Japan)	Elena Manistina (Russia)	Maira Mukhamed (Kazakhatan)
2002	Aitalina Afanasieva-Adamova (Russia)	Wu Bixia (China)	Anna Samuil (Russia)
2007	Albina Shagimuratova (Russia)	Olesya Petrova (Russia)	Marika Gulordava (Georgia)
2011	Sunyoung Seo (South Korea)	Not awarded	Elena Guseva (Russia)
2015	Yulia Matochkina (Russia)	Svetlana Moskalenko (Russia)	Mane Galoyan (Armenia)
2019	Maria Barakova (Russia)	Aigul Khismatullina (Russia)	Maria Motoligina (Russia)
2023	Zinaida Tsarenko (Russia)	Olga Maslova (Russia)	Albina Tonkikh (Belarus)

=== Vocal, male ===
Year	Gold	Silver	Bronze
1966	Vladimir Atlantov (USSR)	Nikolay Okhotnikov (USSR)	Simon Estes (USA); Konstantin Lisovsky (USSR)
1970	Yevgeny Nesterenko (USSR); Nikolai Ogrenich (USSR)	Vladislav Piavko (USSR); Zurab Sotkilava (USSR)	Victor Trishin (USSR)
1974	Ivan Ponomarenko (USSR)	Kolos Kováts (Hungary)	Anatoly Ponomarenko (USSR); Vladimir Malchenko (USSR)
1978	Not awarded	Valentin Pivovarov (USSR); Nikita Storojev (USSR)	Yuri Statnik (USSR)
1982	Paata Burchuladze (USSR)	Gegham Grigoryan (USSR)	Vladimir Chernov (USSR)
1986	Alexander Morozov (USSR); Grigory Gritsyuk (USSR)	Barseg Tumanyan (USSR)	Sergei Martynov (USSR)
1990	Hans Choi (USA)	Boris Statsenko (USSR)	Oleg Kulko (USSR); Wojciech Drabowicz (Poland)
1994	Chen-Ye Yuan (China)	Not awarded	Mikhail Davydov (Russia); Ho Gwan Su (North Korea)
1998	Besik Gabitashvili (Georgia)	Yevgeny Nikitin (Russia)	Alexander Kisselev (Russia)
2002	Mikhail Kazakov (Russia)	Andrej Dunaev (Russia)	Kim Don Seub (South Korea)
2007	Alexander Tsymbalyuk (Ukraine)	Dmitry Belosselskiy (Russia)	Maxim Paster (Ukraine)
2011	Jongmin Park (South Korea)	Enkhbatyn Amartüvshin (Mongolia)	Not awarded
2015	Ariunbaatar Ganbaatar (Mongolia)	Chuanyue Wang (China)	Hansung Yoo (South Korea)
2019	Georgios Alexandros Stavrakakis (Greece)	Gihoon Kim (South Korea)	Migran Agagzanyan (Russia)
2023	Jihoon Son (South Korea)	Maksim Lisiin (Russia); Zhenxiang Hong (China)	Inheo Jeong (South Korea)

=== Woodwinds ===
Year	Gold	Silver	Bronze
2019	Matvey Demin (flute; Russia)	Joidy Blanco (flute; Venezuela)	Alessandro Beverari (clarinet; Italy)
2023	Sofia Viland (flute; Russia)	Anna Komarova (flute; Russia); Fedor Osver (oboe; Russia)	Ye Sung Kim (flute; South Korea); Augusto Velio Palumbo (bassoon; Italy); Lev Zhuravskiy (clarinet; Russia)

=== Brass ===
Year	Gold	Silver	Bronze
2019	Zeng Yun (horn; China); Aleksey Lobikov (trombone; Russia)	Fedor Shagov (tuba; Russia)	Felix Dervaux (horn; France)
2023	Semyon Salomatnikov (trumpet; Russia)	Zhicheng Jin (horn; China)	Not awarded

=== Grand Prix ===
Year	Winner	Category
1994	Hibla Gerzmava	Vocal, female
2011	Daniil Trifonov	Piano
2015	Ariunbaatar Ganbaatar	Vocal, male
2019	Alexandre Kantorow	Piano
2023	Zinaida Tsarenko	Vocal, female

== See also ==
- International Tchaikovsky Competition for Young Musicians
- List of classical music competitions
- World Federation of International Music Competitions
- Critics' Prize (Tchaikovsky Competition)
