= Hideo Saito (musician) =

Japanese cellist, conductor, and music lecturer

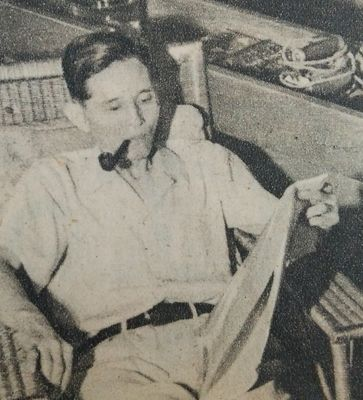
- Born: May 23, 1902; Tokyo, Japan
- Died: September 18, 1974 (aged 72); Tokyo, Japan
- Occupations: cellist, conductor

Hideo Saito (齋藤 秀雄, Saitō Hideo; May 23, 1902 – September 18, 1974) was a Japanese cellist, conductor, and music lecturer.

== Biography ==
Hideo Saito was born May 23, 1902, in Akashicho, Chūō, Tokyo, the second child of Hidesaburo Saito, an English-language researcher. Since 1906, Saito was raised in Ichibanchō (then Gobanchō), Chiyoda, Tokyo. When he was twelve, he became interested in music. The first instrument he played was the mandolin. (Note: In later time, he had an opportunity to conduct a mandolin orchestra named, "Orchestre Étoile" and composed tunes such as "Furansu Min'yō 'Utaeyo Kotori Yayo Utae' no Shudai ni yoru Yattsu no Hensōkyoku" (『フランス民謡「歌えよ小鳥やよ歌え」の主題による八つの変奏曲』) "Huit variations sur le thème d'une chanson populaire française 'Chante Chante petit oiseau!'" ("Eight variations on the theme of a popular French folk song: 'Sing, Sing, Little Bird!'"))

At the age of 16, Saito started playing the cello under the tutelage of a musician in Imperial Household Ministry. After attending the Gyosei Junior High School, Saito entered Sophia University. In 1922, however, he left university to study music in Germany. On his way there, he was accompanied by then-famous composer and conductor Viscount Hidemaro Konoye who was the younger brother of pre-war Japanese Prime Minister Fumimaro Konoe. After spending six months in Berlin, Saito moved to Leipzig to study cello with Professor Julius Klengel at the University of Music and Theatre Leipzig.

In 1927, Saito returned to Japan and was appointed principal cellist of the New Symphony Orchestra. He also appeared as a soloist. In 1930, he returned to Germany for more studies, this time studying with Emanuel Feuermann at the Musikhochschule in Berlin. After two years of intensive study, Saito returned to Japan and resumed his work as principal cellist of the New Symphony Orchestra.

In September 1936, Joseph Rosenstock was appointed permanent conductor of the New Symphony Orchestra. This appointment was to have quite an impact on Saito's musical life. He later confessed that he had learned many things from Rosenstock. During that period, he was an active solo and ensemble player and was on his way to establishing a conducting career. In 1941, he left the New Symphony Orchestra to devote himself entirely to conducting. He took a conducting position with several professional orchestras.

In 1948, with Motonari Iguchi, Takeo Ito, and Hidekazu Yoshida, all of whom were representative figures of Japanese musical circles, Hideo Saito founded the Music School for Children, starting with classrooms they rented from Tokyo Kasei Gakuin School (a girls' finishing school) in Kudan, Chiyoda, Tokyo.

They realized the necessity to provide the graduates with high school level of music studies. Kasei Gakuin, which had always been cooperative with Saito and his fellow teachers until then, became unable to be as generous in assigning more space for their proposed music high school. They had to find another existing school which would agree to add a music course for students aged 15 to 18. Their requests had been turned down one after the other until negotiations with Toho Girls' High School in Sengawa, Chōfu, Tokyo. The High School, however, had been established for girls, while what Saito was planning was a co-ed school. But the teachers and parents of the High School were strongly against the idea of admitting boys. Despite this negative atmosphere, the enthusiasm of Saito and the other musicians were gradually gaining supporters until a co-ed music course finally opened at Toho Girls' High School in 1952. And then the next year, the Music School for Children joined the Sengawa campus.

Three years had elapsed since the opening of the high school music course, and the same problem as they had faced three years before was happening again. The founders of the music course simply thought they would be able to pass their graduates to existing music colleges. The students and their parents, however, were not satisfied. And that is how, Toho Gakuen Junior College of Music (two-year college) started in 1955.

Saito became a professor of the College and chairman of its String and Conducting Departments. From 1958 to 1960, while President Motonari Iguchi was on a trip abroad, he was appointed Acting President of the College. In 1961, Toho Gakuen School of Music was established finally as a four-year college for further musical education.

Saito took the Toho Children's Orchestra on tour in 1964 to America and, in a later time, to the U.S.S.R. and to Europe. In 1974, despite his declining health, he had been preparing the orchestra for another major tour. It was just before its scheduled departure when Saito died.

== See also ==
- Julius Klengel
- Emanuel Feuermann
- Joseph Rosenstock
- Seiji Ozawa
- Tsuyoshi Tsutsumi
- Toho Gakuen School of Music
- Saito Kinen Orchestra
- Hirofumi Kanno
- Kazuyoshi Akiyama
