= Alexander Sladkovsky =

Russian conductor (born 1965)

- Александр Сладковский
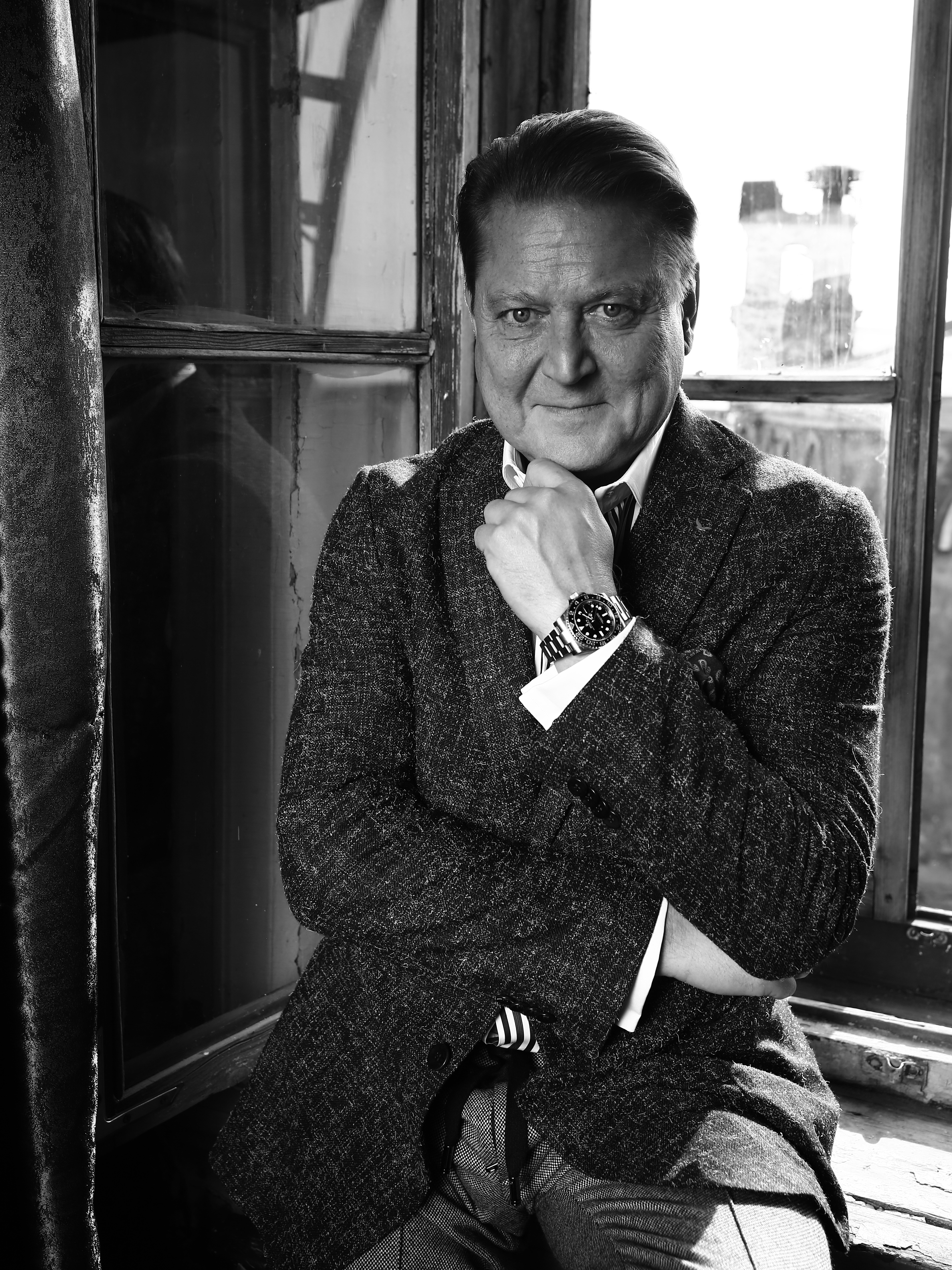
- Sladkovsky in 2022
- Born: Alexander Vitalyevich Sladkovsky; 20 October 1965 (age 60); Taganrog, Rostov Oblast, RSFSR, Soviet Union
- Education: Moscow Conservatory; Saint Petersburg Conservatory
- Occupation: Conductor
- Years active: 2000s–present
- Employer: Tatarstan National Symphony Orchestra
- Awards: People's Artist of Russia; People's Artist of Tatarstan; Duslyk Order
- Musical career
- Genre: Classical
- Labels: Sony Music; Sony Classical; RCA; Melodiya

Alexander Vitalyevich Sladkovsky (Russian: Александр Витальевич Сладковский; born 20 October 1965) is a Russian conductor. He is the chief conductor and artistic director of the Tatarstan National Symphony Orchestra. He was selected as People's Artist of Russia and People's Artist of Tatarstan, and won the third International Prokofiev Competition in 1999.

== Early life and education ==
Alexander Sladkovsky was born in 1965 in the Soviet city of Taganrog. He graduated from the Moscow Conservatory, with a gold medal, and the Saint Petersburg Conservatory.

== Career ==
In 2001, he conducted a concert at the Hermitage Theatre honoring the visit of Queen Beatrix of the Netherlands. He assisted Mariss Jansons and Mstislav Rostropovich.

Sladkovsky was the chief conductor of the State Opera and Ballet Theater of the Saint Petersburg Conservatory and went on to be chief conductor of the Saint Petersburg State Chapel, from 2004 to 2006, and the conductor of the New Russia State Symphony Orchestra from 2006 to 2010.

Since 2010, Sladkovsky has served as artistic director and principal conductor of the Tatarstan National Symphony Orchestra (TNSO) in the city of Kazan.

Organized by the TNSO and Sladkovsky, international music festivals such as Rakhlin Seasons, Miras, White Lilac, Kazan Autumn, Concordia, Denis Matsuev Meets Friends, the International Organ festival and Creative Discovery are considered some of the most prominent cultural events in Tatarstan and Russia. With the TNSO, Sladkovsky runs the project "Property of the Republic" for talented pupils from music schools and conservatory students; the educational project for Kazan schools pupils includes "Music lessons with an orchestra" as well as a "healing through music" project for seriously ill children. Sladkovsky is also the founder of the Youth Symphony Orchestra of Republic of Tatarstan.

The TNSO, under the direction of Sladkovsky, is the first Russian regional orchestra recorded by the Medici.tv and Mezzo television channels. In 2014, the TNSO conducted by Sladkovsky performed at the La Folle Journée festival in Japan. In 2016, for the first time in the orchestra's history, it gave concerts during a European tour in the Brucknerhaus (Linz) and in the Golden Hall of Musikverein (Vienna). In December 2018, the TNSO and Sladkovsky made the first tour in China, and in 2019, performed at the La Folle Journée festival in France and Japan as well as La Roque d'Antheron Festival. Sladkovsky and the TNSO had concert tours in Turkey (2015), Slovakia (2016), Switzerland (2016, 2017), Germany (2016), Spain (2017, 2020), Dubai (2022), Oman (2022), China (2018, 2023).

Sladkovsky conducting the Tatarstan National Symphony Orchestra, featuring Denis Matsuev; "White Lilac" music festival, Kazan, 2014

In 2016, in cooperation with the Melodiya record label, several global musical projects were realized: the recording of three Gustav Mahler symphonies (Nos. 1, 5, 9) and all the symphonies and concertos of Dmitri Shostakovich. In May 2020, the digital release of the Tchaikovsky-2020 box set took place – a recording of all symphonies and instrumental concerts of Tchaikovsky on the Sony Classical label. In August 2020, the TNSO under Sladkovsky recorded symphonic works by Sergei Rachmaninoff on the Sony Classical label. In March 2021, concert presentations of the box set Sergey Rachmaninoff Symphony Collection were held in Moscow, Saint Petersburg and Kazan. In July 2021, all of Ludwig van Beethoven's symphonies and the music of Igor Stravinsky's ballets were recorded. In March 2023, a Rachmaninioff album dedicated to the 150th anniversary of his birth was released on vinyl. The release of two more vinyl records of TNSO with Sladkovsky took place in 2024: Beethoven's Symphonies Nos. 3, 5 and 8.

In 2019, Sladkovsky was awarded the Sergei Rachmaninoff International Award for "Special Project in the Name of Sergei Rachmaninoff", having given special attention to his legacy and organizing the Sergei Rachmaninoff International Festival "White Lilac" in Kazan.

On 1 September 2021, by order of the rector of the N. Zhiganov Kazan State Conservatory artistic director and chief conductor of the TNSO, Sladkovsky was appointed professor of the Department of Opera and Symphony Conducting.

In 2022, Sladkovsky became the first recipient of the 440 Hertz Grand Orchestral Prize in the Conductor category.

The Tatarstan National Symphony Orchestra under the direction of Sladkovsky is the only regional orchestra to have its own annual subscription in the Moscow Philharmonic Society.

== Discography ==
Sladkovsky receiving the Dostyk Order from Tatarstan President Rustam Minnikhanov in 2015

- Anthology of Tatarstan Composers' Music (Sony, 2012)
- Просветление (Enlightenment) (RCA, 2013)
- Mahler: Symphonies Nos. 1, 5, 9 (Melodiya, 2016)
- Shostakovich: Complete Concertos (Melodiya, 2017)
- Shostakovich: Complete Symphonies (Melodiya, 2017)
- Tchaikovsky 2020 (2020)
- Sergey Rachmaninoff: Symphony Collection (2021)
- Stravinsky: Ballet Essentials (Sony Classical, 2022)
