= Denis Matsuev =

Denis Matsuev Денис Мацуев PAR
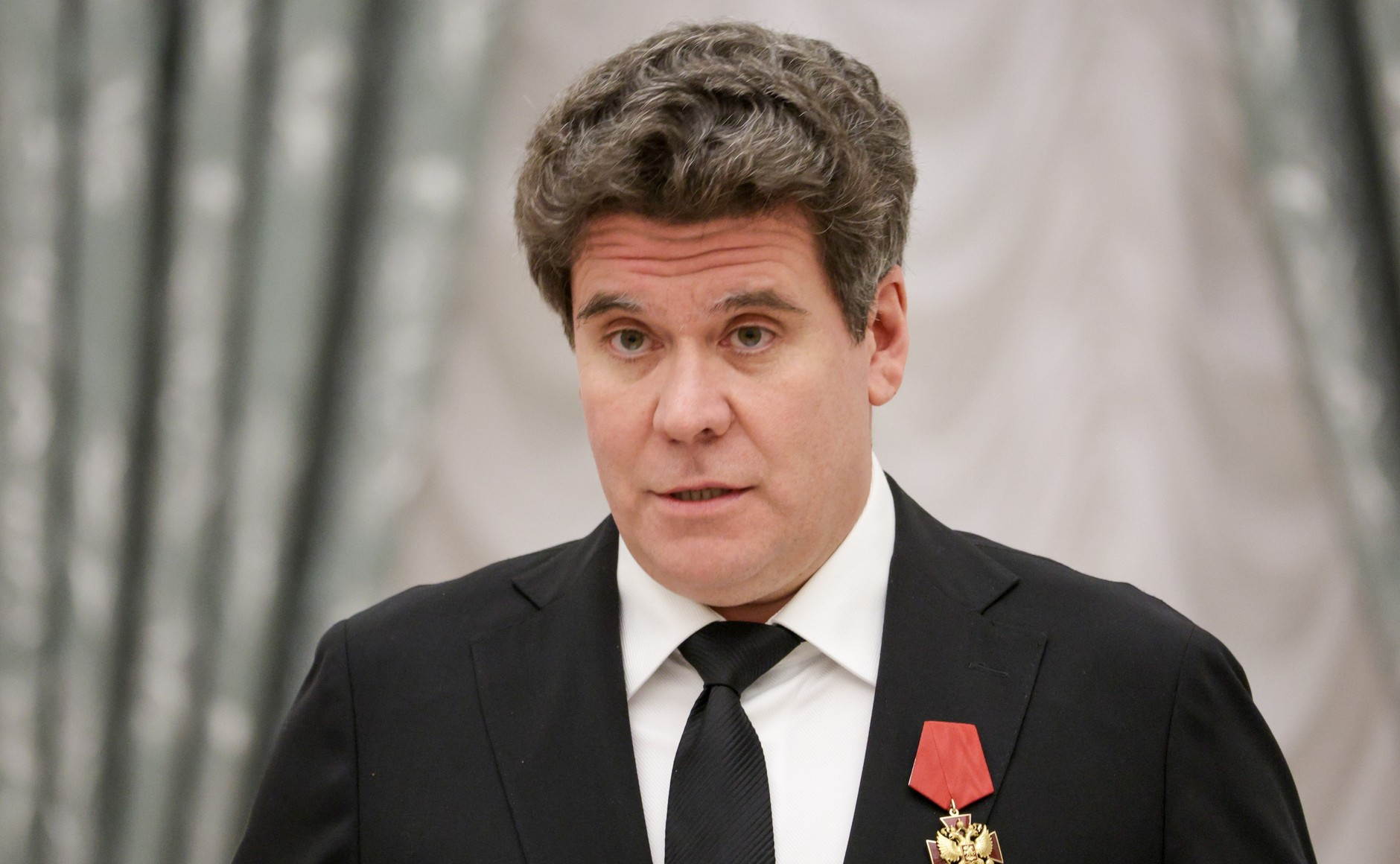
- Matsuev in 2025

Background information
- Born: 11 June 1975 (age 51); Irkutsk, Russian SFSR, Soviet Union
- Genres: Classical, jazz
- Occupation: Pianist
- Label: RCA Red Seal Records

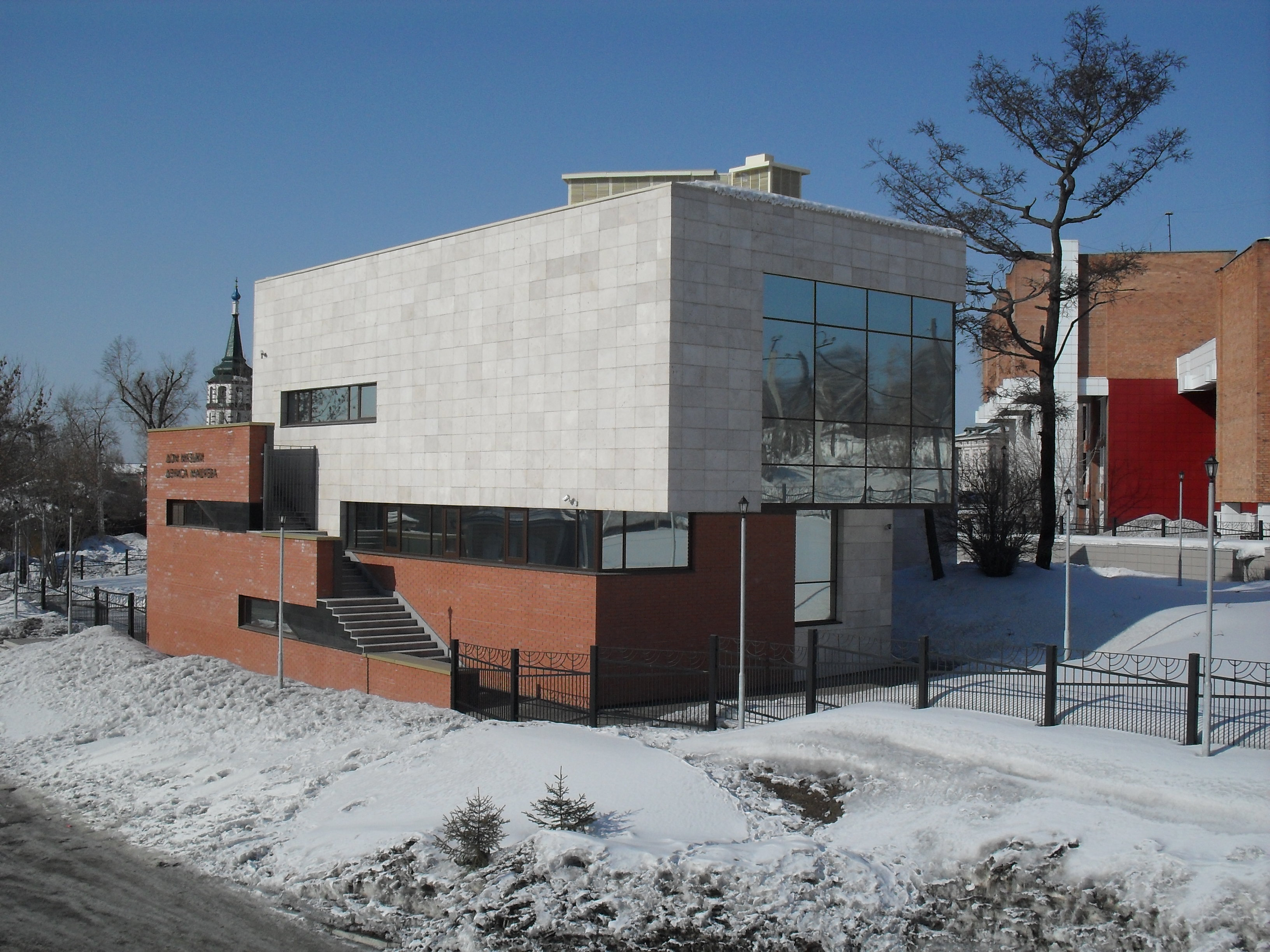
Concert hall in Irkutsk named after Matsuev, which serves as headquarters of the "Stars on Baikal" festival

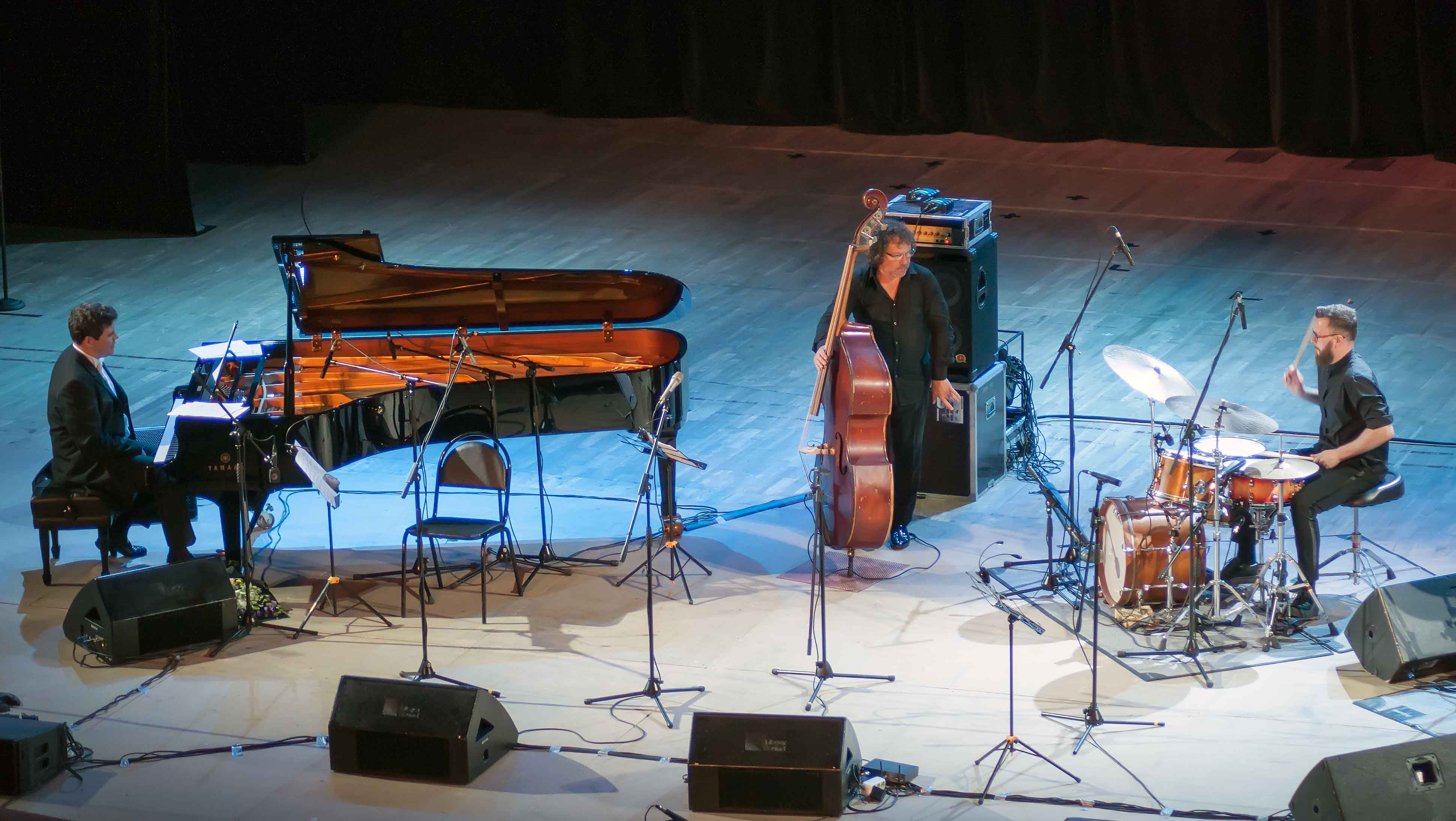
Jazz evening during the "Crescendo" festival, 2018

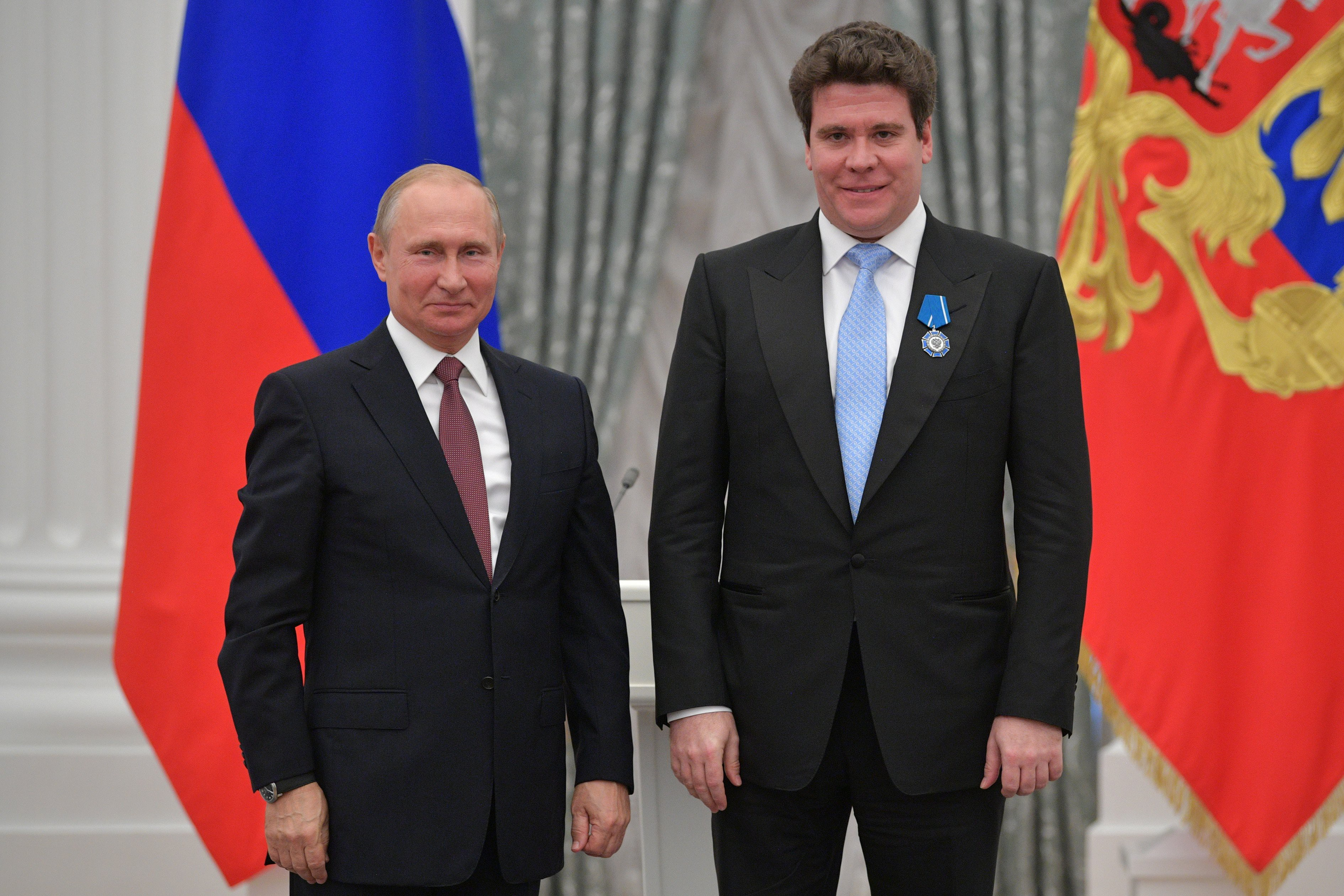
Matsuev being awarded the Order of Honour by President Vladimir Putin in 2018

Denis Leonidovich Matsuev (/ma'tsujef/; Russian: Дени́с Леони́дович Мацу́ев; born June 11, 1975) is a Russian pianist. Primarily a classical pianist, he also performs jazz occasionally.

== Biography ==
Born in Irkutsk, Soviet Union, Matsuev is the only child of two musicians, his mother being a piano teacher and his father a pianist and composer. He demonstrated a musical ear at age 3, when he reproduced on the piano at home a melody that he heard on television. His father subsequently became his first piano teacher. Until age 15, Matsuev studied music in Irkutsk. In 1990, he won a prize at the "New Names Charitable Foundation" competition in Irkutsk and received a stipend, $1,000 a month, from the foundation to study music in Moscow. With other young gifted musicians from Russia discovered by the foundation, Matsuev went on tour in Europe and the United States.

In 1991, Matsuev moved with his parents to Moscow to continue his musical education. He studied at the Central Music School at the Moscow Conservatory. In 1994, he took part at his first international piano competition in Johannesburg, South Africa, where he was awarded the Grand Prix. In the same year, he entered the Moscow Conservatory as a student of Aleksey Nasedkin. After 1997, he studied under Sergei Dorensky. Matsuev won the 11th International Tchaikovsky Competition in 1998 at age 23.

Matsuev is artistic co-director of the international "Annecy Classic Festival" in Annecy, France, with Pascal Escande. He is also the organizer and artistic director of two international festivals in Russia: "Stars on Baikal" in his native city of Irkutsk and the annual music festival "Crescendo".

In 2012 Matsuev became artistic director of the 1st International "Astana Piano Passion" Festival and Competition, and in 2013 he was artistic director of the International Festival and Competition "Sberbank DEBUT" in Kyiv.

In 2014, Matsuev and 80 other Russian artists signed a collective letter "to support the position of President Vladimir Putin on Ukraine and Crimea."

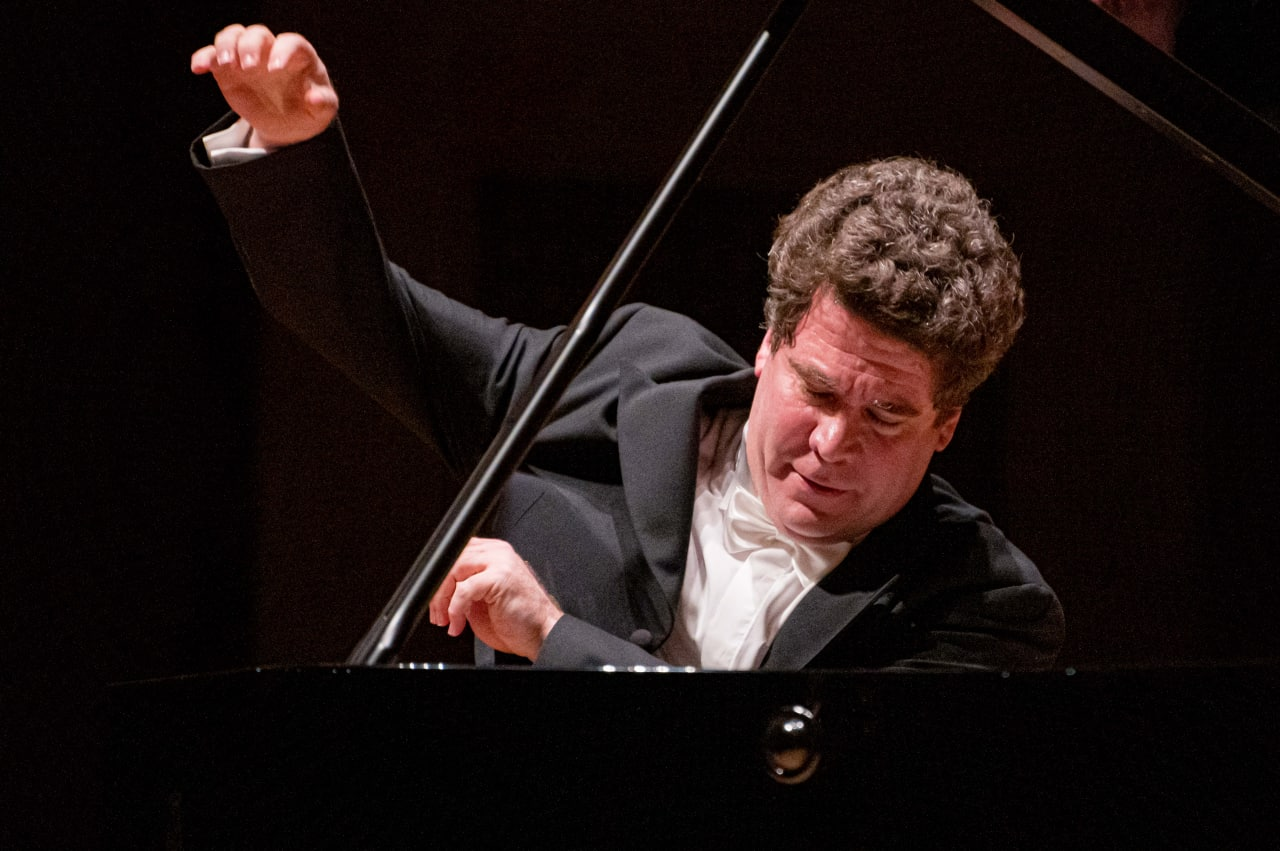
Denis Matsuev at the concert in Basel, Switzerland

In February 2014, at the XXII Olympic Winter Games in Sochi, Matsuev was a torchbearer, and performed in the closing ceremony.

In 2018 Matsuev was awarded the Russian Order of Honour. In 2022, due to his public support of Vladimir Putin, Matsuev's appearance with the Vienna Philharmonic in New York on February 25, 2022, was cancelled and he was replaced by pianist Seong-Jin Cho. Since the beginning of the Russian invasion of Ukraine in February 2022, Matsuev has not performed in the West.

== Awards, titles and honors ==
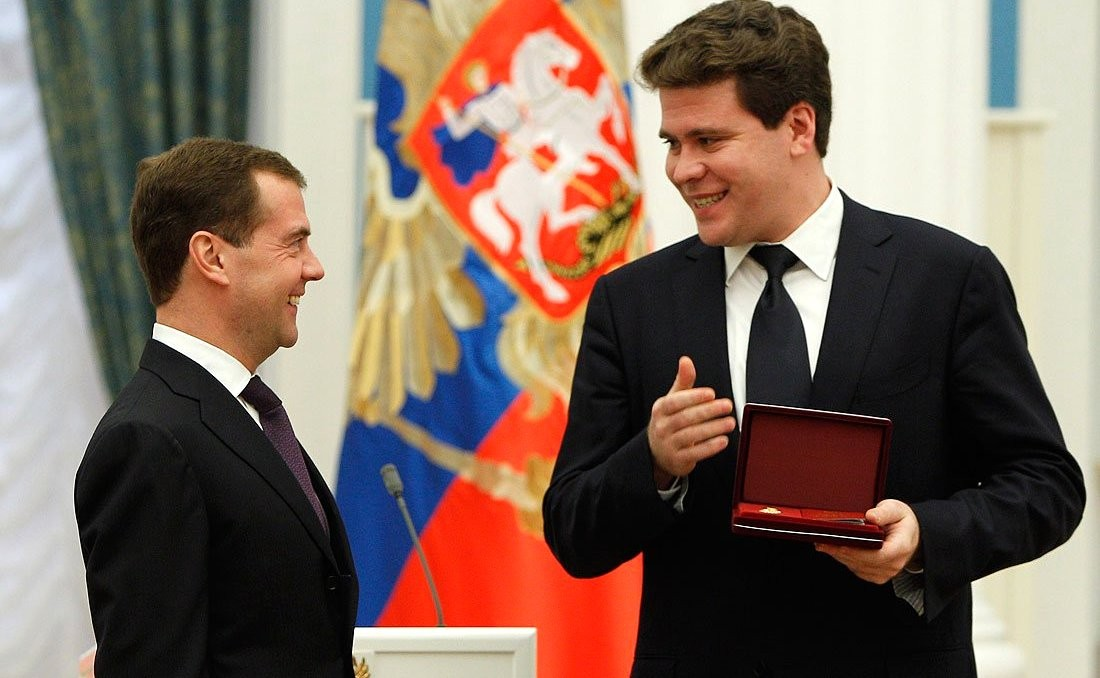
With Dmitry Medvedev on October 31, 2011

- UNESCO Goodwill Ambassador
- Order of Honour, 2018
- Russian National Music Award – Best Instrumentalist in Classical Music, 2016, 2017, 2018, 2019; Special Prize for Exceptional Performing Skills, 2015

== Discography ==
- Haydn, Liszt, Tchaikovsky, Prokofiev. © & ℗ 1997 New Names.
- Haydn, Chopin, Liszt, Rachmaninov, Prokofiev. © & ℗ Vivendi, 1999.
- Beethoven, Tchaikowsky, Liszt, Prokofiev. Collection Etoiles. Live recording – Eglise Notre-Dame d'Auvers-sur-Oise, 27 May 2000.
- Liszt: Mephisto Waltz S.514, Schumann: Symphonic Etudes Op. 13, Schubert: Piano Sonata No. 14 in A minor D.784. Sacrambow (Japan), © & ℗ 2000 JAPAN ARTS.
- Classic Masterpieces. Budapest Philharmonic Orchestra. Conductor Rico Saccani. Tchaikovsky – Piano Concertos Nos. 1 & 2. Soloist: Denis Matsouev. © & ℗ 2003 Independent Music & Media Alliance LTD.
- Tribute to Horowitz. Liszt, Bizet-Horowitz, Rossini-Ginzburg. ℗ & © 2004 BMG Russia.
- Stravinsky – Firebird Suite, Shchedrin – Piano Concerto No. 5. Mariss JAansons – Symphonieorchester des Bayerischen Rundfunks – © 2005 Sony BMG Music Entertainment
- Stravinsky & Tchaikovsky. I. Stravinsky – Three Movements From Petrouchka; P. I. Tchaikovsky – The Seasons. RCA Red Seal. ℗ & © 2005 Sony BMG Music Entertainment.
- Tchaikovsky: Piano Concerto No. 1 & Shostakovich: Concerto for Piano, Trumpet and Strings. St Petersburg PO/Temirkanov. RCA Red Seal ℗ & © 2007 Sony BMG Music Entertainment.
- Unknown Rachmaninoff, 18 March 2008, RCA Red Seal.
- The Carnegie Hall Concert – Denis Matsuev (20 October 2009) RCA Red Seal.
- Rachmaninov Piano Concerto No. 3, Rhapsody on a Theme of Paganini – Denis Matsuev, Gergiev, and Mariinsky Orchestra (9 February 2010).
- Franz Liszt. Russian National Orchestra and Michail Pletnev. Sony Music Entertainment (Russia), 2011.
- Franz Liszt – Piano concertos nos. 1 & 2 Totentanz; Orpheus; Héroïde funèbre. [New York]: Sony, 2011.
- Sjostakovitj, Dmitrij, Valerij Gergiev, and Rodion Stjedrin. Piano concertos nos. 1 & 2. State Academic Mariinsky Theatre, 2011.
- Rachmaninov Piano Concerto No. 2; Gershwin: Rhapsody In Blue. Sony BMG Music, 2013.
- Szymanowski: Symphonies Nos. 3 & 4, Stabat Mater. London Symphony Orchestra, Valery Gergiev (Conductor), Denis Matsuev (Artist), London Symphony Chorus (Orchestra) Format: Audio CD, 2013LSO Live Production
- Tchaikovsky: Piano Concertos Nos. 1 & 2. Denis Matsuev (Artist, Performer), Mariinsky Orchestra, Valery Gergiev (Conductor), Pyotr Ilyich Tchaikovsky (Composer), Format: Audio CD, 2014 Mariinsky Label
- Prokofiev: Piano Concerto No. 3, Symphony No. 5. Denis Matsuev (Performer), Mariinsky Orchestra, Valery Gergiev (Conductor), Sergei Prokofiev (Composer), Format: Audio CD, 2014 Mariinsky Label
- Rachmaninov Piano Concerto No. 1 (1917 Edition), Stravinsky Capriccio for Piano and Orchestra (1929), Shchedrin Piano Concerto No. 2 (1936). Denis Matsuev, Piano The Mariinsky Orchestra conducted by Valery Gergiev. Mariinsky Label 2015.
- Rachmaninov Piano Concerto No. 2, Prokofiev Piano Concerto No. 2. CD, Mariinsky Label January 2018.
