= International Tchaikovsky Competition for Young Musicians =

Classical music competition

The International Tchaikovsky Competition for Young Musicians is the junior section of the prestigious International Tchaikovsky Competition, and it is the largest competition for junior performers up to 17 years of age. The competition was established in 1992 on the initiative of the Association of Tchaikovsky Competition Stars and is held in the sections of piano, violin, and cello.

The first, second, and third prize winners receive special recommendation from the Association of Tchaikovsky Competition Stars to advance to the senior section without the preliminary procedure. Many laureates of the International Tchaikovsky Competition for Young Musicians eventually became winners of the senior Tchaikovsky competition and other prestigious international musical contests.

Harvey Lavan "Van" Cliburn Jr., the winner of the first International Tchaikovsky Competition, was the President and the Honorary Chairman of the first Tchaikovsky Competition for young musicians. The position of the Art Director of the International Tchaikovsky Competition for Young Musicians was held in different years by pianist Lev Vlasenko, violinist Viktor Tretyakov, cellist Vladislav Chernushenko and many other distinguished Russian and world's cultural figures.

The competition takes place in different countries each time, maximizing the opportunity to participate in the competition for talented young musicians of various geographic areas. It provides the opportunity to be exposed to sophisticated audiences, reputable musicians of the jury panel, and other young fellow musicians from around the world. On top of the monetary awards, the laureates are engaged in concert tours arranged by the organizing committee at the conclusion of the competition.

== Previous competitions and winners ==
=== 1. Moscow, Russia (1992) ===
June 14 – 30

The first International Tchaikovsky Competition for Young Musicians took place on the base of the Moscow Conservatory. Violin and cello auditions were held at the Small hall, and the piano auditions took place at the Grand hall of the Moscow Conservatory. The honorary chairmen were: Mikhail Pletnev (piano section), Natalia Shahovskaya (cello section), Eduard Grach and Viktor Tretyakov (violin section). The Tchaikovsky Symphony Orchestra of Moscow conducted by Alexander Vedernikov, was invited to accompany violinists and cellists. Pianists performed with the Russian National Orchestra, conducted by Nikolai Alekseev.

Prize	Piano		Violin		Cello	
Prize	Name	Country	Name	Country	Name	Country
I	Alexander Mogilevsky Emily Hsieh	Russia USA	Jennifer Koh	USA	Daniel Müller-Schott	Germany
II	Ekaterina Menshikova	Russia	Alexey Nagovitsyn Pan I Chun	Russia China	Tatiana Vasilieva	Russia
III	Alaxey Naibulin	Russia	Larisa Shahmatova	Russia	Alexander Chaushian Claudio Bohorquez	Armenia Germany
IV	Marianna Gumezkaya	Ukraine	Mark Komonko	Ukraine	Boris Adrianov	Russia
V	Victoria Korchinskaya-Kogan	Russia	Pavel Boev	Russia	—	—
VI	—	—	—	—	—	—

=== 2. Sendai, Japan (1995) ===
August 25 – September 10

Due to high artistic and organization level, the International Tchaikovsky Competition quickly established a worldwide reputation and soon after the first contest was over, the organizing committee received a suggestion to hold the second Tchaikovsky Youth Competition in Japan. Two orchestras participated in the contest: The Moscow Philharmonic Orchestra, conducted by Alexander Anisimov and The Sendai Philharmonic Orchestra. For the first time the piano section jury was chaired not by a Russian chairman, but by a Japanese pianist Hiroko Nakamura, Natalia Shahovskaya and Viktor Tretyakov chaired cello and violin jury once again.

Prize	Piano		Violin		Cello	
Prize	Name	Country	Name	Country	Name	Country
I	Lang Lang	China	Pyotr Kwasny	Poland	Monika Leskovar	Croatia
II	Ayako Uehara	Japan	Saeka Matsuyama	Japan	Bernard Naoki Hendeborg	Austria
III	Vassily Primakov	Russia	Wei Lu	China	Tao Ni Alexander Kekshoev	China Russia
IV	Igor Grishin	Russia	David Coucheron	Norway	Yu-Jeong Lee	South Korea
V	Polina Kondratkova	Russia	Amy Iwazumi	USA	Nikolay Gimaletdinov	Russia
VI	Ekaterina Menshikova	Russia	Liana Gourdjia	Russia	—	—

=== 3. Saint-Petersburg, Russia (1997) ===
August 23 – September 6

The third competition was held with the support of The Saint-Petersburg Conservatory. The opening and closing ceremonies and the third round took place at the Great Hall of the Saint Petersburg Conservatory and the auditions took place at the St. Petersburg State Academic Capella. All three sections were accompanied by the St Petersburg State Capella Symphony Orchestra, conducted by Vladislav Chernushenko. The jury was chaired by Maxim Fedotov (violin section), composer Sergei Slonimsky (piano section) and Anatoly Nikitin (cello section).

Prize	Piano		Violin		Cello	
Prize	Name	Country	Name	Country	Name	Country
I	Sergey Basukinsky	Russia	Bui Cong Duy	Vietnam	Bong Ihn Koh	South Korea
II	Yeoleum Son	South Korea	Hyuk Joo Kwun Maria Skriabina	South Korea Russia	Svetlana Vladimirova Nikolay Matveev	Russia Russia
III	Polina Kondratkova Piotr Ovcharov	Russia Russia	Ilya Kozlov	Russia	Alexey Kisilev	Belarus
IV	Dmitry Demyashkin	Russia	Jacek Ropski	Poland	Olga Demina	Russia
V	Pavel Dombrovsky	Russia	Vasiliy Filatov	Russia	—	—
VI	—	—	—	—	—	—

=== 4. Xiamen, China (2002) ===
October 18 – 31

Originally, the competition was planned to be held in 2000, but due to a bird flu outbreak the IV contest was postponed to 2002. The position of the Art Director was occupied by Yin Chengzong, the winner of the II International Tchaikovsky Competition, who came up with a proposal to hold the competition in his hometown of Xiamen. The jury was chaired by Aleksey Nasedkin (piano section), Natalia Shahovskaya (cello section) and Maxim Fedotov (violin section). The Xiamen Philharmonic Orchestra participated in the competition in cooperation with 30 Russian musicians, which were invited to join the orchestra during the contest. The orchestra was conducted by Zheng Xiaoying and Yury Kochnev. The first, the second and the third rounds were held at the Gulangyu Music Hall and Xiamen Art Theatre. The closing ceremony was held at the Xiamen People's Hall.

Prize	Piano		Violin		Cello	
Prize	Name	Country	Name	Country	Name	Country
I	Haochen Zhang	China	Xiao-yu Yang	China	Bonian Tian	China
II	Eun Taek Kim	South Korea	Ye-Eun Choi	South Korea	Seung-Min Kang	South Korea
III	Eugene Andreev	Russia	Elena Semenova	Russia	Jia Nan	China
IV	—	—	—	—	—	—
V	—	—	—	—	Yin Xiong	—
VI	—	—	—	—	Narek Hakhnazaryan	—

=== 5. Kurashiki, Japan (2004) ===
March 3 – 21

In 2004, the International Tchaikovsky Competition for Young Musicians returned to Japan. The opening ceremony, the first and the second Piano rounds were held at the Toko-Gakuda Hall. The first and the second violin rounds were held at the Syoutikuden Hall and cello rounds took place at the Kurashiki City Auditorium. The Tchaikovsky House-Museum in Kiln, Russia, participated in the competition for the first time and brought the exhibition of Tchaikovsky’s personal belongings. The participants performed with the State Academic Symphony Orchestra of Russia “Evgeny Svetlanov”, conducted by Yuri Tkachenko and Hiroshi Sekiya. The jury was chaired by the Russian Minister of Culture Alexander Sokolov (piano section), Maxim Fedotov (violin section) and Sergei Roldugin (cello section).

Prize	Piano		Violin		Cello	
Prize	Name	Country	Name	Country	Name	Country
I	Yulia Chaplina	Russia	Aylen Pritchin	Russia	Fedor Amosov	Russia
II	Dinara Klinton	Ukraine	Wonhyee Bae	South Korea	Eun-Sun Hong	South Korea
III	Yoshito Numasawa Kuok-Wai Lio	Japan China	Yoon Won Song	South Korea	Un Lee Alexey Zhilin	South Korea Russia
IV	—	—	—	—	—	—
V	—	—	—	—	Eunkwang Cha	South Korea
VI	—	—	—	—	—	—

=== 6. Suwon, Korea (2009) ===
June 6 – 28

The VI International Tchaikovsky Competition for Young Musicians took place in Suwon, Korea in 2009. The opening ceremony, the piano first and the second rounds, the closing ceremony and the final gala-concert were held at the Gyeonggi Arts Center Grand Hall. The cello first and second rounds were held at the Gyeonggi Arts Center Small Hall, and the violin first and second rounds were held at the Gyeonggi Arts Center Dasan Hall. There were three conductors Nance Gum, Yury Tkachenko and Alexander Polyshuk invited to perform with the Russian Symphony Orchestra and the Gyeonggi Philharmonic Orchestra. The jury was headed by Alexander Sokolov (piano section), Sergei Kravchenko (violin section) and Sergei Roldugin (cello section).

Prize	Piano		Violin		Cello	
Prize	Name	Country	Name	Country	Name	Country
I	Nansong Huang	China	Sirena Huang	USA	Michiaki Ueno	Japan
II	Su Yeon Kim Yu Chong Wu	South Korea China	Seohyun Lim	South Korea	Sang Eun Lee	South Korea
III	Jung Eun Kim	South Korea	Jou Rose Hsien Gye Hee Kim	Taiwan South Korea	Taeguk Mun Sae Bom Byun	South Korea South Korea
IV	Dmitry Mayboroda	Russia	Inmo Yang	South Korea	Si Hao He Young-In Na	China South Korea
V	Zuhao Liu	China	Ke Zhu	China	—	—
VI	—	—	—	—	—	—

=== 7. Montreux/Vevey, Switzerland (2012) ===
September 4 – 15

In 2012 The International Tchaikovsky Competition for Young Musicians for the first time held in Europe, on the shores of lake Geneva. The Saint Petersburg Philharmonic Orchestra, conducted by Yury Temirkanov performed at the opening night. Third round participants performed at the Auditorium Stravinsky with the State Symphony Orchestra ”Novaya Rossiya”, conducted by Yury Tkachenko and with the Sinfonietta de Lausanne, conducted by Martin Fisher-Dieskau. The Swiss organizing Committee was led by Mr. Tobias Richter, Art Director of the Septembre Musical and the CEO of the Grand Théâtre de Genève. The jury was chaired by Viktor Tretyakov (violin), Alexander Sokolov (piano) and Krill Rodin (cello).

Prize	Piano		Violin		Cello	
Prize	Name	Country	Name	Country	Name	Country
I	Alexander Kutuzov	Russia	Veriko Tchumburidze	Georgia Turkey	Noah Lee	USA
II	Bolai Cao	China	Yoo-Jin Lee	South Korea	Zlatomir Fung	USA
III	Kon Ui Park	North Korea	Jaewon Wee Yury Vasilevsky	South Korea Belarus	Ja Kyung Huh	South Korea
IV	Xuehong Chen	China	Herongjia Han	China	Dongyeol Lee	South Korea
V	Ilya Bakhtin	Russia	Seunghee Lee	South Korea	Ivan Sendetskiy	Russia
VI	Taek Gi Lee	South Korea	—	—	Young In Na	South Korea

=== 8. Moscow, Russia (2014) ===
June 23 – July 3

After a 20-year break, the competition returned to Moscow. The third round participants performed at the Grand Hall of the Moscow Conservatory with the State Symphony Orchestra ”Novaya Rossiya”, conducted by the Honored Artist of Russia Yury Tkachenko and Eurasian Symphony Orchestra (Kazakhstan), conducted by Aidar Torybaev. The jury was chaired by Vladimir Ovchinnikov (piano section), Aiman Mussakhajayeva (violin section) and Eleonora Testeleca (cello section). The organizing committee of the competition in Moscow consisted of the Moscow Conservatory, Russian State Academy of music and the Central Music School of the Moscow Conservatory.

Prize	Piano		Violin		Cello	
Prize	Name	Country	Name	Country	Name	Country
I	Alexander Malofeev	Russia	Ruslan Turuntaev	Kazakhstan	La Li	China
II	Kaiwen Zhao	China	Roman Reshetkin Soo Been Lee	Russia France South Korea	Woochan Jeong Gabriel Martins	South Korea USA
III	Tagir Kamaltdinov	Russia	Naina Kobzareva Yoo Min Seo	Russia South Korea	Nathan Le	USA
IV	Vladimir Skomorokhov	Russia	Wei Zhang	China	Hyunah Pyo	South Korea
V	Ildar Saubanov	Russia	—	—	Natalia Smirnova	Russia
VI	Yanfeng Bai	China	—	—	—	—

=== 9. Novosibirsk, Russia (2015) ===
December 5 – 15

The IX International Tchaikovsky Competition for Young Musicians was dedicated to the 175th birthday anniversary of the great Russian composer Pyotr Tchaikovsky, was held for the first time during winter time and in the capital of Siberia. The third round participants performed in the Arnold Katz State Concert Hall with the Belarusian State Academic Symphony Orchestra, conducted by the Honored Figure of Art of the Russian Federation, People's Artist of the Republic of Belarus Alexander Anissimov and the Novosibirsk Philharmonic Orchestra, conducted by the Honored Artist of Russia Yury Tkachenko. The jury was chaired by Vladimir Ovchinnikov (piano section), Sergei Kravchenko (violin section) and Maria Tchaikovskaya (cello section). The competition was organized by the Ministry of Culture of the Novosibirsk region, the Association of the Tchaikovsky Competition Stars and the Interstate Corporation for Development.

Prize	Piano		Violin		Cello	
Prize	Name	Country	Name	Country	Name	Country
I	Su-Ah Ye	South Korea	Maria Andreeva Donghyun Kim	Russia South Korea	Maria Zaytseva Anastasia Ushakova	Russia Russia
II	Elizaveta Kliuchereva	Russia	Lisa Yasuda Diana Adamyan Jieon Park	Japan Armenia South Korea	Dylan Wu Sanga Yang	USA South Korea
III	Hyuk Lee	South Korea	Hyeonah Hong Maria Baeva-Kuznetsova	South Korea Russia	Dan Ah Han Timur Rashkov	South Korea Belarus
IV	Yongqiu Liu	China	—	—	Jung Ah Lee	South Korea
V	Shuan Hern Lee	Australia	—	—	—	—
VI	Alexander Zakharov	Russia	—	—	—	—

=== 10. Astana, Kazakhstan (2017) ===
June 15 – 25

The anniversary competition took place in the capital of Kazakhstan. Auditions were held in "Astana Opera" and in the halls of Kazakh National University of Arts. The closing ceremony was in Kazakhstan Central Concert Hall. The finalists were accompanied by the Eurasian Symphony Orchestra (conductor – Honored Artist of Russia Yuri Tkachenko) and the Symphony Orchestra of KazNUA (conductor – Aidar Torybaev). The chairmen of the jury were: Vladimir Ovchinnikov (piano section), Viktor Tretyakov (violin section), Sergey Roldugin (cello section). The contest was organized by the Association of Tchaikovsky Competition Stars and the Ministry of Culture and Sport of the Republic of Kazakhstan. The contest was conducted with the support of the Kazakh National University of Arts, the Moscow State Tchaikovsky Conservatory and Akimat of Astana.

Prize	Piano		Violin		Cello	
Prize	Name	Country	Name	Country	Name	Country
I	Kyle Hu Maria Andreeva	USARussia	Nakyung Kang Eugene Kawai	South Korea Japan	Yo Kitamura	Japan
II	Ilia Papoian Hechao Yang	Russia China	Anne Maria Wehrmeyer Akbike Algi	Germany Kazakhstan	Namisa Sun	China
III	Anastasia Makhamendrikova	Russia	Rakhil Mussakhojayeva Aleksei Stychkin Zhenyi Jiang	Kazakhstan Russia China	Yeeun Kang	South Korea
IV	Song Hyeon Kim Hiroki Nakayama	South Korea Japan	—	—	Sean Kanghyun Yu	USA
V	—	—	—	—	Sara Čano	Slovenia
VI	—	—	—	—	Mauro Paolo Monopoli	Italy

=== 11. St. Petersburg/Moscow, Russia (2023) ===
January 9 – 14

Originally scheduled to be held in Chengdu, China, the 30th anniversary edition was forced relocate back to Russia due to various issues with the Chinese foundation organizing the competition. Amidst the backdrop of the COVID-19 pandemic and the Russian invasion of Ukraine, the first two rounds were held online, but the final round was held in the Grand Hall of the St. Petersburg Philharmonia and in the halls of Moscow Conservatory, the latter of which also hosted the closing ceremony. The finalists were accompanied by the Moscow State Symphony Orchestra (conductor – Honored Artist of Russia Yuri Tkachenko) and the State Symphony Orchestra of Leningrad Oblast (conductor – Mikhail Golikov). The chairmen of the jury were: Yuri Slesarev (piano section), Viktor Tretyakov (violin section), and Sergey Roldugin (cello section). The event was organized by the Association of Tchaikovsky Competition Stars and the Ministry of Culture of the Russian Federation and conducted with the support of the St. Petersburg Rimsky-Korsakov Conservatory, the Moscow State Tchaikovsky Conservatory and Gnessin Russian Academy of Music.

Prize	Piano		Violin		Cello	
Prize	Name	Country	Name	Country	Name	Country
I	Yutian Yang	China	Jinzhu Li Zhiyuan Qian	China China	Jung-A Kim	South Korea
II	Haolun Sun Chenzhe Ni	China China	Stefaniia Pospekhina Aleksandr Papushev Yaozhang Wang	Russia Russia China	Tae-Yeon Kim Polina Tkhai	South Korea Russia
III	Aksinia Potemkinia Artur Iskorotenskiy	Russia Russia	Daniil Bessonov Sergey Mkrtichayn	Russia Russia	Sofya Khuskivadze-Deeva Nicholas Wong Chengyue Wen	Russia USA China
IV	Songawn Kwon	South Korea	Hanyue Zhang	China	Shang Zhou Xia	China
V	Gleb Semenov Inna Zabruskova	Russia Russia	Sooeon Kim	South Korea	Tatiana Borisova	Russia
VI	—	—	Yinuo Fang	China	—	—

== Competition partners ==
For years the International Tchaikovsky Competition for Young Musicians partnerships included major educational institutions, concert venues and commercial companies. The Moscow Conservatory, Russian State Academy of Music and the Central Music School of the Moscow Conservatory stand out among the common educational partners of the competition. In 2015, the special prize for the winners, porcelain statuette ”Muse” – a symbol of Tchaikovsky's patroness Nadezhda von Meck – has been designed by collective authorship of artists of Sergei Andriaka's Watercolor and Fine Arts Academy, partner for the IX International Tchaikovsky Competition for Young Musicians.

== See also ==
- List of classical music competitions
