= Piano Concerto (Scriabin) =

Work by Russian composer Alexander Scriabin

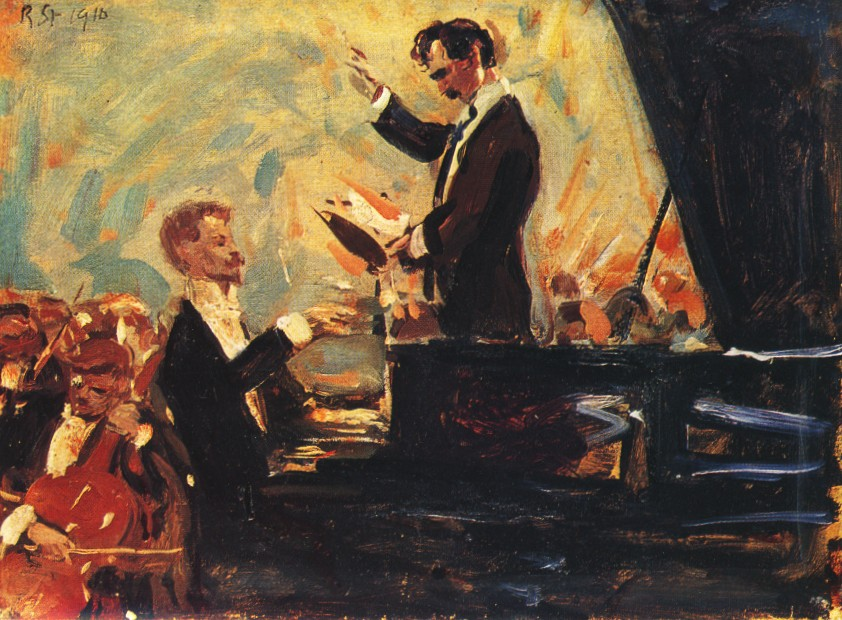
Klavierkonzert mit Alexander Skrjabin unter Leitung von Sergei Kussewitzky by Robert Sterl (1910), Galerie Neue Meister, Dresden.

The Piano Concerto in F♯ minor, Op. 20, is an early work of the Russian composer Alexander Scriabin (1872–1915).

Written in 1896, when he was 24, it was his first work for orchestra and the only concerto he composed. Scriabin completed the concerto in only a few days in the fall of 1896, but did not finish the orchestration until the following May (and only after constant urging by his publisher and patron Mitrofan Belyayev). Belyayev paid the composer 600 rubles (roughly $10,000 in current USD); it premiered in October 1897 and was finally published in 1898.

== Music ==
The concerto is scored for 2 flutes and piccolo, 2 oboes, 2 clarinets, 2 bassoons, 4 horns, 2 trumpets, 3 trombones, timpani, strings, and solo piano.

The work consists of three movements, typically lasting about 28 minutes in total:

1. Allegro
2. Andante
3. Allegro moderato

=== I. Allegro ===
The main theme is introduced by the piano and then transferred to the orchestra while the piano accompanies in octaves.

=== II. Andante ===
The second movement begins in the key of F♯ major which was for Scriabin "a ‘bright blue’ mystic key". It is in the form of theme and variations. The orchestra introduces the theme. The piano enters with the first variation, accompanying the orchestra's theme with arpeggios. The second variation is faster, marked allegro scherzando. The third variation is a slow funeral march. The fourth variation is marked allegretto and features intricate ornamentation; the clarinet introduces the melody, and interweaves counterpoint with the soloist. The movement ends with return of the theme to the orchestra, almost identical to the first variation.

=== III. Allegro moderato ===
This movement also develops material from the first movement. The first theme is condensed into the first two bars followed by a virtuosic arpeggio. A second, more lyrical theme then comes in A major before returning to the original F♯ minor theme, which is soon developed vigorously. After a climax occurs where the first theme is presented yet again, the second theme comes back, this time in F♯ major. After some short final thoughts, where there's a modulation to A minor, the key returns to F♯ major for a brief, but triumphant and emphatic coda, ending in three loud F♯ major chords.

== Recordings ==
Pianist	Orchestra	Conductor	Record Company	Year of Recording	Format
Heinrich Neuhaus	All-Union Radio Orchestra	Nikolai Golovanov	Russian Disc	1946	CD
Solomon	Philharmonia Orchestra	Issay Dobrowen	EMI	1949	CD
Samuil Feinberg	USSR State TV and Radio Symphony Orchestra	Alexander Gauk	Brilliant Classics	1950	CD
Paul Badura-Skoda	Wiener Symphoniker	Henry Swoboda	Deutsche Grammophon	1951	CD
Friedrich Wührer	Pro Musica Orchester Wien	Hans Swarowsky	Vox Records	1954	Vinyl
Dmitri Bashkirov	USSR State Radio Orchestra	Kiril Kondrashin	Artia Recording Corporation	1960	CD
Stanislav Neuhaus	USSR Symphony Orchestra	Victor Dubrovsky	Melodiya	1965	Vinyl
Gennady Cherkasov	Moscow Symphony Orchestra	Alexei Cherkasov	Melodiya		Vinyl
Michael Ponti	Hamburg Symphony Orchestra	Hans Drewanz	Turnabout	1970	CD
Vladimir Ashkenazy	London Philharmonic Orchestra	Lorin Maazel	Decca	1971	CD
Igor Zhukov	Estonian State Symphony Orchestra	Neeme Järvi	Melodiya	1978	Vinyl
Garrick Ohlsson	Czech Philharmonic Orchestra	Libor Pešek	Supraphon	1987	CD
Abbott Ruskin	MIT Symphony Orchestra	David Epstein	Pantheon	1987	CD
Roland Pöntinen	Stockholm Philharmonic Orchestra	Leif Segerstam	BIS Records	1989	CD
Aleksey Nasedkin	USSR State Symphony Orchestra	Evgeny Svetlanov	Melodiya	1990	CD
Alexei Golovin	Moscow Symphony Orchestra	Vladimir Ponkin	Le Chant du Monde	1990	CD
Nikolai Demidenko	BBC Symphony Orchestra	Alexander Lazarev	Hyperion Records	1993	CD
Gerhard Oppitz	Frankfurt Radio Symphony Orchestra	Dmitri Kitaenko	RCA	1993	CD
Evelyne Dubourg	Sofia Philharmonic Orchestra	Nicholas Uljanov	Tudor Records	1993	CD
Karl-Andreas Kolly	Symphony Orchestra Basel	Armin Jordan	Pan Classics	1995	CD
Elena Kuznetsova	Russian State Symphony Orchestra	Ivan Shpiller	Triton	1995	CD
Claire Désert	Orchestre philharmonique de Strasbourg	Theodor Guschlbauer	Aria Music	1995	CD
Mee-Hyun Ahn	The Moscow Orchestra	Mikael Avetisyan	Classical Assembly	1996	CD
Evgeni Mikhailov	State Symphony Orchestra	Vladimir Ponkin	Vista Vera	1996	CD
Michael Ponti	Philharmonisches Orchester des Vogtland Theaters Plauen	Paul Theissen	Dante	1996	CD
Konstantin Scherbakov	Moscow Symphony Orchestra	Igor Golovchin	Naxos Records	1996	CD
Arkady Sevidov	Russian Philharmonic Orchestra	Konstantin Krimets	Arte Nova	1996	CD
Peter Jablonski	Deutsches Symphonie-Orchester Berlin	Vladimir Ashkenazy	Decca	1996	CD
Anatol Ugorski	Chicago Symphony Orchestra	Pierre Boulez	Deutsche Grammophon	1996	CD
Viktoria Postnikova	Residentie Orchestra (The Hague)	Gennady Rozhdestvensky	Chandos	1998	CD
Artur Pizarro	North German Radio Philharmonic Orchestra	Martyn Brabbins	Collins Classics	1998	CD
Roger Woodward	Sydney Symphony Orchestra	Edo de Waart	ABC Classics	1999	CD
Claudio Crismani	London Philharmonic Orchestra	Thomas Sanderling	Real Sound	2001	CD
Aleksey Nasedkin	Tchaikovsky Symphony Orchestra	Vladimir Fedoseyev	Vista Vera	2005	CD
Andrei Korobeinikov	Academic Symphony Orchestra of St. Petersburg Philharmony	Mikhail Snitko	Olympia Records	2006	CD
Nikita Fitenko	Russian Philharmonic Orchestra	Marlan Carlson	Classical Records	2007	CD
Pavlina Dokovska	Bulgarian National Radio Orchestra	Vladimir Ghiaurov	Gega New	2007	CD
Oleg Marshev	South Jutland Symphony Orchestra	Vladimir Ziva	Danacord	2008	CD
Yevgeny Sudbin	Bergen Philharmonic Orchestra	Andrew Litton	BIS Records	2013	SACD
Kirill Gerstein	Oslo Philharmonic Orchestra	Vasily Petrenko	Lawo Classics	2017	CD
Xiayin Wang	Royal Scottish National Orchestra	Peter Oundjian	Chandos	2018	SACD
Daniil Trifonov	Mariinsky Orchestra	Valery Gergiev	Deutsche Grammophon	2020	CD
Jean-Philippe Collard	Bilkent Symphony Orchestra	Emil Tabakov	La Dolce Volta	2021	CD
Julius Asal	Danish National Symphony Orchestra	Fabio Luisi	Deutsche Grammophon	2025	CD
