= Shostakovich Quartet =

Russian string quartet

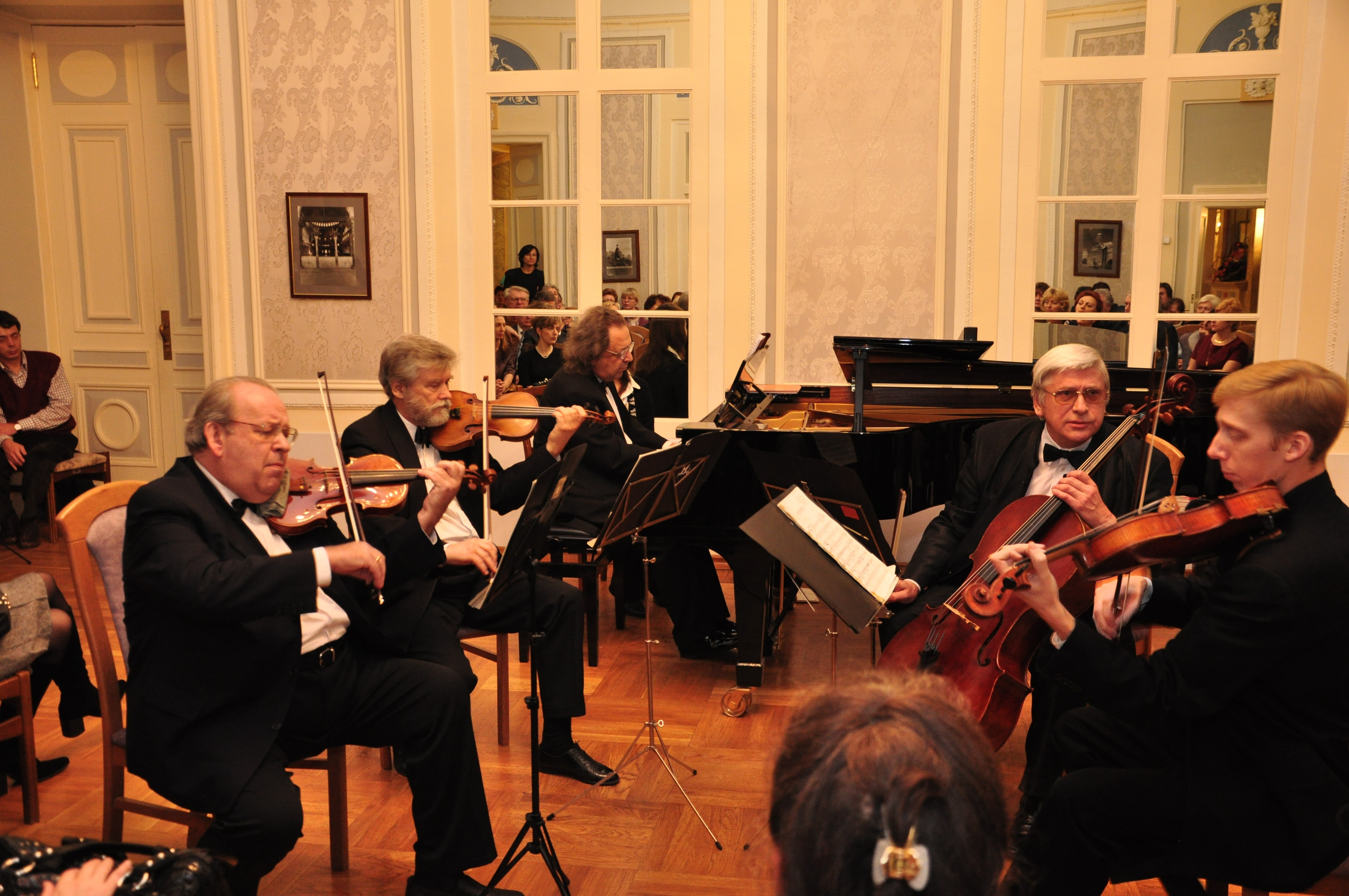
The International Festival of Arts "Art-November" 2008. Alexander Bonduryansky and the State Shostakovich String Quartet: Dmitry Shishlov, Sergey Pishchugin, Alexander Korchagin, Fedor Belugin. Mirror Hall, The State Institute for Art Studies, Moscow, Russian Federation.

The Shostakovich Quartet was a string quartet formed in September 1966 at the Moscow Conservatory, and which continued to perform for some 47 years (with varied line-up, but with the original 'cellist, Alexander Korchagin, remaining throughout) until the start of 2014. It is named after Dmitri Shostakovich.

== Formation and early years ==
The quartet was formed at the department of chamber ensemble and quartet in the class of R.R. Davidyan, by fourth-year students Andrei Shishlov, Alexander Balashov, Alexei Dyachkov and Alexander Korchagin. In their first concert on April 1, 1967 in the White Hall of the Conservatory (now the Myaskovsky Concert Hall), the musicians performed the first quartet of Beethoven, the third quartet of Hindemith and the fifth quartet of Shostakovich. In November 1967, the ensemble received the first prize at the Competition of the Moscow Conservatory and the Union of Composers of the USSR, dedicated to the 50th anniversary of the Soviet state. In 1968, the Quartet was admitted to an assistantship-internship for four full-time places (supervisor - R.R.Davidyan). At the same time, they were invited to work in the Moscow Regional Philharmonic. A few years later, the cellist and quartetist, Professor Sergei Shirinsky, a member of the Beethoven Quartet, played a significant role in the formation of the young ensemble.

A number of competition prizes followed, in particular third prize at the XIX ARD International Music Competition in Munich in 1970, and first prize at the XIII Leo Weiner International competition in Budapest in 1973. On February 23, 1979, by the Decree of the Government of the RSFSR, the team was named after Dmitri Shostakovich.

== Touring ==
The Quartet toured extensively- initially within the USSR, to venues both in larger and in more remote communities- and abroad- it toured in 47 countries on 4 continents, visiting several of them many times, for example the Netherlands, Germany, France, Italy, the USA, Canada, Australia, and Japan.

== Repertoire ==
The Quartet's repertoire included the 15 quartets by Dmitry Shostakovich, and other Russian composers such as Glinka, Tchaikovsky, Borodin, Glazunov, Grechaninov, Prokofiev and Stravinsky. They also performed music by European composers including Haydn, Mozart, Beethoven, Schubert, Schumann and Brahms, Debussy and Ravel.

The music of Shostakovich featured strongly in the quartet's output. The artists performed a cycle of his 15 quartets at the Edinburgh Festival (1988), in Amsterdam (Concertgebouw Music Center, Kleine Zaal, 1984-85), at the Santa Fe Chamber Music Festival (USA, 1991), at the Adelaide Festival of Arts ( Australia, 1986), at the Asolo Musica festival in Italy (1992), at the Kuhmo Chamber Music Festival (Finland, 1995); as well as in Paris (twice), Antwerp, Rotterdam, Utrecht (multiple times), Tokyo, Malmö, Rome, Naples, Palermo, Moscow (multiple times).

== Recordings ==
The Quartet also carried out studio work. They furnished the All-Union Radio Fund with many sound recordings. Over 50 records and CDs of the Quartet were released by Melodiya, Russkiy Disk, Vista Vera, Boheme (Russia); "Olympia", "Regis", "Alto" (Great Britain); Deutsche Grammophon (Germany), Ricordi (Italy), MFSL (USA), Toshiba EMI and Sacrambow (Japan).

== Awards ==
In 1987, the Quartet was awarded the Glinka State Prize of the RSFSR.

== Line-up ==
=== Quartet ===
Membership of the Quartet over the years was as follows:

- 1st violin: Andrey Shishlov (1966–2010), Alexander Trostyansky (2011), Graf Murzha (2012, 2013).
- 2nd violin: Alexander Balashov (1966–1975), Alexander Semyannikov (1976, 1977), Sergei Pischugin (1977–2012), Alexander Dogadaev (2012, 2013).
- Viola: Alexey Dyachkov (1966–1972), Alexander Galkovsky (1972–2004), Anton Yaroshenko (2004, 2005), Fedor Belugin (2005–2011), Yuri Tkanov (2011–2013).
- Cello: Alexander Korchagin (1966–2013)

=== Guest musicians ===
Over the years, the Quartet has performed in an ensemble with many musicians, including Tatiana Nikolaeva, Aleksey Nasedkin, Vladimir Krainev, Nikolai Petrov, Mikhail Voskresensky, Tigran Alikhanov, Oleksandr Bondurianskyi, Nikolai Lugansky, Nina Kogan, Tatiana Zheleznikova, Liana Isakadze, Viktor Tretyakov, Grigori Zhislin, Alexey Kozlov, Vladimir Sokolov and other Russian and foreign artists.
