= Brahms Trio =

Russian classical piano trio

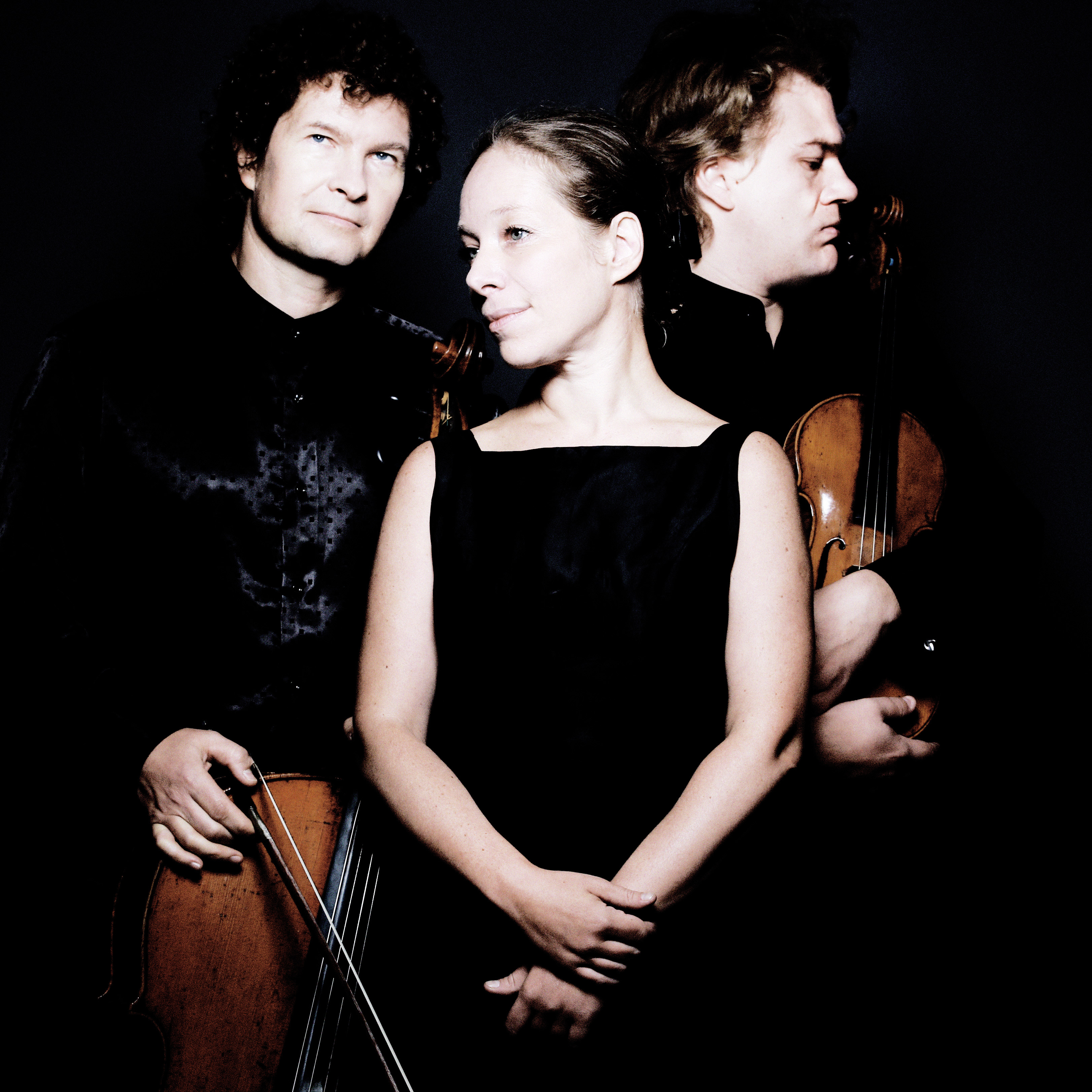

Background information
- Origin: Moscow, Russia
- Genres: Piano trio
- Years active: 1988–present
- Members: Natalia Rubinstein (piano), Nikolai Sachenko (violin); Kirill Rodin (cello)
- Website: www.brahms-trio.ru

The Brahms Trio is one of the leading chamber ensembles of Russia, a piano trio that unites violinist Nikolai Sachenko – winner of the Golden Medal of the XI International Tchaikovsky Competition in Moscow, cellist Kirill Rodin – winner of the Golden Medal of the VIII International Tchaikovsky Competition in Moscow, and pianist Natalia Rubinstein – First Prize winner of the Joseph Joachim Chamber Music Competition in Weimar and founder of the ensemble.

Founded in Moscow in 1988, the Brahms Trio has performed worldwide and has recorded much of Russian piano trio repertoire. The Brahms Trio made a contribution to enlarging the chamber repertoire by rediscovering unknown piano trios of Russian composers of the late-19th and early-20th century.

The musicians of the Brahms Trio are professors of the Moscow Tchaikovsky Conservatory, recipients of the awards ‘For the Prominent Contribution to the Development of Culture’ as well as the title ‘Merited Artist of Russia’.

== Early years ==
The Brahms Trio was formed in 1988 as a part of the chamber music class of Konstantin Oznobishchev at the Gnessin School of Music. Since 1990, the artistic biography of the Brahms Trio has been inextricably linked to the Moscow Tchaikovsky Conservatory. The chamber music classes of the legendary Moscow Conservatory professors Tatiana Gaidamovich and Oleksandr Bondurianskyi (The Moscow Trio) made an invaluable impact on the music formation and development of the ensemble. Furthermore, such masters as Tatiana Zelikman, Natalia Shakhovskaya, Valentin Berlinsky (Borodin Quartet), and Rudolf Barshai had a significant influence on the shaping of the performing style and career of the trio. In 1991, the ensemble was named after Johannes Brahms. That same year, the official debut of the Brahms Trio took place at the Small Hall of the Moscow Conservatory. In 1993, the Brahms Trio won the 2nd prize at the XIII International Chamber Music Competition in Trapani, Italy, and in 1996, the 1st prize at the First Joseph Joachim Chamber Music Competition in Weimar, Germany.

== Performing activities ==
Since the middle of the 90s, the Brahms Trio has had an active concert schedule, including regular appearances at major concert halls such as the Great Hall of the Tchaikovsky Conservatory in Moscow, the Saint Petersburg Philharmonia concert halls, the Brucknerhaus in Linz, the Stadtcasino Basel, the National Philharmonic in Warsaw, Vatroslav Lisinski Concert Hall in Zagreb, the Cemal Reşit Rey Concert Hall in Istanbul, the Seoul Arts Centre, as well as at festivals in Melbourne, Hong Kong, Ljubljana, Ohrid, Copenhagen, Brussels, and Paris among others. In 2015, the Brahms Trio was invited by ICA Classics to participate in the presentation of the memorial CD edition ’A Tribute to Rudolf Barshai’ in London.

The ensemble has collaborated with renowned artists such as Charles Neidich, Pavle Dešpalj, Andrei Gridchuk, Galina Pisarenko, Hibla Gerzmava, Yana Ivanilova, and Carmen Balthrop among others. In 1994, the annual Art-November Festival was established in Moscow by the Brahms Trio.

== The History of the Russian Piano Trio ==
In recent years, Russian chamber music has been at the heart of the artistic activities of the Brahms Trio. The ensemble's repertoire includes all the famous Russian piano trios and many previously unknown works by Russian composers of the Silver Age and Art Nouveau, including the piano trios of Vladimir Dyck, Sergei Yuferov, Konstantin Sternberg, Nikolai Lopatnikoff and others, that were premiered by the Brahms Trio. The first anthology of the Russian piano trio, recorded by the Brahms Trio, a series of 15 CDs, titled ’History of the Russian Piano Trio’, will be released by NAXOS from November 2020 onwards.

== Moscow Conservatory ==
Graduates of the Moscow Conservatory, the members of the Brahms Trio are extending the traditions of the Russian school of performing arts and music education established by Anton Rubinstein in the 19th century. Natalia Rubinstein has been a Professor of chamber music at the Moscow Conservatory since 2003, and Kirill Rodin has held a position as a Professor of cello since 1990. Their students regularly become laureates of Russian and international competitions, and many of them are actively performing and teaching at universities and conservatories all over the world. On the initiative of the Brahms Trio, an annual series of chamber music concerts with young performers is being held at the Moscow Conservatory and the State Institute for Art Studies in Moscow. In 2018, a similar concert series of Russian chamber music, performed by young ensembles of the Moscow Conservatory, has been established by the Brahms Trio at the Albert Long Hall of the Boğaziçi University in Istanbul.

Since 2009, the Brahms Trio has annually opened the chamber music concert season at the Moscow Tchaikovsky Conservatory.
