= Vladimir Ovchinnikov (pianist) =

Russian pianist

Vladimir Ovchinnikov Владимир Павлович Овчинников People's Artist of Russia
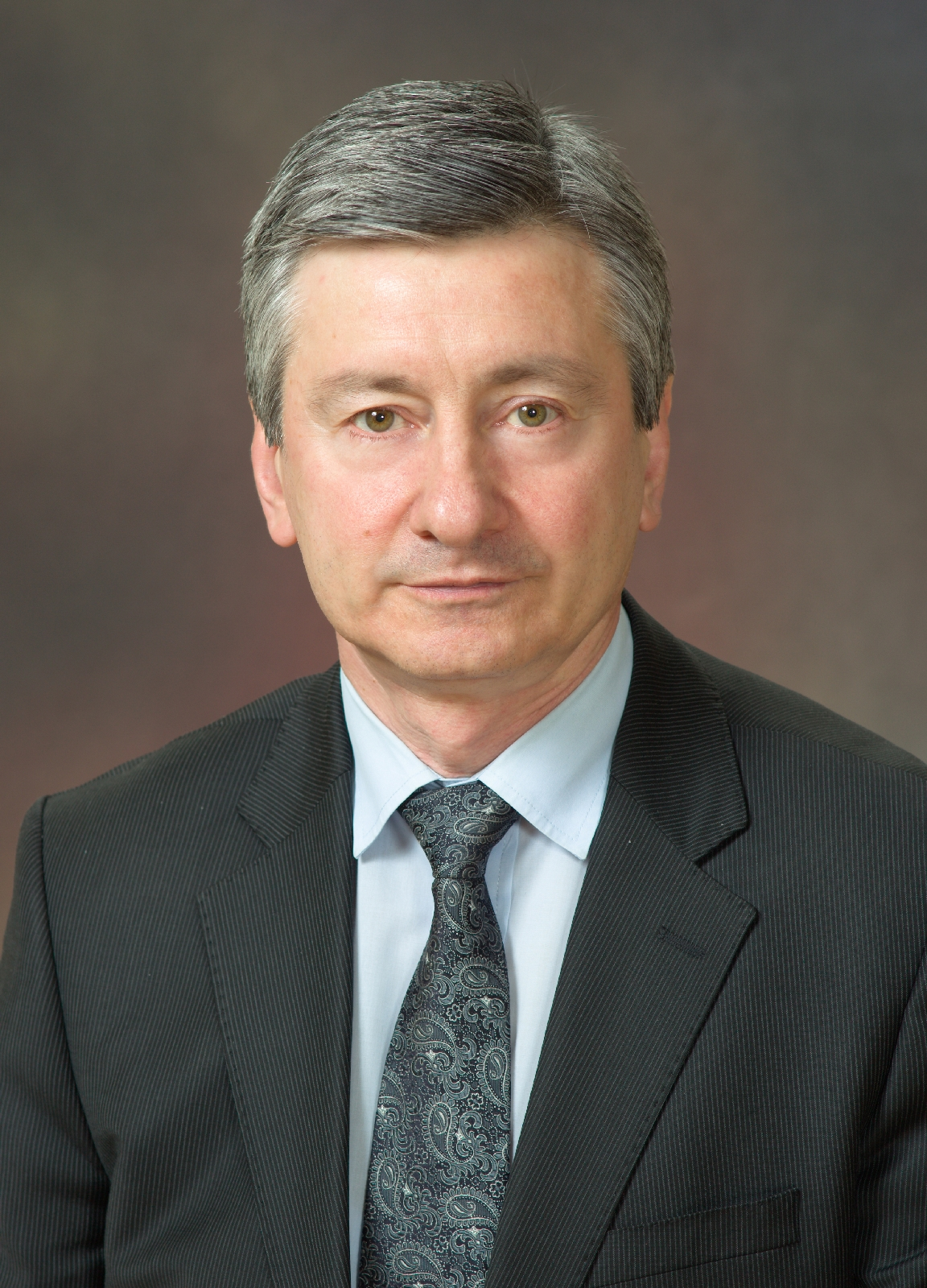

Background information
- Born: 2 January 1958 (age 68); Belebey
- Genres: Classical music
- Occupation: Pianist
- Instrument: Piano
- Labels: Collins Classics, EMI Records

Vladimir Pavlovich Ovchinnikov (Russian: Владимир Павлович Овчинников; born January 2, 1958) is a Russian pianist from Belebey, Bashkir ASSR. He is the only pianist ever to win the top prizes at both the International Tchaikovsky Competition in Moscow and the Leeds International Pianoforte Competition (1987). He has served as the Artistic Director of the Association of Tchaikovsky Competition Stars since 2000.

== Career ==
A graduate of the Moscow Conservatory where he studied with Aleksey Nasedkin, Vladimir Ovchinnikov is resident professor of piano at the Moscow Conservatory and guest professor of piano at Sakuyo University in Japan. He was awarded second place in the Montreal International Music Competition in 1980. In 1982, he was awarded joint second prize with Peter Donohoe in the International Tchaikovsky Competition (no first prize was awarded that year). In 1987, he was awarded first prize at the Leeds International Pianoforte Competition. In 2005, he received Russia's highest award and honor for musicians—the title "People's Artist of Russia", awarded by the Russian president.

He served as a chairman and a member of the jury at the International Tchaikovsky Competition, the International Tchaikovsky Competition for Young Musicians, the International Russian Rotary Children Music Competition and many others. He was appointed as the headmaster of the Central Music School of the Moscow Conservatory in 2011.

He appears regularly with such leading Russian orchestras as the Moscow Philharmonic; Moscow Radio Symphony and the St. Petersburg Philharmonic; he also has a long-standing relationship with the Russian State Symphony Orchestra, and was a special favorite of Yevgeny Svetlanov, with whom he toured France, the Netherlands, North and South America.

Concerto appearances in Europe and North America have included the following:

- BBC Philharmonic
- Bournemouth Symphony
- Chicago Symphony
- Danish Radio Symphony
- Hague Residentie Hallé
- Leipzig Gewandhaus
- Montreal Symphony
- National Symphony of Wales
- Netherlands Radio Symphony Orchestra
- Philharmonia
- Polish National Radio Orchestra
- Royal Liverpool Philharmonic
- Royal Philharmonic
- Royal Scottish National
- Slovak Philharmonic
- Ulster Orchestra
- Zurich Tonhalle

He has played under various conductors including:

- Yevgeny Svetlanov
- Vladimir Ashkenazy
- Matthias Bamert
- Rudolf Barshai
- Vladimir Fedoseyev
- Claus Peter Flor
- Valery Gergiev
- Mariss Jansons
- Neeme Jarvi
- Alexander Lazarev
- Libor Pesek
- Gennadi Rozhdestvensky
- Sir Simon Rattle
- Yuri Simonov
- Stanislaw Skrowaczewski
- Sir Georg Solti
- Walter Weller
- A. Vedernikov
- T. Sanderling
- J. Conlon
- M. Gorenstein
- M. Shostakovich

Among his recordings are Shostakovich's Piano Concerto No. 1 coupled with Mussorgsky's Pictures at an Exhibition (Collins Classics), Rachmaninoff's Études-Tableaux, and Liszt's Transcendental Études, and Prokofiev's Piano Sonatas (EMI). Other recordings include Grieg's sonatas for violin and piano, recorded together with the violinist Alexander Vinnitsky (Russian Seasons label), as well as works by Liszt, Tchaikovsky, S. Taneyev, and N. Rubinstein (Gold Club).
