= Alexander Malofeev =

Russian classical pianist

- Александр Малофеев
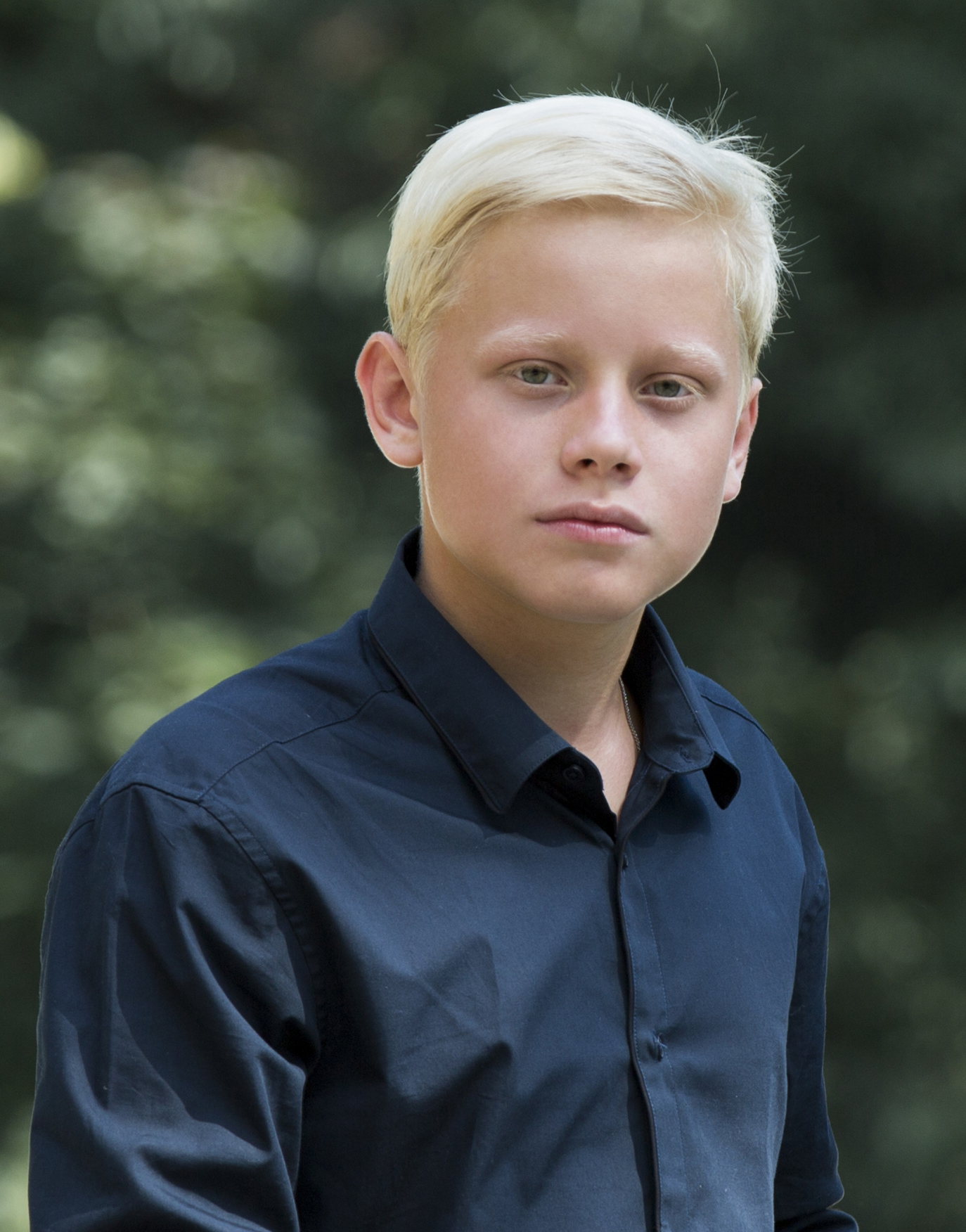
- Alexander Malofeev in August 2017
- Born: 21 October 2001 (age 24); Moscow, Russia
- Occupation: Classical pianist
- Years active: 2011–present
- Awards: 1st Prize and Gold medal at the 8th International Tchaikovsky Competition for Young Musicians, 2014; Grand Prix at the 1st Grand Piano Competition, 2016
- Website: https://alexander-malofeev.com

External videos
- Alexander Malofeev plays Prokofiev's Piano Concerto No. 3 in C major at the 2016 Grand Piano Competition (excerpt) on YouTube
- Interview (2019) on YouTube

Alexander Dmitrievitch Malofeev (Russian: Александр Дмитриевич Малофеев, romanized: Alexander Dmitrievitch Malofeyev; born 21 October 2001) is a Russian pianist. Described by Der Standard as "a world piano revolution" and hailed by Il Giornale for embodying "the piano mastery of the new millennium," he has established himself on the international stage.

== Biography ==
=== Early life and education ===
Alexander Malofeev was born to Dimitri Alexandrovitch Malofeev, an engineer, and medical practitioner Lyudmila Borisovna Malofeeva. He has an older sister and a younger brother. He began studying piano at the age of five. By the age of seven, he became interested in the music of Tchaikovsky, Shostakovich, Mahler, Rachmaninoff, and Prokofiev.

In 2014, Malofeev graduated with honors from the N. P. Osipov Children's Music School. He continued his studies with Elena Berezkina, who holds the honorary title "Honoured Cultural Worker of the Russian Federation," at the Gnessin State Musical College in Moscow, graduating in 2019. He subsequently studied at the Moscow Conservatory in the class of Sergei Dorensky, People's Artist of Russia.

Malofeev is critical of Russia's invasion of Ukraine and left the country at the end of 2022. Since then he has lived in Berlin.

=== Career ===
Malofeev gained international recognition at the 8th International Tchaikovsky Competition for Young Musicians held in Moscow in June and July 2014, where at just thirteen years old he won first prize and gold medal. Two years later, he was awarded the Grand Prix at the 1st Grand Piano Competition – International Competition for Young Pianists in Moscow. In 2019, he won second prize and silver medal at the 1st China International Music Competition. He is also the recipient of numerous other international prizes. At the opening of the International Piano Festival of Brescia and Bergamo in April 2017 in Italy, he was awarded the Premio Giovane Talento Musicale dell'anno 2017 (Best Young Musician of 2017).

As a soloist, Malofeev has performed with Russia's leading orchestras: the Mariinsky Theatre Orchestra, the Tchaikovsky Symphony Orchestra, the National Philharmonic of Russia, the Moscow Virtuosi, and the New Russia' State Symphony Orchestra under the batons of conductors such as Valery Gergiev, Kazuki Yamada, Yuri Tkachenko, and Vladimir Spivakov. He has also performed with major international orchestras including the Philadelphia Orchestra, the Boston Symphony Orchestra, the Orchestra dell'Accademia Nazionale di Santa Cecilia, and the Lucerne Festival Orchestra . He regularly collaborates with leading conductors including Michael Tilson Thomas, Yannick Nézet-Séguin, JoAnn Falletta, and Riccardo Chailly, who has observed that Malofeev "already possesses depth as well as technical and musical abilities, along with a memorization skill".

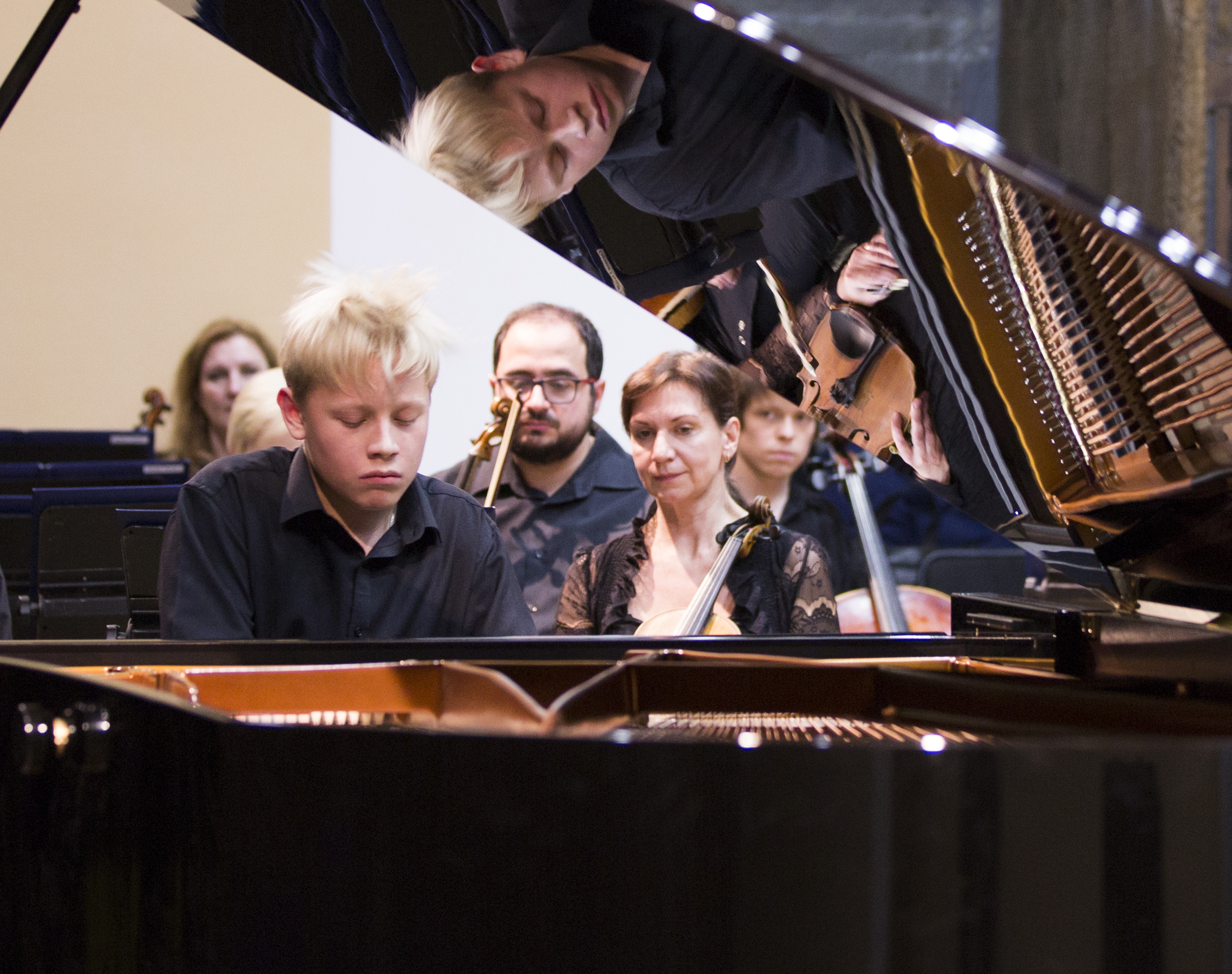
Alexander Malofeev playing the piano in November 2017

Malofeev's scheduled performance in early March 2022 with the Montreal Symphony Orchestra, to be led by conductor Michael Tilson Thomas, was cancelled in response to the Russian invasion of Ukraine, despite his public opposition to the war; "every Russian will feel guilty for decades because of the terrible and bloody decision that none of us could influence and predict", as Malofeev had put it. Malofeev and Tilson Thomas were finally able to perform together at Tanglewood (summer home of the Boston Symphony Orchestra) in August 2022 where Malofeev delivered a performance of Rachmaninoff's Third Concerto.

Malofeev left Russia at the end of 2022 and has since lived in Berlin.

== Debut Album: Forgotten Melodies ==
Sony Classical released Malofeev's debut album, Forgotten Melodies in February 2026. The album features works by four composers who were all born in Russia but died far from their homeland: Alexander Glazunov (Paris, 1936), Mikhail Glinka (Berlin, 1857), Sergei Rachmaninoff (Beverly Hills, 1943), and Nikolai Medtner (London, 1951).

Malofeev explains the conceptual thread connecting these composers: "They all share a similar feeling of nostalgia. But you cannot really figure out which moment in time they are actually nostalgic for. It's almost as if they are nostalgic for a very similar setting which never really existed in history. It's like it is totally made up, almost a dream world—and you can find it everywhere on this album".

The album includes Medtner's cycle Forgotten Melodies and Rachmaninoff's Second Piano Sonata. "I've loved Rachmaninoff for as long as I can remember," Malofeev admits, referring to both his composing and piano playing: "His freedom, his spirit, his hands, his genius". For the album, Malofeev deliberately chose the revised version of the Sonata, as it is shorter, more concise, and more economical in its writing—and therefore closer to Medtner's aesthetic.

The album's first single, "Forgotten Melodies I, Op. 38/VI. Canzona serenata," was released in advance of the full album.

== Critical Acclaim ==
The international press has hailed Malofeev as a "Russian genius" (Corriere della Sera), and his performances have been described as possessing a "magnetic pull" and the ability to create a "weightlessly singing tone" (Frankfurter Allgemeine Zeitung). The Guardian called him "an exciting prospect, with a superb technique".

Following his debut at the Vienna Musikverein in 2022, Der Standard proclaimed him a "world piano revolution," and after a recent engagement with the Deutsches Symphonie-Orchester Berlin, the Tagesspiegel hailed him as the "discovery of the evening".

== Discography ==
- Alexander Malofeev's debut; DVD; recorded by Master Performers label; Queensland Conservatorium Griffith University, Australia; June 2016.
- Forgotten Melodies; Sony Classical; released February 2026.
