= Kirill Rodin =

Russian cellist and professor of cello

- Born: Moscow, Russia
- Genres: Classical
- Occupation: Cellist
- Instrument: Cello

Kirill Rodin, also known as Kyril or Kyrill Rodin, is a Russian cellist and a professor of cello. He performs as a soloist in the Moscow State Philharmonic and is the cellist of the Tchaikovsky String Quartet. He has also performed as a member of the Brahms Trio with the pianist Natalia Rubinstein and violinist Nikolai Sachenko.

== Early life and education ==
Rodin was born in Moscow in 1963. He started practicing cello at seven years old, as he participated in classes held by Vera Birina at the Gnessin Special Music School in Moscow. He then continued his studies with Natalia Shakhovskaya at the Moscow Conservatory. During his studies, he found success in a number of music competitions. He won the first prize at the XIV Int. Jeunesses musicales competition (Belgrade, 1984, 1 prize and special prize Golden Harp, chairman of the jury was a great André Navarra). VIII International Tchaikovsky competition in Moscow, 1986 bring him First prize and Gold medal.

== Career ==
Rodin has performed in 50 different countries on all five continents, including the United States, Japan, South Korea, Australia, Singapore, and New Zealand. While he travels to various countries to perform on stage, Rodin is a professor at the Moscow Tchaikovsky conservatory, teaches cello in China and held master classes in Germany, Australia, Spain, Argentina, Japan, South Korea, China and Australia. Rodi has also served as a jury in several international cello competitions.

Rodin's recordings include the music of Bach, Beethoven, Brahms, Haydn, Grieg, Tchaikovsky, Rachmaninov, Shostakovich, Khrennikov, Myaskovsky and Piazolla. He has also recorded modern Chinese music.

In 2016 Rodin participated in the Schwingungen Trio with violinist Sanghee Sania Cheong and pianist Sang-Eil Shin with whom he played Glinka's Trio Pathetique in D minor, Beethoven's Piano Trio in D major, and Piano Trio No. 1 in D minor by Anton Arensky.
