= Vladimir Sokolov (musician) =

Russian clarinetist (1936–1999)

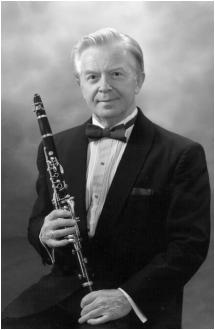

Background information
- Instruments: clarinet

Vladimir Aleksandrovich Sokolov (Russian: Влади́мир Алекса́ндрович Соколо́в; 12 February 1936 in Ubshor, Syktyvdinsky District, Komi Republic – 13 November 1999 in Moscow) was a Russian clarinetist.

Sokolov studied at the music college in Syktyvkar and the Moscow State Conservatoire. He won first prize in the 1963 All-Union Competition of Musicians in Leningrad. He has performed with the Beethoven Quartet, Komitas Quartet, Shostakovich Quartet and Borodin Quartet. From 1963 to 1990 he was the solo clarinetist in the State Academic Symphony Orchestra of Russia (SASO). He co-founded the SASO Woodwind Quintet. He has taught at the Moscow Conservatoire since 1974 and at the Central Music School since 1975. He created the Sergey Rozanov International Clarinet competition. Sokolov was titled "Merited Artist of Russian Federation" in 1974 and "People’s Artist of Russia" in 1986.
