= Bui Cong Duy =

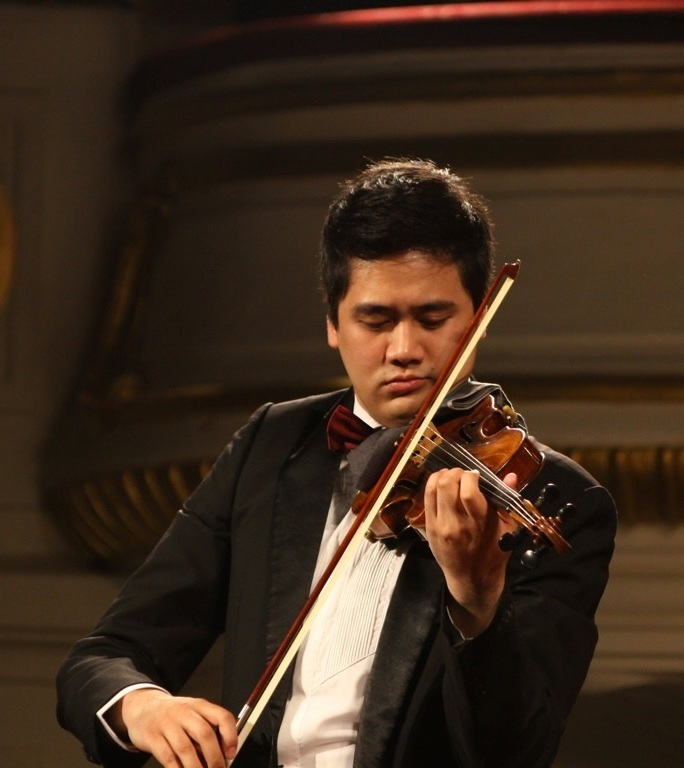

Background information
- Born: Bui Cong Duy; February 2, 1981 (age 45)
- Origin: Ho Chi Minh City, Vietnam
- Occupation: Violinist

Bui Cong Duy (born February 2, 1981), is a well-known Vietnamese violinist. He started to play the violin at the age of four under instruction of his father, Professor Dr. Bui Cong Thanh. He won scores of prizes, including the first prize and golden medal of International Tchaikovsky Competition for Young Musicians in Saint Petersburg, Russia. He is working in Hanoi now. He spends time to educate students of the Vietnam National Academy of Music and plays at many big concert events.

== Life ==
In 1989, he won the second prize of Young Talent Music Contest and the first prize of Most Talented Violinist Award at the Concours Autumn in 1990. From 1991 to 1998 he was intermediate at Glinka Music College, Novosibirsk city, Russia under the instruction of Professor M. Kuzina and Professor A. Gvozdev. He received the Sibiri Young Talent honor scholarship and the Young Talent scholarship from Russian Ministry of culture. He won scores of prizes, thereunder the first prize and gold medal of the III International Tchaikovsky Competition for Young Musicians in Saint Petersburg, Russia. From 1998 to 2003 he was undergraduate at Tchaikovsky National Music College in Moscow, Russia, under the instruction of people's artist, Professor I. V. Bochkova and got the excellent degree. From 2003 to 2006, he was postgraduate of performing at Tchaikovski Music College under the instruction of Professor I. V Bochkova and simultaneously was her assistant. In 2006, he worked for Virtuoso Moscow Chamber Orchestra under the instruction of Professor V. Spivakov.

Besides being a violinist, Bui Cong Duy is also a teacher of talented students, many of whom have won prizes:

- Nguyen Linh Uyen (16 years of age) - 2nd prize of the Mozart International String Competition 2011, in Thailand
- Trinh Dan Nhi (10 years of age) - 2nd prize of the 4th ASEAN International Concerto Competition 2011, in Indonesia
- Bui Cam Ly - 3rd prize of the National Music of 2007 Autumn, and 3rd place of the 3rd ASEAN International Concerto Competition, in Jakarta, 2009
- Tran My Dung (8 years of age) - first prize of the 5th ASEAN International Concerto Competition in Jakarta, 2013
- Vu Thi Khanh Linh - 3rd prize of The 4th Thailand international strings competition 2015 in Bangkok, and 2nd prize of the National Music of Autumn Competition 2019 in Hanoi

== Performances ==
- Concert for President Vladimir Putin in Ha Noi, Viet Nam, December 12, 2013
- Concert tours of Beethoven in Bonn, Germany
- With world-famous conductor Lior Shambadal
- Concert for Italian President Giorgio Napolitano in Rome, 2013
- Concert with the Vietnam National Orchestra at La Fenice, Venice và Teatro del Maggio Musicale Fiorentino, 2013
- Concert for President Park Geun Hye in Ha Noi, 2013
- New Year Concert tour with Trondheim Soloists in Norway, January 2014
- Tour concert with the Berliner Symphoniker at Herbert von Karajan, February 2, 2014

== Notable works ==
- Violin Concerto in D major, Op 61 (II. Larghetto)- Beethoven
- Violin Concerto In E Minor, Op.64 - Felix Mendelssohn

- Salut D'Amour - Edward Elgar
- Concerto Max Bruch No.1 (I), (II), (III)

== Prizes ==
- The first prize of Demidov International String Competition 1993
- The first prize of Z. Bron International String Competition 1995
- The first prize and golden medal of International Tchaikovsky Competition for Young Musicians (1997) in Saint Petersburg, Russia
