= Veriko Tchumburidze =

Georgian-Turkish classical violinist (born 1996)

Veriko Tchumburidze ვერიკო ჭუმბურიძე
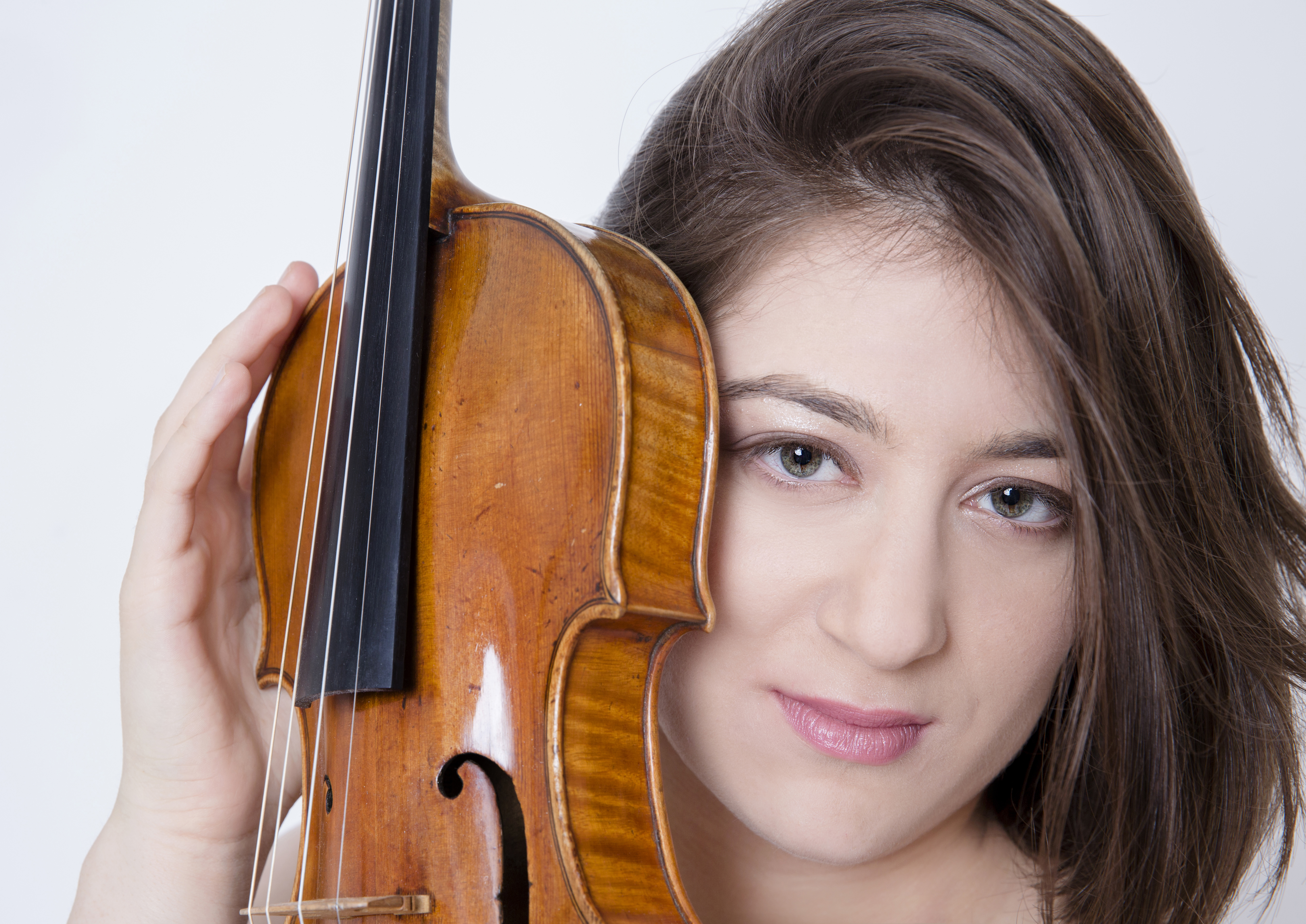

Background information
- Born: 20 April 1996 (age 29); Adana, Turkey
- Origin: Georgian
- Genres: Classical music, chamber music
- Occupation: Musician
- Instrument: Violin
- Label: Sony Classical Records
- Website: http://www.verikotchumburidze.com

Veriko Tchumburidze (Georgian: ვერიკო ჭუმბურიძე; born 20 April 1996) is a Georgian / Turkish classical violinist who won 1st prize at the 15th Henryk Wieniawski Violin Competition in 2016 at age of 20.

== Early life and education ==
Veriko Tchumburidze was born into a Georgian musical family in Adana, southern Turkey, in 1996.

Her father David Tchumburidze plays oboe and her mother Lili Tchumburidze is a violinist; both are teaching at Mersin University State Conservatory since 1995; her sister Sofiko is a violinist as well.

Veriko has started playing the violin at the age of three and a half with her mother Lili. She initially studied at Mersin University State Conservatory with Selahattin Yunkuş and Lili Tchumburidze. In 2010 she started to study with Dora Schwarzberg at the University of Music and Performing Arts Vienna in Vienna as a scholar of the Young Musicians on World Stages (YMWS by Pekinel sisters) project. Since 2015 she has been mentored by Ana Chumachenco at University of Music and Performing Arts Munich.

She has also participated in the masterclasses of Shlomo Mintz, Albert Markov and Igor Ozim, in the Seiji Ozawa Academy Masterclass and, in Switzerland, the Verbier Festival Academy.

Since 2016 Veriko Tchumburidze plays a Giambattista Guadagnini violin, made in Milan in 1756 and generously loaned by the Deutsche Stiftung Musikleben.

== Career ==
Since winning the 2016 Henryk Wieniawski Violin Competition at the age of 20, Veriko Tchumburidze has performed as a soloist, chamber musician and recording artist. In 2013, Turkish classical music publication, Andante, named her the country's Best Emerging Musician. She has also won gold medal at the International Tchaikovsky Competition for Young Musicians in 2012, Montreux / Switzerland.

She has appeared with the Borusan Istanbul Philharmonic Orchestra (opening the Istanbul International Music Festival), Brandenburgisches Staatsorchester Frankfurt (Oder), Orchester Musikkollegium Winterthur, Cape Town Philharmonic Orchestra, Mariinsky Theatre Orchestra, Melbourne Symphony Orchestra (Sidney Myer Music Bowl), Lahti Symphony Orchestra and Sinfonia Varsovia as well as the Munich Chamber Orchestra and Zurich Chamber Orchestra.

She has collaborated with such conductors as Łukasz Borowicz, Ruben Gazarian, Sascha Goetzel, Howard Griffiths, Gemma New, Michael Sanderling, Aziz Shoskakimov and Dima Slobodeniouk.

Her festival engagements have included the Beethoven Easter Festival, Menuhin Festival Gstaad, Olympus Musical Festival, Rosendal Festival and Schleswig-Holstein Musik Festival, performing with, among others, Leif Ove Andsnes, Sol Gabetta, Nicholas Angelich, Lisa Batiashvili, Gérard Caussé, Clemens Hagen, Maxim Vengerov and Tabea Zimmermann.

As a keen exponent of chamber music, she partners in recital with pianists Ketevan Sepashvili and Mamikon Nakhapetov, and was formerly a member of Trio Arte, a piano trio which in 2016 won first prize at the Pietro Argento International Music Competition in Gioia del Colle, Italy. 2016 also brought the world premiere at the Istanbul Music Festival of Ludus Modalis, a work dedicated to Trio Arte by the distinguished Turkish composer Özkan Manav.

== Recordings ==
She recorded Antonín Vranický’s Violin Concerto in C for Sony Classical Records with the Munich Chamber Orchestra and conductor Howard Griffiths. Her recording on the Klanglogo label of John Williams’ music for the film Schindler's List, with Howard Griffiths conducting the Brandenburgisches Kammerorchester Berlin, led to a headlining appearance, under the aegis of the Orpheum Foundation for the Advancement of Young Soloists, at the opening concert of the 2016 Zurich Film Festival at the Zürich Opera House.

== Private life ==
Tchumburidze has resided in Munich.
