= Nikolai Sachenko =

Russian violinist (born 1977)

- Николай Саченко
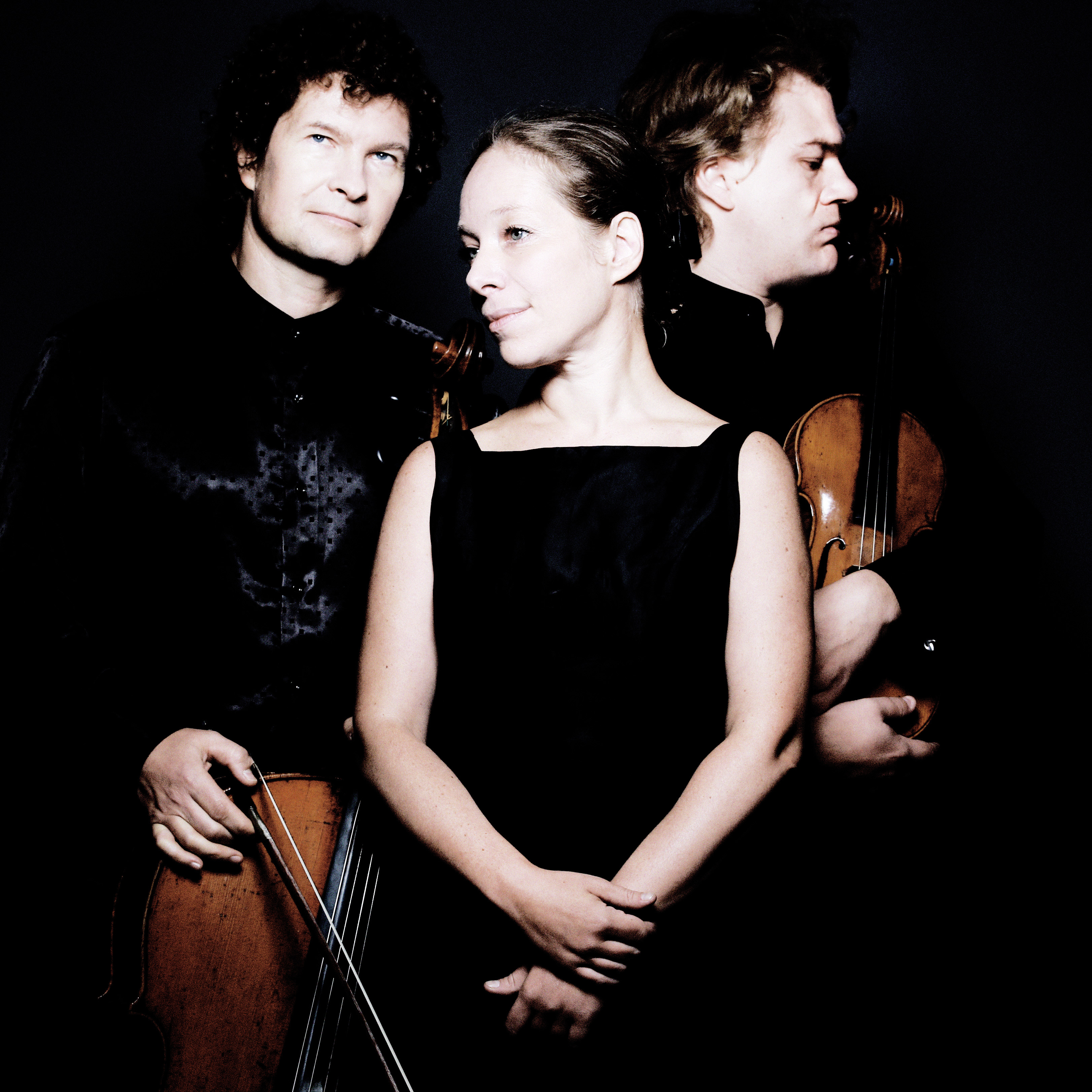
- The Brahms Trio, from left to right: Kirill Rodin, Natalia Rubinstein, and Nikolai Sachenko
- Born: 1977 (age 48–49); Alma Ata, Kazakh SSR
- Education: Moscow Conservatory
- Occupation: Violinist

Nikolai Sachenko (Russian: Николай Саченко; born 1977) is a Russian violinist. He was awarded the top prize at the International Tchaikovsky Competition in 1998. Since 2008 he has been a member of the Brahms Trio, with pianist Natalia Rubinstein and cellist Kirill Rodin. In 2022 he joined the Borodin Quartet as first violinist.

== Biography ==
Sachenko was born in 1977 in Alma Ata, the capital of the Kazakh Soviet Socialist Republic (now Kazakhstan). When he was six years old, he began studying violin at a music school in Petropavlovsk-Kamchatsky. He moved to Moscow in 1987 to study at the Moscow Conservatory, where he was sponsored by the New Names Foundation and trained with professors such as Igor Bezrodny. In 1995, Sachenko participated in the 3rd International Violin Competition Leopold Mozart, where he finished in 4th place and won the Audience Prize. At the age of 21, he was named the top violinist at the 11th International Tchaikovsky Competition in 1998, playing a violin made by the 18th-century French luthier Jean-Baptiste Salomon. Russia dominated the competition that year: in addition to Sachenko, the pianist Denis Matsuev and the cellist Denis Shapovalov were awarded the top prizes in their respective categories. Sachenko embarked on an international concert tour after winning the competition.

In 2005 he became the concertmaster of the Novaya Rossiya State Symphony Orchestra, conducted by Yuri Bashmet. The following year, he became a soloist with the Moscow State Philharmonic Society. Sachenko has been a member of the Brahms Trio since 2008, performing with the pianist Natalia Rubinstein and the cellist Kirill Rodin. The trio's focus is on infrequently-performed piano trios by Russian composers from the late 19th and early 20th centuries. His performances as part of the Brahms Trio have received critical praise. Tully Potter, writing for Musical Opinion, commented that Sachenko's "focused playing is an unfailing pleasure", and David Morrison of Fanfare described his playing as "eloquently expressive and impassioned". In 2017 he was named a Merited Artist of the Russian Federation. In September 2022 he joined the Borodin Quartet as new first violinist following the retirement of Ruben Aharonian.

As of 2021, Sachenko plays a violin made by the Italian luthier Francesco Rugeri in 1697 that belongs to Russia's State Collection of Unique Musical Instruments. He has cited the violinists Yehudi Menuhin and Isaac Stern and the cellist Mstislav Rostropovich among his influences.
