= Xiamen Philharmonic Orchestra =

Orchestra based in Xiamen, China

The Xiamen Philharmonic Orchestra (XPO) (Chinese: 厦门爱乐乐团) is based in Xiamen, Fujian Province, the People's Republic of China. It is one of the top orchestras in China, and the only non-state-owned and self-financing orchestra in the country. Founded in 1998, XPO plays the majority of its concerts at Music Island Philharmonic Hall, Xiamen. XPO's founder is Zheng Xiaoying, and the current artistic director is Fu Renchang.

Under the dynamic directorship of Zheng, the orchestra's reputation has increased rapidly. Zheng attempts to make "symphonic music more accessible to those not accustomed to it." The orchestra gives more than 80 concerts annually, including education programs and regular weekend concerts in Xiamen. XPO has performed throughout China, East Asia and Europe, with over 350 guest musicians. The XPO "stands shoulder to shoulder with the finest State symphony orchestras of China."

XPO was founded by Zheng in 1998. The orchestra started out with 30 members and had 80 by 2002. The XPO was created by an invitation to Zheng from the local Xiamen government.

XPO has made short tours to 41 cities across China. In 2002, the Orchestra performed in three cities in Japan and received high praise from world-class juries in the Fourth International Tchaikovsky Competition for Young Musicians held in Xiamen. In 2003, XPO performed in Hong Kong and participated in the Shanghai International Art Festival. In October 2006, it took part in the International Chorus Competition in Xiamen, and in the same Autumn, they performed in Taiwan. In April 2007, XPO made a European tour, holding very successful concerts dedicated to Chinese symphonic compositions in France, Germany, Austria and Italy. The orchestra has performed together with world famous musicians including Edward Auer and Midori Gotō.

Coming from all across China, the 80 orchestra members are devoting their efforts to the objective of developing Xiamen into the "Music Island of the Orient" and ensuring that it can live up to this name.
