= Vladislav Chernushenko =

Russian conductor (1936–2026)

Vladislav Chernushenko Владислав Чернушенко
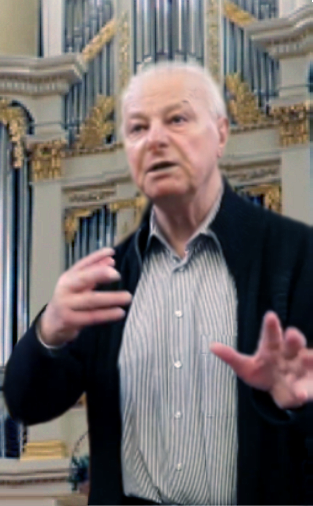
- Chernushenko in 2020

Background information
- Born: Vladislav Alexandrovich Chernushenko; 14 January 1936; Leningrad, Russian SFSR, Soviet Union
- Died: 27 January 2026 (aged 90) Saint Petersburg, Russia
- Genres: Classical
- Occupation: Conductor

Vladislav Alexandrovich Chernushenko (Note: Russian: Владислав Александрович Чернушенко, romanized: Vladislav Aleksandrovich Chernushenko) (Russian: Владисла́в Алекса́ндрович Чернуше́нко; 14 January 1936 – 27 January 2026) was a Soviet and Russian conductor, who was a People's Artist of the USSR and State Prize laureate. He was educated at the Choir School of the State Cappella, where his teacher was Pallady Bogdanov, and later moved to the Leningrad Conservatory where he was under the guidance of Ilya Musin, Yevgeny Mravinsky, and Nikolay Rabinovich. In 1974 he became principal conductor of the Saint Petersburg State Academic Capella. From 1979 to 2002 he was rector of the Saint Petersburg Conservatory.

Chernushenko died on 27 January 2026, at the age of 90.

== Awards and honours ==
- Winner of the international competition in Debrecen, Hungary (1970)
- Honored Artist of the RSFSR (1978)
- Winner of the international competition in Gorizia, Italy (1979)
- Laureate of the Glinka State Prize (1981)
- People's Artist of the RSFSR (1986)
- People's Artist of the USSR (1991)
- Order of Friendship (1996)
- Winner of the French Academy of Arts Award (1999)
- Laureate of the State Prize of the Russian Federation in the field of literature and art (1994)
- Silver medal of the Holy Grand Duke Alexander Nevsky (2004)
- Order "For Merit to the Fatherland" III and IV degrees (2019, 2005)
- Order of Holy Prince Daniel of Moscow, II degree (2006)
- Honorary Citizen of Saint Petersburg (2016)
