= Moscow City Symphony — Russian Philharmonic =

Moscow City Symphony - Russian Philharmonic
- Orchestra
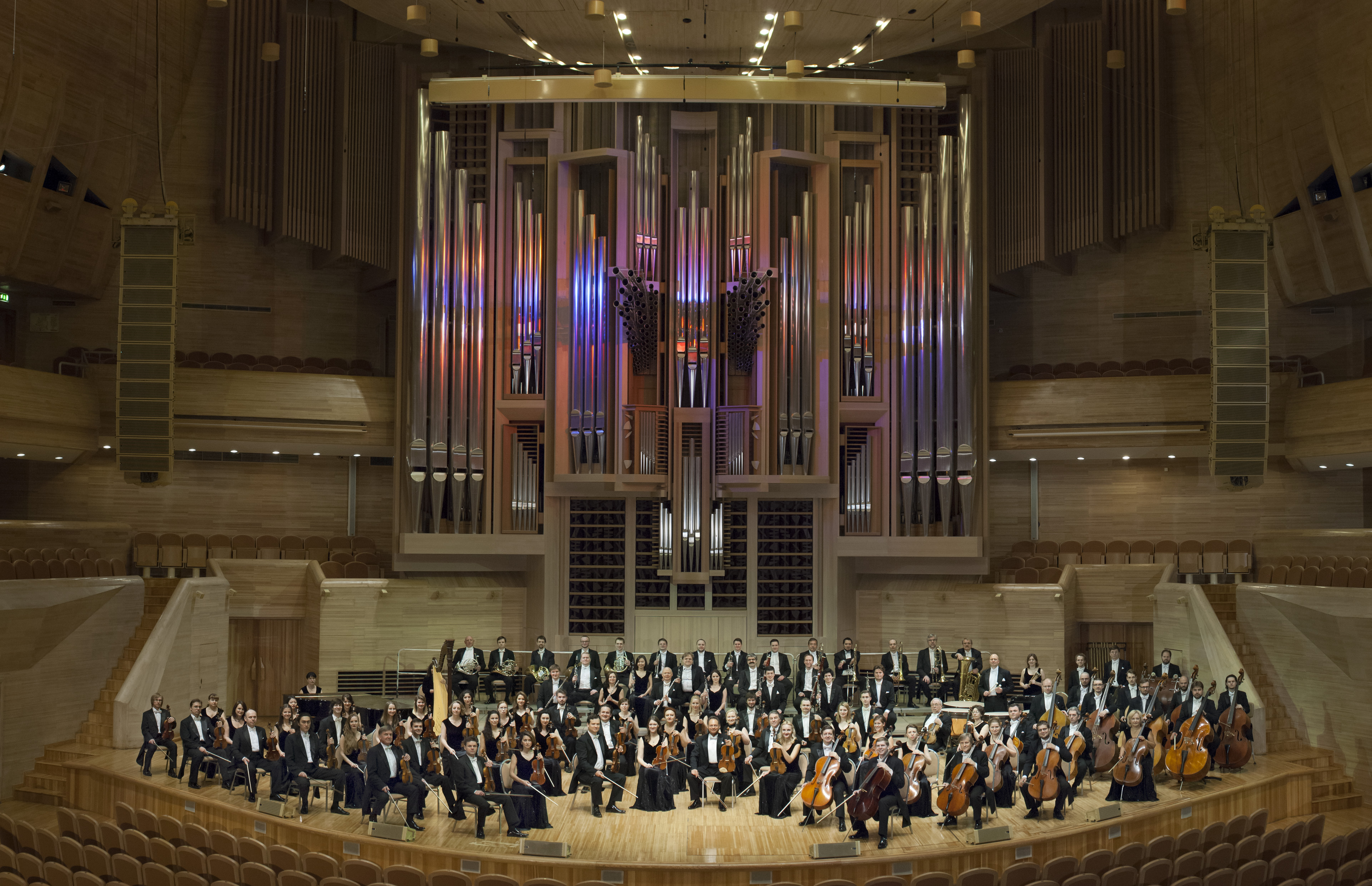
- Founded: 2000
- Concert hall: Moscow International House of Music
- Principal conductor: Dmitri Jurowski
- Website: orchestra.ru/en

The Moscow City Symphony was established in 2000 by the Moscow City Government. It is resident orchestra at the Moscow International House of Music. The principal conductors: Alexander Vedernikov (until 2004), Maxim Fedotov (from 2006 until 2011), Dmitri Jurowski (from 2011 until 2018), Fabio Mastrangelo (since 2018).

Recordings of the orchestra have been released on Deutsche Grammophon and Naxos Records, amongst others.

== Discography ==
- Instrumental masterpieces by J.-S. Bach
- Tchaikovsky. Ballet Suites (1996, Arts Music CMBH)
- Russian Cinema Music (1997, PolyGram Russia)
- Alla Pavlova. Symphony No 1, Symphony No 3 (2003, Naxos)
- Khachaturian, A.I.: Cello Concerto / Concerto-Rhapsody for Cello and Orchestra (Yablonsky, Moscow City Symphony, Fedotov) Naxos 8.570463
