= Vladimir Ponkin =

Russian conductor

- Владимир Александрович Понькин
- Born: Irkutsk
- Education: Moscow Conservatory
- Occupations: Conductor, professor

Vladimir Ponkin is a Russian principal conductor, Professor and a recipient of both the Golden Mask and People's Artist of Russia award from Irkutsk. He is also a 2001 medal recipient For the merits in development of Cuban region and a 2006 cross recipient of The Defender of Russia as well as For the Love and Faith to the Homeland medal both of which were 1st grade.

== Career ==
Vladimir Ponkin was a 1980 World Rupert Foundation Competition winner and that same year was hired by the Chamber Opera Theater, with which he traveled through Russia and into Riga and Alma-Ata. During the 1990s, he became head conductor of the Kraków Philharmonic Orchestra and was invited by Pope John Paul II the same year to perform at Vatican City.

From 1990 to 2004 Ponkin was both the music director and principal conductor of the State Academic Symphony Orchestra of the Russian Federation, a division of Moscow Philharmony. In 1996 he obtained the same position at the Stanislavski and Nemirovich-Danchenko Moscow Academic Music Theatre where he produced operas such as Nikolai Rimsky-Korsakov's The Tale of Tsar Saltan and Giuseppe Verdi's Othello as well as ballets such as Sergei Prokofiev's Romeo and Juliet and Mikhail Bronner's The Taming of The Shrew among others which brought him fame and success.

In 1999 he became principal conductor of the Helikon Opera and have produced Russian operas such as Dmitri Shostakovich's opera called Lady Macbeth of the Mtsensk District and Rimsky-Korsakov's Kashchey the Deathless as well as operas by French and German opera writers such as Dialogues of the Carmelites by Francis Poulenc, Alban Berg's Lulu and Umberto Giordano's Siberia among other national and international operas. From 2002 and 2006 he held the same position at the Galina Vishnevskaya Opera Center where he did such operas as Mikhail Glinka's Ruslan and Lyudmila, Rigoletto by Verdi, as well as Charles Gounod's Faust. He also performed Krzysztof Penderecki's The Resurrection in Swedish capitol Stockholm. In January 2005 he became chief conductor of the Russian National Academic Folk Orchestra and then became principal conductor of the Kuban Symphony Orchestra in Krasnodar, Russia. In 2012, for his achievements into the development of the Russian culture and its arts, the Helikon Opera have awarded him with the Order of Friendship.
