= Zheng Xiaoying =

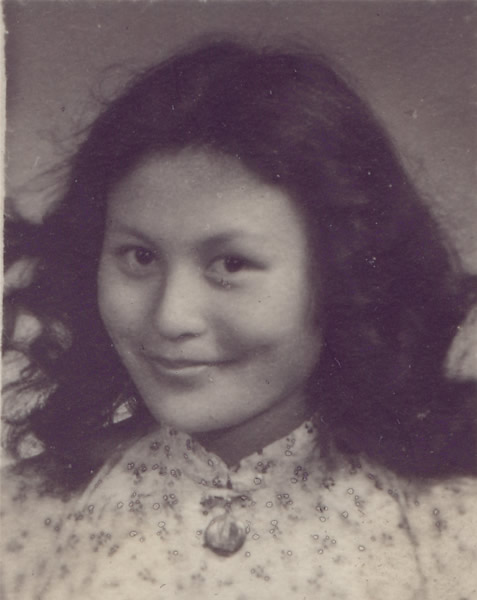
- Zheng in 1948

Background information
- Born: September 28, 1929 (age 96); Yongding, Longyan, China
- Genres: Classical
- Occupation: Conductor
- Years active: 1956–2013
- Formerly of: China National Opera House, Xiamen Philharmonic Orchestra

Zheng Xiaoying (Chinese: 郑小瑛; pinyin: Zhèng Xiǎoyīng; born 28 September 1929) is a Chinese conductor and was the first female conductor in China. Zheng was the chief conductor of the China National Opera House (CNOH) and she formed and conducted the Xiamen Philharmonic Orchestra. She was formerly the director of the Conducting Department of the Beijing Central Conservatory of Music (CCOM) in Beijing.

== Biography ==
Zheng was born in Yongding District, Longyan, Fujian province in 1929. Zheng is of Hakka descent and felt that her family valued education. Zheng first studied at Jingling Women's University in Nanjing in 1947. Zheng took part in the Chinese Communist Revolution, where her job was to train a large song and dance troupe and conduct Chinese operas. She was working in Henan province.

Later, Zheng studied at the CCOM in 1952. Her first conducting teacher was Nicolai Tumascheve, who taught chorus-conducting. In 1955, she was sent on a course taught by Soviet conductors where she was the only woman in the class. She taught at the CCOM between 1956 and 1960. Zheng then studied opera conducting at the Moscow Conservatory between 1960 and 1963. In 1962, she was the first Chinese conductor to conduct an opera in a foreign setting when she conducted "Tosca" at the Moscow National Theater. After Moscow, she returned to CCOM and taught until the Cultural Revolution interrupted her work. During the revolution, there "was no classical music in China".

Zheng became the Principal Conductor at the CNOH in Beijing in 1977. She was involved in the "influential performances" of The God of Flowers, La Traviata, Carmen, Le Nozze di Figaro and Madam Butterfly. In the 1980s, she helped French conductor, Jean Perrison, make the first Chinese translation of Carmen when he visited Beijing.

In 1993, she founded the first women' symphony orchestra in China, the Ai Yue Nu Philharmonic Orchestra, which has performed around the world. The group plays both Western and Chinese music. Zheng and the women's orchestra performed at the Fourth World Conference on Women.

When Zheng retired from the China National Opera in 1997, she moved to Xiamen. In 1998, she started the Xiamen Philharmonic Orchestra (XPO), a non-State musical ensemble. Zheng was a torchbearer in Xiamen for the 2008 Olympic Games. In 2011, she was honored with the Golden Melody Prize from the Chinese Musicians' Association. Zheng received the 2012 Chinese Cultural Figure title for her contribution to music education and conducting. She retired from the XPO in 2013. In 2014, she was honored by the CNOH with the title "Honorary Conductor for Life."

Zheng is an educator who works to help the public understand and appreciate the orchestra. She also teaches audiences about concert etiquette.

She is the mother of Zheng Su, who is one of the few ethnomusicologists from China teaching in America, and she is a grandmother to Aimee Zheng.
