= Glinka State Prize of the RSFSR =

Former Soviet award for musicians

The Glinka State Prize of the RSFSR (Государственная премия РСФСР имени М.И. Глинки) was a prize awarded to musicians of the Russian Soviet Federative Socialist Republic from 1965–1991. The prize was named in honour of Russian composer Mikhail Glinka.

== Partial list of recipients ==
- 1965 Valery Gavrilin (composer)
- 1966 Lev Oborin (pianist)
- 1968 Borodin Quartet (string quartet): inc. Dmitri Shebalin (viola)
- 1974 Dmitri Shostakovich
- 1979 Tikhon Khrennikov (composer)
- 1979 Vladislav Sokolov (choral conductor)
- 1981 Alexander Voroshilo (baritone)
- 1981 Viktor Tretiakov (violin)
- 1987 Shostakovich Quartet inc. Aleksandr Galkovsky (viola), Alexander Korchagin (cello)
- 1991 Dmitri Hvorostovsky (baritone), Ekaterina Maximova and Vladimir Vasiliev (ballet dancers)
