= Julius Asal =

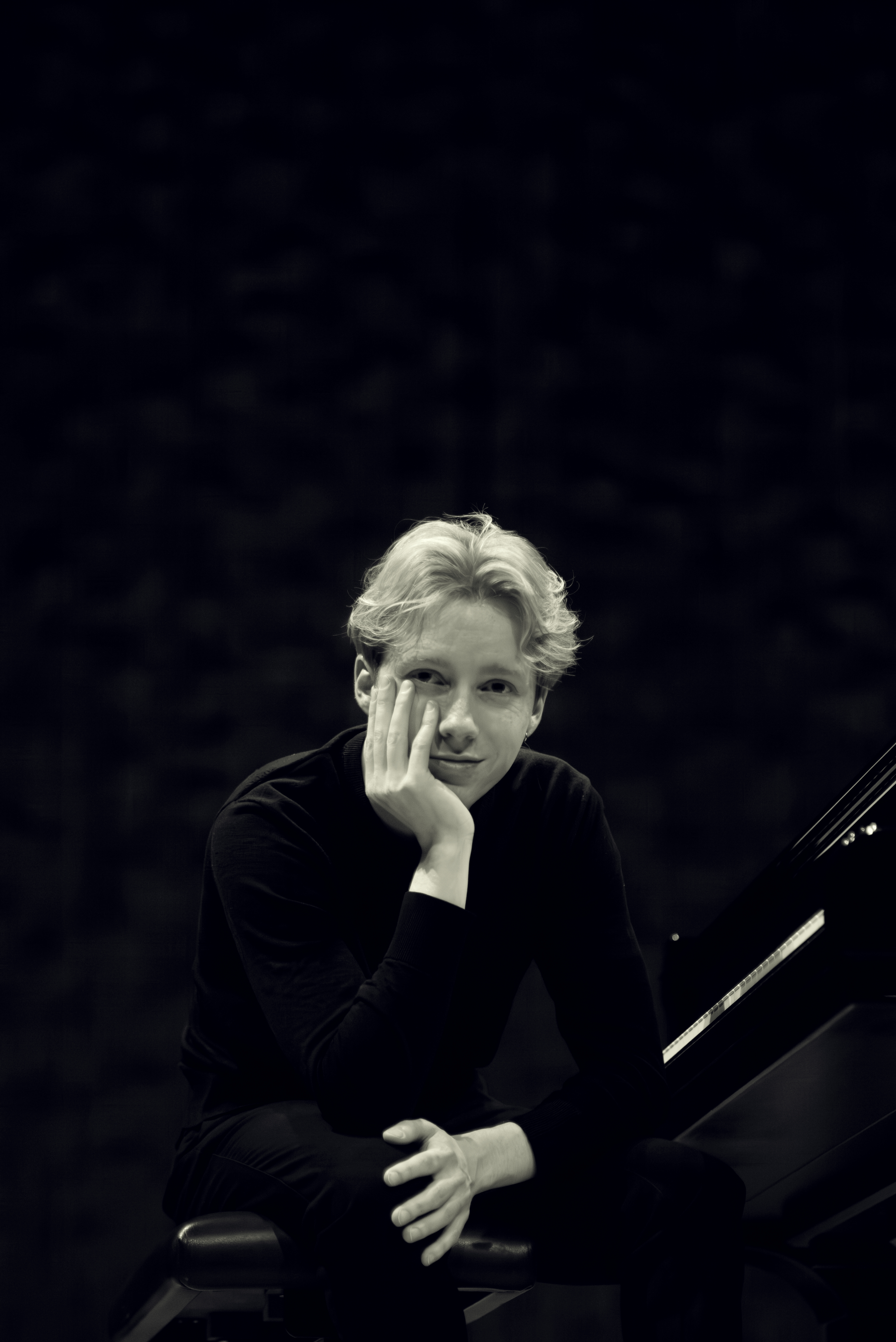

Background information
- Born: Julius Friedrich Asal; 12 February 1997 (age 29); Bad Homburg vor der Höhe, Germany
- Genre: Classical
- Occupation: Pianist
- Instrument: Piano
- Years active: 2006–present
- Labels: Deutsche Grammophon, IBS Classical
- Website: julius-asal.com

Julius Friedrich Asal (born 12 February 1997) is a German classical pianist. He signed an exclusive recording contract with Deutsche Grammophon in 2023 and was named a BBC New Generation Artist for 2024–26.

He studied at the Hochschule für Musik Hanns Eisler Berlin with Eldar Nebolsin and at the Kronberg Academy with András Schiff from 2021 to 2024. His debut album featuring works by Prokofiev was released in 2022, followed by his Deutsche Grammophon debut pairing Scriabin and Scarlatti in 2024. In 2025, Deutsche Grammophon released his second album for the label, Siena Tapes, which combines piano works by Maurice Ravel with original pieces by Asal; it was recorded in 2024 in a chapel on the estate of American record producer Rick Rubin in Tuscany near Siena. His recordings and concert programs feature unexpected pairings between composers, while improvisation remains central to his artistic practice.

In 2025, Asal was awarded the Terence Judd-Hallé Award and became the inaugural Academy of St Martin in the Fields BBC New Generation Associate. He has performed at venues including Wigmore Hall, the Vienna Musikverein, and the Elbphilharmonie Hamburg.

== Early life and education ==
Asal was born on 12 February 1997 in Bad Homburg vor der Höhe, Germany, and grew up in Oberursel in the Taunus mountains near Frankfurt. He grew up in a musical family. His mother is a pianist and his father was solo clarinetist at Frankfurt Opera. He is the grandson of German-British Schlager singer Cindy Ellis. Asal began improvising at the piano at age three, before formal instruction, teaching himself by ear. He began formal piano lessons at age eight in 2005 with Sibylle Cada in Frankfurt am Main.

Asal studied at the Dr. Hoch's Konservatorium in Frankfurt from 2007 to 2013 under Wolfgang Hess. He was a junior student (Jungstudent) at the Hochschule für Musik und Darstellende Kunst Frankfurt from 2013 with Oliver Kern. In 2015, he completed his Abitur in German and French. In 2017, Asal moved to Berlin to study at the Hochschule für Musik Hanns Eisler Berlin with Eldar Nebolsin, remaining there until 2022.

From 2021 to 2024, Asal studied in the Sir András Schiff Performance Programme for Young Pianists at Kronberg Academy. He first met Schiff in 2018 for chamber music coaching and began formal studies with him in 2021. During his studies, Asal also worked with pianists including Alfred Brendel, Richard Goode, Menahem Pressler, Kirill Gerstein, and Boris Berezovsky.

== Career ==
=== Performance career ===
As his career developed, Asal appeared as soloist with orchestras including the BBC Symphony Orchestra, BBC Concert Orchestra, Hallé Orchestra, Munich Symphonic, and the Academy of St Martin in the Fields. He has worked with conductors including Duncan Ward, Andrey Boreyko, Fabio Luisi, Elena Schwarz, Michael Seal, Edwin Outwater, and Dmitri Jurowski. Notable performances include stepping in for Evgeny Kissin in Bologna at the Teatro Manzoni with the Orchestra del Teatro Bologna under Andrey Boreyko's direction, and concerts with Gidon Kremer and the Kremerata Baltica.

His international profile grew through performances at major venues including Wigmore Hall in London, the Wiener Musikverein, Suntory Hall in Tokyo, the Elbphilharmonie Hamburg, Tivoli Concert Hall in Utrecht, Alte Oper Frankfurt, Metropolitan Theatre Tokyo, Bridgewater Hall in Manchester, Seoul Arts Center, Vancouver Playhouse, and Isar Philharmonie Munich. He has appeared at festivals including the Klavier-Festival Ruhr, Rheingau Musik Festival, the Festspiele Mecklenburg-Vorpommern, Piano aux Jacobins in Toulouse, and the Aldeburgh Festival.

Asal has created narrative concert programs combining music with literature and has presented educational lectures on improvisation.

=== Recording career ===
Asal's debut album, released in April 2022 on IBS Classical, featured works by Prokofiev including the Four Pieces Op. 4, Pensées Op. 62, and six pieces from Romeo and Juliet in Asal's own arrangement. The album was named "Album of the Week" by rbbKultur and Klassik Heute, and "Album of the Month" by Stereoplay magazine in July 2022. It was awarded the Melómano de Oro by Melómano Magazine and received a nomination for the Preis der deutschen Schallplattenkritik.

In October 2023, Asal signed an exclusive recording contract with Deutsche Grammophon. His debut album for the label, Scriabin · Scarlatti, was released in May 2024. The album pairs Scriabin's Piano Sonata No. 1 in F minor with selected preludes and études alongside six keyboard sonatas by Domenico Scarlatti, connected by Asal's own improvisational transitions. International Piano critic Bryce Morrison wrote that "the combination of composers, two centuries apart and radically different, amounts to more than mere novelty" and praised how "his performances alternate strength and delicacy, from Scarlatti's range and audacity to Scriabin's manic depression."

=== BBC New Generation Artist (2024–2026) ===
As a BBC New Generation Artist (2024–2026), in March 2025 Asal became the inaugural Academy of St Martin in the Fields BBC New Generation Associate.

On 3 March 2025, Asal was awarded the Terence Judd-Hallé Award, announced on the 25th anniversary of the BBC Radio 3 New Generation Artists Scheme. The prize includes £7,000, a solo performance with the Hallé orchestra at Bridgewater Hall during the 2025–26 season, a chamber recital with Hallé musicians, and a solo recital in the Manchester Mid-Day Concert Series. The award was established in 1982 to honor pianist Terence Judd (1957–1979); past recipients include Stephen Hough and Nikolai Lugansky.

== Recordings ==
=== Studio albums ===
- Prokofiev: Piano Works (2022, IBS Classical)
- Scriabin · Scarlatti (2024, Deutsche Grammophon)
- Siena Tapes – works by Ravel, Asal, and Badzura (2025, Deutsche Grammophon)
- Scriabin: Orchestral Works with Danish National Symphony Orchestra, conducted by Fabio Luisi (2025, Deutsche Grammophon)

== Critical reception ==
Reviewing the Scriabin · Scarlatti album for International Piano, Bryce Morrison assessed the album's conceptual framework as succeeding "primarily because of Asal's committed musicianship," noting that his performances "alternate strength and delicacy, from Scarlatti's range and audacity to Scriabin's manic depression." Stephen Greenbank of MusicWeb International called it "a remarkably assured debut album, imaginatively constructed, probing and a tribute to sensitivity and outstanding musicianship," praising Asal's "sensitive" playing that "is responsive to the range and narrative of the music and is imbued with a vast palette of colourful sonorities."

Le Monde praised the "enchanting uniqueness" of his interpretations and his approach to creating "secret and subtle alliances" in program selection. German publication Klassik Heute highlighted the "elemental energies" he brings to his playing and his "phenomenal gift for subtle mood changes." Frankfurter Allgemeine Zeitung described him as a "piano genius" who "looks like a pop star," praising his unique approach of treating "the old works like pop or jazz: as something that lives, that one may continue to tell." The Telegraph included Asal among "The 10 most exciting young musicians in the world," noting "there's a fierceness in him which belies the elfin blonde looks." Pianist Menahem Pressler stated that "Julius Asal's piano playing immediately left me in awe. The instrument seemed to whisper a secret to him," describing Asal as having a "uniquely beautiful sound and special sonority."

== Artistic approach ==
Asal views improvisation as "an approach to performing on stage" and foundational to his musical interpretation. He has stated that while improvising, "to explore the score and be close to what the composer wanted is essential," describing his performance practice as "a tightrope walk" between tradition and innovation while respecting composers' intentions.

Beyond his performance practice, Asal has expressed views on artistic authenticity in competition settings, stating "I would love to focus on what I really want to do, without having to take care of the right repertoire." For his Scriabin · Scarlatti project, he explained that "the central idea was to record the first Scriabin sonata, which I have always loved...I've never understood why so few pianists perform or record it."

This creative approach extends to his work as a transcriber and editor. Asal creates his own transcriptions, including an arrangement of six pieces from Prokofiev's Romeo and Juliet for solo piano, created in 2020. In 2026, he contributed fingerings to the first Urtext edition of Prokofiev's "Ten Pieces from Romeo and Juliet" Op. 75 for solo piano, published by Henle Verlag and edited by Fabian Czolbe.

== Awards and honors ==
Major international recognition:

- 2015: Steinway Prize
- 2017: Young Concert Artists European Auditions – First Prize
- 2018: International Johannes Brahms Competition – Second Prize (with Arcon Trio)
- 2019: Palma d'Oro International Piano Competition – Silver Medal
- 2022: Melómano de Oro (for Prokofiev: Piano Works)
- 2022: Preis der deutschen Schallplattenkritik nomination (for Prokofiev: Piano Works)
- 2024: Classic FM Rising Star (30 under 30)
- 2024–26: BBC New Generation Artist
- 2025: Academy of St Martin in the Fields BBC New Generation Associate (inaugural recipient)
- 2025: Terence Judd-Hallé Award
