= Maxim Fedotov =

Russian violinist and conductor (born 1961)

- Born: 24 July 1961; Leningrad
- Citizenship: Russian
- Occupations: Violinist; Conductor; Music teacher
- Partner: Galina Petrova

Maxim Viktorovich Fedotov (Russian: Максим Викторович Федотов; born 24 July 1961) is a Russian violinist and conductor, People's Artist of Russia, son of the conductor Viktor Fedotov.

Fedotov studied at the Special Music School in Leningrad and then at the Moscow Conservatory. As well as his career as a soloist, he has also been chief conductor of the Russian Symphony Orchestra (2003–2005), artistic director and chief conductor of the Moscow City Symphony Orchestra – Russian Philharmonic Orchestra from 2006 until December 2010, professor of the Moscow Conservatory since 1987, and professor and head of Department of Violin and Viola of the Gnessin-Academia of Music from 2003 until 2008.

He is believed to be the first person since Paganini himself to give a recital on both the violins belonging to Paganini, one a Guarneri, the other a Vuillaume (in Saint Petersburg in 2003).

== Awards ==
- 1982: Paganini Competition (Genoa)
- 1984: Viotti International Music Competition – chamber music (Vercelli)
- 1986: First Prize, the Gold Medal, and all special prizes in the III International Violin Competition (Tokyo)
- 1986: Second Prize in the International Tchaikovsky Competition (Moscow)
