= Viktor Tretiakov =

Russian violinist (born 1946)

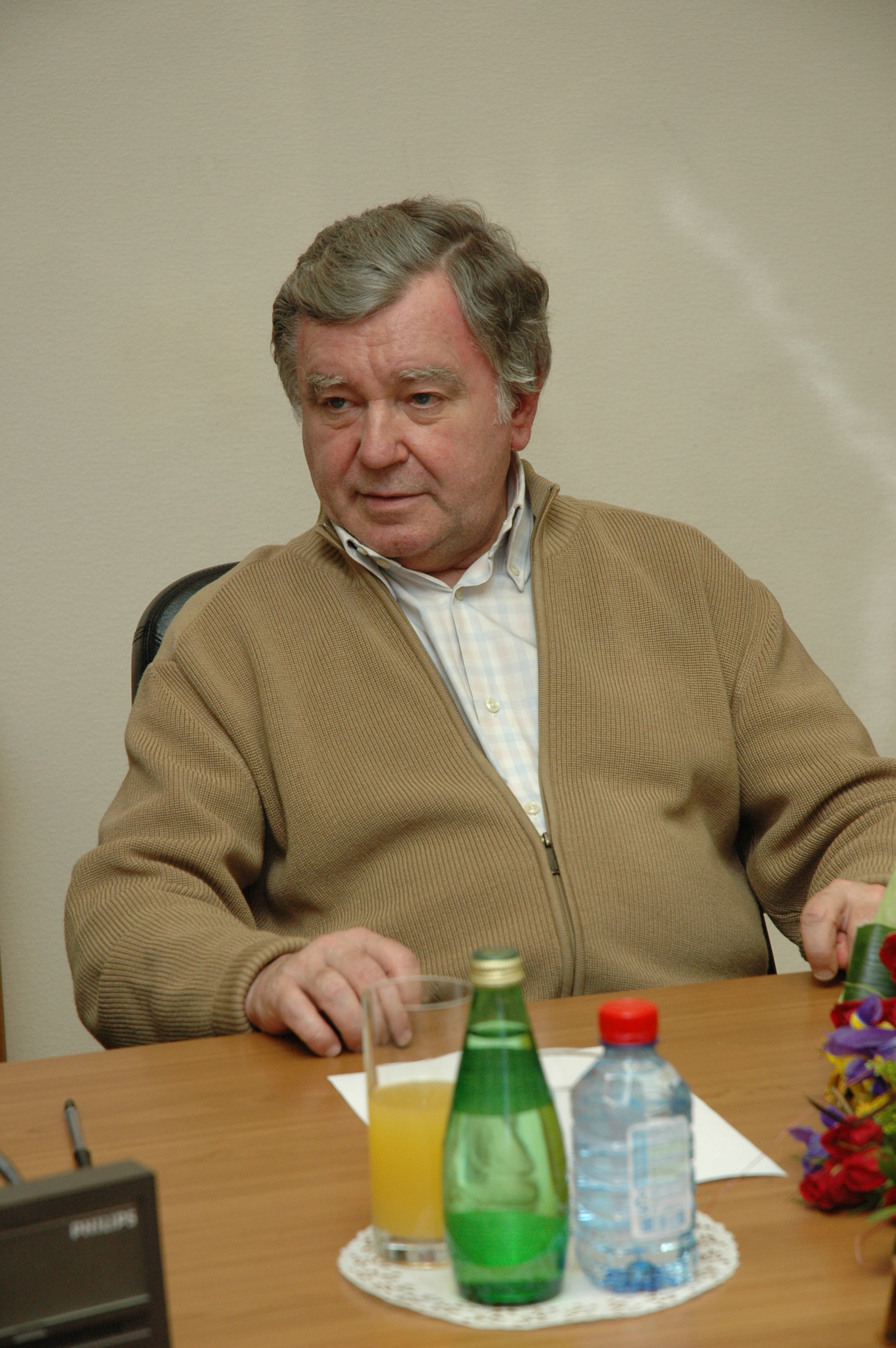
Tretiakov in 2008

Viktor Viktorovich Tretiakov (Russian: Ви́ктор Ви́кторович Третьяко́в; born 17 October 1946) is a Russian violinist and conductor. Other spellings of his name are Victor, Tretyakov and Tretjakov.

== Biography ==
The son of a musician who played in the military band in Siberian city of Krasnoyarsk, he showed an extraordinary musical talent very early, and started to play violin at the age of seven. He came to Moscow in 1954 and first studied in the junior division of the Moscow Conservatory Music College, and in 1956 entered Yuri Yankelevich's class at the Moscow Central Music School, later studying with him in the Moscow Conservatoire.

In 1966, at age 19, he won first prize in the Third International Tchaikovsky Competition and was invited to appear on several international concert tours—something that had become much easier after the pioneering visits outside the Soviet Union by artists such as Sviatoslav Richter, Emil Gilels, Mstislav Rostropovich and David Oistrakh. The influence of the last could be noticed in Tretyakov's interpretations and also in his choice of the repertoire; Tretyakov favored the great romantic violin concertos such as those by Brahms, Mendelssohn, Tchaikovsky, Sibelius and music of Prokofiev and Shostakovich. His unique style is supported by impeccable technique and profound musical insight with expressively articulate phrasing.

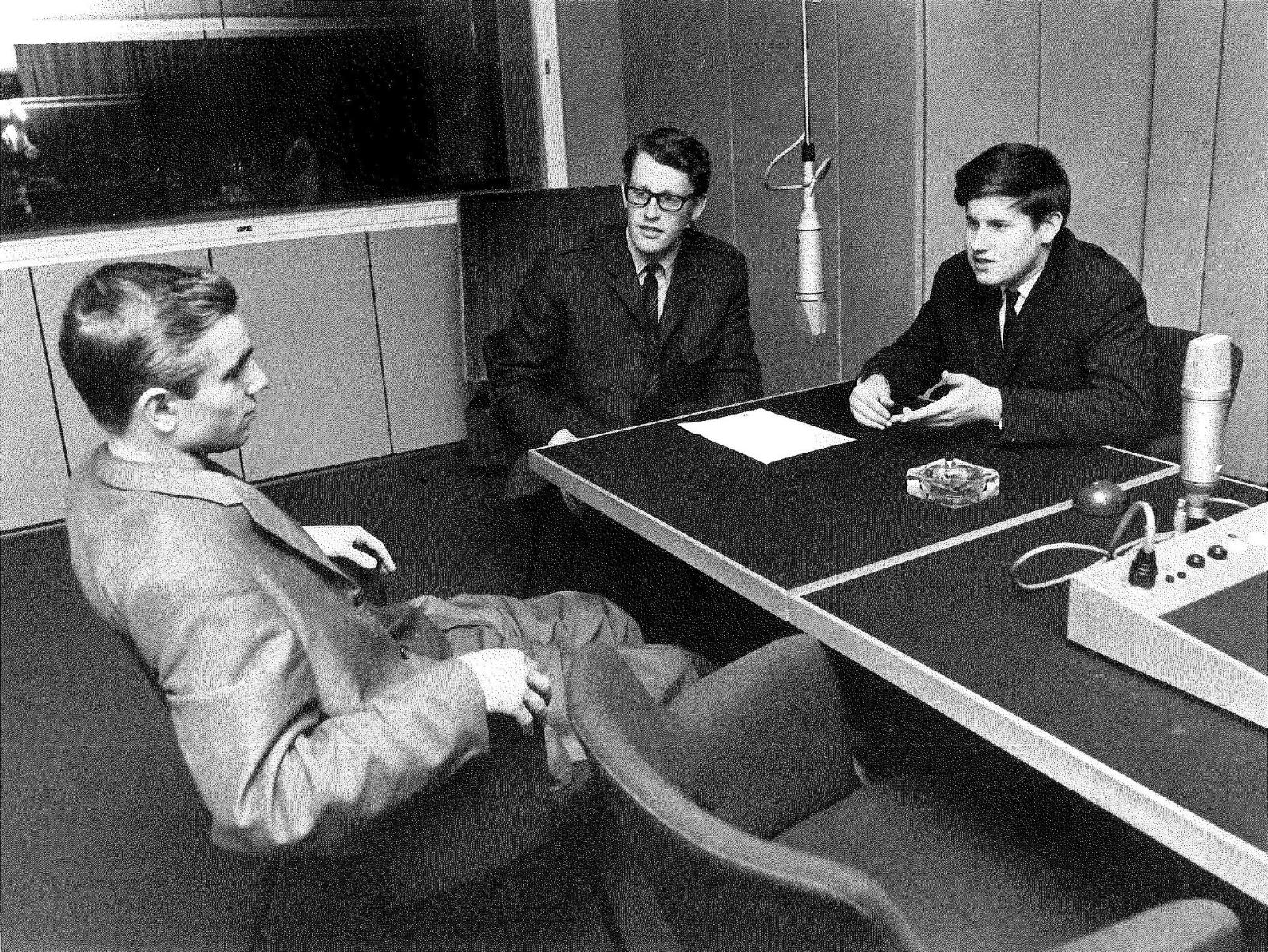
Viktor Tretiakov, the Finnish music journalist Hannu Heikinheimo, and the Russian pianist Grigory Sokolov in 1967.

Named a People's Artist of the USSR in 1987, Tretyakov was granted the Russian Prize for the encouragement of achievements in art and literature known as "Triumph". He is laureate of the Shostakovich Prize, awarded by the Yuri Bashmet International Charitable Foundation, and the Glinka State Prize of the RSFSR (1981) (other recipients include the Borodin Quartet and composer Valery Gavrilin). In 2001, he was awarded the Order of Service to the Fatherland by President Vladimir Putin.

== Performing ==
Since winning the International Tchaikovsky Competition in 1966, Tretyakov has performed with almost every major orchestra in the world, including the Berlin, Vienna, Moscow, St. Petersburg, London, Los Angeles and Munich Philharmonic Orchestras, the London Symphony Orchestra, the Philharmonia Orchestra of London, the Royal Philharmonic, the Orchestre de Paris, the Dresden Staatskapelle, the Bamberg SO, the NDR Hamburg, the WDR Cologne, the NHK Symphony, the Kirov Orchestra, the Amsterdam Concertgebouw Orchestra, the Bavarian Radio Symphony Orchestra, the Vienna Symphony, the symphony orchestras of Chicago, Philadelphia, Cleveland, Atlanta, Detroit, San Francisco, Dallas, Pittsburgh, Toronto, and many others. He has worked with conductors including Rostropovich, Ormandy, Temirkanov, Alekseev, Jochum, Krips, Gergiev, Fedoseyev, Maazel, Kempe, Jansons, Järvi, Levine, Mehta, von Dohnanyi, Penderecki, Previn, and Kondrashin. He plays a 1772 Nicolo Gagliano violin.

== Teaching ==
For many years, Tretyakov has taught at the Moscow State Conservatory. In 1996, he also began to teach in Cologne, Germany. From 1986 to 1994, he was the jury president of the International Tchaikovsky Competition. Additionally, he has served as a jury member of competitions in Brussels, Hanover, Sendai, Moscow, Helsinki, Zagreb and many others. Notable students of his include Roman Kim, Ilya Kaler, Natalia Likhopoi, Dmitri Berlinsky, Evgeny Bushkov, Sergei Stadler and Daniel Austrich.

== Chamber music ==
An active chamber musician, Tretyakov has performed together with Mstislav Rostropovich, Sviatoslav Richter, the Borodin Quartet, Oleg Kagan, David Geringas, Evgeny Kissin and Elisabeth Leonskaja. Together with Vassily Lobanov, Yuri Bashmet and Natalia Gutman, he has formed a piano quartet which performs regularly, including in concerts in Moscow, Berlin, Munich, Istanbul, Paris, Athens, Lisbon and Copenhagen.

== Awards and titles ==
Tretyakov has received many honours and awards, including:

- Honored Artist of the RSFSR (December 27, 1973) - for services in the field of Soviet musical art.
- People's Artist of the RSFSR (January 26, 1979) - for services in the field of Soviet musical art.
- People's Artist of the USSR (August 19, 1987) - for great services in the development of Soviet musical art.
- Lenin Komsomol Prize (1967) – for concert and performance activities and high skill demonstrated at international competitions .
- State Prize of the RSFSR named after M. I. Glinka (1981) - for concert programs (1978-1980)
- Prize of the President of the Russian Federation in the field of literature and art 2000 (April 25, 2001).
- Order "For Merit to the Fatherland", 3rd class (October 3, 2006) - for a major contribution to the development of musical art and many years of creative activity.
- Order "For Merit to the Fatherland", 4th class (September 12, 1996) - for services to the state, a great contribution to strengthening friendship and cooperation between peoples, and many years of fruitful work in the field of culture and art.
- Order of Friendship of Peoples (November 14, 1980) - for extensive work in preparing and holding the Games of the XXII Olympiad.
- Gratitude from the President of the Russian Federation (April 12, 2002) - for a great contribution to the development of musical art.
- Honorary Citizen of the Krasnoyarsk Territory (November 9, 2021) - for outstanding personal achievements in the field of art, contributing to the enhancement of the authority and prestige of the Krasnoyarsk Territory.
- 1st prize (shared with Z. Vinnikov ) at the All-Union Competition of Musicians-Performers (1965, Moscow ).
- 1st prize at the Third International Tchaikovsky Competition (1966).
- D. Shostakovich Prize (from the Yury Bashmet Charitable Foundation, 1997).
- "Triumph" Award (2002).
- Honorary Citizen of Krasnoyarsk (1983).

== Bibliography ==
- Samuel Applebaum-Henry Roth, The Way They Play, vol. 5, Neptune City, New Jersey, Paganiniana, 1978, pp. 45-79
- Boris Schwarz, Younger Soviet Violinists [Viktor Tretyakov], in Great Masters of the Violin: From Corelli and Vivaldi to Stern, Zukerman and Perlman, London, Robert Hale, 1983, pp. 473-474
- - voce Tretjakov Viktor Viktorovič, in Dizionario degli interpreti musicali, Milano, Tea, 1993, p. 560
- Henry Roth, Viktor Tretyakov, in Violin Virtuosos, From Paganini to the 21st Century, California Classics Books, Los Angeles 1997, p. 300
- Jean-Michel Molkhou, Viktor Tretyakov, in Les grands violonistes du XXe siècle, Tome I – de Kreisler à Kremer 1985-1947, Paris, Buchet-Chastel, 2011, pp. 309-311
