= Oleksandr Bondurianskyi =

Ukrainian pianist (born 1945)

Oleksandr Bondurianskyi Олександр Бондурянський
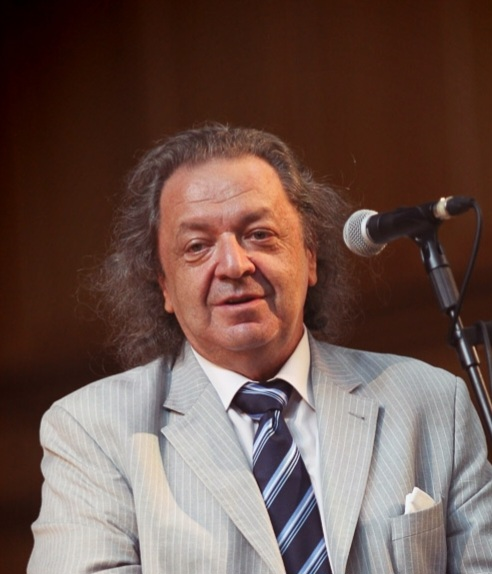
- Bondurianskyi in 2011

Background information
- Born: 1945 (age 80–81); Kherson, Ukrainian SSR, Soviet Union
- Genres: Classical
- Occupation: Pianist
- Instrument: Piano

Oleksandr Zeilikovych Bondurianskyi (Note: Ukrainian: Олександр Зейлікович Бондурянський, romanized: Oleksandr Zeilikovych Bondurianskyi; patronymic sometimes given as Ukrainian: Зіновійович, romanized: Zinoviiovych) (born 1945) is a Ukrainian pianist and 1994 recipient of the People's Artist of Russia. who was born in Kherson, Ukrainian Soviet Socialist Republic and used to take music lessons from Alexander Sokovnin at the Academy of Music, Theatre and Fine Arts of Moldova in Chișinău. Later on, he moved to Moscow where he studied piano and chamber music at the Moscow Conservatory under guidance from both Dimitri Bashkirov and Tatiana Gaidamovich. Soon after, he became a member of Moscow Piano Trio and began traveling in Russia and in the rest of the world. He used to be a teacher of both Chișinău and Moscow Conservatories at the later of which he became a professor. Since 1995, as many as 250 students have graduated under his guidance, which later became well known chamber music teachers throughout Russia.
