= Natalia Shakhovskaya =

Soviet and Russian cellist

Natalia Shakhovskaya (September 27, 1935 – May 20, 2017), PAU, was a Soviet and Russian cellist. She studied cello at the Gnessin School of Music (under David Lyubkin and Alexander Fedortchenko) and later at the Moscow Conservatory under the tutorship of Semyon Kozolupov. She finished her education at the aforementioned music conservatory with Mstislav Rostropovich.

Shakovskaya won some of the most important cello competitions in Russia and abroad, including; the First Prize and Gold Medal at the International Tchaikovsky Competition in 1962. Shakhovskaya pursued an active career as a soloist in recitals and with the best orchestras and conductors worldwide.

She taught at the Moscow Conservatory since 1962 (and as Head of the Cello Chair and Director of Double Bass Department from 1974, after Rostropovich relinquished the post upon his departure from Russia).

More than forty of her students have won international competitions, e.g. Truls Mørk. Shakhovskaya gave master classes around the world and was a jury member at international competitions.

She was a principal teacher at the Escuela Superior de Música Reina Sofía (Queen Sofía College of Music) in Madrid.
