= Aleksey Nasedkin =

Russian pianist and composer (1942-2014)

Alexei Nasedkin (Russian: Алексе́й Насе́дкин; 20 December 1942 in Moscow – 4 December 2014 in Moscow) was a Russian pianist and composer.

Nasedkin showed a talent for music at a young age, composing an opera at age 7, The Tale of the Fisherman and the Fish (Сказке о рыбаке и рыбке), and performing in public at age 9. He attended the Central Music School in Moscow from 1949 to 1961, where his teachers included Anna Artobolevskaya. From 1961 to 1966, he studied at the Moscow Conservatory, where his piano teachers included Heinrich Neuhaus and Lev Naumov. He was also a composition student of Sergei Balasanyan at the conservatory. He was a sixth-prize winner at the 1962 International Tchaikovsky Competition, and a third-prize winner at the 1966 Leeds Piano Competition.

A recipient of the People's Artist of the Russian Federation title, Nasedkin was the president of Russia's Schubert Society. He was a member of the Composers' Union of the USSR/RF and a professor at Moscow's Conservatory, where he taught from 1966.

Record of piano prizes, incomplete
Year	Competition	Prize	Ex-aequo with...	1st prize winner
1962	(Soviet Union) II Piotr Ilych Tchaikovsky, Moscow	6th prize	(France) Christian Biyo	(Soviet Union) Vladimir Ashkenazy + (United Kingdom) John Ogdon
1966	(United Kingdom) II Leeds competition	3rd prize		(Spain) Rafael Orozco
1967	(Austria) Schubert und die Musik der Moderne, Vienna	1st prize		
