= Grammy Award for Best Instrumental Soloist(s) Performance (with orchestra) =

Music award category

The Grammy Award for Best Instrumental Soloist(s) Performance (with orchestra) was awarded from 1959 to 2011. From 1967 to 1971, and in 1987, the award was combined with the award for Best Instrumental Soloist Performance (without orchestra) and awarded as the Grammy Award for Best Classical Performance – Instrumental Soloist or Soloists (with or without orchestra).

The award has had several minor name changes:

- In 1959 the award was known as Best Classical Performance – Instrumentalist (with concerto scale accompaniment)
- In 1960 it was awarded as Best Classical Performance – Concerto or Instrumental Soloist (with full orchestral accompaniment)
- In 1961 it was awarded as Best Classical Performance – Concerto or Instrumental Soloist
- In 1962 it was awarded as Best Classical Performance – Instrumental Soloist (with orchestra)
- From 1963 to 1964 it was awarded as Best Classical Performance – Instrumental Soloist or Soloists (with orchestra)
- In 1965 it was awarded as Best Performance – Instrumental Soloist or Soloists (with orchestra)
- From 1966 to 1991 and in 1994 it was awarded as Best Classical Performance – Instrumental Soloist or Soloists (with orchestra) (or a very similar equivalent)
- In 1992 it was awarded as Best Instrumental Soloist With Orchestra
- In 1993 it was awarded as Best Classical Performance – Instrumental Solo With Orchestra
- From 1995 to 2011 it was awarded as Best Instrumental Soloist(s) Performance (with orchestra)

In 2012, the award was discontinued in a major overhaul of Grammy categories. The category was merged with the Best Instrumental Soloist Performance (without orchestra) category to form the new Best Classical Instrumental Solo category, similar to the award from 1967 to 1971.

Years reflect the year in which the Grammy Awards were presented, for works released in the previous year.

== Winners & Nominees ==
=== 1950s ===
Year	Recording	Artist(s)
1959
1959	Tchaikovsky: Piano Concerto No. 1 in B Flat Minor, Op. 23	Van Cliburn, soloist; Symphony of the Air; Kiril Kondrashin, conductor
1959	Bartók: Concerto for Violin	Isaac Stern, soloist; New York Philharmonic; Leonard Bernstein, conductor
1959	Brahms: Piano Concerto No. 2 in B Flat Major, Op. 83	Emil Gilels, soloist; Chicago Symphony Orchestra; Fritz Reiner, conductor
1959	Rachmaninoff: Rhapsody on a Theme of Paganini	Leonard Pennario, soloist; Los Angeles Philharmonic; Erich Leinsdorf, conductor
1959	Segovia Golden Jubilee	Andrés Segovia, soloist; Symphony of the Air; Enrique Jordá, conductor

=== 1960s ===
Year	Recording	Artist(s)
1960
1960	Rachmaninoff: Piano Concerto No. 3 in D Minor, Op. 30	Van Cliburn, soloist; Symphony of the Air; Kiril Kondrashin, conductor
1960	Brahms: Piano Concerto No. 2 in B Flat Minor, Op. 83	Arthur Rubinstein, soloist; RCA Victor Symphony Orchestra; Josef Krips, conductor
1960	Brahms: Violin Concerto in D Major, Op. 77	Henryk Szeryng, soloist; London Symphony Orchestra; Pierre Monteux, conductor
1960	Tchaikovsky: Piano Concerto No. 1 in B Flat Minor, Op. 23	Vladimir Horowitz, soloist; NBC Symphony Orchestra; Arturo Toscanini, conductor
1961
1961	Brahms: Piano Concerto No. 2 in B Flat Minor, Op. 83	Sviatoslav Richter, soloist; Chicago Symphony Orchestra; Erich Leinsdorf, conductor
1961	Bach: Concerto No. 5 in F Minor, BWV 1056	Glenn Gould, soloist; Columbia Symphony Orchestra; Vladimir Golschmann, conductor
1961	Mozart: Clarinet Concerto in A Major, K. 662	Gervase de Peyer, soloist; London Symphony Orchestra; Peter Maag, conductor
1961	Prokofiev: Piano Concerto No. 2 in G Minor, Op. 16	Malcolm Frager, soloist; Paris Conservatoire Orchestra; René Leibowitz, conductor
1961	Schumann: Piano Concerto in A Minor, Op. 54	Van Cliburn, soloist; Chicago Symphony Orchestra; Fritz Reiner, conductor
1962
1962	Bartók: Violin Concerto No. 1, Sz. 36 BB 48a	Isaac Stern, soloist; Philadelphia Orchestra; Eugene Ormandy, conductor
1962	Beethoven: Piano Concerto No. 5 in E Flat Major, Op. 73	Leon Fleisher, soloist; Cleveland Orchestra; George Szell, conductor
1962	Boccherini-Cassado: Concerto for Guitar	Andrés Segovia, soloist; Symphony of the Air; Enrique Jordá, conductor
1962	Strauss: Don Quixote, Op. 35	Pierre Fournier, soloist; Cleveland Orchestra; George Szell, conductor
1963
1963	Stravinsky: Violin Concert in D	Isaac Stern, soloist; Columbia Symphony Orchestra; Igor Stravinsky, conductor
1963	Brahms: Violin Concerto in D Major, Op. 77	David Oistrakh, soloist; Orchestre National de France; Otto Klemperer, conductor
1963	Bruch: Scottish Fantasy in E Flat Major, Op. 46, Vieuxtemps: Violin Concerto No. 5 in A Minor, Op. 37	Jascha Heifetz, soloist; New London Symphony Orchestra; Malcolm Sargent, conductor
1963	Liszt: Piano Concertos No. 1 and No. 2	Sviatoslav Richter, soloist; London Symphony Orchestra; Kiril Kondrashin, conductor
1963	Rachmaninoff: Piano Concerto No. 2 in C Minor, Op. 18	Van Cliburn, soloist; Chicago Symphony Orchestra; Fritz Reiner, conductor
1964
1964	Tchaikovsky: Piano Concerto No. 1 in B Flat Minor, Op. 23	Arthur Rubinstein, soloist; Boston Symphony Orchestra; Erich Leinsdorf, conductor
1964	Bartók: Piano Concerto No. 1, Sz. 83 BB 91	Rudolf Serkin, soloist; Columbia Symphony Orchestra; George Szell, conductor
1964	Bruch: Violin Concerto No. 1 in G Minor, Op. 26, MOzart: Violin Concerto No. 4 in D Major, K. 218	Jascha Heifetz, soloist; New London Symphony Orchestra; Malcolm Sargent, conductor
1964	Rachmaninoff: Piano Concerto No. 3 in D Minor, Op. 30	Vladimir Ashkenazy, soloist; London Symphony Orchestra; Anatole Fistoulari, conductor
1964	Ravel: Piano Concerto in G Major, M. 83	Lorin Hollander, soloist; Boston Symphony Orchestra; Erich Leinsdorf, conductor
1965
1965	Prokofiev: Violin Concerto No. 1 in D Major, Op. 19	Isaac Stern, soloist; Philadelphia Orchestra; Erich Leinsdorf, conductor
1965	Barber: Piano Concerto, Op. 38	John Browning, soloist; Cleveland Orchestra; George Szell, conductor
1965	Beethoven: Piano Concerto No. 5 in E Flat Major, Op. 73	Arthur Rubinstein, soloist; Boston Symphony Orchestra; Erich Leinsdorf, conductor
1965	Bloch: Concerto for Violin	Yehudi Menuhin, soloist; Philharmonia Orchestra; Paul Kletzki, conductor
1965	Brahms: Piano Concerto No. 1 in D Minor, Op. 15	Van Cliburn, soloist; Boston Symphony Orchestra; Erich Leinsdorf, conductor
1965	Mozart: Sinfonia Concertante for Violin, Viola and Orchestra in E Flat Major, K. 364	Rafael Druian, Abraham Skernik, soloists; Boston Symphony Orchestra; George Szell, conductor
1965	Rodrigo: Concierto de Aranjuez, Vivaldi: Lute Concerto in D Major, RV 93	Julian Bream, soloist; Melos Chamber Orchestra; Davis, conductor
1966
1966	Beethoven: Piano Concerto No. 4 in G Major, Op. 58	Arthur Rubinstein, soloist; Boston Symphony Orchestra; Erich Leinsdorf, conductor
1966	Barber: Violin Concerto, Op. 14, Hindemith: Concerto for Violin and Orchestra	Isaac Stern, soloist; New York Philharmonic; Leonard Bernstein, conductor
1966	Beethoven: Piano Concerto No. 4 in G Major, Op. 58	Rudolf Serkin, soloist; NBC Symphony Orchestra; Arturo Toscanini, conductor
1966	Beethoven: Triple Concerto	Isaac Stern, Leonard Rose, Eugene Istomin, soloists; Royal Philharmonic Orchestra; Eugene Ormandy, conductor
1966	Rachmaninoff: Piano Concerto No. 1 in F Sharp Minor, Op. 1, Piano Concerto No. 4 in G Minor, Op. 40	Leonard Pennario, soloist; Royal Philharmonic Orchestra; André Previn, conductor

=== 1970s ===
Year	Recording	Artist(s)
1972
1972	Villa-Lobos: Concerto for Guitar	Julian Bream, soloist; London Symphony Orchestra; André Previn, conductor
1972	Bach: Complete Concertos for Harpsichord	Igor Kipnis, soloist; London Strings; Neville Marriner, conductor
1972	Beethoven: Triple Concerto	David Oistrakh, Mstislav Rostropovich, Sviatoslav Richter soloists; Berlin Philharmonic; Herbert von Karajan, conductor
1972	Berg: Violin Concerto	Henryk Szeryng, soloist; Bavarian Radio Symphony Orchestra; Rafael Kubelík, conductor
1972	Dvořak: Cello Concerto in B Minor, Op. 104, B. 191	Jacqueline Du Pre, soloist; Chicago Symphony Orchestra; Daniel Barenboim, conductor
1972	Rachmaninoff: Rhapsody on a Theme of Paganini, Liszt: Piano Concerto No. 2 in A Major, S.125	Van Cliburn, soloist; Philadelphia Orchestra; Eugene Ormandy, conductor
1972	Sibelius: Violin Concerto in D Minor, Op. 47	Kyung Wha Chung, soloist; London Symphony Orchestra; André Previn, conductor
1973
1973	Brahms: Piano Concerto No. 2 in B Flat Minor, Op. 83	Arthur Rubinstein, soloist; Philadelphia Orchestra; Eugene Ormandy, conductor
1973	Mozart: Complete Works for Violin	David Oistrakh, soloist; Berlin Philharmonic
1973	Mozart: Horn Concertos	Barry Tuckwell, soloist; Academy of St Martin in the Fields; Neville Marriner, conductor
1973	Music for Organ, Brass and Percussion	E. Power Biggs, soloists; Columbia Brass Percussion Ensemble; Maurice Peress, conductor
1973	Ravel: Piano Concerto for the Left Hand in D Major	Philippe Entremont, soloist; Cleveland Orchestra; Pierre Boulez, conductor
1973	Strauss: Concerto in D Major for Oboe and Small Orchestra, AV 144, TrV 292	Heinz Holliger, soloist; Philharmonia Orchestra; Edo de Waart, conductor
1974
1974	Beethoven: Piano Concerto No. 5 in E Flat Major, Op. 73	Vladimir Ashkenazi, soloist; Chicago Symphony Orchestra; Georg Solti, conductor
1974	Brahms: Piano Concerto No. 1 in D Minor, Op. 15, Piano Concerto No. 2 in B Flat Minor, Op. 83	Emil Gilels, soloist; Berlin Philharmonic; Eugen Jochum, conductor
1974	Mozart: Piano Concerto No. 21 in C Major, K. 467, Piano Concerto in C Major, Op. 504	Stephen Bishop, soloist; London Symphony Orchestra; Andrew Davis, conductor
1974	Previn: Concerto for Guitar and Orchestra, Ponce: Coincierto del Sur for Guitar and Orchestra	John Williams, soloist; London Symphony Orchestra; André Previn, conductor
1974	Rachmaninoff: Piano Concerto No. 2 in C Minor, Op. 18	Arthur Rubinstein, soloist; Philadelphia Orchestra; Eugene Ormandy, conductor
1974	Saint-Saëns: Complete Concertos for Piano	Aldo Ciccolini, soloist; Orchestre de Paris; Serge Baudo, conductor
1974	Vivaldi: The Four Seasons	Pinchas Zukerman, soloist; English Chamber Orchestra; Pinchas Zukerman, conductor
1975
1975	Shostakovich: Violin Concerto No. 1 in A Minor, Op. 77	David Oistrakh, soloist; New Philharmonia; Maxim Shostakovich, conductor
1975	Bartók: Violin Concerto No. 2 BB 117	Itzhak Perlman, soloist; London Symphony Orchestra; André Previn, conductor
1975	Brahms: Piano Concerto No. 2 in B Flat Major, Op. 83	Alfred Brendel, soloist; Concertgebouw Orchestra; Bernard Haitink, conductor
1975	Chopin: Variations on "Là ci darem la mano"	Claudio Arrau, soloist; London Philharmonic; Eliahu Inbal, conductor
1975	Liszt: Totentanz	André Watts, soloist; London Symphony Orchestra; Erich Leinsdorf, conductor
1976
1976	Ravel: Concerto for the Left Hand, Piano Concerto in G Major, M. 83; Fauré: Fantasie for Piano and Orchestra	Alicia de Larrocha, soloist; London Philharmonic Orchestra; Rafael Frühbeck de Burgos, conductor
1976	Berkely: Guitar Concerto, Rodrigo: Concierto de Aranjuez	Julian Bream, soloist; Monteverdi Orchestra; John Eliot Gardiner, conductor
1976	Dvořák: Cello Concerto in B Minor, Op. 104 BB. 191	Lynn Harrell, soloist; London Symphony Orchestra; James Levine, conductor
1976	Mendelssohn: Piano Concerto No. 1 in G Minor, Op. 25, Piano Concerto No. 2 in D Minor, Op. 40	Murray Perahia, soloist; Academy of St Martin in the Fields; Neville Marriner, conductor
1976	Mozart: Concertos for Piano and Orchestra Composed in 1784	Peter Serkin, soloist; English Chamber Orchestra; Peter Schneider, conductor
1976	Vivaldi, Telemann, Mozart, Hummel: Horn Concertos	Maurice André, soloist; Berlin Philharmonic; Herbert von Karajan, conductor
1977
1977	Beethoven: Complete Piano Concertos	Arthur Rubinstein, soloist; London Philharmonic; Daniel Barenboim, conductor
1977	Bartók: Piano Concerto No. 1, Sz. 83, BB 91, Piano Concerto No. 3 in E Major, Sz. 119, BB 127	Stephen Bishop, soloist; London Symphony Orchestra; Colin Davis, conductor
1977	Brahms: Violin Concerto in D Major, Op. 77	Nathan Milstein, soloist; Vienna Philharmonic; Eugen Jochum, conductor
1977	Prokofiev: Complete Piano Concertos	Vladimir Ashkenazy, soloist; London Symphony Orchestra; André Previn, conductor
1977	Ravel: Piano Concerto in G Major, M. 83, Concerto for the Left Hand	Aldo Ciccolini, soloist; Orchestre de Paris; Jean Martinon, conductor
1977	Strauss: Don Quixote	Mstislav Rostropovich, soloist; Berlin Philharmonic; Herbert von Karajan, conductor
1978
1978	Vivaldi: The Four Seasons	Itzhak Perlman, soloist; London Philharmonic; Itzhak Perlman, conductor
1978	Beethoven: Piano Concerto No. 4 in G Minor, Op. 58	Maurizio Pollini, soloist; Vienna Philharmonic; Karl Böhm, conductor
1978	Beethoven: Complete Concertos for Piano	Alfred Brendel, soloist; London Philharmonic; Bernard Haitink, conductor
1978	Brahms: Piano Concerto No. 2 in B Flat Minor, Op. 83	Solomon, soloist; Philharmonia Orchestra; Issay Dobrowen, conductor
1978	Concertos from Spain	Alicia de Larrocha, soloist; Royal Philharmonic Orchestra; Rafael Frühbeck de Burgos, conductor
1978	Elgar: Cello Concerto in E Minor, Op. 85	Jacqueline Du Pre, soloist; Philadelphia Orchestra; Daniel Barenboim, conductor
1978	Rachmaninoff: Piano Concerto No. 3 in D Minor, Op. 30	Lazar Berman, soloist; London Symphony Orchestra; Claudio Abbado, conductor
1978	Schumann: Cello Concerto in A Minor, Op. 129, Bloch: Schelomo	Mstislav Rostropovich, soloist; Orchestre National de France; Leonard Bernstein, conductor
1979
1979	Rachmaninoff: Piano Concerto No. 3 in D Minor, Op. 30	Vladimir Horowitz, soloist; New York Philharmonic; Eugene Ormandy, conductor
1979	Brahms: Violin Concerto in D Major, Op. 77	Itzhak Perlman, soloist; Chicago Symphony Orchestra; Carlo Maria Giulini, conductor
1979	Chopin: Piano Concerto No. 2 in F Minor, Op. 21	Emanuel Ax, soloist; Philadelphia Orchestra; Eugene Ormandy, conductor
1979	Dvořák: Cello Concerto in B Minor, Op. 104, BB. 191, Saint-Saëns: Cello Concerto No. 1 in A Minor, Op. 33	Mstislav Rostropovich, soloist; London Philharmonic; Carlo Maria Giulini, conductor
1979	Mozart: Piano Concerto No. 21 in C Major, K. 467, Piano Concerto No. 9 in E Flat Major, K. 271	Murray Perahia, soloist; English Chamber Orchestra; Murray Perahia, conductor
1979	Vaughan Williams: Tuba Concerto in F Minor	Emanuel Ax, soloist; Philadelphia Orchestra; Eugene Ormandy, conductor

=== 1980s ===
Year	Recording	Artist(s)
1980
1980	Bartók: Piano Concertos No. 1 and No. 2	Maurizio Pollini, soloist; Chicago Symphony Orchestra; Claudio Abbado, conductor
1980	Annie's Song and Other Galway Favourites	James Galway, soloist; National Philharmonic Orchestra; Charles Gerhardt, conductor
1980	Chopin: Piano Concerto No. 1 in E Minor, Op. 11	Krystian Zimerman, soloist; Los Angeles Philharmonic; Carlo Maria Giulini, conductor
1980	Horn Concertos by Joseph Haydn and Michael Haydn	Barry Tuckwell, soloist; English Chamber Orchestra; Barry Tuckwell, conductor
1980	Isaac Stern and Jean-Pierre Rampal Play Vivaldi and Telemann	Isaac Stern and Jean-Pierre Rampal, soloists; Jerusalem Music Centre Chamber Orchestra
1980	Mozart: Violin Concertos No. 3 and No. 5	Anne-Sophie Mutter, soloist; Berlin Philharmonic; Herbert von Karajan, conductor
1980	Trumpet Concertos by Haydn, Teleman, Albinoni and Marcello	Maurice André, soloist; London Philharmonic; Jesús López Cobos, conductor
1981
1981	Berg: Violin Concerto, Stravinsky: Violin Concerto in D	Itzhak Perlman, soloist; Boston Symphony Orchestra; Seiji Ozawa, conductor
1981	Brahms: Double Concerto in A Minor, Op. 102	Itzhak Perlman, Mstislav Rostropovich, soloists; Concertgebouw Orchestra; Bernard Haitink, conductor
1981	Bach Works for Trumpet	Maurice André, soloist; Franz Liszt Chamber Orchestra; Maurice André, conductor
1981	Bartók: Violin Concerto No. 2 BB 117	Pinchas Zukerman, soloist; Los Angeles Philharmonic; Zubin Mehta, conductor
1981	Telemann: Flute Concertos in G and C; Suite in A Minor	James Galway, soloist; I Solisti di Zagreb
1981	The Classic Trumpet Concertos of Haydn and Hummel	Gerard Schwarz, soloist; Y Chamber Symohpny of New York; Gerard Schwarz, conductor
1982
1982	Isaac Stern 60th Anniversary Collection	Itzhak Perlman, Isaac Stern, Pinchas Zukerman soloists; New York Philharmonic; Zubin Mehta, conductor
1982	Chopin: Piano Concerto No. 1 in E Minor, Op. 11	Emanuel Ax, soloist; Philadelphia Orchestra; Eugene Ormandy, conductor
1982	Corigliano: Concerto for Clarinet and Orchestra	Stanley Drucker, soloist; New York Philharmonic; Zubin Mehta, conductor
1982	French Flute Concertos	James Galway, soloist; Royal Philharmonic Orchestra; Charles Dutoit, conductor
1982	Sibelius: Violin Concerto in D Minor, Op. 47, Saint-Saëns: Introduction and Rondo Capriccioso	Dylana Jenson, soloist; Philadelphia Orchestra; Eugene Ormandy, conductor
1983
1983	Edward Elgar: Violin Concerto in B Minor	Itzhak Perlman, soloist; Chicago Symphony Orchestra; Daniel Barenboim, conductor
1983	Beethoven: Piano Concerto No. 4 in G Major, Op. 58	Rudolf Serkin, soloist; Boston Symphony Orchestra; Seiji Ozawa, conductor
1983	Ashkenazy Plays and Conducts Mozart	Vladimir Ashkenazy, soloist; Philharmonia Orchestra; Vladimir Ashkenazy, conductor
1983	Schumann: Piano Concerto in A Minor, Op. 54, Rachmaninoff: Piano Concerto No. 2 in C Minor, Op. 18	Alicia de Larrocha, soloist; Royal Philharmonic Orchestra; Charles Dutoit, conductor
1983	Vivaldi: The Four Seasons	Joseph Silverstein, soloist; Boston Symphony Orchestra; Seiji Ozawa, conductor
1984
1984	Haydn, Hummel, L. Mozart: Trumpet Concertos	Wynton Marsalis, soloist; National Philharmonic Orchestra; Raymond Leppard, conductor
1984	Beethoven: Piano Concerto No. 3 in C Minor, Op. 37	Rudolf Serkin, soloist; Boston Symphony Orchestra; Seiji Ozawa, conductor
1984	Gershwin: Rhapsody in Blue	Leonard Bernstein, soloist; Los Angeles Philharmonic; Leonard Bernstein, conductor
1984	Mozart: Violin Concertos No. 3 in G Major, K 216 and No. 5 in A Major, K 219	Itzhak Perlman, soloist; Vienna Philharmonic; James Levine, conductor
1984	Vivaldi: The Four Seasons	Simon Standage, soloist; English Concert; Trevor Pinnock, conductor
1984	Vivaldi: The Four Seasons, Concerto for Four Violins	Isaac Stern, Pinchas Zukerman, Itzhak Perlman, Shlomo Mintz, Ivry Gitlis, Ida Haendel, soloists; Israel Philharmonic Orchestra; Zubin Mehta, conductor
1984	Weber: Clarinet Concerto No. 1 in F Minor, Op. 73	Richard Stoltzman, soloist; Mostly Mozart Festival Orchestra; Alexander Schneider, conductor
1985
1985	Wynton Marsalis, Edita Gruberova: Handel, Purcell, Torelli, Fasch, Molter	Wynton Marsalis, soloist; English Chamber Orchestra; Raymond Leppard, conductor
1985	Beethoven: The 5 Piano Concertos	Alfred Brendel, soloist; Chicago Symphony Orchestra; James Levine, conductor
1985	Brahms: Piano Concerto No. 1 in D Minor	Emanuel Ax, soloist; Chicago Symphony Orchestra; James Levine, conductor
1985	Rodrigo: Concierto de Aranjuez, Invocation and Dance; 3 Spanish Pieces (Vol. 8)	Julian Bream, soloist; Chamber Orchestra of Europe; John Eliot Gardiner, conductor
1985	Wieniawski: Violin Concerto No. 2 in D Minor, Op. 22, Saint-Saëns: Violin Concerto No. 3 in B Minor, Op. 61	Itzhak Perlman, soloist; Orchestre de Paris; Daniel Barenboim, conductor
1986
1986	Elgar: Cello Concerto in E Minor, Op. 85, Walton: Concerto for Cello & Orchestra	Yo-Yo Ma, soloist; London Symphony Orchestra; André Previn, conductor
1986	Gershwin: Rhapsody in Blue	André Previn, soloist; Pittsburgh Symphony Orchestra; André Previn, conductor
1986	Gershwin: Second Rhapsody for Orchestra with Piano	Michael Tilson Thomas, soloist; Los Angeles Philharmonic; Michael Tilson Thomas, conductor
1986	James Galway Plays Khachaturian	James Galway, soloist; Royal Philharmonic Orchestra; Myung-whun Chung, conductor
1986	Khachaturian: Violin Concerto in D Minor	Itzhak Perlman, soloist; Israel Philharmonic Orchestra; Zubin Mehta, conductor
1986	Schumann: Piano Concerto in A Minor, Op. 54, Chopin: Piano Concerto No. 2 in F Minor, Op. 21	Andras Schiff, soloist; Concertgebouw Orchestra; Antal Doráti, conductor
1987	No Award Given	
1988
1988	Mozart: Violin Concerto No. 2 in D Major, K. 211 and No. 4 in D Major, K. 218	Itzhak Perlman, soloist; Vienna Philharmonic; James Levine, conductor
1988	Barber: Violin Concerto, Op. 14	Elmar Oliveira, soloist; St. Louis Symphony; Leonard Slatkin, conductor
1988	Beethoven: Piano Concerto No. 5 in E Flat Minor, Op. 73	Murray Perahia, soloist; Concertgebouw Orchestra; Bernard Haitink, conductor
1988	Carnival (Works by Arban, Clarke, Levy, Paganini, Rimsky Korsakov, and Bellstedt)	Wynton Marsalis, soloist; Eastman Wind Ensemble; Donald Hunsberger, conductor
1988	Mozart: Horn Concertos no. 1-4, Rondo, Fragment	Itzhak Perlman, soloist; Israel Philharmonic Orchestra; Zubin Mehta, conductor
1989
1989	Mozart: Piano Concerto No. 23 in A Major, K. 488	Vladimir Horowitz, soloist; La Scala Opera Orchestra; Carlo Maria Giulini, conductor
1989	Baroque Music for Trumpets (Vivaldi, Telemann, Pachelbel, Haydn, Biber)	Wynton Marsalis, soloist; English Chamber Orchestra; Raymond Leppard, conductor
1989	Bartók: Works for Piano and Orchestra	Zoltán Kocsis, soloist; Budapest Festival Orchestra; Ivan Fischer, conductor
1989	Brahms: Double Concerto in A Minor, Op. 102	Isaac Stern, Yo-Yo Ma soloists; Chicago Symphony Orchestra; Claudio Abbado, conductor
1989	Bruch: Scottish Fantasy, Violin Concerto No. 2 in D Minor, Op. 44	Itzhak Perlman, soloist; Israel Philharmonic Orchestra; Zubin Mehta, conductor
1989	Dutilleux: L'arbre des songes	Isaac Stern, soloist; Orchestre National de France; Lorin Maazel, conductor
1989	The Art of Gary Gray (Aaron Copland: Clarinet Concerto, Witold Lutosławski: Dance Preludes for Clarinet and Orchestra)	Gary Gray, soloist; Royal Philharmonic Orchestra; Harry Newstone, conductor

=== 1990s ===
Year	Recording	Artist(s)
1990
1990	Barber: Cello Concerto in A Minor, Op. 22, Britten: Cello Symphony, Op. 68	Yo-Yo Ma, soloist; Baltimore Symphony Orchestra; David Zinman, conductor
1990	Copland: Clarinet Concerto	David Shifrin, soloist; New York Chamber Symphony; Gerard Schwarz, conductor
1990	Gubaidulina: Offertorium	Charles Dutoit, soloist; Boston Symphony Orchestra; Gidon Kremer, conductor
1990	Schumann: Violin Concerto in D Minor, WoO 23, Bernstein: Serenade for Violin, Strings, and Percussion	Robert McDuffie, soloist; St. Louis Symphony Orchestra; Leonard Slatkin, conductor
1990	Shostakovich: Violin Concerto No. 1 in A Minor, Op. 77, Prokofiev: Violin Concerto No. 2 in G Minor, Op. 63	Viktoria Mullova, soloist; Royal Philharmonic Orchestra; André Previn, conductor
1991
1991	Shostakovich: Violin Concerto No. 1 in A Minor, Op. 77, Glazunov: Violin Concerto in A Minor, Op. 82	Itzhak Perlman, soloist; Israel Philharmonic Orchestra; Zubin Mehta, conductor
1991	Hanson: Fantasy Variations On A Theme of Youth	Gerard Schwarz, soloist; Carol Rosenberger, conductor
1991	Lazarof: Tableaux (After Kandinsky)	Garrick Ohlsson, soloist; Seattle Symphony Orchestra; Gerard Schwarz, conductor
1991	Stravinsky: Works for Piano and Orchestra	Paul Crossley, soloist; London Sinfonietta; Esa-Pekka Salonen, conductor
1991	Trumpet Concertos (Haydn, Hummel, Tartini, Torelli, and Bellini)	Rolf Smedvig, soloist; Scottish Chamber Orchestra; Jahja Ling, conductor
1992
1992	Barber: Piano Concerto, Op. 38	John Browning, soloist; St. Louis Symphony Orchestra; Leonard Slatkin, conductor
1992	Bartók: Violin Concerto No. 2, BB117, Violin Concerto No. 1, Sz. 36 BB 48a, No. 2 Alternative Ending	Pinchas Zukerman, soloist; St. Louis Symphony Orchestra; Leonard Slatkin, conductor
1992	Copland: Clarinet Concerto	Stanley Drucker, soloist; New York Philharmonic; Leonard Bernstein, conductor
1992	Mozart: Piano Concerto No. 1 in B Flat Major, KV. 450 and Piano Concerto No. 16 in D Major, KV. 451	Mitsuko Uchida, soloist; English Chamber Orchestra; Jeffrey Tate, conductor
1992	Schnittke: Viola Concerto	Yuri Bashmet, soloist; London Symphony Orchestra; Mstislav Rostropovich, conductor
1992	Tchaikovsky: Variations on a Rococo Theme, Op. 33	Yo-Yo Ma, soloist; Pittsburgh Symphony Orchestra; Lorin Maazel, conductor
1993
1993	Prokofiev: Sinfonia Concertante, Tchaikovsky: Variations on a Rococo Theme	Yo-Yo Ma, soloist; Pittsburgh Symphony Orchestra; Lorin Maazel, conductor
1993	Bartók: Violin Concerto No. 2, BB 117, Moret: En Rêve	Anne-Sophie Mutter, soloist; Boston Symphony Orchestra; Seiji Ozawa, conductor
1993	Medtner: Piano Concertos No. 1, No. 2, and No. 3	Geoffrey Tozer, soloist
1993	Mozart: Piano Concerto No. 23 in A Major, K. 448 and Piano Concerto No. 24 in C Minor, K. 491	Alicia de Larrocha, soloist; English Chamber Orchestra; Colin Davis, conductor
1993	Rachmaninoff: Piano Concerto No. 2 in C Minor, Op. 18 & Piano Concerto No. 3 in D Minor, Op. 30	Horacio Gutierrez, soloist; Pittsburgh Symphony Orchestra; Lorin Maazel, conductor
1994
1994	Berg: Violin Concerto, Wolfgang Rihm: Time Chant	Anne-Sophie Mutter, soloist; Chicago Symphony Orchestra; James Levine, conductor
1994	Brahms: Piano Concerto No. 1 in D Minor, Op. 15	Stephen Kovacevich, soloist; London Philharmonic; Wolfgang Sawallisch, conductor
1994	Copland: Clarinet Concerto	Richard Stoltzman, soloist; London Symphony Orchestra; Michael Tilson Thomas, conductor
1994	Ravel: Piano Concerto for the Left Hand in D Major	Leon Fleisher, soloist; Boston Symphony Orchestra; Seiji Ozawa, conductor
1994	Tchaikovsky: Violin Concerto in D Major, Op. 35	Gil Shaham, soloist; Philharmonia Orchestra; Giuseppe Sinopoli, conductor
1995
1995	The New York Album - Works of Albert, Bartók, and Bloch	Yo-Yo Ma, soloist; Baltimore Symphony Orchestra; David Zinman, conductor
1995	Bartók: Violin Concerto No. 2, BB 117	Kyung-Wha Chung, soloist; City of Birmingham Symphony Orchestra; Simon Rattle, conductor
1995	Korngold: Violin Concerto in D Major, Op. 35	Gil Shaham, soloist; London Symphony Orchestra; André Previn, conductor
1995	Prokofiev: Piano Concerto No. 2 in G Minor, Op. 16	Yefim Bronfman, soloist; Israel Philharmonic Orchestra; Zubin Mehta, conductor
1995	Schoenberg/Liszt: Piano Concertos	Emanuel Ax, soloist; Philharmonia Orchestra; Esa-Pekka Salonen, conductor
1996
1996	The American Album - Works of Bernstein, Barber, and Foss	Itzhak Perlman, soloist; Boston Symphony Orchestra; Seiji Ozawa, conductor
1996	Chopin: Piano Concerto No. 2 in F Minor, Op. 21	Maria João Pires, soloist; Royal Philharmonic; André Previn, conductor
1996	Messiaen: Concert à quatre	Catherine Cantin, Heinz Holliger, Yvonne Loriod, Mstislav Rostropovich, soloists; Orchestre de l'Opéra Bastille; Myung-Whun Chung, conductor
1996	Prokofiev: Piano Concerto No. 1 in D Flat Major, Op. 10 & Piano Concerto No. 3 in C Major, Op. 26	Evgeny Kissin, soloist; Berlin Philharmonic; Claudio Abbado, conductor
1996	Prokofiev/Shostakovich: Violin Concertos No. 1	Maxim Vengerov, soloist; London Symphony Orchestra; Mstislav Rostropovich, conductor
1997
1997	Bartók: The Three Piano Concertos	Yefim Bronfman, soloist; Los Angeles Philharmonic; Esa-Pekka Salonen, conductor
1997	Adams: Violin Concerto	Gidon Kremer, soloist; London Symphony Orchestra; Kent Nagano, conductor
1997	Prokofiev: Violin Concerto No. 2 in G Minor, Op. 63	Gil Shaham, soloist; London Symphony Orchestra; André Previn, conductor
1997	Schoenberg: Piano Concerto	Alfred Brendel, soloist; Southwest German Radio Symphony Orchestra; Michael Gielen, conductor
1997	Shostakovich: Cello Concertos No. 1 & No. 2	Truls Mørk, soloist; Oslo Philharmonic Orchestra; Vasily Petrenko, conductor
1998
1998	Premieres - Cello Concertos (Works of Danielpour, Kirchner, Rouse)	Yo-Yo Ma, soloist; Philadelphia Orchestra; David Zinman, conductor
1998	Barber/Walton: Violin Concertos; Bloch: Baal Shem	Joshua Bell, soloist; Baltimore Symphony Orchestra; David Zinman, conductor
1998	Mozart: Piano Concerto No. 18 & No. 20	Richard Goode, soloist; Orpheus Chamber Orchestra
1998	Schwantner: Concerto for Percussion and Orchestra	Evelyn Glennie, soloist; National Symphony Orchestra; Leonard Slatkin, conductor
1998	Tchaikovsky: Piano Concerto No. 1 in B Flat Minor, Op. 23	Martha Argerich, soloist; Berliner Philharmonic; Claudio Abbado, conductor
1999
1999	Penderecki: Violin Concerto No. 2, Metamorphosen	Anne-Sophie Mutter, soloist; London Symphony Orchestra; Krzysztof Penderecki, conductor
1999	Brahms: Violin Concerto in D Major, Op. 77; Schumann: Violin Concerto No. 2 in C Major, Op. 131	Anne-Sophie Mutter, soloist; New York Philharmonic; Kurt Masur, conductor
1999	Elgar: Violin Concerto in B Minor, Op. 61	Nigel Kennedy, soloist; City of Birmingham Symphony Orchestra; Simon Rattle, conductor
1999	Prokofiev/Shostakovich: Violin Concertos No. 2	Maxim Vengerov, soloist; London Symphony Orchestra; Mstislav Rostropovich, conductor
1999	Schumann: Piano Concerto in A Minor, Op. 54	Murray Perahia, soloist; Berlin Philharmonic; Claudio Abbado, conductor

=== 2000s ===
Year	Recording	Artist(s)
2000
2000	Prokofiev: Piano Concertos No. 1 & No. 3/Bartók: Piano Concerto No. 3 in E Major, Sz. 119, BB 127	Martha Argerich, soloist; Montreal Symphony Orchestra; Charles Dutoit, conductor
2000	Bartók: Violin Concerto No. 2 in G Major Sz. 95, BB 101; Rhapsodies No. 1 & No. 2	Gil Shaham, soloist; Chicago Symphony Orchestra; Pierre Boulez, conductor
2000	Beethoven: Violin Concerto D Major, Op. 61; Bernatein: Serenade after Plato's "Symposium"	Hilary Hahn, soloist; Baltimore Symphony Orchestra; David Zinman, conductor
2000	Britten: Double Concerto in B Minor	Yuri Bashmet, Gidon Kremer soloists; Hallé Orchestra; Kent Nagano, conductor
2000	Scriabin: Piano Concerto in F Sharp Minor, Op. 20	Anatol Ugorski, soloist; Chicago Symphony Orchestra; Pierre Boulez, conductor
2001
2001	Maw: Violin Concerto	Joshua Bell, soloist; London Philharmonic; Roger Norrington, conductor; Grace Row, producer; Charles Harbutt, engineer
2001	Busoni: Piano Concerto in C Major, Op. 39	Marc-André Hamelin, soloist; City of Birmingham Symphony Orchestra; Mark Elder, conductor
2001	Carter: Clarinet Concerto	Michael Collins, soloist; London Sinfonietta; Oliver Knussen, conductor
2001	Haydn: Piano Concertos No. 3, No. 4, & No. 11	Leif Ove Andsnes, soloist; Det Norske Kammerorkester; Leif Ove Andsnes, conductor
2001	Rachmaninoff: Piano Concerto No. 3 in D Minor, Op. 30	Arcadi Volodos, soloist; Berlin Philharmonic; James Levine, conductor
2002
2002	Strauss: Horn Concertos (Horn Concerto, Oboe Concerto, etc.)	Daniel Barenboim, Dale Clevenger, Larry Combs, Alex Klein, David McGill soloists; Chicago Symphony Orchestra; Daniel Barenboim, conductor; Martin Fouqué, producer; Eberhard Sengpiel, engineer
2002	Ligeti: Piano Concerto	Pierre-Laurent Aimard, soloist; ASKO Ensemble; Reinbert de Leeuw, conductor
2002	Rouse: Concert de Gaudi; Tan Dun: Concerto for Guitar	Sharon Isbin, soloist; Gulbenkian Orchestra; Muhai Tang, conductor
2002	Schoenberg: Piano Concerto, Op. 42; Berg: Piano Sonata, Op. 1; Webern: Variations	Mitsuko Uchida, soloist; Cleveland Orchestra; Pierre Boulez, conductor
2002	Schumann: Violin Concerto in D Major, WoO 23	Philippe Quint, soloist; Bournemouth Symphony Orchestra; José Serebrier, conductor
2003
2003	Brahms: Violin Concerto in D Major, Op. 77; Stravinsky: Violin Concerto in D	Hilary Hahn, soloist; Academy of St. Martin in the Fields; Sir Neville Marriner, conductor; Thomas Frost, producer; Richard King, engineer
2003	Bach: Keyboard Concertos No. 3, No. 5, No. 6, & No. 7	Murray Perahia, soloist; Academy of St. Martin in the Fields; Murray Perahia, conductor
2003	Barber: Violin Concerto, Op. 14, A Scene From Shelley, etc.	James Buswell, soloist; Royal Scottish National Orchestra; Marin Alsop, conductor
2003	Kancheli: Styx; Gubaidulina: Violin Concerto	Yuri Bashmet, soloist; Orchestra of the Mariinsky Theater; Valery Gergiev, conductor
2003	Saint-Saëns: The Complete Works for Piano and Orchestra	Stephen Hough, soloist; City of Birmingham Symphony Orchestra; Sakari Oramo, conductor
2004
2004	Britten: Violin Concerto, Op. 15; Walton: Viola Concerto	Maxim Vengerov, soloist; London Symphony Orchestra; Mstislav Rostropovich, conductor
2004	Beach: Piano Concerto in C Sharp Minor, Op. 45	Alan Feinberg, soloist; Nashville Symphony Orchestra; Kenneth Schermerhorn, conductor
2004	Prokofiev: Piano Concerto No. 3 in C Major, Op. 26; Rachmaninoff: Piano Concerto No. 3 in D Minor, Op. 30	Mikhail Pletnev, soloist; Russian National Orchestra; Mstislav Rostropovich, conductor
2004	Prokofiev: Sinfonia Concertante	Han-Na Chang, soloist; London Symphony Orchestra; Antonio Pappano, conductor
2004	Svoboda: Concerto for Marimba and Orchestra, Op. 148	Niel DePonte, soloist; Oregon Symphony; James DePriest, conductor
2005
2005	Previn: Violin Concerto; Bernstein: Serenade after Plato's "Symposium"	Anne-Sophie Mutter, soloist; Boston Symphony Orchestra; André Previn, conductor
2005	Berg: Violin Concerto; Britten: Violin Concerto, Op. 15	Daniel Hope, soloist; BBC Symphony Orchestra; Paul Watkins, conductor
2005	Bliss: Piano Concerto In B Flat, Op. 58	Peter Donohoe, soloist; Royal Scottish National Orchestra; David Lloyd-Jones, conductor
2005	Carter: Piano Concerto	Mark Wait, soloist; Nashville Symphony Orchestra; Kenneth Schermerhorn, conductor
2005	Mansurian: ...And Then I Was In Time Again	Kim Kashkashian, soloist; Munich Chamber Orchestra; Christoph Poppen, conductor
2006
2006	Beethoven: Piano Concertos No. 2 & No. 3	Martha Argerich, soloist; Mahler Chamber Orchestra; Claudio Abbado, conductor
2006	Fuchs: Eventide	Thomas Stacy, soloist; London Symphony Orchestra; JoAnn Falletta, conductor
2006	Schoenberg: Concerto for String Quartet and Orchestra	Fred Sherry String Quartet, soloists; Twentieth Century Classics Ensemble; Robert Craft, conductor
2006	Schumann: Cello Concerto in A Minor, Op. 129; Bloch: Schelomo	Truls Mørk, soloist; Orchestre philharmonique de Radio France; Paavo Järvi, conductor
2006	Daugherty: UFO	Evelyn Glennie, soloist; Colorado Symphony; Marin Alsop, conductor
2007
2007	Messiaen: Oiseaux exotiques	Angelin Chang, soloist; Cleveland Chamber Symphony; John McLaughlin Williams, conductor
2007	Brahms: The Piano Concertos	Nelson Freire, soloist; Gewandhaus Orchester; Riccardo Chailly, conductor
2007	Henze: Violin Concertos No. 1 & No. 3	Peter Sheppard Skaerved, soloist; Saarbrücker Radio Symphony Orchestra; Christopher Lyndon-Gee, conductor
2007	Rachmaninoff: Piano Concertos No. 1 & No. 2	Leif Ove Andsnes, soloist; Berliner Philharmoniker; Antonio Pappano, conductor
2007	Schmidt: Concertos	Ulla Miilmann, soloist; Danish National Symphony Orchestra; Ole Schmidt, conductor
2008
2008	Barber/Korngold/Walton: Violin Concertos	James Ehnes, soloist; Vancouver Symphony Orchestra; Bramwell Tovey, conductor
2008	Beethoven: Piano Concertos No. 1 & No. 4	Lang Lang, soloist; Orchestre de Paris; Christoph Eschenbach, conductor
2008	Nielsen: Clarinet & Flute Concertos	Sabine Meyer, Emmanuel Pahud soloists; Berliner Philharmoniker; Simon Rattle, conductor
2008	Rózsa: Violin Concerto, Op. 24	Anastasia Khitruk, soloist; Russian Philharmonic Orchestra; Dmitry Yablonsky, conductor
2008	Tchaikovsky/Saint-Saëns/Ginastera	Sol Gabetta, soloist; Münchner Rundfunkorchester; Ari Rasilainen, conductor
2009
2009	Schoenberg/Sibelius: Violin Concertos	Hilary Hahn, soloist; Swedish Radio Symphony Orchestra; Esa-Pekka Salonen, conductor
2009	Bloch/Lees: Violin Concertos	Wu Man, soloist; Chicago Symphony Orchestra; Miguel Harth-Bedoya, conductor
2009	Harrison: Pipa Concerto	Sabine Meyer, Emmanuel Pahud soloists; Berliner Philharmoniker; Simon Rattle, conductor
2009	Mozart: Piano Concertos No. 17 & No. 20	Leif Ove Andsnes, soloist; Norwegian Chamber Orchestra; Leif Ove Andsnes, conductor
2009	Saint-Saëns: Piano Concertos No. 2 & No. 5	Jean-Yves Thibaudet, soloist; Orchestre de la Suisse Romande; Charles Dutoit, conductor

=== 2010s ===
Year	Recording	Artist(s)
2010
2010	Prokofiev: Piano Concertos No. 2 & No. 3	Evgeny Kissin, soloist; Philharmonia Orchestra; Vladimir Ashkenazy, conductor
2010	Bartók: 3 Concertos	Pierre-Laurent Aimard, Yuri Bashmet, Gidon Kremer, Neil Percy, Tamara Stefanovich, & Nigel Thomas, soloists; Berliner Philharmoniker; Pierre Boulez, conductor
2010	Bermel: Voices For Solo Clarinet and Orchestra	Derek Bermel, soloist; Boston Modern Orchestra Project; Gil Rose, conductor
2010	Korngold: Violin Concerto in D Major, Op. 35	Philippe Quint, soloist; Orquestra Sinfónica de Mineria; Carlos Miguel Prieto, conductor
2010	Salonen: Piano Concerto	Yefim Bronfman, soloist; Los Angeles Philharmonic; Esa-Pekka Salonen, conductor
2011
2011	Mozart: Piano Concertos No. 23 & No. 24	Mitsuko Uchida, soloist; Cleveland Orchestra; Mitsuko Uchida, conductor
2011	Daugherty: Deus ex Machina	Terrence Wilson, soloist; Nashville Symphony; Giancarlo Guerrero, conductor
2011	Dorman: Mandolin Concerto	Avi Avital, soloist; Metropolis Ensemble; Andrew Cyr, conductor
2011	Kletzki: Piano Concerto in D Minor, Op. 22	Joseph Banowetz, soloist; Russian Philharmonic Orchestra; Thomas Sanderling, conductor
2011	Porter: Concerto for Viola & Orchestra	Eliesha Nelson, soloist; Northwest Sinfonia; John McLaughlin Williams, conductor
