= Ursula Bagdasarjanz =

Swiss violinist (born 1934)

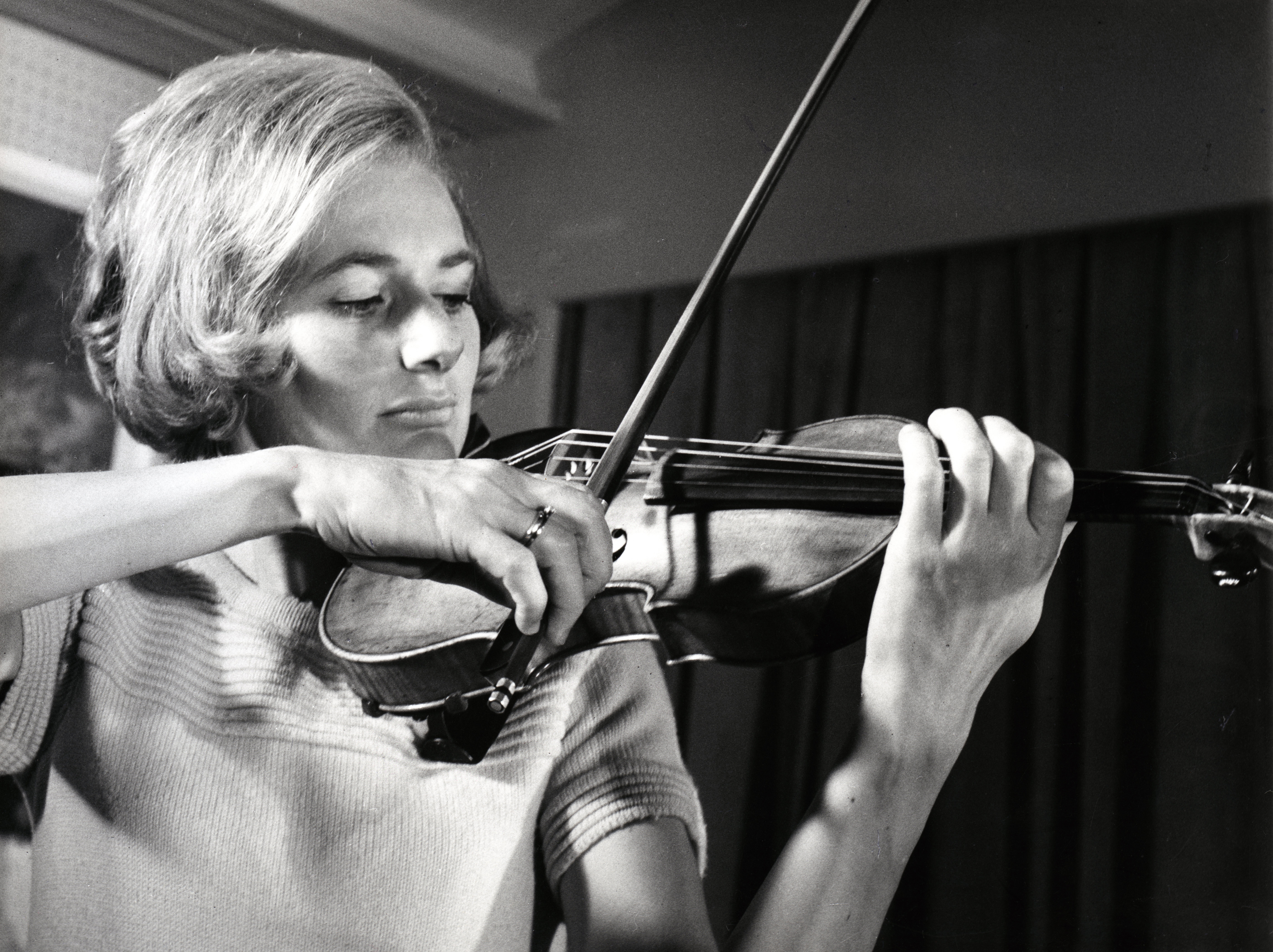
Ursula Bagdasarjanz with a Stradivari from the Rolf Habisreutinger Collection

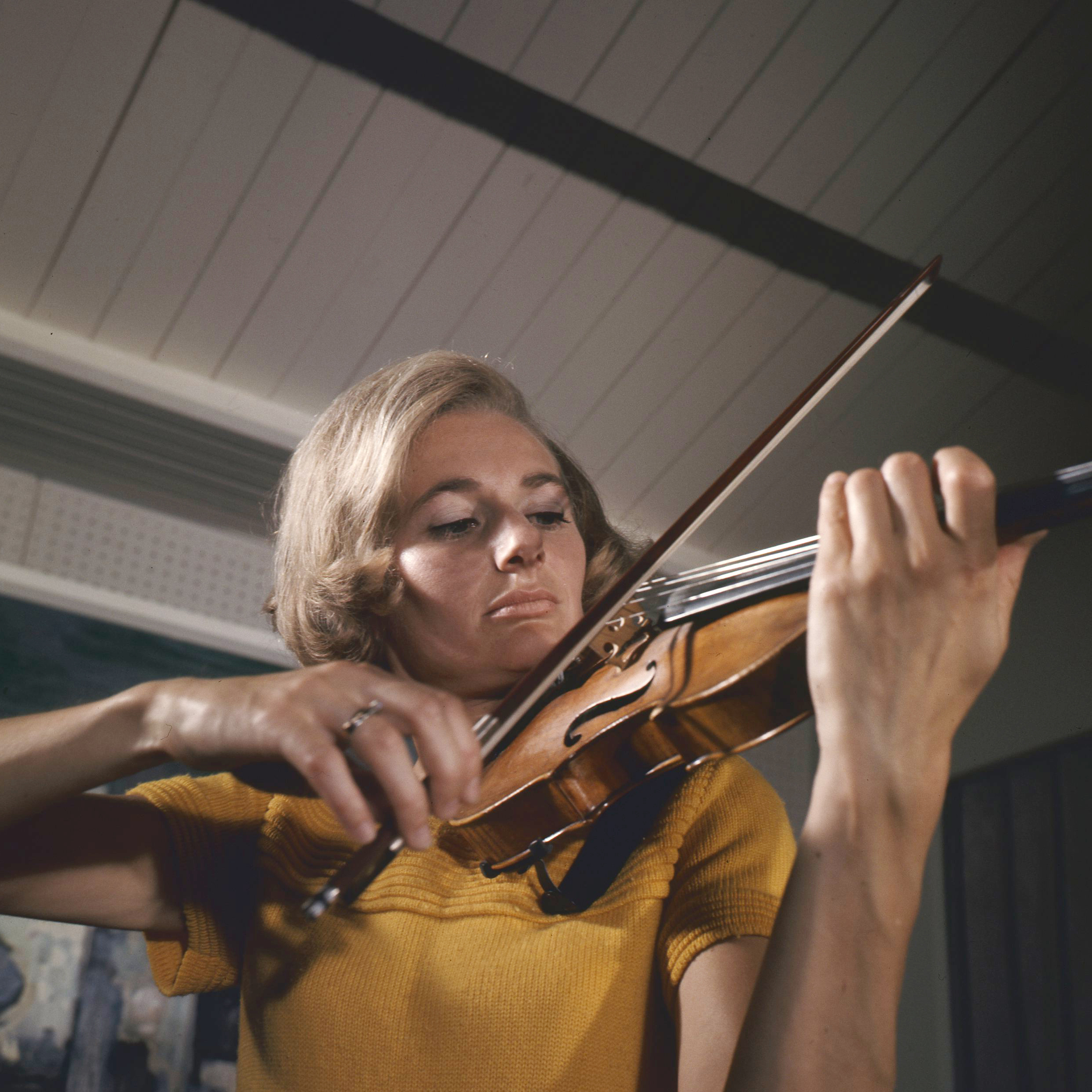
Ursula Bagdasarjanz with a Stradivari from the Rolf Habisreutinger Collection

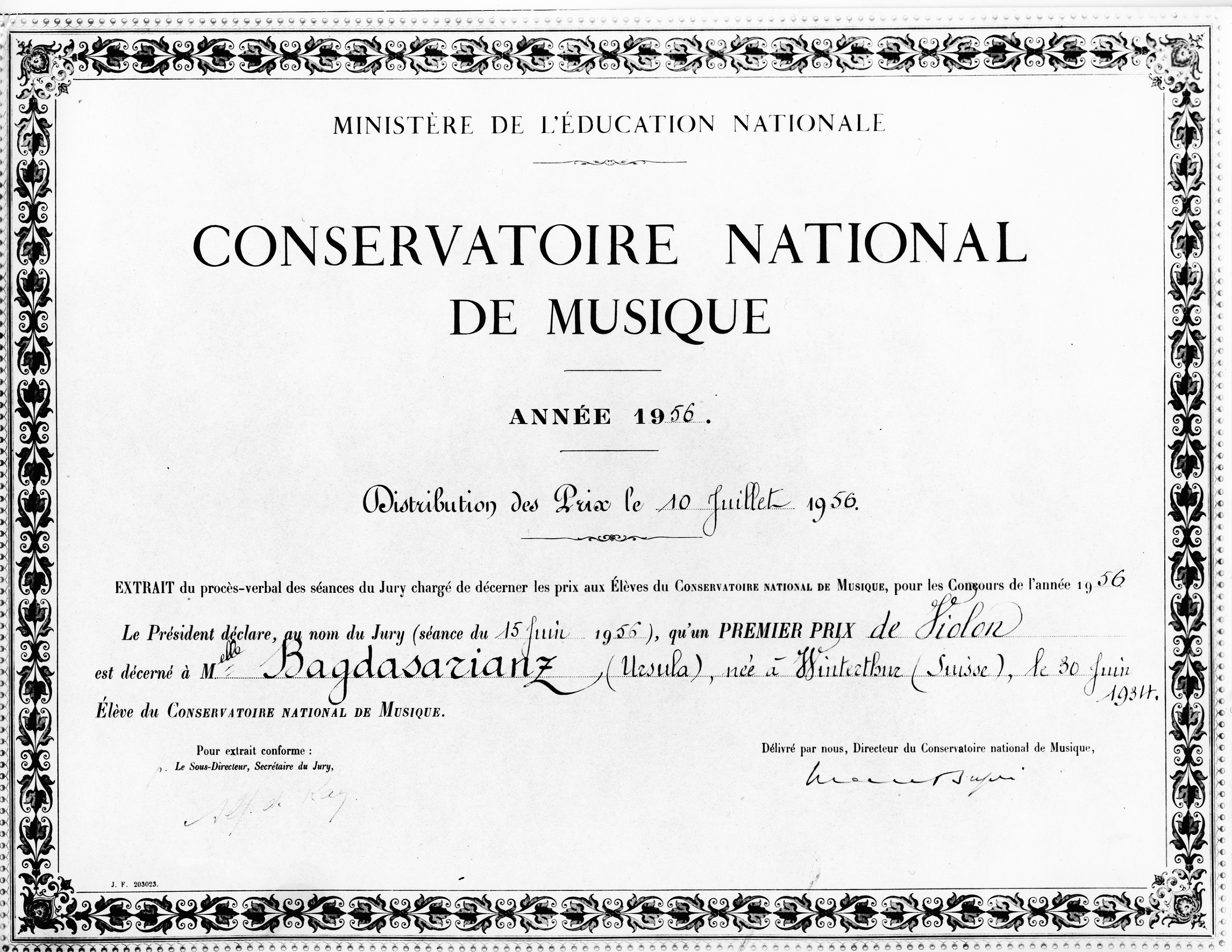
Conservatoire National de Musique Paris, first prize for violin, July 10th 1956

Ursula Bagdasarjanz (born 30 June 1934) is a Swiss violinist.

== Early life ==
Ursula Bagdasarjanz was born in Winterthur, Switzerland. Her father, Samuel Bagdasarjanz, was born in Romania, from where his family emigrated to Switzerland. Her mother, Margrit Weiss, born in Switzerland, was also a violinist who mentored Ursula from an early age. In 1944, at the age of ten, Ursula Bagdasarjanz gave her first concert (Beethoven Romance in F major). Her teachers were Aida Stucki in Winterthur (1944–1953); Marcel Reynal at the Conservatoire National Supérieur de Musique in Paris, France (1953–1956), where she was awarded the "Premier Prix de Violon" in 1956; and Sándor Végh in Basel, Switzerland (1957 and 1958). She took masterclasses with Joseph Calvet in Paris and Max Rostal in Bern. At the time Ursula Bagdasarjanz was taking violin lessons from Aida Stucki, the latter was herself a student of the renowned violinist Carl Flesch. This gave Ursula the opportunity of familiarising herself with a unique method of work for violinists, the Carl Flesch scale system, from a young age.

In 2000, another Aida Stucki student, the virtuoso violinist Anne-Sophie Mutter, wrote the introduction to Eric Rosenblith's new edition (published in English) to Carl Flesch's book on "The Art of Violin Playing".

Another violinist having done extensive work on Carl Flesch's works was Max Rostal. He published a new, revised and broader edition of the scale system in 1987 and passed his in-depth knowledge of the standard works of Carl Flesch on to students attending his masterclasses.

As both a soloist and a chamber musician, Ursula Bagdasarjanz pursued an active concert career. She did much for the composer Othmar Schoeck. She performed a full range of his violin works, including recordings of all his violin sonatas, accompanied by Gisela Schoeck, the composer's daughter.

== Concert performance 1956–1982 overview ==
Before beginning her studies at the Conservatoire National Supérieur in Paris, Ursula Bagdasarjanz was awarded 1st prize at the Concours Bellan in Paris, France. While still studying, she made her first radio recording with Radio Paris-Inter. Many were to follow with the same station. After having completed her studies with the "Premier Prix de Violon", she returned to Switzerland. Her substantial concert career led her, in addition to solo performances in Switzerland, to a long concert tour in Spain, Germany, and Finland, where she became the Turku City Orchestra soloist. In Switzerland, she repeatedly performed as a soloist with great orchestras and famous conductors, such as the Tonhalle Orchestra Zurich and the city orchestras of Winterthur (in Winterthur, Glarus and Uster), St. Gallen, Aarau, Solothurn and Olten as well as the "Orchestra della Svizzera Italiana". Ursula Bagdasarjanz gave violin concerts and recitals at many music centres abroad: in Switzerland and, among others, in Barcelona, Berlin, Heidelberg, Darmstadt, Zurich, Winterthur, Geneva, Schaffhausen, Basel, Bern, Rorschach, Rapperswil, Herisau, and Stans. Her recordings in the radio studios of Zurich, Lugano, Paris, and Berlin contributed significantly to making her more renowned as a Swiss soloist.

Ursula Bagdasarjanz performed as a soloist and narrator in a ZDF TV documentary, which introduced the public to a Swiss industrialist's pre-eminent collection of Stradivarius instruments. She was also part of the "Tonhalle Wettbewerb Zurich" jury (competition by Tonhalle Zurich).

In July 2001, 2002 and 2004, Ursula Bagdasarjanz was invited to Romania to give violin master classes in Târgu-Mureş. She was also a member of the jury of the Constantin Silvestri music competition. Ursula Bagdasarjanz gave an interview to radio București. Her CDs are highly appreciated.

Her long cooperation with the pianist Gisela Schoeck, the daughter of the composer Othmar Schoeck, should be particularly noted. Additionally, in June 1995, Ursula Bagdasarjanz was heard with Dr. Knaus on "Musik à la Carte", the Swiss Radio DRS broadcast, accompanied by music pieces from her CDs.

== Publications ==
- Book / Heft 1: "STORIES FROM THE VIOLIN / DIE GEIGE ERZÄHLT", Edition Kunzelmann (GM 1777a)
- Book / Heft 2: "THE OTHER WAY / DER ANDERE WEG", Edition Kunzelmann (GM 1777b)
- Book / Heft 3: "Sept poésies pour Violon et Piano", Edition Kunzelmann (GM 1833)

== CDs ==
=== Ursula Bagdasarjanz Vol. 1 ===
- Johann Sebastian Bach: Sonata in A Minor for violin solo.
- Pietro Nardini: Sonata in D Major for violin and piano.
- Wolfgang Amadeus Mozart: Sonata in B-flat Major for violin and piano, K. 378.
- Béla Bartók: First Rhapsody for violin and piano.

Ursula Bagdasarjanz (violin), Luciano Sgrizzi & Fernande Kaeser (piano).
Remastering 2008. Disques VDE-GALLO (GALLO CD 1248)

=== Ursula Bagdasarjanz Vol. 2 ===
- Othmar Schoeck: Sonata with variations, w/o op.22.
- Othmar Schoeck: Sonata in D Major for violin and piano, op.16.
- Othmar Schoeck: Sonata in E for violin and piano, op.46.

Ursula Bagdasarjanz (violin), Gisela Schoeck (piano).
Remastering 2008. Disques VDE-GALLO (GALLO CD 1249)

=== Ursula Bagdasarjanz Vol. 3 ===
- Othmar Schoeck: Violin concerto in B-flat Major, op. 21 (quasi una fantasia).
- Alexander Glasunow: Violin concerto in A Minor, op. 82.

Ursula Bagdasarjanz (violin), Radiorchestra Lugano. Directors: Francesco d'Avalos and Leopoldo Casella.
Remastering 2008. Disques VDE-GALLO (GALLO CD 1250)

=== Ursula Bagdasarjanz Vol. 4 "Sept poésies pour Violon et Piano" ===
- Ursula Bagdasarjanz: Berceuse, Dracula, Gipsy-Romance, Caprice, Joie de vivre, Rêverie, Introduction et petite Valse des Alpes.
- Wolfgang Amadeus Mozart: 1756–1791, Sonata in B-flat Major for violin and piano, K. 378 1. Allegro.
- Georg Friedrich Händel: 1685–1759, Sonata in F Major for violin and piano.
- Pietro Nardini: Sonata in D Major for violin and piano. 1. Adagio.
- Niccoló Paganini: 1782–1840, Sonata n°12 Op.3 for violin and piano.

Melanie Di Cristino (violin), Raluca Stirbat (piano), Ursula Bagdasarjanz (violin). Extraits de ses CDs.
Remastering 2008. Disques VDE-GALLO (GALLO CD 1251)

=== Ursula Bagdasarjanz Vol. 5 ===
- Wolfgang Amadeus Mozart: 1756–1791, Sonata in G Major KV 301 for violin and piano.
- Ludwig van Beethoven: 1770–1827, Sonata in A Major op.47 (Kreutzer Sonata) for violin and piano.
- Johannes Brahms: 1833–1897, Sonata in D-flat Minor op.108 for violin and piano.

Ursula Bagdasarjanz (Violin), Luciano Sgrizzi & Bruno F. Saladin (Piano).
Remastering 2011. Disques VDE-GALLO (GALLO CD 1352)

== CD reviews ==
The Strad, August 2009, by Julian Haylock.
Recordings by the legendary violinist Ursula Bagdasarjanz (b. 1934) are much prized by contemporary collectors, most especially her 1961 cycle of Othmar Schoeck's complete music for violin and piano with the composer's gifted daughter Gisela (Gallo CD-1249). The second volume in a reissue of these classic radio tapes features the op.22 variations and the op.16 and 46 sonatas in performances so authoritative and responsive to the music's remote idiom (think Hindemith with added warmth and charm) that it is impossible to imagine them ever being superseded. The mono recordings have been transferred most expertly, with plenty of body to the sound and a smooth treble response.

Fanfare Magazine, 6 August 2010, by Adrian Corleonis.
Ursula Bagdasarjanz: Schoeck Violin Sonatas on Gallo
Classical Reviews – Composers & Works
Chez Bagdasarjanz and Gisela Schoeck, the first sonata's lyricism and crackling high spirits awaken to sheer vivacity; the second's rumination and eeriness acquire a mordant and suddenly compelling conviction, lifting both works into a dimension only half-heartedly hinted at in other readings. The early 1905 sonata without opus number takes on a heretofore unexpected charm. Rescued from Swiss radio tapes made in 1961, Gallo's sound is close, well-balanced, and detailed. A companion issue featuring Bagdasarjanz performing Schoeck's Violin Concerto with the Lugano Radio Symphony (Gallo CD-1250) exhibits a similar nuance-rife fluency, while one hopes that more tapes of Gisela Schoeck will surface – her brilliance and swagger through the sonatas make one avid to hear her again in any repertoire. Enthusiastically recommended. – Adrian Corleonis

Fanfare Magazine, 6 October 2010, by Adrian Corleonis.
Departments – Want List
Accompanying the inspired violinistics of Ursula Bagdasarjanz, Gisela Schoeck animates her father's violin sonatas with an expressive flair beside which even the most sympathetic performances of all other would-be interpreters seem stodgy, academic. These artifacts raise the question once again, If one has heard a work only in competently clueless, professionally respectable performances, has one really heard it?

The WholeNote, November 2010, by Terry Robbins.
Ursula Bagdasarjanz Vol. 1: Bach; Nardini; Mozart; Bartók Ursula Bagdasarjanz; Luciano Sgrizzi; Fernande Kaeser (Gallo CD-1248)
Ursula Bagdasarjanz Vol. 2 - Othmar Schoeck Ursula Bagdasarjanz; Gisela Schoeck (Gallo CD-1249)
Current Reviews - Early, Classical and Beyond
Volume One features works by Bach, Nardini, Mozart and Bartók, recorded between 1960 and 1969, and demonstrates not only Bagdasarjanz's performance range but also the consistent elements in her playing: a big, warm tone; faultless intonation; a fairly heavy (but not wide) vibrato which is always used intelligently and sensitively; and a sophisticated sense of phrasing. The Bach A minor solo sonata is technically flawless, with a great sense of line and some remarkably tight triple-stopping in the Fuga. The big tone is evident in the Nardini D major sonata, the Mozart Bb major sonata K378, and Bartók's First Rhapsody. The piano sound is slightly fuzzy in the Nardini, but otherwise, the transfers are excellent.

"By far the most significant of the two CDs, however, is Volume Two, which features the complete works for violin and piano by the Swiss composer Othmar Schoeck. Recorded for Swiss Radio in 1961, only 4 years after the composer’s death, the three sonatas feature Schoeck’s daughter Gisela as the accompanist in performances that The Strad magazine rightly called “so authoritative… that it is impossible to imagine them ever being superseded.” All three sonatas – Op.16, Op.22 and Op.46 – are not part of the standard repertoire and are rarely performed these days, which is a real shame; the first two in particular, dating from the early 1900s, are strongly personal works reminiscent of Brahms and Franck. Again, the re-mastered sound is excellent."

"If you know Bagdasarjanz's playing – and recordings of her have always been pretty scarce – then you won't need to be told to get these CDs; if you don't know her playing, get them anyway – you won't be disappointed!"

American Record Guide, 1/2011, by MAGIL
SCHOECK Violin Sonatas
Ursula Badgasarjanz (violin), Gisela Schoeck (piano)
Gallo 1249, 50 minutes
Othmar Schoeck (1886–1957) was one of Switzerland's leading composers in the first half of the 20th century. Schoeck's themes are notable, his harmonic knowledge has an impressive range, and his material is expertly worked out. Of the three works presented here, the First and Second Violin Sonatas are frequently performed. Swiss violinist Ursula Bagdasarjanz recorded these pieces for Swiss radio in 1961. The composer's daughter, Gisela, plays the piano.

Fanfare Magazine by Robert Maxham, February 2012. ©
Ursula Bagdasarjanz: The fifth volume of Swiss violinist Ursula Bagdasarjanz's CD-collection
The fifth volume of Swiss violinist Ursula Bagdasarjanz's collection of studio and live recordings on the Gallo label contains three sonatas, one each by Wolfgang Amadeus Mozart, Ludwig van Beethoven, and Johannes Brahms. She and pianist Luciano Sgrizzi recorded Mozart's Sonata in G Major in Studio Lugano in April 1963; the engineers surrounded the duo with very little reverberation and Bagdasarjanz sounds very close up, but the realistic recorded sound virtually places a listener in the room (or places the listener in a virtual room) with the musicians. In general, Bagdasarjanz combines rhythmic incisiveness with almost period starchiness tonally and stylistically. But her vibrant sense of and fidelity to what she obviously believes to be the music's rhetoric combine to make her reading of Mozart commanding and, ultimately, convincing — especially in the first movement, in which she reveals an unsuspected urgency. Not so suave in Mozart as Arthur Grumiaux or so sharply focused on detail as Catherine Mackintosh, she combines the best aspects of both approaches and deserves on the basis of this reading to be mentioned alongside them on any shortlist of Mozart interpreters.

The live performances of Beethoven's and Brahms's sonatas with pianist Bruno F. Saladin come from 1964, approximately the same date as the studio recording of Mozart. Caught at a greater distance in them, her tone loses some of its edge and her reading correspondingly loses some of its detail, but there's enough left for any normal recorded sound. Her reading of the “Kreutzer” Sonata takes a very different tack than that of Jascha Heifetz or Zino Francescatti, whose performances set a sort of benchmark in white-hot intensity; Bagdasarjanz seems from the first notes of the introduction warm rather than hot. Her reading, for example, of what I’ve called the Janissary theme doesn't rollick with whipped-up frenzy, but presents a different and, again, as in Mozart, a convincing, though kinder and gentler, view. Not that the reading lacks the passion that might inspire a novel, but it's diverted through calmer and more amiable streams. Bagdasarjanz plays the theme of the variation movement with a warmth, subtlety, and geniality that sound like Fritz Kreisler's — except that Kreisler himself played the theme more straightforwardly and with greater rhythmic springiness. That geniality continues through the first two variations (Bagdasarjanz sounds particularly silvery in the second of them), but she and Saladin dim the lights for the minore variation. The following maggiore serves in this reading almost as a Hegelian synthesis of the preceding two, while the Molto adagio sums everything up in a penetrating synopsis. If the somewhat slow tempo at the finale's opening makes the reading sound less urgent at its outset, her tonal weight and general storminess still generate plenty of driving force.

Bagdasarjanz soars in the first movement of Brahms's sonata; her reading never seems undesirably light in weight or tone (an analogous predication in the terms of scholastic philosophy). In fact, her tone, though pure and mercurial in the upper registers, remains almost seductively dusky in the lower ones. In the slow movement's opening passages, it oozes with honeyed richness. Only very occasionally does security falter in the third movement (but it's a live recording); on the other hand, the brisk reading of the finale sweeps everything before it with concerto-like massiveness.

Music education, Paris, France, 2012
MOZART-BEETHOVEN-BRAHMS. VDE Gallo (www.vdegallo.ch) : CD 1352. TT : 78'27.
Violinist Ursula Bagdasarjanz is a concert performer and pedagogue in Switzerland. She has produced a collection of CDs containing radio and digitally remastered recordings (2008–2011) and a live recording. In this fifth volume, accompanied by pianist Luciano Sgrizzi, she performs Mozart's Sonata in G Major, K. 302 (1963, Studio Lugano). With pianist Bruno F. Saladin, she performs Beethoven's Sonata in A Major, op. 47, and Brahms's Sonata in D Minor, op. 108, recorded live in 1964.

Codex Flores, 29 January 2013.
Translation of the article on Ursula Bagdasarjanz on © www.codexflores.ch of 29.01.2013

Ursula Bagdasarjanz on "MusicWeb International, March 2013
Othmar Schoeck CD (Vol. 2 & Vol. 3) has been reviewed on MusicWeb International

Classical Reissue Reviews, published on April 8, 2013, audad.com 2013/04
Volume two of the survey of Othmar Schoeck's violin works enjoys the artful collaboration of two well-matched musicians, including violinist Bagdasarjanz and the composer's daughter at the keyboard.
Recension by Gary Lemco

Ursula Bagdasarjanz on "MusicWeb International, May 2013
Johann Sebastian Bach, Pietro Nardini, Wolfgang Amadeus Mozart, Béla Bartók CD (Vol. 1) has been reviewed on MusicWeb International

Ursula Bagdasarjanz on "Audiophile Edition, June 2013
Schoek Violin Concerto in B-flat Major, Op. 21 "Quasi una fantasia"; GLAZUNOV: Violin Concerto in A Minor, Op. 82 – Ursala Bagdasarjanz, violin/ Radiochestra Lugano/ Francesco d'Avalos (Schoeck)/Leopoldo Casella (Glazunov) – Gallo CD-1250, 56:40 [Distr. by Albany] ****
Recension by Gary Lemco

Ursula Bagdasarjanz on "Audiophile Edition, July 2013
Ursula Bagdasarjanz, violin – "Sept Poesies pour Violon et Piano" – Gallo CD-1251, 53:51 [Distr. by Albany] ****
The last of the Gallo edition given to violin virtuoso Bagdasarjanz allows us to savour her gifts as a stylish performer and gifted composer in her own right.
Recension by Gary Lemco

Ursula Bagdasarjanz, violin, special Tribute Music Treasury Show, DJ: Glemco, Stanford University, CA, Thursday, 22 August 2013 8 pm-10 pm
Handel: Violin Sonata in F Major (album: Ursula Bagdasarjanz: Sept Poesies, Gallo)
Bartók: First Rhapsody for Violin and Piano (album: Ursula Bagdasarjanz violin, Gallo)
Ursula Bagdasarjanz: 3 Pieces (album: Ursula Bagdasarjanz: Sept Poesies, Gallo)
Bach: Solo Sonata in A Minor, BWV 1003 (album: Ursula Bagdasarjanz violin, Gallo)
Nardini: Violin Sonata in D Major (album: Ursula Bagdasarjanz violin, Gallo)
Mozart:Violin Sonata in G Major, K. 301, excerpt (album: Ursula Bagdasarjanz violin, Gallo)
Schoeck: Violin Concerto in B-flat Major, Op. 21 (album: Ursula Bagdasarjanz violin, Gallo)

Ursula Bagdasarjanz on "MusicWeb International, September 2013
Ursula Bagdasarjanz CD (Vol. 4) has been reviewed on MusicWeb International

Ursula Bagdasarjanz featured in the "Herrliberg calendar"
The Language of Passion. Ursula Bagdasarjanz and the Violin.

February 2020, Ursula Bagdasarjanz honoured by the "special Tribute Music Treasury Show" of Stanford University.
Please click here.
