= Violin Concerto (Previn) =

Violin concerto by André Previn

- Anne-Sophie
- by André Previn
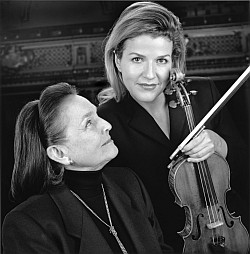
- Anne-Sophie Mutter (right), the dedicatee and first soloist, in 2007 with Aida Stucki
- Composed: 2001
- Movements: 3

Premiere
- Date: 14 March 2002
- Location: Boston
- Conductor: André Previn
- Performers: Anne-Sophie Mutter; Boston Symphony Orchestra

The Concerto for Violin and Orchestra "Anne-Sophie" is a violin concerto by André Previn. It was composed in 2001 by request of the Boston Symphony Orchestra for Anne-Sophie Mutter. Previn conducted the first performance in March 2002 in Boston. The same performers recorded the work in 2003, and received a Grammy Award for it in 2005.

== History ==
Previn composed the violin concerto in 2001 on a commission from the Boston Symphony Orchestra. He wrote the solo part with violinist Anne-Sophie Mutter in mind. Previn called it "Anne-Sophie" in honour of the soloist who was to become his wife, and it has been described as a musical "love letter" and an "engagement present". The world premiere was on 14 March 2002, conducted by the composer. The couple married in August that year. They made a recording released in 2003, and toured Europe with the Oslo Philharmonic, including a concert of The Proms at the Royal Albert Hall on 30 August 2004. They divorced in 2006.

== Structure and music ==
The concerto is in three movements:

1. Moderato
2. Cadenza – Slowly
3. Andante ("from a train in Germany")

Unusually, the movements increase in length. A typical performance lasts forty minutes. A reviewer for Gramophone noted that the first movement showed, like Korngold's Violin Concerto which Mutter and Previn had performed together, "sweetly nostalgic cinemascope romanticism". The contrasting second movement is desolate in character, described by Previn as "more barren and acidulous" than the outer movements. The third movement, subtitled "from a train in Germany", includes the composer's memories of a train ride when he was a boy living in Germany, including variations of the children's song "Wenn ich ein Vöglein wär". A reviewer noted the movement's humour and "ecstatic melodic flights", ending "darkly beautiful". The composer used orchestral colours, but consistently serving the soloist.

== Recording ==
The Concerto was recorded by the performers of the premiere, released by Deutsche Grammophon in 2003, coupled with Leonard Bernstein's 1954 Serenade after Plato's "Symposium" for solo violin, string orchestra, harp and percussion, with Mutter and the London Philharmonic Orchestra. A reviewer compared the first movements to concertos by Korngold and Prokofiev. Mutter's playing has been described as dancing "through the thorniest passages" and giving "a silky sheen to even the most stratospherically placed notes", while the orchestra plays "with an ideal mixture of sumptuousness and delicacy".

== Legacy ==
Previn's violin concerto was one of the composer's most successful works. The recording received the Grammy Award in the category "instrumental soloist performance with orchestra" in 2004. Shortly before Previn's death in February 2019, Mutter had embarked on a recital tour of the United States, including the concerto in her performance.
