= Violin Concerto No. 2 (Williams) =

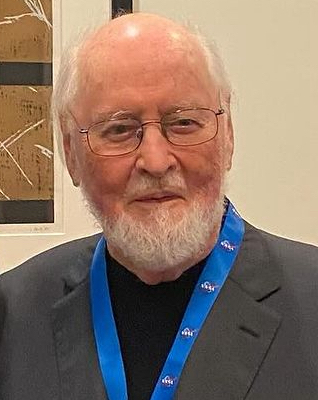
John Williams in 2024

John Williams's Violin Concerto No. 2 was commissioned by the violinist Anne-Sophie Mutter. The piece was given its world premiere by Mutter and the Boston Symphony Orchestra conducted by Williams at Tanglewood, on July 24, 2021.

== Composition ==
=== Structure ===
The concerto has a duration of roughly 34 minutes and is cast in four movements:

1. Prologue
2. Rounds
3. Dactyls
4. Epilogue

=== Instrumentation ===
The score calls for solo violin and an orchestra comprising three flutes (3rd doubling alto flute and piccolo), three oboes (3rd doubling English horn), three clarinets (3rd doubling bass clarinet), three bassoons (3rd doubling contrabassoon), four horns, three trumpets, three trombones, tuba, timpani, percussion (glockenspiel, xylophone, vibraphone, marimba, chimes, large and small triangles, high and medium sizzle cymbals, bright cymbal, four suspended cymbals, choke cymbal, three tam-tams, high slapsticks, two tambourines, small ratchet, Japanese woodblocks, tuned drums, bass drum, taiko), harp, piano, celesta, and strings.

== Reception ==
The concerto has been generally praised by music critics. Michael Beek of BBC Music Magazine wrote, "That this second violin concerto feels somehow more youthful than the first is interesting, given the fact Williams was fast approaching 90 when he finished it. Its vigour can be put down to experience of course, a sense of having less to prove perhaps, but it also responds to Mutter's own dexterity and skill with an instrument the composer frankly adores. It's a hugely expressive, deeply atmospheric four-movement work and, like all his concertos, quite far removed from the thematic narrative music we're all so familiar with. That's not to say Williams doesn't paint a vivid picture, and there's plenty of orchestral drama." Edward Seckerson of Gramophone similarly described the piece as "virtuoso and then some, and as such there are stretches of music that you might not recognise as being by Williams at all. In that regard this is music that might not be as easy to love but is infectious by virtue of its creative energy, the sparks of interaction generated between player and composer and the gamesmanship it engenders."

Richard Fairman of the Financial Times was slightly more critical of the work, however, remarking, "The concerto emerges from a cosmic murmur leading to an improvisatory violin solo and fades away, 35 minutes later, in a haunting violin threnody that suggests healing and renewal. What happens in between is more fitfully inspiring, the energetic passages for the soloist especially tending to generate more heat than light. The Prologue does not hang together, whereas 'Rounds', the second movement, is enchanting from first to last." A.Z. Madonna of The Boston Globe similarly remarked:

No one could mistake this kitchen-sink concerto for film music. Many of Williams's signature elements (sonic textures deceptively simple in their fullness, distinctive and evocative timbres) were present in abundance, so much so that I sometimes felt like I was listening to several of his scores at the same time. However, absent were the memorable melodies that form the foundation of his most enduring works. At times, this approach was fascinating — almost a glimpse of what might have been had Williams's career played out in the concert hall rather than on the silver screen. More often, I noticed myself longing for leitmotifs.

== Recordings ==
A recording of the concerto performed by Mutter and the Boston Symphony Orchestra conducted by Williams and recorded at Symphony Hall in Boston was released through Deutsche Grammophon in June 2022.

== See also ==
- List of compositions by John Williams
