= Lambert Orkis =

American pianist (born 1946)

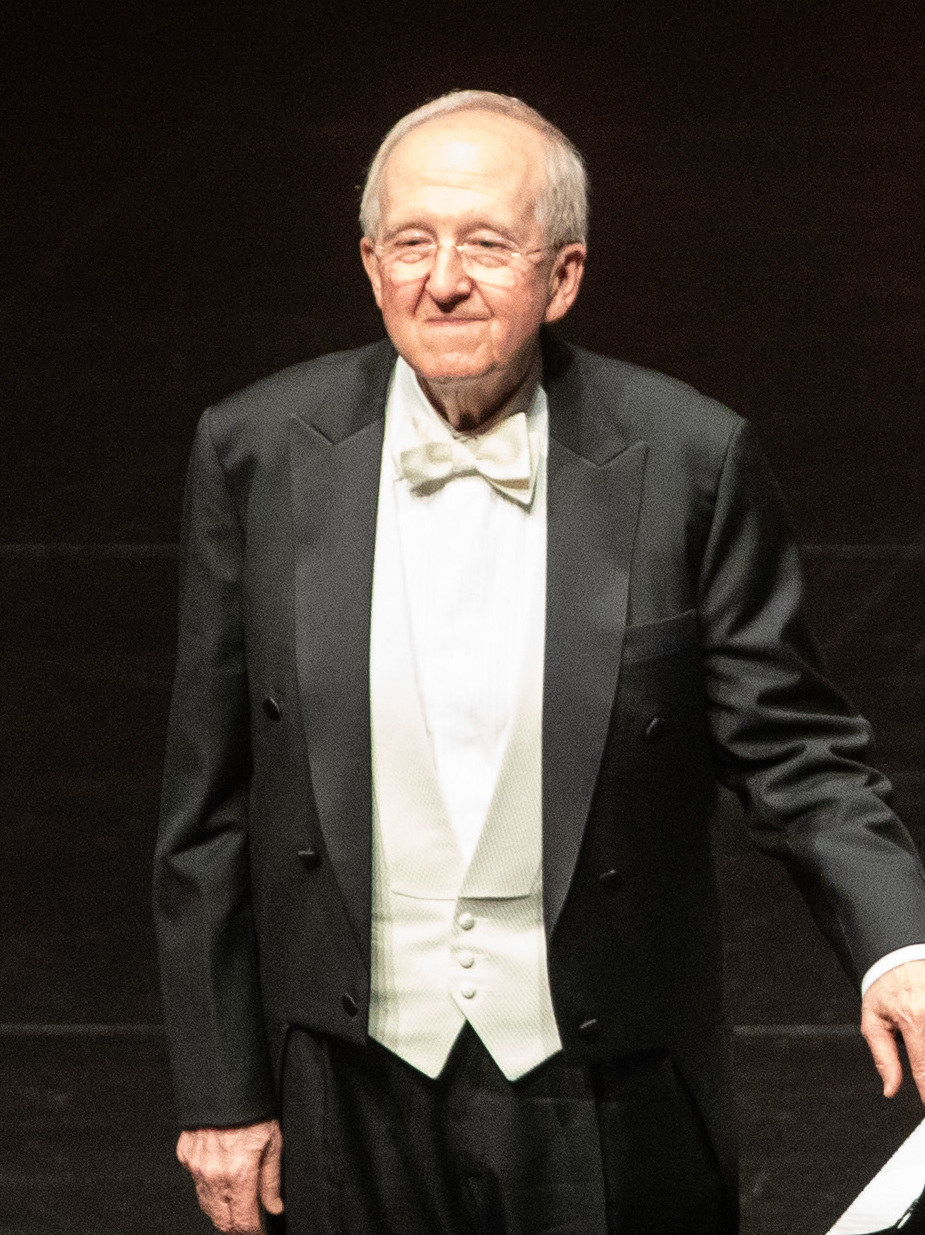
- Lambert Orkis, 2021

Background information
- Origin: Philadelphia
- Genres: Classical music
- Occupation: Pianist

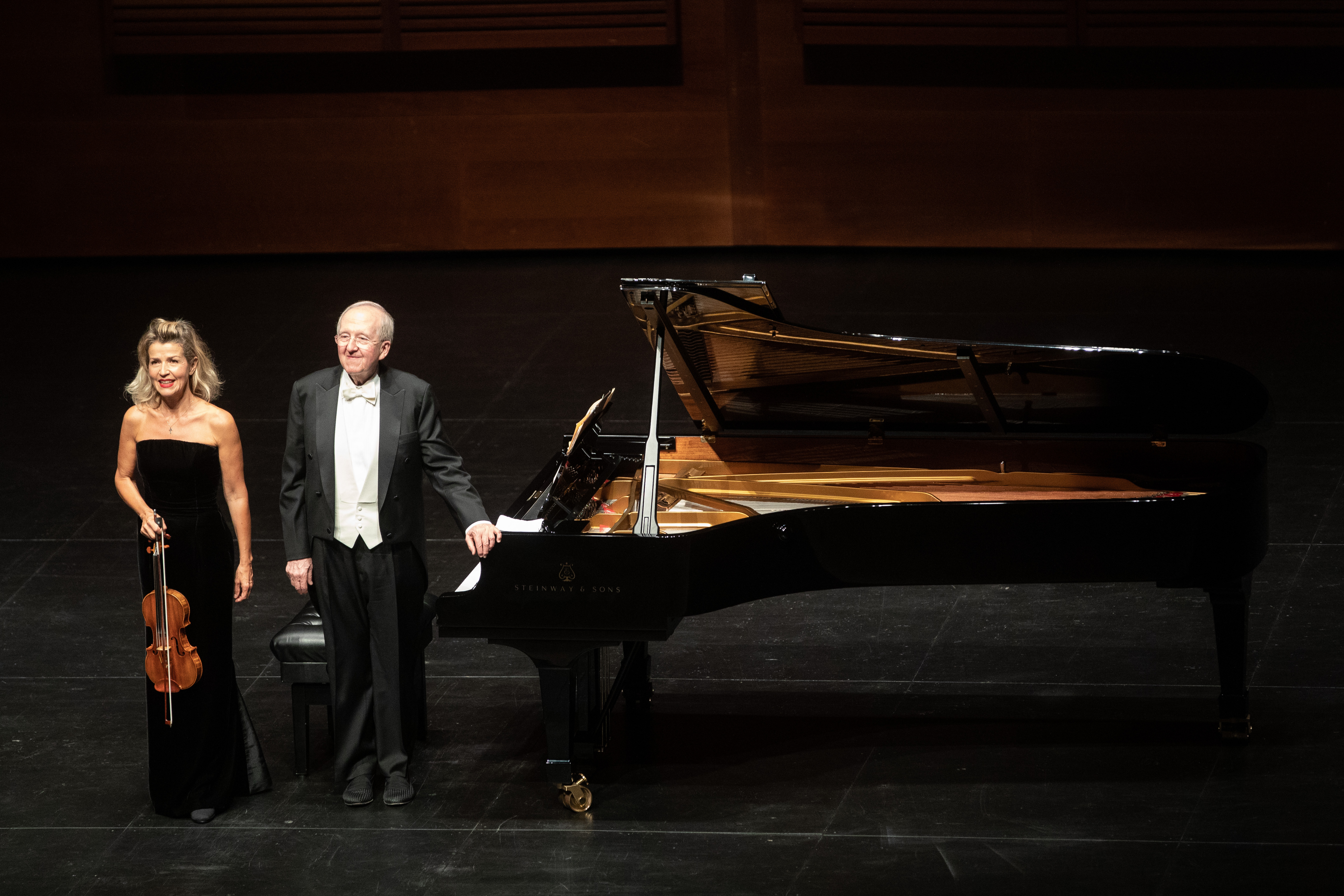
Anne-Sophie Mutter with Orkis (2021)

Lambert Orkis (born 1946, Philadelphia) is an American classical pianist. His career has been based on many differing roles: ranging from being the collaborative pianist for Anne-Sophie Mutter for works of piano and violin chamber music since 1988 (mainly containing sonatas for violin and piano by Beethoven, Mozart, Brahms, and Schubert). In 2000, the duo was honored by a Grammy Award for their interpretation of the Beethoven violin sonatas.

For eleven years, Orkis had also collaborated with the famous cellist (and conductor) Mstislav Rostropovich on chamber music recitals. From this collaboration, Rostropovich created a permanent position for Orkis, appointing him as first piano instrumentalist member of the National Symphony Orchestra during his tenure as a chief conductor in Washington, D.C.

A third specialty of Lambert Orkis are his performances on period instruments but he is also a specialist in contemporary music, having collaborated with the cellists Lynn Harrell, Anner Bylsma and Daniel Müller-Schott, as well as with the violinists Julian Rachlin and Jaap Schroeder. With the period-instrument Castle Trio (violinist Marilyn McDonald and cellist Kenneth Slowik), he has recorded the complete Beethoven trios, plus works of Schubert, Clara Schumann, Robert Schumann, Dvořák, and Smetana. Contemporary composers such as George Crumb, Richard Wernick and James Primrosch have written piano compositions especially for him.

Lambert Orkis is professor of piano of the Boyer College of Music and Dance at Temple University in Philadelphia.
