= Anne-Sophie Mutter =

German violinist (born 1963)

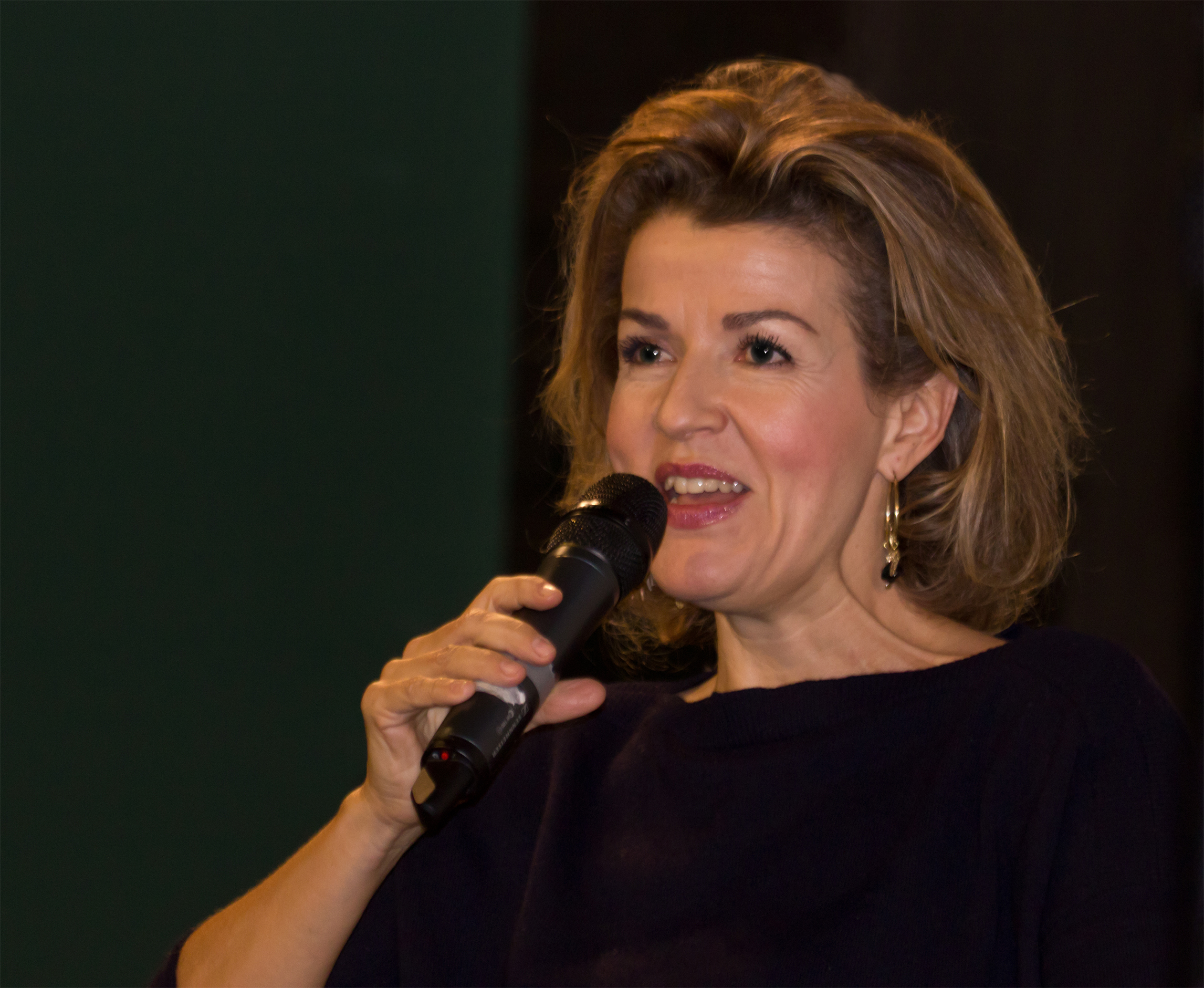
- Mutter in 2019
- Born: 29 June 1963 (age 63); Rheinfelden, Baden-Württemberg, Germany
- Occupation: Violinist
- Years active: 1976–present
- Spouses: Detlef Wunderlich (m. 1989; died 1995) André Previn (m. 2002; div. 2006)
- Children: 2
- Musical career
- Genre: Classical
- Instruments: Emiliani Stradivarius 1703; Lord Dunn-Raven Stradivarius 1710
- Labels: Deutsche Grammophon; EMI Classics; Sony Classical
- Website: www.anne-sophie-mutter.de

Anne-Sophie Mutter (born 29 June 1963) is a German violinist. Born in Rheinfelden, Baden-Württemberg and raised in the nearby town Wehr, Mutter began playing the violin aged five and pursued further studies in Germany and Switzerland. She was supported early in her career by Herbert von Karajan, made her orchestral debut with the Berlin Philharmonic in 1977, and rose to international prominence in the early 1980s. She has since performed as a soloist with leading orchestras worldwide and has recorded more than 50 albums, mostly with the Deutsche Grammophon label, earning four Grammy Awards, two ECHO Klassik awards, two Opus Klassik awards, and a Grand Prix du Disque. Despite her success and fame in the 1980s, Mutter's interpretive style often divides critics.

Mutter's repertoire includes traditional classical violin works from the Baroque period to the 20th century, but she is particularly known for performing, recording, and commissioning new works by contemporary composers. As an advocate of contemporary music, she has had several works composed especially for her, by Thomas Adès, Unsuk Chin, Sebastian Currier, Henri Dutilleux, Sofia Gubaidulina, Witold Lutosławski, Norbert Moret, Krzysztof Penderecki, André Previn, Wolfgang Rihm, Jörg Widmann, Max Richter, and John Williams. Over the years, Mutter has repeatedly collaborated with and made recordings with conductors such as Herbert von Karajan, André Previn, Seiji Ozawa, Daniel Barenboim, James Levine, Kurt Masur, Simon Rattle, Manfred Honeck, Alan Gilbert and John Williams, as well as with her longtime recital partner, pianist Lambert Orkis.

Mutter has received numerous international awards, including the Ernst von Siemens Music Prize (2008), the Polar Music Prize (2019), the Grand Decoration of Honour of Austria (2007), the Grand Cross Order of Merit of the Federal Republic of Germany (2009), France's Legion of Honour (2009), Spain's Gold Medal of Merit in the Fine Arts (2016), Romania's Grand Cross National Order of Merit (2017), Poland's Gold Medal for Merit to Culture – Gloria Artis (2018), Japan's Praemium Imperiale (2019), and holds honorary memberships at the Royal Academy of Music (1986) and American Academy of Arts and Sciences (2013).

Mutter founded the Association of Friends of the Anne-Sophie Mutter Foundation e.V. in 1997 and established the Anne-Sophie Mutter Foundation in 2008, both dedicated to supporting young string musicians. She frequently gives benefit concerts and was the president of the German Cancer Aid from 2021 to 2025.

== Early life ==
Mutter was born in the German town of Rheinfelden, Baden-Württemberg. Her parents were Karl Wilhelm Mutter and Gerlinde Mutter and she was raised with two older brothers. While Mutter's father was a journalist who edited a newspaper in Baden-Württemberg, her mother was the first woman in her family to graduate from college. Although no one in the home played a musical instrument, all were passionate about classical music.

Mutter began piano lessons at age five but after a few months switched to the violin after listening to an album of the Mendelssohn and Beethoven violin concertos that her parents had given to each other as an engagement present. At age six, after only one year of violin lessons, Mutter won the National Music Prize, and in 1972 she gave her first concert, with the then 343-year-old Musikkollegium Winterthur.

Inspired by another recording, of violinist Yehudi Menuhin with Wilhelm Furtwängler, she then began studying with Erna Honigberger, a pupil of Carl Flesch; and when Honigberger died, in 1974, she continued with Aida Stucki, also a former student of Flesch, at the Winterthur Conservatory.

== Career ==
=== 1970s–1980s ===
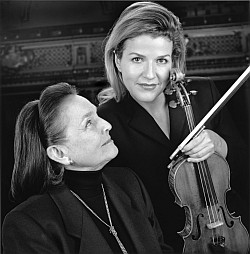
Mutter with Aida Stucki

Mutter's playing began to receive wider attention and she stopped attending school to devote herself full time to music. At only 13 years old, she made her public recital debut on August 23, 1976 at the Lucerne Festival, performing works by Tartini, Bach, de Falla, Paganini, and de Sarasate. Conductor Herbert von Karajan heard Mutter play at the Lucerne Festival and arranged for her to perform at The Salzburg Whitsun Festival, where she debuted with the Berlin Philharmonic on May 29, 1977 in a performance of Mozart's Violin Concerto No. 3. In the summer of 1977, she made her debut at the Salzburg Festival, performing Mozart's Violin Concerto No. 2 with the Mozarteum Orchestra Salzburg. Critics praised the level of maturity in Mutter's performances, with one reviewer of Die Welt writing, "She played it ravishingly, and above all, she did not play it at all like a child prodigy. Her technique is fully mature."

At the age of 15, Mutter made her debut recording in 1978, performing Mozart's Third and Fifth violin concerti with Karajan and the Berlin Philharmonic. The recording received France's prestigious Grand Prix International du Disque the following year. In the 1980s, Mutter went on to record the Brahms, Beethoven, Mendelssohn, and Bruch violin concertos with Karajan and the Berlin Philharmonic, all released on the Deutsche Gramophone label. The Mendelssohn and Bruch recording won Tokyo's Record Academy Prize in 1981, with one critic from Gramophone writing "In the Mendelssohn Mutter is even more successful. She plays with the most natural spontaneity, giving the listener a feeling of coming to the work anew."

Mutter started to perform outside Europe in the early 1980s. In 1980, Mutter made her American debut with the New York Philharmonic playing Mendelssohn's Violin Concerto under Zubin Mehta. That same year, she also debuted with the Chicago Symphony Orchestra performing Beethoven's Romance in G major and Mozart's Third Violin Concerto under Georg Solti, and with the National Symphony Orchestra playing Mozart's Third Violin Concerto under Mstislav Rostropovich. The following year Mutter made her debut at Carnegie Hall playing Mozart's Fifth Violin Concerto with the Philadelphia Orchestra under Riccardo Muti, and made her debut with the Boston Symphony Orchestra performing Bruch's Violin Concerto under Seiji Ozawa in 1983. Mutter's Japanese debut was in Tokyo (1981) with the Berlin Philharmonic under Karajan, followed by her Russian debut in Moscow (1985).

Three years after her debut with the London Symphony Orchestra in 1980, in which she played Mendelssohn's Violin Concerto under Claudio Abbado, Mutter was named honorary President of Oxford University's Mozart Society. In 1985, at the age of 22, she was made an honorary fellow of the Royal Academy of Music (London), appointed head of its faculty of international violin studies, and in 1986 became an honorary member.

During the 1980s, Mutter appeared at the Salzburg Festival five times with Herbert von Karajan. She also performed the Beethoven Triple Concerto with Yo-Yo Ma and Mark Zeltser under Karajan in 1978 and later recorded the concerto with the same musicians for Deutsche Grammophone. Additionally, Mutter recorded the Tchaikovsky Violin Concerto with the Vienna Philharmonic and Karajan at the 1988 Salzburg Festival. Since her debut at the Festival, she has been a frequent guest, appearing more than thirty times both with orchestras and as a recitalist.

Beginning in the late 1980s, Mutter expanded her repertoire and devoted herself more to contemporary works, a focus that would become a significant component of her career. In 1986, Mutter premiered Witold Lutosławski's Chain 2, Dialogue for Violin and Orchestra, with the Zurich Collegium Musicum. Norbert Moret composed his Violin Concert En rêve for Mutter in 1988.

In 1988, she also made a grand tour of Canada and the United States, performing as a soloist with orchestras and giving solo recitals with pianist Lambert Orkis. Mutter made her recital debuts in New York (at Carnegie Hall), Washington, D.C., Los Angeles, San Francisco, Montreal, Toronto, and other cities, and also debuted with the San Francisco Symphony Orchestra. She premiered works by Krzysztof Penderecki and André Previn, in addition to performing classical repertoire such as Beethoven's Violin Concerto and violin sonatas by Beethoven, Brahms, Franck, and Tartini.

=== 1990s ===
By the 1990s, Mutter had established herself as an international star, transitioning from Wunderkind to mature artist The press described her as a "master of the violin" and "musician of near peerless virtuosity and unimpeachable integrity," with critics noting her glamorous image. One author of Der Spiegel wrote in regards to Mutter's rise to fame: "In the meantime, the entire classical music world knows these tones and this musical master: Anne-Sophie Mutter, now 25, is probably the only world star made in Germany in today's instrumentalist trade and the first violinist from [Germany] who can keep up with the world's violin standard. After Dietrich Fischer-Dieskau's flight of fancy, no other serious musician from Germany – gender notwithstanding – has succeeded in rising more quickly from the first floor to the penthouse of the international guild of interpreters. In her line of work she is at the top: Frau Fiddler on the roof."

In the 1990s, Mutter premiered Wolfgang Rihm's Gesungene Zeit (1992), Sebastian Currier's Aftersong (1994) and Krzysztof Penderecki's Violin Concert No. 2 Metamorphosen (1995). That same decade, Mutter released some of her best-selling albums, including Carmen Fantasie with James Levine and the Vienna Philharmonic (1993) and Vivaldi's Four Seasons with Karajan and the Vienna Philharmonic (recorded in 1984, published in 1994) and another Vivaldi's Four Seasons album with the Trondheim Soloists (1999).

In 1998 she played and recorded for CD and DVD the complete set of Beethoven's Violin Sonatas (released 1999), accompanied by Lambert Orkis; these were broadcast on television in many countries. The recording of the sonatas received a Grammy Award for Best Chamber Music Performance. Mutter devoted an entire year to performing all ten of Beethoven's violin sonatas in the "Beethoven: Face to Face" tour in cities throughout North America and Europe, including additional modern pieces. Music critic Anthony Tommasini of the New York Times wrote on a concert of the Beethoven tour, "Ms. Mutter's playing had its trademark qualities: rich yet focused tone, striking varieties of sound, articulate yet supple rhythmic play. But her increasing work in recent years with living composers has brought a new kind of intellectual energy to her playing, for she was particularly attentive to the bold turns in this youthful music."

=== 2000s ===
With the turn of the century, Mutter continued supporting new music and began collaborating with composer and conductor André Previn, who dedicated several works to Mutter. Mutter premiered a Tango Song and Dance in 2002, which Previn composed for her. Mutter also gave the first permanence and recording of Previn's Violin Concerto with the Boston Symphony Orchestra the same year, of which the recording became a critical success. Mutter toured with orchestras under the direction of Previn, performing his concerto and later premiering Previn's double concerto for violin and contrabass in 2007 with Roman Patkoló. Two years later, she premiered his Second Piano Trio with Lynn Harrell and Previn and Concerto for Violin and Viola with Yuri Bashmet.

Other contemporary works dedicated to Mutter that she premiered included Henri Dutilleux's Nocturne for violin and orchestra Sur le même accord (2002) under Kurt Masur conducting the London Philharmonic Orchestra and Sofia Gubaidulina's violin concerto (2007) under Sir Simon Rattle with the Berlin Philharmonic.

For Mozart's 250th Anniversary from 2005 to 2006, Mutter toured throughout Europe, North America, and Asia, including China, Japan, Korea, and Taiwan, performing Mozart's complete Violin Concertos, the Sinfonia Concertante for Violin, Viola and Orchestra and complete Piano Trios. Mutter performed with Lambert Orkis and André Previn as pianists. Five DVD and CD recordings containing the works performed on tour and the complete Violin sonatas of Mozart were released.

In October 2006, on French television, Mutter appeared to indicate that she would be retiring when she turned 45, in 2008. However the following month she said that her words were "misinterpreted" and that she would continue to play as long as she felt she could "bring anything new, anything important, anything different to music".

To mark the bicentenary of Mendelssohn's birth, Mutter rerecorded Mendelssohn's violin concerto with Kurt Masur and the Leipzig Gewandhaus Orchestra and his Piano Trio No. 1 with Lynn Harrell and André Previn in 2009. Mutter also gave live performances of the concerto in San Francisco, New York, London and Oslo.

=== 2010s ===
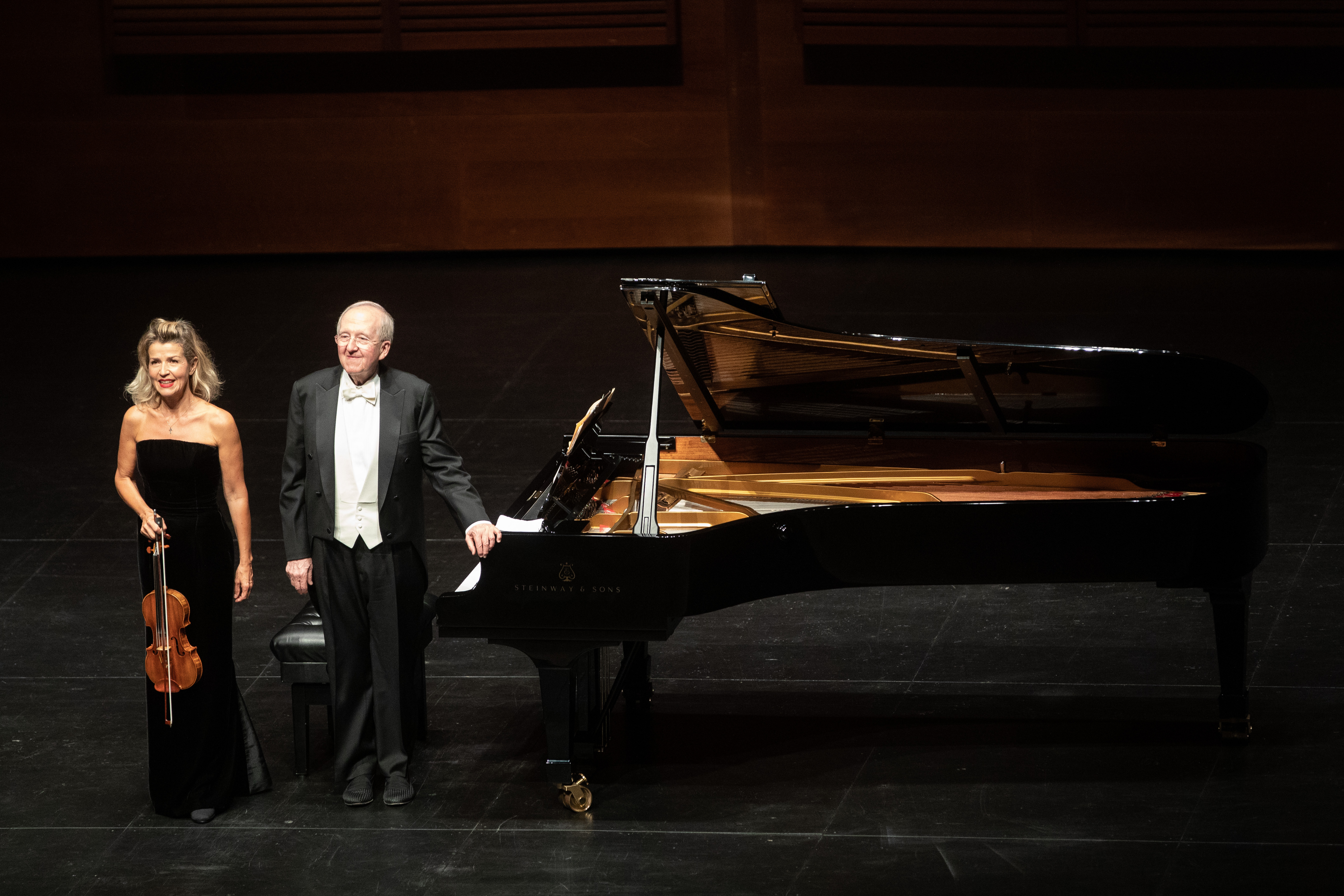
Mutter with Lambert Orkis (2021)

Mutter performed classical and contemporary works during the 2010s, touring Europe, North America, Asia, South America, and Australia. For her yearly tours and performances, she continued her collaborations with Lambert Orkis and performed the major concertos of the classical repertoire. She premiered Wolfgang Rihm's "Lichtes Spiel" with the New York Philharmonic and "Dyade" with double bass player Roman Patkoló in 2010 and Sebastian Currier's "Time Machines" with the New York Philharmonic conducted by Alan Gilbert in 2011 to critical acclaim. In 2010 and 2011, Mutter was the Mary and James G. Wallach Artist-in-Residence at the New York Philharmonic.

In 2011, Mutter established the Mutter Virtuosi, composed of select students and graduates of the Anne-Sophie Mutter Foundation (established 2008) that perform with Mutter. The chamber ensemble has toured multiple times throughout different continents in the 2010s, performing modern works and classics such as Vivaldi's Four Seasons. As part of Deutsche Grammophon's series to introduce classical music to broader audiences, Mutter and the Mutter Virtuosi performed works by Bach, Vivaldi, Gershwin and John Williams in a night club at Berlin's venue Neue Heimat in 2015. The performance was recorded for The Club Album – Live from the Yellow Lounge. Mutter was the soloist for the Berlin Philharmonic's 2015 New Year Eve's concert under Sir Simon Rattle.

Mutter gave the world premiere of Previn's "Violin Concerto no. 2 for Violin and String Orchestra with the Trondheim Soloists in 2012, the premier of Sebastian Currier's "Ringtone Variations" for violin and double bass in 2013, and the premiere of John Williams' Markings for solo violin, strings and harp with the Boston Symphony Orchestra under Andris Nelsons in 2017. In 2018, Mutter premiered Previn's The Fifth Season, Krzysztof Penderecki's Sonata for Violin and Piano No. 2, and his Duo concertante per violino e contrabbasso.

In 2018, Mutter gave a concert with pianist Lang Lang titled the Berlin Concert with the Staatskapelle Berlin under Manfred Honeck for the 120 Anniversary of Deutsche Grammophon. For the anniversary, Mutter also gave concerts in Seoul, South Korea, and Tokyo, Japan. The following year, Mutter performed for the 20th anniversary of the Oxford Philharmonic Orchestra with Maxim Vengerov and Martha Argerich.

In 2019, Mutter joined John Williams to perform Williams' works for solo violin and orchestra, titled "Across The Stars". The tour and album contained works from Williams' film scores, with such notable pieces as the Star Wars themes, Rey and Yoda, and Hedwig's Theme from Harry Potter. The same year, Mutter toured Europe with the West–Eastern Divan Orchestra, playing Beethoven's Triple Concerto with Daniel Barenboim and Yo-Yo Ma. The tour included stops in Buenos Aires and Berlin, and resulted in the release of a CD by Deutsche Grammophon. In March 2019, Mutter premiered Sebastian Currier's Ghost Trio with Daniel Müller-Schott and Lambert Orkis at Carnegie Hall.

In September 2019, Mutter stopped during a performance of Beethoven's Violin Concerto with the Cincinnati Symphony Orchestra to ask a cellphone user to stop recording. The incident received significant press coverage and refueled debates about concert cellphone etiquette.

=== 2020–present ===
Mutter has recently premiered several pieces that have been dedicated to her, including Jörg Widmann's string quartet Studie über Beethoven in Tokyo (2020), John Williams' Concerto for Violin and Orchestra No. 2 in Tanglewood with the Boston Symphony Orchestra (2021), Unsuk Chin's violin duet Gran Cadenza (2021) in Regensburg with violinist Ye-Eun Choi and Thomas Adès' work for violin and orchestra Air – Homage to Sibelius (2022) at the Lucerne Festival with the Lucerne Festival Contemporary Orchestra.

Mutter's 2023 Virtuosi tour included works by Vivaldi and Bach and by Joseph Bologne in an effort to revive the composer's legacy. In 2023, Mutter also performed chamber pieces by Beethoven, Brahms, Currier and Schuman with Lambert Orkis and Maximilians Hornung. Mutter continued to premiere Kurrier’s “Ghost Trio” and Previn’s “Nonet” in several European countries and continued performances of William’s Violin Concerto no. 2 alongside some of his film scores.

In January 2024, Mutter gave the UK premiere of William’s Violin Concerto No. 2 with the London Philharmonic Orchestra. In the spring of that year, Mutter toured East Asia with Lambert Orkis, performing works by Mozart, Respighi, Schumann and Schubert. Mutter performed core violin concertos in concert series with the West-Eastern Divan Orchestra under Daniel Barenboim, the Pittsburgh Symphony Orchestra under Manfred Honeck, the National Danish Symphony Orchestra and the London Philharmonic.

In 2025, Mutter performed Beethoven and Tchaikovsky Trios with Yefim Bronfman and Pablo Ferrández in US and German cities. Mutter resumed the concerts series “Across the Stars” featuring various compositions by John Williams, but with the Royal Philharmonic Orchestra under Vasily Petrenko. On October 25, 2025, Mutter gave the premieres of „Three Dances” for violin and orchestra by Max Richter and "When the world was Waltzing" by John Williams in a 200th anniversary concert for Johann Strauss with the Vienna Philharmonic under Manfred Honeck at the Vienna Musikverein.

== Repertoire ==
Mutter's works include traditional classic pieces that are part of the violin repertoire. Mutter has performed and made recordings of the major violin concertos by Bach, Bartók, Berg, Brahms, Bruch, Beethoven, Dvořák, Mendelssohn, Mozart, Sibelius, Tchaikovsky, and Vivaldi. Her repertoire includes performances and recordings of the double and triple concertos by Brahms and Beethoven, violin romances by Beethoven, Bruch, and Dvořák, and popular orchestral works by Massenet, Sarasate, and Saint Saëns, and standard solo works by Bach and Paganini. Part of her repertoire encompasses chamber works such as the complete violin sonatas by Beethoven, Brahms, and Mozart, other sonatas by Bartók, Franck, Mendelssohn, Prokofiev and Tartini, trios by Beethoven and Mozart, and string quartets by Mozart, Beethoven and Haydn, and Schubert's Trout Quintet and Fantasy in C Major.

Though her repertoire includes many classical works, Mutter is particularly known for her performances of contemporary music. Several pieces have been specially written for or dedicated to her, including Henri Dutilleux's Sur le même accord, Krzysztof Penderecki's Second Violin Concerto, Witold Lutosławski's Chain 2 and the orchestral version of Partita, and Wolfgang Rihm's Gesungene Zeit ("Time Chant"), Lichtes Spiel, and Dyade and Sofia Gubaidulina's Violin Concerto No. 2 "In tempus praesens," among others. Mutter premiered André Previn's Violin Concerto "Anne-Sophie", whose recording received a Grammy Award. Mutter's recordings of Penderecki's Violin Concerto No. 2, Metamorphosen, and Rihm's Time Chant also received Grammy Awards.

World renowned film score composer and five times Academy Awards winner John Williams composed original music for her, including a 2017 pièce for violin, strings and harp called "Markings", and in 2019 arrangements for violin and orchestra of movie themes composed by him Across the Stars, recorded by Mutter and Williams with the Recording Arts Orchestra of Los Angeles. Mutter commissioned Williams' second violin concerto, recorded in 2022 by Mutter and the Boston Symphony Orchestra with Williams conducting. Mutter also appeared as soloist in John Williams' debut concert with the Wiener Philharmoniker on 28 and 29 January 2020, recorded by Deutsche Grammophon and released in the live album "John Williams in Vienna", which became the best-selling album of orchestral music in 2020.

== Playing style and reception ==
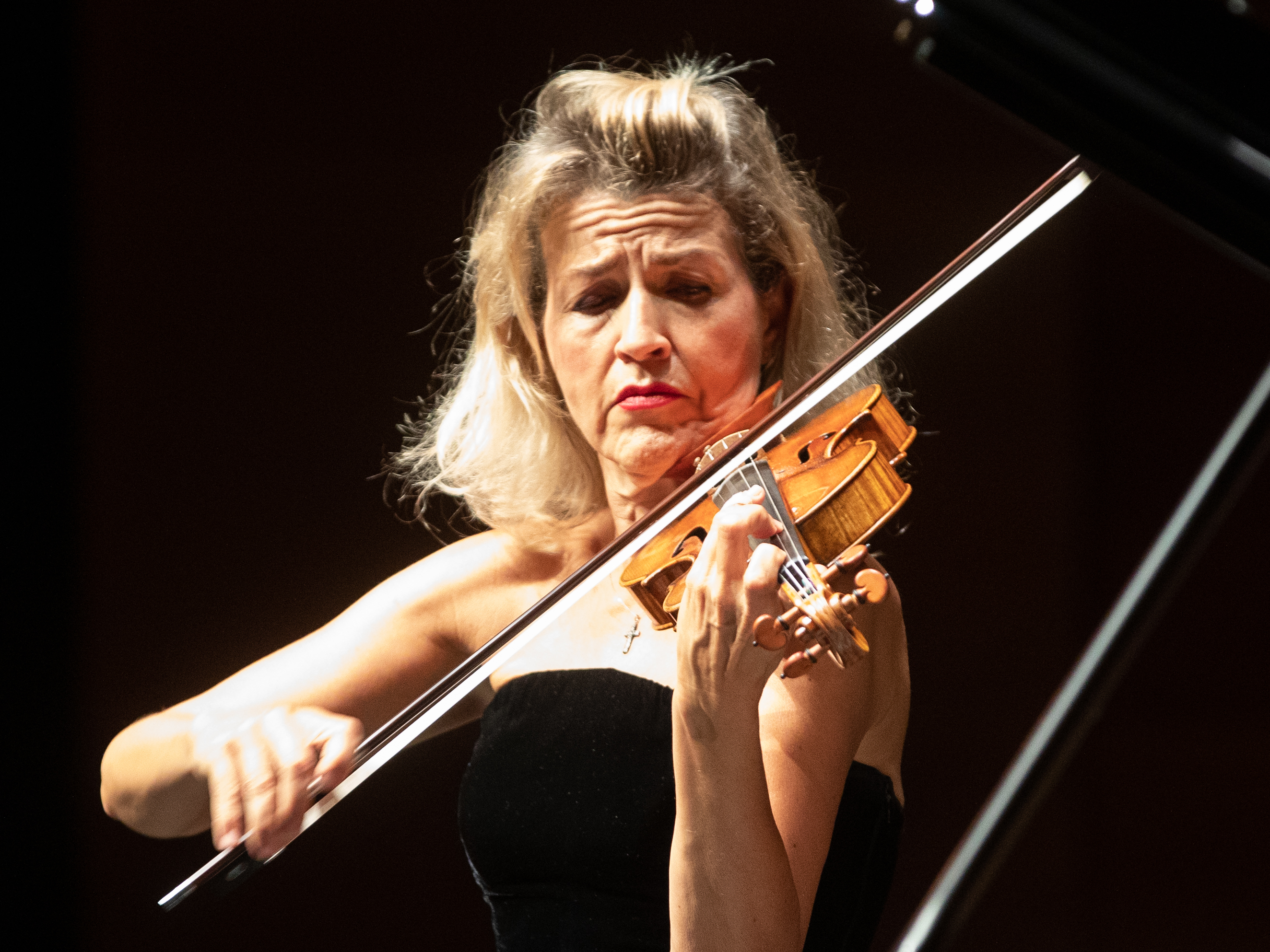
Mutter in 2021

Mutter's playing is known for its versatile technique, dynamic range, varied texture, and articulate, intense and multicolored sound. Mutter's playing has been described as bold, inventive, and striking, with one critic writing, "She somehow makes you aware, through passages of misty tone and deliberate accretions of intensity, of how many interpretive options there are beyond the one she has chosen, how many roads through a given work have gone untraveled."

Critics have noted Mutter's personal and thorough interpretation of the music and dedication to the musical works she plays, as she often studies the letters, original scores, and other historical documents by the composer to guide her interpretation.

While critics universally acknowledge Mutter's technical ability, critical opinion remains divided regarding her interpretive style. Some praise her interpretive self-reflection, dexterity, intellectual energy, and musical sophistication, while others regard her playing as overly refined and idiosyncratic, arguing that it is overly focused on minute details and that Mutter over-interprets works, imposing herself on the music.

Some critics have pointed out that Mutter’s recent playing lacks the naturalness and serenity of her earlier performances and recordings under Karajan in the 1980s and attribute this shift to her overly sophisticated and detailed readings and attempts to reinvent the music. Regarding a more recent live recording, one critic wrote, "Every last detail has been dissected and considered, every phrase is minutely shaded; the subtleties of her bowing could in themselves fill a review. Yet I find the results strangely unmoving. It's live, but everything is so highly refined that it doesn't sound it: In Mutter's hands, the music has become perfectly embalmed."

Mutter is known for performing in strapless gowns. Mutter explained that she felt having fabric on her shoulder made it too slippery to hold her violin firmly while she was playing.

In 2025, the BBC Music Magazine ranked Mutter among the greatest violinists of all time based on a survey of 100 prominent string players. The Gramophone Magazine ranked her among the 30 greatest violinists on record for her recording of the Previn Violin concerto.

== Instruments ==
She owns two Stradivarius violins: the Emiliani of 1703, and the Lord Dunn-Raven Stradivarius of 1710, of which Mutter primarily performs on the latter. Mutter acquired the Emilinia from John & Arthur Beare in London in 1979 and the Lord Dunn-Raven from Bein & Fushi in Chicago in 1984. She also owns a Finnigan-Klaembt dated 1999 and a Regazzi dated 2005.

Mutter has described her Stradivarius violin as her soul mate, saying "It sounded the way I (had) always been hoping. It's the oldest part of my body and my soul. The moment I am on stage, we are one, musically." Mutter ascribes the personal fit of her Stradivarius violin to the "depths of the colors and the incredible amount of dynamic range." She prefers the Lord Dunn-Raven, stating that the Emilia lacks "a dimension: It has no edginess. I miss the unbridled power. I need this roughness for the eruptive moments of the Beethoven sonatas. You need it for Brahms, Sibelius and contemporary works."

== Public engagement ==
Throughout her career, Mutter has held many benefit concerts for various organizations such as Save the Children Japan, Save the Children Yemen, Artists against Aids, the Swiss Multiple Sclerosis Society, the Hanna and Paul Gräb Foundation's Haus der Diakonie in Wehr-Öflingen, the Bruno Bloch Foundation, Beethoven Fund for Deaf Children, SOS Children's Villages in Syria and others. In 2018, Mutter gave a benefit concert commemorating a liberation concert in May 1945 for Holocaust survivors by Ex-Concentration Camp Orchestra, Jewish musicians who survived the Holocaust, at the St. Ottilien Archabbey. In 2022, the New York Philharmonic and Mutter performed Jewish music, including Previn's violin concerto at Peenemünde, a former Nazi army research center site. Since March 2022, Mutter has been giving benefit concerts for Ukrainians in light of the Russian invasion of Ukraine.

Mutter founded the Association of Friends of the Anne-Sophie Mutter Foundation e.V. in 1997 and further established the Anne-Sophie Mutter Foundation in 2008, which supports young stringed instrument players and provides scholarships for talented individuals. Mutter initiated the foundation based on her belief that "Music should grip people, move people; it should tell stories; it should have an impact." Since 2011, the ensemble group Mutter's Virtuosi performs with Mutter and includes students supported by the foundation that also commissions new works for its students. Notable former scholarship holders and Mutter's Virtuosi members include violinists Timothy Chooi, Fanny Clamagirand, Vilde Frang, Sergey Khachatryan, Arabella Steinbacher, Noa Wildschut, and Nancy Zhou and cellists Pablo Ferrández, Maximilian Hornung, Linus Roth, Daniel Müller-Schott, and Kian Soltani, among others.

During the COVID-19 pandemic, Mutter voiced her concerns about the impact of lockdowns on musicians, particularly classical musicians, and called for the German government to provide financial support.

In 2021, Mutter was elected president of the German Cancer Aid.

== Personal life ==
In 1989, Mutter married her first husband, Detlef Wunderlich, with whom she had two children, Arabella and Richard. Wunderlich died of cancer in 1995. She dedicated her 1999 recording, Vivaldi: The Four Seasons, to his memory. She married the pianist, composer, and conductor André Previn, 34 years her senior, in 2002. The couple divorced in 2006, but continued to collaborate musically and maintained their friendship. She lives in Munich.

== Awards and recognition ==
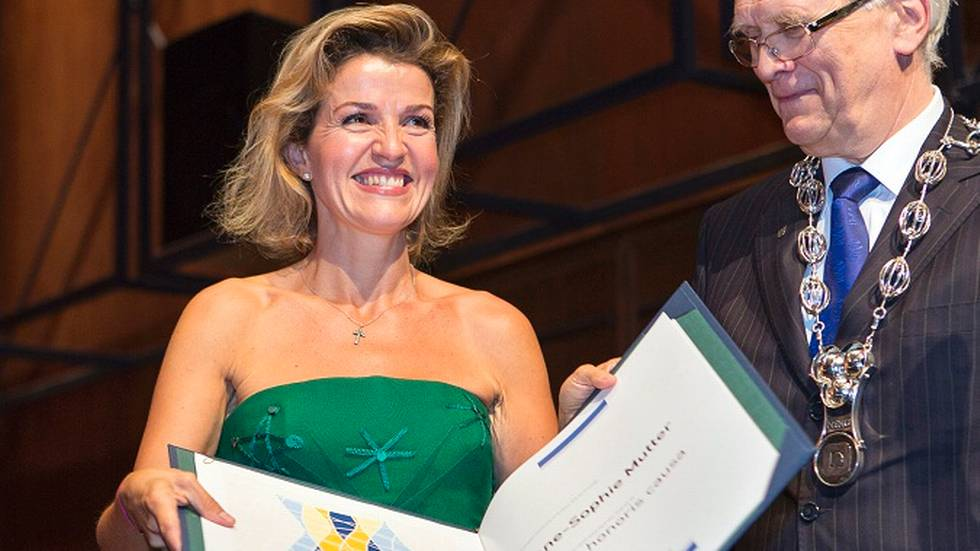
Mutter receives honorary doctorate from NTNU in Trondheim (2010)

- Grammy Award for Best Chamber Music Performance:
  - Anne-Sophie Mutter and Lambert Orkis for Beethoven: The Violin Sonatas (Nos. 1–3, Op. 12; Nos. 1–3, Op. 30; "Spring" Sonata) (2000)
- Grammy Award for Best Instrumental Soloist(s) Performance (with orchestra):
  - Anne-Sophie Mutter and André Previn (conductor) for Previn: Violin Concerto "Anne-Sophie"/Bernstein: Serenade (2005)
  - Anne-Sophie Mutter, Krzysztof Penderecki (conductor) and the London Symphony Orchestra for Penderecki: Violin Concerto No. 2, Metamorphosen (1999)
  - Anne-Sophie Mutter, James Levine (conductor) and the Chicago Symphony Orchestra for Berg: Violin Concerto/Rihm: Time Chant (1994)
- Grand Prix International du Disque for Mozart Violin Concertos Nos. 3 and 5 with Herbert von Karajan and Berlin Philharmonic (1979)
- Record Academy Prize, Tokyo for Mendelssohn/Bruch Violin Concerto with Herbert von Karajan and Berlin Philharmonic (1981)
- Naming of Anne-Sophie-Mutter-Weg in Wehr, Baden-Württemberg (Eng: Anne-Sophie Mutter way) (27 August 1988)
- Order of Merit of Baden-Württemberg (1999)
- Austrian Cross of Honour for Science and Art (1999)
- Sonning Award (2001; Denmark)
- Cultural Honor Prize of the City of Munich (2001)
- Bavarian Maximilian Order for Science and Art (2002)
- Herbert von Karajan Music Prize (Baden-Baden, 2003)
- Knight of the Ordre des Arts et des Lettres (2005)
- Victoires de la Musique Classique (2006)
- Grand Decoration of Honour for Services to the Republic of Austria (2007)
- Ernst von Siemens Music Prize (2008)
- Leipzig International Mendelssohn Prize (Music category) (2008)
- Merit Cross 1st Class of the Federal Republic of Germany (Verdienstkreuz 1. Klasse) (2009)
- Chevalier de la Legion d'honneur (France, 2009) for her commitment to the works of contemporary music by French
- Echo Klassik as Instrumentalist (2009)
- European St. Ulrichs Prize (July 2009)
- Doctor Honoris Causa from the Norwegian University of Science and Technology (NTNU) (2010)
- Prize of the Cultural Foundation of Dortmund
- Brahms Prize (Brahms Society of Schleswig-Holstein, 2011)
- Atlantic Council Distinguished Artistic Leadership Award (2012)
- Bavarian Order of Merit
- Honorary Member of the Royal Academy of Music
- Erich Fromm Prize for her comprehensive social work (2011)
- Gustav Adolf Prize of Gustav-Adolf-Werk of the Evangelical Church in Hesse-Nassau for her socially diaconal commitment
- The Medal of the Lutosławski Centennial (25 January 2013)
- Named a Foreign Honorary Member of the American Academy of Arts and Sciences (April 2013)
- Echo Klassik 2014 for the album 'Dvořák'
- Named an Honorary Fellow of Keble College, Oxford
- 11th Yehudi Menuhin Prize from the Foundation Albeniz (2016)
- Medalla de Oro al Merito en las bellas Artes (2016)
- Romanian Cultural Order of Merit with the rank of Grand Officer (2017)
- Gold Medal for Merit to Culture – Gloria Artis (2018)
- Polar Music Prize (2019)
- Berliner Bär (BZ-Cultural Prize) (2019)
- Praemium Imperiale (2019)
- Cultural Award of Baden-Württemberg (2020)
- Opus Klassik, Category Instrumentalist (Violin) for Across the Stars (2020)
- Honorary Degree Of Doctor Honoris Causa from the Krzysztof Penderecki Academy of Music in Kraków (2022)
- Opus Klassik Instrumentalist of the Year Award (2023) for Williams' Violin Concerto No. 2 & Selected Film Themes
- Grand Staufer Medal in Gold (2025)
- Enescu Festival Award of Excellence (2025)

== Discography ==
Deutsche Grammophon:

- Mozart Violin Concertos Nos. 3 & 5 (1978) -The Originals Series
- Beethoven Triple Concerto (1980)
- Beethoven Violin Concerto (1980)
- Mendelssohn Violin Concerto / Bruch Violin Concerto No. 1 (1981) -The Originals Series
- Brahms Violin Concerto(1982)
- Brahms Double Concerto (1983)
- Tchaikovsky Violin Concerto (1988)
- Lutosławski Partita & Chain 2 / Stravinsky Violin Concerto (1988)
- Beethoven: The String Trios (1989)
- Bartok Violin Concerto No. 2 / Moret En Rêve (1991)
- Berg Violin Concerto / Rihm Time Chant (1992)
- Carmen-Fantasy (1993)
- Romance (1995)
- Sibelius Violin Concerto (1995)
- The Berlin Recital (1996)
- Brahms Violin Concerto / Schumann Fantasy for Violin and Orchestra (1997)
- Penderecki Violin Concerto No. 2 / Bartok Sonata for Violin and Piano No. 2 (1997)
- Beethoven The Violin Sonatas (1998)
- Vivaldi The Four Seasons (1999)
- Recital 2000 (2000)
- Lutosławski Partita for Violin and Orchestra / Chain 2 (2002)
- Beethoven Violin Concerto (2002)
- Tango Song and Dance (2003)
- Previn Violin Concerto / Bernstein Serenade (2003)
- Tchaikovsky & Korngold Violin Concertos (2004)
- Dutilleux Sur le même accord / Bartok Violin Concerto No. 2 / Stravinsky Concerto en ré (2005)
- Mozart The Violin Concertos (2005)
- Mozart Piano Trios K502, K542, K548 (2006)
- Mozart The Violin Sonatas (August 2006)
- Simply Anne-Sophie (2006)
- Gubaidulina in tempus praesens (2008)
- Mendelssohn Violin Concerto (2009)
- Brahms Violin Sonatas (2010)
- Rihm: Lichtes Spiel; Currier: Time Machines (2011)
- The Complete Musician: Highlights (2011)
- Asm 35: The Complete Musician (2011)
- Dvořák: Violin Concerto (2013)
- The Silver Album (2014)
- Anne-Sophie Mutter Live: The Club Album from Yellow Lounge (2015)
- Mutterissimo: The Art of Anne-Sophie Mutter (2016)
- Franz Schubert: Trout Quintet (with Daniil Trifonov, Maximilian Hornung, Hwayoon Lee, und Roman Patkaló)(2017)
- Hommage à Penderecki (2018)
- The Early Years (2018)
- The Tokyo Gala Concert (2019)
- "Hedwig's Theme" from Harry Potter (2019)
- Across the Stars (2019) (Works of John Williams; Direction: John Williams)
- "Remembrances" & "Markings" (2019)
- Beethoven Triple Concerto & Symphony 7 (with Barenboim and Yo-Yo Ma) (2020)
- John Williams in Vienna (2020)
- Williams, Violin Concerto No. 2 & Selected Film Themes (2022)
- The Solo Concertos: Beethoven, Brahms, Bruch, Mendelssohn, Mozart, Tschaikowski (2023)
- Anne-Sophie Mutter & Mutter‘s Virtuosi (Bach, Bologne, Previn, Vivaldi, Williams) (2023)

Sony Classical Records:

- Brahms Double Concerto & Clara Schumann Piano Trio (2022)

EMI Classics:

- Mozart Violin Concertos Nos. 2 & 4 (1982)
- Bach Violin Concertos / Concerto for Two Violins and Orchestra (1983)
- Brahms Violin Sonatas (1983)
- Vivaldi The Four Seasons (1984)
- Lalo: Symphonie Espagnole / Sarasate: Zigeunerweisen (1985)
- Mozart Violin Concerto No. 1, Sinfonia Concertante (1991)
- Meditation: Vivaldi, Mozart, Massenet, Sarasate (1995)

Alpha Classics:

- East Meets West (2026)
