= Lord Dunn–Raven Stradivarius =

Violin by Antonio Stradivari

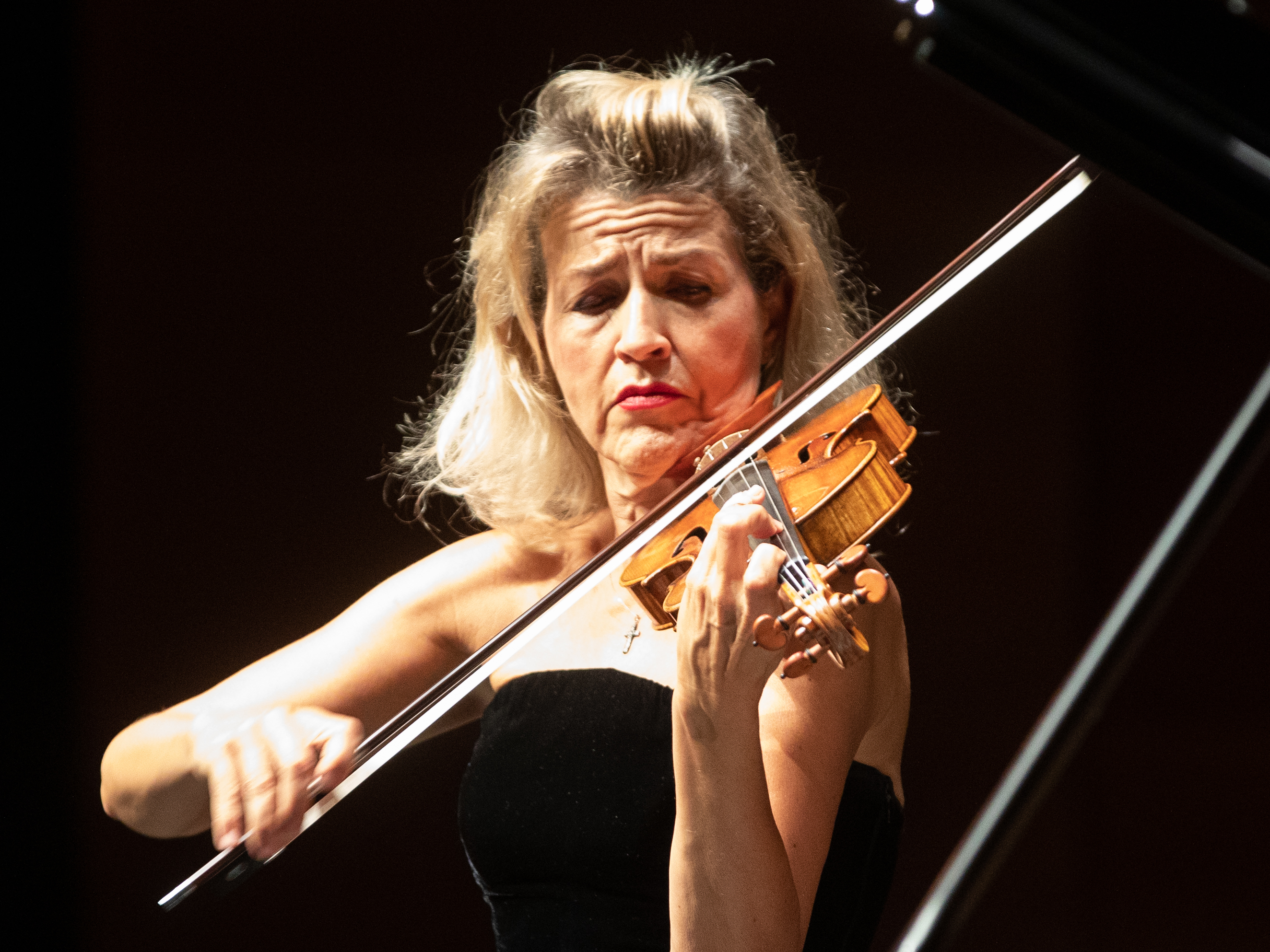
Anne-Sophie Mutter playing the Lord Dunn-Raven Stradivarius

The Lord Dunn–Raven Stradivarius of 1710 is an antique violin made by luthier Antonio Stradivari of Cremona (1644–1737). It is one of 700 known existent Stradivari instruments. This violin is currently owned by violinist Anne-Sophie Mutter. The Lord Dunn-Raven was made during the Stradivari's "golden period". The violin is named after the Irish politician Windham Wyndham-Quin, 4th Earl of Dunraven and Mount-Earl.

== Ownership ==
In the late 18th and early 19th century, English luthier John Edward Betts owned the violin. Remaining in the British Isles, the violin was owned by the Irish journalist, landowner, entrepreneur, sportsman, and politician Lord Dunn-Raven from 1890 to 1923, after whom the violin was named. English businessman and amateur violinist Walter Willson Cobbett acquired the violin in 1923, and it was sold at W. E. Hill & Sons in London to Robert A. Bower (Somerset), who kept it until 1936. Subsequent owners included the London-based Hungarian violinist Jelly d'Arányi (1936–1966), Adela d'Aranyi (1966–74), violinist Oscar Lafer (Brazil) in 1974, and the teacher Felix van Dyl at the Guildhall School of Music in London.

In 1984, the violin came into the hands of the German violinist Anne-Sophie Mutter, who bought the violin at Bein & Fushi in Chicago. The violin is Mutter's primary instrument. On this violin, Mutter has given world premieres of several works by contemporary composers, such as violin concertos by André Previn, Sofia Gubaidulina, and John Williams, among other music pieces. Mutter has also toured with the violin throughout major cities and concert halls in the world.

== Characteristics ==
The back of the violin consists of two pieces of fine-flamed maple on a medium curl. The back pattern includes pieces glued in a herringbone pattern with an apex at the bottom. The dimensions of the Lord Dunn-Raven violin most likely reflect the new larger model that Antonio Stradivari started using around 1710, with the upper bout (upper part of the body) remaining the same and the lower bouts and the length of the body expanded by several millimeters. These characteristics allow for a more robust sound in the instrument.

Violinist Anne-Sophie Mutter has noted that the Lord-Dunn Raven violin has a "tiger-like quality to its sound" and, in comparison to her Emiliani Stradivarius of 1703, has more "depths of the colors and incredible amount of dynamic range." The violin has been noted for having a penetrating sound that can travel far distances and for its dynamic range.

== See also ==
- Stradivarius
- List of Stradivarius instruments
