= Norbert Moret =

Swiss composer (1921–1998)

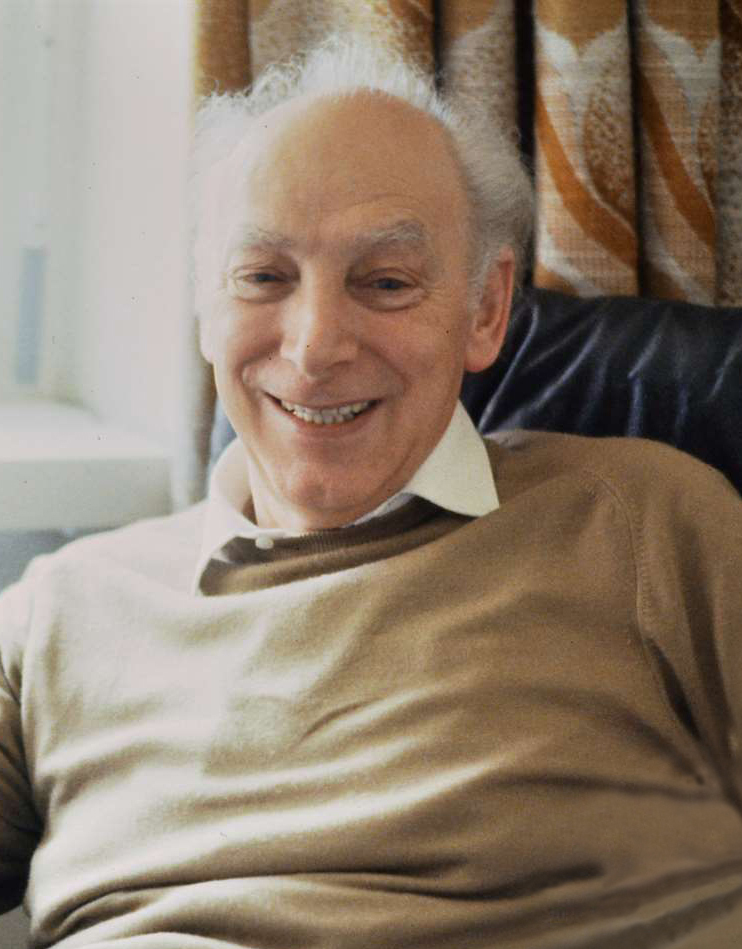
Norbert Moret (1984)

Norbert Moret (20 November 1921 – 17 November 1998) was a Swiss composer, conductor, pianist, and teacher.

== Life ==
Born in Ménières, Switzerland, Moret composed at least 36 instrumental and vocal works between 1966 and 1998, the year of his death. While he never achieved great worldwide recognition, he was honored by prizes and an honorary doctorate, and his music has been recorded by notable artists, Anne-Sophie Mutter (she performed his Violin Concerto En rêve), Mstislav Rostropovich (he performed his Cello Concerto), the Tallis Scholars, Heinz Holliger, and Aurèle Nicolet, among them. Seiji Ozawa, Armin Jordan, Paul Sacher, and others have conducted his orchestral music.

He died in Fribourg aged 76.
