= Aida Stucki =

Swiss violinist

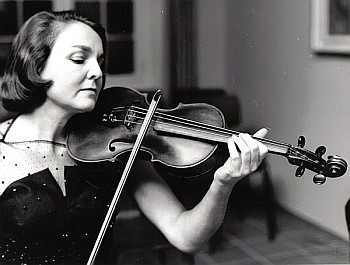

Background information
- Born: February 19, 1921; Cairo, Sultanate of Egypt
- Died: June 9, 2011 (aged 90); Winterthur, Switzerland
- Instrument: Violin
- Website: www.aida-stucki.com

Aida Stucki (February 19, 1921 – June 9, 2011) was a Swiss violinist and music teacher.

Stucki was born in Cairo as the third of four daughters to Swiss and Italian parents.

She studied with Ernst Wolters in Winterthur, with Stefi Geyer in Zurich, and with Carl Flesch in Lucerne. She worked with conductors such as Pina Pozzi, Walter Frey, Christoph Lieske, Clara Haskil, and Elly Ney.

From 1948, Stucki taught violin and chamber music at the Wintherthur Conservatory in Switzerland. Among her students was Anne-Sophie Mutter.

Her husband was Giuseppe Piraccini.

== See also ==
- Media related to Aida Stucki at Wikimedia Commons
