= Serenade after Plato's "Symposium" =

Composition by Leonard Bernstein

Serenade, after Plato's Symposium
- Serenade by Leonard Bernstein
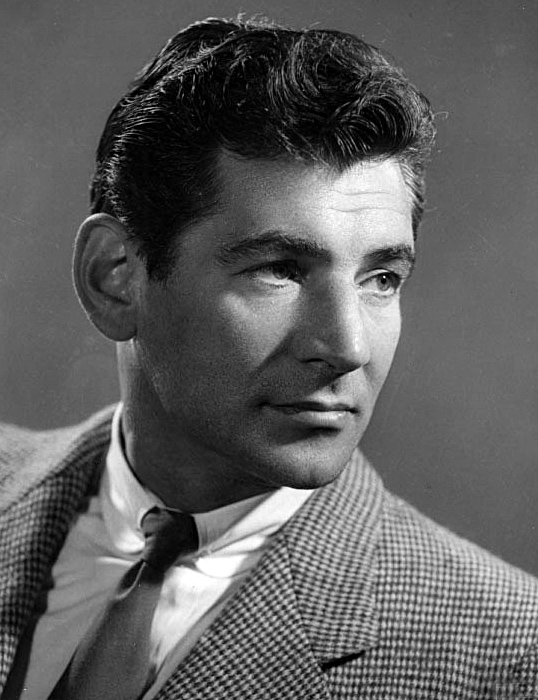
- The composer in the 1950s
- Dedication: Serge and Natalie Koussevitzky
- Performed: September 11, 1954: La Fenice, Venice
- Movements: five
- Scoring: violin; strings; percussion

The Serenade, after Plato's Symposium, is a composition by Leonard Bernstein for solo violin, strings and percussion. He completed the serenade in five movements on August 7, 1954. For the serenade, the composer drew inspiration from Plato's Symposium, a dialogue of related statements in praise of love, each statement made by a distinguished speaker.

Commissioned by the Koussevitzky Foundation, the Serenade is dedicated to "the beloved memory of Serge and Natalie Koussevitzky". The premiere was conducted by Bernstein himself on September 12, 1954, at La Fenice (Venice), with the Israel Philharmonic Orchestra and violinist Isaac Stern. It was also first recorded by Stern and Bernstein for Columbia Records on April 19, 1956, in New York City, with the Symphony of the Air.

== Music ==
The seven speakers who inspired Bernstein's five movements are:

1. Phaedrus: Pausanias – marked Lento and Allegro
2. Aristophanes – marked Allegretto
3. Eryximachus, the doctor – marked Presto
4. Agathon – marked Adagio
5. Socrates: Alcibiades – marked Molto tenuto and Allegro molto vivace

Although the Serenade is scored for violin, strings, harp and percussion (timpani and five more percussionists playing side drum, tenor drum, bass drum, triangle, suspended cymbal, xylophone, glockenspiel, chimes, Chinese blocks, tambourine), the violin is the most prominent solo instrument. The composition is about a half-hour in length.

== Sources ==
- Bernstein Season: Serenade after Plato's Symposium , a BBC programme on the work.
