= Gramophone Classical Music Awards =

British award for recordings of classical music

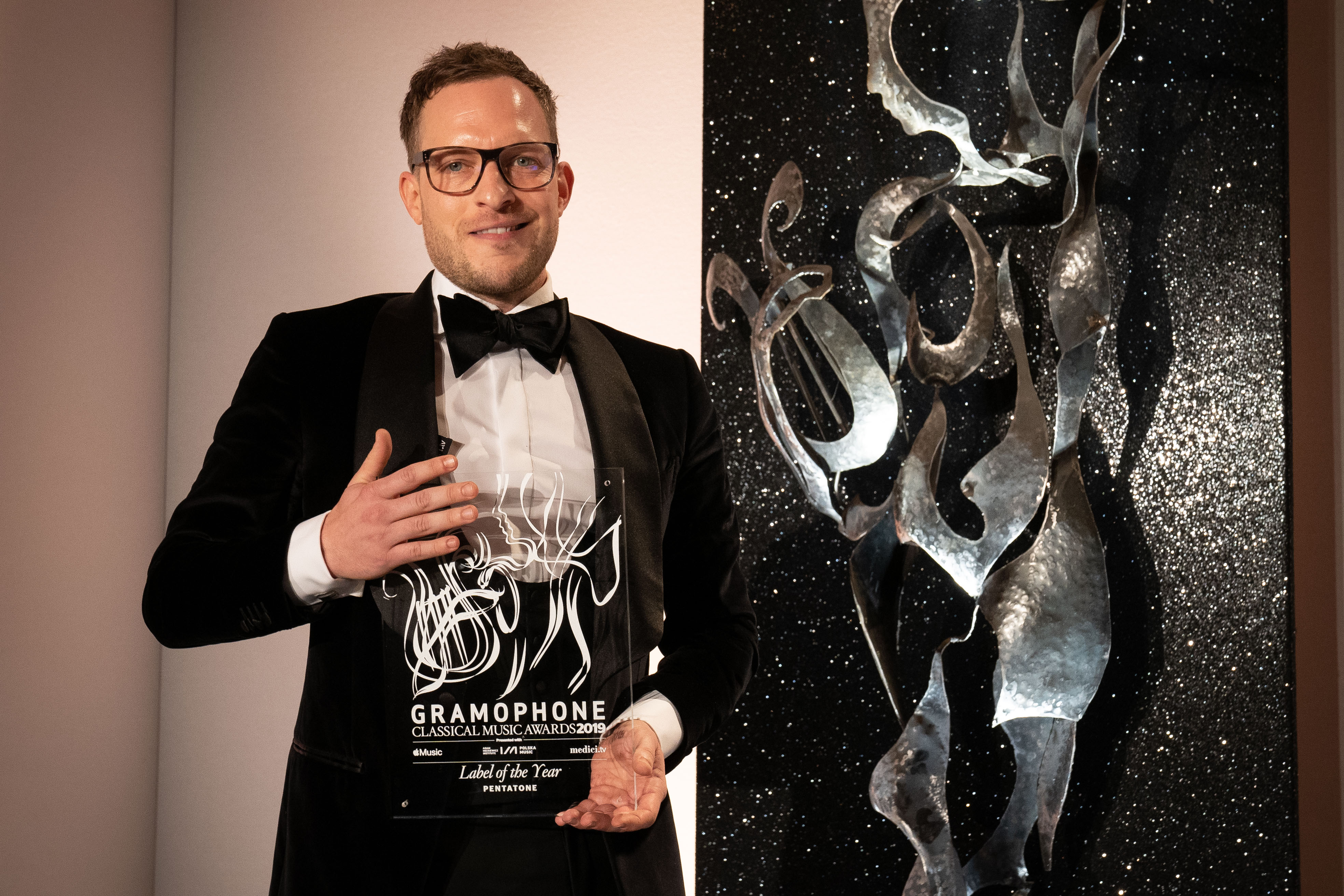
Pentatone's Simon Eder collects the Gramophone's Label of the Year Award 2019

The Gramophone Classical Music Awards, launched in 1977, are one of the most significant honours bestowed on recordings in the classical record industry. The British awards are often viewed as equivalent to or surpassing the American Grammy Awards, and referred to as the Oscars for classical music. They are widely regarded as the most influential and prestigious classical music awards in the world. According to Matthew Owen, national sales manager for Harmonia Mundi USA, "ultimately it is the classical award, especially worldwide."

The winners are selected annually by critics for the Gramophone magazine and various members of the industry, including retailers, broadcasters, arts administrators, and musicians. Awards are usually presented in September each year in London.

== 1977–1980 ==
Category	1977	1978	1979	1980
Chamber	Fitzwilliam Quartet – Shostakovich: String Quartets 4 & 12	Martha Argerich, Stephen Bishop-Kovacevich, Willy Goudswaard, Michael de Roo – Bartók: Sonata for 2 Pianos; Debussy, En blanc et noir; Mozart: Andante With 5 Variations for Piano	Beaux Arts Trio – Haydn: piano trios	Maurizio Pollini – Brahms: Piano Quintet; Quartetto Italiano – solo
Choral	Philip Ledger conducting Kings College Choir, New Philharmonia Orchestra – Elgar: Coronation Ode; Parry: I was glad	John Eliot Gardiner conducting Monteverdi Choir and Orchestra – Handel: Dixit Dominus	Seiji Ozawa conducting Tanglewood Festival Chorus, Boston Symphony Orchestra – Schoenberg: Gurre-Lieder	John Eliot Gardiner conducting Monteverdi Choir – Handel: L'Allegro, il Penseroso
Concerto	Neville Marriner conducting Academy of St Martin in the Fields – Mozart: Piano Concerto No. 22; Alfred Brendel – solo	Simon Rattle conducting London Symphony Orchestra – Prokofiev: Piano Concerto No. 1; Andrei Gavrilov – solo	Claudio Abbado conducting Chicago Symphony Orchestra – Bartók: Piano Concerto Nos. 1 & 2; Maurizio Pollini – solo	Lorin Maazel conducting French National Orchestra – Ravel: Piano Concerto in G; Jean-Philippe Collard – solo
Contemporary	Pierre Boulez conducting London Symphony Orchestra – Berio: Concerto for Two Pianos; Luciano Berio conducting BBC Symphony Orchestra	Pierre Boulez conducting Juilliard String Quartet, London Symphony Orchestra – Webern: Complete Works	Simon Rattle conducting Philharmonia Orchestra – Davies: Symphony No. 1	David Atherton conducting London Sinfonietta -Birtwistle: Punch and Judy
Early Music	Julian Bream – Dowland: Lute Works	John Eliot Gardiner conducting English Baroque Soloists – Handel: Acis and Galatea	Christopher Hogwood conducting Academy of Ancient Music – Mozart: Symphonies Vol. 3	Trevor Pinnock conducting The English Concert – C. P. E. Bach: Sinfonias
Engineering	-	-	André Previn conducting London Symphony Orchestra – Debussy: Images pour orchestre, Prélude à l'après-midi d'un faune	Bernard Haitink conducting Concertgebouw Orchestra – Debussy: Nocturnes, Jeux
Historical	The Record of Singing	Charles Bruck conducting Netherlands Opera Chorus and Orchestra – Gluck: Orfeo ed Euridice	Record of Singing Vol. 2	-
Historical Vocal	-	-	-	Gramophone Co. Recordings – Lucia
Historical Non-Vocal	-	-	-	Joseph Szigeti, Benny Goodman – Bartók: Contrasts
Instrumental	Maurizio Pollini – Beethoven: Piano Sonatas 27–32	Alfred Brendel – Liszt: Piano Works	Peter Hurford – Bach: Organ Works Vol. 3	Krystian Zimerman – Brahms: Piano Sonatas 1 & 2
Operatic	Charles Mackerras conducting Vienna State Opera, Vienna Philharmonic – Janáček: Káťa Kabanová	Zubin Mehta conducting Royal Opera House Choir and Orchestra – Puccini: La fanciulla del West	Pierre Boulez conducting Paris Opera Orchestra – Berg: Lulu	Charles Mackerras conducting Vienna State Opera, Vienna Philharmonic – Janáček: From the House of the Dead
Orchestral	Adrian Boult conducting London Philharmonic Orchestra – Elgar: Symphony No. 1	Benjamin Britten conducting English Chamber Orchestra – Mozart: Symphonies 25 & 29	André Previn conducting London Symphony Orchestra – Debussy: Images pour orchestre, Prélude à l'après-midi d'un faune	Bernard Haitink conducting Royal Concertgebouw Orchestra – Debussy: Nocturnes
Solo Vocal	Maxim Shostakovich conducting Moscow Radio Symphony Orchestra – Shostakovich: Suite, Six Songs to Lyrics, etc.	André Previn conducting London Symphony Orchestra – Chausson: Poème; Duparc: Melodies; Janet Baker – solo	Elisabeth Söderström, Vladimir Ashkenazy – Grechaninov, etc., Five Children's Songs	Graham Trew, Roger Vignoles – A Shropshire Lad

== 1981–1985 ==
Category	1981	1982/1983	1984	1985
Chamber	Tokyo Quartet – Bartók: String Quartets 1–6	Borodin Quartet – Borodin: String Quartets 1 & 2	Lindsay Quartet – Beethoven: Late String Quartets	Alban Berg Quartett – Beethoven: Late String Quartets
Choral	Eric Fenby conducting Royal Philharmonic Orchestra – Delius: Fenby Legacy	Joshua Rifkin conducting Bach Ensemble – Bach: Mass in B minor	Peter Schreier conducting Dresden State Orchestra, Margaret Price, Trudeliese Schmidt, Francisco Araiza, Theo Adam – Mozart: Requiem	John Rutter conducting Cambridge Singers, City of London Sinfonia, Caroline Ashton, Stephen Varcoe, Simon Standage, John Scott – Fauré: Requiem, Cantique de Jean Racine
Concerto	Carlo Maria Giulini conducting Philharmonia – Beethoven: Violin Concerto in D minor; Perlman – solo	Colin Davis conducting London Symphony Orchestra – Tippett: Triple Concerto	Murray Perahia conducting English Chamber Orchestra – Mozart: Piano Concertos 15, 16	Vernon Handley conducting London Philharmonic Orchestra, Nigel Kennedy – Elgar: Violin Concerto in B minor
Contemporary	David Atherton conducting London Sinfonietta – Tippett: King Priam	Pierre Boulez conducting BBC Symphony Orchestra, Phyllis Bryn-Julson – Boulez: Pli selon pli	Arditti Quartet (Irvine Arditti, Levine Andrade, Lennox MacKenzie, Rohan de Saram) – Brian Ferneyhough: Quartet 2, Jonathan Harvey: Quartet 2, Elliott Carter: String Quartet No. 3	Pierre Boulez conducting Ensemble InterContemporain, Adrienne Csengery, Márta Fábián, John Alldis Choir – György Kurtág: Messages de feu Demoiselle R.V. Troussova, Dalos: Opus 17, Birtwistle: ...agm...
Early Baroque	-	William Christie conducting Les Arts Florissants Vocal – Charpentier: Actéon	Reinhard Goebel conducting Musica Antiqua Köln – Bach: Kammermusik	William Christie conducting Les Arts Florissants Vocal, Jill Feldman, Jacques Bona, Sophie Boulin, Phillipe Cantor, Agnès Mellon, Gilles Ragon – Charpentier: Médée
Early Medieval	-	Christopher Page conducting Gothic Voices – Hildegard of Bingen: A Feather on the Breath of God	-	-
Early Medieval and Renaissance	-	-	Paul Hillier conducting Hilliard Ensemble – Dunstaple: Motets	David Hill conducting Westminster Cathedral Choir – Tomás Luis de Victoria: O quam gloriosum, Ave maris stella
Early Music	Cologne Music Antiqua – German Chamber Music	-	-	-
Engineering	Colin Davis conducting Royal Opera House Orchestra – Massenet: Werther	Bernard Haitink conducting Concertgebouw Orchestra – Shostakovich: Symphony No. 5	-	-
Engineering and Production	-	-	Bryden Thomson conducting Ulster Orchestra – Bax: Symphony No. 4, Tintagel	Charles Dutoit conducting Montreal Symphony Orchestra – Ravel: Ma mère l'Oye, Pavane pour une infante défunte, Le tombeau de Couperin, Valses nobles et sentimentales
Historical Non-Vocal	Busch Quartet, Rudolf Serkin, Reginald Kell, Aubrey Brain – Brahms: Chamber Works	Bartok: At the Piano Vol. 1	Danish Radio Symphony Orchestra – Carl Nielsen: Symphonies, Erik Tuxen, Launy Grøndahl, Thomas Jensen	
Historical Vocal	Hugo Wolf Society Lieder	Schubert – Historical Recordings of Lieder	Egon Petri – Piano Sonatas No. 30, no. 31, no. 32	Claudia Muzio: The Columbia Recordings 1934–1935. Italian Opera Arias, Italian, French and German Songs
Instrumental	Alfred Brendel – Liszt, Piano Works	Alfred Brendel – Liszt, Piano Sonata in B minor	Emil Gilels – Beethoven: Piano Sonata No. 29 in B♭ major	Jorge Bolet – Liszt: Années de pèlerinage
Operatic	Herbert von Karajan conducting Deutsche Opera, Berlin Philharmonic Orchestra – Wagner: Parsifal	Charles Mackerras conducting Vienna State Opera, Vienna Philharmonic – Janáček: The Cunning Little Vixen	Charles Mackerras conducting Vienna Philharmonic, Elisabeth Söderström, Wiesław Ochman, Peter Dvorský, Eva Randová, Lucia Popp – Janáček: Jenůfa	Bernard Haitink conducting London Philharmonic Orchestra, Thomas Allen, Carol Vaness, Maria Ewing, Elizabeth Gale, Keith Lewis, Richard Van Allan, Glyndebourne Chorus – Mozart: Don Giovanni
Orchestral	Herbert von Karajan conducting Berlin Philharmonic Orchestra – Mahler: Symphony No. 9	Herbert von Karajan conducting Berlin Philharmonic Orchestra – Strauss: Metamorphosen	Herbert von Karajan conducting Berlin Philharmonic Orchestra – Mahler's Symphony No. 9	Neeme Järvi conducting Scottish National Orchestra – Prokofiev: Symphony No. 6 in E♭ minor, Waltz Suite
Solo Vocal	Dietrich Fischer-Dieskau with Daniel Barenboim – Liszt: Lieder	Kurt Masur conducting Leipzig Gewandhaus Orchestra – Brahms: Lieder; solo: Jessye Norman	Kurt Masur conducting Gewandhaus Orchestra, Jessye Norman – Strauss: Four Last Songs	Tom Krause, Irwin Gage, Elisabeth Söderström, Vladimir Ashkenazy – Sibelius: Complete Songs

== 1986–1990 ==
Category	1986	1987	1988	1989	1990
Chamber	Fauré: Piano Quartets No. 1 in C minor; No. 2 in G minor	Jean-Phillipe Collard, Augustin Dumay, Muir Quartet – Chausson: Concert for Violin, Piano and String Quartet	Shlomo Mintz, Paul Ostrovsky – Mendelssohn: Violin Sonatas in F minor and F major	Emerson String Quartet – Bartók: String Quartets Nos. 1–6	Kyung Wha Chung, Krystian Zimerman – Respighi: Violin Sonata in B minor
Choral	Charles Mackerras conducting Czech Philharmonic, Elisabeth Söderström, Drahomíra Drobková, František Livora, Richard Novák – Janáček: Glagolitic Mass	Christopher Hogwood conducting Academy of Ancient Music, Joan Sutherland, Emma Kirkby, James Bowman, Aled Jones, Anthony Johnson, David Thomas – Handel: Athalia	Robert Shaw conducting Atlanta Symphony Orchestra and Chorus – Verdi: Requiem	John Eliot Gardiner conducting English Baroque Soloists, Monteverdi Choir, Lynne Dawson, Ruth Holton, Anne Sofie von Otter, Michael Chance, Nigel Robson, Stephen Varcoe, Scott Ross, Paul Nicholson – Handel: Jephtha	Armin Jordan conducting the Orchestre de la Suisse Romande, Edith Wiens, Anne Gjevang, Sylvia Herman, Hans-Peter Scheidegger – Schumann – Das Paradies und die Peri
Concerto	Bernard Haitink conducting Concertgebouw Orchestra, Murray Perahia – Beethoven: Piano Concertos Nos. 3 & 4	Bryden Thomson conducting English Chamber Orchestra, Stephen Hough – Hummel: Piano Concerto Nos. 2 & 3	Rudolf Barshai conducting Bournemouth Symphony Orchestra, Peter Donohoe – Tchaikovsky: Piano Concerto No. 2	Esa-Pekka Salonen conducting Swedish Radio Symphony Orchestra, Philharmonia Orchestra, Cho-liang Lin – Sibelius: Violin Concerto in D minor, Nielsen: Violin Concerto, Opus 33	Neemi Järvi conducting the Royal Scottish National Orchestra, Lydia Mordkovitch – Shostakovich: Violin Concerto No. 1
Contemporary	Esa-Pekka Salonen conducting Los Angeles Philharmonic – Lutosławski: Symphony No. 3	Andrew Davis conducting BBC Symphony Orchestra and Chorus, Faye Robinson, Sarah Walker, Robert Tear, John Cheek – Tippett: The Mask of Time	Elgar Howarth conducting London Sinfonietta – Birtwistle: Carmen Arcadiae Mechanicae Perpetuum, Silbury Air, Secret Theatre	Vernon Handley conducting Bournemouth Symphony Orchestra – Simpson: Symphony No. 9	George Benjamin conducting London Sinfonietta, Penelope Walmsley-Clark, Sebastian Bell – Benjamin: Antara, Boulez: Dérive 1, Memoriale, Harvey: Song Offerings
Early Baroque Music	Davitt Moroney (harpsichord) – Bach: Die Kunst der Fuge	-	John Eliot Gardiner conducting Monteverdi Choir, English Baroque Soloists, Donna Brown, Rachel Yakar, Howard Cook – Leclair: Scylla et Glaucus	Trevor Pinnock conducting The English Concert – Corelli: Concerti grossi	-
Early Medieval and Renaissance Music: Esther Lamandier – Chansons de toile au temps du Roman de la Rose	-	Christopher Page conducting Gothic Voices – The Service of Venus and Mars: Music for the Knights of the Garter	Gothic Voices – A Song for Francesca	-	
Early Music	-	Peter Phillips conducting The Tallis Scholars – Prez: Missa Pange lingua, Missa La sol fa re mi	-	-	Paul McCreesh conducting the Gabrieli Consort and Players – Gabrieli: Venetian Coronation 1595
Engineering	-	-	-	-	Oliver Knussen conducting the London Sinfonietta – Britten: The Prince of the Pagodas
Engineering and Production	Geoffrey Simon conducting Philharmonia Orchestra – Respighi: Belkis, Regina di Saba, Metamorphoseon	Charles Dutoit conducting Montréal Symphony Orchestra – Holst: The Planets	Simon Rattle conducting City of Birmingham Symphony Orchestra and Chorus, Arleen Augér, Janet Baker – Mahler: Resurrection Symphony	Neeme Järvi conducting Swedish Radio Symphony Orchestra – Tubin: Symphony Nos. 3 & 8	-
Non-Vocal Historic	Busch Quartet – Beethoven: Late String Quartets	Busch Quartet, Rudolf Serkin – Schubert: String Quartets, Piano Trio, Fantasia	Ginette Neveu, Philharmonia Orchestra; Walter Susskind (conductor) – Sibelius: Violin Concerto (Recorded 1945), Issay Dobrowen (conductor) – Brahms: Violin Concerto (Recorded 1946)	Bruno Walter conducting Vienna Philharmonic – Mahler: Symphony No. 9	Thomas Beecham conducting the London Philharmonic Orchestra – Delius: Paris: The Song of a Great City, Eventyr (Once Upon a Time), Irmelin prelude, Over the hills and far away
Vocal Historic	The Record of Singing, Vol. 3	Tito Schipa – The Art of Tito Schipa	Chaliapin	The Record of Singing, Vol. 4	Elie Cohen conducting the Opéra-Comique Orchestra and Chorus, Ninon Vallin, Georges Thill, Marcel Roque, Germaine Féraldy, Armand Narçon – Massenet: Werther
Instrumental	Murray Perahia, Radu Lupu – Schubert: Fantasia in F minor for piano duet, Mozart: Sonata for 2 pianos in D major	Alfred Brendel – Haydn: Piano Sonatos	Pascal Rogé – Poulenc: Piano Works	Mitsuko Uchida – Mozart: Piano Sonatas 1–18	Zoltán Kocsis – Debussy: Piano Works
Musical Theatre	-	-	-	John McGlinn – Kern: Show Boat	John McGlinn – Cole Porter: Anything Goes
Operatic	Claudio Abbado conducting Prague Philharmonic Chorus, Chamber Orchestra of Europe, Katia Ricciarelli, Lucia Valentini Terrani, Lella Cuberli, Cecilia Gasdia, Francisco Araiza, Eduardo Gimenez, Leo Nucci, Ruggero Raimondi, Samuel Ramey, Enzo Dara – Rossini: Il viaggio a Reims	Giuseppe Sinopoli conducting Philharmonia Orchestra, Rosalind Plowright, Agnes Baltsa, José Carreras, Renato Bruson, Paata Burchuladze, Juan Pons, John Tomlinson, Ambrosian Singers – Verdi: La forza del destino	Philip Brunelle conducting Plymouth Music Series Chorus and Orchestra – Britten: Paul Bunyan	Simon Rattle conducting Glyndebourne – Gershwin: Porgy and Bess	Kent Nagano conducting the Opéra National de Lyon Orchestra and Chorus – Prokofiev: L'Amour des trois oranges
Orchestral	Bernard Haitink conducting London Philharmonic Orchestra, Sheila Armstrong – Williams: Sinfonia Antarctica	Klaus Tennstedt conducting London Philharmonic Orchestra & Choir, Elizabeth Connell, Edith Wiens, Felicity Lott, Trudeliese Schmidt, Nadine Denize, Richard Versalle, Jorma Hynnimen, Hans Sotin, Tiffin School Boys' Choir – Mahler: Symphony No. 8	Simon Rattle conducting City of Birmingham Symphony Orchestra and Chorus, Arleen Augér, Janet Baker – Mahler: Resurrection Symphony	Claudio Abbado conducting the Chamber Orchestra of Europe – Schubert: Symphonies	Bernard Haitink conducting the London Philharmonic Orchestra, Felicity Lott, Jonathan Summers – Williams: A Sea Symphony
Period Performance	-	Roger Norrington conducting London Classical Players – Beethoven: Symphony Nos. 2 & 8	Trevor Pinnock conducting Philharmonia Orchestra and Chorus, Felicity Lott, Carolyn Watkinson, Maldwyn Davies, David Wilson-Johnson – Haydn: Nelson Mass, Te Deum in C major	-	
Remastered CD	Benjamin Britten conducting Royal Opera House Chorus & Orchestra, Peter Pears, Claire Watson, James Pease – Britten: Peter Grimes	Thomas Beecham conducting Royal Philharmonic Orchestra – Beecham Conducts Delius: The Complete Stereo Recordings	Herbert von Karajan conducting Philharmonia Orchestra and Chorus, Elisabeth Schwarzkopf, Christa Ludwig, Teresa Stich-Randall, Otto Edelmann, Eberhard Waechter – Strauss: Der Rosenkavalier	Lorin Maazel conducting the Orchestre National de France – Ravel: L'enfant et les sortilèges	-
Solo Vocal	Peter Schreier with Sviatoslav Richter – Schubert: Winterreise	Brigitte Fassbaender with Irwin Gage – Liszt: Lieder, Strauss: Lieder	Olaf Bär with Geoffrey Parsons – Schubert: Die schöne Müllerin	Janet Baker with Graham Johnson – Schubert: Lieder, vol. 1	Peter Schreier with András Schiff – Schubert: Schwanengesang, Heine: Lieder, Seidl: Lieder
Special Achievement	-	-	-	-	Nikolaus Harnoncourt conducting the Concentus Musicus Wien; Gustav Leonhardt conducting the Leonhardt-Consort – Complete Sacred Cantatas Vol. 1–45 (Bach)

== 1991–1995 ==
Category	1991	1992	1993	1994	1995
Artist of the Year	Luciano Pavarotti	Kiri Te Kanawa	Simon Rattle	John Eliot Gardiner	Pierre Boulez
Baroque Non-Vocal	Davitt Moroney, John Holloway – Biber: Mystery Sonatas	Christophe Rousset – Rameau: Harpsichord Works	Reinhard Goebel conducting Musica Antiqua Köln – Heinichen: Dresden Concertos	Pierre Hantaï – Bach: Goldberg Variations	Harmonia Mundi – Biber: Violin Sonatas; Romanesca
Baroque Vocal	Nicholas McGegan conducting the Philharmonia Baroque Orchestra, U.C. Berkeley Chamber Chorus, Lorraine Hunt, Drew Minter, Jill Feldman, William Parker, Jeffrey Thomas, David Thomas - Handel: Susanna	René Jacobs conducting the Concerto Köln, Jennifer Larmore, Barbara Schlick, Bernarda Fink, Marianne Rørholm, Derek Lee Ragin – Handel: Giulio Cesare	Marc Minkowski conducting Les Musiciens du Louvre, Catherine Bott, Christine Batty, Gérard Lesne, Richard Edgar-Wilson, Philippe Huttenlocher – Stradella: San Giovanni Battista	Concerto Italiano – Fourth Book of the Montev	William Christie conducting Les Arts Florissants – Rameau: Grant Motets
Best-Selling Disc	-	-	-	-	Zubin Mehta conducting the Los Angeles Philharmonic, Los Angeles Music Center Opera Chorus, José Carreras, Plácido Domingo, Luciano Pavarotti – The Three Tenors in Concert 1994
Best-Selling Record	-	Essential Opera	David Zinman conducting the London Sinfonietta, Upshaw – Górecki: Symphony of Sorrowful Songs	Ismael Fernández de la Cuesta conducting the Santo Domingo de Silos Abbey Chorus – Gregorian chant	
Chamber	Jaime Laredo conducting Emanuel Ax, Isaac Stern – Brahms: Piano Quartets 1, 2, & 3	Carmine Quartet – Szymanowski: String Quartet Nos. 1 & 2, Webern: Langsamer Satz	Quatuor Mosaïques – Haydn: String Quartets, Op. 20	Borodin Quartet, Yuri Yurov, Mikhail Milman – Tchaikovsky: String Quartets 1, 2, & 3, Souvenir de Florence	Domus – Fauré: Piano Quintets
Choral	John Eliot Gardiner conducting Orchestre Revolutionnaire et Romantique, Monteverdi Choir, Charlotte Margiono, Catherine Robbin, William Kendall, Alastair Miles – Beethoven: Missa solemnis	Richard Hickox conducting London Symphony Orchestra and Chorus, St Paul's Cathedral Choristers, Heather Harper, Philip Langridge, Martyn Hill, John Shirley-Quirk – Britten: War Requiem	Kurt Masur conducting the Israel Philharmonic Orchestra, MDR Rundfunkchor, Alistair Miles, Helen Donath, Jard van Nes, Donald George – Mendelssohn: Elias	Richard Hickox conducting the Bournemouth Symphony Orchestra, Bryn Terfel, Sally Burgess – Delius: Sea Drift, Songs of Farewell	-
Choral and engineering	-	-	-	-	Simon Rattle conducting the City of Birmingham Symphony Orchestra and Chorus – Szymanowski: Stabat Mater, Symphony No. 3
Concerto	Osmo Vänskä conducting the Lahti Symphony Orchestra, Leonidas Kavakos – Sibelius: Violin Concerto in D major	Jerzy Maksymiuk conducting BBC Scottish Symphony Orchestra, Nickolai Demidenko – Medtner: Piano Concerto Nos. 2 & 3	Wolfgang Sawallisch conducting the London Philharmonic Orchestra, Stephen Kovacevich, Ann Murray, Nobuko Imai – Brahms: Brahms Piano Concerto No. 1 in D minor, Two Songs for Voice, Viola and Piano	Simon Rattle conducting the City of Birmingham Symphony Orchestra, Kyung Wha Chung – Bartók: Violin Concerto No. 2, Rhapsodies Nos. 1 & 2	Rostropovich conducting the London Symphony Orchestra, Maxim Vengerov – Prokofiev: Violin Concerto No. 1, Shostakovich: Vio
Contemporary	Richard Bernas conducting the Music Project London, Adrian Clarke, John Hall, Patricia Rozario, Christopher Robson, Paul Wilson, Richard Morris, Paul Harrhy, Mary Thomas – John Casken: Golem	Gennady Rozhdestvensky conducting the London Symphony Orchestra, Steven Isserlis – Tavener: The Protecting Veil, Britten: Cello Suite No. 3	Jerzy Maksymiuk conducting the BBC Scottish Symphony Orchestra – MacMillan: The Confession of Isobel Gowdie, Koch: Tryst	Oliver Knussen conducting the BBC Symphony Orchestra – Holloway: Second Concerto for Orchestra	Pierre Boulez conducting Ensemble intercontemporain, Saschko Gawriloff, Jean-Guihen Queyras, Pierre-Laurent Aimard – Ligeti: Concertos for Piano, Violin, and Cello
Early Opera Music	-	-	-	-	William Christie conducting Les Arts Florissants – Purcell: King Arthur
Early Music	Peter Phillips conducting The Tallis Scholars – Palestrina: Missa Assumpta est Maria, Missa Sicut lilium inter spinas	Harry Christophers conducting The Sixteen – "The Rose and The Ostrich Feather", Music from the Eton Choirbook, Vol. 1	Paul McCreesh conducting the Gabrieli Consort and Players – Venetian Vespers	Peter Phillips conducting The Tallis Scholars – Rore: Missa Praeter rerum seriem	Andrew Carwood conducting The Cardinall's Musick – Fayrfax: Missa O quam glorifica, etc.
Engineering	Nicholas Braithwaite conducting the London Philharmonic Orchestra – Wordsworth: Symphony Nos. 2 & 3	Richard Hickox conducting London Symphony Orchestra, Chorus, St Paul's Cathedral Choristers, Heather Harper, Philip Langridge, Martyn Hill, John Shirley-Quirk – Britten: War Requiem, Sinfonia da Requiem, Ballad of Heroes	Michael Tilson Thomas conducting the London Symphony Orchestra, Chorus, Sylvia McNair, Nathalie Stutzmann, Ann Murray, Leslie Caron – Debussy: Le martyre de Saint Sébastien	Yan Pascal Tortelier conducting the BBC Philharmonic – Dutilleux: Symphony Nos. 1 & 2	Simon Rattle conducting the City of Birmingham Symphony Orchestra and Chorus – Szymanowski – Stabat Mater, Symphony No. 3
Historical Non-Vocal	Anton Webern conducting BBC Symphony Orchestra, Galimir Quartet, Louis Krasner – Berg: Violin Concerto, Lyric Suite	Edward Elgar conducting the Royal Philharmonic Orchestra – The Elgar Edition, Vol. 1	Sergei Rachmaninov – The Complete Recordings	Hollywood String Quartet, Alvin Dinkin, Kurt Reher – Schoenberg: Verklärte Nacht, Schubert: String Quintet in C major	Wilhelm Furtwängler conducting the Philharmonia Orchestra, Lucerne Festival Chorus – Beethoven: Symphony No. 9
Historical Vocal	Gérard Souzay with Jacqueline Bonneau – Fauré, Chausson, Airs Français	Covent Garden on Record: A History	Singers of Imperial Russia, vols. 1–4	English Opera Group, BBC Theatre Chorus, Orchestra of the Royal Opera House, Peter Pears, Joan Cross, Nancy Evans, Sophie Wyss, Benjamin Britten – _Peter Grimes, The Rape of Lucretia, Folksong Arrangements	Ernest Bour conducting the French Radio National Orchestra and Chorus – Ravel: L'enfant et les sortileges
Instrumental	Tatyana Nikolaieva – Shostakovich: 24 Preludes and Fugues	Olli Mustonen – Preludes, Op. 31, Shostakovich: 24 Preludes	Shura Cherkassky – 80th Birthday Recital	Krystian Zimerman – Debussy: Préludes	Murray Perahia – Chopin: Four Ballades, Mazurkas, Études, Nocturnes
Lifetime Achievement	Joan Sutherland	Georg Solti	Dietrich Fischer-Dieskau	Klaus Tennstedt	Michael Tippett
Music Theatre	Original London Cast – Sondheim: Into the Woods	Leonard Bernstein conducting the London Symphony Orchestra, Chorus, Jerry Hadley, June Anderson – Bernstein: Candide	Eric Stern, Lara Teeter, Ann Morrison – Gershwin: Lady, Be Good!	Michael Tilson Thomas conducting the London Symphony Orchestra – Bernstein: On the Town	I wish it so – The Songs of Vernon Duke; Dawn Upshaw (soprano); orchestra / Eric Stern conducting Dawn Upshaw, orchestra – Duke: The Songs of Vernon Duke ("I Wish It So")
Opera	John Eliot Gardiner conducting the English Baroque Soloists, Anthony Rolfe Johnson, Anne Sofie Von Otter, Hillevi Martinpelto, Sylvia McNair, Nigel Robson, Glenn Winslade – Mozart: Idomeneo	Kent Nagano conducting the Opéra National de Lyon. Catherine Dubosc, Rita Gorr, Rachel Yakar, Brigitte Fournier, Martine Dupuy, José van Dam, Jean-Luc Viala – Poulenc: Dialogues des Carmélites	Charles Mackerras conducting the Welsh National Opera, Josephine Barstow, Phillip Langridge – Britten: Gloriana	Richard Hickox conducting Chorus & Orchestra of Opera North – Walton: Troilus and Cressida	
Orchestral	Herbert Blomstedt conducting the San Francisco Symphony, Kevin McMillan, Fromm, – Nielsen: "The Four Temperaments", Sinfonia Espansiva	Georg Solti conducting the Vienna Philharmonic, Hildegard Behrens, Plácido Domingo, Reinhild Runkel, José van Dam, Júlia Várady, Sumi Jo – Strauss: Die Frau ohne Schatten	Riccardo Chailly conducting the Royal Concertgebouw Orchestra – Hindemith: Kammermusik	David Zinman conducting the Berlin Radio Symphony Orchestra – Koechlin: The Jungle Book, Symphonic Poems	Simon Rattle conducting the City of Birmingham Symphony Orchestra, Birmingham Contemporary Music Group, Phyllis Bryn-Julson – Schoenberg: Chamber Symphony No. 1, Erwartung
Record of the Year	John Eliot Gardiner conducting Orchestre Revolutionnaire et Romantique, Monteverdi Choir, Charlotte Margiono, Catherine Robbin, William Kendall, Alastair Miles – Beethoven: Missa solemnis (Choral)	Nikolaus Harnoncourt conducting the Chamber Orchestra of Europe – Beethoven: 9 Symphonies (Orchestral)	Anne Sofie von Otter with Bengt Forsberg – Grieg songs (Solo Vocal)	Krystian Zimerman – Debussy: Préludes (Instrumental)	Mstislav Rostropovich conducting the London Symphony Orchestra, Maxim Vengerov – Prokofiev: Violin Concerto No. 1, Shostakovich: Vio (Concerto)
Solo Vocal	Peter Schreier with András Schiff – Schubert: Die schöne Müllerin	Brigitte Fassbaender with Aribert Reimann – Schubert: Lieder	Anne Sofie von Otter with Bengt Forsberg – Grieg songs	Cheryl Studer with Thomas Hampson & John Browning – Barber: Complete Songs	Bryn Terfel with Malcolm Martineau – Schubert: Lieder
Special Achievement	The Complete Mozart Edition	Abbey Road Studios	Edward Greenfield	Sviatoslav Richter – Richter: The Authorized Edition	John Mauceri conducting the Deutsches Symphonie-Orchester Berlin, Berlin Radio Chorus – Korngold: Das Wunder der Heliane
Video	-	-	Wolfgang Sawallisch conducting the Bavarian State Opera (1989) – Wagner: Der Ring des Nibelungen	Michael Tilson Thomas conducting the London Symphony Orchestra (1992) – Bernstein: On the Town	The Art of Conducting – Great Conductors of the Past
Young Artist of the Year	-	Bryn Terfel	Sarah Chang	Maxim Vengerov	-

== 1996–2000 ==
Category	1996	1997	1998	1999	2000
20th-Century Chamber	-	-	-	Arditti Quartet – Carter: String Quartets	-
20th-Century Concerto	-	-	-	Pierre Boulez, Krystian Zimerman – Ravel: Piano Concertos	
20th-Century Instrumental	-	-	-	Various artists – Berio: Sequenza	-
20th-Century Opera	-	-	-	Ulf Schirmer – Nielsen: Maskarade	-
20th-Century Orchestral	-	-	-	Riccardo Chailly – Varèse: Complete Orchestral Works	-
20th-Century Vocal	-	-	-	Matthias Goerne with Eric Schneider – Eisler: Hollywood Songbook	-
Artist of the Year	Anne Sofie von Otter	Yo-Yo Ma	Riccardo Chailly	Martha Argerich	Antonio Pappano
Baroque Instrumental	-	-	-	Carole Cerasi – Jacquet de la Guerre: Premier livre	Richard Egarr, Andrew Manze – Pandolfi: Violin Sonatas Opuses 3 & 4
Baroque Non-Vocal	Giovanni Antonini conducting Il Giardino Armonico, Christophe Coin – Vivaldi: Il Proteo, Double, Triple Concertos	Phantasm, Susanna Pell, Joanna Levine – Purcell: Fantazias	Christophe Rousset conducting Les Talens Lyriques – Rameau: Overtures	-	-
Baroque Vocal	Chiara Banchini conducting the Harmonia Mundi, Ensemble 415, Andreas Scholl – Vivaldi: Stabat Mater, Cessate, omai cessate	René Jacobs conducting Harmonia Mundi, Schola Cantorum Basiliensis – Caldara: Maddalena ai piedi di Cristo	Rinaldo Alessandrini conducting Concerto Italiano – Monteverdi	René Jacobs conducting Harmonia Mundi – Scarlatti: Il primo omicidio	William Christie conducting Les Arts Florissants – Handel: Acis and Galatea
Best-Selling Disc	Crouch End Festival Chorus, Royal Philharmonic Orchestra, Lesley Garrett – Garrett: Soprano in Red	Edward Higginbottom conducting the Choir of New College Oxford – Agnus Dei	James Horner – Titanic: Music from the Motion Picture	-	-
Britannia Music Members' Award	-	Paul Daniel conducting the Chorus and Orchestra of Opera North, Bryn Terfel – Something Wonderful: Bryn Terfel sings Richard Rodgers (1996)	-	-	-
Chamber	Quatuor Mosaïques – String Quartets, Op. 33, nos. 2, 3, & 5	Pascal Rogé, Truls Mørk, Chantal Juillet – Ravel: Violin Sonatas, etc.	Takács Quartet – Bartók: String Quartets	Florestan Trio – Schumann: Piano Trios	Emerson Quartet – Shostakovich – Complete String Quartets, nos. 1–15
Choral	John Eliot Gardiner conducting the English Country Gardiner Orchestra, Monteverdi Choir – Grainger: Songs and Dancing Ballads	John Eliot Gardiner conducting the English Baroque Soloists, Monteverdi Choir – Haydn: Die Schöpfung	James O'Donnell conducting the Westminster Cathedral Choir, Frank Martin, Ildebrando Pizzetti – Haydn: Die Schöpfung	-	Yan Pascal Tortelier conducting the BBC Philharmonic Orchestra, CBSO Chorus, Lynne Dawson, Ann Murray, Bonaventura Bottone, Neil Mackenzie, Jason Howard – Boulanger: Faust et Hélène, Psaume 24, D'un soir triste, D'un matin de printemps, Psaume 130, Du fond de l'abîme
Classic FM People's Choice Award	-	-	-	-	Riccardo Chailly conducting the Orchestra Sinfonica di Milano Giuseppe Verdi, Angela Gheorghiu – Verdi: Heroines
Concerto	Lawrence Foster conducting the City of Birmingham Symphony Orchestra, Stephen Hough – Sauer: Piano Concerto No. 1, Scharwenka: Piano Concerto No. 4 in F minor, Op. 82	Simon Rattle conducting the City of Birmingham Symphony Orchestra, Thomas Zehetmair, Silke Avenhaus – Szymanowski: Violin Concertos, etc.	David Zinman conducting the Baltimore Symphony Orchestra, Joshua Bell, Samuel Barber, Ernest Bloch	Charles Dutoit, Martha Argerich – Chopin: Piano Concertos	Leif Ove Andsnes, Norwegian Chamber Orchestra – Haydn: Piano Concertos Nos. 3, 4, & 11
Contemporary	Elgar Howarth conducting The Royal Opera – Birtwistle: Gawain	Pierre-Laurent Aimard – Ligeti: Études	Andrew Davis and Martyn Brabbins conducting the BBC Symphony Orchestra, BBC Singers – The Mask of Orpheus	Oliver Knussen – Takemitsu: Quotation of Dream	Elliott Carter – Carter: Symphonia: sum fluxae pretium spei, Clarinet Concerto
Early Music	Orlando Consort – Dunstaple: Sacred Choral Works	Edward Wickham conducting The Clerks' Group – Ockeghem: Requiem	Dominique Visse, Ensemble Clément Janequin – Canciones y Ensaladas	Andrew Kirkman conducting the Binchois Consort – Dufay: Missa Sancti Iacobi	Davitt Moroney – Byrd: Complete Keyboard Works
Early Opera	Nicholas McGegan conducting the Freiburger Barockorchester, Wilhelmshaven Vocal Ensemble – Handel: Ariodante	William Christie conducting Les Arts Florissants – Rameau: Hippolyte et Aricie	William Christie conducting Les Arts Florissants – Rameau, Les fêtes d'Hébé	-	-
Editor's Choice	-	Monica Huggett – Bach: Sonatas and Partitas for solo violin	Thomas Adès conducting the Endellion Quartet, London Sinfonietta, Choir of King's College, Cambridge, Markus Stenz, Stephen Cleobury – Adès: Arcadiana	Naxos's British music series	-
Engineering	Osmo Vänskä conducting the Lahti Symphony Orchestra – Sibelius: Symphony No 5, En saga	Richard Hickox conducting the London Symphony Chorus, Orchestra – Dyson: The Canterbury Pilgrims	-	-	-
Film Music	-	Joel McNeely conducting the Royal Scottish National Orchestra – Herrmann: Vertigo	Kenneth Alwyn conducting the Royal Ballet Sinfonia – Alwyn: The Ladykillers: Music from Those Glorious Ealing Films	-	-
Historic Non-Vocal	Walter Gieseking – Debussy: Complete Piano Works	-	-	-	-
Historic Vocal	Lucrezia Bori – Bori: Opera and Operetta Arias (restored by Ward Marston)	-	-	-	-
Instrumental	Mikhail Pletnev – Scarlatti: Keyboard Sonatas	Murray Perahia – Handel, Scarlatti: Keyboard Suites and Sonatas	Stephen Hough – Mompou	Arcadi Volodos – Arcadi Volodos Live at Carnegie Hall	Marc-André Hamelin – Godowsky: The Complete Studies on Chopin's Études
Lifetime Achievement	Yehudi Menuhin	Mstislav Rostropovich	Menahem Pressler	Isaac Stern	Carlo Bergonzi
Music Theatre	Eric Stern conducting the Orchestra of St. Luke's – Gershwin: Oh, Kay!	John Owen Edwards conducting the National Symphony Orchestra – Lerner & Loewe: My Fair Lady	Rob Fisher, Broadway cast – Kander & Ebb: Chicago	-	-
Opera	Valery Gergiev conducting the Kirov Opera – Prokofiev: The Fiery Angel	Antonio Pappano conducting the London Symphony Orchestra, London Voices – Puccini: La rondine	Riccardo Chailly conducting the La Scala Chorus and Orchestra – Rossini: Il turco in Italia	Charles Mackerras – Antonín Dvořák: Rusalka	Simon Rattle conducting the City of Birmingham Symphony Orchestra, CBSO Chorus, CBSO Youth Orchestra, Leif Ove Andsnes – Szymanowski: King Roger, Symphony No. 4
Orchestral	Franz Welser-Möst conducting the London Philharmonic Orchestra – Schmidt: Symphony No. 4, Variations on a Hussar Song	Colin Davis conducting the London Symphony Orchestra – Sibelius: Symphony Nos. 1 & 2	Iván Fischer conducting the Budapest Festival Orchestra, Hungarian Radio Chorus – Bartók: The Miraculous Mandarin	Günter Wand – Symphony No. 4	Simon Rattle conducting the Berlin Philharmonic Orchestra – Mahler: Symphony No. 10 in F♯ major
Recital	-	-	-	James Levine, Renée Fleming – Fleming: "I Want Magic"	Riccardo Chailly conducting the Orchestra Sinfonica di Milano Giuseppe Verdi, Angela Gheorghiu – Verdi: Verdi: Heroines
Record of the Year	Lawrence Foster conducting the City of Birmingham Symphony Orchestra, Stephen Hough – Sauer: Piano Concerto No. 1, Scharwenka: Piano Concerto No. 4 in F minor, Op. 82 (Concerto)	Antonio Pappano conducting the London Symphony Orchestra, London Voices – Puccini: La rondine (Opera)	James O'Donnell conducting the Westminster Cathedral Choir, Frank Martin, Ildebrando Pizzetti – Haydn: Die Schöpfung (Choral)	Charles Mackerras – Antonín Dvořák: Rusalka (Opera)	Simon Rattle conducting the Berlin Philharmonic Orchestra – Mahler: Symphony No. 10 in F♯ major (Orchestral)
Retailer of the Year	-	-	-	-	HMV and Bath Compact Disc
Solo Vocal	Ian Bostridge with Dietrich Fischer-Dieskau, Graham Johnson – Schubert: Lieder, Vol. 25, Die schöne Müllerin	Christine Schäfer with Graham Johnson – Schumann: Complete Lieder, Vol. 1	Ian Bostridge with Julius Drake – Schumann	Stephan Genz with Roger Vignoles – Beethoven: Lieder	-
Special Achievement	-	-	-	Philips Records's Great Pianists of the 20th Century	Hans Knappertsbusch conducting the Bayreuth Festival Orchestra and Chorus -Wagner: Götterdämmerung
Video	Yehudi Menuhin – The Violin of the Century	Andrew Davis conducting the London Philharmonic Orchestra – Berg: Lulu	-	-	-
Vocal	-	-	-	-	Antonio Pappano, Barbara Bonney – Diamonds in the Snow
Young Artist of the Year	David Pyatt	Ewa Kupiec, Isabelle Faust – Bartók: Sonata for Violin and Piano No. 1, Sonata for Solo Violin	-	-	-

== 2001–2005 ==
Category	2001	2002	2003	2004	2005
Artist of the Year	Cecilia Bartoli	Maxim Vengerov	Marin Alsop	Magdalena Kožená	Michael Tilson Thomas
Baroque Instrumental	Trevor Pinnock – Bach: Partitas for keyboard	Monica Huggett, Thomas Guthrie – Biber: Violin Sonatas Nos. 2, 3, 5 & 7, Nisi Dominus, Passacaglia, Sonnerie	Rachel Podger conducting the Arte dei Suonatori – Vivaldi: La stravaganza	-	-
Baroque Vocal	Arnold Schoenberg Choir, Vienna Boys' Choir, Christoph Prégardien, Matthias Goerne, Christine Schäfer, Dorothea Röschmann, Bernarda Fink, Elisabeth von Magnus, Michael Schade, Markus Schäfer, Dietrich Henschel, Oliver Widmer – Bach St Matthew Passion, Evangelist	Konrad Junghänel conducting the Concerto Palatino, Cantus Cölln – Monteverdi: Selva morale e spirituale	Emmanuelle Haïm conducting the Le Concert d'Astrée – Handel: Arcadian Duets	Rinaldo Alessandrini conducting the Concerto Italiano – Vivaldi: Vespri Solenni per la Festa dell'Assunzione di Maria Vergine	John Eliot Gardiner conducting the Monteverdi Choir and Orchestra – Bach Cantatas Vol. 1
Chamber	Phantasy Quintet, Maggini Quartet, Garfield Jackson – Williams: String Quartets Nos. 1 & 2	Takács Quartet – Beethoven Three String Quartets, String Quartets, Op. 59, String Quartet in E♭, "Harp"	Zehetmair Quartet – Schumann: String Quartets Nos. 1 & 3	Takács Quartet – Beethoven: String Quartets, Op. 18	Takács Quartet – Beethoven: Late string quartets
Choral	Stephen Layton conducting Polyphony – Britten: Choral Dances from Gloriana, "Chorale after an Old French Carol", A Hymn to the Virgin, Sacred and Profane	Simon Rattle conducting the Berlin Philharmonic Orchestra, Ernst Senff Choir, MDR Leipzig Radio Symphony Orchestra, Berlin Radio Chorus, Karita Mattila, Anne Sofie von Otter, Thomas Moser, Philip Langridge, Thomas Quasthoff – Schoenberg: Gurre-Lieder	Richard Hickox conducting the Collegium Musicum 90 – Hummel: Masses	-	René Jacobs conducting the RIAS Kammerchor, Freiburger Barockorchester – Haydn: The Seasons
Classic FM Listeners' Choice Award	-	-	Cecilia Bartoli	Bryn Terfel	Plácido Domingo
Classic FM People's Choice Award	Riccardo Chailly conducting the Orchestra Sinfonica di Milano Giuseppe Verdi, Angela Gheorghiu – Verdi: Verdi: Heroines	-	-	-	-
Concerto	Pierre Boulez conducting the Cleveland Orchestra, Mitsuko Uchida – Schoenberg: Piano Concerto	Sakari Oramo conducting the City of Birmingham Symphony Orchestra, Stephen Hough – Saint-Saëns: Complete Works for Piano and Orchestra	Han-na Chang, Antonio Pappano, London Symphony Orchestra -- Symphony-Concerto (Prokofiev), Cello Sonata (Prokofiev)	Mariss Jansons conducting the Berlin Philharmonic Orchestra, Leif Ove Andsnes – Grieg: Piano Concerto, Schumann: Piano Concerto	Krystian Zimerman, Leif Ove Andsnes, Hélène Grimaud, Boulez – Bartók Piano Concertos Nos. 1–3
Contemporary	Pierre Boulez conducting the Ensemble intercontemporain – Boulez: Anthèmes II, Messagesquisse, Sur incises	Reinbert de Leeuw conducting the Arditti Quartet, Nash Ensemble, Claron McFadden – Birtwistle: Pulse Shadows	Ensemble Modern – Reich: City Life	City of Birmingham Symphony Orchestra – Adès: America: A Prophecy	Ensemble Modern – Birtwistle: Earth Dances
Debut Recording	Belcea Quartet – Debussy: String Quartet, Ravel: String Quartets, Dutilleux: String Quartets	Jonathan Lemalu with Roger Vignoles – Songs by Brahms, Fauré, Finzi, etc.	Simon Trpceski – Piano works by Prokofiev, Scriabin, Stravinsky, Tchaikovsky	-	-
DVD	Sylvain Cambreling conducting Staatskapelle Dresden, Vesselina Kasarova, Willard White – Berlioz: La damnation de Faust	Kent Nagano conducting Deutsches Symphonie-Orchester Berlin, Theatre of Voices, London Voices, Maîtrise de Paris Children's Choir, Dawn Upshaw, Lorraine Hunt Lieberson, Willard White; directed by Peter Sellars (stage), Peter Maniura (video) – John Adams: El Niño	-	-	John Eliot Gardiner directing the Monteverdi Choir, Orchestre Revolutionnaire et Romantique – Berlioz: Les Troyens
Early Music	Claudio Cavina conducting La Venexiana – Gesualdo: Madrigali libro quarto	Rinaldo Alessandrini conducting Concerto Italiano – Marenzio: Madrigals	Orlando Consort – The Call of the Phoenix: Rare 15th-century English Church Music	Phantasm – Gibbons: Viol consort	Peter Phillips conducting The Tallis Scholars – John Browne: Music from the Eton Choir Book
Editor's Choice	Christopher Hogwood conducting the Academy of Ancient Music, Cecilia Bartoli, David Daniels – Handel: Rinaldo	Marek Janowski conducting the Berlin Radio Symphony Orchestra, Soile Isokoski – Strauss: Four Last Songs	Simon Trpceski – Piano Works by Prokofiev, Scriabin, Stravinsky, Tchaikovsky	-	Andrew Litton conducting the Dallas Symphony Orchestra, Stephen Hough – Rachmaninoff: Piano Concertos, Rhapsody on a Theme of Paganini
Historic Archive	-	Great Conductors of the 20th Century: Ferenc Fricsay	-	-	-
Historic Reissue	-	Germaine Thyssens-Valentin – Fauré: Nocturnes	-	Édouard Lindenberg, Duparc conducting the Orchestre de la Société des Concerts du Conservatoire, Gérard Souzay, Jacqueline Bonneau – Mélodies by Chausson, Debussy, Ravel	-
Instrumental	Murray Perahia – Bach: Goldberg Variations	Leif Ove Andsnes – Grieg: Lyric Pieces (excerpts)	Murray Perahia – Chopin: 12 Études	-	-
Label of the Year	-	-	Harmonia Mundi	Telarc	Naxos
Lifetime Achievement	Victoria de los Ángeles	Mirella Freni	Leontyne Price	London Symphony Orchestra	Marilyn Horne
Opera	Antonio Pappano conducting the La Monnaie Symphony Orchestra and Chorus, Angela Gheorghiu, Roberto Alagna – Massenet: Manon	Ben Heppner, Michelle DeYoung, Petra Lang, Sara Mingardo, Peter Mattei, Stephen Milling, Kenneth Tarver, Toby Spence, Orlin Anastassov, Tigran Martirossian, Isabelle Cals, Alan Ewing, Yang Guang, Andrew Greenan, Roderick Earle, Bülent Bezdüz, London Symphony Orchestra – Berlioz: Les Troyens	Daniel Harding conducting the Mahler Chamber Orchestra, Ian Bostridge – Britten: The Turn of the Screw	René Jacobs conducting the Concerto Köln, Collegium Vocale Gent – Mozart: Le nozze di Figaro	-
Orchestral	Hickox conducting the London Symphony Orchestra – Williams: A London Symphony, Butterworth: The Banks of Green Willow	Günter Wand conducting the Berlin Philharmonic – Bruckner: Symphony No. 8	Osmo Vänskä conducting the Lahti Symphony Orchestra – Sibelius: Rondo of the Waves	Vernon Handley conducting BBC Philharmonic Orchestra – Bax – Symphonies	Nikolaus Harnoncourt conducting the Concentus Musicus Wien – Haydn: Paris symphonies
Recital	Bertrand de Billy conducting the Royal Opera House Orchestra, Roberto Alagna – French Arias	Bernhard Forck conducting the Akademie für Alte Musik Berlin, Cecilia Bartoli – Gluck: Italian Arias	-	-	Evelino Pidò conducting the Orchestre Philharmonique de Radio France, Rolando Villazón – Arias by Gounod and Massenet
Record of the Year	Hickox conducting the London Symphony Orchestra – Williams: A London Symphony, Butterworth: The Banks of Green Willow (Orchestral)	Sakari Oramo conducting the City of Birmingham Symphony Orchestra, Stephen Hough – Saint-Saëns: Complete Works for Piano and Orchestra (Concerto)	Zehetmair Quartet – Schumann: String Quartets Nos. 1 & 3 (Chamber Music)	René Jacobs conducting the Concerto Köln, Collegium Vocale Gent – Mozart: Le nozze di Figaro (Opera)	John Eliot Gardiner conducting the Monteverdi Choir and Orchestra – Bach Cantatas Vol. 1 (Baroque Vocal)
Retailer of the Year	Bath Compact Discs	-	-	-	-
Special Achievement Award	-	-	Vernon Handley	Peter Alward	The Lindsays
Vocal	Magdalena Kožená with Graham Johnson – Love Songs	Anne Sofie von Otter with Bengt Forsberg, Nils-Erik Sparf, Peter Jablonski – Chaminade: "Mots d'amour"	-	-	-

== 2006–2010 ==
Category	2006	2007	2008	2009	2010
Artist of the Year	Angela Hewitt	Julia Fischer	Hilary Hahn	The Sixteen	Joyce DiDonato
Baroque Instrumental	-	Richard Egarr conducting the Academy of Ancient Music – Handel: Concerti grossi	Trevor Pinnock conducting the European Brandenburg Ensemble – Bach: Brandenburg Concertos	Fretwork – Purcell – Complete Fantazias	La Serenissima – Vivaldi: "The French Connection
Baroque Vocal	-	John Butt conducting the Dunedin Consort & Players – Handel: Messiah	Claudio Cavina conducting La Venexiana – Monteverdi: L'Orfeo	-	-
Chamber	Mikhail Pletnev, Lynn Harrell, Nobuko Imai, Ilya Gringolts, Vadim Repin – Taneyev: Chamber Music	Pavel Haas Quartet – String Quartets by Haas, Janáček	Artemis Quartet, Leif Ove Andsnes – Piano Quintets by Brahms, Schumann	Ébène Quartet – Debussy: String Quartet, Fauré: String Quartet, Ravel: String Quartet	Isabelle Faust – Beethoven: Sonatas for Piano and Violin
Choral	-	Simon Rattle conducting the Berlin Philharmonic Orchestra, Berlin Radio Choir, Dorothea Röschmann, Thomas Quasthoff – Brahms: A German Requiem	Paul McCreesh conducting the Gabrieli Consort & Players – Haydn: The Creation	-	-
Classic FM Award for Audience Innovation	-	-	Tasmin Little	The Royal Opera, The Sun	-
Classic FM Listeners' Choice	Alison Balsom	-	-	-	-
Concerto	Antonio Pappano conducting the Berlin Philharmonic, Leif Ove Andsnes – Rachmaninoff: Piano Concertos Nos. 1 & 2	Riccardo Chailly conducting the Leipzig Gewandhaus Orchestra, Nelson Freire – Brahms: Piano Concertos	Andrew Davis conducting the Philharmonia Orchestra, James Ehnes – Elgar: Violin Concerto	Ilan Volkov conducting the BBC Scottish Symphony Orchestra – Britten: Piano Concerto	Mark Elder conducting the Hallé Orchestra, Thomas Zehetmair – Elgar: Violin Concerto
Contemporary	Sakari Oramo conducting the Finnish Radio Symphony Orchestra, Kari Kriikku – Lindberg: Clarinet Concerto	Oliver Knussen conducting the BBC Symphony Orchestra – Anderson: Alhambra Fantasy	Ilan Volkov conducting the BBC Scottish Symphony Orchestra, Anu Komsi – Harvey: Body Mandala	NMC Recordings – The NMC Songbook	Thomas Adès conducting The Royal Opera Orchestra and Chorus – Adès: The Tempest
DVD	Bernstein – Reflections (film by Peter Rosen)	Julian Bream: My Life in Music	Antonio Pappano conducting The Royal Opera – Mozart: Le nozze di Figaro	Michael Schønwandt conducting The Royal Danish Opera – Wagner: Der Ring des Nibelungen	-
Early Music	Andrew Carwood conducting The Cardinall's Musick – Tallis: Gaude gloriosa	Andrew Carwood conducting The Cardinall's Musick – Byrd: Laudibus in sanctis	Edward Higginbottom conducting the Choir of New College Oxford – Ludford: Missa Benedicta	Stile Antico – Song of Songs	Andrew Carwood conducting The Cardinall's Musick – Byrd: Infelix ego
Editor's Choice	Richard Hickox conducting the BBC National Orchestra of Wales, Gerald Finley – Stanford: Orchestral Songs	Ivan Fischer conducting Budapest Festival Orchestra – Mahler: Symphony No. 2	Susanne Heinrich – Mr Abel's Fine Airs	Stephen Kovacevich – Beethoven: Diabelli Variations, Bach: Partita No. 4	Marin Alsop – Bernstein: Mass
The Gold Disc	-	-	Stephen Hough – Saint-Saëns: Piano Concertos	-	-
Historic Archive	Joseph Keilberth conducting the Bayreuth Festival Opera – Wagner: Siegfried	Joseph Keilberth conducting the Bayreuth Festival Opera – Wagner: Götterdämmerung	Vaughan Williams conducting the London Philharmonic Orchestra – Williams: Symphony No. 5	Rafael Kubelík conducting The Royal Opera – Berlioz: Les Troyens	Friedrich Gulda – Beethoven: 32 Piano Sonatas, Eroica Variations, etc.
Historic Reissue	-	Sir Adrian Boult conducting the London Philharmonic Orchestra, New Philharmonia – Moeran: Symphony in G minor, etc.	Erik Werba, Kim Borg – Sibelius: Songs	-	-
Instrumental	Piotr Anderszewski – Szymanowski: Piano Works	Steven Isserlis – Bach: Cello Suites	Paul Lewis – Beethoven: Piano Sonatas, Vol. 4	-	-
Label of the Year	Virgin Classics	Deutsche Grammophon	Hyperion	ECM	Linn Records
Lifetime Achievement	Charles Mackerras	Montserrat Caballé	André Previn	Nikolaus Harnoncourt	Alfred Brendel
Opera	-	Riccardo Frizza – Rossini: Matilde di Shabran	Jirí Belohlávek conducting the BBC Symphony Orchestra – Janáček: The Excursions of Mr Broucek	Antonio Pappano conducting the Accademia Nazionale di Santa Cecilia, Angela Gheorghiu – Puccini: Madama Butterfly	Mark Elder conducting Hallé Orchestra – Wagner: Götterdämmerung
Orchestral	Claudio Abbado conducting the Berlin Philharmonic Orchestra – Mahler: Symphony No. 6	Valery Gergiev conducting the London Symphony Orchestra – Prokofiev: Complete Symphonies	Evgeny Svetlanov conducting the USSR State Symphony Orchestra, Russian Federation Symphony Orchestra – Myaskovsky: Symphonies	Vasily Petrenko conducting the Royal Liverpool Philharmonic – Tchaikovsky: Manfred Symphony, The Voyevoda	Charles Mackerras conducting the Czech Philharmonic – Dvořák: Symphonic Poems
Recital	-	Ulf Schirmer conducting the Munich Radio Orchestra – Keenlyside: Tales of Opera	Ádám Fischer conducting the Orchestra La Scintilla, Cecilia Bartoli – Maria	-	-
Record of the Year	Claudio Abbado conducting the Berlin Philharmonic Orchestra – Mahler: Symphony No. 6 (Orchestral)	Riccardo Chailly conducting the Leipzig Gewandhaus Orchestra, Nelson Freire – Brahms: Piano Concertos (Concerto)	Paul Lewis – Beethoven: Piano Sonatas, Vol. 4	Ébène Quartet – Debussy: String Quartet, Fauré: String Quartet, Ravel: String Quartet (Chamber)	Andrew Carwood conducting The Cardinall's Musick – Byrd: Infelix ego (Early Music)
Solo Vocal	Christian Gerhaher with Gerold Huber – Schubert: Abendbilder	Jonas Kaufmann with Helmut Deutsch – Strauss: Lieder	Gerald Finley with Julius Drake – Barber: Songs	-	-
Special Achievement	-	Christopher Raeburn	Peter Moores	Bernard Coutaz	-
Young Artist of the Year	-	Vasily Petrenko	Maxim Rysanov	Yuja Wang	Sol Gabetta

== 2011–2015 ==
Category	2011	2012	2013	2014	2015
Artist of the Year	Gustavo Dudamel	Joseph Calleja	Alison Balsom	Leonidas Kavakos	Paavo Järvi
Baroque Instrumental	Petra Müllejans conducting the Freiburg Baroque Orchestra, Andreas Staier – C. P. E. Bach: Harpsichord Concertos	Freiburg Baroque Orchestra, Gottfried von der Goltz, Petra Müllejans – C. P. E. Bach: Orchestral Suites	Andreas Staier – Froberger, D'Anglebert, Fischer, Couperin	Mahan Esfahani – C. P. E. Bach: Württemberg Sonatas	David Watkin – Bach: Cello Suites
Baroque Vocal	La Risonanza Glossa – Handel: Apollo e Dafne	Lionel Meunier, Vox Luminis – Schütz: Musikalische Exequien	John Eliot Gardiner conducting the Monteverdi Choir, English Baroque Soloists – Bach: Motets	Hans-Christoph Rademann conducting the Akademie für Alte Musik Berlin, RIAS Kammerchor, Elizabeth Watts, Wiebke Lehmkuhl, Lothar Odinius, Markus Eiche – C. P. E. Bach: Magnificat, Heilig ist Gott, Symphony in D major	Rinaldo Alessandrini conducting the Concerto Italiano – Monteverdi: Vespri solenni per la festa di San Marco
Chamber	Pavel Haas Quartet – Dvořák: Violin Sonata, American Quartet	Christian Tetzlaff, Tanja Tetzlaff, Leif Ove Andsnes – Schumann: Complete works for piano trio	Barnabás Kelemen, Zoltán Kocsis – Bartók: Violin Sonatas 1 & 2	Pavel Haas Quartet, Danjulo Ishizaka – Schubert: String Quintet D956, Death and the Maiden	Pavel Haas Quartet – Smetana: String Quartets Nos. 1 & 2
Choral	Mark Elder conducting the Hallé Orchestra & Choir, Claire Rutter, Susan Bickley, John Hudson, Iain Paterson – Elgar: The Kingdom	Stephen Layton conducting the Choir of Trinity College, Cambridge – Howells: St Paul's Service	Mark Elder conducting the Hallé Orchestra & Choir, Rebecca Evans, Alice Coote, Paul Groves, Jacques Imbrailo, David Kempster, Brindley Sherratt – Elgar: The Apostles	John Butt conducting the Dunedin Consort, Joanne Lunn, Rowan Hellier, Thomas Hobbs, Matthew Brook – Mozart: Requiem, Misericordias Domini	Andrew Davis conducting the BBC Symphony Orchestra and Chorus, Sarah Connolly, Stuart Skelton, David Soar – Elgar: The Dream of Gerontius, Sea Pictures
Concerto	Yan Pascal Tortelier conducting the BBC Symphony Orchestra, Jean-Efflam Bavouzet – Debussy: Fantaisie, Ravel: Piano Concertos, Massenet: Piano Works	Claudio Abbado conducting the Orchestra Mozart, Isabelle Faust – Violin Concertos by Beethoven and Berg	Peter Eötvös conducting the Ensemble Modern, Frankfurt Radio Symphony, Patricia Kopatchinskaja – Bartók: Violin Concerto No. 2, Eötvös: Seven, Ligeti: Violin Concerto	Gianandrea Noseda conducted BBC Philharmonic Orchestra, Jean-Efflam Bavouzet – Prokofiev: Complete Piano Concertos	Daniel Harding conducting the Swedish Radio Symphony Orchestra, Maria João Pires – Beethoven: Piano Concertos Nos. 3 & 4
Contemporary	Ryan Wigglesworth conducting the Hallé Orchestra – Birtwistle: Night's Black Bird	John Storgårds conducting the Helsinki Philharmonic Orchestra, Colin Currie, Truls Mørk – Rautavaara: Incantations, Towards the Horizon, Modificata	Esa-Pekka Salonen conducting the Orchestre Philharmonique de Radio France, Barbara Hannigan, Anssi Karttunen – Dutilleux: Correspondances	Benjamin conducting The Royal Opera, Christopher Purves, Barbara Hannigan, Bejun Mehta, Victoria Simmonds, Allan Clayton; directed by Katie Mitchell (stage) and Margaret Williams (video) – Benjamin: Written on Skin (DVD)	Sakari Oramo conducting the Vienna Philharmonic – Nørgård: Symphony Nos. 1 & 8
DVD Documentary	Carlos Kleiber – Traces to Nowhere	Jerome Hiler – Music Makes a City	-	-	-
DVD Performance	Antonio Pappano conducting The Royal Opera and Chorus – Verdi: Don Carlos	Claudio Abbado conducting the Lucerne Festival Orchestra – Bruckner: Symphony No. 5	-	-	-
Early Music	Robert Hollingworth conducting I Fagiolini – Striggio: Mass in Forty Parts	Michael Noone conducting Ensemble Plus Ultra – Victoria: Sacred Works	Paul McCreesh conducting the Gabrieli Consort & Players – A New Venetian Coronation 1595	La Compagnia del Madrigale – Marenzio: Primo libro di madrigali	David Skinner, English Cornett and Sackbut Ensemble – 'The Spy's Choirbook
Editor's Choice	Antonio Pappano conducting the Santa Cecilia Orchestra & Chorus, Anna Netrebko – Rossini: Stabat Mater	-	-	-	-
Historic	Berthold Goldschmidt conducting the London Symphony Orchestra, Philharmonia Orchestra – Mahler/Cooke: Symphony No. 10	Maurizio Pollini – Chopin: Études	-	-	-
Instrumental	Murray Perahia – Brahms: Handel Variations, Six Pieces for Piano, Four Pieces for Piano	Benjamin Grosvenor – Piano Works by Chopin, Liszt, Ravel	Steven Osborne – Mussorgsky: Pictures from an Exhibition, Prokofiev: Sarcasms, Visions fugitives	Arcadi Volodos – "Volodos plays Mompou"	Piotr Anderszewski – Bach: English Suites Nos. 1, 3 & 5
Label of the Year	Wigmore Hall Live	Naïve Records	Decca Classics	Delphian Records	Channel Classics
Lifetime Achievement Award	Janet Baker	Claudio Abbado	Julian Bream	James Galway	Bernard Haitink
Music in the Community Award	The Cobweb Orchestra	-	-	-	-
Opera	David Parry conducting the London Philharmonic Orchestra, Geoffrey Mitchell Choir – Rossini: Ermione	Claudio Abbado conducting the Lucerne Festival Orchestra, Nina Stemme, Jonas Kaufmann – Beethoven: Fidelio	Antonio Pappano conducting The Royal Opera and Chorus, Eva-Maria Westbroek, Ermonela Jaho, Lucio Gallo, Elena Zilio, Francesco Demuro, Richard Jones – Puccini: Il trittico (DVD)	Kazushi Ono conducting the Glyndebourne Chorus, London Philharmonic Orchestra, Stéphanie d'Oustrac, François Piolino, Elliot Madore, Paul Gay, Khatouna Gadelia, Elodie Méchain; directed by Laurent Pelly (stage) and François Roussillon (video) – Ravel: L'heure espagnole, L'enfant et les sortilèges (DVD)	Esa-Pekka Salonen conducting the Orchestre de Paris; directed by Patrice Chéreau (stage) and Stéphane Metge (video) – Strauss: Elektra
Orchestral	Vasily Petrenko conducting the Royal Liverpool Philharmonic – Shostakovich: Symphony No. 10	Jiri Belohlavek conducting the BBC Symphony Orchestra – Martinu: Symphonies	Jiri Belohlavek conducting the BBC Symphony Orchestra – Suk: Praga, A Summer's Tale	Riccardo Chailly conducting the Leipzig Gewandhaus Orchestra – Brahms: Symphonies	Claudio Abbado conducting the Lucerne Festival Orchestra – Bruckner: Symphony No. 9
Outstanding Achievement Award	-	-	-	-	Neville Marriner
Recital	Antonio Pappano conducting the Santa Cecilia Orchestra & Choir, Jonas Kaufmann – Verismo Arias	-	-	Richard Egarr conducting Wigmore Hall Live, Iestyn Davies – Arise, my muse	Jeffrey Skidmore conducting the Ex Cathedra, Carolyn Sampson – A French Baroque Diva
Record of the Year	Pavel Haas Quartet – Dvořák: Violin Sonata, American Quartet (Chamber)	Lionel Meunier, Vox Luminis – Schütz: Musikalische Exequien (Baroque Vocal)	Peter Eötvös conducting the Ensemble Modern, Frankfurt Radio Symphony, Patricia Kopatchinskaja – Bartók: Violin Concerto No. 2, Eötvös: Seven, Ligeti: Violin Concerto (Concerto)	Riccardo Chailly conducting the Leipzig Gewandhaus Orchestra – Brahms: Symphonies (Orchestral)	Claudio Abbado conducting the Lucerne Festival Orchestra – Bruckner: Symphony No. 9
Solo Vocal	Gerald Finley with Julius Drake – Britten: Songs and Proverbs of William Blake	Simon Keenlyside with Malcolm Martineau – Britten: Songs of War	-	-	Christian Gerhaher with Gerold Huber – Schubert: Nachtviolen
Special Achievement	The Bach Cantata Pilgrimage on SDG	Václav Talich conducting the Czech Philharmonic Orchestra – Czech National Anthem, Smetana: Má vlast (Historical Norwegian Radio recording in Nazi-occupied Prague on 5 June 1939; remastered by Matouš Vlčinský, Supraphon)	-	-	-
Specialist Classical Chart	Miloš Karadaglić – The Guitar	-	-	-	-
Vocal	-	-	Donald Runnicles conducting the Deutsche Oper Berlin, Jonas Kaufmann – Wagner: Arias	Jonas Kaufmann with Helmut Deutsch – Schubert: Winterreise	-
Young Artist of the Year	Miloš Karadaglić	Benjamin Grosvenor	Jan Lisiecki	Nightingale String Quartet	Joseph Moog

== 2016–2020 ==
Category	2016	2017	2018	2019	2020
Anniversary Award	Classic FM	-	-	-	-
Artist of the Year	Daniil Trifonov	Vasily Petrenko	Rachel Podger	Víkingur Ólafsson	Igor Levit
Baroque Instrumental	Rachel Podger with Jonathan Manson, David Miller, Marcin Świątkiewicz – Biber: Rosary Sonatas	Adrian Chandler, La Serenissima – The Italian Job	-	-	-
Baroque Vocal	Paul Agnew conducting Les Arts Florissants – Monteverdi: Madrigali, Vol 1 – Cremona	Jonathan Cohen conducting Arcangelo, Iestyn Davies – Bach: Cantata Nos. 54, 82, & 170	-	-	-
Beethoven 250 Award	-	-	-	-	Andrew Manze conducting the Deutsches Symphonie-Orchester Berlin, Martin Helmchen – Beethoven: Piano Concerto Nos. 2 & 5
Chamber	The Heath Quartet – Tippett: String Quartets	Silesian String Quartet – Bacewicz: Complete String Quartets	Pavel Haas Quartet, Boris Giltburg, Pavel Nikl – Dvořák: Quintets 2 & 3	Isabelle Faust, Alexander Melnikov, Tanguy de Williencourt, Magali Mosnier, Antoine Tamestit, Xavier de Maistre, Jean-Guihen Queyras, Javier Perianes – Debussy: Les Trois Sonates: The Late Works	Vilde Frang, Barnabás Kelemen, Katalin Kokas, Lawrence Power, Nicolas Altstaedt, Alexander Lonquich – Bartók: Piano Quintet, Veress: Piano Trio
Choral	Markus Stenz conducting the Netherlands Female Youth Choir, Cologne Cathedral Choir, Male Voices and Vocal Ensemble, Bach-Verein Köln, Kartäuserkantorei Köln, Gürzenich Orchestra Cologne, Barbara Haveman, Claudia Mahnke, Brandon Jovanovich, Gerhard Siegel, Thomas Bauer, Johannes Martin Kränzle – Schoenberg Gurrelieder	Masaaki Suzuki conducting Bach Collegium Japan, Carolyn Sampson, Olivia Vermeulen, Makoto Sakurada, Christian Immler – Mozart: Mass in C minor, Exsultate, jubilate	Kaspars Putniņš conducting the Estonian Philharmonic Chamber Choir – Pärt: Magnificat, Nunc dimittis; Schnittke: Psalms of Repentance	Lionel Meunier conducting Vox Luminis, Ensemble Masques, Olivier Fortin – Buxtehude: Abendmusiken	Masaaki Suzuki conducting Bach Collegium Japan – Bach: St Matthew Passion
Concept Album of the Year	-	-	Sean Shibe – softLOUD: Music for Acoustic and Electric Guitars (Delphian Records)	Hugo Ticciati conducting O/Modernt Chamber Orchestra – From the Ground Up: The Chaconne (Signum Classics)	
Concerto	James Gaffigan conducting the Frankfurt Radio Symphony Orchestra, Vilde Frang – Britten: Violin Concertos, Korngold: Violin Concerto	Giovanni Antonini conducting Il Giardino Armonico, Isabelle Faust – Mozart: Violin Concertos Nos. 1–5, Adagio, Rondos K269 & K373	Hannu Lintu conducting the Finnish Radio Symphony Orchestra, Christian Tetzlaff – Bartók: Violin Concerto Nos. 1 & 2	Vladimir Jurowski conducting the London Philharmonic Orchestra, Glyndebourne Chorus, Allan Clayton, Sarah Connolly, Barbara Hannigan, Rod Gilfry, Kim Begley, John Tomlinson, Jacques Imbrailo – Dean: Hamlet	Elim Chan conducting the Royal Scottish National Orchestra, Benjamin Grosvenor – Chopin: Piano Concertos
Contemporary	Andris Nelsons conducting the Bavarian Radio Symphony Orchestra, Barbara Hannigan – Abrahamsen: let me tell you	George Benjamin conducting the Bavarian Radio Symphony Orchestra, Pierre-Laurent Aimard – Benjamin: Palimpsests, Ligeti: Lontano, Murail: Le désenchantement du monde	Pascal Rophé conducting the Orchestre philharmonique de Radio France, Arditti Quartet – Dusapin: String Quartets Nos. 6 & 7	-	Thomas Adès conducting the Boston Symphony Orchestra, Kirill Gerstein, Mark Stone, Christianne Stotijn – Adès: Piano Concerto, Totentanz
Early Music	Andrew Parrott conducting the Taverner Choir & Players – Taverner: The Western Wynde Mass	Phantasm, Elizabeth Kenny – Dowland: Lachrimae, or Seaven Teares	Scott Metcalfe, Blue Heron – Music from the Peterhouse Partbooks, Vol 5	Luís Toscano conducting the Cupertinos – Cardoso – Requiem Lamentations, Magnificat and Motets	Gesualdo (composer) Paul Agnew conducting Les Arts Florissants – Gesualdo: Madrigali, Libri primo & secondo
Instrumental	Levit: Goldberg Variations, Diabelli Variations Rzewski: The People United Will Never Be Defeated!	Murray Perahia – Bach: French Suites	Arcadi Volodos – Brahms: Die Himmel erzählen die Ehre Gottes, Sei Lob und Ehr dem höchsten Gut, O Jesu Christ, meins Lebens Licht	Yuja Wang – The Berlin Recital	Levit – Complete Piano Sonatas
Label of the Year	Warner Classics	Signum Classics	Harmonia Mundi	Pentatone	Alpha Classics
Lifetime Achievement	Christa Ludwig	Dame Kiri Te Kanawa	Neeme Järvi	Emma Kirkby	Itzhak Perlman
Opera	Antonio Pappano conducting the Orchestra dell'Accademia Nazionale di Santa Cecilia, Anja Harteros, Jonas Kaufmann, Ekaterina Semenchuk, Ludovic Tézier, Erwin Schrott, Marco Spotti, Eleonora Buratto, Paolo Fanale – Verdi: Aida	-	-	Chœur de la radio flamande, Orchestre de chambre de Paris, Hervé Niquet – Halévy: La reine de Chypre	Maxim Emelyanychev conducting the Il Pomo d'Oro, Joyce DiDonato – Handel: Agrippina
Orchestra of the Year	-	-	Seattle Symphony	Hong Kong Philharmonic Orchestra	Philadelphia Orchestra
Orchestral	Andris Nelsons conducting the Boston Symphony Orchestra – Shostakovich: Symphony No. 10	Giovanni Antonini conducting the Il Giardino Armonico, Riccardo Novaro – Haydn: Il Distratto, Haydn 2032 – No. 4	François-Xavier Roth conducting the Les Siècles, Ensemble Aedes – Ravel: Daphnis et Chloé	Sakari Oramo conducting the Vienna Philharmonic – Langgaard: Symphony Nos. 2 & 6	-
Recital	Raphaël Pichon conducting the Pygmalion, Arnaud de Pasquale, Sabine Devieilhe – Mozart & The Weber Sisters	Maxim Emelyanychev conducting the Il Pomo d'Oro, Joyce DiDonato – In War & Peace	Ottavio Dantone conducting the Accademia Bizantina, Delphine Galou – Agitata	Philippe Jaroussky conducting the Ensemble Artaserse – Cavalli: Ombra mai fu	Julien Chauvin conducting Le Concert de la Loge, Sandrine Piau
Recording of the Year	Levit: Goldberg Variations, Diabelli Variations Rzewski: The People United Will Never Be Defeated! (Instrumental)	Giovanni Antonini conducting Il Giardino Armonico, Isabelle Faust – Mozart: Violin Concertos Nos. 1–5, Adagio, Rondos K269 & K373 (Concerto)	John Nelson conducting the Orchestre philharmonique de Strasbourg, Joyce DiDonato, Michael Spyres, Marie-Nicole Lemieux – Berlioz: Les Troyens (Opera)	Orchestre National de France, Bertrand Chamayou – Saint-Saëns: Piano Concerto Nos. 2 & 5 (Concerto)	Mirga Gražinytė-Tyla conducting the City of Birmingham Symphony Orchestra, Kremerata Baltica – Weinberg: Symphony Nos. 2 & 21 (Orchestral)
Solo Vocal	Véronique Gens with Susan Manoff – Néère	Matthias Goerne with Christoph Eschenbach – Lieder und Gesänge (Op. 32), Vier ernste Gesänge, Lieder nach Gedichten von Heinrich Heine	Marianne Crebassa with Fazıl Say – Secrets	Christian Gerhaher with Gerold Huber – Schumann	Nicky Spence with Julius Drake – Janáček: The Diary of One Who Disappeared, etc.
Special Achievement	BBC Radio 3	Colin Matthews	-	-	Robert von Bahr
Young Artist of the Year	Benjamin Appl	Beatrice Rana	Lise Davidsen	Jakub Józef Orliński	Natalya Romaniw

== 2021–2025 ==
Category	2021	2022	2023	2024	2025
Artist of the Year	James Ehnes	Barbara Hannigan	Véronique Gens	Carolyn Sampson	Simon Rattle
Chamber	Takács Quartet, Garrick Ohlsson – Beach: Piano Quintet, Elgar: Piano Quintet	Ébène Quartet, Nicolas Altstaedt, Antoine Tamestit – Monk: "'Round Midnight"	Ébène Quartet, Antoine Tamestit – Mozart: String Quintet Nos. 3 & 4	Isabelle Faust, Anne-Katharina Schreiber, Antoine Tamestit, Jean-Guihen Queyras, Alexander Melnikov – Schumann: Piano Quartet, Piano Quintet	Krystian Zimerman, Maria Nowak, Katarzyna Budnik, Yuya Okamoto - Brahms: Piano Quartets Nos. 2 in A major and 3 in C minor
Choral	Richard Egarr conducting the Academy of Ancient Music Choir, Stefanie True, Helen Charlston, Gwilym Bowen, Morgan Pearse – Dussek: Messe Solemnelle	Raphaël Pichon conducting Pygmalion – Bach: St Matthew Passion	Sigvards Kļava conducting the Latvian Radio Choir: Cage: Choral Works	Paul McCreesh conducting Gabrieli Consort and Players, Gabrieli Roar, Polish National Youth Choir, Nicky Spence, Anna Stéphany, Andrew Foster-Williams – Elgar: The Dream of Gerontius	Raphaël Pichon conducting Pygmalion - Bach: Mass in B minor
Concept Album	Christian-Pierre La Marca – Cello 360	Das Freie Orchester Berlin, Jarkko Riihimäki, Emily D'Angelo – Enargeia	Helen Charlston, Toby Carr – Battle Cry: She Speaks	Bertrand Chamayou – Erik Satie, John Cage, James Tenney: Letter(s) to Erik Satie	George Xiaoyuan Fu: Colouring Book
Concerto	Vladimir Jurowski conducting the State Academic Symphony Orchestra of Russia, Alina Ibragimova, Yevgeny Svetlanov – Shostakovich: Violin Concertos	Kirill Petrenko, Daniel Harding, Alan Gilbert conducting the Berlin Philharmonic, Frank Peter Zimmermann – Bartók: Violin Concerto, Beethoven: Violin Concerto, Berg: Violin Concerto	Martyn Brabbins conducting the BBC Symphony Orchestra, Timothy Ridout – Elgar: Viola Concerto, Bloch: Suite for Viola and Orchestra	Jakub Hrůša conducting Bavarian Radio Symphony Orchestra, Isabelle Faust – Britten: Violin Concerto	Robin Ticciati conducting the Deutsches Symphonie-Orchester Berlin, Vilde Frang - Elgar: Violin Concerto
Contemporary	Martyn Brabbins conducting the Nash Ensemble, Susan Bickley – Pickard: The Gardener of Aleppo, etc.	Cornelius Meister conducting the Bavarian State Orchestra and Chorus – Abrahamsen: The Snow Queen	Nicholas Collon conducting the Finnish Royal Symphony Orchestra, Sivan Magen – Wennäkoski: Sigla, Sedecim	Hannu Lintu, Ernest Martinez-Izquierdo conducting Orchestre philharmonique de Radio France, Chorus of Radio France; Olari Elts conducting Orchestre National de France; Davóne Tines, Anssi Karttunen, Olivier Latry – Kaija Saariaho: Maan varjot, Château de l'âme, True Fire, Offrande	George Benjamin conducting the Mahler Chamber Orchestra - Benjamin: Picture a day like this
Early Music	Peter Phillips conducting The Tallis Scholars – Josquin: Masses, Missa Hercules Dux Ferrariae, Missa D'ung aultre amer, Missa Faisant regretz	Jean-Christophe Groffe conducting Ensemble Thélème – Josquin: Baisé moy, ma doulce amye	Paul Van Nevel conducting the Huelgas Ensemble: Daser: Polyphonic Masses	Stratton Bull conducting Cappella Pratensis – Jacob Obrecht: Missa Maria zart	Agnieszka Budzińska-Bennett conducting Ensemble Dragma and Ensemble Peregrina - The Krasiński Codex
Instrumental	Sean Shibe – Bach: Lute Suites	James Ehnes – Ysaÿe: Six Sonatas for solo violin	Nurit Stark – Bartók, Eötvös, Ligeti, Veress: Music for Solo Violin and Viola	Hilary Hahn – Ysaÿe: Six Sonatas for solo violin	María Dueñas - Paganini: 24 Caprices
Label of the Year	Deutsche Grammophon	Chandos Records	BIS Records	Opera Rara	Palazzetto Bru Zane
Lifetime Achievement	Gundula Janowitz	Daniel Barenboim	Felicity Lott	Michael Tilson Thomas	Thomas Allen
Opera	Edward Gardner conducting the Bergen Philharmonic Orchestra and Choir, Stuart Skelton, Erin Wall, Roderick Williams, Susan Bickley, Catherine Wyn-Rogers, Robert Murray, James Gilchrist, Marcus Farnsworth – Britten: Peter Grimes	Kirill Petrenko conducting the Bavarian State Opera – Korngold: Die tote Stadt	Edward Gardner conducting the London Philharmonic Orchestra and Choir, English National Opera Chorus, Robert Murray, Rachel Nicholls, Ashley Riches, Jennifer France, Toby Spence, Claire Barnett-Jones, Susan Bickley, Joshua Bloom – Tippett: The Midsummer Marriage	Jakub Hrůša conducting Vienna Philharmonic, Vienna State Opera Chorus, Corinne Winters, Evelyn Herlitzius, David Butt Philip, Jaroslav Březina, Jarmila Balážová, Benjamin Hulett, Jens Larsen – Janáček: Káťa Kabanová	Edward Gardner conducting the Norwegian National Opera, Lise Davidsen, Gerald Finley - Wagner: Der fliegende Holländer
Orchestra of the Year	Minnesota Orchestra	Budapest Festival Orchestra	Deutsche Kammerphilharmonie Bremen	Czech Philharmonic	Bergen Philharmonic
Orchestral	Paavo Järvi conducting the Frankfurt Radio Symphony Orchestra – Schmidt: Complete Symphonies	Kirill Petrenko conducting the Bavarian State Opera – Mahler: Symphony No. 7	Fabio Luisi conducting the Danish National Symphony Orchestra – Nielsen: Symphony Nos. 4 & 5	Andrew Manze conducting Royal Liverpool Philharmonic – Vaughan Williams: Job: A Masque for Dancing, Old King Cole, The Running Set	Joana Mallwitz conducting the Konzerthausorchester Berlin - The Kurt Weill Album
Piano	Piotr Anderszewski – Bach: The Well-Tempered Clavier, Book 2 excerpts	Mitsuko Uchida – Beethoven: Diabelli Variations	Krystian Zimerman – Szymanowski: Piano Works	Yunchan Lim – Chopin: Études	Alexandre Kantorow - Brahms: Sonata No. 1, Schubert: Wanderer Fantasy
Recording of the Year	Edward Gardner conducting the Bergen Philharmonic Orchestra and Choir, Stuart Skelton, Erin Wall, Roderick Williams, Susan Bickley, Catherine Wyn-Rogers, Robert Murray, James Gilchrist, Marcus Farnsworth – Britten: Peter Grimes (Opera)	Kirill Petrenko conducting the Bavarian State Opera – Korngold: Die tote Stadt (Opera)	Fabio Luisi conducting the Danish National Symphony Orchestra – Nielsen: Symphony Nos. 4 & 5 (Orchestral)	Hilary Hahn – Ysaÿe: Six Sonatas for solo violin (Instrumental)	Raphaël Pichon conducting Pygmalion - Bach: Mass in B minor (Choral)
Song	Vision String Quartet, Tamer Pinarbasi, Henning Sieverts, Tim Allhoff, Itamar Doari, Burcu Karadağ, Rafael Aguirre, Fatma Said, Malcolm Martineau – "El Nour"	Asmik Grigorian, Lukas Geniušas – Rachmaninoff: "Dissonance"	Cyrille Dubois, Tristan Raës – Fauré: Complete Songs	Konstantin Krimmel, Daniel Heide – Schubert: Die schöne Müllerin	Robin Tritschler, Malcolm Martineau, et al - Songs for Peter Pears
Special Achievement	Boston Modern Orchestra Project	Leif Ove Andsnes, Mahler Chamber Orchestra – Mozart Momentum	-	-	-
Spatial Audio	Stile Antico – The Golden Renaissance: Josquin Des Prez	John Wilson conducting the Sinfonia of London – Ravel: Orchestral Works	Georg Solti conducting the Vienna Philharmonic – Wagner: Die Walküre	-	-
Voice & Ensemble	Ludovic Tézier with Frédéric Chaslin conducting the Teatro Comunale di Bologna Orchestra – Verdi	Michael Spyres with Marko Letonja conducting the Strasbourg Philharmonic Orchestra – BariTenor	Sandrine Piau, Véronique Gens with Julien Chauvin conducting Le Concert de la Loge – Rivales	Jonathan Tetelman with Carlo Rizzi conducting PKF – Prague Philharmonia – Puccini: The Great Puccini	Huw Montague Rendall with Ben Glassberg conducting the Opéra Orchestre Normandie Rouen - Contemplation
Young Artist of the Year	Fatma Said	Johan Dalene	Stella Chen	Yunchan Lim	María Dueñas

== See also ==
Category:Gramophone Award winners
