= Barnabás Kelemen =

Hungarian violinist

- Born: Barnabás Kelemen; 12 June 1978 (age 48); Budapest, Hungary
- Occupations: Violinist; Professor
- Instruments: Violin

Barnabás Kelemen (born June 12, 1978, Budapest) is a Hungarian violinist, chamber musician, and professor. He is the founder and artistic director of the Festival Academy Budapest and he co-established the Kelemen Quartet. His work has been recognized with the highest professional and state honors. He has been awarded Liszt, Bartók-Pásztory and Kossuth Prizes, Prima and the London-based Gramophone Awards and is the holder of the Knight's Cross of the Order of Merit of the Republic of Hungary.

== Early life and education ==
Kelemen began studying the violin under Valéria Baranyai. As a student of Eszter Perényi, he graduated from the Liszt Academy of Music in 2001. He was enormously influenced by his later masters, Isaac Stern (1994–2001), Ferenc Rados (1993–), and Zoltán Kocsis (1998–2016), and by the several recordings and movie films of his grandfather from the 1930s (legendary gypsy ‘prímás’ violinist Pali Pertis). He studied conducting from two legends of the Finnish school, Leif Segerstam and Jorma Panula.

== Career ==
Kelemen has established himself to be an artist of "innate musicality" with a technical execution that belongs "only to the greatest".

"...a penchant for fiery display and a lyricism suited to the stage, Barnabás Kelemen Hungarian soloist met the composer's demands unflappably, stirring a rousing ovation as the soloist of the American Symphony Orchestra in Carnegie Hall's Stern Auditorium."

Kelemen is "one of the leading violinists of his generation" and has performed at "major musical venues and festivals" worldwide. He has also held positions as artistic director of festivals, professor at academic institutions and, more recently, as a jury member at leading violin and chamber music contests.

Barnabás Kelemen is noted for his stylistic versatility and comprehensive technical command across a wide range of violin repertoire. His performances encompass solo, concerto, chamber, and string quartet literature, spanning periods from the early Baroque to contemporary music. He is particularly recognised for historically informed and stylistically adaptable interpretations across diverse musical traditions. Kelemen has also participated in world and Hungarian premieres of works by composers including Kurtág, Ligeti, Schnittke, Gubajdulina, Steve Reich or Ryan Wigglesworth.

He performed at the world's most prominent concert venues, including the Carnegie Hall, the Concertgebouw, the Royal Festival Hall, the Palais de Beaux Arts, the Suntory Hall, or the Berliner Philharmonie and is a frequent guest of ensembles such as the BBC Symphony, the London Philharmonic- and Symphony orchestras, the Amsterdam Royal Concertgebouw Orchestra, the Berlin Radio Symphony, Hannover's NDR Radiophilharmonie, the Budapest Festival Orchestra, the Hungarian National Philharmonic Orchestra, or the Helsinki Philharmonic Orchestra.

Barnabás Kelemen has worked with conductors such as Lorin Maazel, Sir Neville Marriner, Vladimir Jurowski, Marek Janowski, Michael Stern, Krzysztof Urbanski, Zoltán Kocsis, Péter Eötvös, and Iván Fischer. He is also a conductor himself, and has led the Hungarian National Philharmonic Orchestra, the Indianapolis Symphony Orchestra, the Austro- Hungarian Haydn Orchestra, the Dohnányi Symphony, and the Israel Chamber Orchestra or the Amsterdam Concertgebouw Chamber Orchestra.

He is a professor at the Ferenc Liszt Academy in Budapest where he coaches chamber music groups at regular masterclasses and teaches violin at the University of Cologne.

== Chamber Musician ==
Barnabás Kelemen is also a chamber musician who has been playing regularly together with artists like Zoltán Kocsis, Joshua Bell, Schlomo Mintz, Miklós Perényi, Ferenc Rados, Maxim Rysanov, Steven Isserlis, Alina Ibragimova, Nicolas Altstaedt, Vilde Frang, José Gallardo or Andreas Ottensamer at chamber music festivals such as: Edinburgh, Jerusalem, Prussia Cove, Salzburg, Graz, Delft, Lockenhaus, Mondsee, Mantova, Kuhmo, etc.

== Recordings ==
He recorded all of Bartók's works for violin in the Bartók New Series under the aegis of Zoltán Kocsis, and many received international acclaim, especially his CD comprising the complete sonatas for violin which won the prestigious Gramophone Award in 2013. In 2001, his album of Liszt's complete works for violin and piano was awarded the Grand Prix du Disque by the International Liszt Society, while in 2003, Diapason magazine paid tribute to Kelemen and Tamás Vásáry's recording of Brahms’ Sonatas for Violin and Piano with its influential Diapason d’Or. So far, he has released a total of 22 albums – 19 solo/chamber music and three with his quartet – as well as a double DVD of live performances of Mozart's complete violin concertos. His album - released in 2019 under the care of Alpha Records - featuring Béla Bartók's Piano Quintet won its category at the BBC Music Magazine Awards and the Gramophone Award in 2020.

== Pedagogue ==
A devoted pedagogue since 2003 he is active as a violin and chamber music teacher giving masterclasses world-wide. Since 2003 he had been professor of violin later chamber music at the Ferenc Liszt Music Academy in Budapest and worked as a regular guest professor at the Indiana University in Bloomington/USA. Since 2013 he is a violin professor at the Cologne University in Germany as a successor of Zakhar Bronn and Viktor Tretyakov. 2024 he started a professorship at Kunstuniversität Graz/ Austria. He has been giving masterclasses at renowned institutions like Salzburg Mozarteum, Brussels Chapelle Rheine Elizabeth and at universities of Tokyo, Paris, Glasgow, Dallas, Toronto, Helsinki, Antwerpen, Brussels, Florance etc.

Barnabás Kelemen has been invited as jury member to prestigious international violin and chamber music/string quartet competitions like: Singapore, Wieniawsky (Poland), Szigeti (Hungary), Kloster Schöntaal (Germany), Bartók (Hungary), or Banff (Canada). He himself established two international violin competitions one in 2017 for violinists under age 21 during the Festival Academy Budapest named after Ilona Fehér with jury president Shlomo Mintz and a Central- European violin competition since 2020 in Miskolc named after Jenő Hubay with jury president

Boris Kuschnir.

== Artistic Director ==
Together with Katalin Kokas, he is the founder and artistic director of the Festival Academy Budapest which regularly features artists such as Joshua Bell, Vilde Frang, Maxim Rysanov, Nicolas Alsteadt, Andreas Ottensamer, Alina Ibragimova, Shlomo Mintz, Ferenc Rados or Gidon Kremer and hosts 50-60 university students from all over the world for masterclasses and to work and perform with the festival artists.

== Founder of Kelemen Quartett ==
In 2009, Barnabás Kelemen established the Kelemen Quartet with his wife Katalin Kokas. In their first years, they won the grand prizes of three of the renowned string quartet competitions: the Premio Paolo Borciani in Reggio Emilia, the Melbourne and the Beijing competitions. They have helped to keep the attention of the international quartet audience with appearances at the NY Carnegie Hall, at the Berlin Philharmony, the Salzburg Mozarteum, the Vienna Musikverein, the Amsterdam Concertgebouw, the Teatro Fenice of Venice or at their yearly returns at the London Wigmore Hall since 2011. With their new members, violinist Jonian Ilias Kadesha and cellist Vashti Mimosa Hunter the quartet recently appeared with their grand undertaking of playing all Bartók string quartets at festivals like Mantova, Lockenhaus, Eisenstadt, Banff or Budapest Bartók Art Weeks Festival.

== Competitions and Awards ==
Kelemen has won first prizes at both the 1999 Salzburg International Mozart Violin Competition and the 2002 International Violin Competition of Indianapolis, and third prize at Brussels’ 2001 Queen Elisabeth Violin Competition. His artistry has been recognized with the highest professional and state honors: he has been awarded Liszt, Bartók-Pásztory and Kossuth Prizes, Prima and the London-based Gramophone Awards, and is the holder of the Knight's Cross of the Order of Merit of the Republic of Hungary.

== Personal life ==
With his wife and four children, Kelemen is building an arts-farm on a 13.000 square meter large land with three old houses in an 18 inhabited village in Lendvajakabfa. It hosts season-through masterclasses, camps, concerts, seminars, and recordings in its barn-concert-hall-theater. It accommodates up to 20 students in two persons apartments and up to four guest professors with their spouses in separate apartments. The Kokas-Kelemen couple plans to spend most of the time of their lives at their farm that opened in the spring of 2022.

== Violin ==
He performs on the “ex-Dénes Kovács” Guarneri del Gesú violin of 1742, generously loaned to him by the Hungarian State and on a period baroque violin made by Januarius Gagliano in 1771.
