= Arcadi Volodos =

Russian and French pianist (born 1972)

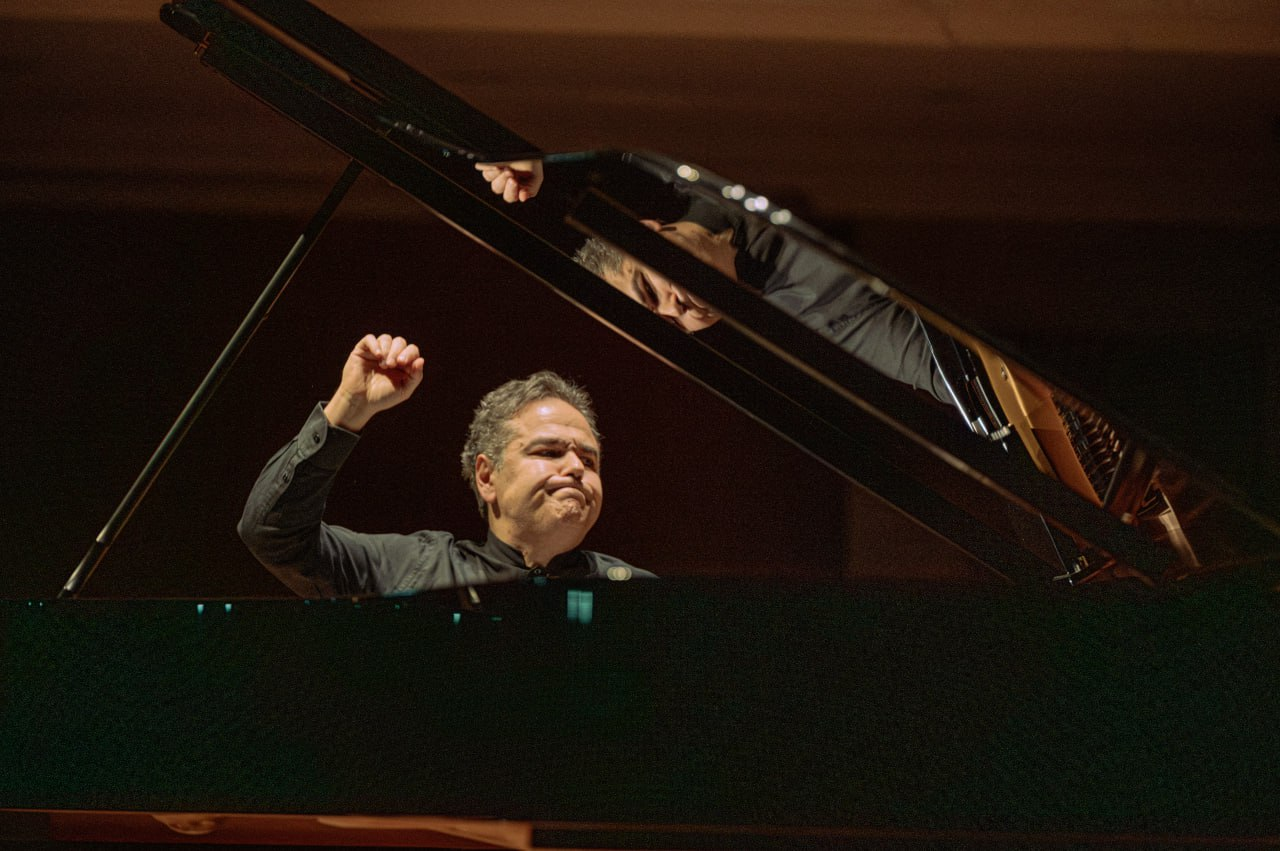
- Volodos at a concert in Basel

Background information
- Born: 24 February 1972 (age 54); Saint Petersburg, Russia
- Genres: Classical
- Occupation: Pianist
- Instruments: Piano
- Label: Sony Classical

Arcadi Arcadievich Volodos (Note: Russian: Арка́дий Арка́дьевич Володо́сь, romanized: Arkádij Arkádjevich Volodós’. His first name is sometimes transliterated Arcady or Arkady.) (born 24 February 1972) is a Russian and French pianist. Volodos has won a number of awards, including the Echo Klassik, Gramophone Award, Diapason d'Or, and Edison Award for his discography. He is widely regarded as one of the foremost virtuosos of his generation, known equally for his extraordinary technical command and his deeply expressive interpretations of the Romantic repertoire.

== Biography ==
Born in Leningrad in 1972, he began his musical training studying voice, following the example of his parents, who were singers, and later shifted his emphasis to conducting while a student at the Glinka Chapel School and the Saint Petersburg Conservatory. Though he had played the piano from the age of eight, he did not devote himself to serious study of the instrument until 1987. His path to the piano was notably unconventional. He never practiced scales systematically and, by his own account, received poor marks for technique during his early studies. On the advice of a teacher, he committed himself to the piano at age 16, later remarking, "It is not too late at 16. In the end it depends on how you deal with the music." His formal piano training took place at the Moscow Conservatory Music College with Galina Eguiazarova. Eguiazarova proved a decisive influence, impressing upon Volodos that virtuosity is only one part of great pianism and that a broader artistic vision, rooted in understanding each composer's aims, must govern technique rather than exist apart from it. Volodos also studied at the Paris Conservatory with Jacques Rouvier. In Madrid, he studied at the Reina Sofía School of Music with Dmitri Bashkirov and Galina Eguiazarova. He is of French nationality and resides in Spain with his wife and daughter.

Volodos has never participated in any of the major international piano competitions. His career began after a Sony Classical Records manager heard him play informally at a friend's home in the south of France and offered him a recording contract. His 1997 debut album, Volodos: Piano Transcriptions, won the German Record Critics' Award and was also named Gramophone's Editor's Choice and Classic CD's Disc of the Year, launching one of the most celebrated concert careers of his generation.

Volodos received the German award Echo Klassik as the best instrumentalist of 2003; he received the Gramophone Award for best instrumental recording in 1999 for Arcadi Volodos Live at Carnegie Hall, in 2010 for Volodos in Vienna, in 2014 for Volodos plays Mompou, and in 2018 for Volodos plays Brahms. He additionally received two Grammy Award nominations: one for his 1996 recording of piano transcriptions and another for his 1999 live recording of Rachmaninoff's Piano Concerto No. 3 with the Berlin Philharmonic Orchestra and James Levine.

== Artistic development and virtuosity ==
Despite his late formal start, Volodos developed with remarkable speed into a pianist of legendary technical ability. Critics have described his playing as combining "visceral excitement and unashamed virtuosity" with "refined poetry" and a "magical control of pedaling and finger-weighting." He himself has consistently resisted the virtuoso label, arguing that technical difficulty is largely a byproduct of unclear musical thinking: "Many people think only because there are really a lot of notes that the pieces have to be difficult. That is basically not the case. The big difficulties are in the musical form, it is really about achieving the correct sound image. Once you have this, you just have to play it back."

His earlier career was defined by breathtaking technical showmanship, evident in his debut recordings of Horowitz and Liszt transcriptions and his own concert paraphrases. Over the following two decades, his interpretive focus shifted progressively toward the introspective Romantic repertoire of Schubert, Schumann, Brahms, and Mompou, with critics noting an increasing depth of phrasing and emotional restraint alongside undiminished technical command. His 2022 and 2023 recitals at the Salzburg Festival, centered on Schubert and Schumann, were widely praised for their poetic virtuosity and structural insight. He has been called "the grandest of living classical pianists" by some critics for his Schubert interpretations in particular.

== Transcriptions ==
Volodos is celebrated not only as a performer but as a gifted arranger and transcriber, working in the tradition of Liszt, Horowitz, and Cziffra. His transcriptions are characterized by intricate passagework, expanded harmonic language, and structural reinterpretation that go beyond ornamentation, transforming their source material into independent concert works of high difficulty.

His most celebrated original transcription is the Concert Paraphrase on Mozart's Turkish March (Rondò Alla Turca, K. 331), in which he introduces elaborate arpeggios, added harmonic modulations, and a darker emotional palette while preserving the playful character of Mozart's original. The piece became widely known following its appearance on his 1997 debut recording and remains one of the most technically demanding piano paraphrases in the modern repertoire.

Other notable transcriptions and arrangements by Volodos include:

- Italian Polka by Sergei Rachmaninoff (arr. Volodos)
- Melody, Op. 21 No. 9 by Rachmaninoff (arr. Volodos) — reconstructed in part by ear from recordings
- Etincelles, Op. 36 No. 6 by Moritz Moszkowski (arr. Volodos)
- Variations on a Theme from Bizet's Carmen after Horowitz — reconstructed by Volodos from Horowitz's recordings, as Horowitz reportedly never committed his version to written score
- Hungarian Rhapsody No. 13 by Liszt (arr. Volodos)
- Utro, Op. 4 No. 2 by Sergei Rachmaninoff (arr. Volodos)
- How Fair This Spot, Op. 21 No. 7 by Rachmaninoff (transcr. Volodos for piano)
- Andante from Cello Sonata in G minor, Op. 19 by Rachmaninoff (arr. Volodos) — circulated as a Volodos transcription/reconstruction
- Étude de Virtuosité, Op. 72 No. 6 in F major by Moritz Moszkowski (arr. Volodos) — aural transcription from Volodos performance
- Variations on Aragonaise from Carmen by Georges Bizet / Vladimir Horowitz (arr. Volodos) — circulated as a Volodos/Horowitz reconstruction
- Hungarian Rhapsody No. 2 by Franz Liszt after Horowitz (Volodos performance version / adaptation)
- Variations on Mendelssohn's Wedding March from A Midsummer Night's Dream by Mendelssohn / Liszt / Horowitz (arr./adapted by Volodos)
- Berceuse / Lullaby in a Storm, Op. 54 No. 10 by Pyotr Ilyich Tchaikovsky (arr. Volodos)
- Spanish Dance No. 1 from La vida breve by Manuel de Falla (arr. Volodos) — circulated in multiple "as played by Volodos" versions
- Malagueña by Ernesto Lecuona (arr. Volodos) — circulated in multiple "as played by Volodos" versions
- O Polichinelo from A prole do bebê No. 1 by Heitor Villa-Lobos (arr. Volodos) — circulated in multiple "as played by Volodos" versions
- Variations on a Theme from Ruslan and Lyudmila by Mikhail Glinka (arr. Volodos) — circulated as a Volodos transcription/reconstruction
- Après une lecture du Dante by Franz Liszt (Volodos version/arrangement) — circulated as a Volodos performance transcription
- Vallée d'Obermann by Franz Liszt (Volodos version/arrangement) — booklet/review discussion notes the piece as effectively a Volodos-altered version, though not always formally credited that way
- Canciones becquerianas by Federico Mompou (arr. Volodos) — circulated as a Volodos transcription/reconstruction
- Combat del somni: "Damunt de tu només les flors" by Federico Mompou (arr. Volodos) — circulated as a Volodos transcription/reconstruction

Volodos has also recorded transcriptions by other arrangers, including Vladimir Horowitz's version of Liszt's Hungarian Rhapsody No. 2 and Samuil Feinberg's piano transcription of the Scherzo from Tchaikovsky's Symphony No. 6, as well as György Cziffra's arrangement of Rimsky-Korsakov's Flight of the Bumblebee. His approach to these borrowed transcriptions is to make the material his own, with distinct tempos and voicings rather than imitation of the originator's performance.

== Recordings ==
- Volodos: Piano Transcriptions (1997), Sony Classical
- Volodos, Live at Carnegie Hall (Recorded October 21, 1998, released 1999), Sony Classical
- Rachmaninoff: Piano Concerto No. 3 / Solo Piano Works (2000), Sony Classical
- Schubert: Solo Piano Works (2002), Sony Classical
- Tchaikovsky: Piano Concerto No. 1 / Rachmaninoff: Solo Piano Works (2003), Sony Classical
- Volodos Plays Liszt (2007), Sony Classical
- Volodos in Vienna (2010) Recorded live on March 1, 2009 (works of Scriabin, Ravel, Schumann and Liszt), Sony Classical
- Volodos plays Mompou (2013) Recorded October & December 2012, Sony Classical
- Volodos plays Brahms (2017), Sony Classical
- Volodos: Schubert Piano Sonata D.959 & Minuets D. 334, D. 335, D. 600 (2019), Sony Classical
