= Gerold Huber =

German classical pianist (born 1969)

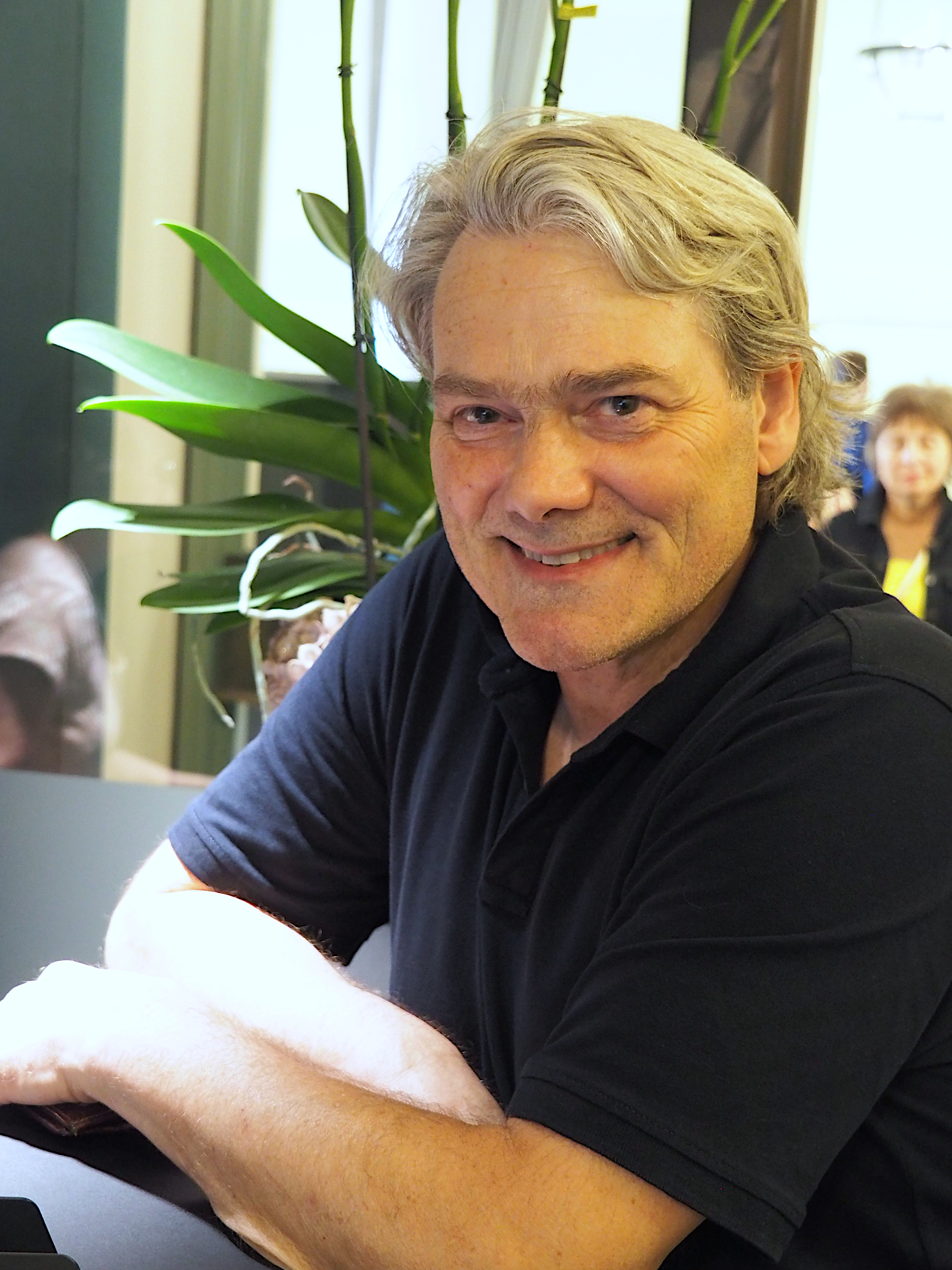
- Born: 1969 (age 56–57); Straubing, West Germany
- Education: Musikhochschule München
- Occupations: Classical pianist; Accompanist
- Awards: Echo Klassik 2002, 2004; Gramophone Award 2006

Gerold Huber (born 1969) is a German classical pianist, best known as the regular duo partner of baritone Christian Gerhaher and accompanist of other singers.

== Career ==
Born in Straubing, Huber studied on a scholarship at the Hochschule für Musik und Theater München, piano with Friedemann Berger and Lied accompaniment ("Liedgestaltung") with Helmut Deutsch. Together with the singer Christian Gerhaher, he attended a master class with Dietrich Fischer-Dieskau in Berlin.

Huber forms a duo with Christian Gerhaher and has also accompanied singers such as Ruth Ziesak, Franz-Josef Selig, Bernarda Fink, Cornelia Kallisch and Diana Damrau. He is the pianist of the "Liedertafel" founded in 2002 of James Taylor, Christian Elsner, Michael Volle and Franz-Josef Selig and has appeared with the Artemis Quartet.

At the Rheingau Musik Festival 2010 he accompanied Christian Gerhaher in a Gustav Mahler program of Sieben Lieder aus letzter Zeit (Seven Songs of Latter Days) and from Das Lied von der Erde the movements Der Einsame im Herbst (The Lonely One in Autumn) and Der Abschied (The Farewell).

== Awards ==
- 2006 Gramophone Award 2006 for "Abendbilder" with Christian Gerhaher
- 2004 German Phono Prize Echo Klassik in the category "Liedeinspielung" with Christian Gerhaher for Die Schöne Müllerin by Schubert
- 2002 German Phono Prize "Echo Klassik" in the category "Liedeinspielung" with Christian Gerhaher for Winterreise by Schubert
- 2001 Internationaler Klavierwettbewerb Johann Sebastian Bach Saarbrücken
- 1998 Prix International Pro Musicis Paris/New York with Christian Gerhaher

== Recordings ==
- Ludwig van Beethoven: Fantasie H-Dur, 6 Bagatellen, Sonate F-Dur, Russki Record München
- Johannes Brahms: Vier ernste Gesänge, Franz Schubert: Gesänge des Harfners and various Lieder, Frank Martin: Sechs Monologe aus Jedermann, Christian Gerhaher, Arte Nova, August 2002
- Joseph Haydn: Canzonetten, Ruth Ziesak, Capriccio
- Erich Kästner / Edmund Nick: Rezept zum Glücklichsein, chansons, Susanne Brantl, Russki Record München
- Erich Kästner / Edmund Nick: Das Leben ohne Zeitverlust, chansons, Susanne Brantl, Russki Record München
- Gustav Mahler: Kindertotenlieder, Christian Gerhaher, Lieder eines fahrenden Gesellen, Hyperion Ensemble, Arte Nova, February 2003
- Franz Schubert: Die Schöne Müllerin, Christian Gerhaher, ARTE NOVA
- Franz Schubert: Winterreise, Christian Gerhaher, ARTE NOVA
- Franz Schubert: Schwanengesang, Christian Gerhaher, ARTE NOVA
- Franz Schubert: Abendbilder (various Lieder), Christian Gerhaher, RCA, January 2006
- Franz Schubert: Lieder, Bernarda Fink, Harmonia Mundi
- Robert Schumann: Melancholie - Liederkreis op. 39 und gemischte Lieder, Christian Gerhaher, RCA, March 2008
- Robert Schumann: Dichterliebe und gemischte Lieder, Christian Gerhaher, RCA, October 2004
- Terezín|Theresienstadt, Lieder by Victor Ullmann and others, Anne Sofie von Otter, Christian Gerhaher, Deutsche Grammophon, 2007
- Liedertafel, Schubert, Mendelssohn, Schumann, Silcher, "Liedertafel", ORFEO
