= Vox Luminis =

Belgian vocal ensemble

Vox Luminis are a Belgian early music vocal ensemble led by Lionel Meunier. Their recording of Heinrich Schütz's Musicalische Exequien for Ricercar won a Gramophone Award and International Classical Music Awards (ICMA) in 2012.

== Recordings (choice) ==
- Domenico Scarlatti: Stabat Mater a 10 voci. Te Deum. Salve Regina. Vox Luminis Ensemble Ricercar 2007
- Samuel Scheidt - Cantiones Sacræ Vox Luminis, Lionel Meunier Ricercar 2010
- Heinrich Schütz: Musicalische Exequien Ricercar,
- English Royal Funeral Music. Morley Purcell Tomkins Weelkes Les Trompettes des Plaisirs, Lingua Franca & Vox Luminis, Lionel Meunier 2013
- Reinhard Keiser: Brockes-Passion. Tóth, Van Elsacker, Kooij, Les Muffatti and Vox Luminis, Peter Van Heyghen Ramee 2014
- Lassus: Biographie Musicale Volume V Lassus l’Européen Musique en Wallonie 2015
- J. Bach, J.Chr. Bach & J.M. Bach: Motetten Ricercar 2015
- Johann Fux: Kaiserrequiem Kerll: Missa pro defunctis. Vox Luminis, Lionel Meunier Ricercar 2016
- J.S. Bach: Actus Tragicus – Cantatas BWV 106, 150, 131, 12, Alpha, 2016
- "Ein feste Burg ist unser Gott" Luther and the Music of the Reformation, Bart Jacobs (organ) Vox Luminis, Lionel Meunier Ricercar 2017
- 2018: Henry Purcell, King Arthur (Alpha 430)
- 2019: Bach - Kantaten (Ricercar RIC 401)
- Orphée aux enfers (H.488 & H.471) by Marc-Antoine Charpentier, with A Nocte Temporis, Alpha, 2020.
- 2020: Andreas Hammerschmidt, Ach Jesus stirbt (Ricercar, RIC 418)
- 2021: Heinrich Ignaz Franz Biber, Requiem, with Freiburger Barockkonsort (Alpha 665)
