= Jean-Efflam Bavouzet =

French classical pianist

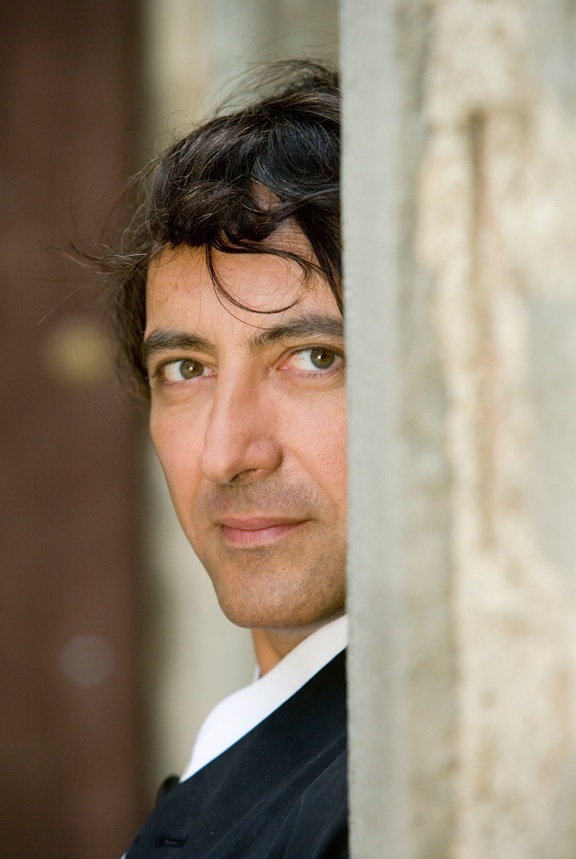

Background information
- Born: 17 October 1962 (age 63); Lannion, France
- Education: Conservatoire de Paris
- Genre: Classical music
- Occupation: Pianist
- Instrument: Piano
- Years active: 1980s–present
- Label: Chandos
- Website: www.bavouzet.com

Jean-Efflam Bavouzet (born 17 October 1962) is a French classical pianist.

== Education ==
Bavouzet was born in Lannion, France and grew up in Metz. He started his music studies there, encountering composers including Iannis Xenakis, Olivier Messiaen, Karlheinz Stockhausen and Pierre Boulez. Moving to the Conservatoire de Paris, he studied under Pierre Sancan, among others. He also had private lessons with Georg Solti, and in June 1997 was engaged to play Béla Bartók's Piano Concerto No. 3 with Solti conducting the Orchestre de Paris in 1998. Solti died in September 1997, so they never appeared together in public.

Bavouzet won first prize in the Beethoven International Piano Competition in Cologne in 1986.

== Recordings ==
Bavouzet is a recording artist for the Chandos label. His recordings have received several Gramophone Awards (2014, Prokofiev piano concertos; 2011, works for piano and orchestra by Debussy and Ravel; 2009, Debussy Complete Solo Piano Music, vol. 4), and numerous other awards, including the BBC Music Magazine Award, the Choc de la Musique and the Diapason d'Or.

His discography includes:

- Joseph Haydn: piano sonatas (11 volumes)
- Ludwig van Beethoven: sonatas (3 volumes)
- Gabriel Pierné: concerto
- Béla Bartók: concertos
- Maurice Ravel: concertos; complete piano works
- Claude Debussy: complete piano works, Fantaisie for piano and orchestra
- Franz Liszt: recital
- Wolfgang Amadeus Mozart: concertos
