= Concerto Italiano =

Italian early music ensemble

Concerto Italiano is an Italian early music ensemble well known for their interpretations of Monteverdi and Vivaldi, among others.

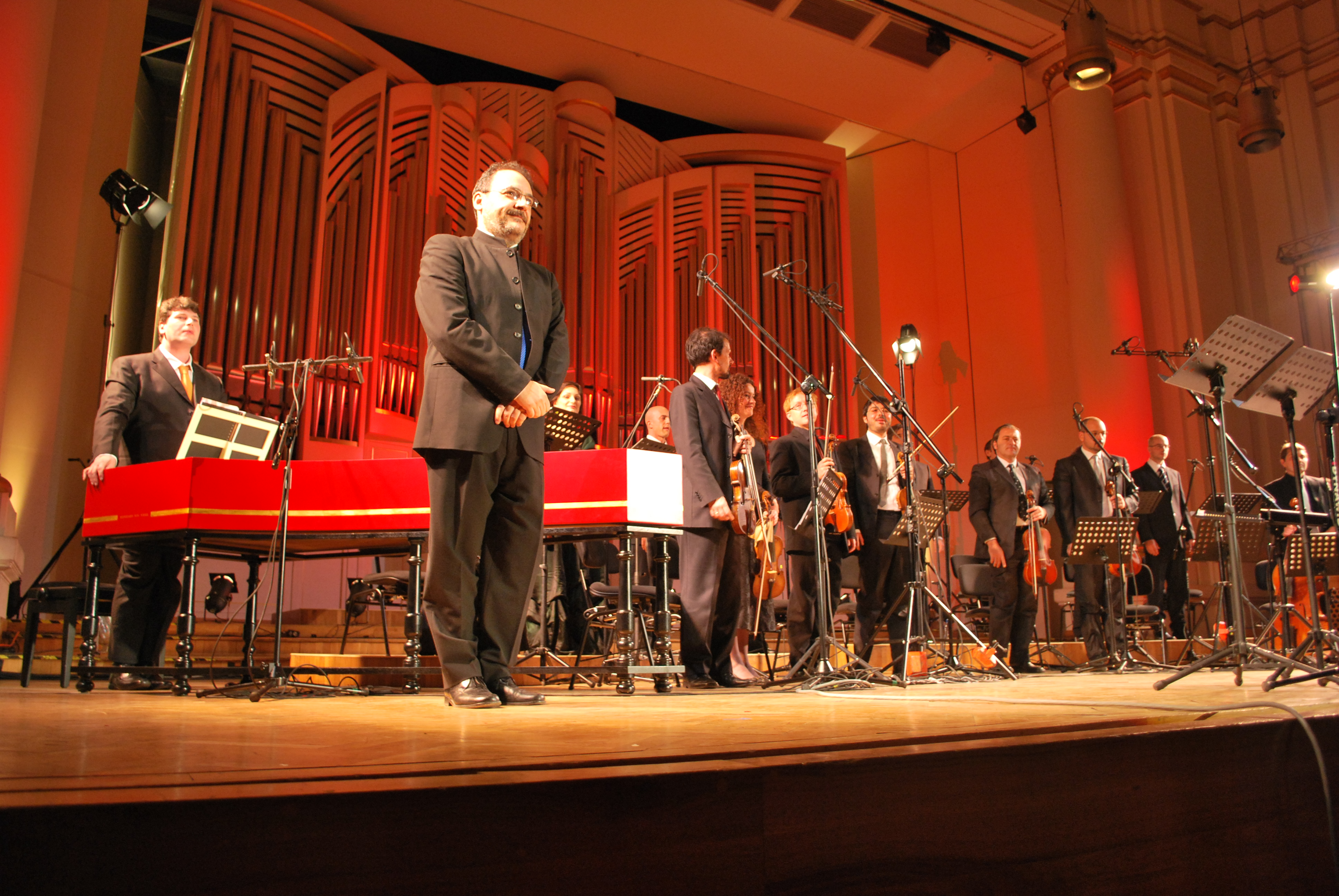
Concerto Italiano - Live concert in 2009

The historically informed performance ensemble was formed by the harpsichordist Rinaldo Alessandrini, and made its Rome debut with Francesco Cavalli's La Calisto in 1984. Since then, Concerto Italiano has recorded Monteverdi madrigals, which have won numerous awards, including the Gramophone Award three times. Other major international awards garnered by this ensemble include Preis der deutschen Schallplattenkritik, Prix de la Nouivelle Académie du disque, Premio internationale del disco Antonio Vivaldi (Cini Foundation), and the Prix de l'Académie Charles Cros.

Concerto Italiano is under exclusive contract with OPUS 111, which is now under the umbrella of the large French label, Naïve. Most recently, with conjunction with the National University Library in Turin, Concerto Italiano has been recording all the operas and concertos of Vivaldi, many of which have not been performed for over 300 years. Highlights include Concerto Italiano's recordings of the opera L'Olimpiade, La Senna Festeggiante, Le Quattro Stagioni (hailed as one of the best versions of the work by Gramophone), Vespri Solenni per la Festa dell'Assunzione di Maria Vergine (a reconstruction of a possible Vespers for the Ascension of the Virgin Mary and 2004 Gramophone winner for Baroque Vocal), and in 2004, an entire CD devoted to Vivaldi's Concerti per Archi.
