= Laudibus in sanctis (Byrd) =

Psalm setting by César Franck

- Sacred motet by William Byrd
- Text: Psalm 150
- Language: Latin
- Published: 1591
- Scoring: SSATB

Laudibus in sanctis is a three-section Latin motet by William Byrd that paraphrases, rather than sets, Psalm 150. Published for five-part choir in his 1591 collection Cantiones sacrae, its sections have these incipits: Laudibus in sanctis — Magnificum Domini — Hunc arguta.

== History ==
One of England's most active composers during the Tudor period, Byrd composed much sacred music, with his earliest attributed compositions dating to the reign of Mary I and her revival of the Use of Sarum, and later, with the accession of Elizabeth I, for the Anglican liturgy. In 1589 and 1591, Byrd published two books of sacred songs (Cantiones Sacrae), which by his account was published "...owing to the carelessness of scribes in making copies...". Laudibus in sanctis is found in the second book, as the opening three parts. Psalm 150 calls for praise of God in music, and even cites nine instruments. Besides Byrd, it has inspired composers such as Anton Bruckner, Igor Stravinsky and Benjamin Britten.

== Music ==
Byrd's psalm setting Laudibus in sanctis is in 16th-century madrigal style, featuring syncopes and onomatopoeic word settings. In a triple metre, it has at times dance character. It is set for five voices, two sopranos, alto, tenor and bass.

== Recordings ==
The beginning became the title of a collection of Byrd's sacred motets, which features the piece as the conclusion. It was recorded by The Cardinall's Musick conducted by Andrew Carwood in 2006. The recording is volume 10 of The Byrd Edition.
