= Raphaël Pichon =

French countertenor and conductor (born 1984)

- Born: 1984 (age 41–42); Paris
- Occupations: Countertenor and choral Conductor
- Spouse: Sabine Devieilhe

Raphaël Pichon (born in 1984 in Paris) is a French countertenor, choral and orchestral conductor.

== Biography ==
Raphaël Pichon was a member of the Maîtrise des petits chanteurs de Versailles (children's choir) during his childhood. He then studied violin and piano at the Versailles Conservatory before joining the Conservatoire de Paris, where he studied singing and conducting. First of all a countertenor, he sang under the direction of Ton Koopman, Jordi Savall, Gustav Leonhardt, Laurence Equilbey, Paul Agnew, Jean Tubéry, Vincent Dumestre, Bruno Boterf, Michel Laplénie and Sébastien d'Hérin. He also collaborated with Benjamin Lazar and Gabriel Garrido.

In 2006, during his studies at the Paris Conservatory, Raphaël Pichon created the choir and orchestral ensemble Pygmalion, dedicated to the repertoire on period instruments. Pichon has also directed the chamber choir OTrente, turned towards the romantic and contemporary repertoire.

== Opera ==
A recording of Dardanus by Jean-Philippe Rameau appeared in 2013. In 2015 appeared a live recording of Rameau's Castor et Pollux. Also in 2015 Pygmalion performed Dardanus at the Bordeaux Opera in a staged production by Michel Fau.

== Discography ==
From an early date in the ensemble's history, Pygmalion's recordings have received a favourable reception from the critics. An album of mass compositions by Johann Sebastian Bach (Missæ Breves, BWV 234 and 235) in 2008, was awarded a golden Diapason, and an Editor's Choice of the British magazine Gramophone. In September 2012, their third album, Missa, a recording of the first version of the Mass in B minor by Bach was rewarded by the magazine Télérama. Pygmalion's recording of Bach's Motets won the Opus Klassik award for a choral work in 2021. In 2023, their version of Monteverdi's Vespro della Beata Vergine was well received while their recording of Bach's B minor Mass won Gramophone's Record of the Year in 2025.
