= Brigitte Fournier =

Swiss operatic soprano (born 1961)

Brigitte Fournier (born 14 June 1961) is a Swiss soprano singer known for her skills in lyric opera. Her voice, described as a lyric soprano, is best suited to composers such as Mozart and Richard Strauss.

== Life and career ==
Fournier was born in Sion. She studied at the conservatory of Bern in the class of Jakob Stämpfli, where she obtained a teaching diploma in singing in 1983. She continued her education at the Folkwang Universität of Essen in Germany. She then studied at the Lausanne Conservatory with Juliette Bise, where she obtained her first prize in virtuosity in 1987. She completed her training at the Biel Opera School and obtained her first role in 1987 as Naiade in Ariadne auf Naxos by Richard Strauss at the Théâtre municipal and at the Lausanne Opera.

From 1988 to 1990, she was hired by the Opéra de Lyon She played Rosina in The Barber of Seville by Rossini and Norina in Don Pasquale by Gaetano Donizetti. Her interpretation of Sister Constance in Dialogues des Carmélites by Francis Poulenc was recorded in 1989–1990. Back in Switzerland in 1999, she played the roles of Blondchen in Die Entführung aus dem Serail by Mozart and Sophie in Werther by Jules Massenet at the Grand Théâtre de Genève. In 2000–2001, at the Lausanne Opéra, she performed Speranza and Ninfa in L'Orfeo by Claudio Monteverdi conducted by Dominique Meyer. and sings in The Rape of Lucrece by Benjamin Britten and Lucio Silla by Wolfgang Amadeus Mozart in various recitals with another Valaisan, Brigitte Balleys. She then became a singing teacher at the Sion conservatory.

== Discography ==
- The Love for Three Oranges by Sergei Prokofiev.
