= Rinaldo Alessandrini =

Italian conductor

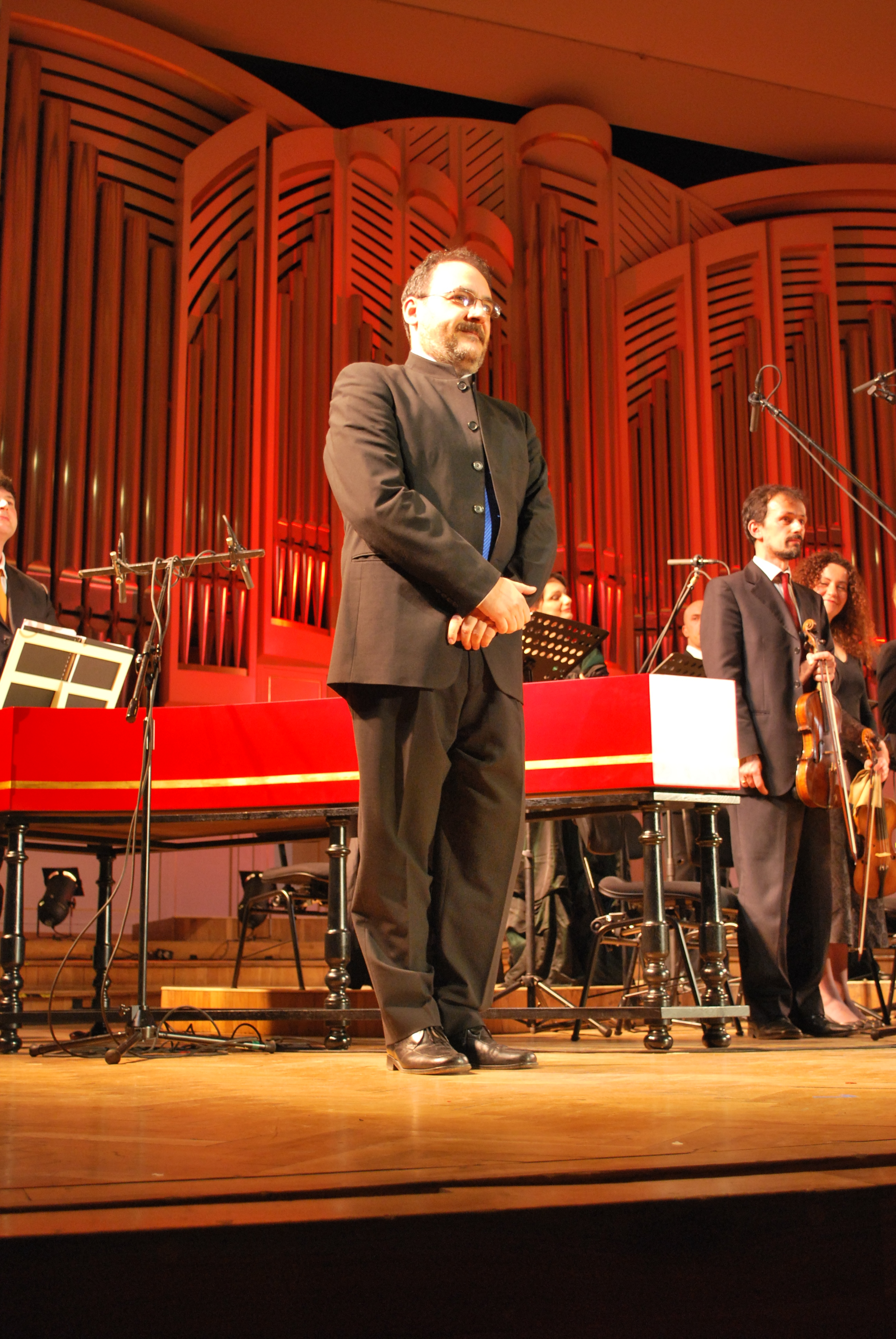
Rinaldo Alessandrini

Rinaldo Alessandrini (born 25 January 1960) is a virtuoso on Baroque keyboards, including harpsichord, fortepiano, and organ. He is founder and conductor of the Italian early music ensemble Concerto Italiano, performing music of Monteverdi, Vivaldi, Couperin, Bach, and others. He is considered a foremost interpreter of early Italian opera.

Alessandrini did not start piano until around the age of 14. In parallel he participated in a choral ensemble. At age 18 he discovered the harpsichord, took lessons with Ton Koopman, and subsequently gave his first concert.

In 2009 Alessandrini conducted his Concerto Italiano at the annual Misteria Paschalia Festival in Kraków, Poland.

== Discography ==
Alessandrini has recorded for Tactus, Italy, for the Opus 111 label of Yolanta Skura, now part of Naïve Records, and the Arcana label of Michel Bernstein.
