= Mompou =

Mompou is a surname. Notable people with the surname include:

- Federico Mompou (1893–1987), Spanish composer and pianist
- Josep Mompou (1888–1968), Spanish painter
