= Jacqueline Robin =

French musician (1917–2007)

Jacqueline Robin (French pronunciation: [ʒaklin ʁɔbɛ̃]; 11 December 1917 in Saint-Astier – 3 February 2007 in Taverny) was a French pianist. Born Jacqueline Pangnier, she also performed as Jacqueline Bonneau.

She entered the Paris Conservatory at the age of ten, and obtained five first prizes there. In 1945, she formed a celebrated piano duo with Geneviève Joy, who married French composer Henri Dutilleux (1916–2013) the following year.

Robin collaborated with the singers Elisabeth Schwarzkopf and Gérard Souzay as a lieder accompanist. She was best known as a performer of French modernist music and of the works of Gabriel Fauré. She taught at the Conservatoire de Paris from 1968–88 and was decorated the Légion d'honneur in 1981.

Jacqueline Robin married the composer Paul Bonneau on 22 January 1940 in Evreux. They divorced in 1959.
