= Pygmalion (ensemble) =

French musical ensemble

Pygmalion is a musical ensemble created in 2006 by Raphaël Pichon during his studies at the Paris Conservatoire. It consists of a choir and an instrumental ensemble. It specialises in baroque repertoire (played on period instruments). The group performed at the 2026 Adelaide Festival for three concerts, their first performances in Australia.

== Partial discography ==
Originally Pygmalion recorded for Alpha, a French early music label record label. Since 2014 the ensemble has recorded for Harmonia Mundi.

As well as recording French repertory, Pygmalion has released notable versions of music by Johann Sebastian Bach:

- Masses vol. 1 (Missae Breves, BWV 234 and 235). Alpha 2008. Diapason d'Or (French award)
- Masses vol. 2 (Missae Breves, BWV 233 and 236). Alpha 2010.
- Mass in B minor, BWV 232. Alpha 2012.
- Missae Breves, complete recording (3 CDs). Alpha 2013.
- Köthener Trauermusik, BWV 244a (a "lost" Bach cantata). Harmonia Mundi 2014.
- Six Bach motets, BWV 225–230. Harmonia Mundi 2020. Opus Klassik (German award)
- St Matthew Passion, 3 CDs. Harmonia Mundi 2022.
