= Giovanni Antonio Pandolfi (musician) =

Italian composer and violinist

[Domenico] Giovanni Antonio Pandolfi [Mealli] (1624 – c. 1687) was an Italian composer and violinist.

== Life and works ==
Pandolfi was born in Montepulciano in 1624, where he was baptised on 27 November, the second son of Giovanni Battista Pandolfi and the fourth son of his father's second wife, Verginia Bartalini, the widow of Mario Mealli. His name at baptism was Domenico; it would appear that he adopted the names Giovanni Antonio on entering religious orders at some stage of his life. His father was the servant of a lawyer. Pandolfi's stepbrother Lorenzo, at the age of around 8, had become a castrato singer at the court of Kraków. Another stepbrother, Giovan Battista Mealli, became a singer in Venice, where Domenico and the rest of the family joined him around 1630 following the death of old Pandolfi.

The annals of the court of Ferdinand Charles, Archduke of Austria in Innsbruck record that Giovanni Antonio Pandolfi Mealli was employed at the court in 1660. He is believed to have trained as a musician in Perugia. He moved to Innsbruck in 1652, and his sonatas Opp. 2 and 3 are dedicated to other court musicians there, many of whom were Italian. He left Innsbruck in 1662, and then took a position in Messina.

Of Pandolfi's works, his two collections of sonatas for violin and harpsichord (Op. 3 and Op. 4) published 1660 and his trio sonatas (Sonate Cioè Balletti) published 1669 have survived; they are at the Civic Museum of Bologna. No trace is known of Pandolfi's Opp. 1 and 2. The violinist Andrew Manze believes the 1669 sonatas may be the work of another composer of a similar name, although the music historian David McCormick argues for their common authorship. He points out that Pandolfi is named on the title page of the 1669 sonatas (although without the additional surname Mealli) as a musician of Messina, and that the 1669 sonatas are named after court musicians of that city; one of them to the castrato Giovanni Marquett, whom Pandolfi was to murder a few years later.

Pandolfi killed Marquett in Messina on 21 December 1675 following a political argument in the Duomo. Pandolfi is described in a contemporary chronicle as a "priest of Montepulciano", and Marquett as "an impertinent layman and eunuch". It reports that Pandolfi had seized Marquett's sword and killed him with it. After this Pandolfi fled first either to France or Catania, and then to Spain, where he was employed from 1678 in the Royal Chapel. He visited Rome in 1679. In 1682 he is reported as living in the household of the Papal nuncio in Madrid, Savo Mellini. There are no references to him after the year 1687, which may be the year of his death.

== Musical style and legacy ==
Manze expresses the opinion that the influence of Pandolfi's works can be detected in the sonatas of Arcangelo Corelli and others.

Pandolfi's sonatas are separated in movements distinguished by cadences and fermatas. However, his sonatas are notable for their number of movements. One of his sonatas having only two movements, while others typically having three. Yet, some sonatas have 7 movements, the longest has 325 measures one of the longest sonatas written in the 17th century.

== List of surviving works ==
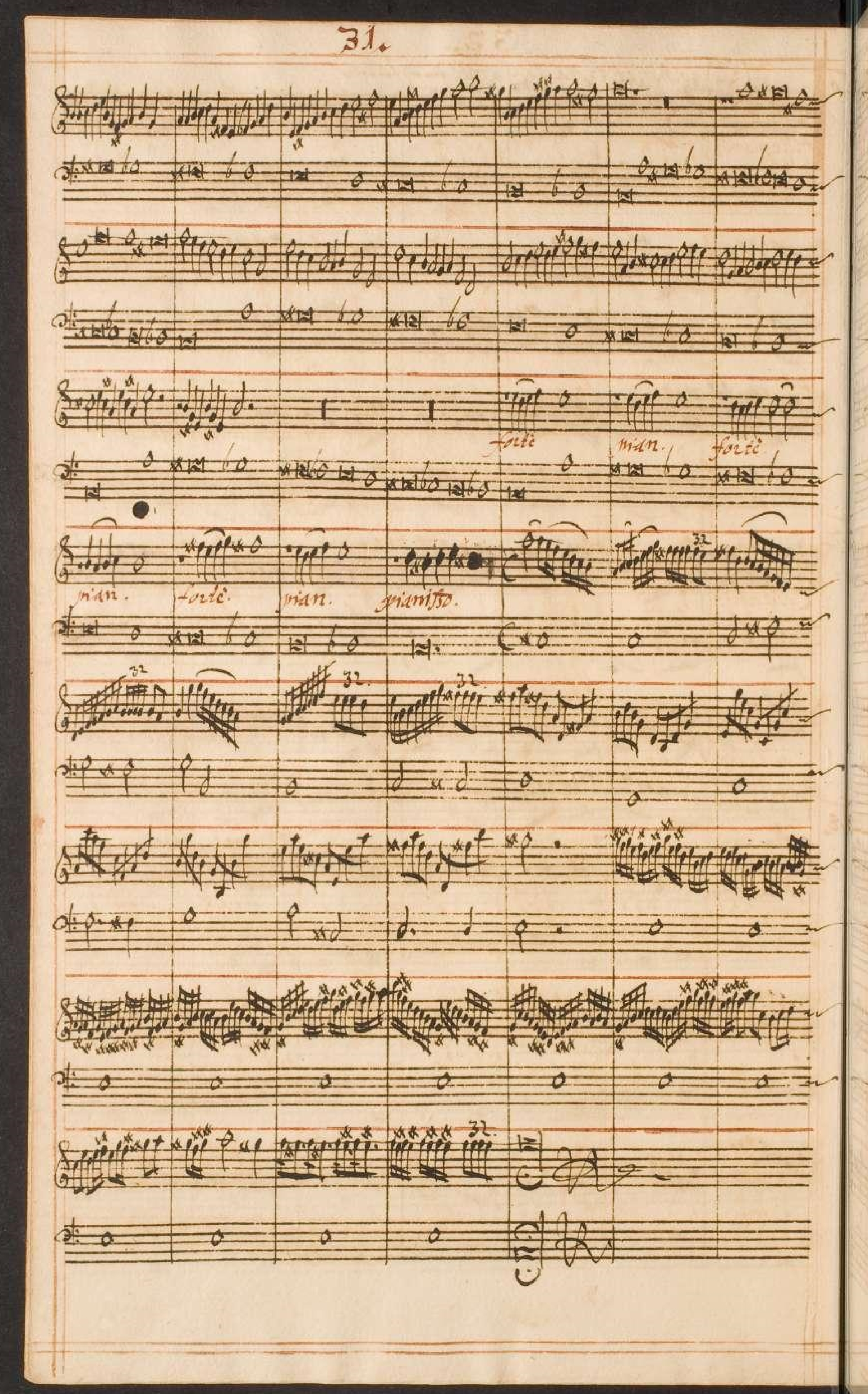
Excerpt of the Sonata "La Cesta" Op. 3 no. 2

=== 6 Sonatas for Violin & Continuo, Opus 3 (1660) ===
- No.1: La Stella
- No.2: La Cesta
- No.3: La Melana
- No.4: La Castella
- No.5: La Clemente
- No.6: La Sabbatina

=== 6 Sonatas for Violin & Continuo, Opus 4 (1660) ===
- No.1: La Bernabea
- No.2: La Viuviana
- No.3: La Monella Romanesca
- No.4: La Biancuccia
- No.5: La Stella
- No.6: La Vinciolina

=== Sonate, cioè Balletti (1669) ===
- No.1: Capriccetto Il Tozzi (2 violins & continuo)
- No.2: Capriccetto Il Candeloro (2 violins & continuo)
- No.3: Capriccetto Il Drago (2 violins & continuo)
- No.4: Capriccetto Il Falvetti (2 violins & continuo)
- No.5: Capriccetto Il Cara (2 violins & continuo)
- No.6: Capriccetto Il Muscari (2 violins & continuo)
- No.7: La Domenga Sarabanda (2 violins & continuo)
- No.8: Balletto Il Folcognoni (2 violins & continuo)
- No.9: Balletto Il Ferrotti (2 violins & continuo)
- No.10: Balletto Il Giusto (2 violins & continuo)
- No.11: Balletto Lo Giudice (2 violins & continuo)
- No.12: Balletto Il Colangiolo (2 violins & continuo)
- No.13: Trombetta (2 violins & continuo)
- No.14: Passacaglio Il Marquetta (2 violins & continuo)
- No.15: Balletto Il Monforti (violin & continuo)
- No.16: Capriccetto Il Raimondo (violin & continuo)
- No.17: Capriccetto Il Mavritio (violin & continuo)
- No.18: Capriccetto Il Catalano (violin & continuo)

== Sources ==
- Longo, Fabrizio (2014). "Pandolfi, Domenico", in Dizionario Biografico degli Italiani, vol. 80. Rome: Treccani. Accessed 17 July 2020. (In Italian)
- Manze, Andrew (1999). Pandolfi: Complete Violin Sonatas (CD liner). Harmonia Mundi. pp. 4–8. CD 907421.
- McCormick, David (2011). In Search of the Real Pandolfi: A Musical Journey between Innsbruck and Messina (MA Thesis). Case Western Reserve University.
