= Mass for Four Voices =

1592–93 choral Mass by William Byrd

- by William Byrd
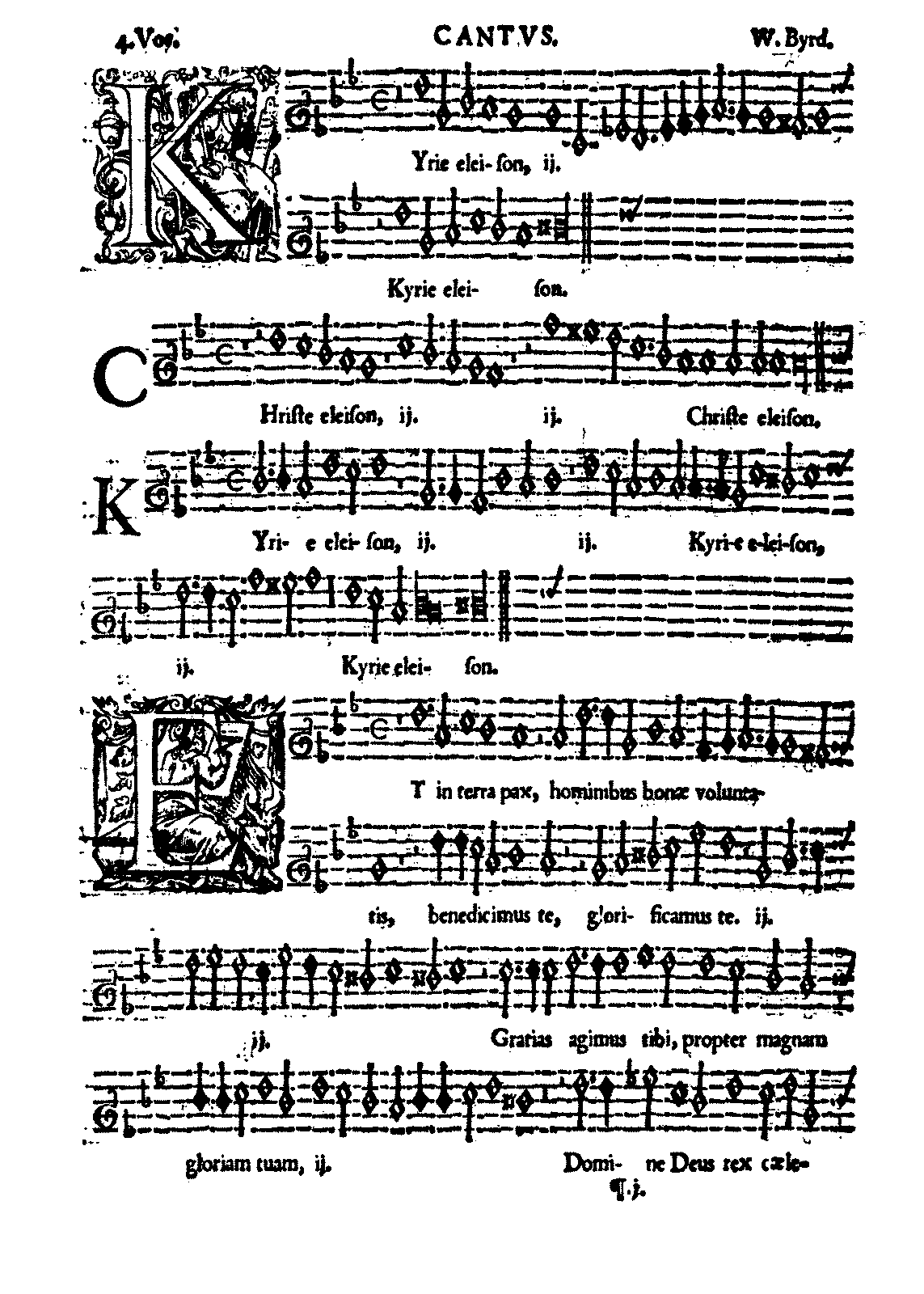
- Front cover of the "Kyrie Eleison" from the Mass for Four Voices
- Period: Tudor
- Genre: Choral music/Anglican church music
- Form: Mass setting
- Text: Ordinary of the Mass
- Language: Greek and Latin
- Composed: 1592–1593
- Movements: 6

The Mass for Four Voices is a choral Mass setting by the English composer William Byrd (c.1540–1623). It was written around 1592–1593 during the reign of Queen Elizabeth I, and is one of three settings of the Mass Ordinary which he published in London in the early 1590s.

It consists of the text of the Mass (Kyrie, Gloria, Credo, Sanctus & Benedictus, Agnus Dei) set for a four-part choir. The work is a noted example of English Renaissance music from the Tudor period.

== Publication date ==
Byrd's mass settings were originally published as small typeset editions. They had no title pages and the printer was not identified. The exact dates of publication of Byrd's mass settings remained unclear until 1966, when music historian Peter Clulow subjected the surviving partbooks to close bibliographic analysis. Tracing patterns of wear in the woodblock initials at the head of each movement led him to conclude that the printing was the work of Thomas East, a noted music printer in Elizabethan England. Clulow's conclusions can be summarised thus:

- Four-part Mass: 1592–3 (second edition 1598–1600)
- Three-part Mass: 1593–4 (second edition 1598–1600)
- Five-part Mass: 1594–1595 (no second edition known)

== Historical background ==
Following the religious conflict of the English Reformation, settings of the Catholic Mass were highly sensitive documents and might well have resulted in the arrest of anyone caught with them. It is probably for this reason that Byrd chose not to publish the Masses as a set but individually in single bifolia which were easy to conceal. To make them more difficult to trace, the partbooks are undated, with no title-pages or prefatory material, and the printer Thomas East is not named. The project was almost certainly suggested (and financed) by Byrd's circle of friends among the nobility and gentry in the Elizabethan Catholic community. Together with the two sets of Gradualia (1605, 1607) the Masses represent a grandiose scheme to provide a comprehensive repertory of music for the Catholic liturgy, to be sung at clandestine Mass celebrations in recusant households. These would have included Thorndon Hall and Ingatestone Hall, the two Essex country houses owned by Byrd's main patron in the later stages of his career, Sir John Petre (later Baron Petre of Writtle) who was a close neighbour of Byrd.

== Style and influences ==
Audio
Byrd's Mass for Four Voices performed by the Ensemble Morales
Kyrie Eleison

Gloria

Credo

Sanctus and Benedictus

Agnus Dei

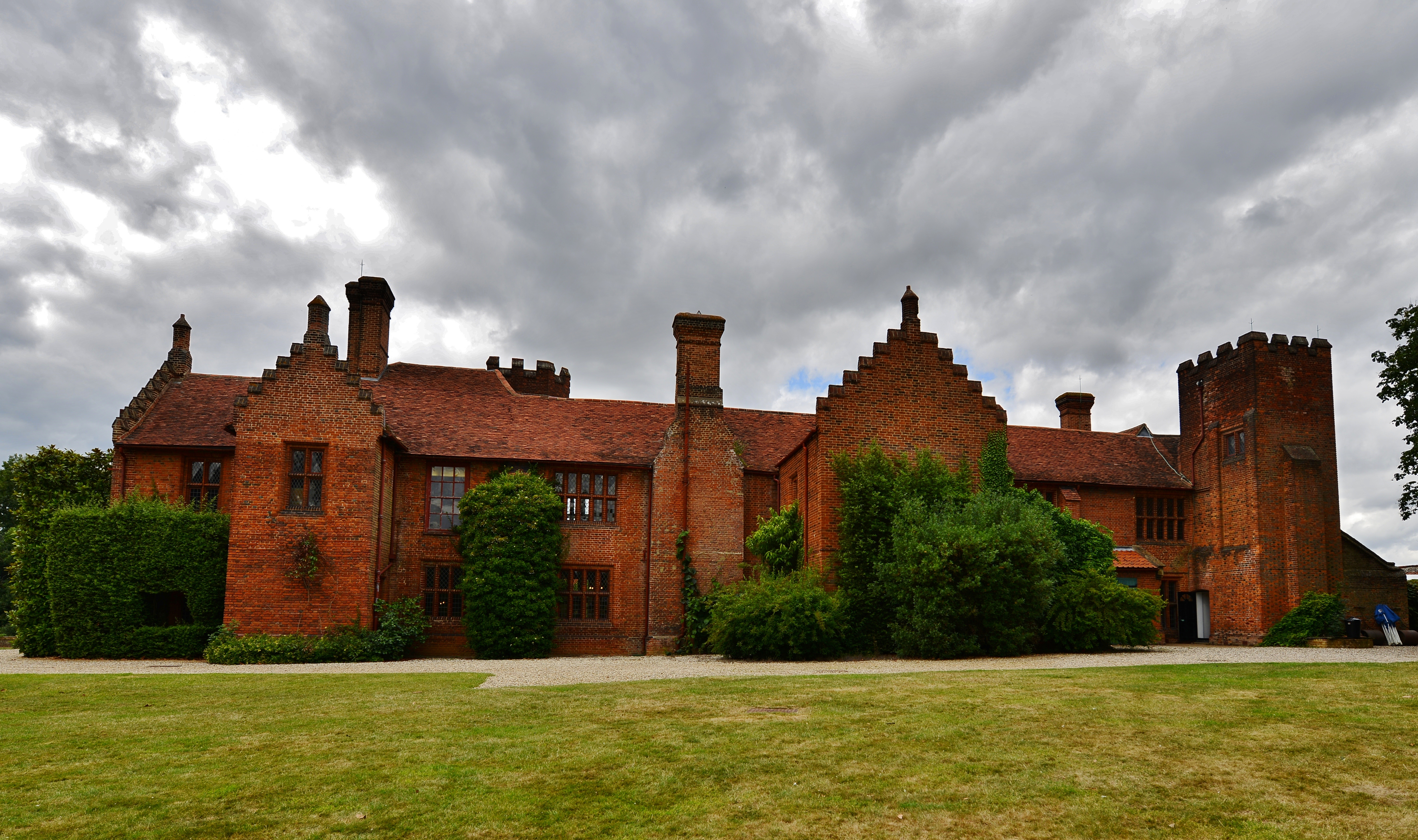
Ingatestone Hall in Essex, where Byrd's mass settings may first have been heard

The native tradition of Mass composition had lapsed after 1558, when the Catholic queen Mary Tudor died and the mediaeval Sarum Rite was officially abolished in favour of the Anglican English liturgy. However, Mass continued to be celebrated illegally by the English Catholic community, often with considerable pomp and under constant threat from spies and paid informers. Byrd's three settings reflect the practice of the Continental Tridentine liturgy by including settings of the Kyrie, which was rarely provided in pre-Reformation English settings because of the various troped Kyries required for major feast-days in the Sarum Use. To that extent they conform to the liturgy as required by Mass celebrations by the incoming missionary priests, who had been trained on the Continent at the English Colleges in Douai and Rome and returned to England to minister to the faithful.

Nevertheless, the settings are much indebted to pre-Reformation English practice in other respects. The longer movements of the four- and five-part masses are constructed from a mosaic of short semichoir sections, with full sections used at climactic points only, a characteristic of most early Tudor Mass and votive antiphon settings. The Four-Part Mass, which according to Joseph Kerman was probably the first to be composed, has a more specific debt to earlier Tudor settings, a debt which has become apparent since Philip Brett observed that it is partly modelled on the Mean Mass by John Taverner (c. 1490–1545), a highly regarded setting which Byrd would probably have sung as a choirboy in the 1550s. According to Brett, Byrd adopted the 'groundplan' of Taverner's setting in laying out the work, but his debt to Taverner is particularly clear in the Sanctus, which opens with a phrase rising stepwise successively through a fifth, a sixth and a seventh, mirroring the parallel passage in Taverner's work. Certain strikingly unusual cadence formulae in Taverner also reappear in Byrd's setting. In drawing material from Taverner's Mean Mass Byrd was following in the footsteps of Christopher Tye, John Sheppard and Thomas Tallis, who had all used it as models for Mass cycles of their own.

The Gloria, Credo and Agnus Dei all begin with a two-part semichoir section, a standard feature of early Tudor Mass cycles. The three clauses of the Agnus Dei are set respectively in two, three and four parts. The Kyrie, as the movement least indebted to English models, has no reduced scoring and employs dense imitation in Continental style. All three masses employ a head-motif, which was a standard device in both Tudor and Continental mass cycles. In the Four-Part Mass it consists of a four-note figure D-G-Bb-A (Kyrie) changing to D-A-C-Bb in the other movements. In the Sanctus the B flat strikingly changes to a B natural, producing an unexpected major chord at a key point in the music.

A special feature of the mass (as also of the Five-Part Mass) is the final clause of the Agnus Dei. Although text-expression is not generally a feature of sixteenth-century Mass cycles, Byrd clearly regarded the ending of the Agnus Dei text 'Agnus Dei, qui tollis peccata mundi, dona nobis pacem' as an opportunity for an expressive treatment of the words. He almost certainly identified 'nobis' as the persecuted Tudor Catholic community, as he had done with many of the motet texts which he had set during the 1580s. The final prayer for peace at the end of the Four-Part Mass is one of the most admired passages in the whole of Byrd's output. It is built on a restless suspension figure, which generates a chain of overlapping entries, building to a climax before resolving onto a luminous final major chord.

== Modern performance ==
Byrd's Masses were forgotten for many years, but enjoyed a revival around the end of the 19th century in the Roman Catholic Church in England. The first modern performance of the Mass for Four Voices is thought to have been sung at the London Oratory at Advent 1890. Richard Terry who was appointed as the first director of music at the newly-founded Westminster Cathedral in 1901, was responsible for reviving Byrd's liturgical music in regular worship.

Today, Byrd's Mass for Four Voices is often sung as part of services of Sung Eucharist at churches and cathedrals that have a choral tradition. Despite its origins as a form of music suppressed by Protestant reformers and confined to the private chapels of covert Catholics, the piece is commonly heard today in Anglican cathedrals and is an important piece in the Anglican choral tradition.

In 2023, the Gloria from the Mass for Four Voices was sung as part of the liturgy for the coronation of Charles III and Camilla.

== Discography ==
Year	Label	Title	Artist
1985	Gimell Records	Byrd: 3 Masses	The Tallis Scholars/Peter Phillips
1990	Capitol Records	Byrd: Mass for Four Voices / Mass for Five Voices	Choir of St John's College, Cambridge/George Guest
1992	Naxos	William Byrd: Mass for Four Voices; Mass for Five Voices; Infelix Ego	Oxford Camerata / Jeremy Summerly
1993	EMI Classics	Byrd: Masses for 3, 4 & 5 Voices; Ave Verum	The Hilliard Ensemble
1994	ECM New Series	Byrd: Motets & Mass for Four Voices	Theatre of Voices/Paul Hillier
1996	CRD	Byrd & Tallis, Mass & Lamentations	New College Choir/Edward Higginbottom
2000	ASV Records	Byrd Edition, Vol. 5 - The Masses	The Cardinall's Musick/Andrew Carwood
2002	Angel Records	Byrd: Masses for 4 & 5 Voices	The Sixteen/Harry Christophers
2005	Signum Records	1605: Treason and Dischord	The King's Singers
2014	Hyperion Records	Byrd: The three masses	Westminster Cathedral Choir
2020	Delphian Records	Singing in Secret: Clandestine Catholic Music by William Byrd	The Marian Consort/Rory McCleery
