= Mark Edgley Smith =

British composer

Mark Edgley Smith, also written Mark Edgley-Smith (20 March 1955 – 26 July 2008) was a British composer. He was born in Wimbledon and educated at Tiffin School, Kingston upon Thames. It was at Tiffin that he began to compose seriously, and he later went to study music at the Queen's College, Oxford.

Mark Edgley Smith had a daughter, Anna February Edgley-Smith (born 25 February 1983), and a son, Milo Henry Edgley-Smith (born 4 May 1999). He died in Cheltenham, aged 53.

== Chronological list of compositions ==
[many juvenilia omitted]

- Go-round for brass quintet, Op.1 (1976, revised 1983)
- Campanile for flute, harp and harpsichord, Op.2 (1976)
- Magnificat and Nunc dimittis [English text] for three equal voices, Op.3 (1975)
- Occasional fanfare for brass, piano and percussion (1976, orch. 1983)
- Quinta essentia for brass sextet, Op.4 (1977)
- Fire festival for mixed chamber choir, Op.5 (1977-8)
- The House of Sleep [John Gower] for mezzo and 9 instruments, Op.6 (1982-3)
- Six starsongs for children’s voices, piano and percussion, Op.7 (1983)
- In nomine for 6 instruments, Op.8 (1983)
- Planh for small orchestra, Op.9 (1984)
- Panic relation for clarinet and piano, Op.10 (1985)
- Vancouver songbook, Volume 1 for children’s voices (1-4 parts) and piano, Op.11 (1992-3)
- Nuper rosarum flores [after Dufay] for orchestra, Op.12 (1992)
- 2 × 2 movements for 2 × 2 saxophones, Op.13 (1993)
- Vancouver songbook, Volume 2 for children’s voices (1-4 parts) and piano, Op.14 (1994 onwards)
- five madrigals to poems by e e cummings for chorus, Op.15 (1994; no. 5 revised 2002)
- «People of liberated city celebrate under a cloud» for piano solo, Op.16 (1994)
- Angelus Domini descendit – anthem for double chorus and organ, Op.16a (1995)
- Fanfares for forgotten occasions for brass quintet, Op.17 (1995)
- Welsh incident [Robert Graves] – song for male voice and piano, Op.18 (1996)
- The actor’s nightmare and Sister Mary Ignatius explains it all for you (1996) - incidental music for a double bill of plays by Christopher Durang
- Songs my Auntie taught me – fantasy-overture for orchestra, Op.19 (1998)
- Song’s eternity [John Clare] for children’s chorus (4-part) and piano (1998) - written for the Vancouver songbook but withdrawn
- Notturno diurno for small orchestra (1999)
- Until the day break [Song of Songs] for men’s and women’s voices (each unison) and organ, Op.20 (1999)
- Ludi Sæcularia – five dances for orchestra, Op.21 (1997–99)
- Jabberwocky [Lewis Carroll] – a melodrama for narrator, children’s chorus and 13 instruments, Op.22 (2001)
- Jabberwocky – version for narrator, children’s chorus and orchestra, Op.22a
- The Owl and the Pussy-Cat [Edward Lear] for SATB and guitar(s), Op.23 (2002)
- String quartet, Op.24 (2003-4), commissioned by Heather Pritchard
- … an owld song of Mr. Birde … for chamber orchestra, Op.25 (2003-6)

=== Reconstruction ===
- Schütz: Opening chorus of the Christmas story reconstructed from the extant continuo part: SATB, 2vn. 2va. bn. bc (other instruments ad lib.) (1976)

=== Arrangements ===
- Byrd: The Earl of Oxfordes march [orig. kbd] for 12 brass and percussion (2003)
- Debussy: Feuilles mortes [orig. pf] for orchestra (1977)
- Ives: Variations on 'America' [orig. org] for orchestra (2006)
- MacDowell: Sea pictures [orig. pf] for orchestra (1983-2006)
- Purcell: Fantazia no. 7 (Z.738) [orig. 4 viols] for 3 guitars (2000)
- Ravel: Gaspard de la nuit [orig. pf] for orchestra (2003-)
- Sweelinck: Mein junges Leben hat ein End [orig. kbd] for 9 brass (1983)
- Trad. Irish: She moved through the fair for voice and 5 instruments (2005-6)

== Discography ==
- Vancouver songbook, Vol. 1: performed by the Vancouver Bach Children’s Chorus/Bruce Pullan on ‘The Chariot Children’, VBCC 9499CD
- five madrigals to poems by e e cummings: performed by Schola Cantorum of Oxford/Jeremy Summerly on ‘Children of our time’, Hyperion CDA67575
