= Requiem (Fauré) =

1880s Requiem Mass by Gabriel Fauré

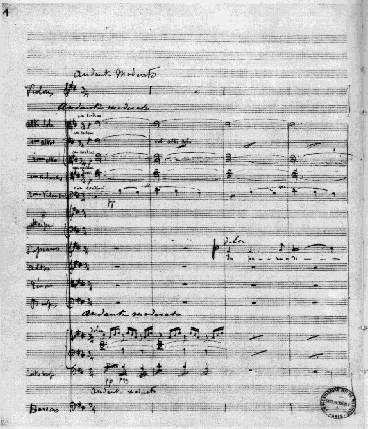
Page from the manuscript of the Requiem: In paradisum, m. 413, Bibliothèque Nationale, Paris

Gabriel Fauré composed his Requiem in D minor, Op. 48, between 1887 and 1890. The choral-orchestral setting of the shortened Catholic Mass for the Dead in Latin is the best-known of his large works. Its focus is on eternal rest and consolation. Fauré's reasons for composing the work are unclear, but do not appear to have had anything to do with the death of his parents in the mid-1880s. He composed the work in the late 1880s and revised it in the 1890s, finishing it in 1900.

In seven movements, the work is scored for soprano and baritone soloists, mixed choir, orchestra and organ. Different from typical Requiem settings, the full sequence Dies irae is omitted, replaced by just one of its sections Pie Jesu. The final movement In Paradisum is based on a text that is not part of the liturgy of the funeral Mass but of the burial.

Fauré wrote of the work, "Everything I managed to entertain by way of religious illusion I put into my Requiem, which moreover is dominated from beginning to end by a very human feeling of faith in eternal rest."

The piece premiered in its first version in 1888 for a funeral at La Madeleine, the church in Paris where the composer served as organist. A performance takes about 35 minutes.

== History ==
Fauré's reasons for composing his Requiem are uncertain. One possible impetus may have been the death of his father in 1885, and his mother's death two years later, on New Year's Eve 1887. However, by the time of his mother's death he had already begun the work, about which he later declared, "My Requiem wasn't written for anything – for pleasure, if I may call it that!" The earliest composed music included in the Requiem is the Libera me, which Fauré wrote in 1877 as an independent work.

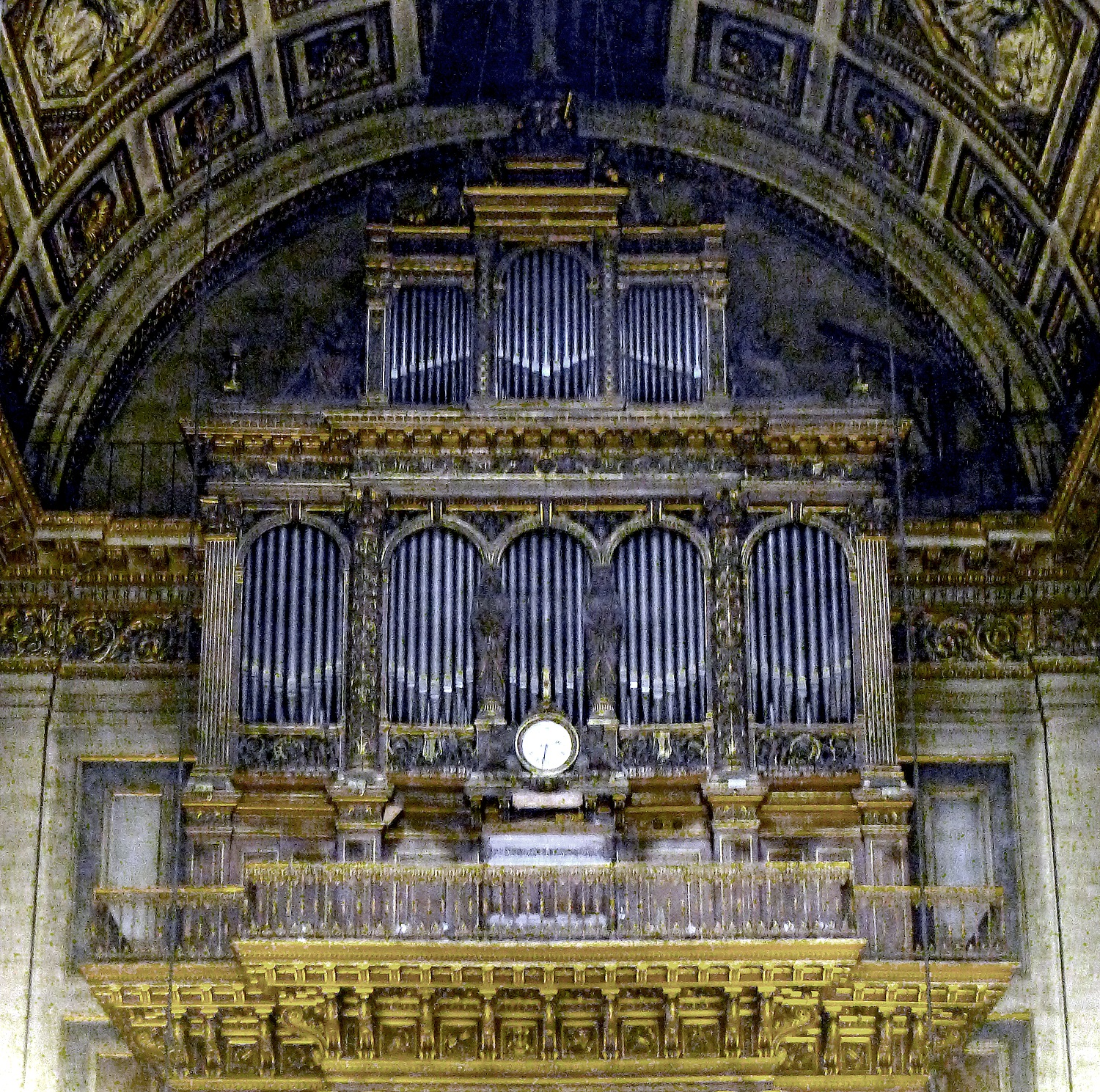
The organ by Aristide Cavaillé-Coll in La Madeleine, Paris, where the first version of the Requiem was first performed

In 1887–88, Fauré composed the first version of the work, which he called "un petit Requiem" with five movements (Introit and Kyrie, Sanctus, Pie Jesu, Agnus Dei and In Paradisum), but did not include his Libera me. This version was first performed on 16 January 1888 for the funeral of Joseph Lesoufaché, an architect, at La Madeleine, Paris. The composer conducted his work; the treble soloist was Louis Aubert.

In 1889, Fauré added the Hostias portion of the Offertory and in 1890 he expanded the Offertory and added the 1877 Libera me. This second version was premiered on 21 January 1893, again at the Madeleine with Fauré conducting. The church authorities allowed no female singers and insisted on boy treble and alto choristers and soloists; Fauré composed the work with those voices in mind, and had to employ them for his performances at the Madeleine, but in the concert hall, unconstrained by ecclesiastical rules, he preferred female singers for the upper choral parts and the solo in the Pie Jesu.

In 1899–1900, the score was reworked for full orchestra. This final version was premiered at the Trocadéro in Paris on 12 July 1900, during the Exposition Universelle. Paul Taffanel conducted forces of 250 performers.

The composer said of the work, "Everything I managed to entertain by way of religious illusion I put into my Requiem, which moreover is dominated from beginning to end by a very human feeling of faith in eternal rest." He told an interviewer,

It has been said that my Requiem does not express the fear of death and someone has called it a lullaby of death. But it is thus that I see death: as a happy deliverance, an aspiration towards happiness above, rather than as a painful experience. The music of Gounod has been criticised for its inclination towards human tenderness. But his nature predisposed him to feel this way: religious emotion took this form inside him. Is it not necessary to accept the artist's nature? As to my Requiem, perhaps I have also instinctively sought to escape from what is thought right and proper, after all the years of accompanying burial services on the organ! I know it all by heart. I wanted to write something different.

In 1924 the Requiem, in its full orchestral version, was performed at Fauré's own funeral. It was not performed in the United States until 1931, at a student concert at the Curtis Institute of Music in Philadelphia. It was first performed in England in 1936.

== Text ==
Most of the text is in Latin, except for the Kyrie, which is Koine Greek. As had become customary, Fauré did not set the Gradual and Tract sections of the Mass. He followed a French Baroque tradition by not setting the Requiem sequence (the Dies irae), only its section Pie Jesu. He slightly altered the texts of the Introit, the Kyrie, Pie Jesu, Agnus Dei, and In Paradisum, but substantially changed the text of the Offertory (described below). He did not set the Benedictus (the conclusion of the Sanctus), and added two texts from the Order of Burial, Libera me and In Paradisum.

Fauré made changes to the text of the Offertory; at the beginning, he adds an "O". He changed "libera animas omnium fidelium defunctorum" ("deliver the souls of all the faithful departed") to simply "libera animas defunctorum" ("deliver the souls of the departed"). He replaced "Libera eas" ("Deliver them") at the beginning of the next verse with a repetition of "O Domine Jesu Christe, Rex gloriae, libera animas defunctorum", and he omitted the third verse (beginning "Sed signifer sanctus ..."). He concludes with an added "Amen".

== Structure and scoring ==
The composition is structured in seven movements:

1. Introit et Kyrie
2. Offertory
3. Sanctus
4. Pie Jesu
5. Agnus Dei
6. Libera me
7. In Paradisum

The piece has a duration of about 35 minutes.

Fauré scored the work for two soloists, chorus and orchestra. Its movements and their sections are listed in a table for the scoring in voices, key, time signature (using the symbol for common time, equivalent to 4/4) and tempo marking. The voices are abbreviated, S for soprano, A for alto, T for tenor, B for bass. The composer divides the choir into as many as six parts, SATTBB, but frequently uses unison of one part or several. Given the liturgical nature of the work, boy trebles are often used instead of sopranos.

=== Details ===
No.	Title	Solo	Choir	Key	Time	Tempo	Notes	Theme
I	Introit et Kyrie							
	Requiem aeternam		SATTBB	D minor	common time	Largo		
	Requiem aeternam		T			Andante moderato		
	Te decet hymnus		S					
	Exaudi		SATTBB					
	Kyrie		SATB				first SAT in unison	
II	Offertoire							
	O Domine		ATB	B minor	common time	Adagio molto		
	Hostias	B			3/4	Andante moderato		
	O Domine		SATB		common time	Adagio molto		
	Amen		SATB	B major				
III	Sanctus		S TB	E♭ major	3/4	Andante moderato	T and B in unison	
IV	Pie Jesu	S		B♭ major	common time	Adagio		
V	Agnus Dei							
	Agnus Dei		T	F major	3/4	Andante		
	Agnus Dei		SATB					
	Agnus Dei		T					
	Lux aeterna		SATTBB					
	Requiem aeternam		SATTBB	D minor	common time	Adagio	first like the Introit	
				D major	3/4	Andante		
VI	Libera me							
	Libera me	B		D minor	cut time	Moderato		
	Tremens		SATB					
	Dies irae		SATB		6/4	Più mosso		
	Luceat eis		A B		cut time	Moderato	unison	
	Libera me		SATB			Moderato	unison, as the soloist first	
	Libera me	B	SATB					
VII	In Paradisum							
	In Paradisum		S	D major	3/4	Andante moderato		
	Jerusalem		SATTBB					
	Chorus angelorum		S					
	Requiem		SATTBB					

The structure of Fauré's work bears striking similarity to that of Ein deutsches Requiem by Brahms, although Fauré set Latin liturgical texts to music, whereas Brahms chose German Bible quotations. Both works have seven movements, both employ a baritone and a soprano soloist, the baritone singing with the choir in movements 2 and 6, the soprano in a central movement (movement 4 in Fauré, movement 5 in Brahms) where she appears with the choir. In both works, the four remaining movements are sung by the choir alone, whereas Verdi, for example, has the soloists sing several arias and ensembles in his Requiem.

=== Introït et Kyrie ===
Introït and Kyrie

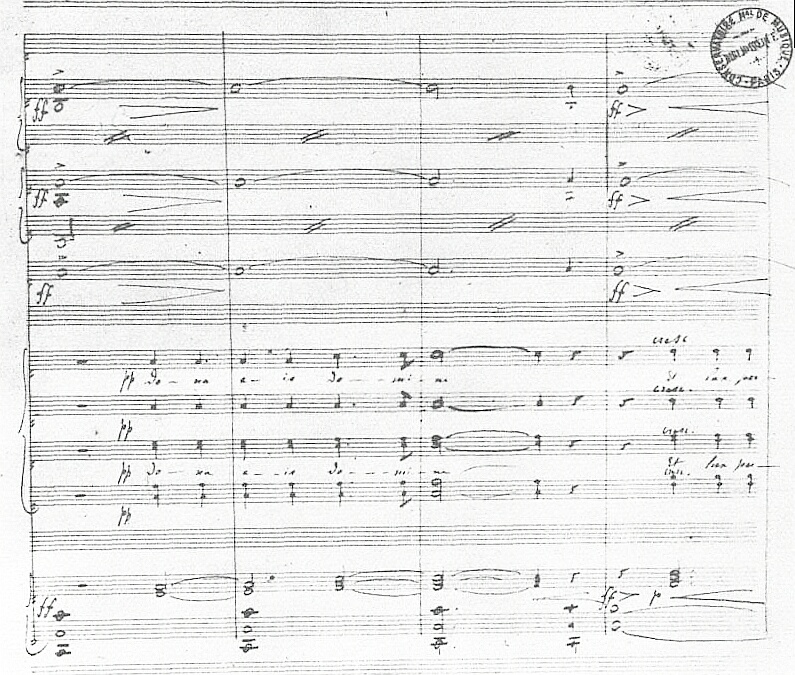
Copy of the manuscript showing bars 4–7 of the Introit and Kyrie

Like Mozart's Requiem, the work begins slowly in D minor. After one measure of just D in the instruments, the choir enters pianissimo in six parts on the D minor chord and stays on it in homophony for the entire text "Requiem aeternam" (eternal rest). In gradual progression of harmony and a sudden crescendo, a first climax is reached on "et lux perpetua" (and lasting light), diminishing on a repeated "luceat eis" (may shine for them). The tenors repeat the prayer alone for eternal rest on a simple melody. The sopranos continue similarly that praise is due in Jerusalem, then all voices exclaim "Exaudi" (hear).

The Kyrie begins with the same melody that the tenor sang before, but now in unison of soprano, alto and tenor, repeated in the following four measures in four-part harmony. The call "Christe" is strong and urgent the first time, repeated more softly a few more times. The final call "Kyrie" appears pianissimo.

=== Offertoire ===
Offertoire

The Offertoire begins in B minor with a canon of alto and tenor in short succession on a simple modal melody with little ambitus, in a prayer "O Domine, Jesu Christe, rex gloriae" (O Lord, Jesus Christ, King of Glory) to free the souls of the departed from eternal punishment and the deep lake, ending in unison. The sequence is repeated beginning one step higher for the next line, and again one step higher for the following more urgent call to Jesus, enforced by the basses. The voices add only softly, broken by rests, what the prayer is about: "ne cadant – in obscurum" (that they may not fall into the darkness).

The baritone enters with "Hostias et preces", offerings brought with praises, beginning on one repeated note, but asking with more melody "fac eas, Domine, de morte transire ad vitam" (make them, Lord, transcend from death to life). The choir repeats the first line of the text on the same motif as in the beginning, but in more elaborate polyphony in four parts, concluded by an uplifting Amen in B major.

=== Sanctus ===
Sanctus

Sanctus (Holy), in contrast with other compositions of Mass and Requiem where it is often illustrated with great vocal and instrumental forces (particularly Verdi's Requiem), is here expressed in extremely simple form. The sopranos sing softly in a very simple rising and falling melody of only three notes, which the male voices repeat, accompanied by arpeggios on the harp and a dreamy rising melody in the violins (sometimes just a solo violin). The pattern appears several times, with the melodies increasing in ambitus, and the volume reaching forte on "excelsis" (the highest). The orchestra changes tone, the dreamy accompaniment is replaced by firm and powerful major chords with a horn fanfare marked forte, and the male voices declare "Hosanna in excelsis" (praise in the highest). This is answered by the sopranos in diminuendo, and the music softens and reverts to the dreamy harp arpeggios that it began with as the violin melody floats upwards to the final note in E♭ major and the full choir repeats, helped by the organ, with the altos finally joining: "Sanctus".

=== Pie Jesu ===
Pie Jesu

The solo soprano (or treble) sings the prayer to the "good Jesus" for everlasting rest. The one line of text is repeated three times, the first two times asking for "requiem" (rest), then intensified for "sempiternam requiem" (everlasting rest). The first call is a modal melody in B♭ major of six measures, the second call is similar but reaching up higher. The words "Dona eis, Domine, dona eis requiem" begin with more expansion, but reach alternating between only two notes on two repetitions of "sempiternam requiem". The last call begins as the first and leads again to alternating between two notes in even lower range, until the last "requiem" has a gentle upward motion.

=== Agnus Dei ===
Agnus Dei

"Agnus Dei", in many settings of Mass and Requiem set with dark expression, begins in F major with a fluent expansive melody in the orchestra. After six measures, the tenors sing a melody to it that gently rises and falls, and repeats it almost the same way. Then, while the motion in the orchestra stays the same, the key changes to the minor mode, and the Lamb of God is asked for rest in chords of daring harmonic progression. Then the tenors, without instrumental introduction, repeat the first line, leading to a peaceful "sempiternam".

The sopranos alone begins the following section "Lux aeterna luceat eis" (Light eternal shine for them) with a long "Lux", then the choir, divided in six parts, lets that light shimmer.

The choir closes with a reprise of the Introit, the opening of the Mass ("Requiem aeternam"), before the orchestra picks up the "Agnus Dei" melody to close the movement.

=== Libera me ===
Libera me

The baritone soloist sings the first section alone. On a bass in an ostinato rhythm of two quarter notes, a rest and the upbeat to the next two quarters, he sings the text "Libera me ..." (Free me, Lord, from eternal death on that terrible day when the heavens will move and the earth, when you come to judge the world with fire.), embarking on a melody of wide range, with some sharp leaps. The text is continued by the choir in four parts in homophony: "Tremens factus sum ego" (I am trembling). In more motion, "Dies irae" (day of wrath) is expressed by fortissimo chords, giving way to the prayer for rest in the same motion, but piano, with a crescendo on "dona eis, Domine", but suddenly softening on a last "et lux perpetua luceat eis". Then the choir repeats the opening statement of the baritone fully in unison. Soloist, then choir, end the movement softly, repeating "Libera me, Domine".

=== In Paradisum ===
In paradisum

The text of the last movement is taken from the Order of Burial. "In paradisum deducant angeli" (May angels lead you to paradise) rests on a continuous shimmering motion in fast broken triads in the orchestra. The sopranos sing a rising expressive melody, enriched by chords of the other voices, divided in six parts, on the final "Jerusalem". A second thought is again sung by the sopranos, filled on the last words by the others: Requiem aeternam.

== Versions ==
Fauré revised and enlarged the Requiem in the years between its first performance in 1888 and the publication of the final version in 1901. The latter is scored for full orchestra; since the 1970s attempts have been made by several Fauré scholars to reconstruct the composer's earlier versions, scored for smaller orchestral forces.

=== First version ===
Five of the seven sections of the Requiem were completed by January 1888 and performed that month at the Madeleine for the funeral of the architect Joseph Lesoufaché. (Note: After the service the priest summoned Fauré and told him, "We don't need all these novelties: the Madeleine's repertoire is quite rich enough.") This version lacked the Offertoire and Libera me, which Fauré added at some time in the following decade. The Libera me predates the rest of the Requiem, having been composed eleven years earlier as a baritone solo. The forces required for the original 1888 version were a choir about forty in number consisting of boys and men (the Madeleine did not admit female choristers), solo boy treble, harp, timpani, organ, strings (solo violin, divided violas, divided cellos and basses). For a performance at the Madeleine in May 1888 Fauré added horn and trumpet parts.

=== 1893 version ===
Fauré continued to work intermittently on the Requiem, and by 1893 he judged the score ready to be published (although the proposed publication fell through). Several attempts have been made to reconstruct the score as it was in 1893. The Fauré specialist Jean-Michel Nectoux began working on it in the 1970s, but the first edition to be published was by the English conductor John Rutter in 1989. Nectoux's edition, jointly edited with Roger Delage, was published in 1994. They had the advantage of access to important source material unavailable to Rutter: a set of orchestral parts discovered in 1968 in the Madeleine and a score made in the 1890s by a bass in the Madeleine choir and annotated by Fauré. Music & Letters judged the Rutter edition, "makeshift and lacking in the standards of scholarship one expects from a university press". The Musical Times considered the Nectoux and Delage edition "invaluable".

Fauré's own manuscript survives but, as the critic Andrew Thomson puts it, "the waters were muddied by his overwritings on the original MSS, adding two bassoons and two more horns and trumpets, together with modifications of the cello and bass parts." Reviewing the Nectoux and Delage edition, Thomson wrote of "several pleasant surprises [including] the restoration of the urgent timpani rolls underlining 'Christe eleison', and the ethereal harp chords which so enhance the spiritual atmosphere of 'Lux aeterna'".

For the 1893 version a baritone solo, two bassoons, four horns and two trumpets are added to the original scoring. When possible Fauré employed a mixed choir and a female soprano soloist, partly because the soprano lines, particularly the solo in the Pie Jesu, are difficult to sing and demand excellent breath control, easier for adult women than for boys.

=== Final version ===
At the end of the 1890s Fauré's publisher, Julien Hamelle, suggested that the composer should rescore the Requiem for performance in concert halls. The intimate sound of the earlier versions was effective in liturgical performances, but for the large concert venues, and large choral societies of the time, a larger orchestra was required. The autograph of the resulting 1900 version does not survive, and critics have speculated whether Fauré, who was not greatly interested in orchestration, delegated some or all of the revision to one of his pupils. (Note: Roger-Ducasse had been entrusted with reorchestrating Fauré's opera Prométhée for performance in the opera house, and Charles Koechlin had orchestrated Masques et bergamasques for the theatre.) Many details of the augmented score differ from Fauré's own earlier amendments to the original 1888 manuscript. The new score was published in 1901 at the same time as a vocal score edited by one of Fauré's favourite pupils, Jean Roger-Ducasse, and some critics have speculated that he reorchestrated the full score at Fauré's instigation. Others have questioned whether so skilled an orchestrator as Roger-Ducasse would have "perpetrated such pointlessly inconspicuous doublings", or left uncorrected the many misprints in the 1901 edition. Alan Blyth speculates that the work may have been done by someone in Hamelle's firm. The misprints have been corrected in later editions, notably those by Roger Fiske and Paul Inwood (1978) and Nectoux (2001).

The orchestration of the final version comprises mixed choir, solo soprano, solo baritone, two flutes, two clarinets (only in the Pie Jesu), two bassoons, four horns, two trumpets (only in the Kyrie and Sanctus), three trombones, timpani (only in the Libera me), harp, organ, strings (with only a single section of violins, but divided violas and cellos, as before).

Nectoux has expressed the view that what he terms the "church" (1893) and the "concert" (1900–1901) versions of the Requiem should both be performed, the choice of edition being dictated by the size of the venue. It is not clear whether the composer favoured either version over the other. Blyth comments "All of his comments about the Requiem ring truer as descriptions of the 1888 and 1894 [sic] versions than of the published text of 1901". Fauré, however, complained in 1921 that the orchestra at a performance of the work had been too small, and commented to Eugène Ysaÿe on the "angelic" violins during the Sanctus in the full orchestral version.

== Selected editions ==
- Fauré: Messe de requiem, Op. 48, ed. Jean-Michel Nectoux and Reiner Zimmerman, Edition Peters
- Fauré: Requiem, Op. 48, ed. Roger Fiske and Paul Inwood, Eulenburg/Schott
- Fauré: Requiem (1893 Version), ed. Jean-Michel Nectoux and Roger Delage (full score and miniature score, Hamelle)

== Selected recordings ==
The Requiem was first recorded in 1931, by Fanny Malnory-Marseillac, soprano; Louis Morturier, baritone; the Choeur de la Société Bach and Orchestre Alexandre Cellier, conducted by Gustav Bret. It was first issued on the "Gramophone" label, and reissued in 1934 on HMV. That recording used the full 1900 orchestrations, as did all others except one over the next half century. The exception was a Columbia set recorded in 1938, with Suzanne Dupont, soprano; Maurice Didier, baritone; Les Chanteurs de Lyon and Le Trigentuor instrumental lyonnais, conducted by Ernest Bourmauck.

Since 1984, when John Rutter's edition of the 1893 score was recorded for the Conifer label, there have been numerous sets of both the 1893 and 1900 versions issued on CD. Those singled out for particular mention by critics are listed below. The Requiem is often combined in recordings and concert performances with Fauré's early Cantique de Jean Racine, an award-winning composition originally for choir and organ which the composer wrote aged 19 in his last year of ten years at the school of church music École Niedermeyer de Paris.

=== 1888 version reconstruction ===
- Lisa Beckley; Nicholas Gedge; Schola Cantorum of Oxford; Oxford Camerata Instrumental Ensemble; Jeremy Summerly (1994).

=== 1893 version ===
- Caroline Ashton; Stephen Varcoe; Cambridge Singers; City of London Sinfonia; John Rutter (1984). Recommended by The Penguin Guide to the 1000 Finest Classical Recordings (2011) and The Gramophone Guide (2012).
- Judith Blegen; James Morris; Atlanta Symphony Chorus and Orchestra; Robert Shaw (1987). Recommended by The American Record Guide (2000).
- Sandrine Piau; Stéphane Degout; Maîtrise de Paris; Orchestre National de France; Laurence Equilbey (2008). Recommended by The Gramophone Guide (2012).
- Grace Davidson, William Gaunt, Tenebrae, London Symphony Orchestra Chamber Ensemble, Nigel Short (2011). Recommended by Richard Morrison, Building a Library, BBC Radio 3 (2016).

=== 1900 version ===
- Victoria de los Ángeles; Dietrich Fischer-Dieskau; Chorale Élisabeth Brasseur; Orchestre de la Société des Concerts du Conservatoire; André Cluytens (Saint-Roch, Paris, 1963). Recommended by All Music Guide to Classical Music (2005).
- Robert Chilcott; John Carol Case; Choir of King's College, Cambridge; New Philharmonia Orchestra; Sir David Willcocks (1967). Recommended by The Gramophone Guide (2012).
- Kathleen Battle; Andreas Schmidt; Philharmonia Chorus and Orchestra; Carlo Maria Giulini (1986). Recommended by All Music Guide to Classical Music (2005).

== Notes and references ==
Notes

=== Sources ===
- Blyth, Alan (1991). Choral Music on Record. Cambridge and New York: Cambridge University Press. ISBN 0-521-36309-8.
- Duchen, Jessica (2000). Gabriel Fauré. London: Phaidon. ISBN 0-7148-3932-9.
- Ford, Andrew (2002). Undue Noise: Words About Music. Sydney: Australian Broadcasting Corporation. ISBN 0-7333-1057-5.
- Jolly, James; David Threasher (2011). The Gramophone Classical Music Guide 2012. Teddington: Haymarket. ISBN 978-0-86024-924-5.
- Jones, J. Barrie (1989). Gabriel Fauré – A Life in Letters. London: B. T. Batsford. ISBN 0-7134-5468-7.
- March, Ivan; Edward Greenfield; Robert Layton; Paul Czajkowski; Alan Livesey (2011). The Penguin Guide to the 1000 Finest Classical Recordings. London: Penguin Books. ISBN 978-0-241-95525-3.
- Nectoux, Jean-Michel (1979). Phonographie de Gabriel Fauré. Paris: Bibliothèque nationale de France. ISBN 2-7177-1467-7.
- Nectoux, Jean-Michel (1991). Gabriel Fauré – A Musical Life. Translated by Roger Nichols. Cambridge: Cambridge University Press. ISBN 0-521-23524-3.
- Orledge, Robert (1979). Gabriel Fauré. London: Eulenburg Books. ISBN 0-903873-40-0.
- Park, Chang-Won; Davies, Douglas J. (28 June 2013). Emotion, Identity and Death: Mortality Across Disciplines. Ashgate Publishing. ISBN 978-1-4094-8179-9.
- Rutter, John (1984). Preface to Requiem Op. 48, by Gabriel Fauré. Chapel Hill, North Carolina: Hinshaw Music. ISBN 978-0-8052-0047-8.
- Steinberg, Michael (2005). "Gabriel Fauré: Requiem, Op. 48". Choral Masterworks: A Listener's Guide. Oxford: Oxford University Press. pp. 131–137]. ISBN 978-0-8052-0047-8.
- Woodstra, Chris; Gerald Brennan; Allen Schrott (2005). All Music Guide to Classical Music. San Francisco: Backbeat Books. ISBN 0-87930-865-6.
