= The Long Day Closes =

The Long Day Closes may refer to:

- "The Long Day Closes" (song), an 1868 part song by Henry Fothergill Chorley with music by Arthur Sullivan
- The Long Day Closes (film), a 1992 British film directed and written by Terence Davies
