= Alamire =

Alamire may refer to:

- Pierre Alamire, Flemish music copyist
- Alamire (consort), medieval and Renaissance music group
- Alamire, note name, see Guidonian hand
