= Pro Musica =

Pro Musica may refer to:

- Seattle Pro Musica, a choir based in Seattle, Washington
- New York Pro Musica, an ensemble that specialized in medieval and Renaissance music
- Oxford Pro Musica Singers, a chamber choir based in Oxford, England
- Pro-Música Brasil, a representative body of the record labels in the Brazilian phonographic market

== See also ==
- Pro Musica Antiqua (disambiguation)
