= Magdala (disambiguation) =

Magdala was an ancient city on the shore of the Sea of Galilee believed to be the birthplace of Mary Magdalene.

Magdala may also refer to:

== Places ==
- Al-Majdal, Tiberias, a Palestinian Arab village on the site of ancient Magdala, depopulated in 1948
- Magdala (woreda), a district of Amhara Region, Ethiopia, that includes Amba Mariam
  - Magdala, Ethiopia, modern Amba Mariam, a former capital of Abyssinia and site of the Battle of Magdala
- Magdala, Germany, a town in Thuringia, Germany
- Magdala, South Australia, a locality north of Adelaide

== Other uses ==
- Battle of Magdala, fought in April 1868 between British and Abyssinian forces
- HMS Magdala (1870), a ship named after the Battle of Magdala
- Magdala (ensemble), an early music ensemble founded by musicologist David Skinner
- The Magdala, a public house in Hampstead, London

== See also ==
- Dūr-Katlimmu in Ancient Assyria, then Magdalu/Magdala in Babylonia, modern Tell Sheikh Hamad in Syria
- Magdalu in Egypt
- Port of Magdalla in India
