= Antony le Fleming =

English composer

Antony R le Fleming (born 1941 in Wiltshire, England) is an English composer of classical music. He is a former student of Raymond Leppard, Herbert Howells and Malcolm Arnold. The bulk of his composition is choral.

== Career ==
Le Fleming served as a chorister at Salisbury Cathedral and later studied music at the University of Cambridge. He was appointed Director of Music at Abingdon School from 1968 until 1974. He started composing his most significant works in the 1980s. His works include Four Partitas for string orchestra, Nocturnes for chamber choir and piano quintet, Serenade for strings, Magnificat for soprano, chorus, and chamber orchestra, and Cantate Domino for double choir, organ and orchestra. In 2000, he was commissioned by the Exeter Chamber Choir to set words by Hilaire Belloc and Heinrich Hoffmann for chorus, piano and orchestra. Matilda, drawn from one of the Cautionary Tales for Children by Belloc, was described by the composer as "mixing in the somewhat acidic taste of Hoffmann with the misadventures of 'Matilda' and 'Henry' while allowing the exemplary C A Fortescue to have the final say."

A selection of his choral works was recorded on CD (Meridian CDE 84360) by the Oxford Pro Musica Singers and the Saint Cecilia Players. Reviewing it for the BBC Music Magazine website, Terry Barfoot wrote that le Fleming "composes for choral forces with assurance and considerable subtlety" and noted the evident influence of le Fleming's teacher Herbert Howells in the "assured handling of the vocal balances" and "eloquent string writing," while also expressing reservations, e.g. that his "development technique often relies on predictable imitations and harmonies."

Besides performances in the United Kingdom, le Fleming's music has received some international attention. Nocturnes, Nunc dimittis, and the Magnificat are among le Fleming's works that have been performed in concert by the Canticum Novum chamber chorus and orchestra of Santa Fe, New Mexico, whose director Kenneth Knight writes that le Fleming "has become one of the ensemble's favorite composers."

Anthony le Fleming is currently the Director of Music at St Mary's Church Hadlow, Kent.
