= The Long Day Closes (song) =

1868 song by Sir Arthur Sullivan

The Long Day Closes is a part song with lyrics by Henry Fothergill Chorley and music by Arthur Sullivan, published in 1868. It has become Sullivan's best-known part song, and is one of seven that he published that year. Sullivan wrote most of his twenty part songs prior to the beginning of his long collaboration with W. S. Gilbert. Chorley had also collaborated with Sullivan on other songs, on Sullivan's first (but never-produced) opera, The Sapphire Necklace (completed in 1867), and on a piece for chorus and orchestra, The Masque at Kenilworth (Birmingham Festival, 1864).

With the growth of choral societies during the Victorian era, part songs became popular in Britain. The plaintive harmonies of The Long Day Closes and the text's touching meditation on death have made the song a frequent selection at events of mourning. Musicologist Jeremy Dibble observes that in particular, it was often sung at funerals of members of the D'Oyly Carte Opera Company.

On 16 December 1879, Sullivan attended a concert at the Mendelssohn Glee Club in New York, where the song was on the programme. He remarked in his diary that it had been 'admirably sung and encored'.

Jeremy Dibble believes that one of the work's most attractive qualities is the way Sullivan has skilfully manipulated Chorley's text to create a modified ternary scheme. He says that it has remained popular in both its original version for men's voices, and the later arrangement for mixed choir.

Terence Davies's 1992 film The Long Day Closes uses a recording of the song by Pro Cantione Antiqua singing the song a cappella. Carl Davis included the theme from the song in his instrumental score for the 1999 Mike Leigh film Topsy-Turvy, along with themes from most of the Gilbert and Sullivan operas. Another recording was included in the 1999 album Sullivan: The Masque at Kenilworth – Music for Royal and National Occasions, sung by the Oxford Pro Musica Singers.

== Lyrics ==
No star is o'er the lake,
Its pale watch keeping,
The moon is half awake,
Through grey mist creeping,
The last red leaves fall round
The porch of roses,
The clock hath ceased to sound,
The long day closes.

Sit by the silent hearth
In calm endeavour,
To count the sounds of mirth,
Now dumb for ever.
Heed not how hope believes
And fate disposes:
Shadow is round the eaves,
The long day closes.

The lighted windows dim
Are fading slowly.
The fire that was so trim
Now quivers lowly.

Go to the dreamless bed
Where grief reposes;
Thy book of toil is read,
The long day closes, etc.

== Recordings ==
Performers	Album	Year	Label
Oxford Pro Musica Singers	The Masque at Kenilworth: Music for Royal and National Occasions	1999	Symposium
The King's Singers	Romance Du Soir	2009	Signum Classics
Hilliard Ensemble	The Romantic Englishman	2009	Duo
Pro Cantione Antiqua	Traditional Glees and Madrigals	2010	Alto
Quartonal	Another Way: English Vocal Music	2013	Sony
Polyteknikkojen Kuoro	Laululla	2017	Polyteknikkojen Kuoro
Kantos Chamber Choir	Sullivan Part Songs	2020	MPR
Amarcord	Meisterklasse	2022	Apollon Classics
The Sixteen	Sirens' Song	2023	CORO
Tenebrae	A Prayer for Deliverance	2025	Signum Classics
VOCES8	Choral music from across the centuries	2025	BBC Music Magazine

Sources: WorldCat and Apple Classical
