= Musica Antiqua =

Musica Antiqua (Latin for early music) can refer to:

- Musica Antiqua Köln, early music ensemble founded in 1973
- Musica Antiqua Bruges, early music festival in Bruges, Belgium
- Ensemble Musica Antiqua, founded in 1958 by René Clemencic

== See also ==
- Pro Musica Antiqua (disambiguation)
