= Antiguo Matadero de Sevilla =

Coordinates: 37.37517°N 5.96372°W

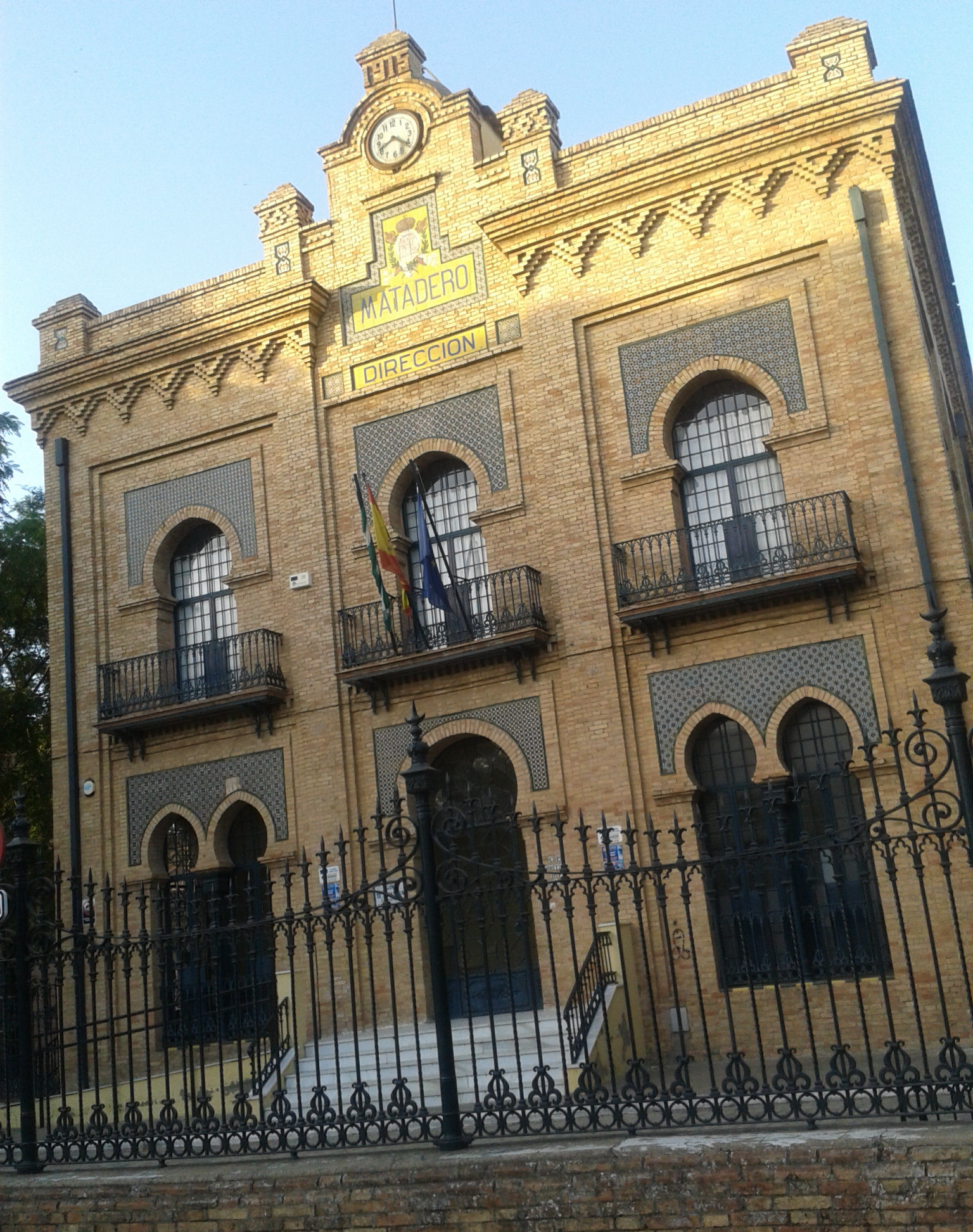
Direction Pavilion of the former slaughterhouse in Seville

The Antiguo Matadero de Sevilla (transl. Former Slaughterhouse of Seville) is a building located in Seville (Andalusia, Spain). It was built in 1916. It is Neo-Mudéjar style and its bricks with azulejos and flat roof tiles, make it a typical building of Sevillian regional architecture. It was created by José Sáez y López.

== History ==
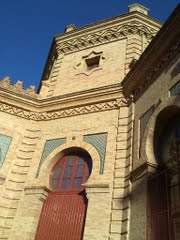
Facilities of the Former slaughterhouse.

The Municipal Slaughterhouse of Seville was formed of two parts, the slaughterhouse and the cattle market. During the floods of Tamarguillo many people received shelter in the building. In 1997 the rains, after years of drought, caused floods in its basements, causing the degradation of the building. At present, there is the Ortiz de Zúñiga School, the Conservatorio Profesional de Música Francisco Guerrero (Francisco Guerrero Professional Music Conservatory), named for Sevillian Renaissance composer Francisco Guerrero which opened in September 1988 and the San Juan de la Cruz Adult Center, for students of all ages.

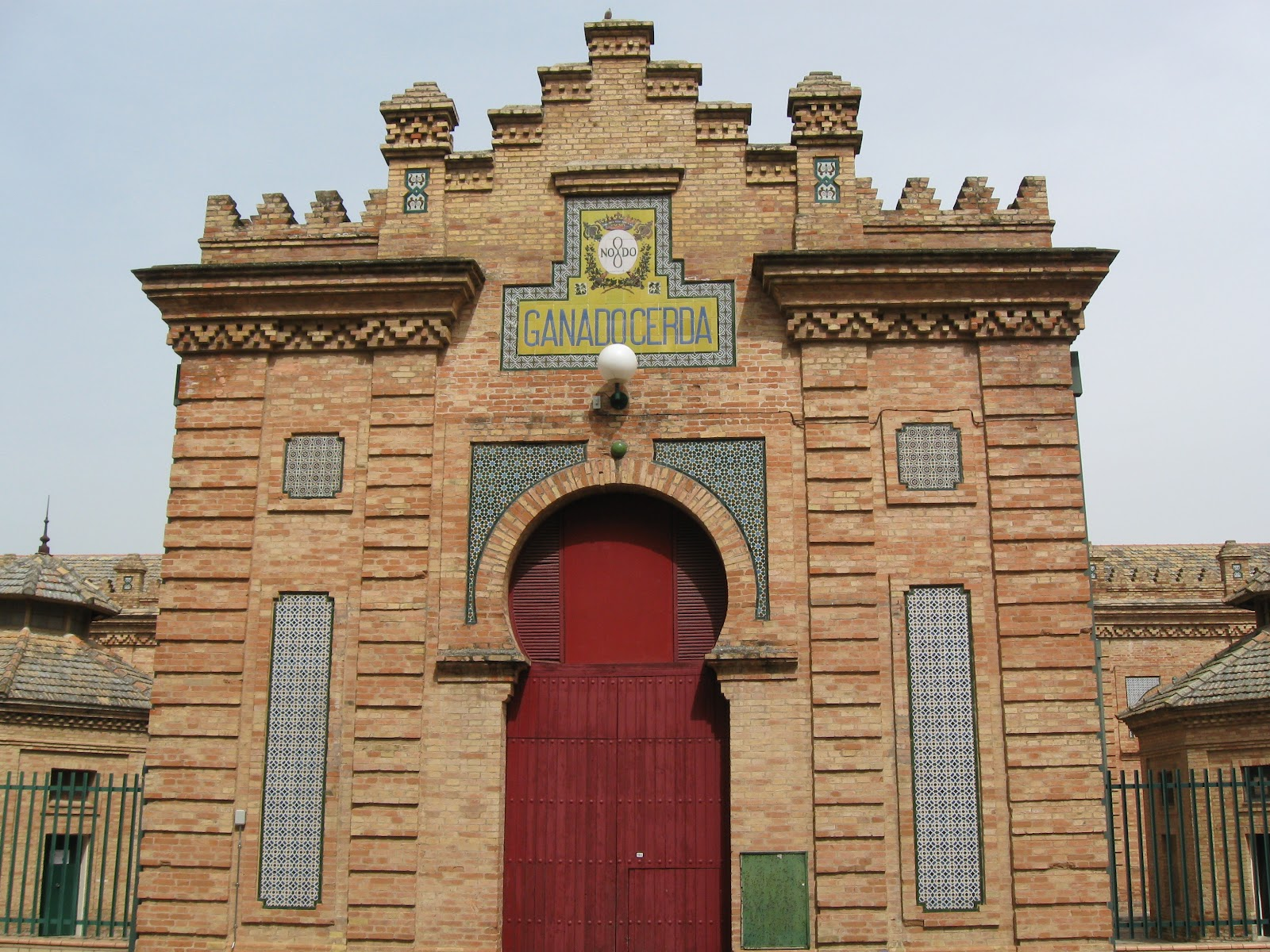
Facilities of the Old Slaughterhouse.
