= Choir of Sidney Sussex College, Cambridge =

British collegiate choir

The Choir of Sidney Sussex College, Cambridge is a Cambridge collegiate choir, under the direction of the musicologist and conductor David Skinner, with Senior Organ Scholar Samuel Kemp FRCO and Junior Organ Scholar Edward Talbot-Ponsonby. The composer Eric Whitacre spent three months in the college in 2010, later being appointed Composer in Residence for five years. The current composer in residence is Nico Muhly.

== Choir ==
The choir usually consists of between six and eight sopranos, between four and six altos, six tenors, three baritones, and three basses.

It sings three services per week during term-time, on Wednesdays, Fridays and Sundays. On Wednesdays, uniquely among the collegiate choirs of Oxford and Cambridge, it sings an entirely Latin Vespers.

In accordance with the Director's research interests, the choir has a particular focus on 16th century English and Continental music.

A new chamber organ was commissioned for the chapel in 2014, built by Taylor and Boody. Construction of another new main organ for the chapel began in the winter of 2016.

== Recordings ==
The choir has recorded several CDs under the Obsidian label.

Its collaboration with Fretwork and Alamire, in a CD of the music of Thomas Tomkins, won the Gramophone Awards 'CD of the Month' and 'Editor's Choice' in February 2008.

A 2012 release of the works of Renaissance composer Thomas Weelkes was nominated for a Gramophone Award as well, with critics praising the choir's "exemplary ensemble and intonation, beauty of tone, clarity of diction, and interpretive expressiveness".

The choir's most recent project is the first recording dedicated to the 16th Century Franco-Flemish composer Jheronimus Vinders and features Andrew Lawrence-King, (renaissance harp and psaltery) on the Inventa Records label.

== Tours ==
The choir usually tours two to three times per year.

Past destinations include California, Spain, Carinthia, Austria and Singapore.

Recently the Choir has toured the East Coast of America in the summer of 2022, where they performed at Washington National Cathedral, Franciscan Monastery of the Holy Land in America and Saint Thomas Church (Manhattan), among others.

== Choir tie ==
The Sidney Sussex College Choir tie was first designed in 2013 by Phil Franklin, the Senior Choral Scholar at the time. It incorporates the gold pheon of the college arms on a dark blue background, identifying members of the Choir at formals and other such occasions.
