= Alamire (consort) =

English vocal consort

- Origin: London, England
- Genres: Early music, Renaissance music,
- Years active: 2005-present
- Labels: Obsidian; Classical Communications
- Website: http://www.alamire.co.uk/

Alamire is an English vocal consort specialising in medieval and Renaissance music, both secular and religious. It was founded by David Skinner in 2005, and very swiftly won praise for the quality and imagination of its recordings. "The performances fairly glow, and so does one's spirit after traversing this glorious programme." (Gramophone Magazine)

Alamire recorded the music accompanying the British Library exhibition marking the 500th anniversary of the accession of Henry VIII to the throne in 1509. In 2011 David Skinner and Alamire commenced a ten-year 30-cd programme to explore English choral music between 1400 and the mid-17th century.

The name 'Alamire' is taken from Pierre Alamire, the adopted name of Flemish composer Peter van den Hove, itself derived from syllables in the Solfège invented by the medieval music theorist Guido of Arezzo.

== Discography ==
- Josquin Desprez: Missa D'ung aultre amer, Motets & Chansons (with Andrew Lawrence-King, harp)
- Thomas Tomkins: These Distracted Times (with Fretwork and the Choir of Sidney Sussex College, Cambridge
- Henry's Music: Music written by and for King Henry VIII (with QuintEssential Sackbut and Cornett Ensemble and Andrew Lawrence-King, harp)
- Philippe Verdelot: Madrigals for a Tudor King (with Lynda Sayce, lute)
- Thomas Tallis: Cantiones Sacrae 1575
- John Taverner: Imperatrix Inferni
- Deo Gracias Anglia!: Medieval English Carols from the Trinity Carol Roll (with Andrew Lawrence-King, Michaël Grébil and Pamela Thorby)
- John Sheppard: Media Vita in Morte Sumus
