= The Gift of Music (record label) =

The Gift of Music is an English record label specializing in nostalgia, classical, folk, and historical-themed compilation recordings. The unusual aspect of the record label is that its marketing strategy is focussed on sales at museums, National Trust houses, and other British and Irish tourist attractions rather than focussed on traditional music retail markets. The label's releases are usually designed around historical themes likely to complement museums and tourist attractions, and issues include both re-issued recordings and new commissions.

The management also owns the more traditional, and more specialist Obsidian Records (founded 2005) which specializes in English and Flemish renaissance choral music from the collegiate choirs of Oxford and Cambridge Universities. The musicologist David Skinner is both conductor of the Alamire ensemble, Magdala ensemble, and the Choir of Sidney Sussex College, Cambridge on the Obsidian label, and also one of the managers of The Gift of Music and Obsidian Records.
