= Oxford Camerata =

Choir from Oxford, England

- Choir
- Founded: 1984
- Genre: Early music
- Chief conductor: Jeremy Summerly
- Website: oxfordcamerata.com

The Oxford Camerata is an English chamber choir based in Oxford, England. The Camerata was founded in 1984 by conductor Jeremy Summerly and singers David Hurley and Henrietta Cowling and gave its first performance on 22 May of that year. The ensemble consists of a core membership of fifteen singers, though personnel size varies according to the demands of the repertoire. While the Camerata is known for performing primarily unaccompanied repertoire, it has also performed accompanied repertoire, employing the services of the Oxford Camerata Instrumental Ensemble (founded 1992) and the Oxford Camerata Baroque Orchestra (founded 2007).

== Recordings ==
The Camerata became known for its interpretations of early music following the release of a number of recordings on Naxos Records in the 1990s and 2000s. In spring 1991, Naxos signed Summerly and the Camerata to a five-album contract to record a number of Renaissance masterworks, with recording sessions commencing in July of that year. Following the success of the initial five albums, Naxos continued to release albums by the Camerata, eventually branching out beyond Renaissance repertoire to include recordings of the original 1888 version of Fauré's Requiem and medieval music by Hildegard von Bingen.

== Discography ==
All recordings conducted by Jeremy Summerly.

- Palestrina: Missa Papae Marcelli, Missa Aeterna Christi Munera, April 1992 (Naxos 8.550573)
- Lamentations (White, Tallis, Palestrina, Lassus, de Brito), May 1992 (Naxos 8.550572)
- Byrd: Mass for Four Voices, Mass for Five Voices, Infelix ego, July 1992 (Naxos 8.550574)
- Victoria: Missa O magnum mysterium, Missa O quam gloriosum / Lobo: Versa est in luctum, February 1993 (Naxos 8.550575)
- Tallis: Mass for Four Voices, Motets, October 1993 (Naxos 8.550576)
- Medieval Carols, October 1993 (Naxos 8.550751)
- Gesualdo: Complete Sacred Music for Five Voices, November 1993 (Naxos 8.550742)
- Allegri: Miserere and Other Choral Masterpieces (compilation with other artists), November 1993 (Naxos 8.550827)*
- Lassus: Masses for Five Voices, Infelix ego, November 1993 (Naxos 8.550842)
- Fauré: Requiem (1888 version), Messe basse, Cantique de Jean Racine / Vierne: Andantino / de Séverac: Tantum ergo (with Lisa Beckley, Nicholas Gedge, Schola Cantorum of Oxford), April 1994 (Naxos 8.550765)
- Renaissance Masterpieces (Ockeghem, Josquin, Morales, Lhéritier, Rogier, Clemens), May 1994 (Naxos 8.550843)
- Tye: Missa Euge bone, Peccavimus, Omnes gentes / Mundy: Kyrie, Magnificat, July 1994 (Naxos 8.550937)
- Purcell: Full Anthems & Organ Music, Music on the Death of Queen Mary (Laurence Cummings, organ), February 1995 (Naxos 8.553129)
- Hildegard von Bingen: Heavenly Revelations, April 1995 (Naxos 8.550998)
- Dufay: Missa L'homme armé, Supremum est mortalibus bonum, April 1995 (Naxos 8.553087)
- Byrd: Mass for Four Voices, Mass for Five Voices / Tallis: Mass for Four Voices, September 1995 (Naxos 8.553239)†
- Victoria / A. Lobo / D. Lobo / Lassus: Masses (with Schola Cantorum of Oxford), September 1995 (Naxos 8.553240)‡
- Palestrina: Missa Papae Marcelli, Missa Aeterna Christi Munera, Stabat mater (Schola Cantorum of Oxford) / Allegri: Miserere, December 1995 (Naxos 8.553238)§
- Gibbons: Choral and Organ Music (Laurence Cummings, organ), January 1996 (Naxos 8.553130)
- Weelkes: Anthems, January 1996 (Naxos 8.553209)
- Schütz: Psalmen Davids, July 1996 (Naxos 8.553044)
- English Madrigals and Songs, August 1996 (Naxos 8.553088)
- Schütz: The Christmas Story, Cantiones sacrae, Psalm 100, September 1996 (Naxos 8.553514)
- Machaut: La Messe de Nostre Dame, Songs from Le Voir Dit, October 1996 (Naxos 8.553833)
- Obrecht: Missa Caput, Salve Regina, January 1998 (Naxos 8.553210)
- Josquin: Missa L'homme armé, Ave Maria, Absalon fili me, March 1998 (Naxos 8.553428)
- Ockeghem: Missa L'homme armé, Ave Maria, Alma Redemptoris Mater / Josquin: Memor esto verbi tui, March 1998 (Naxos 8.554297)
- Willaert: Missa Christus resurgens, Magnificat sexti toni, Ave Maria, November 1998 (Naxos 8.553211)
- Let Voices Resound: Songs from Piae Cantiones (female voices), January 1999 (Naxos 8.553578)
- Tomkins: Choral and Organ Music (Laurence Cummings, organ), September 1999 (Naxos 8.553794)
- Tallis: Spem in alium, Missa Salve intemerata, June 2005 (Naxos 8.557770)
- Gombert: Magnificat I, Salve Regina, Credo, Tulerunt Dominum, January 2006 (Naxos 8.557732)
- Hildegard von Bingen: Celestial Harmonies, May 2008 (Naxos 8.557983)

* First release of Oxford Camerata recording of Miserere; reissue of Palestrina Lesson I for Maundy Thursday from Naxos 8.550572
† Compilation of recordings previously released on Naxos 8.550574 and Naxos 8.550576
‡ Compilation of recordings previously released on Naxos 8.550575, Naxos 8.550682 (Schola Cantorum of Oxford/Summerly) and Naxos 8.550842
§ Reissue of Naxos 8.550573 with addition of Schola Cantorum of Oxford/Summerly recording of Palestrina Stabat mater from Naxos 8.550836 and Oxford Camerata recording of Allegri Miserere from Naxos 8.550827
