= Jheronimus Vinders =

Franco-Flemish composer of the Renaissance

Jheronimus Vinders (also Vender or Venders) (fl. 1525–1526) was a Franco-Flemish composer of the Renaissance, active at Ghent. He was a minor member of the generation after Josquin des Prez, and he also composed a notable lament on the more famous composer's death.

Next to nothing is known about his life, except that he was the singing-master at Onze-Lieve-Vrouwe-op-de-rade, the guild at St. Baaf cathedral (formerly known as the Janskerk), in Ghent, in 1525 and 1526. That city was a prominent center of music-making throughout the Renaissance, and produced many famous composers and singers.

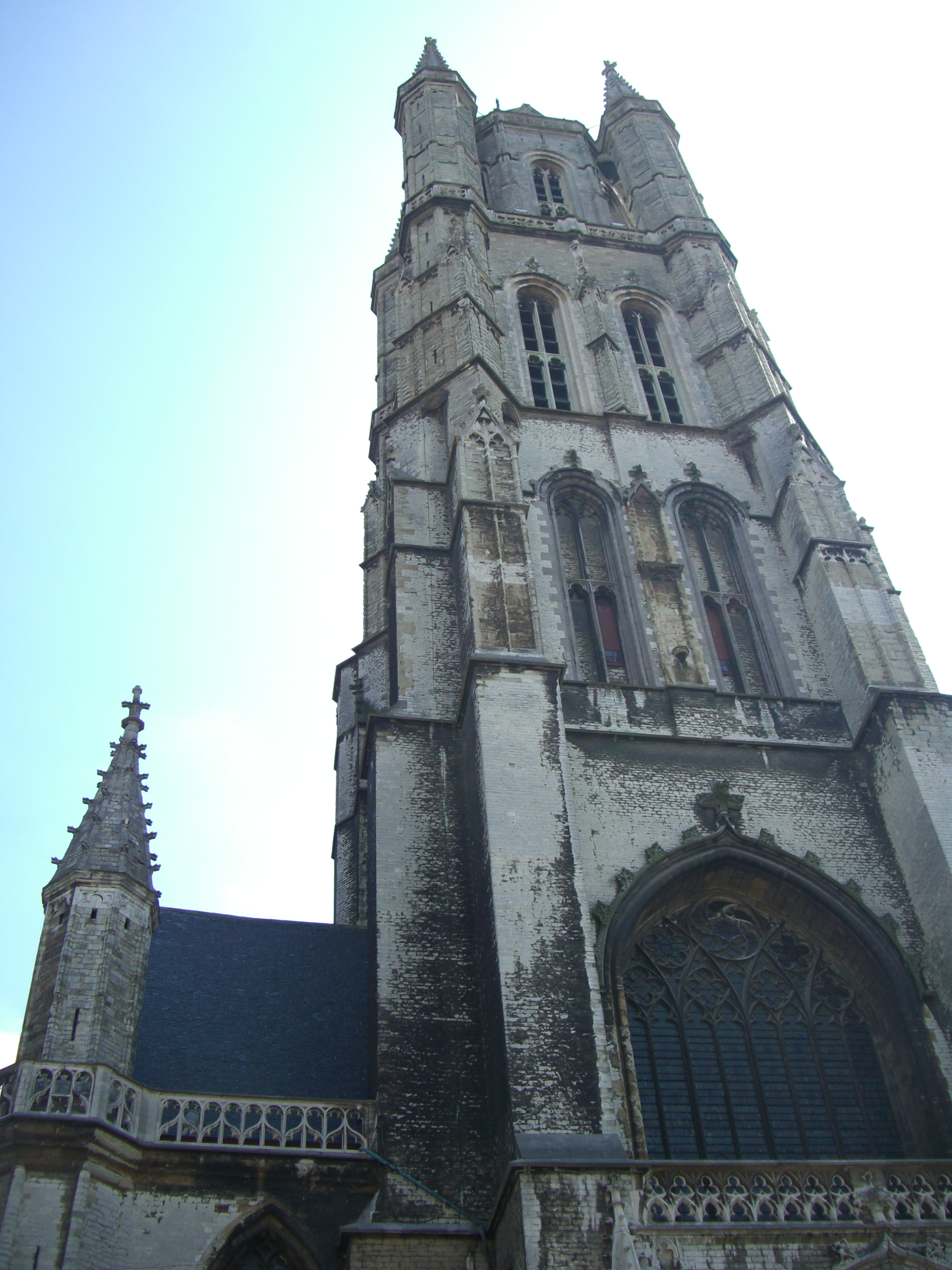
In 1525-6, Vinders was singing master at the St. Baaf Cathedral in Ghent.

Vinders' music has both progressive features, such as the pervasive imitation which was to characterize the compositions of the generation of Gombert and Clemens non Papa, and unusually conservative elements, such as use of the cantus-firmus technique, which had been old-fashioned since around 1500 or even before. Sometimes he combined both the conservative and progressive elements together in the same work, such as in his mass based on the famous tune Fors seulement, which uses both cantus-firmus and parody together (parody technique was to be the favorite method of mass composition right up to the end of the century; it used many voices of a multi-voice model).

Vinders wrote both sacred and secular music. All is polyphonic music for voices; no instrumental compositions have survived, or been attributed to him. Four masses survive, all for five voices; all use different kinds of sources. The Missa Fors seulement is built on the chansons by Antoine de Févin and Matthaeus Pipelare; the Missa Fit porta Christi pervia is based on a plainchant cantus firmus; the Missa Myns liefkens bruyn ooghen uses as its source a secular song in Dutch, by Benedictus Appenzeller; and the Missa Stabat mater uses the motet by Josquin, a composer he evidently admired. Eight of his motets survive, and they vary from four to seven voices; his famous O mors inevitabilis, a lament on the death of Josquin des Prez, is for seven. This is one of his most often recorded pieces in the present day, sometimes paired with Gombert's similar lament on Josquin's death, Musae Jovis; it has even been used as background music in a 2005 computer game, Civilization IV.

The three known secular songs by Vinders, "Myns liefkens bruyn ooghen", "Och rat van aventueren", and "O wrede fortune", are all in Dutch, suggesting that this may have been his native language in bilingual Ghent; many of the composers from that area wrote French chansons, but if Vinders did, none have survived. The secular pieces are for four to six voices.

The first recording dedicated to Vinders' works was recently recorded by the Choir of Sidney Sussex College, Cambridge with Andrew Lawrence-King, (renaissance harp and psaltery) and directed by David Skinner (musicologist) on the Inventa Records label.
