= Pro Musica Antiqua =

Pro Musica Antiqua (Latin, "for ancient music") may refer to:

- The Pro Musica Antiqua song by jazz performer Blossom Dearie from her LB My New Celebrity Is You
- Pro Musica Antiqua of Brussels, 1930s ensemble of Safford Cape
- New York Pro Musica, founded (1952) as Pro Musica Antiqua, ensemble specializing in Medieval and Renaissance music
- Pro Musica Antiqua (Polish ensemble), 1992

== See also ==
- Pro Cantione Antiqua, English early music group
