= The Long Day Closes (film) =

1992 film by Terence Davies

- Theatrical release poster
- Directed by: Terence Davies
- Written by: Terence Davies
- Produced by: Olivia Stewart
- Starring: Marjorie Yates; Leigh McCormack; Anthony Watson; Nicholas Lamont; Ayse Owens
- Cinematography: Michael Coulter
- Edited by: William Diver
- Music by: Bob Last; Robert Lockhart
- Production companies: British Film Institute; Film Four International
- Distributed by: Mayfair Entertainment
- Release dates: 13 May 1992 (Cannes); 22 May 1992
- Running time: 85 minutes
- Country: United Kingdom
- Language: English
- Budget: £1.7 million
- Box office: £212,000 (UK)

The Long Day Closes is a 1992 British drama film written and directed by Terence Davies and starring Marjorie Yates, Leigh McCormack, Anthony Watson, Nicholas Lamont and Ayes Owens. It was entered into the 1992 Cannes Film Festival.

== Plot ==
The film is set in Liverpool in the mid-1950s. The story concerns a shy twelve-year-old boy, Bud, and his loving mother and siblings. He lives a life rich in imagination, centred on family relationships, church, and his struggles at school. Music and snatches of movie dialogue allow him to enrich his narrow physical environment. "Together these fragments", wrote Stephen Holden in The New York Times, "evoke a postwar England starved for beauty, fantasy and a place to escape."

== Cast ==
- Marjorie Yates as Mother
- Leigh McCormack as Bud
- Anthony Watson as Kevin
- Nicholas Lamont as John
- Ayse Owens as Helen
- Tina Malone as Edna
- Jimmy Wilde as Curly
- Robin Polley as Mr. Nicholls
- Pete Ivatts as Mr. Bushell
- Joy Blakeman as Frances
- Denise Thomas as Jean
- Patricia Morison as Amy (as Patricia Morrison)
- Gavin Mawdslay as Billy (as Gavin Mawdslay)
- Kirk McLaughlin as Labourer / Christ
- Mark Heath as Black Man
- Victoria Davies as Nun
- Brenda Peters as Nurse
- Kerl Skeggs as Albie
- Lee Blennerhassett as 1st Bully
- Peter Hollier as 2nd Bully
- Jason Jevons as 3rd Bully

== Music ==
The film uses 35 pieces of music, including renditions of songs by Nat King Cole.

Critic David Thomson in his April 2007 review of the film in the British Film Institute's Sight & Sound magazine draws attention to the music that was used in the film, in particular "at the end of the film ... that mackerel sky and Sir Arthur Sullivan's 'The Long Day Closes' itself" sung by Pro Cantione Antiqua.

== Production ==
The film was filmed in sets built in Rotherhithe London at Sands Films Studio under the meticulous instructions of the director.

== Reception ==
On the review aggregator website Rotten Tomatoes, the film has an 81% approval rating based on reviews from 21 critics, with an average rating of 7.60 out of 10. On Metacritic, the film received a weighted average score of 85/100 based on 15 critics, indicating "universal acclaim".

A 2009 appreciation by Dennis Lim said:

Working with the most basic and most ethereal of cinematic materials — time and memory — Mr. Davies has devised a mosaiclike film language. Childhood recollections are consecrated as moments out of time and assembled into a symphonic collage, guided more by emotional logic than by plot or chronology. The working-class milieu that tends to be associated with the drab naturalism of the British kitchen-sink school, here comes swaddled in sensory delights: stately tracking shots and overhead angles, gusts of Mahler and Nat King Cole. The overall effect is one of muted rapture, a swelling ecstasy held in check by a constant tug of sadness.

"Together these fragments", wrote Stephen Holden in The New York Times, "evoke a postwar England starved for beauty, fantasy and a place to escape...The Long Day Closes is filled with surreal, expressionistic touches that lend it the aura of a phantasmagoric cinematic poem."

On IndieWire's 2022 'The 100 Best Movies of the 90s' list, the film was crowned the ninth best film of its decade. Critic David Ehrlich writes "Davies’ fading slipstream of a film drifts through the rain and rubble of postwar England with the meticulousness of a Wes Anderson movie, eventually freezing over into a delicate snow-globe that swirls the pain of repression into the pleasure of self-discovery."

== Awards and nominations ==
Year	Award	Category	Nominee	Result	Ref.
1992	Cannes Film Festival	Palme d'Or	The Long Day Closes	Nominated	
1992	Evening Standard British Film Awards	Best Screenplay	Terence Davies	Won	
1992	Valladolid International Film Festival	Golden Spike	Terence Davies	Won	
