= Mass for Five Voices =

Choral Mass setting

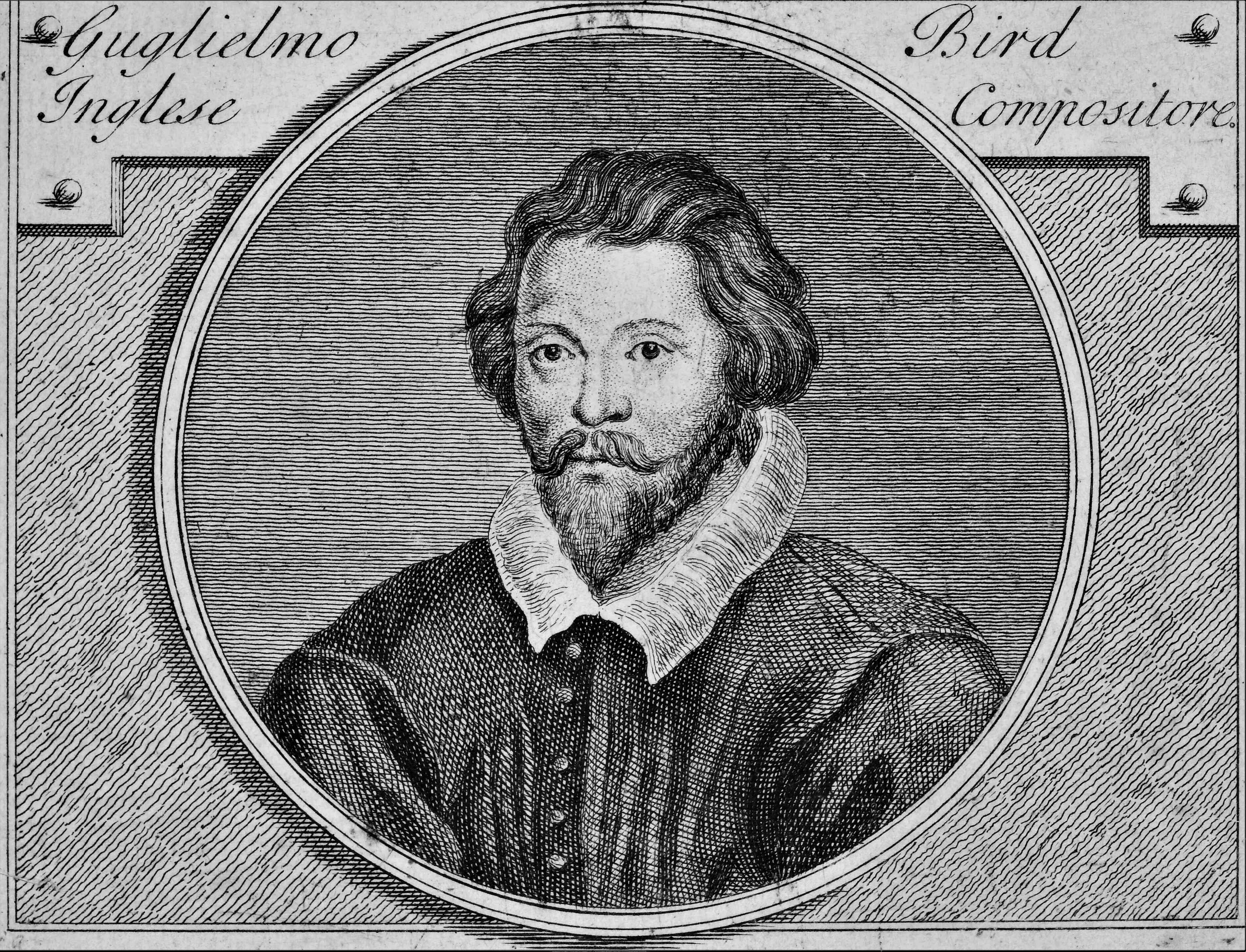
An etching of William Byrd

The Mass for Five Voices is a choral Mass setting by the English composer William Byrd (c. 1540–1623). It was probably written c. 1594 during the reign of Queen Elizabeth I, and is one of three settings of the Mass Ordinary which Byrd published in the early 1590s. It consists of the text of the Mass (Kyrie, Gloria, Credo, Sanctus and Agnus Dei) set for a five-part choir.

== Historical background ==
William Byrd in his later years turned towards Catholicism, and from 1584 was known by the authorities not to attend Anglican church services. England at the end of the 16th century was intensely hostile to open Catholics. A law of 1581 made it treason to be absolved from schism and reconciled with Rome, and the fine for recusancy was increased to £20 per month (50 times an artisan's wage). Afterwards, executions of Catholic priests became more common, and in 1585, it became treason for a Catholic priest to enter the country, as well as for anyone to aid or shelter him. In this climate it is remarkable that Byrd should have ventured on writing and publishing any Latin Mass, but Byrd wrote three, for three, four and five voices.

== Composition and publication ==
In the 1590s the recusant Sir John Petre maintained under his protection in and around the village of Stondon Massey, Essex, something of a Catholic community. Byrd moved there in 1593, and it is thought most likely, though by no means certain, that Byrd wrote his Mass for Five Voices towards the beginning of his Stondon Massey years. No independent manuscripts of this Mass survive, and we are therefore dependent on the surviving copies of the published score. This, like his other Mass settings, was issued without title-page or any indication of the printer or date of publication, but bibliographical analysis by Peter Clulow has established that it was printed in 1594 or 1595. All of the extant copies are bound with Byrd's Gradualia.

== Commentary ==
The text of this Mass, like Byrd's two others, is in accordance with the decision of the Council of Trent that the full Ordinary was always to be used, including the Kyrie. The five parts are treble (or soprano), alto, two tenors and bass, and since any performance would necessarily have been surreptitious, Byrd would doubtless have expected there to be very few singers, perhaps only one, to a part. The vocal texture makes the text easily comprehensible and clarifies the structure of the piece. This Mass is more modal in character than its three- and four-voice counterparts, and more compact, closely argued and simple in style than Byrd's earlier choral music for five parts. In many places it is closely comparable with late-16th century Masses by Continental composers, though it differs from almost all of them in being freely composed rather than based on a motet or plainchant. Byrd's writing in this Mass is reserved, distant and austere, but conveys his intense feeling for the meaning of the words, especially in the Dona nobis pacem passage.

== Rediscovery ==
This, like Byrd's other Masses, was probably unperformed for some 300 years until it was revived at the end of the 19th century. An edition of it by William Barclay Squire and Richard Terry in 1899 led to a series of performances: by the choir of Downside Abbey at the dedication of St Benedict's Church, Ealing in November 1899; three performances the following year under the direction of Hans Richter, Henry Watson and Richard Terry; and regularly at Westminster Cathedral under Terry from 1902. The Sanctus was sung at the coronation of George VI in 1937, and the first of many recordings of the complete Mass was made by the Fleet Street Choir under Thomas Lawrence in 1942. Though once considered dry and of solely academic interest, it is now acknowledged to be a masterpiece of English sacred music.
