= Magdala (ensemble) =

Magdala is an English early music group founded by David Skinner, a musicologist at the University of Cambridge.

== Discography ==
- "A Gift for a King: a Florentine offering to Henry VIII," Latin motets from the Newberry-Oscott partbooks. Magdala, David Skinner The Gift of Music (record label)
- "Magnificat" - motets by Clemens non Papa, Robert Fayrfax, Francesco de Layolle, Jean Lhéritier, Jacquet of Mantua, Jean Richafort, John Sheppard. Magdala, David Skinner
