= The Cardinall's Musick =

British vocal ensemble

The Cardinall's Musick is a United Kingdom-based vocal ensemble specialising in music of the 16th and 17th centuries and contemporary music. It was founded by the scholar and musicologist David Skinner and the singer / director Andrew Carwood.

Taking its name from the 16th-century English cardinal, Thomas Wolsey, the group’s reputation grew through its extensive study of music from the English Renaissance. Originally an a cappella vocal group founded in 1989, The Cardinall's Musick embraces a wide range of styles and periods: from a complete reconstruction of a Tudor mass in Hampton Court to the world premieres of commissions from composers Michael Finnissy, Matthew Martin, Judith Weir and Simon Whalley. Their repertoire has grown to include music from many different countries.

The Cardinall’s Musick has produced over 25 CDs on the ASV/Gaudeamus label: they are now exclusive artists with Hyperion Records. Their discography includes compositions by Nicholas Ludford, William Cornysh, Robert Fayrfax, John Merbecke, John Sheppard, Thomas Tallis and most recently by Robert Parsons, and by the continental greats Lassus, Palestrina, Victoria and Hieronymus Praetorius. In 2010 they completed their survey of the Latin Church Music of the English composer, William Byrd: the 13th and final volume was released on the Hyperion label in February 2010, and won the Gramophone Award for Early Music, and the 2010 'Recording of the Year'.

== Selected discography ==
- Thomas Tallis: Spem in alium & other sacred music with Andrew Carwood, director (Hyperion Records, CDA68156, 2016)
- Thomas Tallis: Lamentations & other sacred music with Andrew Carwood, director (Hyperion Records, CDA68121, 2016)
- Thomas Tallis: Ave, Dei patris filia & other sacred music with Andrew Carwood, director (Hyperion Records, CDA68095, 2015)
- Thomas Tallis: Ave, rosa sine spinis & other sacred music with Andrew Carwood, director (Hyperion Records, CDA68076, 2015)
- Gregorio Allegri: Miserere & the music of Rome with Andrew Carwood, director (Hyperion Records, CDA67860, 2011)
- William Byrd: Infelix ego & other sacred music with Andrew Carwood, director (Hyperion Records, CDA67779, 2010)
- Francisco Guerrero: Missa Congratulamini mihi & other works with Andrew Carwood, director (Hyperion Records, CDA67836, 2010)
- William Byrd: Laudibus in sanctis & other sacred music with Andrew Carwood, director (Hyperion Records, CDA67568, 2006)
- Thomas Tallis: Gaude gloriosa & other sacred music with Andrew Carwood, director (Hyperion Records, CDA67548, 2005)
