= Francisco Guerrero (composer) =

Spanish Catholic priest and composer

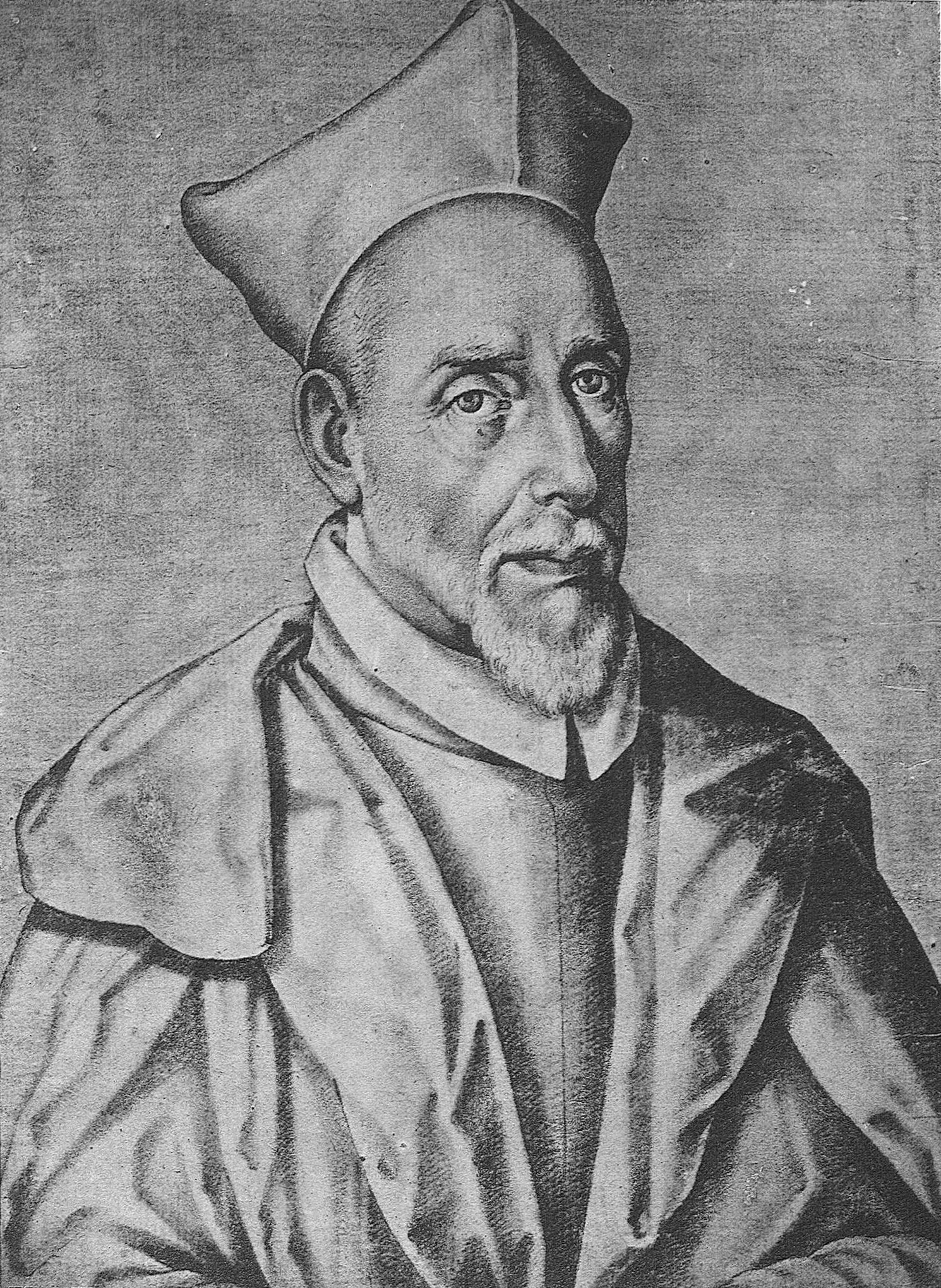
Francisco Guerrero

Francisco Guerrero (October 4 (?), 1528 – November 8, 1599) was a Spanish Catholic priest and composer of the Renaissance. He was born and died in Seville.

== Life and career ==
Guerrero's early musical education was with his older brother Pedro and after that with the famous composer Cristóbal de Morales. At the age of 18 he was appointed maestro de capilla (i.e. music director) at Jaén Cathedral. Three years later he accepted a position of singer at Seville Cathedral. During this time he was much in demand as a singer and composer, establishing an exceptional reputation before his thirtieth birthday; in addition he published several collections of his music abroad, an unusual event for a young composer.

After several decades of working and traveling throughout Spain and Portugal, sometimes in the employ of emperor Maximilian II, he went to Italy for a year (1581–1582) where he published two books of his music. After returning to Spain for several years, he decided to travel to the Holy Land, which he finally was able to do in 1589. His adventure included visits to Damascus, Bethlehem, and Jerusalem; on the return trip his ship was twice attacked by pirates, who threatened his life, stole his money, and held him for ransom. He was able to return to Spain; unfortunately he had no money, and endured a series of misfortunes, including some time spent in debtors' prison. At last his old employer at Seville Cathedral extricated Guerrero and he resumed working for them. His book on his adventurous visit to the Holy Land was published in 1590 and was a popular success (it is reasonable to suppose that Cervantes knew it). At the end of the decade he planned one more trip to the Holy Land but died in the plague of 1599 in Seville before he was able to depart.

Of all the Spanish Renaissance composers, he lived and worked the most in Spain. Others—for example Morales and Victoria—spent large portions of their careers in Italy (though, unlike many Franco-Flemish composers of the time, Spanish composers usually returned home later in life).

Guerrero's music was both sacred and secular, unlike that of Victoria and Morales, the two other Spanish 16th-century composers of the first rank. He wrote numerous secular songs and instrumental pieces, in addition to masses, motets, and Passions. He was able to capture an astonishing variety of moods in his music, from ecstasy to despair, longing, joy, and devotional stillness; his music remained popular for hundreds of years, especially in cathedrals in Latin America. Stylistically he preferred homophonic textures, rather like his Spanish contemporaries, and he wrote memorable, singable lines. One interesting feature of his style is how he anticipated functional harmonic usage: there is a case of a Magnificat discovered in Lima, Peru, once thought to be an anonymous 18th century work, which turned out to be a work of his.

== Recordings ==
- Francisco Guerrero, Missa Sancta Et Immaculata, Motets, Etc. James O'Donnell, Westminster Cathedral Choir. Helios CDH55313
- Francisco Guerrero, Magnificat, Lamentations & Canciones. Peter Phillips, El León de Oro. Hyperion CDA68347
- Francisco Guerrero, Missa Congratulamini mihi & other works. Andrew Carwood, The Cardinall's Musick. Hyperion CDA67836
- Francisco Guerrero, Missa De la batalla escoutez & other works. James O'Donnell, Westminster Cathedral Choir, His Majestys Sagbutts & Cornetts. Helios CDH55340
- Francisco Guerrero, Missa Surge Propera. Peter Philips, Tallis Scholars. CDGIM040
- Francisco Guerrero, Missa Super Flumina Babylonis. Michael Noone, Ensemble Plus Ultra. GCD922005
- Francisco Guerrero, Requiem & Vespers for All Saints. Alistair Dixon, Chapelle du Roi. Signum SIGCD017
- Apollo5, Where All Roses Go, includes Veni Domine,Oh, Virgen, cuando os miro, and Virgen Sancta, VOCES8 Records, UNSPSC Code 55111500
- Fracisco Guerrero, Missa Iste sanctus in O Beata Virgo Maria: Renaissance & Contemporary Choral Works, David Bray, Luminatus, Convivium Records, 2023.
