= Pro Musica Antiqua (Polish ensemble) =

Pro Musica Antiqua is a Polish classical chamber group founded by the flautist Leszek Szarzyński in Olsztyn in 1992. The chamber ensemble specializes in baroque and early classical music of Eastern Europe.
