= David Skinner (musicologist) =

British musicologist and choir director

- Education: University of Edinburgh; Christ Church, Oxford (DPhil)
- Occupations: Musicologist, choir director
- Employer: Sidney Sussex College, Cambridge
- Known for: Founder of Alamire; cofounder of Magdala and The Cardinall's Musick
- Children: Robin, Micah
- Awards: Gramophone Awards, Diapason d'Or, Deutsche Schallplatten

David Skinner is a British musicologist and choir director. He works at the University of Cambridge, where he is the director of music at Sidney Sussex College and is an affiliated lecturer, teaching historical and practical topics from the medieval and Renaissance periods. He is the founder of the vocal consort Alamire, and the cofounder of the vocal ensembles Magdala and The Cardinall's Musick. He has produced more than 25 recordings. He has been associated with a number of award-winning projects (including two Gramophone Awards and three runners up; Diapason d'Or; Deutsche Schallplatten; and a Grammy nomination).

== Early life and education ==
Skinner grew up in the United States. Skinner was educated at the University of Edinburgh. From 1989 to 1994, Skinner was a choral scholar at Christ Church of the University of Oxford. He would receive his DPhil at Christ Church in 1995 for a biography of Nicholas Ludford and a critical edition of Ludford's antiphons. From 1997 to 2001, Skinner was a postdoctoral fellow at Christ Church. He was a member of the Christ Church Cathedral choir for six years, as an academical clerk and a lay clerk.

== Career ==
Skinner has taught at the University of Oxford, University of Glasgow, University of Cambridge, and Royal Holloway College. Skinner was a lecturer in music at Magdalen College at the University of Oxford from 2001 to 2006.

With Andrew Carwood, Skinner cofounded The Cardinall's Musick in 1989. Skinner is the artistic director for the group, which in 2010 won the Gramophone magazine's ‘Recording of the Year’. This was only the second time that a recording of Early Music had won this award.

Skinner founded the consort Alamire in 2005. With the music group Fretwork and the Choir of Sidney Sussex College, Alamire won "Editor's Choice" and "CD of the Month" in Gramophone for February 2008. In 2011, Alamire commenced a ten-year programme with Obsidian Records to explore English choral music between the 15th and mid-17th century, although the death of Martin Souter, Obsidian's founder, interrupted this project. Subsequent releases have appeared on the Inventa Records label.

Skinner received a 2015 Gramophone Award for Alamire's recording of The Spy's Choirbook in this series, and their next recording, of Anne Boleyn's Songbook, won Australia's Limelight Award and was nominated for a BBC Music Magazine Award. The last project in the series to date built on Skinner's identification of Henry VIII's last queen Catherine Parr as author of an alternative text for one of Thomas Tallis's major motets.

His 2012 release of the works of the Renaissance composer Thomas Weelkes with the Choir of Sidney Sussex College was nominated for a Gramophone Award as well, with critics praising the choir's "exemplary ensemble and intonation, beauty of tone, clarity of diction, and interpretive expressiveness".

== Personal life ==
He is the father of singer-songwriter Robin Daniel Skinner, known professionally as Cavetown.

== Bibliography ==
=== Books ===
- The Arundel Choirbook (Duke of Norfolk: Roxburghe Club, 2003).
- Nicholas Ludford I: Mass Inclina cor meum and Antiphons, Early English Church Music, 44 (London: Stainer & Bell, 2003).
- Nicholas Ludford II: Six-part Masses and Magnificat, Early English Church Music, 46 (London: Stainer & Bell, 2005).
- The Tallis Psalter: Psalms And Anthems (London: Novello & Co, 2013)

=== Articles ===
- ‘The Marian Anthem in Late Medieval England’, in The Church and Mary, Studies in Church History, 39 (Boydell & Brewer, 2004), 168—80.
- ‘A new Elizabethan keyboard source in the archives of Arundel Castle’, BRIO, 39 (Spring/Summer, 2002), 18—25.
- ‘Music and the Reformation at Magdalen’, Magdalen College Record (2002), 79—83.
- ‘Discovering the provenance and history of the Caius and Lambeth choirbooks’, Early Music, 25 (1997), 245—66.
- ‘William Cornysh: Clerk or Courtier?’, The Musical Times (May, 1997), 5—17.
- ‘At the mynde of Nycholas Ludford: new light on Ludford from the churchwardens’ accounts of St Margaret’s, Westminster’, Early Music, 22 (1994), 393—413.

== Selected recordings ==
- Thomas Tallis & William Byrd: Cantiones Sacrae 1575, Alamire, Obsidian Records.
- Thomas Tomkins: These Distracted Times, Alamire, Fretwork, and the Choir of Sidney Sussex College, Cambridge, Obsidian Records.
- Josquin Desprez: Missa D’ung aultre amer, Motets & Chansons, Alamire, Andrew Lawrence-King, Obsidian Records.
- Philippe Verdelot: Madrigals for a Tudor King, Alamire, Obsidian Records.
- In Ages Past: Collection of Popular Hymns, Choir of Sidney Sussex College, Cambridge, Classical Communications, 2006.
- Music from the Court of Henry VIII, Alamire, Manus Records (2006).
- A Gift for a King: a Florentine Offering to Henry VIII, Magdala (2006).
- Music for Princes and Ambassadors, Magdala, Classical Communications, (2005).
- Sanctus, Magdala, Classical Communications, (2005).
- Christmas Meditations, Magdala, Classical Communications, (2004).
- Treasury of Saints, Magdala, Classical Communications, (2003).
- Glory of Gothic (for V&A Enterprises), Magdala, Classical Communications, (2002).
- The Byrd Edition, The Cardinall's Musick, 9 CDs on Sanctuary Classics, remaining 5 CDs on Hyperion Records
- William Cornysh: Latin Church Music, The Cardinall's Musick, ASV Gaudeamus Records, 1997.
- John Merbecke: Latin Church Music, The Cardinall's Musick, ASV Gaudeaumus Records, 1996.
- Robert Fayrfax: Collected works, The Cardinall's Musick, 5-CD set, ASV Gaudeamus Records, 1995—99.
- Nicholas Ludford: Collected works, The Cardinall's Musick, 4-CD set, ASV Gaudeamus Records, 1993—94.
