= Pro Cantione Antiqua =

English early music group

Pro Cantione Antiqua of London (PCA) is a British choral group which was founded in 1968 by tenor James Griffett, counter-tenor Paul Esswood, and conductor and producer Mark Brown. Their first concert was at St Bartholomew's, Smithfield with Brian Brockless conducting but, from an early stage, they were closely associated with conductor and musicologist Bruno Turner. Arguably, they were the leading British performers of a cappella music, especially early music, prior to the founding of the Tallis Scholars.

Singers have included:

- countertenors: Paul Esswood, Tom Sutcliffe, Geoffrey Mitchell, James Bowman, Keith Davis, Timothy Penrose, Kevin Smith, Michael Chance, Ashley Stafford, Richard Hill and Charles Brett.
- tenors: Paul Elliott, James Griffett, James Lewington, Ian Partridge, Ian Thompson and Andrew Carwood.
- basses: David Beavan, Ian Caddy, Brian Etheridge, Michael George, Christopher Keyte, Christopher Underwood, Stephen Roberts, David Thomas and Adrian Peacock.
- Though principally an all-male group it has been supplemented with female voices where appropriate (e.g. for the 1978 recordings OUP 151/2 under Philip Ledger, to accompany The Oxford Book of English Madrigals)

== Discography ==
=== Archiv ===
PCA's 6-LP set 'The Flowering of Renaissance Polyphony' (Geistliche Musik der Renaissance') issued on Archiv in the late 1970s was particularly influential. This was subsequently reissued with other material for Archiv as 7-CD:

- CD1: John Dunstable, Guillaume Dufay, Gilles Binchois: Motets
- CD2: Antoine Busnois, Josquin des Prez: Masses
- CD3: Ockeghem Missa "Pro defunctis" - Desprez Two motets - Jacob Obrecht
- CD4: La Rue, Isaac, Brumel, Mouton, Compère Motets
- CD5: Gombert, Arcadelt, Willaert, Clemens non Papa, Rore, Handl-Gallus, De Monte, Vinders: Motets.
- CD6: Lassus 2 Penitential Psalms. Palestrina Motets.
- CD7: Morales Motets, Palestrina Missa "Aeterna Christi munera"
- The Triumphs of Oriana Pro Cantione Antiqua directed by Ian Partridge DC Archiv 2533 237 35 Madrigals

=== DHM ===
- Musik der Tudor Zeit. DHM
- Ockeghem Missa Ecce Ancilla Domini DHM
- William Byrd Mass for 4 voices.
- Josquin des Prez (1440–1521) Motets. Benedicta es coelorum regina; Tu solus qui facis mirabilia; ominus regnavit; Ave Maria, virgo serena; Miserere mei Deus; Inviolata, integra et casta es, Maria. Tölzer Knabenchor, Pro Cantione Antiqua, Collegium Aureum, DHM
- Weihnachtsgesänge des 15.Jahrhunderts. Christmas songs of the 15th Century. Pro Cantione Antiqua. Turner. DHM
- Lassus Missa Puisque J'Ay Perdu. Musica Dei Donum. Lauda Sion Salvatorem. Pro Cantione Antiqua, Turner DHM
- Lassus Requiem. O bone Jesu. Pro Cantione Antiqua, Turner DHM
- Tomás Luis de Victoria Tenebrae Responsories DHM.

=== Hyperion ===
- Palestrina Canticum canticorum. Turner Hyperion.
- Lassus. Works for Easter 2CD. Hyperion
- Francisco de Peñalosa (1470–1537) Complete motets. Bruno Turner. Hyperion. reissued Helios 2009
- Music of the Portuguese renaissance. Diogo Dias Melgás, Esteban López Morago. Pro Cantione Antiqua, Brown. Hyperion.

=== Carlton ===
- Palestrina Missa Papae Marcelli Stabat Mater;Missa l'Homme Arme. Alma Redemptoris Mater. Peccantem Me Quotidie Pro Cantione Antiqua, Lamentations. Bruno Turner, Mark Brown. Carlton. Reissued Alto 1CD. Reissued Brilliant 5CD.
- Gregorian chant.
- Sing we pleasure. Madrigals Wilbye, Weelkes, Gibbons, Farnaby, Byrd, Morley, Tomkins, Greaves, Farmer, Kirbye, Ward, Bennet, East, Bateson Pro Cantione Antiqua. reissue Alto.
- Tears and Lamentations. Browne, Pygott, Davy, Sheryngham, Banastir, Cornyshe, Whyte, Anonymous. reissued Regis.
- The Edwardian gentleman's songbook. Ballads & Glees von Bishop, Stevenson, Hatton, Smart, Stanfort, Paxton, Somerville, Bridge, Foster, Sullivan. James Griffett, Pro Cantione Antiqua. Carlton. Reissue Alto.

=== Other labels ===
- El Siglo de oro - Spanische Kirchenmusik der Renaissance. Victoria, Guerrero, Lobo, Esquivel, Ceballos, Pro Cantione Antiqua, Turner 2 CDs Das Alte Werk, Teldec.
- Purcell in the Ale House, part-songs by Purcell, Ravenscroft, Bennet, Pearce, Browne, Isham, Dowland, Campion, Pilkington, Coleman Brown, Partridge, Wilson. Pro Cantione Antiqua Teldec. reissue Apex.
- Monteverdi Vespers. 2CD Pro Cantione Antiqua, Knabenchor Hannover, Collegium Aureum, Musica Fiata, dir Hennig. Ars Musici.
- Pietro Allori (1925–1985), Sacred works. Mark Brown
- A Medieval Christmas (accompanied by the Medieval Wind Ensemble), dir. Mark Brown, Innovative Music Productions (PCD 844), 1986
- The Gregorian Lent and Easter, dir. James O'Donnell, Musica di Angeli (99182)
- A Gregorian Advent and Christmas, dir. James O'Donnell, The United Recording Company (CD-88007), 1993
- Gregorian Feast, dir. Mark Brown, recorded 1990–2, Regis Records Ltd (RRC 1217), 2005
- Sacred Music by Heinrich Schütz, dir. Edgar Fleet, Pro Cantione Antiqua, London Cornett and Sackbut Ensemble, Restoration Academy, Academy Sound and Vision (1979)
