= Pierre Alamire =

German-Dutch music copyist and composer

Pierre Alamire (also Petrus Alamire; probable birth name Peter van den Hove; c. 1470 – 26 June 1536) was a German-Dutch music copyist, composer, instrumentalist, mining engineer, merchant, diplomat and spy of the Renaissance. He was one of the most skilled music scribes of his time, and many now-famous works of Franco-Flemish composers owe their survival to his renowned illuminated manuscript copies; in addition he was a spy for the court of Henry VIII of England.

== Life ==
Alamire was born to a family of merchants in Nuremberg, Bavaria, Holy Roman Empire but came to the Seventeen Provinces at an early age. Alamire was not his real name; the name was a musical reference, "A" (the musical pitch) plus the solmization syllables "la", "mi" and "re" (scale steps six, three and two respectively). Most likely his actual name was van den Hove (or Imhoff, Imhove), although details on his family background are slim.

In the late 1490s he began to receive commissions for work in the Low Countries, for example at 's-Hertogenbosch and Antwerp, where his impressive skill at musical copying and illuminating were immediately valued. This was the period when the explosion of musical creativity in the Low Countries was at its highest; that region was producing more composers than all of the rest of Europe combined, and these composers were emigrating into other areas, especially into royal and aristocratic courts who had the means to employ them.

By 1503 Alamire had already created an edition of music for Philip I of Castile, and by 1509 he was an employee of Archduke Charles, shortly to become Charles V, Holy Roman Emperor. His manuscripts were to become extremely valuable as gifts, as most European nobility at the time prized music, and many votes for the upcoming election of the Holy Roman Emperor would need to be bought.

Alamire moved from Antwerp to Mechelen sometime between 1505 and 1516. Although he traveled frequently, Mechelen was to remain his permanent home from 1516 on.

== Career as a spy ==
Between 1515 and 1518, under cover as a merchant of manuscripts, chaplain, singer, and instrumentalist, he traveled between London and the continent, as a spy for Henry VIII against the pretender to the English throne, Richard de la Pole, who mainly resided in Metz. He was aided in this enterprise by a Flemish sackbut player, Hans Nagel. In June 1516, he went to the Kingdom of England for instruction by the king and Cardinal Thomas Wolsey, carrying music manuscripts and instruments along with him.

Henry VIII and Wolsey came to distrust him, however, and indeed soon learned that he was working as a counter-spy for de la Pole himself; Alamire, valuing his head, wisely never returned to England after this discovery. Unsurprisingly, few English composers are represented in his manuscripts.

During the 1520s Alamire was a diplomat and courtier in addition to continuing his activity as a music illustrator and copyist. He carried letters between many of the leading humanists of the time. Erasmus described him as "not unwitty", and Alamire's frequent scurrilous commentary on contemporary singers and players bears this out; many of his letters survive, and they are filled with epigrams and clever insults.

Music was not his only skill; he received a generous payment on behalf of King Christian II of Denmark for instruction in the "craft of mining" (unless that was a metaphor for spying; but more details of this commission are not known).

In 1534 Alamire received a generous pension from Maria of Austria, for whom he had written a number of manuscripts in the early 1530s, and he disappears from court records after that time. He died in Mechelen.

== Manuscript contents and locations ==
Most of the works of the first rank of Franco-Flemish composers are represented in Alamire's manuscripts, including Johannes Ockeghem, Josquin des Prez, Pierre Moulu, Heinrich Isaac, Adrian Willaert, and Pierre de la Rue; indeed de la Rue, the favorite composer of Margaret of Austria, has by far the most pieces of any composer, and almost his entire output is preserved in Alamire's manuscript collection.

Manuscripts copied by Alamire can be found in many European libraries, including the Habsburg court library in Vienna, in London (the Henry VIII manuscript), the Vatican (a manuscript for Pope Leo X), Brussels, Munich, and Jena, which has the court books for Frederick III, Elector of Saxony.

Only one work is attributed with certainty to Alamire, a four-part instrumental piece Tandernaken op den Rijn; however his evident skill and experience as a composer suggests that many of the anonymous works of the time may be his.

== References and further reading ==
- Herbert Kellman: "Pierre Alamire", The New Grove Dictionary of Music and Musicians, ed. Stanley Sadie. 20 vol. London, Macmillan Publishers Ltd., 1980. ISBN 1-56159-174-2
- Herbert Kellman: "Pierre Alamire", Grove Music Online ed. L. Macy (Accessed November 4, 2005), (subscription access) (some information updated from earlier Grove entry)
- Eugeen Schreurs, Alamire Foundation, K. U. Leuven, program notes to Naxos CD 8.554744: The A-La-Mi-Re Manuscripts: Flemish Polyphonic Treasures for Charles V, sung by Capilla Flamenca
- Allan W. Atlas, Renaissance Music: Music in Western Europe, 1400–1600. New York, W.W. Norton & Co., 1998. ISBN 0-393-97169-4
- María R. Montes, "Petrus Alamire. Música e intriga en el Renacimiento flamenco", in Síneris. Revista de musicología (sp).
- Andrew Taykor, The World of Gerard Mercator: The Mapmaker Who Revolutionized Geography. New York, Walker and Company, 2004. ISBN 0-8027-1377-7
