= Andrew Carwood =

Andrew Carwood MBE
- Born: 1965
- Occupation: Choral musician

Andrew Carwood MBE (born 30 April 1965) is the Director of Music at St Paul's Cathedral in London and director of The Cardinall's Musick.

== Biography ==
He was educated at The John Lyon School, Harrow, and at St John's College, Cambridge, where he was a choral scholar in Choir of St John's College, Cambridge, under George Guest. He was subsequently a lay clerk at Christ Church, Oxford, and at Westminster Cathedral, before he became Director of Music at the London Oratory Church for five years.

== Career ==
He is known for his singing of the English repertoire, from consort songs by William Byrd to the role of the Male Chorus in Benjamin Britten’s The Rape of Lucretia and for baroque music. He has performed with many of the leading British ensembles both on recordings and in concerts throughout the world, including with the Tallis Scholars, the Orlando Consort, the Oxford Camerata and Pro Cantione Antiqua. He has had solo roles for George Guest, Sir Roger Norrington, Joshua Rifkin, Harry Christophers, Richard Hickox, Paul McCreesh, Stephen Darlington, Philippe Herreweghe, Robert King and Christopher Hogwood. He is represented by Rayfield Artists.

His discography includes performances of works by Hassler, Vivaldi, Purcell, Haydn, Warlock, Grainger, Howells, Poulenc, Janáček and Christopher Headington.

He conducts The Cardinall’s Musick who have performed throughout the United Kingdom and Europe, and recorded over 30 performances of renaissance music. He has worked as guest conductor with The Sixteen, The King’s Consort, and the BBC Singers.

He is an expert on music of the 16th and 17th centuries. He was the Music Advisor for the National Theatre’s 2001 production of Luther by John Osborne, and in 1995, 2006, and 2007 he won the Gramophone Early Music Award. He is Director of the Schola Cantorum at the annual Edington Festival and was made an Associate of the Royal School of Church Music in 2005. In 2007 he was appointed Principal Guest Conductor of the BBC Singers. In 2010 he once again won the Gramophone Award for Early Music and the Gramophone Record of the Year Award.

He was appointed to succeed Malcolm Archer as Director of Music at St Paul's Cathedral, London, from September 2007, and is the first non-organist to hold that post since the 12th century.

Carwood was appointed Member of the Order of the British Empire (MBE) in the 2022 New Year Honours for services to choral music.

| Preceded by Malcolm Archer | Director of Music, St Paul's Cathedral; 2007–present | Succeeded by Incumbent |
