= Oxford Pro Musica Singers =

Oxford Pro Musica Singers (OPMS) is a chamber choir based in Oxford, England.

Founded by Michael Smedley in 1977 as the Oxford Pro Musica Chorus to accompany the Oxford Pro Musica Orchestra, the choir soon took on a life of its own and performed regularly in Oxford as well as three of London's main concert halls: St John's, Smith Square, the Queen Elizabeth Hall and the Purcell Room. The choir reached the final of BBC/Sainsbury's Choir of the Year competition and won a Bronze Medal in the Llangollen International Eisteddfod, whilst as representatives of the United Kingdom abroad they achieved a Silver Medal in the international 'Florilege Vocal de Tours' competition in France. A recent visit to Europe was a trip to southern Spain in 2012. They have also made several recordings, ranging from folk songs to jazz classics, garnering a rosette from the Penguin CD Guide for their disc of John Tavener, Pärt, and Henryk Górecki. Michael Smedley led the choir for a 25th anniversary concert University Church of St Mary the Virgin, High Street, Oxford, in 2002.

Since the end of 2013, the choir has been directed by Mark Jordan. They perform a wide range of music, from 16th-century polyphony to modern works by composers such as Morten Lauridsen, Ola Gjeilo, and Will Todd, but are also at home with the pillars of the choral repertoire: performances of Rachmaninoff’s All-Night Vigil and Bach’s B Minor Mass in the Sheldonian Theatre in Oxford, with the period orchestra Instruments of Time and Truth, were part of the choir's 2015 season.
