= Jeremy Summerly =

British conductor (born 1961)

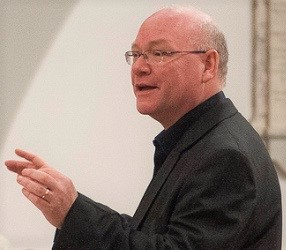

Background information
- Born: 28 February 1961 (age 65)
- Website: jeremysummerly.com

Jeremy Summerly (born 28 February 1961) is a British conductor. He was educated at Lichfield Cathedral School, Winchester College, and New College, Oxford. While at Oxford he conducted the New College Chamber Orchestra and the Oxford Chamber Choir. After graduating with a first-class honours degree in music in 1982, he started work as a studio manager for BBC Radio, while pursuing postgraduate research in historical musicology at King's College London. Since 1991 he has been a presenter and reviewer for BBC's Radios 3 and 4, in particular for Radio 4's Front Row, and Radio 3's Record Review (formerly CD Review).

Since 1983 he has been conductor of the mixed-voice consort at the Edington Music Festival, and in 2012 he was appointed artistic director of Mayfield Festival of Music and the Arts, where he is also conductor of Mayfield Festival Choir.

He founded Oxford Camerata in 1984. In 1989, he was appointed lecturer at the Royal Academy of Music, where he was head of academic studies from 1996 to 2007, and thereafter head of continuing professional development. He was conductor of Schola Cantorum of Oxford from 1990 to 1996. He was made an Honorary Member of the Royal Academy of Music in 2006, and in 2015 he became their Sterndale Bennett Visiting Lecturer in Music.

In 2010, he was appointed director of music at St Luke's Church, Chelsea. He conducted the choir of The Queen's College, Oxford for the 2013–14 academic year, and was director of music at St Peter's College, Oxford, from 2015 to 2019. In 2017, he was made a Fellow of the Royal School of Church Music and he was Visiting Professor of Music History at Gresham College from 2019 to 2022. He has taught at Caius College, Cambridge since 2020, where he is Director of Studies in Music. For Lent Term of 2024 he was Director of Music at Caius as sabbatical cover.

== Discography ==
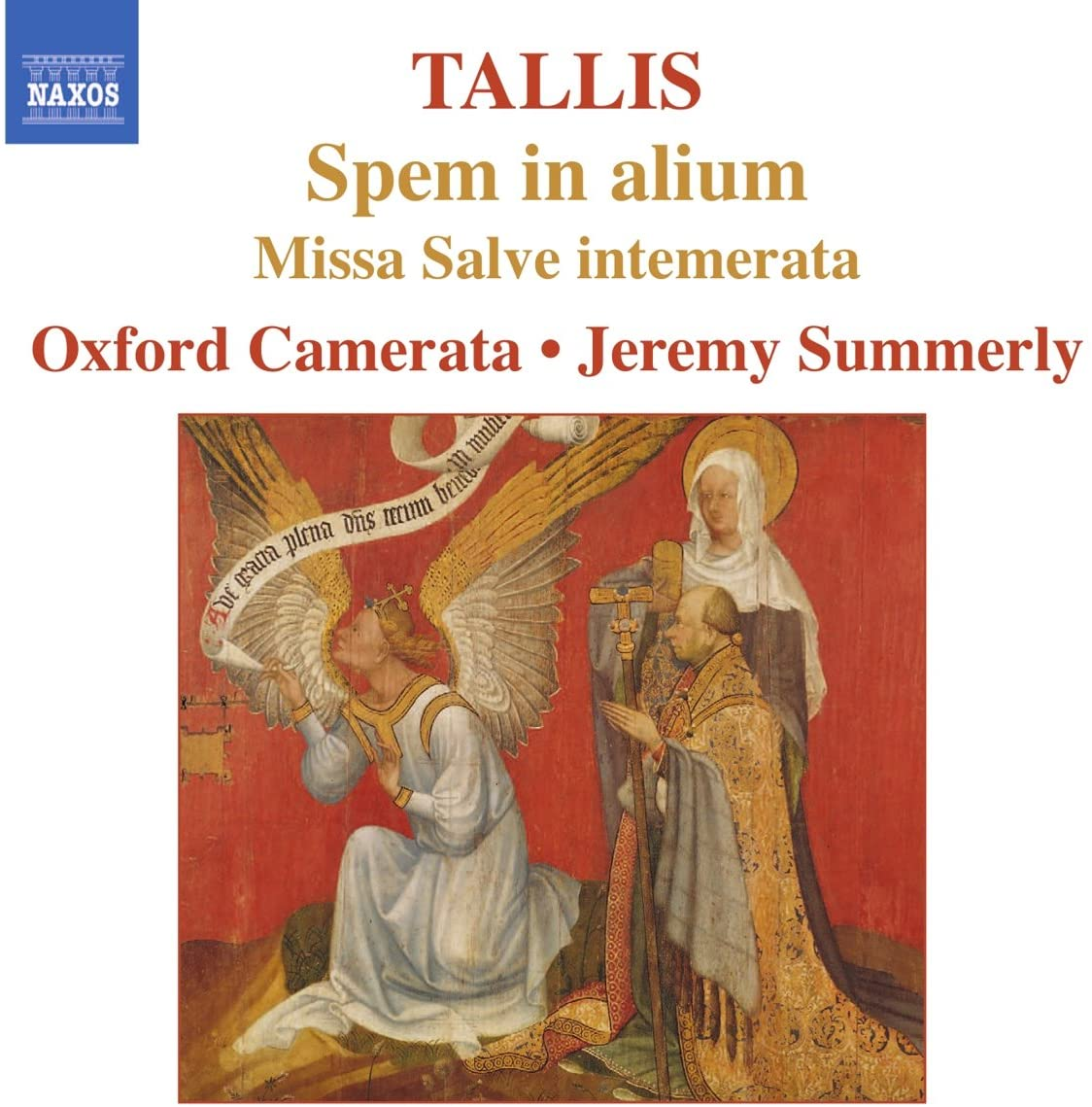
Tallis — Spem in alium, Missa Salve intemerata, 2005

20th-century Sacred Music (Martin, Górecki, Duruflé, Stanford, Byron) Schola Cantorum of Oxford [Proudsound 129]

Lamentations (White, Tallis, Palestrina, Lassus, de Brito) Oxford Camerata [Naxos 8.550572]

Palestrina — Missae Papae Marcelli & Aeterna Christi munera Oxford Camerata [Naxos 8.550573]

Portuguese Requiem Masses (Lôbo, Cardoso) Schola Cantorum of Oxford [Naxos 8.550682]

Byrd — Masses for 4 and 5 Voices & Infelix ego Oxford Camerata [Naxos 8.550574]

Victoria — Missae O magnum mysterium & O quam gloriosum Oxford Camerata [Naxos 8.550575]

Tallis — Mass for Four Voices & Motets Oxford Camerata [Naxos 8.550576]

Gesualdo — Complete Sacred Music for 5 Voices Oxford Camerata [Naxos 8.550742]

Medieval Carols (Hildegard, Abelard, Planctus Guillelmus) Oxford Camerata [Naxos 8.550751]

20th-century Secular Music (Debussy, Ravel, Dallapiccola, Regner) Schola Cantorum of Oxford [Proudsound 130]

Allegri Miserere & Other Choral Masterpieces Oxford Camerata [Naxos 8.550827]

Lassus — Masses for 5 Voices & Infelix ego Oxford Camerata [Naxos 8.550842]

German Sacred Music (Bach, Mendelssohn, Wolf, Schoenberg) Schola Cantorum of Oxford [Proudsound 131]

Renaissance Masterpieces (Ockeghem, Lhéritier, Rogier etc.) Oxford Camerata [Naxos 8.550843]

Fauré — Requiem (1888 reconstruction) & Messe basse Schola Cantorum of Oxford [Naxos 8.550765]

Bach — Magnificat BWV 243 & Cantata BWV 82 Northern Chamber Orchestra / Schola Cantorum of Oxford [Naxos 8.550763]

Vivaldi — Gloria RV 589 & Beatus vir RV 597 Northern Chamber Orchestra / Schola Cantorum of Oxford [Naxos 8.550767]

Palestrina / Lassus — Masses for 8 Voices & Stabat Mater Schola Cantorum of Oxford [Naxos 8.550836]

Tye — Missa Euge bone & Peccavimus cum patribus Oxford Camerata [Naxos 8.550937]

Purcell — Full Anthems & Organ Music Oxford Camerata [Naxos 8.553129]

Dufay — Missa L’homme armé Oxford Camerata [Naxos 8.553087]

Ockeghem — Missa L’homme armé Oxford Camerata [Naxos 8.554297]

Josquin — Missa L’homme armé sexti toni Oxford Camerata [Naxos 8.553428]

Hildegard — Heavenly Revelations Oxford Camerata [Naxos 8.550998]

Schütz — Psalmen Davids Oxford Camerata [Naxos 8.553044]

English Madrigals & Songs Oxford Camerata [Naxos 8.553088]

Gibbons — Choral & Organ Music Oxford Camerata [Naxos 8.553130]

Weelkes — Anthems Oxford Camerata [Naxos 8.553209]

Schütz — The Christmas Story Oxford Camerata [Naxos 8.553514]

Machaut — Messe de Nostre Dame & Le Voir Dit Oxford Camerata [Naxos 8.553833]

Obrecht — Missa Caput Oxford Camerata [Naxos 8.553210]

Willaert — Missa Christus resurgens Oxford Camerata [Naxos 8.553211]

Piæ Cantiones (1582) Oxford Camerata [Naxos 8.553578]

Duruflé Requiem & Howells Motets Schola Cantorum of Oxford [Manor MLR 0170]

Tomkins — Choral & Organ Music Oxford Camerata [Naxos 8.553794]

Handel — Coronation Anthems & Silete venti Tallis Chamber Choir / Royal Academy Consort [Naxos 8.557003]

John Streeting — Sacred music Choir of Christ Church, Chelsea [Manor MLR 0209]

Gombert — Motets Oxford Camerata [Naxos 8.557732]

Mozart — Requiem Members of BBCSO, LPO, LSO, RPO, GFO etc. [Hyperion DEC FK1]

Tallis — Spem in alium, Missa Salve intemerata Oxford Camerata [Naxos 8.557770]

Tavener — Lament for Jerusalem (Jerusalem version) Choir of London & Orchestra [Naxos 8.557826]

Hildegard — Celestial Harmonies Oxford Camerata [Naxos 8.557983]

Children of our Time (Tippett, Rodrigues, Pott, Byrchmore, O’Neill, Pitts) Schola Cantorum of Oxford [Hyperion CDA 67575]

Schumann — Partsongs Oxford Camerata / Graham Johnson [Hyperion CDJ 33110]

== Publications ==
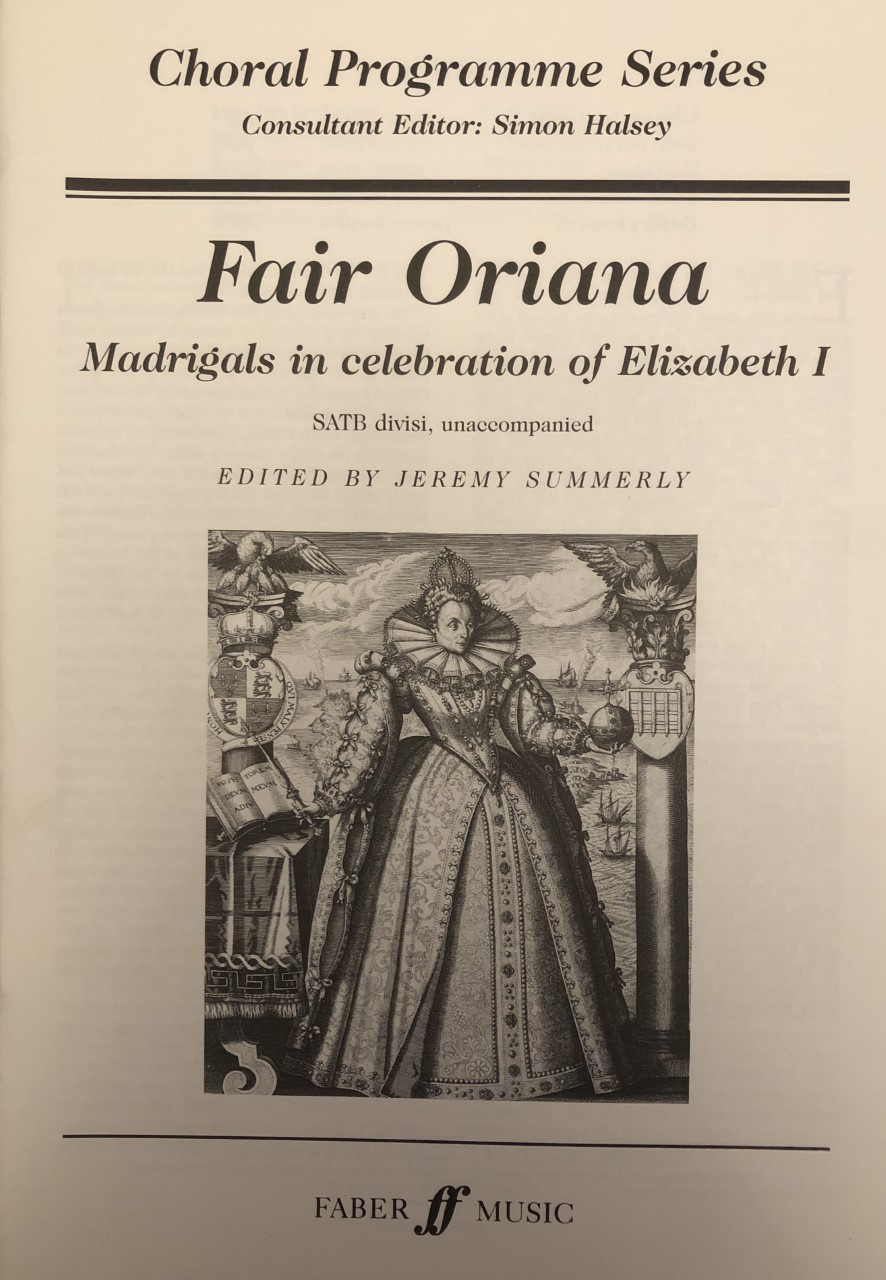
Fair Oriana, edited by Jeremy Summerly

Gaudete – Medieval Songs and Carols (Faber Music, 1999)

Passetime with Good Company – Medieval Songs and Carols (Faber Music, 2000)

Fair Oriana – Madrigals in Celebration of Elizabeth I (Faber Music, 2002)

Thomas Tallis – English Sacred Music (Faber Music, 2004)

Vocal Performance before c.1430’ Cambridge History of Musical Performance (CUP, 2013)

'Choir' Cambridge Encyclopedia of Historical Performance in Music (CUP, 2018)

'Guido d'Arezzo' Cambridge Encyclopedia of Historical Performance in Music (CUP, 2018)
