= Schola Cantorum of Oxford =

Schola Cantorum of Oxford is the longest running chamber choir of University of Oxford, and one of the longest established and most widely known chamber choirs in the United Kingdom. The conductor is Steven Grahl.

The choir was founded in 1960 by the British-Hungarian conductor László Heltay as the Collegium Musicum Oxoniense before adopting the name Schola Cantorum of Oxford in 1964. The choir has been conducted by a long line of eminent conductors including Andrew Parrott, Nicholas Cleobury, Ivor Bolton, Jeremy Summerly and James Burton.

Schola Cantorum has worked with many respected musicians, including former patrons Sir Michael Tippett and Yehudi Menuhin, as well as Leonard Bernstein, Gustav Leonhardt, Sir Colin Davis and Sir Neville Marriner. Current patrons of the choir include Dame Emma Kirkby (a former member), John Mark Ainsley and the choir’s former conductor Andrew Parrott. Other distinguished former members include Ian Bostridge and Jane Glover.

Schola Cantorum comprises around thirty singers, most of whom sing with the choir while they are students at Oxford University. Studying a wide range of academic subjects, including music, the choir members rehearse during university term-times, perform regularly in Oxford and give concerts all over the UK. The choir has a long recording history, most recently of choral works by the Finnish composer Einojuhani Rautavaara. The choir has developed a formidable international reputation and in recent years has given concert tours of Mexico, Argentina, Italy, Israel and Spain. In 2007 it became the first choir from a British university to tour in China, giving concerts in the Forbidden City Concert Hall in Beijing and the new Oriental Art Center in Shanghai. The following year it appeared as guest artists at the 43rd International Festival Wratislavia Cantans in Wroclaw, Poland.

In 2010, Schola celebrated its 50th anniversary season with a concert tour of the UK, culminating in a gala concert in the Sheldonian Theatre in Oxford with the Orchestra of the Age of Enlightenment. The programme included the world première of a specially commissioned work by James MacMillan and the choir welcomed back all of the former conductors of the choir and many former members, including Dame Emma Kirkby, and Christine Rice.
