= List of compositions by Henri Dutilleux =

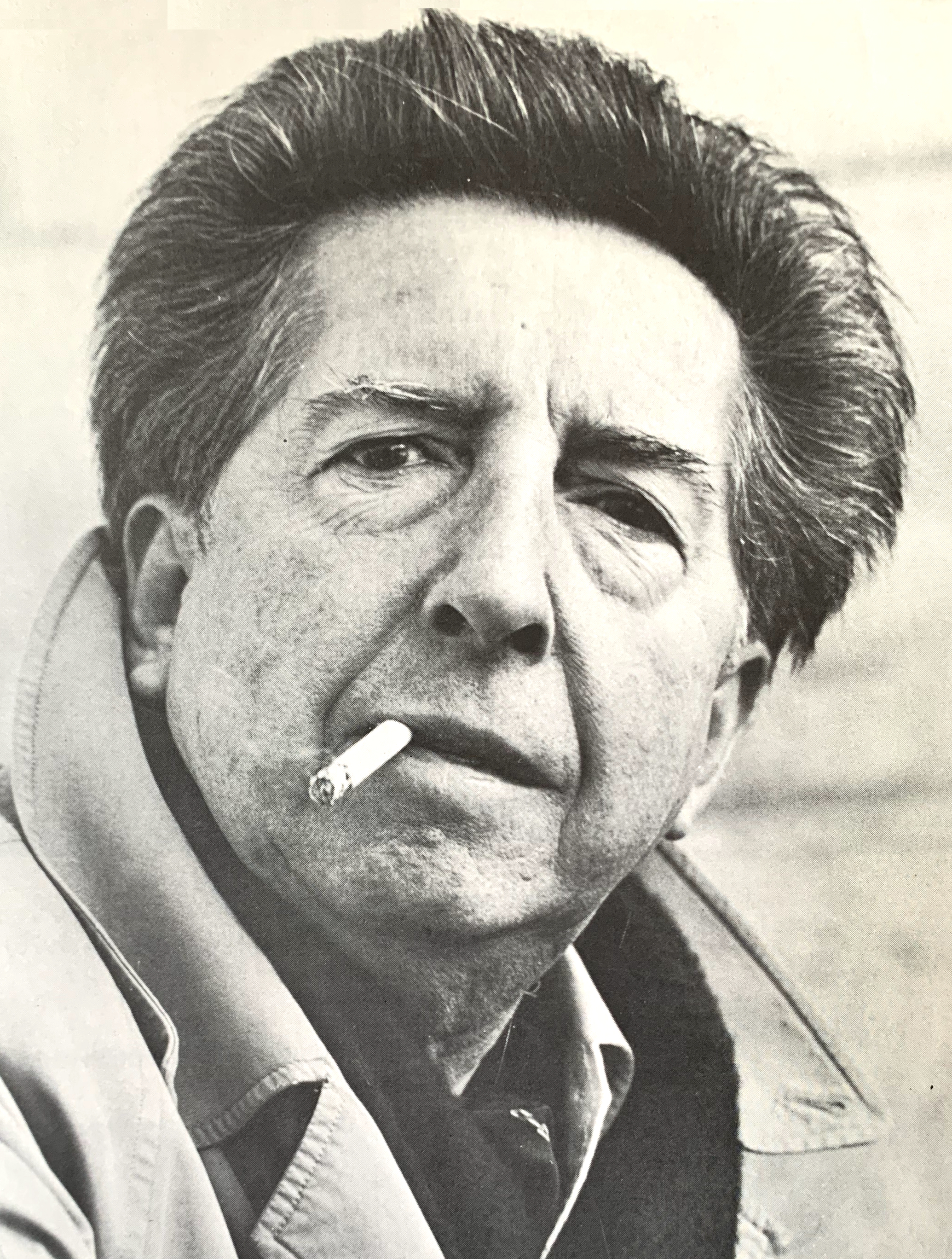
Henri Dutilleux in 2004

Henri Dutilleux (1916–2013) was among the leading French composers of his time. His output was particularly small and he disowned many of the compositions he wrote before his Piano Sonata (1948). They are listed separately under Early works.

== List of compositions ==
=== Orchestral ===
- Symphony No. 1 (1951)
- Sérénades (1956; his contribution to Variations sur le nom de Marguerite Long)
- Symphony No. 2 Le Double (1959)
- Métaboles (1964)
- Timbres, espace, mouvement (1978)
- Mystère de l'instant (1989)
- The Shadows of Time, for three children's voices and orchestra (1997)
- Slava's Fanfare for spatial ensemble (1997)

=== Concertante ===
- Cello Concerto – Tout un monde lointain… [A whole distant world] (1970)
- Violin Concerto – L'Arbre des songes [The Tree of Dreams] (1985)
- Nocturne for violin and orchestra Sur le même accord [On just one chord] (2002)

=== Chamber/instrumental ===
- String Quartet – Ainsi la nuit [Thus the night] (1976)
- Trois Strophes sur le nom de Sacher [Three stanzas on the name Sacher] for solo cello (1976–1982)
- Les citations for oboe, harpsichord, double bass and percussion (1985/1991/2010)
- Regards sur l'Infini and Deux sonnets de Jean Cassou for bassoon and piano (1943/2011 and 1954/2011 – transcription of the vocal works)

=== Piano ===
- Tous les chemins... mènent à Rome [All roads lead to Rome] (1947)
- Bergerie (1947)
- Piano Sonata (1947–48):

1. Allegro con moto
2. Lied
3. III Choral et variations

- Blackbird (1950)
- Résonances (1965)
- Figures de résonances (1970) for two pianos
- Trois Préludes (1973–1988):
  - D'ombre et de silence [In shadow and silence] (1973)
  - Sur un même accord [On one chord] (1977)
  - Le jeu des contraires [The game of opposites] (1988)
- Petit air à dormir debout [Little nonsensical air] (1981)

=== Vocal ===
- Chansons de bord, for three children's voices (1952)
- Deux sonnets de Jean Cassou, for baritone and piano or baritone and orchestra (1954)
- Troix sonnets de Jean Cassou, for baritone and orchestra (1954)
- San Francisco Night, for voice and piano (1963)
- Hommage à Nadia Boulanger, for soprano, 3 violas, clarinet, percussion and zither (1967)
- Correspondances, for soprano and orchestra (2003)
- Le temps l'horloge, for soprano and orchestra (2007–2009)

=== Ballet ===
- Le loup (1953)

=== Film scores ===
- La Fille du diable, by Henri Decoin (1946)
- Six Hours to Lose, by Alex Joffé and Jean Lévitte (1947)
- Le Café du Cadran, by Jean Gehret (1947)
- Le Crime des justes, by Jean Gehret (1950)
- L'Amour d'une femme, by Jean Grémillon (1953)
- Under the Sun of Satan, by Maurice Pialat (1987)

=== Arrangements ===
- Choral, cadence et fugato for trombone and symphonic band (1995 – same as the chamber work, orchestrated by Claude Pichaureau)
- Au gré des ondes, 6 petites pièces pour orchestre (2014 – orchestrated by Kenneth Hesketh, published by Leduc)
- San Francisco Night, for voice and orchestra (2014 – orchestrated by Kenneth Hesketh, published by Leduc)
- Blackbird (1950) scored for Les Citations (instrumentation: oboe, harpsichord, percussion, double bass) by Kenneth Hesketh(2014, published by Billaudot)
- Mini-prélude en éventail (1987) scored for Les Citations (instrumentation: oboe, harpsichord, percussion, double bass) by Kenneth Hesketh (2016, unpublished)
- Sonate pour hautbois for oboe and orchestra (2019 – orchestrated by Kenneth Hesketh, published by Leduc)
- Sonatine pour flûte for flute and orchestra (2019 – orchestrated by Kenneth Hesketh, published by Leduc)
- Sarabande et cortège for basson for bassoon and orchestra (2019 – orchestrated by Kenneth Hesketh, published by Leduc)
- Choral, cadence et fugato for trombone for trombone and orchestra (2022 – orchestrated by Kenneth Hesketh, published by Leduc)

== Early works ==
Dutilleux disowned most of the music he wrote before his Piano Sonata of 1948. Some of them are nonetheless played and recorded regularly, in particular the Sonatine for Flute and Piano.

=== Orchestral ===
- Trois tableaux symphoniques (1943–1945)

=== Chamber/instrumental ===
- Four Exam Pieces for the Paris Conservatoire (1942–1950)
  - Sarabande et cortège for bassoon and piano (1942)
  - Sonatine for Flute and Piano (1943)
  - Oboe Sonata (1947)
  - Choral, cadence et fugato for trombone and piano (1950)

=== Vocal ===
- Barque d'or [The Golden Boat] for soprano and piano (1937)
- Cantata L'anneau du roi [The King's Ring] (1938)
- Quatre mélodies [Four Melodies] for voice and piano (1943)
- La Geôle [The Prison] for voice and orchestra (1944)
- Chanson de la déportée [Song of the Deportee] for voice and piano (1945)

=== Piano ===
- Au gré des ondes, 6 petites pièces pour piano (1946) [Along the waves]:

1. Prélude en berceuse
2. Claquettes
3. Improvisation
4. Mouvement perpétuel
5. Hommage à Bach
6. Étude
