= Poèmes =

Studio album by Renée Fleming
- Released: 6 March 2012
- Genre: French art songs
- Label: Decca Records

Renée Fleming chronology
Dark Hope (2010)	Poèmes (2012)	Guilty Pleasures (2013)

Professional ratings
Review scores
Source	Rating
AllMusic	4.5/5 stars
BBC Music	(Favorable)
The Guardian	4/5 stars
The Independent	4/5 stars

Poèmes is a 2012 album of French songs sung by operatic soprano Renée Fleming. Ravel's Shéhérazade (1903) and Messiaen's Poèmes pour Mi (1936) are followed by two sets of songs by Henri Dutilleux. He transcribed Deux sonnets de Jean Cassou for Fleming (it was originally for baritone voice) and composed Le temps l'horloge specifically for Fleming. The album won the 2013 Grammy Award for Best Classical Solo Vocal Album.

== Track listing ==
1. Ravel Shéhérazade: I. "Asie" 11:02
2. Shéhérazade: II. "La Flûte enchantée" 3:32
3. Shéhérazade: III. "L'Indifférent" 4:14
4. Messiaen: Poèmes pour Mi: I. "Action de grâces" 5:58
5. Poèmes pour Mi: II. "Paysage" 2:00
6. Poèmes pour Mi: III. "La Maison" 1:55
7. Poèmes pour Mi: IV. "Epouvante" 2:53
8. Poèmes pour Mi: V. "L'Épouse" 3:00
9. Poèmes pour Mi: VI. "Ta voix" 3:15
10. Poèmes pour Mi: VII. "Les Deux Guerriers" 1:40
11. Poèmes pour Mi: VIII. "Le Collier" 4:21
12. Poèmes pour Mi: IX. "Prière exaucée" 3:11
13. Henri Dutilleux Deux sonnets de Jean Cassou: I. "II n'y avait que des troncs déchirés" 2:19
14. Deux sonnets de Jean Cassou: II. "J'ai rêvé que je vous portais entre mes bras" 5:30
15. Dutilleux Le temps l'horloge: "Le temps l'horloge" 1:43
16. Le temps l'horloge: "Le Masque" 4:25
17. Le temps l'horloge: "Le Dernier poème" 2:06
18. Le temps l'horloge: "Interlude" 1:20
19. Le temps l'horloge: "Enivrez-vous" 4:39

The Orchestre national de France, conducted by Seiji Ozawa, accompanied Le temps l'horloge. Alan Gilbert conducted the Orchestre philharmonique de Radio France on all other tracks.
