= Sulem =

Sulem is a surname. Notable people with the surname include:

- Agnès Sulem (born 1959), French mathematician
- Agnès Sulem-Bialobroda, violinist for the Rosamonde Quartet
- Catherine Sulem (born 1957), Canadian mathematician and violinist
- Jean Sulem (born 1959), French violist

== See also ==
- Sulem Sarai, town in India
- Sulem Lake, in Minnesota, US
