= Katrien Baerts =

Belgian opera singer

Katrien Baerts (born 29 December 1982, [Hasselt]) is a Belgian soprano.

== Education ==
Baerts obtained a master's degree in violin and voice at the Royal Conservatory of Brussels, after which she joined the Dutch National Opera Academy. Here she performed roles as Amore and Valletto in l'Incoronazione di Poppea, Despina in Così fan tutte, Miss Wordsworth in Albert Herring and Annio in La clemenza di Tito. Together with her pianist Bart Verheyen she followed the 'International Lied Masterclasses' by Udo Reinemann and guest teachers. In 2011 she reached the semi-finals of the Queen Elisabeth competition for voice

== Opera ==
Baerts has performed at the Salzburger Festspiele as Sie in 'Begehren' by Beat Furrer, in Tokio in House of the Sleeping Beauties by Kris Defoort and in Jakarta as the leading role in Gandari by Tony Prabowo. Together with the Instant Composers Pool she played the role of Queen Bee in the opera Cows (Koeien) by Mischa Mengelberg with actors Pierre Bokma and Olga Zuiderhoek, amongst others at the Holland Festival. At the Theatre des Champs-Elysées, Konzerthaus Dortmund and De Doelen in Rotterdam Baerts performed the role of Falke, Hüter der Schwelle and Erste Dienerin in a very well received production of Die Frau ohne Schatten with the Rotterdam Philharmonic Orchestra. In 2019 Baerts performed the role of Koloratursopranistin Efa in the mass production of Aus Licht by Pierre Audi with music by Stockhausen, by which she made her conducting debut at Holland Festival.

Furthermore Baerts has performed the roles of Pamina in die Zauberflöte, Amina in La Sonnambula and Michaela in Carmen.

== Concert ==
Baerts has performed Le temps l'horloge by Dutilleux in Flagey with the Brussels Philharmonic Orchestra conducted by Stéphane Denève. Furthermore she has performed with Klangforum Wien, BBC Philharmonic, Birmingham Contemporary Music Group, Chamber Orchestra of Europe, WDR Symphony Orchestra Cologne, Nederlands Chamber Orchestra, Residentie Orchestra, Radio Filharmonisch Orkest and the Asko|Schönberg Ensemble.

== New music ==
Baerts is mostly known for her contemporary music performances. In 2010 she performed the title role in Robert Zuidams' Suster Bertken at the NTR ZaterdagMatinee at the Concertgebouw in Amsterdam. She also collaborated with Reinbert de Leeuw. Besides Suster Bertken she performed the Five poems for Anna Anna Achmatova op. 41 by György Kurtág, the Requiem by Robert Zuidam, the Seven early songs by Alban Berg, the Maeterlinck Lieder by Aleksander Zemlinsky and the Mysteries of the Macabre by György Ligeti with de Leeuw. Her debut at the Barbican Center in London with music by Sir Harrison Birtwistle conducted by Oliver Knussen was positively received by the press.

She shared the stage with conductors as Richard Egarr, Antony Hermus, Vladimir Jurowski, Yannick Nézet-Séguin, Oliver Knussen, Reinbert de Leeuw, Emilio Pomárico, Otto Tausk and Bas Wiegers.

== Discography ==
- The rise of Spinoza (Theo Loevendie) bij Attacca 2018
- Berg - Zemlinsky Lieder bij Zig-zag Territoires 2014
- Bosch Requiem DVD
- McGonagall-Lieder (Rob Zuidam) bij Challenge Records 2013
- Suster Bertken (Rob Zuidam) bij Attacca 2011
