= L'arbre des songes =

1985 violin concerto written by Henri Dutilleux

L'Arbre des songes
- Violin concerto by Henri Dutilleux
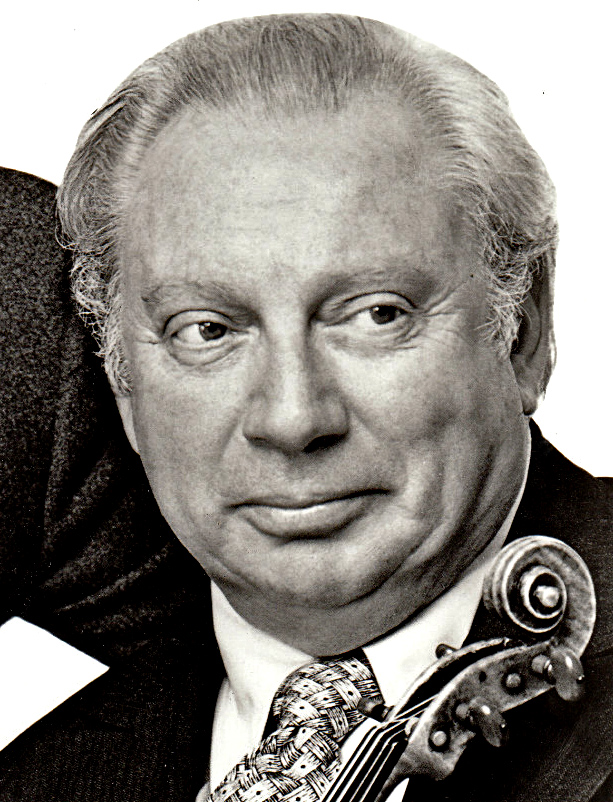
- Violinist Isaac Stern in 1980
- Composed: 1983–1985
- Dedication: Isaac Stern
- Performed: 5 November 1985

L'Arbre des songes (The Tree of Dreams) is a violin concerto written by Henri Dutilleux between 1983 and 1985. It is dedicated to Isaac Stern.

This concerto is the result of the composer's efforts in unifying large-scale works. The process of unification appears on two interrelated levels: form and thematic development.

According to the composer, it is based on a process of continual growth and renewal (hence the title): "All in all the piece grows somewhat like a tree, for the constant multiplication and renewal of its branches is the lyrical essence of the tree. This symbolic image, as well as the notion of a seasonal cycle, inspired my choice of 'L'Arbre des songes' as the title of the piece."

== Composition ==
The concerto was commissioned by Radio France for Isaac Stern to whom it is dedicated. Stern played the concerto at the premiere on November 5, 1985, at the Théâtre des Champs-Élysées, with the Orchestre National de France conducted by Lorin Maazel.

== Instrumentation ==
The concerto is scored for piccolo, two flutes, three oboes (third doubling oboe d'amore), piccolo clarinet in E-flat, two clarinets in A, bass clarinet, two bassoons, contrabassoon, three horns, three trumpets in C (with normal and Robinson mutes), three trombones (with normal and Robinson mutes), tuba, five timpani, two suspended cymbals (high and medium), two tam-tams (medium and low), crotales, tubular bells, glockenspiel, vibraphone, three bongos, three tom-toms, snare drum, cymbalum, piano, celesta, harp, solo violin, sixteen first violins, fourteen second violins, twelve violas, ten cellos and eight double basses.

== Form ==
As in other of his works, notably the cello concerto Tout un monde lointain... and the string quartet Ainsi la nuit, Dutilleux uses an unusual structure of several movements (four in this case) without any break between each movements. He develops this continuity here with three interludes linking the movements, each in a very different style.

1. Librement
  Interlude
2. Vif
  Interlude 2
3. Lent
  Interlude 3
4. Large et animé

A typical performance runs approximately 25 to 30 minutes.

== Discography ==
- Isaac Stern (violin), Orchestre National de France, Lorin Maazel (cond.). Recorded November 6–7, 1985 (Paris). Columbia Records.
- Pierre Amoyal (violin), Orchestre National de France, Charles Dutoit (cond.). Recorded 1995. Decca Records.
- Olivier Charlier (violin), BBC Philharmonic, Yan Pascal Tortelier (cond.). Recorded March 26–27, 1996. Chandos Records.
- Isabelle van Keulen (violin), Bamberger Symphoniker, Marc Soustrot (cond.). Recorded 1998. Koch Schwann Records.
- Renaud Capuçon (violin), Orchestre philharmonique de Radio France, Myung-Whun Chung (cond.). Recorded February 8–11, 2001 (Paris). EMI Records/Virgin Classics.
- Olivier Charlier (violin), Orchestre National Bordeaux Aquitaine, Hans Graf (cond). Recorded 2005. Arte Nova Classics.
- Dmitry Sitkovetsky (violin), Amsterdam Concertgebouw Orchestra, Mariss Jansons (cond.). Recorded June 7–8, 2007. RCO Live.
- Augustin Hadelich (violin), Seattle Symphony Orchestra, Ludovic Morlot (cond.). Recorded November 4 and 7, 2014. Seattle Symphony Media. Won the 2015 Grammy award for Best Classical Instrumental Solo.
