= François Sarhan =

French composer, artist and writer

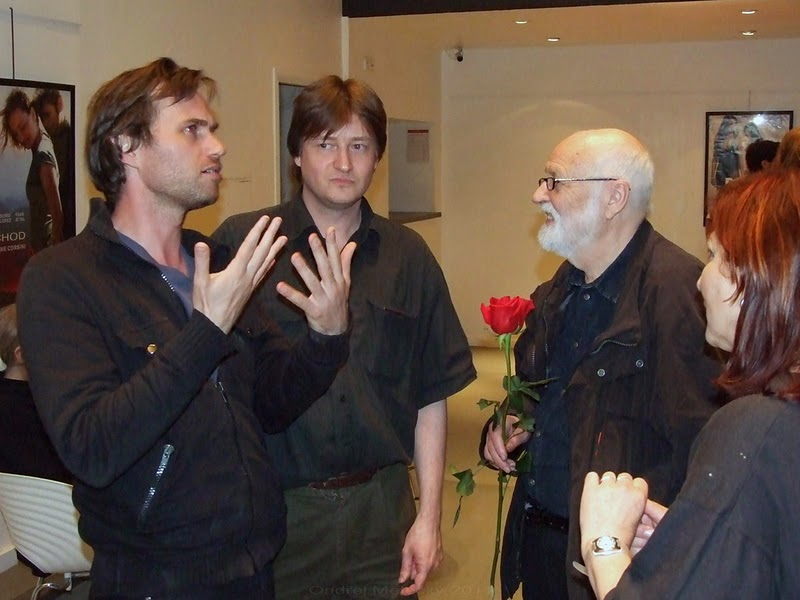
- Born: 30 September 1972 (age 53); Rouen, France

François Sarhan (born 30 September 1972) is a French composer, installation artist, visual artist and writer.

== Biography ==
Born in Rouen, Sarhan studied composition with Guy Reibel, Philippe Manoury, Brian Ferneyhough at the Conservatoire de Paris from 1996 to 2000. Sarhan is known for his mixed and ambiguous works, which cross the accepted artforms, often confronting stop-motion animation, performance, text that he realizes himself. He has achieved international recognition over recent years, thanks to his collaboration with William Kentridge, and his solo shows like Lâchez Tout!. His works have performed and broadcast in more than 20 countries and he has received commissions from, among others, Percussions de Strasbourg, Ensemble Modern, Ensemble Recherche, Donaueschinger Musiktage, Ensemble Intercontemporain, and The Orchestre Philharmonique de Radio-France.

His output ranges from instrumental music, which typically employs the voice of the performer and electronic elements, to video installations, movies and shows, like The Last Lighthouse Keepers (2013). Other works of particular note include l'Nfer (2005–2006), written a narrator and 8 musicians, based on an autobiographic narrative written by Sarhan; the Encyclopaedia (2008–2014), a multimedia and long-term project which aims to build an alternative scientific description of the world, via collages, stop motion animation, music and books.

He was the resident composer at Arsenal concert hall, Metz, (2005–2006), in Orléans (2008–2011).

Since 2024 he teaches in the Anton Bruckner University, Linz. He currently lives in VIenna.

== Awards and honours ==
Sarhan refuses all awards and honours, because "music and art has nothing to do with this monkey business"

== Compositions ==
- Analogies, music theatre show, for ensemble Zafraan, 2025 (60')
- Les Murs meurent aussi, music theatre show, for ensemble Lucilin, with Daniel Agi, Julia Lwolwski, Maria Buzhor, 2024 (120')
- The Right Ear, music theatre show, for six musicians, with video, 2020 (60')
- Situations, 35 pieces for 1 to 4 performers, 2008–2020
- Log Book, electroacoustic, 2019- (120')
- The end of the story, for 2 musicians and video, 2019 (13')
- Nacht bis Acht, music theatre for children, 2019 (50')
- Potence à Paratonnerre, for 12 musicians, 2017 (40')
- One Shot Train, music theatre show, for 5 musicians, 2017 (90')
- Fingers and MOuth, for keyboard and video, 2015 (12')
- Talea 3, for five musicians, 2017, for five musicians (17')
- Commodity Music, music theatre show, for four electric guitars and 24 loudspeakers, 2016 (60')
- La Philosophie dans le Boudoir, music theatre show, for six voices, 2015 (60')
- Talea 2, for 11 musicians and electronics, 2015 (60')
- Wandering Rocks, for four electric guitars and 24 loudspeakers, 2014 (40')
- Zentral Park, for 8 musicians and electronics, 2014 (30')
- The Last Lighthouse Keepers, music theatre show, for 4 performers and electronics, 2013 (40')
- Lâchez Tout!, music theatre show, including a feature movie, 5 musicians, 2013–2014 (70')
- Encyclopaedia, 2008–2014, music theatre, multimedia, various lengths and formats
- Homework, for six musicians, 2009 (60')
- The Name of the song, for 7 musicians, 2007 (13')
- L'Nfer, for 8 musicians, 2005–2006 (65')
- Nuit sans Date, for mezzo and electronics, text by Jacques Roubaud 2001 (7')
- Such is Life, for four solo voices, text by Edward Lear 2000 (6')

== Collaborations ==
- J Svankmajer's magnetic Fields, music theatre show, based on 4 Jan Svankmajer's short movies, 2013 (65')
- A King Lear, chamber opera, libretto by Jacques Roubaud, 2010 (90')
- Telegrams from the Nose, music theatre show, with William Kentridge (video and staging) for 5 musicians, 2008-2020 (60')
- Set, music for dance, with François Raffinot (dance, video and staging) for tape, 2006 (60')
- Kyrielle du Sentiment des Choses, chamber opera, libretto by Jacques Roubaud 2002 (65')

== Video works ==
- Der Koffer (the Suitcase) featured film (2017–2019)
- Prague, short (25mn), 2019
- Lâchez tout, featured film, 2013
- Corps aveugle, short (2012)
- La vie des bêtes, animal mockumentary (2011)
- l'Orgue Accord, stop motion animation (2008)
- Interludio Erotico, stop motion animation (2008)
- Joséphine, stop motion animation (2008)

== Installations ==
- La Musique au chateau de Chambord, (2014)
- Wandering Rocks, for four electric guitars and 24 loudspeakers, 2014 (40')
- Glaçon in Oslo (2011)
- Le Grand Crwth, (2002)

== Discography ==
- François Sarhan: Wandering Rocks – performed by Zwerm guitar quartet. Lamuse Records, 2014
- François Sarhan: Pop Up – l'Nfer and Orloff performed by Ictus Ensemble. Sismal Records, 2012
- François Sarhan: Hell (a small detail) – pieces performed by ensemble Sic, the Rosamonde Quartet. Zig Zag Records, 2013

== External links / references ==
- Official website
- filmed interview
