= Piano Sonata (Dutilleux) =

- by Henri Dutilleux
- Dedication: Geneviève Joy
- Performed: 30 April 1948
- Movements: three

Henri Dutilleux's Piano Sonata (1947–1948) was his only piano sonata. It is dedicated to and was premiered by his wife Geneviève Joy on 30 April 1948. The Piano Sonata has since become one of the most acclaimed post-World War II works in the genre and has been championed by major pianists such as John Ogdon, Robert Levin, John Chen and Claire-Marie Le Guay.

Although Dutilleux had been active as a composer for ten years when he wrote his piano sonata, he viewed it as his Opus 1, the first work that he considered up to his mature standards. Debussy, Ravel, Bartók and Prokofiev have been cited as influences on the piece although critics have also stressed that its language is original and distinctive, a personal synthesis of French Impressionism and Soviet music.

== Music ==
The work has three movements.

1. Allegro con moto
2. Lied
3. Choral et variations

The piano sonata represented an opportunity for Dutilleux to experiment with an ambitious, large-scale project, something that his previous commissioned works did not permit. In his own words: "I wanted to move gradually towards working in larger forms, and not to be satisfied with short pieces – to get away, if you like, from a way of writing that was 'typically French'". The piece combines two concerns typical of Dutilleux's mature works: formal rigour and harmonic research. Its themes are ambiguous, never completely modal or tonal.

The first movement, Allegro con moto, starts in 2/2 but often changes meter. It is bi-thematic and classical in structure, with an ample first theme while the second one derives from the former. From the very first bars, it displays F♯ major-minor ambiguity. Tritones are also featured prominently, as well as extremes of register which give the piece a symphonic character.

The Lied is the shortest movement. In ternary A–B–A form, it is also sparser and more pensive than the other two. Its basic tonality is D♭ major although some degree of modal-tonal ambiguity is again noticeable. It begins in 4/8 with some meter changes later on.

The last movement starts with an imposing Choral in 3/2 that suggests a four-voice polyphony. It is characterized by carillon-like sonorities that are created by the overlapping of low and high sustained notes. It is followed by 4 variations (Vivace – Un poco più vivo – Calmo – Prestissimo). Variation II features an early example of "fan-shaped phrases", a device Dutilleux would use frequently in his later works. The movement concludes with a varied recapitulation of the Choral. The variations are thus structured in a mini-sonata form, creating a "sonata within a sonata". Throughout the movement, several passages have a toccata-like character.

The work has been described as "a brilliant, multi-layered piece with echoes of Bartók and Prokofiev" as well as a "sonata that Debussy might have written... sensuous and classical".

== Selected discography ==
- 1995 – Marie-Josèphe Jude (CD – Harmonia Mundi #911569)
- 2000 – Claire-Marie Le Guay (CD – Accord #465772)
- 2000 – Anne Queffélec (CD – Virgin #45222)
- 2007 – John Chen (CD – Naxos #8557823)
- 2010 – Robert Levin (CD – ECM #2105)
- 2012 – John Ogdon, recorded in 1972 (CD – Warner Classics #4637)
- 2013 – Geneviève Joy, recorded in 1988 (CD – Erato #42755)
- 2015 – Kathryn Stott (CD – BIS #2148)
- 2020 – Élodie Vignon (CD – Cypres #4658)
