= Rosamonde Quartet =

French string quartet

The Rosamonde Quartet is a French string quartet ensemble established in 1981. It takes its name from Rosamunde, a 1823 composition of incidental music by Franz Schubert, from which he reused a theme in his 13th quartet, nicknamed Rosamunde Quartet.

== History and musical activity ==
The Rosamonde Quartet was founded in 1981 by four students of Jacques Parrenin and Roland Pidoux at the Conservatoire de Paris: Agnès Sulem-Bialobroda (first violin), Thomas Tercieux (second violin), Jean Sulem (viola) and Xavier Gagnepain (cello). Then the musicians perfected their skills at Yale University. Raphaël Hillyer (1914–2010), violist of the Juilliard String Quartet from 1946 to 1969, stimulated them in this project from the beginning. They have also been taught by Eugene Lehner, violist of the Kolisch Quartet, a friend of Schoenberg and Bartok, who passed on to them the heritage of the Viennese great masters of the early 20th century and the cellist Aldo Parisot as well as the members of the Tokyo Quartet.

First winners of the Menuhin Foundation (1982), the Rosamonde Quartet won the "Concours International d'Évian" in 1983, with the "Prix d'interprétation de compositeurs modernes" (Prize for the Performance of Modern Composers) and the "Prix spécial du Jury international des critiques" (Special Prize of the International Critics' Jury") unanimously, and in 1986 won the First Prize of the International Quartet Competition of the European Broadcasting Union in Salzburg. It has been leading an international career playing an eclectic repertoire which includes contemporary music. It received the Grand Prix du disque de l'Académie Charles Cros in 2005 for its recording devoted to Jacques Lenot's chamber music.

It has premiered works by several composers: Quatuor Bobok by François Sarhan in 2002 Quatuor à cordes n°3 by Renaud Gagneux in 1991, Quatuor l'intranquillité by Michèle Reverdy in 1992 at the Opéra Bastille of Paris, Mémoire de la rivière (first part of La Danse du Temps) by Tôn-Thất Tiết in 1999. It has also worked with several composers and recorded their works: Pascal Dusapin, Philippe Fénelon, Philippe Hersant, György Kurtág, Éric Tanguy, and especially with Henri Dutilleux in whose presence they recorded his Ainsi la nuit quartet and who greatly appreciated their interpretation.

The Rosamonde Quartet is regularly invited to play and give master classes in France and abroad. It regularly performs at the International Festival of String Quartets in Luberon.

Director Vincent Bataillon made three films with the Rosamonde Quartet in 2010–2011:

- Notes for a Quartet focuses on the development of the interpretation around the 4th movement of Beethoven's Quartet No. 14.
- At the heart of the quartet of our time devoted to three works: Debussy's string quartet, Ainsi la nuit by Dutilleux, Ravel's string quartet.
- Henri Dutilleux: Ainsi la nuit, a film that testifies to the collaboration between the composer and the quartet.

== Discography ==
Many recordings of the Rosamonde Quartet have received awards from music magazines. Among these many records (all listed on their official website specified below), are:

- Nuits: Verklärte Nacht by Arnold Schoenberg with Antoine Tamestit, second alto and Jérôme Pernoo, second cello, one quartet by Ligeti, Ainsi la nuit by Dutilleux, label Pierre Verany PV 706021
- Ravel/Fauré: string quartets, label Pierre Verany PV 799052, 1999, ƒƒƒƒ by Télérama
- Debussy/Roussel: string quartets, label Pierre Verany PV 700029, 2001
- Fauré: quintets with Emmanuel Strosser pianist, label Pierre Verany PV 703011, 2003
- Liens, chamber music by Jacques Lenot, Grand prix du disque académie Charles Cros
- Messiaen: Unpublished, Editions Jade 74 321 67 411–2, 1999, ƒƒƒƒ by Télérama
- Kurtag: Tribute to Mihaly Andras, 12 Microludes for string quartets, Musique française d'aujourd'hui, Radio France, MFA 216030 HMCD73
- Dutilleux (Ainsi la nuit), Hersant (quartet No 2), Fénelon (Onze inventions): MFA 581280 AD 184, 1991, ƒƒƒƒ by Télérama
