= Xavier Gagnepain =

French classical cellist (born 1960)

Xavier Gagnepain (born 1960) is a French contemporary classical cellist.

== Biography ==
Gagnepain studied at the Conservatoire de Paris and Yale University in the U.S.A. He gained some fame in international competitions such as those of Munich and São Paulo.

He began a double career as a soloist and chamber musician. He is invited by renowned orchestras of the European scene (the London Symphony Orchestra, the Sofia Radio Orchestra, the Moscow Soloists), plays regularly with the pianist Hortense Cartier-Bresson,"Xavier GAGNEPAIN" (PDF). Archived from the original (PDF) on 2009-01-05. and is the cellist of the Rosamonde Quartet (laureate of the Concours International of Évian in 1983 with the Prix d'interprétation de compositeurs modernes and the Prix spécial du Jury international des critiques and First Prize of the international competition of string quartets of the Union des Radios Européennes in Salzbourg in 1986).

In 1996, Gagnepain was the first to perform in concert the 12 pieces on the name of Paul Sacher, contemporary repertoire for cello solo, famous for its difficulty. His discography includes both concertos and chamber music ranging from duets to sextets.

The Cité de la musique commissioned him a pedagogical work published in 2001 under the title Du musicien en général au violoncelliste en particulier.

Xavier Gagnepain teaches at the Académie internationale d'été de Nice and at the conservatoire à rayonnement régional de Boulogne-Billancourt.
