= Prithwindra Mukherjee =

French-Indian writer and researcher (1936–2024)

- Born: October 20, 1936; Calcutta, Bengal Presidency, British India
- Died: November 30, 2024 (aged 88); Paris, France
- Education: University of Paris (Sorbonne)
- Occupations: Writer, historian, musicologist, translator, academic
- Known for: Research on Bagha Jatin, Indian revolutionary movement, and Indian classical music
- Notable work: The Intellectual Roots of India's Freedom Struggle (1893–1918), Vivekananda: The Soul of India, Bagha Jatin
- Parents: Tejendranath Mukherjee (father); Usharani Mukherjee (mother)
- Relatives: Bagha Jatin (grandfather)
- Awards: Padma Shri (2020), Ordre des Arts et des Lettres, Ordre des Palmes académiques, Hirayama Award (Académie française)

Prithwindra Mukherjee (Bengali: পৃথ্বীন্দ্রনাথ মুখোপাধ্যায়; 20 October 1936 – 30 November 2024) was a French-Indian writer and researcher. Until his retirement in 2003, he was a researcher in the Human and Social Sciences Department (Ethnomusicology) of the French National Centre of Scientific Research in Paris. Mukherjee was also an author of a number of books and other publications on various subjects.

Mukherjee was a recipient of India's highly prestigious award Padma Shri 2020 for his work in the field of literature and education.

== Early life and education ==
Born to Tejendranath and Usharani Mukherjee in Kolkata, India, on 20 October 1936, Mukherjee was educated at the Sri Aurobindo Ashram School (at present, the Sri Aurobindo International Centre of Education) in Pondicherry. He is the grandson of the Bengali revolutionary Jatindranath Mukherjee (Bagha Jatin).

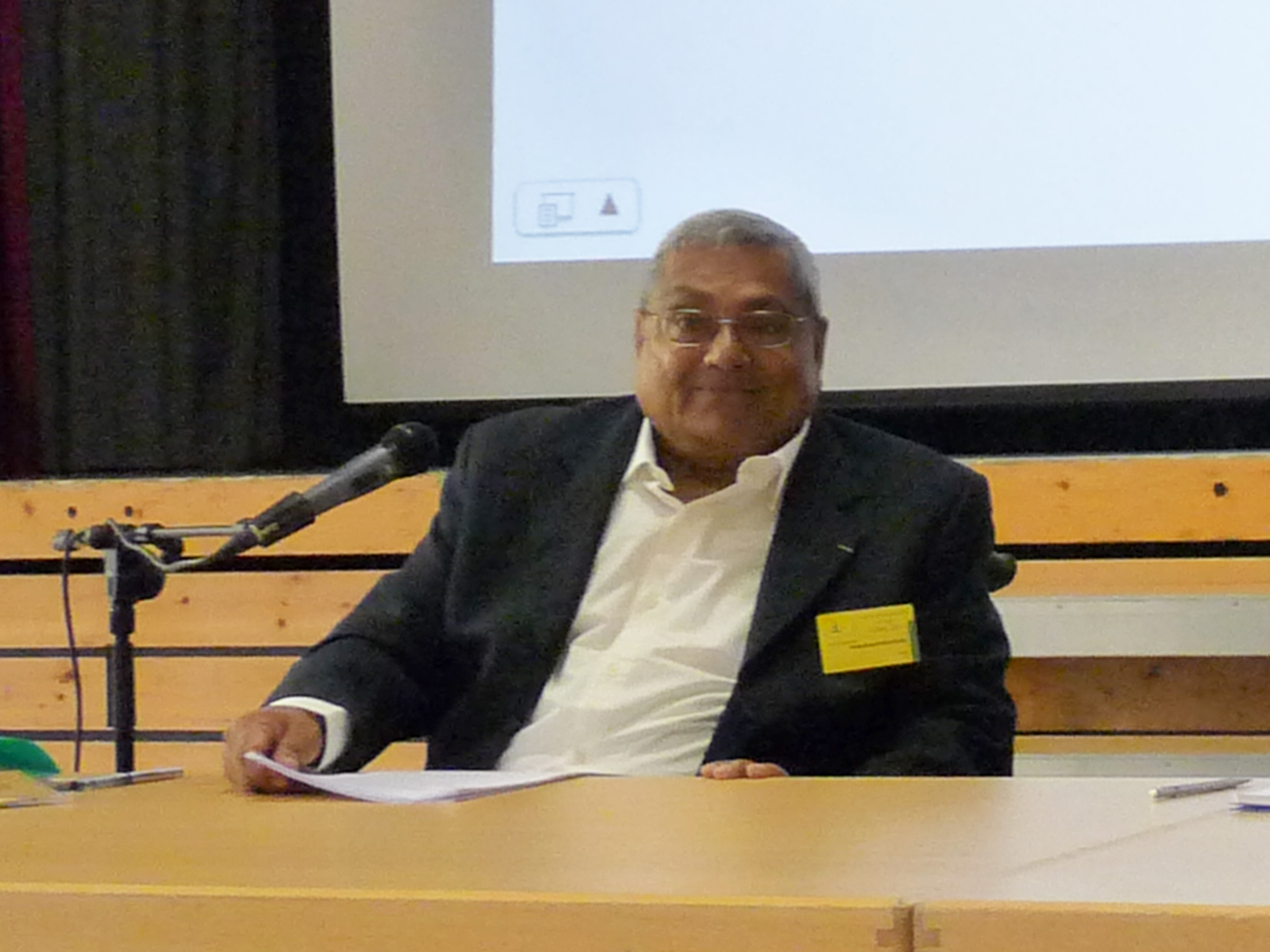
Prithwindra Mukherjee-Zinal 2011

== Professional and academic life ==
Prithwindra began his working life as a teacher of Bengali, French and English languages and literature in Pondicherry. He was mentioned by the Sahitya Akademi (New Delhi) manuals and anthologies as a poet before he attained the age of 20. As a specialist in the French language and literature, he translated works by such French authors as Albert Camus, Saint-John Perse, and René Char.

He moved to Paris with a French Government Scholarship (1966–70). He prepared and defended a thesis on Sri Aurobindo at Sorbonne. Later he served as a lecturer on Indian civilization and philosophy, producer of several radio features on Indian culture and music for Radio France, and he was also freelancing as a journalist for the Indian and French press. His next thesis for Doctorat d'Etat (Ph.D.), was supervised by Raymond Aron in University Paris IV, on the pre-Gandhi a phase of India's freedom fight. His thesis discussed this movement from 1893 to 1918 and its spiritual roots.

In 1977, invited by the National Archives of India as a guest of the Historical Records Commission, he presented a paper on Jatindra Nath Mukherjee and the Indo-German Conspiracy in the presence of personalities like Arthur L. Basham and Professor S. Nurul Hasan. Prithwindra's original contribution in this area has been recognized by Professor Amales Tripathi, Bhupendrakumar Datta, Dr. Jadugopal Mukhopadhyay, Dr. M.N. Das (Utkal University),¨Professor A.C. Bose, Samaren Roy, Bhupati Majumdar, Basudha Chakravarty. Quite a few of his papers on the subject have been translated into major Indian languages.

== Life after reaching France ==
Since his reaching Paris, for a number of years, invited by the literary magazine Desh of Calcutta he published his impressions of Paris life (Paris'ér chithi – Letters from Paris), as well as several cover features including Jatin Mukherjee alias Bagha Jatin, M.N. Roy, Tarak Nath Das, Dhan Gopal Mukerji, French Revolutionary and the Bengali intelligentsia and the poetry-cum-dance genre of the kîrtana (on which he has also produced a documentary film).

He went to the USA as a Fulbright scholar and discovered, especially in the Wilson Papers, scores of files covering the Indian revolutionaries. On returning to France in 1981, he joined the French National Centre of Scientific Research in 1981. He was also a founder-member of the French Literary Translators' Association . He retired from there a few years back. He has published as much in Bengali as in French. One of his recent contributions is a documentary film on the musical pillars in the temples of South India (CNRS-Audiovisual, Paris).

Since 1981, Prithwindra Mukherjee joined the LACITO of the CNRS (Department of Ethnomusicology) working on a comprehensive cognitive study of scales of North and South Indian music.

The eminent author Jacques Attali in his French biography of Gandhi (Fayard, 2007) mentions his debt to PM for having revised the manuscripts and collaborated actively. Later, Mr. Attali has qualified Prithwindra Mukherjee as "the man of Franco-Indian Renaissance".

On 1 January 2009, the Minister of Culture of France has appointed Prithwindra Mukherjee to the rank of chevalier (Knight) of the Order of Arts and Letters. The French Academy (Belles Lettres) selected Prithwindra Mukherjee for its Hirayama Award (Prix Hirayama) 2014. On 1 January 2015, the French Prime Minister, requested by the Minister of Education, has appointed Prithwindra Mukherjee to the rank of chevalier (Knight) of the order of Palmes académiques (Academic Laurels).

Mukherjee died on 30 November 2024, at the age of 88.

== Selected bibliography ==
- Danse cosmique – (trilingual collection of selected poems, published on the occasion of the creation of Correspondances for soprano and orchestra (Dawn Upshaw with the Berliner Philharmoniker, conducted by Sir Simon Rattle) by the senior French composer Henri Dutilleux: it contains as the first movement PM's 'Danse cosmique', in homage to Shiva Nataraja; foreword by Jean Biès, éd. Le Décaèdre/ Findakly, 2003
- Sri Aurobindo, 'Biographies', Desclée de Brouwer, 2000
- Nandî le Fou et autres nouvelles de Banaphul. Selection of texts, translation, introduction and notes. Gallimard, 1994.
- Anthologie de la poésie bengalie, choix de textes, traduction, introduction et notes, 1991. 301p. Repr. in pocket book, 1992, L'Harmattan.
- Les écrits bengalis de Sri Aurobindo. Foreword by Olivier LACOMBE of the French Academy. Dervy-Livres, 1986.
- Chants bâuls, les Fous de l'Absolu, selection of texts, translation in French and English, introduction, notes on esoteric symbols. éd. Findakly/ Ministry of Culture, 1985.
- Maître Camkara, discours sur le bouddhisme, éd. Trédaniel, 1985
- Le sâmkhya, essai philosophique. Foreword by Professor Guy BUGAULT (University Paris IV). Epi/DDB, 1983.
- Serpent de flammes, poèmes. Foreword G. MOURGUE. éd. Estienne, 1981
- Chants Caryâ, a collection of Bengali sahaj-yâna texts, with introduction and notes, Le Calligraphe, Paris, 1981
- Poèmes du Bangladesh, a selection of poems, Publications Orientalistes de France, Paris, 1975 (with LP containing some poems recited by Madeleine Renaud, Jean-Louis Barrault and PM)
- Thât/Mélakartâ : The Fundamental Scales in Indian Music of the North and the South, Indira Gandhi National Centre for the Arts, New Delhi, 2004; foreword by Pandit Ravi Shankar
- Prasanga bâul: kichhu durbhâvanâ ('About the Bâuls : Some Questions') in Ebong mushâyérâ, Kolkâtâ
- Sri aurobindo ki samasâmayik ? ('Is Sri Aurobindo our contemporary ?') in Vasudhârâ, Kolkâtâ,
- Sri Aurobindo (biography), Sri Aurobindo Institute of Culture, Kolkâtâ, 2003 [Sri Aurobindo Award]
- Cognitive Prototypes in Râgas of Indian Music .in Proceedings of the XVth International Congress of Linguists, Palais de Congress, 1997, Elsevier Science, Oxford, 1998
- "Rabindranâth Tagore" in Les Prix Nobel de Littérature, éd. L'Alhambra, Paris, 1992, pp. 185–191.
- "Rabindranath Tagore" in Encyclopédie Universalis (several editions since 1982)
- "Rabindranath Tagore" in Dictionnaire des littératures, Presses Universitaires de France, Paris
- Vishvéra chokhé Rabindranath, tributes to the Poet, Rupa & Co, Calcutta, 1991
- Undying Courage : Biography of Jatindranath Mukherjee (one of the founders of the Freedom Movement in India), Academic Publishers, Calcutta, 1992
- Sâdhak biplabi jatîndranâth : a comprehensive biography of Jatindranath Mukherjee, West Bengal Board of Books, Calcutta, 1991
- Bâghâ Jatîn, an abridged biography, Dey's Publishing, Calcutta, 4th Edition.
- Mélakartâ, Mukherjee, Prithwindra (auteur), Préface de Ravi Shankar, Editions Publibook Université, 2010, ISBN 978-2-7483-5235-1
- Les racines intellectuelles du mouvement d'indépendance de l'Inde (1893–1918), Préface de Jacques Attali, Editions Codex, 2010
