= John Chen (pianist) =

New Zealand concert pianist

John Chen (born 10 June 1986, Kuala Lumpur) is a Malaysian-born New Zealand concert pianist.

In 2004 he became the youngest-ever winner of the Sydney International Piano Competition. In his subsequent concert tour of Australia he performed 31 recitals, making it the longest tour ever undertaken by a classical musician in Australia.

He earned the Master of Music degree from the University of Auckland, where he studied with Rae de Lisle.

He has performed with most of the major symphony orchestras of Australia and New Zealand, and has made recordings of Henri Dutilleux and Claude Debussy for Naxos and ABC Classics respectively.

On 2 August 2012, John Chen performed at Chengelo School in Mkushi, Zambia during his visit to the country.
