= Correspondances =

Song-cycle for soprano and orchestra by Henri Dutilleux

- Song cycle by Henri Dutilleux
- Van Gogh's Le café de nuit, the painting that is described in the fifth movement's excerpt of a letter from the painter to his brother
- Text: poems by Rainer Maria Rilke, Prithwindra Mukherjee, and excerpts from the letters of Aleksandr Solzhenitsyn and Vincent van Gogh
- Language: French
- Composed: 2002–03
- Movements: five
- Scoring: soprano; orchestra

Correspondances is a song-cycle for soprano and orchestra written by the French composer Henri Dutilleux in 2002–03.

It consists of five episodes and an interlude. The work was premiered by Simon Rattle and Dawn Upshaw with the Berlin Philharmonic on 5 September 2003 and has since been performed all over the world. It lasts 22 minutes.

== Overview ==
Correspondances consists of five movements based on various letters and poems as well as an interlude. The movements are

1. Gong I (Rilke)
2. Danse cosmique [Cosmic Dance] (Mukherjee)
  Interlude
3. À Slava et Galina... [From Slava and Galina] (Solzhenitsyn)
4. Gong 2 (Rilke)
5. De Vincent à Théo... [From Vincent to Theo] (van Gogh)

The title refers both to letter writing and to synaesthesia in the Baudelairian sense i.e. symbolic "correspondences" between the senses and the world. It is based on texts by Rainer Maria Rilke, Prithwindra Mukherjee, Aleksandr Solzhenitsyn and Vincent van Gogh. Although they come from disparate sources, they are unified by their mystical inspiration and especially their concern about the place of humanity in the Cosmos.

Each episode highlights a particular family of instruments. For instance, woodwinds and brass are prominent in De Vincent à Théo..., echoing the painter's use of colour while an accordion and strings, in particular a cello quartet, dominate in À Slava et Galina (that letter was addressed to legendary cellist Mstislav Rostropovich and his wife, soprano Galina Vishnevskaya). Danse cosmique, opens with timpani and pizzicato strings before the whole orchestra surrounds the singer.

The work contains quotations from Modest Mussorgsky's Boris Godunov as well as Dutilleux's own Timbres, espace, mouvement in Solzhenitsyn's letter and van Gogh's respectively.

It was recorded by Esa-Pekka Salonen and Barbara Hannigan (for whom the composer wrote a new finale) with the Orchestre philharmonique de Radio France in 2013.

== Text ==
=== I. Gong I (Rilke) ===
Timbre
qui n'est plus par l'ouïe mesurable.
Comme si le son qui nous surpasse de toutes parts
Était l'espace qui mûrit.

Timbre
that is no longer for measurable hearing.
As if the sound that surpasses us
Was the space that ripened.

(1999 Les Éditions Verdier, French translation by Jean-Yves Masson)

=== II. Danse cosmique (Mukherjee) ===
Des flammes, des flammes qui envahissent le ciel,
Qui es-tu, ô Danseur, dans l'oubli du monde ?
Tes pas et tes gestes font dénouer tes tresses
Tremblent les planètes et la terre sous tes pieds.

Des flammes, des flammes qui envahissent la terre,
Des flammes de déluge pénétrant tous les cœurs,
Effleurant les ondes de l'océan des nuits
Des foudres se font entendre au rythme des éclairs.

Des flammes, des flammes dans les gouffres souterrains,
Des bourgeons de tournesol ouvrent leurs pétales,
Des squelettes du passé dans la caresse du feu
Engendrent les âmes d'une création nouvelle.

Des flammes, des flammes dans le cœur de l'homme,
Qui es-tu, ô barde céleste, qui chantes l'avenir ?

Flames, the flames that invade the sky,
Who are you, o Dancer, in the oblivion of the world?
Your steps and your motions undo your tresses
As the earth and the planets tremble beneath your feet.

Flames, the flames that invade the earth,
Flames in a deluge penetrating all our hearts,
Teasing the waves in the ocean of nights,
Thunder pealing to the rhythm of lightning.

Flames, the flames in the depths below,
The sunflower buds open their petals,
The skeletons of the past in the caresse of fire
Beget the souls of a new creation.

Flames, the flames in the heart of man,
Who are you, o celestial bard, who sings of the future?

(Prithwindra Mukherjee, Éditions, "Le Décaèdre")

=== III. À Slava et Galina... (Solzhenitsyn) ===
À l'approche du dixième anniversaire de mon exil, des scènes des années terribles et
accablantes reprennent vie devant mes yeux. Alia et moi avons repensé à ces moments :
sans votre protection et votre soutien, jamais je n'aurais pu supporter ces années-là. J'aurais
fait naufrage, car ma vigueur était déjà près de s'éteindre. Je n'avais pas de toit pour
m'abriter : à Riazan, on m'aurait étouffé. Et vous, vous avez protégé ma solitude avec un
tact tel que vous ne m'avez même pas parlé des contraintes et du harcèlement auxquels
vous étiez soumis. Vous avez créé une atmosphère que je n'aurais pas imaginée possible.
Sans elle, j'aurais probablement explosé, incapable de tenir jusqu'en 1974.

Se rappeler tout cela avec gratitude, c'est bien peu dire. Vous l'avez payé bien cruellement,
surtout Galia qui a perdu à jamais son théâtre. Toute ma gratitude ne suffira jamais à
compenser de telles pertes. Tout au plus peut-on retirer une certaine force de la conviction
qu'en ce siècle, nous autres Russes sommes tous voués au même terrible destin de d'espérer
que le Seigneur ne nous punira pas jusqu'au bout.

Merci mes chers amis. Bien à vous pour toujours.

At the approach of the tenth anniversary of my exile, scenes of terrible and
trying years come to life before my eyes. Alia and I thought back to those moments:
without your protection and your support, I never would have been able to go on. I would have
foundered, for my strength had almost already left me. I had no roof over
my head: in Ryazan, I would have been suffocated. And you, you protected my solitude with such grace
that you never even told me about all the restrictions and harassment to which
you were subject. You created an atmosphere that I could not have imagined to be possible.
Without it, I would have gone to pieces, unable to hold out until 1974.

To remember all this graciously is to say little. You paid a cruel price for it,
above all Galya who lost her theater forever. All my gratitude will never
make up for such losses. We can only take a little strength from the conviction
that in this century, we Russians are dedicated to the same terrible destiny of hoping
that the Lord will not punish us until the end.

Thank you, my dear friends. Wishing you the best, always.

(1985 Librairie Arthème Fayard, for the French translation)

=== IV. Gong 2 (Rilke) ===
Bourdonnement épars, silence perverti,
Tout ce qui fut autour, en mille bruits se change,
Nous quitte et revient : rapprochement étrange
De la marée de l'infini.

A scattered buzzing, perverted silence
All that was around us, in a thousand noises changes,
Leaving us and returning: the strange convergence
Of infinity’s tide.

=== V. De Vincent à Théo... (van Gogh) ===
...Tant que durera l'automne, je n'aurai pas assez de mains, de toile et de couleurs pour
peindre ce que je vois de beau.

...J'ai un besoin terrible de religion. Alors, je vais la nuit, dehors, pour peindre les étoiles.
Sentir les étoiles et l'infini, en faut, clairement, alors, la vie est tout de même presque enchantée.

...Tout et partout, la coupole du ciel est d'un bleu admirable, le soleil a un rayonnement de
soufre pâle et c'est doux et charmant comme la combinaison des bleus célestes et des
jaunes dans les Vermeer de Delft. Malheureusement, à côté du soleil du Bon Dieu il y a,
trois quarts du temps, le Diable Mistral.

...Dans mon tableau « café de nuit », j'ai cherché à exprimer que le café est un endroit où
l'on peut se ruiner, devenir fou, commettre des crimes. Enfin, j'ai cherché par des
contrastes de rose tendre et de rouge sang et lie de vin, avec les verts-jaunes et les vertsbleus durs,
tout cela dans une atmosphère de fournaise infernale, de soufre pâle, à exprimer
comme la puissance des ténèbres d'un assommoir.

...As long as autumn lasts, I will not have enough hands, canvas, or colors
to paint the beauty I see.

...I have a terrible need of religion. So, I go into the night, outside, to paint the stars.
Feeling the stars and infinity, clearly, life is then all the same almost enchanted.

...In everything everywhere, the dome of the sky is an admirable blue, and the sun radiates
a pale sulfur, sweet and charming like a combination of celestial blues and the yellows
in the Vermeers of Delft. Sadly, next to the sun of the Good Lord there is,
three quarters of the time, the Mistral Devil.

...In my painting Night Café, I sought to express that the café is a place where
you can ruin yourself, go mad, commit crimes. And finally I sought
the contrasts of tender pink and blood red and wine red, with yellow-greens and harsh blue-greens,
and all this in the atmosphere of an infernal furnace, of pale sulfur, to be expressed
as the power of darkness in an assommoir.

(1960 Éditions Bernard Grasset, French translation by Maurice Beerblock and Loui Roëlandt)

== Instrumentation ==
Woodwinds
piccolo
2 flutes
2 oboes
cor anglais
B♭ bass clarinet
2 B♭ clarinets
2 bassoons

Brass
3 horns
3 trumpets
3 trombones
tuba

Percussion (1 timpanist and 2 percussionists)
5 timpani (1 player)
marimba
vibraphone
2 suspended cymbals (high/medium)
tam-tam (medium)
3 bongo drums
3 tom-tom drums
snare drum
bass drum

Voice
soprano solo

Strings
harp
violins I
violins II
violas
cellos
double basses

Others
accordion
celesta
