= Geneviève Joy =

- Born: 4 October 1919
- Died: 27 November 2009 (aged 90)
- Occupation: Pianist

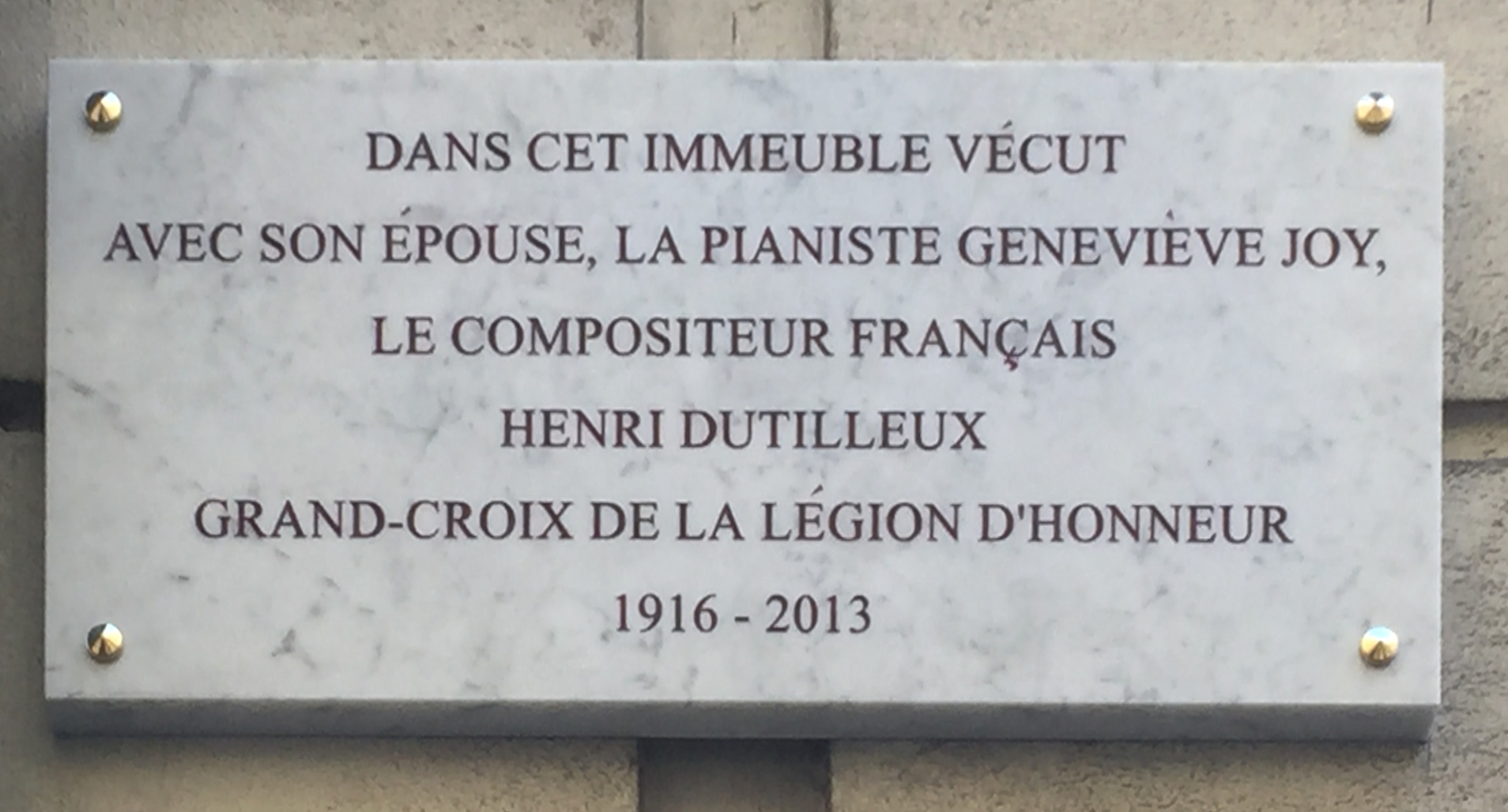
Translation: In This Building With His Wife, Pianist Geneviève Joy, The French Composer Henri Dutilleux lived. Grand Cross of the Legion of Honour 1916 – 2013

Geneviève Joy (French: [ʒənvjɛv ʒwa]; 4 October 1919 – 27 November 2009) was a French classical and modernist pianist who, at the end of World War II in 1945, formed a critically acclaimed duo-piano partnership with Jacqueline Robin which lasted for forty-five years, until 1990. The composer Henri Dutilleux, whom she married in 1946, dedicated his Piano Sonata to her, which she recorded for Erato Records in 1988.

A native of the small commune of Bernaville in the Somme department in Northern France region of Picardy, she was the daughter of Lina Breton from Bernaville and her Irish husband Charles Joy who served with the British Army during World War I. Geneviève Joy was a piano child prodigy who was accepted to the Conservatoire de Paris in 1932 at the age of 12.

In 1982, she served on the jury of the Paloma O'Shea Santander International Piano Competition.

She died in her sleep at a Paris hospital eight weeks after her 90th birthday.
