= Élodie Vignon =

French pianist

- Born: 11 October 1984 (age 40); Lyon
- Occupation: pianist

Élodie Vignon (born 11 October 1984 in Lyon) is a French pianist.

== Early life and studies ==
Élodie Vignon was born in 1984 and began playing the piano at the age of four. She studied at the Conservatoire à rayonnement régional in Lyon at the age of seven and received her Médaille d‘Or in the class of Hervé Billaut in 2001.

In 2004, she was invited to join Daniel Blumenthal's class at Koninklijk Conservatorium Brussels in Belgium. She moved to Brussels and received two master's degrees (piano and chamber music) with distinction.

At the beginning of her career, Élodie Vignon was invited to various festivals and venues in Europe and in the US. She also studied intensively with Nelson Delle-Vigne Fabbri. She is Artist in Residence at the Fondation Bell’Arte in Brussels since 2010.

== Artistic activities ==
Élodie Vignon often plays in Belgium (Brussels, Gand, Courtrai, Anvers, Turnhout, Hasselt...), in France (Lyon, Paris, Vézelay, Dijon, Batz-sur-Mer...), in Luxembourg, but also in Italy (Anghiari, Bari, Brescia), Spain (Pycanya, Valldemossa), Madeira, and Lithuania.

In Belgium, Vignon performed several times with the Amon Quartet and Coryfeye. She often collaborates with the contralto Sarah Laulan and with the Polish cellist Kacper Nowak. The Belgian pianist Julien Libeer is also a current partner on stage. She was one of the main performers of the EuropArt Festival from 2010 to 2017. As a soloist, she gave concerts with various conductors, among others under Philippe Entremont, with whom she collaborated closely. In the US, she's a frequent guest at the Chopin Society of Atlanta.

In 2018, she was invited to perform and teach in Manila, during the masterclass International Piano Festival of Manila, directed by Jovianney Cruz.

== Discography ==
In March 2018, Vignon's first record was published by Cypres Records. The CD contains twelve études for piano from Claude Debussy and "twelve studious boxes" commissioned from the Belgian poet Lucien Noullez.

In Europe, the record was awarded four stars in the French magazine Classica. The Pianist magazine of Germany classified Vignon in the "Debussy best performers". During 2018, Vignon presented this repertoire all over Europe (France, Belgium, Luxembourg, Italy and Spain). She also gave concerts in the US and Canada (North Carolina, Steinway Hall in New York City, Christ Church Cathedral in Montreal).

In summer 2018, Élodie Vignon collaborated with soprano Clara Inglese for a record published in March 2019. It's about the character of Ophelia in the music literature and also contains a composition for Clara Inglese, Élodie Vignon and cellist Sébastien Walnier from Benoît Mernier.

Élodie Vignon is now preparing her second CD with the Piano Sonata and the Three Preludes from Henri Dutilleux. It will be completed by a creation from the Belgian composer Claude Ledoux who wrote for Vignon. The CD will be released by Cypres Records on 14 February 2020, during a concert at the Flagey Piano Days Festival 2020.
