= Sonatine for Flute and Piano =

1943 musical composition by Henri Dutilleux

- by Henri Dutilleux
- Composed: 1943
- Published: 1943
- Movements: three

The Sonatine for Flute and Piano is an early work by the 20th-century French composer Henri Dutilleux, composed and published in 1943. It lasts about 9 minutes and consists of three movements, played without break.

== Overview ==
The Sonatine for Flute and Piano is one of a series of four test pieces for the Paris Conservatoire that Dutilleux wrote between 1942 and 1951. They were commissioned by then-director Claude Delvincourt. These pieces were intended both to test the technique of the students and provide them with new scores.

Dutilleux was notoriously critical of his early works, including the Sonatine. He once stated that he had never been completely happy that it was played so often but he never withdrew it.

... the flute piece is the Sonatine for Flute and Piano, which has been recorded many times abroad, although I have never wanted it to be recorded in France because it doesn’t yet sound really like my music. But I haven’t put any embargo on that.

The work has become a standard of the flute repertoire and has been performed many times by flautists such as Sharon Bezaly, James Strauss and Emmanuel Pahud. As of 2014, it is Dutilleux's most often recorded work.

== Music ==
The sonatine is structured in 3 sections played without a break.

The first section features a mysterious theme in 7/8 contrasting with jagged piano figures. It concludes with a cadenza that provides a transition to the lyrical second section. The last section features rapid exchanges between the flute and the piano before another short but difficult cadenza recalls the themes heard before. A frenzied accelerando played by both instruments concludes the piece.

== Structure ==
1. Allegretto
2. Andante
3. Animé
