= Sur le même accord =

- Concertante music by Henri Dutilleux
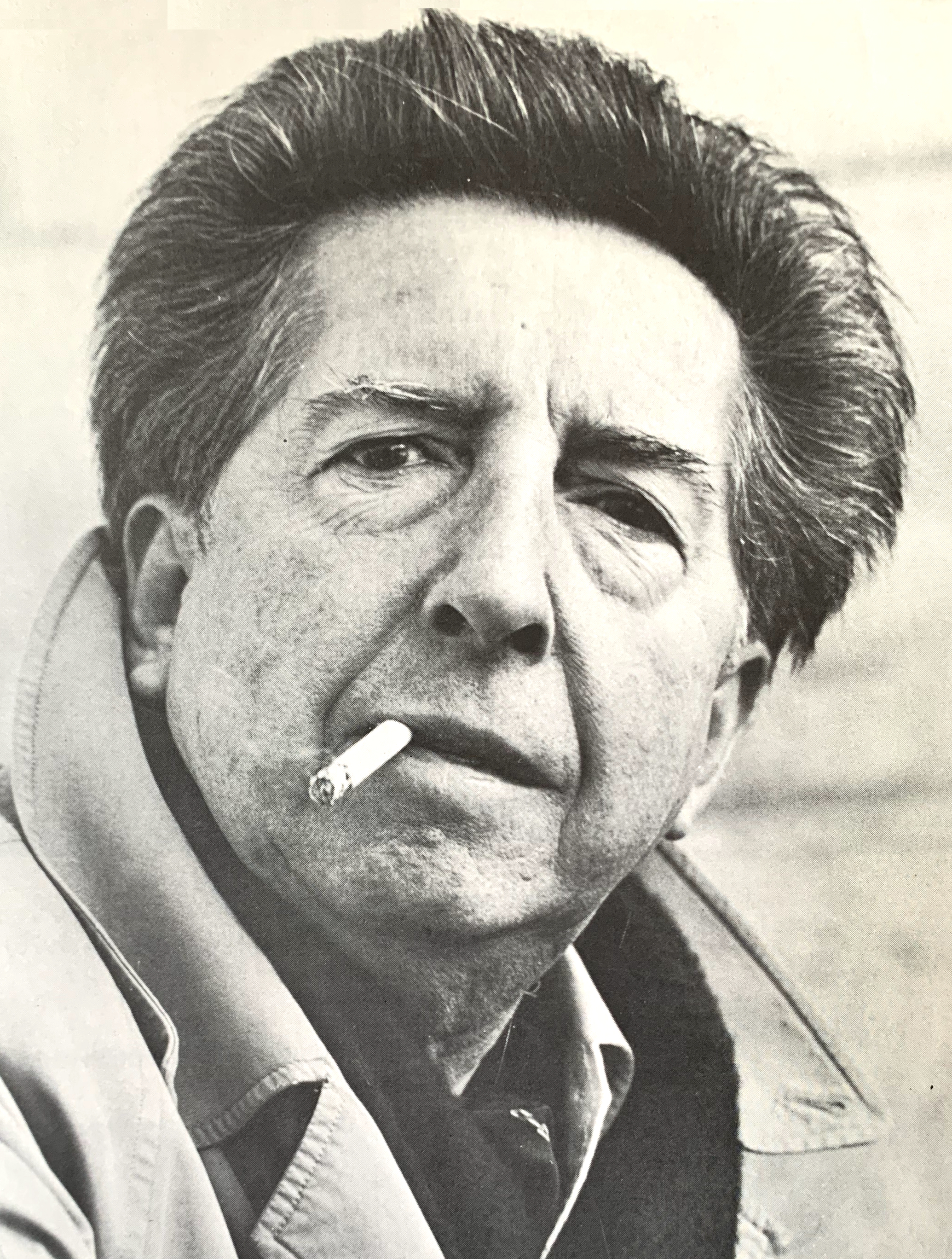
- Dutilleux in 2004
- Dedication: Anne-Sophie Mutter
- Performed: 28 April 2002
- Scoring: violin; orchestra

Sur le même accord (On only one chord) is a piece by the French composer Henri Dutilleux for solo violin and orchestra. It was composed for the violinist Anne-Sophie Mutter, and was premiered by her on 28 April 2002 in London with the London Philharmonic Orchestra conducted by Kurt Masur. The piece lasts about 10 minutes in performance.

Dutilleux describes the piece as "a nocturne-like work". The one movement consists of an introduction followed by an alternation of rapid music and slow, lyrical passages: Introduction – Rapid Music – Lyrical Section I – Rapid Music – Lyrical Section II – Rapid Music.

The entire piece is based on one six-note chord, heard at the beginning of the piece, which is manipulated in various ways. The chord has the property of all-combinatoriality, and Dutilleux uses this property several times to create an aggregate. The piece also features the Dutilleux trademark of mirror writing, which can be heard in several passages. The work is tonally centered on G, which is established by assertion, most notably by the repeated use of the violin's low open G.

== Instrumentation ==
The orchestration of the works is: 2 flutes (1st doubles Piccolo), 2 oboes, 2 clarinets, 1 Bass Clarinet, 2 bassoons, 2 Horns, 2 trumpets, 2 trombones, tuba, timpani, 3 percussion, harp and strings
