= Deux sonnets de Jean Cassou =

- Song cycle by Henri Dutilleux
- Text: poems by Jean Cassou
- Language: French
- Composed: 1954
- Movements: two
- Scoring: baritone; piano

Deux sonnets de Jean Cassou is a song cycle for baritone and piano written by the French composer Henri Dutilleux in 1954. He later transcribed or allowed transcriptions of the work for various ensembles.

It is based on poems written by Jean Cassou when he was a prisoner of war. It has been championed by major singers like Gérard Souzay, Gilles Cachemaille and more recently Renée Fleming.

== Background ==
Jean Cassou was the first Chief Conservator of the Musée National d'Art Moderne. He was dismissed from his post by the Vichy government in 1940 and subsequently joined the Résistance. As a result, he was arrested and, while in prison, he conceived Trente-trois sonnets composés au secret (Thirty-three sonnets composed in solitary confinement) which he had to memorize since he was denied pen and paper. They were clandestinely published in 1944.

== Songs ==
Dutilleux first encountered Cassou's poems in 1944, shortly after they were published. Ten years later, he reread them and decided to set to music two of them, for baritone and piano: "Il n'y avait que des troncs déchirés" (There was nothing but torn trunks) and "J'ai rêvé que je vous portais entre mes bras" (I dreamed that I carried you in my arms). The songs are markedly contrasted. The first one is violent and depicts a ruined castle, the second one is calm and dream-like, a remembrance of past love.

=== Sonnet 8 ===
Il n'y avait que des troncs déchirés,
que couronnaient des vols de corbeaux ivres,
et le chäteau était couvert de givre,
ce soir de fer où je me présentai.

Je n'avais plus avec moi ni mes livres,
ni ma compagne, l'âme, et ses péchés,
ni cette enfant qui tant rêvait de vivre
quand je l'avais sur terre rencontrée.

Les murs étaient blanchis au lait de sphinge
et les dalles rougies au sang d'Orphée.
Des mains sans grâce avaient tendu des linges

Aux fenêtres borgnes comme des fées.
La scène était prête pour des acteurs
fous et cruels à force de bonheur.

=== Sonnet 4 ===
J'ai rêvé que vous portais entre mes bras,
depuis la cour jusqu'à votre salon obscur.
Vous sembliez une soeur des chères créatures
que j'adore, mais je ne vous connaissais pas.

Il faisait une nuit de lune et de frimas,
une nuit de la vie, sonore d'aventures.
Tandis que je cherchais à voir votre figure,
je vous sentais légère et tremblante de foi.

Puis je vous ai perdue comme tant d'autres choses,
la perle de secrets et le safran des roses,
que le songe ou la terre offrirent à mon coeur.

Signes de ma mémoire, énigmes, tout me mène,
avec chaque soleil formé à si grand peine,
au chef-d'oeuvre d'une fort et lucide malheur.

== Transcriptions ==
In the mid-1990s, Dutilleux orchestrated the song-cycle. Chandos Records released the premier recording of the orchestrated version in 1996.

In 2011, Pascal Gallois transcribed it for bassoon and piano with the composer's approval. The transcription was played at the Hôtel de Lauzun in presence of the composer.

Dutilleux transcribed both songs for soprano and orchestra for Renée Fleming who recorded them in 2012 on her album Poèmes.

== Other Cassou sonnets set to music by Dutilleux ==
Dutilleux discovered Cassou's poems in 1944 and immediately wrote "La Geôle" (The Jail) for voice and orchestra based on one of them.

In 1954, he set "Eloignez-vous" (Walk away) to music, along with "Il n'y avait que des troncs déchirés" and "J'ai rêvé que je vous portais entre mes bras". Although the three poems were premièred together, "Eloignez-vous" was not included in the cycle and only resurfaced in April 2011.

Dutilleux had this to say about his work on Cassou's poems:

I chose three of the Trente-Trois Sonnets composés au secret, published during the Occupation, as I've already said, by the underground press Les Éditions de Minuit (Jean Cassou was still in prison at the time). I had already set one of them, which I called "La Geôle", and dedicated it to my brother Paul, who was held in a prisoner-of-war-camp. That song has been published.

I had been greatly struck by the beauty of these sonnets, in which contained violence was mingled with gentleness, and in 1954 I read them again. Their nobility of thought, now that they are distanced from the terrible times that gave rise to them, places them in the category of pure lyric poetry. I should like to quote Cassou himself when he refers to these lines, "at last delivered from the sob that gave them birth."

Much later, in 1982, it was a very moving experience for me to stand next to him at a ceremony at the Élysée Palace, when we were both decorated by François Mitterrand. But on that occasion it was not only the poet that the president was honoring, it was the great Resistance leader – "Jean Noir" to give his underground name.

So in 1954 I started to set three more of these sonnets with the idea of including the "La Geôle" in the cycle. These songs were broadcast by the BBC in 1991 and have been since published and recorded.
