= Métaboles =

Orchestral work by Henri Dutilleux

- by Henri Dutilleux
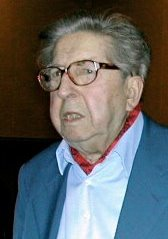
- Henri Dutilleux, 2004
- Occasion: 40th anniversary of the Cleveland Orchestra
- Commissioned by: George Szell
- Composed: 1963–64
- Duration: about 16 minutes
- Movements: Five
- Scoring: Orchestra

Premiere
- Date: 14 January 1965
- Conductor: George Szell
- Performers: Cleveland Orchestra

Métaboles is an orchestral work by Henri Dutilleux, commissioned by the conductor George Szell in 1959 to mark the fortieth anniversary of the Cleveland Orchestra. Métaboles was composed in 1963–64 and was first performed by Szell and the Cleveland Orchestra on 14 January 1965.

== Description ==
In the early 1960s, Dutilleux wanted to move away from traditional musical forms and develop new structures that changed according to the internal logic of a particular piece. It is with this central concern in mind, a concern that the work's very title indicates, that he began to compose Métaboles. In the composer's own words:

The rhetorical term Métaboles, applied to a musical form, reveals my intention: to present one or several ideas in a different order and from different angles, until, by successive stages, they are made to change character completely.

In other words, throughout the work, various melodic, harmonic, and rhythmic ideas are presented and then gradually modified to the point that they transform into something radically different and undergo a complete change of nature. This new idea then serves as the basis for the next series of metamorphosis.

The piece is cast in five overlapping movements that are played without pause. Each section, except the last one, highlights a particular instrumental group, allowing Métaboles to be described as concerto for orchestra.

It opens with a series of chords played by the woodwinds and centered on E natural, with short interjections by pizzicato strings and harp. The sound world is reminiscent of Stravinsky's early "Russian Period". The strings pick up a variant of the melody for a brief moment and this variant is then elaborated on in the radiant second movement, wholly dedicated to divisi strings. Similarly, an idea presented in a double bass solo becomes the seed for the third movement, which is dominated by brass instruments and in the fourth movement, percussions outline a slowed-down reminiscence of the preceding section. Finally, the fifth movement brings all the instruments together. It combines various melodic, harmonic, and rhythmic elements from the first four sections before reinstating the E natural chords heard at the very beginning and then rushing to an exhilarating coda.

== Movements ==
The work is in five linked movements. Dutilleux indicates that "towards the end of each piece, a new motif appears as a filigree under the symphonic texture and 'sets the bait' for the next piece, and so on...".

1. Incantatoire
2. Linéaire
3. Obsessionnel
4. Torpide
5. Flamboyant

== Instrumentation ==
Métaboles is scored for an orchestra with the following instruments.

Woodwinds

4 flutes (3rd and 4th doubling piccolos)
3 oboes
1 cor anglais
2 B♭ clarinets
1 E♭ clarinet
1 bass clarinet
3 bassoons
1 contrabassoon

Brass

4 horns
4 trumpets
3 trombones
1 tuba

Percussion

timpani

temple blocks
snare drum
tom-toms
bass drum
small suspended cymbal
Chinese cymbal
tam-tams
crash cymbals
triangle
cowbell
xylophone
glockenspiel

Keyboards

celesta

Strings

harp

violins I
violins II
violas
cellos
double basses
