= Symphony No. 1 (Dutilleux) =

Symphony by Henri Dutilleux

- by Henri Dutilleux
- Year: 1951
- Movements: Four

Premiere
- Date: 7 June 1951
- Location: Théâtre des Champs-Élysées, Paris
- Conductor: Roger Désormière
- Performers: Orchestre National de France

Henri Dutilleux's Symphony No. 1 was written in 1951. A composition from the composer's relatively early period, it is Dutilleux's first purely orchestral composition. It is written in a very classical form (four movements), but its language is rather free. It is orchestrated for 85 instrumentalists.

The premiere took place at the Théâtre des Champs-Élysées on 7 June 1951, with Roger Désormière conducting the Orchestre National de France.

== Music ==
The symphony lasts approximately half an hour. It is written in four movements:

1. Passacaglia
2. Scherzo molto vivace
3. Intermezzo
4. Finale con variazioni

This symphony demonstrates Dutilleux's attachment to the use of variation form, which is found in the outer two movements. The use of a passacaglia as a symphonic first movement is extremely rare. It consists of 35 repetitions of a four-bar bass motif, shown in the opening four bars by the double basses. The second movement was defined by Dutilleux as an 'original and energetic scherzo', and very 'virtuosic and demonstrative'. In the third movement, he develops a process that he uses more extensively in several later compositions: the main theme is not presented immediately at the beginning, but hidden in a slow evolution of themes (reverse variation). The finale starts with a majestic percussion display, before returning to a calmer atmosphere.

The symphony was a big step for Dutilleux's career, as it demonstrated his mastery of orchestration. In 1955 it was awarded the UNESCO Mozart Medal in the inaugural edition of the International Rostrum of Composers.
