= Music theatre =

Experimental performance genre

Music theatre is a performance genre that emerged over the course of the 20th century, in opposition to more conventional genres like opera and musical theatre. The term came to prominence in the 1960s and 1970s to describe an avant-garde approach to instrumental and vocal composition that included non-sonic gesture, movement, costume and other visual elements within the score. These compositions (such as György Ligeti’s Aventures (1962), Mauricio Kagel’s Match (1964) and Peter Maxwell Davies’s Eight Songs for a Mad King (1968)) were intended to be performed on a concert hall stage, potentially as part of a longer programme of pieces. Since the 1980s, the term music theatre has come to include any live project that uses the techniques and theories of avant-garde theatre and performance art to experiment with new ways of combining music and theatre; this has been extended to include some of the historical works that influenced the music theatre of the 1960s, such as Arnold Schoenberg's Pierrot lunaire (1912), Igor Stravinsky's L'Histoire du soldat (1918) and Kurt Weill's Mahagonny-Songspiel (1927). (Note: The composer Alexander Goehr wrote, "I believed that new forms of Music Theatre, created by ourselves and like-minded friends, would only succeed if I could find a pedigree of existing related repertoire to perform along with the new pieces." Hall 2015, p. x) The unconventional scale and unfamiliar aesthetic language of this work often positions it outside of the established traditions, institutions and discourses of opera and musical theatre. For this reason, the genre has also been called new music theatre and experimental music theatre.

Music theatre projects are often composer-led, with the composer deciding many elements of the text, staging and design which would usually be determined by a librettist, director or designer. Examples of key music theatre artists who compose and direct their work include Georges Aperghis and Heiner Goebbels. Some music theatre artists, such as Laurie Anderson, Meredith Monk and Robert Ashley, also perform their own work. Other directors of music theatre include Robert Wilson and Christoph Marthaler, and some pieces are created collectively by performance companies such as Poland's Song of the Goat and Germany's Die Maulwerker.

The validity of music theatre as a genre distinct from opera and musical theatre varies according to the national context. In some countries, like Germany and Belgium, the concept is widely understood and supported by a dedicated infrastructure of festivals, venues and funding bodies; in other countries, it is wholly subsumed within opera, theatre or performance art, or else banished to a marginal status beyond categorisation. Nevertheless, a renewed compositional interest in non-sonic, theatrical and "performative" elements from 21st century composers such as Simon Steen-Andersen, Johannes Kreidler and Jennifer Walshe has led to a resurgence in interest in the genre and its history.
