= Jean Sulem =

French concert violist and teacher (born 1959)

Jean Sulem is a French concert violist and teacher born in 1959. He has studied in the Conservatoire de Paris with Serge Collot. He has played in the "Ensemble Contemporain" directed by Pierre Boulez. He founded the Rosamonde Quartet in 1981 and is still an active member today. In addition to his concert career, he is a jury member in major international contests (Berlin, Geneva, Munich, Tokyo,...), teaches the viola at the Conservatoire de Paris (from 1989) and holds master classes in Europe and America. He is a regular lecturer at the Accademia di Cervo, and the Academie de Sion (Switzerland).
