= Symphony No. 2 (Dutilleux) =

- Le Double
- by Henri Dutilleux
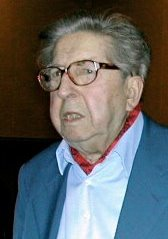
- Dutilleux in 2004
- Composed: 1955–59
- Dedication: To the memory of Serge and Nathalie Koussevitzky
- Duration: ca. 30 minutes
- Movements: Three
- Scoring: Orchestra

Premiere
- Date: 11 December 1959
- Location: Boston
- Conductor: Charles Munch
- Performers: Boston Symphony Orchestra

Henri Dutilleux's Symphony No. 2 Le Double is an orchestral work completed in 1959, commissioned by the Koussevitzky Music Foundation for the 75th anniversary of the Boston Symphony Orchestra. It is written for an orchestra and a second group comprising an oboe, a clarinet, a bassoon, a trumpet, a trombone, two violins, a viola, a cello, a harpsichord, a celesta, and timpani.

== Overview ==
The work consists of back-and-forth interaction between the two instrumental groups, like that of a concerto grosso although the approach is different: in this piece, the smaller ensemble acts as a mirror or ghost of the larger one, sometimes playing similar or complementary lines, sometimes contrasting ones.

In Dutilleux's own words:

My work incorporates a rather singular formation. Division into two groups: in the first, 12 musicians chosen amongst the first desk players, disposed in a semi-circle around the conductor; in the second, the entire orchestra. This arrangement can hardly help evoking the traditional concerto grosso, although my ideal in fact has been to escape from this form whose pre-fabricated dimension seems incompatible with contemporary language. I thus endeavoured to avoid the stumbling block of the somewhat archaic form; the twelve musicians of the smaller orchestra considered separately do not constantly play the role of soloists; it is the mass they form that constitutes the solo element. This mass does not merely confront and dialogue with the larger formation, but at times fuses with, or superimposes itself upon the latter, leaving ample opportunity for polyrhythmics and polytonality.

== Structure ==
The symphony has three movements, a performance taking around a half-hour.

1. Animato, ma misterioso
2. Andantino sostenuto
3. Allegro fuocoso – Calmato
