= Timbres, espace, mouvement =

1978 work for orchestra composed by Henri Dutilleux

- 'La nuit étoilée'
- by Henri Dutilleux
- The Starry Night by Van Gogh (1889), the inspiration for this work
- Composed: 1978
- Scoring: orchestra

Timbres, espace, mouvement (Timbre, space, movement) is a work for orchestra composed by Henri Dutilleux in 1978. Dutilleux subtitled the work La nuit étoilée (The Starry Night), in reference to the 1889 painting by Vincent van Gogh. The composer wanted to translate in his composition the "almost cosmic whirling effect which (the painting) produces". Dutilleux dedicated the work to the memory of Charles Münch and to Mstislav Rostropovich, the conductor of its premiere.

Mstislav Rostropovich commissioned the work, and conducted the premiere with Washington National Symphony Orchestra on 7 November 1978. Dutilleux revised the work in 1990 with the addition of an interlude for 12 cellos between the two original movements. The work is approximately 20 minutes' duration.

== Instrumentation ==
The instrumentation consists of:

Woodwinds

2 piccolos (doubling on flute)
2 flutes (flute 2 doubles on alto flute)
3 oboes
oboe d'amore
E♭ clarinet
2 clarinets in A
bass clarinet
3 bassoons
contrabassoon

Brass

4 horns
3 trumpets
3 trombones
tuba

Percussion

timpani
crotales

suspended cymbals
tam-tams
bongos
tom-toms
snare drum
marimba
glockenspiel

Keyboards

celesta

Strings

harp

12 celli
10 double basses

Dutilleux has omitted violins and violas from his instrumentation. Their absence was meant to translate the impression of relative emptiness and immobility conveyed by the lower half of the painting. On the other hand, the wind instruments and percussions are particularly prominent. Their solos represent the movements of the clouds and the light of the stars and the moon. Space is represented by an unusual distribution of the celli. They are placed at the foreground in a half circle around the conductor. The movement is symbolized by the alternation of static episodes and whirling solos.

== Sources ==
- Henri Dutilleux: His Life and Works, Caroline Potter ISBN 1-85928-330-6
- Henri Dutilleux: Timbres, espace, mouvement on max-texier.ircam.fr
- Dutilleux, Henri at The Living Composers Project Contains information on orchestral composition
