= Ainsi la nuit =

- String quartet by Henri Dutilleux
- Composed: 1973–76
- Dedication: "to the memory of Ernest Sussman and in homage to Olga Koussevitzky"
- Performed: 1977
- Movements: seven

Premiere
- Performers: Parrenin Quartet

Ainsi la nuit (Thus the Night) is a string quartet written by the French composer Henri Dutilleux between 1973 and 1976. It was premiered in 1977 by the Parrenin Quartet.

It is considered one of the most important works in the genre. The piece has been recorded many times by several prominent ensembles.

== Overview ==
Ainsi la nuit was commissioned by the Koussevitzky Foundation for the Juilliard String Quartet. Dutilleux dedicated the composition to the memory of the art lover Dr. Samuel Ernest Sussman and as homage to Olga Koussevitzky, widow of Serge Koussevitzky.

Before starting to work on the piece, Dutilleux studied the string quartets of Beethoven and Bartók as well as Webern's Six Bagatelles. The composer stated that the latter were a particularly important influence for Ainsi la nuit. He first wrote a series of preliminary studies titled Nuits (Nights), some of which were sent to the Juilliard String Quartet in 1974. However, the work in its final form was premiered by the Parrenin Quartet on January 6, 1977. The Juilliards gave the American première of the piece in Washington, D.C., on April 13, 1978.

== Music ==
The piece is based on series of studies which focus on different aspects of sound production: pizzicatos, harmonics, dynamics, contrasts, opposition of register. It is built from a single hexachord that contains the notes C♯ – G♯ – F – G – C – D, thus highlighting the intervals of fifth and major second. This chord constitutes the basis from which the whole string quartet is derived. The octatonic mode is also used extensively throughout the work.

Ainsi la nuit displays progressive growth, a technique frequently used by Dutilleux, through which musical motifs can both recall music that was heard in earlier sections or hint at music that will be fully developed in later movements.

There's a tendency—it's almost entirely intuitive—not to present the theme in its definitive state at the beginning. [T]here are small cells which develop bit by bit. ...This may perhaps show the influence of literature, of Proust and his notions about memory.

Other techniques that are typical of Dutilleux can be found in the work such as fan-shaped phrases, a modal quality reminiscent of Gregorian chant as well as the highlighting of tonal triads in an atonal context.

== Structure ==
The work is in seven interrelated movements played without a break.

1. Nocturne
2. Miroir d'espace
3. Litanies
4. Litanies II
5. Constellations
6. Nocturne II
7. Temps suspendu

It lasts about 18 minutes.

== Recordings ==
Ainsi la nuit has been played and recorded many times since it was published. Some recordings include:

- Via Nova Quartet– Erato Records (1982)
- Sine Nomine Quartet– Erato (1991)
- Ludwig Quartet– Timpani (1991)
- Juilliard String Quartet – Sony (1992)
- Arditti String Quartet – Naive (1993)
- Petersen Quartett – Capriccio (1994)
- Ortys Quartet – Mis (1999)
- Belcea Quartet – EMI Classics (2000)
- Rosamonde Quartet – Arion (2005)
- Orpheus String Quartet – Channel Classics (2007)
- Arcanto Quartet – Harmonia Mundi (2010)
- Quatuor Hermes – La Dolce Volta (2018)
- Quatuor Ébène - Warner Classics (2021)
- Brooklyn Rider – In a circle records (2025)
