= Tout un monde lointain... =

1970 concertante work composed by Henri Dutilleux

- Concertante music by Henri Dutilleux
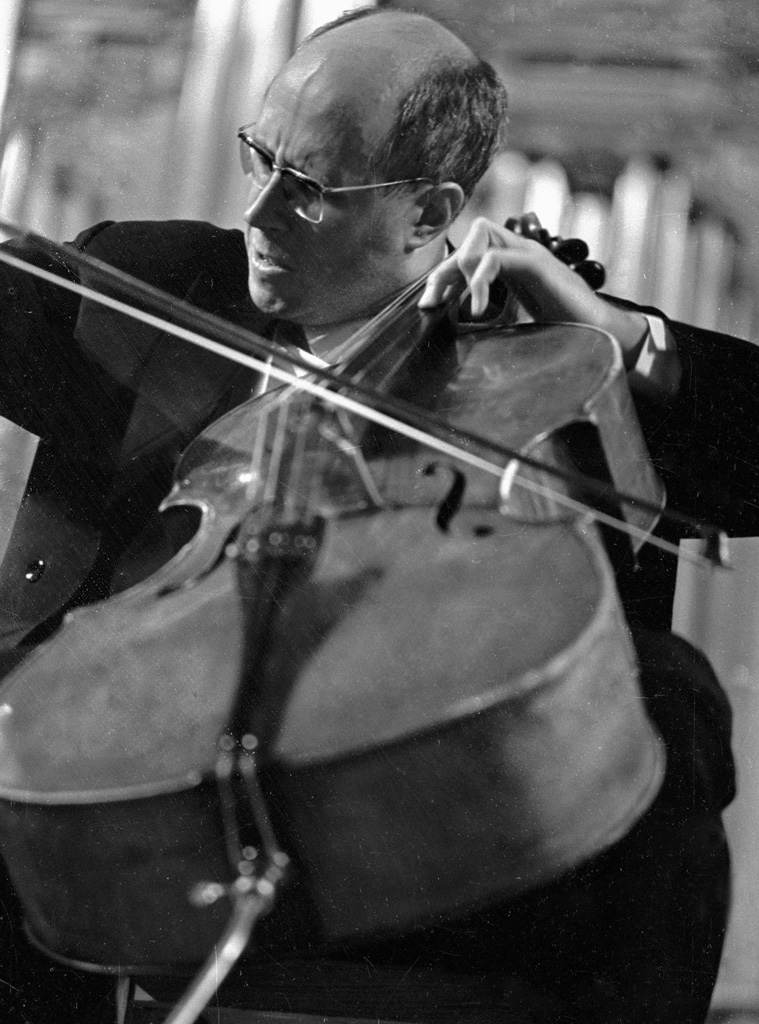
- Mstislav Rostropovich, the cellist for whom the work was written, in 1959
- English: A whole distant world...
- Based on: poetry by Charles Baudelaire
- Composed: 1967–70
- Movements: five
- Scoring: cello; orchestra

Premiere
- Date: 25 July 1970
- Location: Festival d'Aix-en-Provence
- Conductor: Serge Baudo
- Performers: Mstislav Rostropovich; Orchestre de Paris

Tout un monde lointain... (A whole distant world...) is a concertante work for cello and orchestra composed by Henri Dutilleux between 1967 and 1970 for Mstislav Rostropovich. It is considered one of the most important 20th-century additions to the cello repertoire and several major cellists have recorded it. Despite the fact that the score does not state that it is a cello concerto, Tout un monde lointain... has always been considered as such.

Each of the five movements was inspired by the poetry of Charles Baudelaire, and the overall feel of the work is mysterious and oneiric. A typical performance runs approximately 27 minutes.

== Composition ==
The work was initially commissioned by Igor Markevitch for the Concerts Lamoureux and Mstislav Rostropovich around 1960. Occupied with other projects, Dutilleux only completed the concerto in 1970. Since Markevitch had left the Concerts Lamoureux in 1961, Rostropovich was accompanied for the premiere by the Orchestre de Paris, conducted by Serge Baudo, at the Festival d'Aix-en-Provence (25 July 1970). The cello part was edited by the Russian cellist and published with his fingerings.

== Instrumentation ==
In addition to the solo cello part, the concerto is scored for two flutes, piccolo, two oboes, two clarinets, bass clarinet, two bassoons, contrabassoon, three horns, two trumpets, two trombones, tuba, celesta, harp, timpani, percussion (bongos, tom-toms, snare drum, bass drum, crotales, triangle, suspended cymbals, cymbals, gongs, tam-tams, xylophone, marimba, and glockenspiel), and strings.

== Form ==
The piece has five movements, each bearing a title and a quotation from a poem from Les fleurs du mal, by Charles Baudelaire. Dutilleux began to work on Baudelaire's poetry on Roland Petit's advice.

The title of the score itself is a quotation from the poem La chevelure: "Tout un monde lointain, absent, presque défunt" (A whole distant world, absent, almost defunct) which is included in Les fleurs du mal. Moreover, each movement is prefaced by a quotation from Baudelaire.

1. Énigme: Très libre et flexible
  "... Et dans cette nature étrange et symbolique" (from Poème XXVII)
2. Regard: Extrêmement calme
  "... le poison qui découle
  De tes yeux, de tes yeux verts,
  Lacs où mon âme tremble et se voit à l'envers" (from Le poison)
3. Houles: Large et ample
  "... Tu contiens, mer d'ébène, un éblouissant rêve
  De voiles, de rameurs, de flammes et de mâts..." (from La chevelure)
4. Miroirs: Lent et extatique
  "... Nos deux cœurs seront deux vastes flambeaux
  Qui réfléchiront leurs doubles lumières
  Dans nos deux esprits, ces miroirs jumeaux..." (from La mort des amants)
5. Hymne: Allegro
  "Garde tes songes:
  Les sages n'en ont pas d'aussi beaux que les fous !" (from La voix)
1. Enigma: Very free and flexible
  "... And in this strange and symbolic nature"
2. Gaze: Extremely calm
  "... the poison that flows
  from your eyes, from your green eyes,
  lakes in which my soul trembles and sees itself upside down"
3. Surges: Wide and ample
  "... You contain, sea of ebony, a dazzling dream
  of sails, of rowers, of flames and of masts..."
4. Mirrors: Slow and ecstatic
  "... Our two hearts will be two large torches
  that will reflect their double lights
  in our two spirits, those twin mirrors..."
5. Hymn: Allegro
  "Keep your dreams:
  wise men do not have as beautiful ones as fools!"

There is no break or pause between the movements.

== Description ==
1. Énigme (Enigma)
  The piece opens with soft drum and cymbal rolls followed by a tentative 12-note theme played by the cello. This theme is cross-referenced throughout the work. The orchestra appears gradually and starts a dialogue with the soloist. The music is at first quiet but leads to the main section which is highly rhythmic and displays extended techniques. It ends with the soloist playing a high A, which is also the first note of the second movement.
2. Regard (Gaze)
  This is the first slow movement of the work. The cello line is modal in character and stays in the instrument's high register. The music forms a long arch and ends on a reprise of the motif that opened the work.
3. Houles (Surges)
  The middle movement functions as a scherzo with an extremely difficult solo part. It is a colourful and dream-like seascape that starts with a passage for cello alone, gradually joined by the orchestra. The last notes provide a link to the next movement.
4. Miroirs (Mirrors)
  This is the second slow movement. The cello line is once again modal. It is accompanied by calm, liquid pulsation from the percussions and "mirror" chords played by the harp as well as phrases in backwards motion by the violins. Towards the end, the 12-note motif that opened the work reappears.
5. Hymne (Hymn)
  The last movement recasts some material from the preceding movements. The music goes through several nervous climaxes then disappears suddenly on a suspended tremolo figure played by the cello.

== Discography ==
- Mstislav Rostropovich (cello), Orchestre de Paris, Serge Baudo (cond.). Recorded November 5–6, 1974 (Salle Wagram, Paris). EMI Records.
- Arto Noras (cello), Finnish Radio Symphony Orchestra, Jukka-Pekka Saraste (cond.). Recorded 1992. Finlandia Records.
- Lynn Harrell (cello), Orchestre National de France, Charles Dutoit (cond.). Recorded 1995. Decca Records.
- Boris Pergamenschikow (cello), BBC Philharmonic, Yan Pascal Tortelier (cond.). Recorded February 4–5, 1997 (Manchester). Chandos Records.
- Truls Mørk (cello), Orchestre Philharmonique de Radio France, Myung-Whun Chung (cond.). Recorded July 17–19, 2001 (Maison de Radio France, Paris). EMI Records/Virgin Classics.
- Jean-Guihen Queyras (cello), Orchestre National Bordeaux Aquitaine, Hans Graf (cond.). Recorded 2002. Arte Nova Classics.
- Marc Coppey (cello), Orchestre Philharmonique de Liège, Pascal Rophé (cond.). Recorded July 12–15, 2007. Aeon Records.
- Christian Poltéra (cello), Vienna Radio Symphony Orchestra, Jac van Steen (cond.). Recorded November, 2008 (RadioKulturhaus, Vienna, Austria). Bis Records.
- Anssi Karttunen (cello), Orchestre Philharmonique de Radio France, Esa Pekka Salonen (cond.). Recorded in 2012. Deutsche Grammophon.
- Xavier Phillips (cello), Seattle Symphony, Ludovic Morlot (cond.). Recorded in 2013. Seattle Symphony Media.
- Emmanuelle Bertrand (cello), Luzerner Sinfonieorchester, James Gaffigan (cond.). Recorded in 2015. Harmonia Mundi France.
- Johannes Moser (cello), Rundfunk-Sinfonieorchester Berlin, Thomas Søndergård (cond.). Recorded in 2018. Pentatone Records.
