= Le temps l'horloge =

- Song cycle by Henri Dutilleux
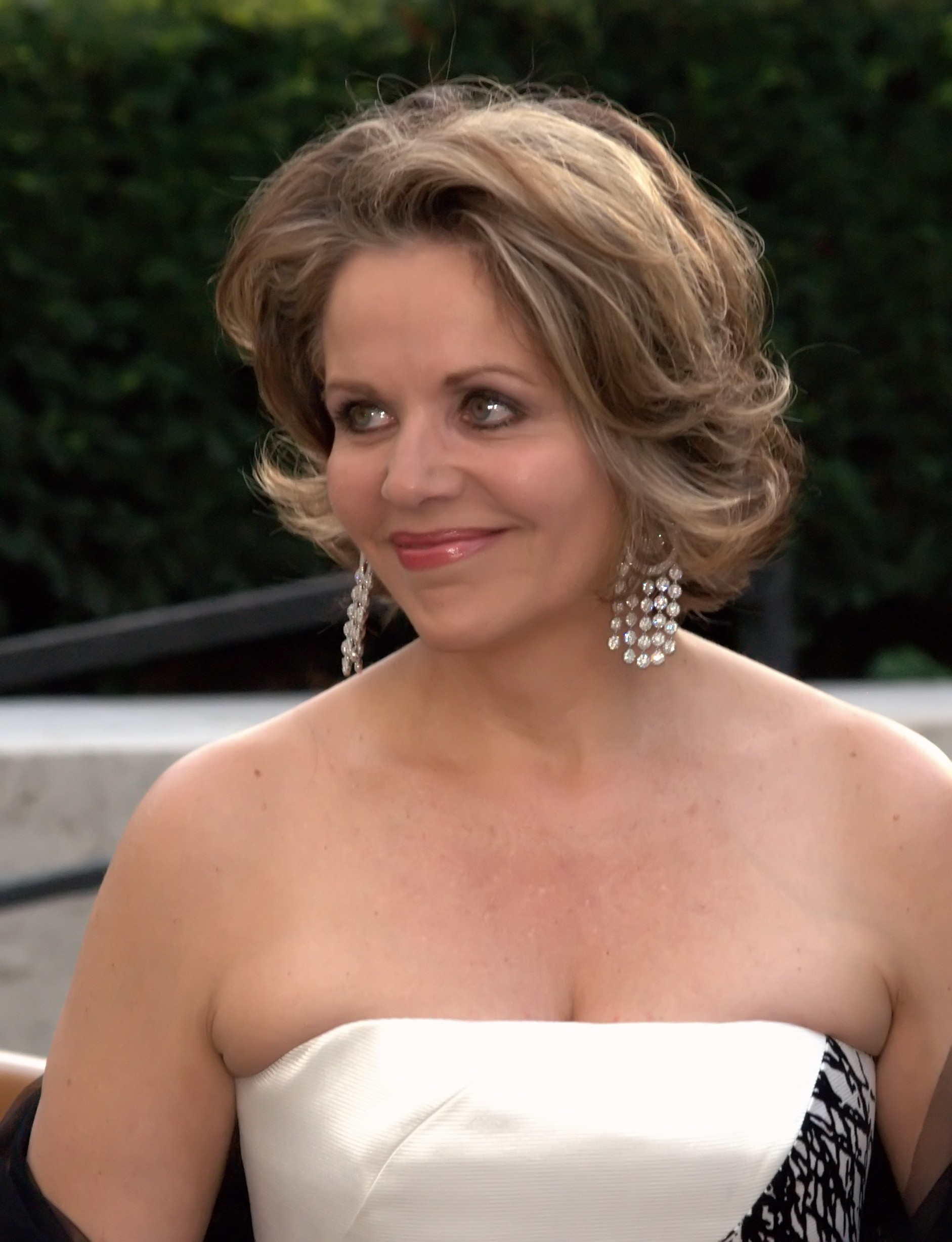
- Renée Fleming whose voice inspired the composition, in 2009
- English: Time and the Clock
- Language: French
- Based on: poems by Jean Tardieu and Robert Desnos, later Baudelaire
- Composed: 2006–2007
- Movements: three, later five
- Scoring: soprano; orchestra

Premiere
- Date: 6 September 2007
- Location: Saito Kinen Festival Matsumoto
- Conductor: Seiji Ozawa
- Performers: Renée Fleming; Saito Kinen Orchestra

Le temps l'horloge (Time and the Clock) is a song cycle for soprano and orchestra, by the French composer Henri Dutilleux.

He wrote the original three-movement version between 2006 and 2007 based on two poems by Jean Tardieu ("Le temps l'horloge" and "Le masque"), and one by Robert Desnos ("Le dernier poème"'). He later added a fourth purely instrumental movement, "Interlude", inspired by another Tardieu poem ("Le futur antérieur"), and a fifth based on Charles Baudelaire's prose poem, "Enivrez-vous".

The work was composed for American soprano Renée Fleming, whom Dutilleux called "a great artist". The composer said, "I constantly thought of her voice's character, of her power of lyrical expression" while writing the piece.

== Performance history ==
Le temps l'horloge was jointly commissioned by the Saito Kinen Festival Matsumoto (Seiji Ozawa, Director), the Boston Symphony Orchestra (James Levine, Music Director), and the Orchestre National de France (Kurt Masur, Music Director).

Seiji Ozawa led Fleming and the Saito Kinen Orchestra in the world premiere on 6 September 2007, at the Saito Kinen Festival in Matsumoto City, Japan. Fleming gave the American premiere with the Boston Symphony Orchestra, conducted by James Levine, on 29 November 2007, and the same performers gave the New York premiere on 3 December 2007, in the Stern Auditorium at Carnegie Hall.

The première of the complete five-movement work took place on 7 May 2009 at the Théâtre des Champs-Élysées, Paris. The performers included Renée Fleming (soprano), the Orchestre National de Radio France and Seiji Ozawa (conductor). She and the Boston Symphony presented the US première of this version under François-Xavier Roth on 14 January 2016.

== Instrumentation ==
Le temps l'horloge is scored for piccolo, two flutes, two oboes, two clarinets, bass clarinet, two bassoons, contrabassoon, three horns, three trumpets, three trombones, tuba, timpani, crotales, high and medium suspended cymbals, two tam-tams, wood block, bass drum, vibraphone, marimba, harp, celesta, harpsichord, accordion, and strings.

== Recording ==
- Renée Fleming, Seiji Ozawa and the Orchestra National de France – Poèmes – Decca CD – 2012.
