= Henri Dutilleux =

French composer (1916–2013)

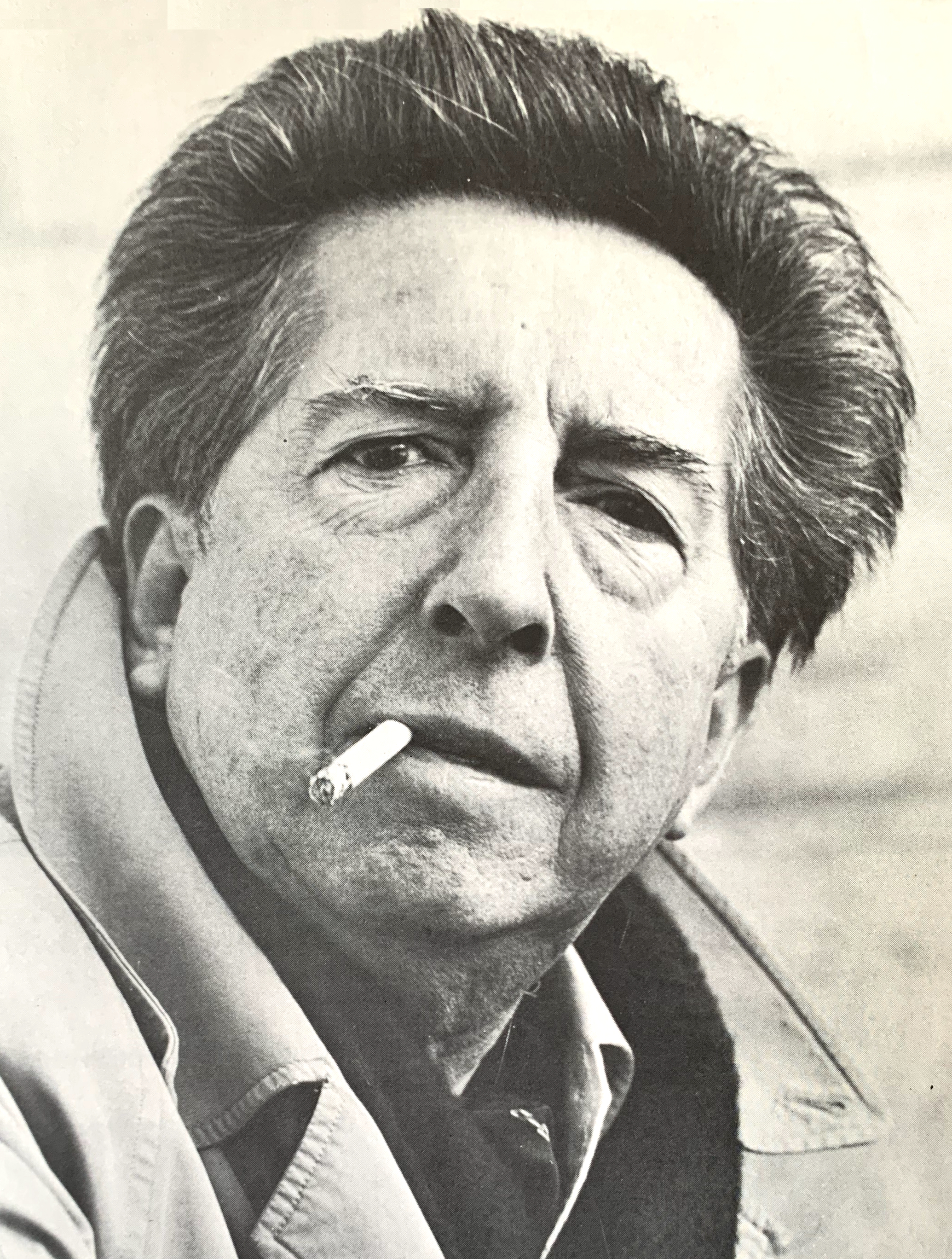
- Dutilleux in 2004
- Born: Henri Paul Julien Dutilleux; 22 January 1916; Angers, Maine-et-Loire, France
- Died: 22 May 2013 (aged 97); Paris, France
- Occupation: Composer
- Works: List of compositions

Henri Paul Julien Dutilleux (French: [ɑ̃ʁi dytijø]; 22 January 1916 – 22 May 2013) was a French composer of late 20th-century classical music. Among the leading French composers of his time, his work was rooted in the Impressionistic style of Debussy and Ravel, but in an idiosyncratic, individual style. Among his best-known works are his early Flute Sonatine and Piano Sonata; concertos for cello, Tout un monde lointain... ("A whole distant world") and violin, L'arbre des songes ("The tree of dreams"); a string quartet known as Ainsi la nuit ("Thus the night"); and two symphonies: No. 1 (1951) and No. 2 Le Double (1959).

Works were commissioned from him by such major artists as Charles Munch, George Szell, Mstislav Rostropovich, the Juilliard String Quartet, Isaac Stern, Paul Sacher, Anne-Sophie Mutter, Simon Rattle, Renée Fleming, and Seiji Ozawa. In addition to composing, he worked as the Head of Music Production for Radio France for 18 years. He also taught at the École Normale de Musique de Paris and at the Conservatoire National Supérieur de Musique, and was twice composer in residence at the Tanglewood Music Center in Lenox, Massachusetts.

Among Dutilleux's many awards and honours were the Grand Prix de Rome (1938) and the Ernst von Siemens Music Prize (2005). When describing him, the music critic Paul Griffiths wrote that "Mr. Dutilleux's position in French music was proudly solitary. Between Olivier Messiaen and Pierre Boulez in age, he was little affected by either, though he took an interest in their work. But his voice, marked by sensuously handled harmony and color, was his own."

== Life ==
Henri Dutilleux was born on 22 January 1916 in Angers, Maine-et-Loire. He was the great-grandson of the painter Constant Dutilleux and grandson of the composer Julien Koszul. He was also a cousin of the mathematician Jean-Louis Koszul. He studied harmony, counterpoint, and piano with Victor Gallois at the Douai Conservatoire before leaving for the Conservatoire de Paris. There, between 1933 and 1938, he attended the classes of Jean and Noël Gallon (harmony and counterpoint, in which he won joint first prize with the cellist Paul Tortelier), Henri Büsser (composition) and Maurice Emmanuel (history of music).

Dutilleux won the Prix de Rome in 1938 for his cantata L'anneau du roi but did not complete his entire residency in Rome due to the outbreak of World War II. He worked for a year as a medical orderly in the army and returned to Paris in 1940, where he worked as a pianist, arranger and music teacher. In 1942, he conducted the choir of the Paris Opera.

Dutilleux worked as Head of Music Production for Radio France from 1945 to 1963. He served as professor of composition at the École Normale de Musique de Paris from 1961 to 1970. He was appointed to the staff of the Conservatoire National Supérieur de Musique in 1970 and was composer-in-residence at Tanglewood in 1995 and 1998. His students included Gérard Grisey, Francis Bayer, Alain Gagnon, Jacques Hétu, and Kenneth Hesketh. Invited by Walter Fink, in 2006 he was the 16th composer featured in the Rheingau Musik Festival's annual Komponistenporträt.

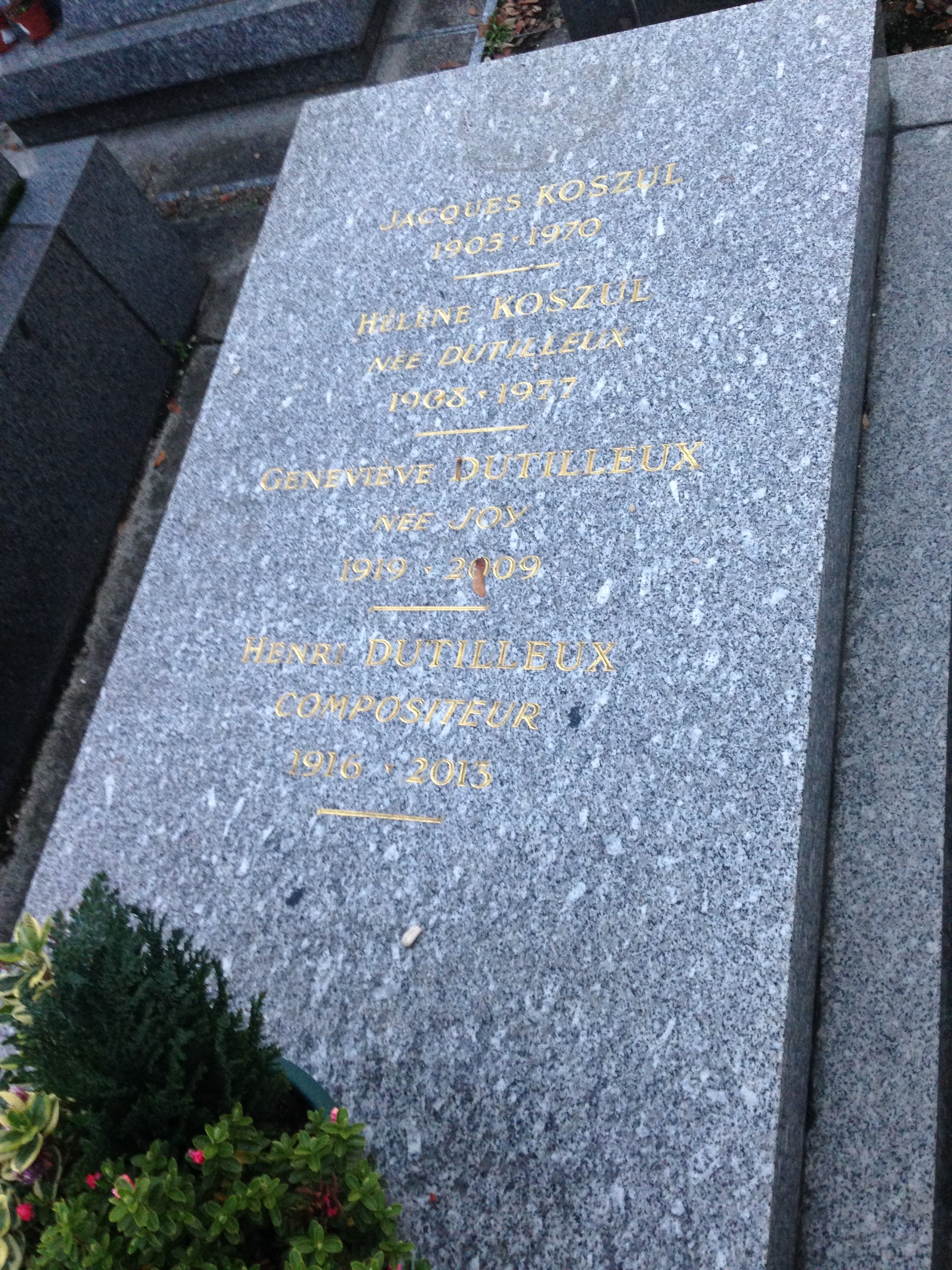
The gravestone of Henri Dutilleux and Geneviève Joy

For many years, Dutilleux had a studio on Île Saint-Louis. He died on 22 May 2013 in Paris, aged 97, and was buried in Montparnasse Cemetery, in the same grave as Geneviève, his wife who died in 2009. His tombstone is made of grey granite and bears the epitaph "Compositeur".

== Influences and style ==
Dutilleux's music extends the legacies of French composers such as Debussy and Ravel but is also clearly influenced by Béla Bartók and Igor Stravinsky. Among his favourite pieces, he mentioned Beethoven's late string quartets and Debussy's Pelléas et Mélisande.

His attitude toward serialism was ambiguous. While he always paid attention to developments in contemporary music and incorporated some serialist techniques into his work, he also criticized the more radical and intolerant aspects of the movement: "What I reject is the dogma and the authoritarianism which manifested themselves in that period." Dutilleux refused to be associated with any school.

Dutilleux's music contains distant echoes of jazz, as can be heard in the plucked double bass strings at the beginning of his First Symphony and his frequent use of syncopated rhythms. He often calls for Ray Robinson-style cup mutes in the brass section, which seems to indicate the influence of big band music. Dutilleux was greatly enamoured of vocalists, especially the jazz singer Sarah Vaughan and the great French chanson singers.

Some of Dutilleux's trademarks include very refined orchestral textures; complex rhythms; a preference for atonality and modality over tonality; the use of pedal points that serve as atonal pitch centers; and "reverse variation", whereby a theme is revealed gradually, appearing in its complete form only after a few partial, tentative expositions. His music also displays a strong sense of structure and symmetry. This is particularly obvious from an "external" point of view, in the overall organisation of the different movements or the spatial distribution of the various instruments, but is also apparent in the music itself (themes, harmonies and rhythms mirroring, complementing or opposing each other). According to Stuart Jefferies, "A passage may be conceived as a symmetrical shape of notes on paper and only later given musical substance. He loves symmetrical musical figures such as palindromes or fan-shaped phrases".

Dutilleux's music was influenced by art and literature, such as the works of Vincent van Gogh, Charles Baudelaire and Marcel Proust. It also shows a concern for the concepts of time and memory, both in its use of quotations (notably from Bartók, Benjamin Britten, and Jehan Alain), and in short interludes that recall material used in earlier movements and/or introduce ideas that will be fully developed later.

A perfectionist with a strong sense of artistic integrity, he allowed only a small number of his works to be published; what he did publish he often repeatedly revised. In his own words:

I always doubt my work. I always have regrets. That's why I revise my work so much and, at the same time, I regret not being more prolific. But the reason I am not more prolific is because I doubt my work and spend a lot of time changing it. It's paradoxical, isn't it?

== Compositional history ==
Dutilleux numbered as Op. 1 his Piano Sonata (1946–1948), written for the pianist Geneviève Joy, whom he married in 1946. He renounced most of the works he composed before it because he did not believe them to be representative of his mature standards, considering many of them to be too derivative to have merit.

After the Piano Sonata, Dutilleux started working on his First Symphony (1951). It consists of four monothematic movements and has a perfectly symmetrical structure: music slowly emerges from silence (first movement—a passacaglia) and builds towards a fast climax (second—a scherzo and moto perpetuo), keeps its momentum (third—"a continuous melodic line that never goes back on itself"), and finally slowly fades out (fourth—a theme and variations).

In 1953, Dutilleux wrote the music for the ballet Le loup ("The Wolf").

In his Second Symphony, titled Le double (1959), the orchestra is divided into two groups: a small one at the front with instruments taken from the various sections (brass, woodwind, strings and percussion) and a bigger one at the back consisting of the rest of the orchestra. Although this brings to mind the Baroque concerto grosso, the approach is different: in this piece, the smaller ensemble acts as a mirror or ghost of the bigger one, sometimes playing similar or complementary lines, sometimes contrasting ones.

His next work, Métaboles for orchestra (1965) explores the idea of metamorphosis, how a series of subtle and gradual changes can radically transform a structure. A different section of the orchestra dominates each of the first four movements before the fifth brings them all together. As a result, it can be considered as a concerto for orchestra. It quickly achieved celebrity and, following its première by George Szell and the Cleveland Orchestra, was performed in several North American cities, then in France. Métaboles is one of his most often performed works.

In the 1960s, Dutilleux met Mstislav Rostropovich, who commissioned a cello concerto from him. Rostropovich premièred the work, Tout un monde lointain… (A whole distant world...), in 1970. It is considered one of Dutilleux's major achievements.

After the cello concerto, Dutilleux turned to chamber music for the first time in more than 20 years and wrote the string quartet Ainsi la nuit (1976). It consists of seven movements, some of which are linked by short "parentheses". The parentheses' function is to recall material that has already been heard and to introduce fragments that will be fully developed later. It is based on a hexachord (C♯–G♯–F–G–C–D) that highlights the intervals of fifth and major second. Each movement emphasizes various special effects (pizzicato, glissandi, harmonics, extreme registers, contrasting dynamics...), resulting in a difficult, elaborate work.

Dutilleux also published various works for piano (3 Préludes, Figures de résonances) and 3 strophes sur le nom de Sacher (1976–1982) for solo cello. The latter was originally composed on the occasion of Paul Sacher's 70th birthday in 1976, on a request by Rostropovich to write compositions for cello solo using his name spelt out in musical notes as the theme eS-A-C-H-E-Re (Es is E♭ in German, H is B♮ in German, and Re is D in French; see Sacher hexachord). He then returned to orchestral works in 1978 with Timbres, espace, mouvement ou la nuit étoilée, inspired by Van Gogh's The Starry Night. In this composition, Dutilleux attempted to translate into musical terms the opposition between emptiness and movement the painting conveys. It employs a string section of only lower-register instruments: cellos and basses, no violins or violas.

In 1985, Isaac Stern premiered L'arbre des songes (The Tree of Dreams), a violin concerto he had commissioned from Dutilleux. According to the composer, it is based on a process of continual growth and renewal: "All in all the piece grows somewhat like a tree, for the constant multiplication and renewal of its branches is the lyrical essence of the tree. This symbolic image, as well as the notion of a seasonal cycle, inspired my choice of 'L'arbre des songes' as the title of the piece."

Dutilleux's later works include Mystère de l'instant (for cymbalum, string orchestra and percussion, 1989), Les Citations (for oboe, harpsichord, double bass and percussion, 1991), The Shadows of Time (for orchestra and children voices, 1997), Slava's Fanfare (for Rostropovich's 70th birthday, 1997) and Sur le même accord (for violin and orchestra, 2002, dedicated to Anne-Sophie Mutter). In 2003, he completed Correspondances, a song cycle for soprano and orchestra inspired by poems and letters by Van Gogh, Prithwindra Mukherjee, Rainer Maria Rilke, and Aleksandr Solzhenitsyn. This work received a very enthusiastic reception and has been programmed several times since its première.

Dutilleux's last major work was the song cycle Le temps l'horloge, written for American soprano Renée Fleming. It consists of four pieces and an instrumental interlude on two poems by Jean Tardieu, one by Robert Desnos and one by Charles Baudelaire. The first three songs were premièred at the Saito Kinen Festival Matsumoto, Japan in September 2007. The American première of this partial version took place in November 2007 with the Boston Symphony Orchestra. The complete work was unveiled on 7 May 2009 at the Théâtre des Champs-Elysées in Paris.

In 2010, Dutilleux added a third movement to his chamber work Les citations. The expanded version was premiered at the Festival d’Auvers-sur-Oise.

In 2011, with Dutilleux's approval, Pascal Gallois transcribed three of his early vocal works for bassoon and piano: Regards sur l'Infini (from the early cycle for voice and piano Quatre mélodies) and Deux sonnets de Jean Cassou (originally for baritone and piano). He played them in a concert at the Hôtel de Lauzun in Dutilleux's presence.

Dutilleux allowed only a small fraction of his work to be published. He often expressed a wish to write more chamber music, notably a second string quartet, a piece for clarinet and ensemble, one for solo double bass, and more piano préludes. He long considered composing an opera but abandoned that project because he could not find a libretto that appealed to him.

Those who commissioned works from Dutilleux include Szell (Métaboles), Rostropovich (Tout un monde lointain… and Timbres, espace, mouvement), Stern (L'arbre des songes), Mutter (Sur le même accord), Charles Munch (Symphony No. 2 Le double), and Seiji Ozawa (The Shadows of Time and Le temps l'horloge).

== Legacy ==
After Dutilleux's death, the composer and conductor Laurent Petitgirard paid tribute to him as "one of the very rare contemporary composers" whose music became part of the repertoire in his lifetime, predicting that "[h]is work will remain intensely present after his death".

Several major musicians and conductors championed Dutilleux's works, notably Stern, Sacher, Mutter, Fleming, Ozawa, Munch, Szell, Rostropovich, Simon Rattle, and the Juilliard String Quartet.

The conductor and composer Esa-Pekka Salonen said of Dutilleux, "His production is rather small but every note has been weighed with golden scales... It's just perfect – very haunting, very beautiful. There's some kind of sadness in his music which I find very touching and arresting."

The critic Tom Service wrote for the BBC, "Dutilleux's exquisite catalogue of pieces is becoming, rightly, ever more popular with performers and listeners all over the world".

An obituary in Gramophone commented, "Dutilleux represented a generation of musicians with roots almost back into the 19th century; certainly his music can be seen in a direct line from that of his great predecessors Debussy and Ravel." In an obituary in The Guardian, Roger Nichols described him as "the outstanding French composer between Messiaen and Boulez", adding that he "achieved a wholly individual synthesis of ear-catching colours and harmonies with formal rigour."

The Daily Telegraph said, "Because Dutilleux was a perfectionist and self-critical to a fault, his output was small. He wrote barely a dozen major works in his career, destroyed much of his early music and often revised what he had written. His early work was clearly derivative of Ravel, Debussy and Roussel; but his later music, though influenced by Bartok and Stravinsky, was entirely original and often seemed—in its scale—more German than French." The Daily Telegraph's critic Philip Hensher called Dutilleux "the Laura Ashley of music; tasteful, unfaultable, but hardly ever daring ... Personally, I can't stick him."

Rob Cowan, the BBC Radio 3 presenter and critic, recalled in June 2013 an interview with Dutilleux in which he told Cowan that his personal favourite among his own works was Tout un monde lointain....

== Awards and honours ==
- Grand Prix de Rome (for his cantata L'Anneau du Roi) – 1938
- UNESCO's International Rostrum of Composers (for Symphony No. 1) – 1955
- Grand Prix National de Musique (for his entire oeuvre) – 1967
- Praemium Imperiale (Japan – for his entire oeuvre) – 1994
- Monaco : Commander of the Order of Saint-Charles (13 May 1998)
- Prix MIDEM Classique de Cannes (for The Shadows of Time) – 1999
- France : Grand'Croix of the Légion d'honneur (31 December 2003)
- Grand-Croix de la Légion d'honneur – 2004
- Ernst von Siemens Music Prize (for his entire oeuvre) – 2005
- Prix MIDEM Classique de Cannes (for his entire oeuvre) – 2007
- Cardiff University Honorary Fellowship (for his entire oeuvre) – 2008
- Gold Medal of the Royal Philharmonic Society – 2008
- Marie-Josée Kravis Prize for New Music – 2011
