= Polina Pasztircsák =

Hungarian opera singer

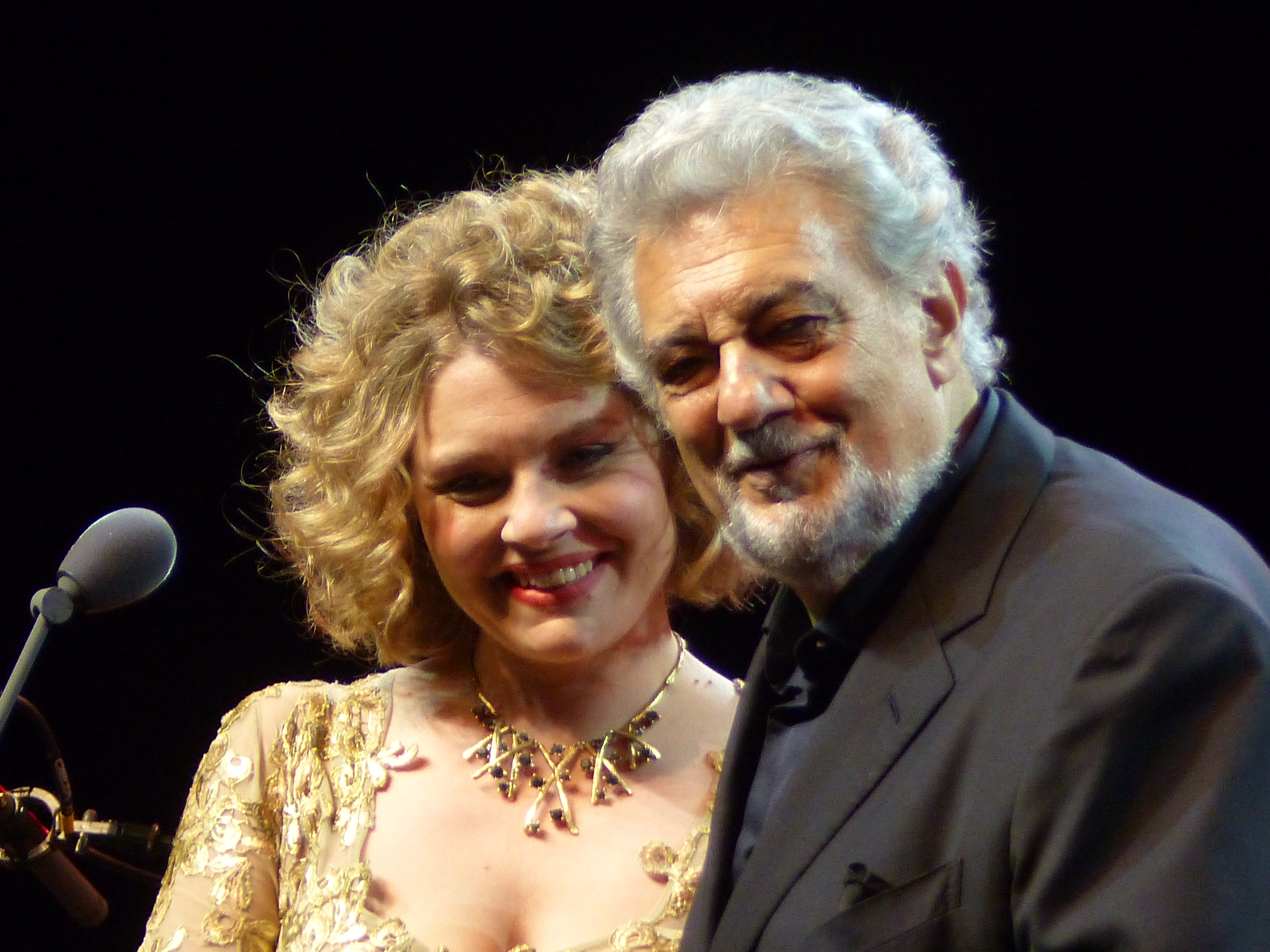
Polina Pasztircsák, Plácido Domingo, 2016

Polina Pasztircsák (international spelling: Pastirchak; born 24 September 1982) is a Hungarian opera and concert singer (soprano).

== Biography ==
=== Education and early career ===
Pastirchak was born in Budapest as the second daughter of a Hungarian father and a Russian mother. Her parents are designers, as well as her sister, Larisza Pasztircsák is the founder of the fashion label Mrs Herskin. Pastirchak began studying voice at the age of 19 with her first teacher, Julia Bikfalvy, in Budapest. In 2004, she won the Simandy National Singing Competition. She continued her musical studies in Italy as a pupil of Mirella Freni. In 2010, she completed her degree in Conservatorio Girolamo Frescobaldi in Ferrara. In addition to her musical studies, she attained a degree in Cultural Management at the West Hungarian University. She works on her repertoire with vocal coaches Carol Richardson-Smith and Jeffrey Smith, as well as on her Liedrepertoire with Jan Philip Schulze in Hanover. In 2007, she made her operatic debut in Modena in a contemporary opera by Lorenzo Ferrero, Le piccole storie. Here at Teatro Comunale Modena, in the next season, she sang with great success in the role of Micaëla. Her international breakthrough came in 2009 when she won the first prize and all special prizes at the Geneva International Music Competition. In 2011, she sang Partenope at the Handel festival in Karlsruhe, and in 2013 Woglinde in the new ring production of Grand Théâtre de Genève.

=== Artistic development ===
Since 2011, Pastirchak is regularly guesting at the Hungarian State Opera House with roles like Desdemona, Amelia, Nedda, Violetta, Melisande, Mimì, Micaëla, Donna Anna, and Contessa. In 2014, she made an important debut as Strauss's Daphne conducted by Zoltán Kocsis. She returns every year at Ádám Fischer's Budapest Wagner Festival as Gutrune. In 2016, she sang Vespina in Cavalli's Veremonda at the Schwetzingen Festival, Mimì in St. Gallen. Later she sang Traviata at the Capitole de Toulouse, Humperdinck's Königskinder and Weinberger’s Schwanda in Oper Graz. Since 2019, Pastirchak has been regularly working with René Jacobs and the Freiburger Barockorchester with whom she sang Donna Anna and Agathe in Freischütz with a CD recording by Harmonia Mundi.

Pastirchak is also in demand as a concert soloist, for example with Beethoven's IX. and Mahler's IV., which she sang with Ádám Fischer, Christian Arming, Henrik Nanasi and Clemens Schuldt. In 2019, she recorded Beethoven's Missa Solemnis with Harmonia Mundi, René Jacobs and the Freiburger Barockorchester. In the same year, Sony recorded Shostakovich's XIV. Symphonie with Michael Sanderling and the Dresden Philharmonic. In 2011, she sang Mozart arias with Sabine Meyer, Andreas Spering and the Kammerorchester Basel at the Menuhin Festival Gstaad, which was also recorded by Sony. In Mahler's VIII. Symphonie she sang Una Poenitentium conducted by Adam Fischer in Düsseldorf. On the occasion of Arvo Pärt's 80 birthday, she sang Como Cierva Sedienta conducted by Gabor Takács-Nagy in Manchester in the presence of the composer. As a soprano soloist, she sang furthermore Mendelssohn's Lobgesang (Thomas Dausgaard, Swedish Chamber Orchestra), Elias (György Vashegyi, Orfeo Orchestra), Berlioz's Les Nuits d’Ete and Verdi's Requiem (Francesco Angelico, Tiroler Symphonieorchester, Sinfonia Varsovia), Strauss Vier letzte Lieder (Alejo Perez, Orchestre de la Suisse Romande), Ravel Sheherazade (Vassily Sinaisky, Hungarian National Philharmonic), Händel's Brockes Passion (Howard Arman, Capella Savaria), Bach Cantatas (Maurice Steger, Concerto Köln), Beethoven's Egmont (Nikolai Alexeev, St. Petersburg Philharmonic Orchestra).

In gala concerts, she sang as a partner of Plácido Domingo, Jose Carreras, Elena Garanca, Erwin Schrott and Jose Cura. She enjoys singing operetta in festive concerts such as in the Concertgebouw Amsterdam with Marc Albrecht, in the Menuhin Festival Gstaad, in Palermo and Vicenza with Gabor Takács-Nagy, in Köln with Helmut Froschauer and in Kazan with Aleksander Sladkovsky. A significant part of her singing activity are chamber concerts and song recitals with her pianist, Jan Philip Schulze, such as in the Züricher Tonhalle, Marburger Konzertverein, Radio France, Budapest Spring Festival, Mahler Festival in Toblach, Sommets Musicaux Gstaad, Capitole de Toulouse, Jewish Summer Festival, kamara.hu Festival, etc.

=== Opera roles and engagements (selection) ===
Year	Role	Venues
2007	Irma (Le piccole storie)	Teatro Comunale Modena
2009	Mimi (La bohème)	Nationaltheater Szeged; Hungarian State Opera (2012); Graz Opera (Okt. 2017); Theater St. Gallen (2017); Volksoper Wien (2023)
2009	Micaëla (Carmen)	Teatro Comunale Modena; Hungarian State Opera (2013)
2011	Partenope (Partenope)	Haendel Festival Karlsruhe
2013	Violetta Valéry (La traviata)	Hungarian State Opera; Capitole de Toulouse (2018)
2013	Woglinde (Rheingold, Götterdämmerung)	Grand Théâtre de Genève (2013, Feb. 2019)
2013	Desdemona (Otello)	Hungarian State Opera
2014	Nedda (Pagliacci)	Hungarian State Opera
2015	Daphne (Daphne)	Müpa Budapest
2016	Vespina (Veremonda)	Schwetzingen Festival
2016	Contessa (Le nozze di Figaro)	Erkel Theatre Budapest
2016	Donna Anna (Don Giovanni)	Erkel Theatre Budapest; Asian Tour with René Jacobs (2019)
2017	Gutrune (Götterdämmerung)	Müpa Budapest Wagner Festival
2018	Amelia (Simon Boccanegra)	Hungarian State Opera
2019	Gänsemagd (Die Königskinder)	Opernhaus Graz
2021	Dorotka (Schwanda)	Oper Graz
2022	Agathe (Der Freischütz)	German Tour
2022	Mélisande (Pelleas et Mélisande)	Hungarian State Opera

=== Concert repertoire and performances (selection) ===
Composer	Title	Performers
	Soviet Lieder with Jan Philip Schulze (Revolution-Perestroika)	Amici della Musica di Padova 2019
	Christmas concert at Aachen Dom	WDR Funkhausorchester, Enrico Delamboye (2018)
	”Alles Walzer!”	WDR Funkhausorchester, Helmut Froschauer (2014)
	Operetta Gala	Netherlands Philharmonic, Marc Albrecht (2018)
Johann Sebastian Bach	Cantatas	Concerto Köln, Maurice Steiger (2016)
Ludwig van Beethoven	Egmont	St Petersburg Philharmonic Orchestra, Nicolai Alexeev (2012)
Ludwig van Beethoven	9th Symphony	Düsseldorfer Symphoniker, Ádám Fischer (2017); Württembergische Philharmonie Reutlingen, Fawzi Haimor (2020)
Ludwig van Beethoven	Missa Solemnis	Freiburger Barockorchester, RIAS Kammerchor, René Jacobs (Philharmonie de Paris, Mai 2019)
Hector Berlioz	Les Nuits d’Ete	Sinfonia Varsovia, Francesco Angelico (2011)
Gabriel Fauré	Requiem	Grand Theatre Geneve (2010)
George Frideric Handel	Brockes Passion	Capella Savaria, Howard Arman (2016)
Gustav Mahler	4th Symphony	Komische Oper Berlin, Henrik Nánási (2017)
Gustav Mahler	8th Symphony	Düsseldorfer Symphoniker, Ádám Fischer (2018)
Felix Mendelssohn	Elijah	Orfeo Orchestra, György Vashegyi (2018)
Felix Mendelssohn	2nd Symphony	Swedish Chamber Orchestra, Thomas Dausgaard (2014)
Wolfgang Amadeus Mozart	Arias	Sabine Meyer, Kammerorchester Basel, Andreas Spering (2015)
Arvo Paert	Como cierva sedienta	Manchester Chamber Orchestra, Gábor Takács-Nagy (2015)
Maurice Ravel	Shéhérazade	Hungarian National Philharmonic, Vassily Sinaisky (2017)
Dmitri Shostakovich	14th Symphony	Dresdner Philharmonie, Michael Sanderling (Kulturpalast Dresden, Jan. 2019)
Richard Strauss	Vier letzte Lieder	Orchestre de la Suisse Romande, Alejo Perez (Victoria Hall Geneva, 2013)
Giuseppe Verdi	Requiem	Tiroler Symphonieorchester Innsbruck, Francesco Angelico (2014)

== Awards and recognitions ==
- Simandy József National Singing Competition, Hungary, 1. prize and Tchaikovsky prize (2004)
- Geneva International Music Competition, 1. prize, audience prize and special prizes(2009)
- ARD International Music Competition, special prize of Walter and Charlotte Hamel Foundation (2012)
- Cross of merit (silver) of the Hungarian State (2016)
- Kammersänger of the Hungarian State Opera (2016)

== Discography ==
- Polina Pasztircsák: R. Strauss, D. Shostakovich, B. Bartók, Z. Kodály. Musikkollegium Winterthur, Alexander Rahbari. Montres Breguet, Ysaye Records 2010.
- Mozart Arias: Arrangements for clarinet & orchestra by Andreas N. Tarkmann. Polina Pasztircsák, soprano, Sabine Meyer clarinet, Kammerorchester Basel conducted by Andreas Spering. Sony, 2012.
- György Selmeczi: Spiritisti. Polina Pasztircsák as Colombina. Hungarian State Opera, 2017.
- Gustav Mahler: Symphonie 8. Tonhalle Düsseldorf, Adam Fischer. Deutschlandradio, 2018
- Dmitri Shostakovich: Symphonies 1–15 with Polina Pasztircsák as a soloist in Symphony No. 14. Dresden Philharmonic, Michael Sanderling. Sony, 2019.
- Ludwig van Beethoven: Missa Solemnis. Freiburger Barockorchester, René Jacobs. Harmonia Mundi, 2021.
- Carl Maria von Weber: Der Freischütz. Freiburger Barockorchester, René Jacobs. Harmonia Mundi, 2022.
