= Jascha Heifetz =

Russian and American violinist (1901–1987)

- Яша Хейфец
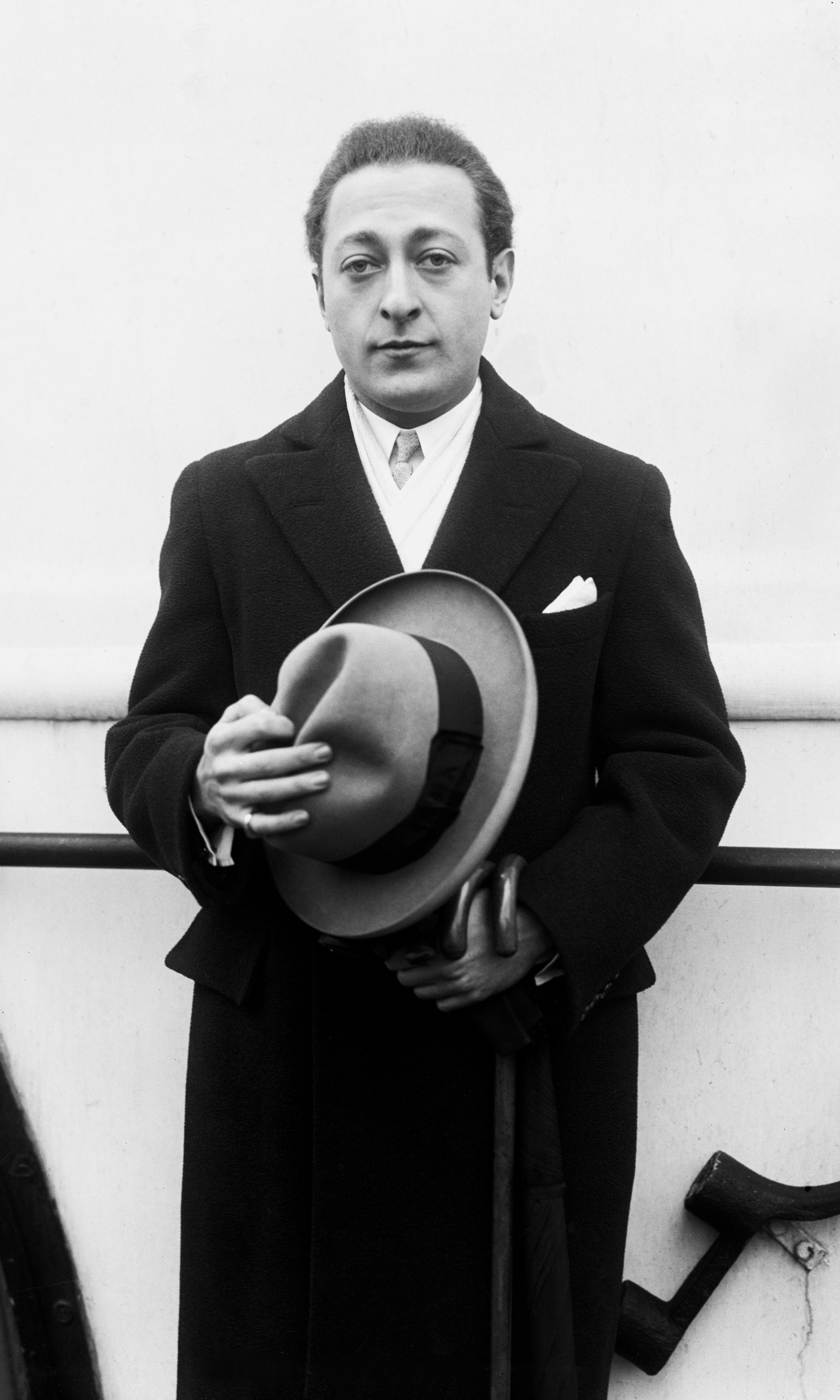
- Heifetz, c. 1940
- Born: Joseph Ruvimovich Heifetz; February 2, 1901; Vilna, Russian Empire
- Died: December 10, 1987 (aged 86); Los Angeles, California, U.S.
- Occupations: Violinist; composer; music educator
- Years active: 1906–1974
- Spouses: Florence Vidor (m. 1928; div. 1945) Frances Spiegelberg (m. 1947; div. 1963)
- Children: 3
- Website: jaschaheifetz.com

Signature
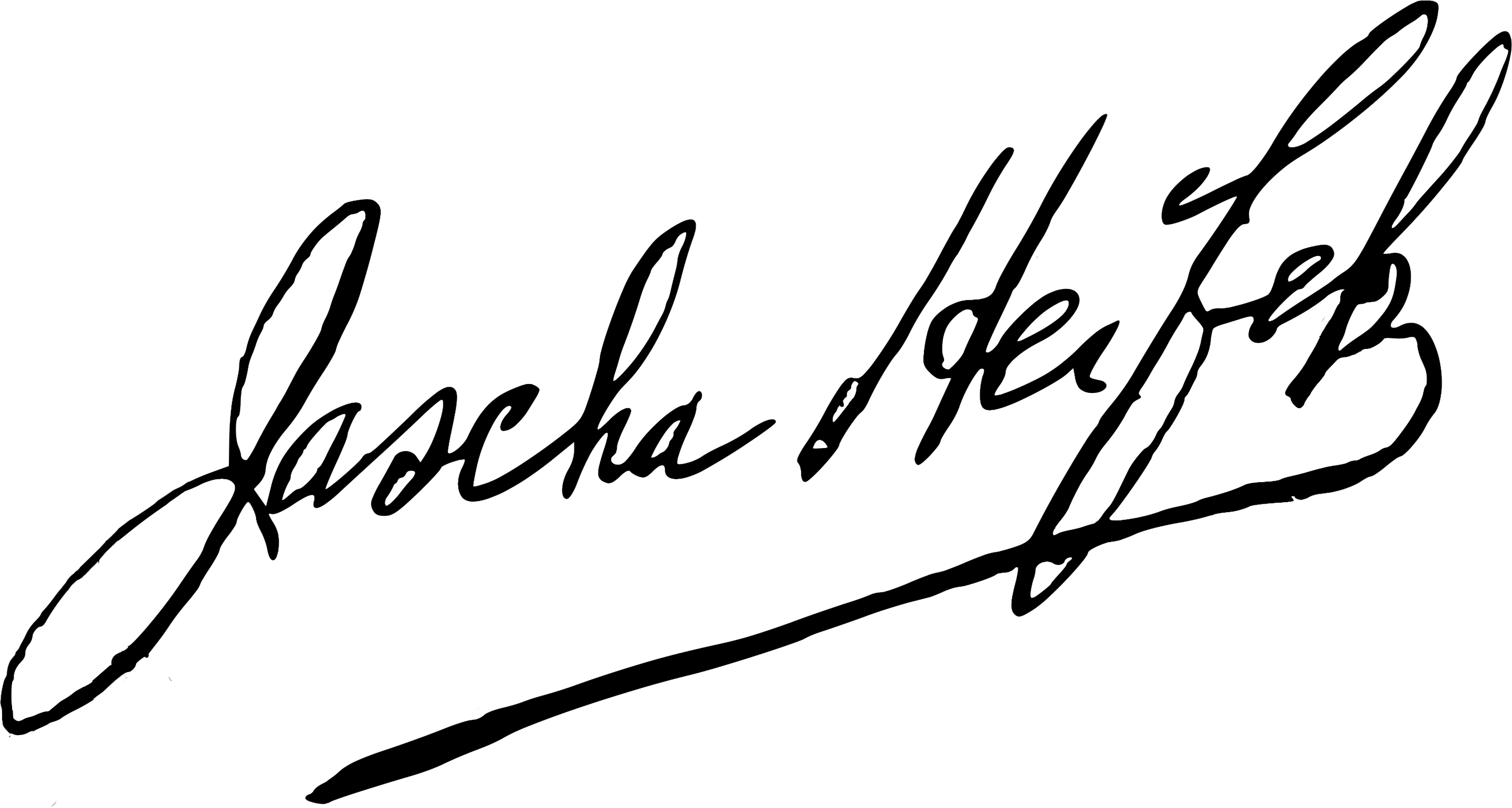

Joseph Ruvimovich Heifetz (Note: Russian: Ио́сиф Руви́мович Хе́йфец, romanized: Iosif Ruvimovich Kheyfets, /ˈhaɪfɪts/.) (2 February [O.S. 20 January] 1901 – December 10, 1987), commonly known as Jascha Heifetz, (Note: Russian: Яша Хейфец, romanized: Yasha Kheyfets.) was a Russian and American violinist, widely regarded as one of the greatest violinists of all time. Born in Vilna, he was soon recognized as a child prodigy and was trained in the Russian violin school in Saint Petersburg. Accompanying his parents to escape the violence of the Russian Revolution, he moved to the United States as a teenager, where his Carnegie Hall debut was rapturously received. Fritz Kreisler, another leading violinist of the 20th century, said after hearing Heifetz's debut, "We might as well take our fiddles and break them across our knees."

By the age of 18, Heifetz was the highest-paid violinist in the world. He had a long and successful concert career, including wartime service with the United Service Organizations (USO). After an injury to his right (bowing) arm in 1972, he switched his focus to teaching.

== Early life ==
Joseph (Iosif) Ruvimovich Heifetz was born into a Jewish family in Vilna in the Russian Empire (present-day Vilnius, Lithuania). (Note: The record confirming his birth on January 20, 1901 (full archival citation – LVIA/728/4/77), is held at the Lithuanian State Historical Archives (LVIA). A copy of the record is held on microfilm by the family history archives of the Church of Jesus Christ of Latter-day Saints in Salt Lake City (No 2205068, image number – 795). The record states the family was registered in Polotsk.) According to his birth register, he was born on 2 February [O.S. 20 January] 1901, although the year has been disputed. A booklet accompanying the 46th volume of The Heifetz Collection (1994) says he was born in 1900, explaining that "Heifetz's mother advanced his birth date one year when no one was looking", though no other reliable sources confirm that his mother changed her son's age.

According to family legend, his paternal grandfather, Ilya Heifetz, was born around 1830 and worked as a teacher (melamed) at a Jewish boys' school (cheder). He lived in Polotsk in Vitebsk Governorate with his family. By the end of the 19th century, Polotsk was the center of an uyezd (district) and had a population of about 20,000, of whom 62% were Jewish. Additional details about Ilya appear on a 1943 document belonging to his son Natan, which notes, "Father: worker (tailor), mother: homemaker".

His father, Reuven (Ruvin) Heifetz, was born on 3 April [O.S. 22 March] 1873, in either Novaya Aleksandriya or Polotsk. He moved from Polotsk to Vilna around 1899. He was a local violin teacher and served as the concertmaster of the Vilna Theatre Orchestra for one season before it closed down. When Jascha was an infant, his father conducted a series of tests to observe how his son reacted to his violin playing. This convinced him that Jascha had exceptional musical potential. Before Jascha turned two, his father purchased a small violin for him and began teaching him basic violin techniques, including bowing and simple fingering.

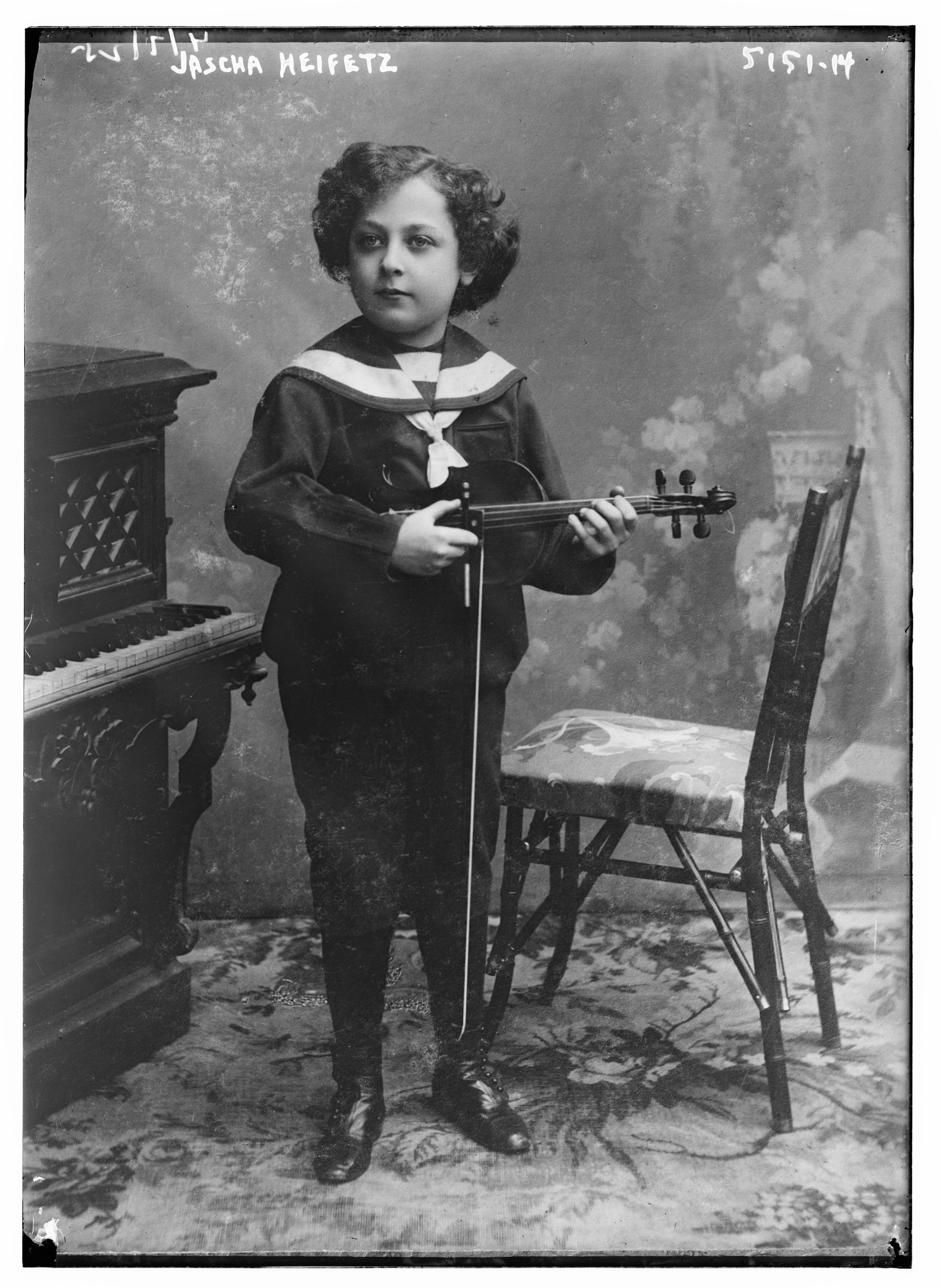
Heifetz in 1910, age nine or ten

In 1906, at the age of five, Heifetz began attending the local music school in Vilna, where he studied under Ilya Malkin. He was recognized as a child prodigy and made his public debut at the age of seven in Kovno (present-day Kaunas, Lithuania), performing the Mendelssohn Violin Concerto. In 1910, he joined the violin class of Ionnes Nalbandian at the Saint Petersburg Conservatory and later studied for six years with the renowned violin teacher Leopold Auer. Heifetz's education under Auer emphasized a rigorous, technical approach that prioritized scales, a clear sound, and mental discipline over natural talent. This experience informed Heifetz's austere performance style.

He played in Germany and Scandinavia and met Fritz Kreisler for the first time in a Berlin private house, in a "private press matinee on May 20, 1912. The home was that of Arthur Abell, the pre-eminent Berlin music critic for the American magazine, Musical Courier. Among other noted violinists in attendance was Fritz Kreisler. After the 12-year-old Heifetz performed the Mendelssohn violin concerto, Abell reported that Kreisler said to all present, 'We may as well break our fiddles across our knees.'"

Heifetz visited much of Europe while still in his teens. In April 1911, he performed in an outdoor concert in Saint Petersburg before 25,000 spectators; there was such a reaction that police officers needed to protect him after the concert. In 1914, he performed with the Berlin Philharmonic conducted by Arthur Nikisch. The conductor said he had never heard such an excellent violinist.

== Career ==
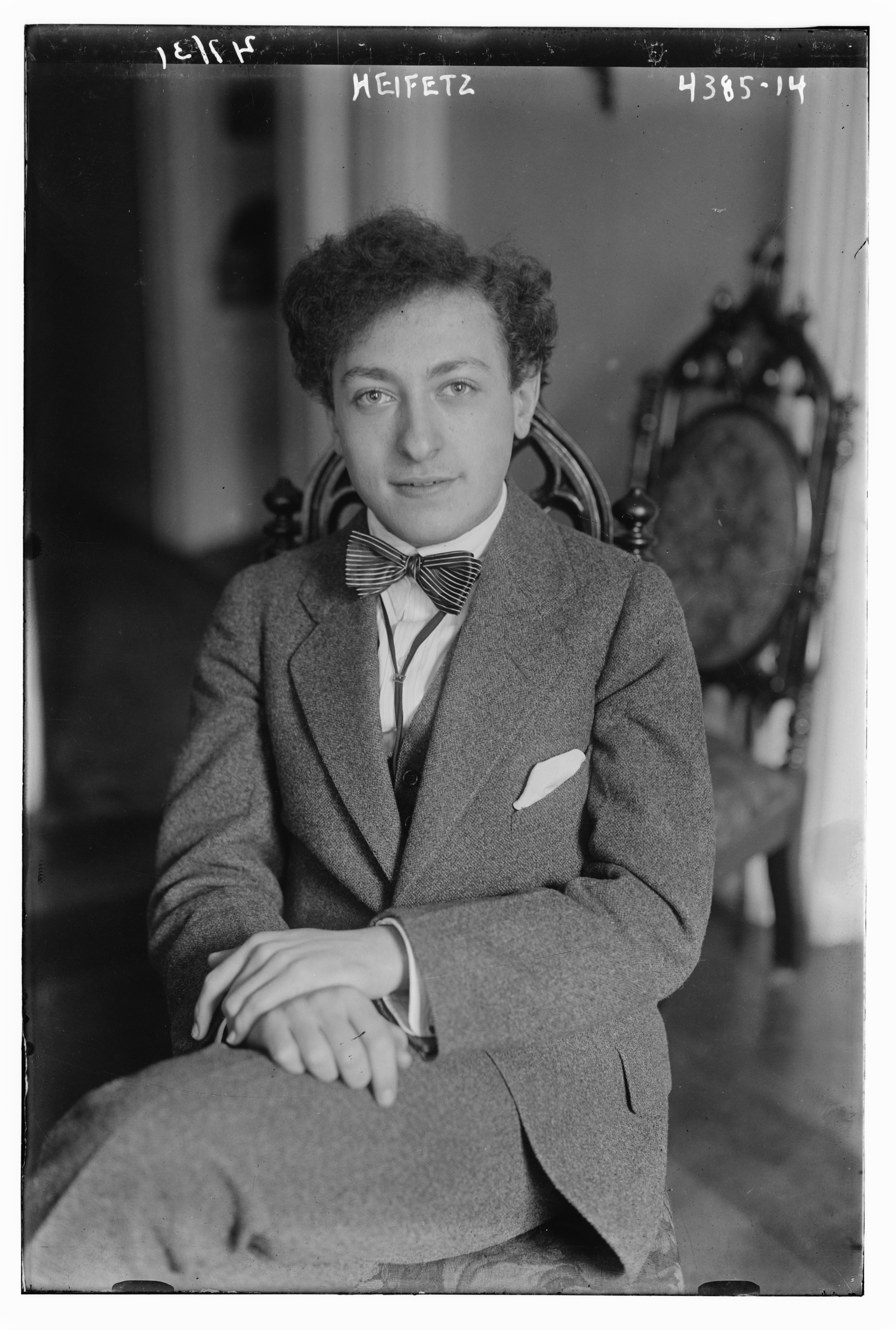
Heifetz in 1917

To avoid the Russian Revolution, Heifetz and his family left Russia in 1917, traveling by rail to the Russian far east and then by ship to the United States, arriving in San Francisco. On October 27, 1917, Heifetz played for the first time in the United States, at Carnegie Hall in New York City, and became an immediate sensation. Fellow violinist Mischa Elman in the audience asked "Do you think it's hot in here?", whereupon the pianist Leopold Godowsky, in the next seat, replied, "Not for pianists."

In 1917, Heifetz was elected an honorary member of Phi Mu Alpha Sinfonia, the national fraternity for men in music, by the fraternity's Alpha chapter at the New England Conservatory of Music in Boston. At 16, he was perhaps the youngest person ever elected to membership in the organization. Heifetz remained in the country and became a United States citizen in 1925. A story circulates that tells of an interaction with one of the Marx Brothers: when he told the brother (usually Groucho or Harpo) that he had been earning his living as a musician since the age of seven, he received the reply, "Before that, I suppose, you were just a bum."

On April 17, 1926, Heifetz performed at Ein Harod, then the center of Mandatory Palestine's kibbutz movement.

In May 1945, Heifetz played with his son for Ivan Konev and Omar Bradley in Kassel.

External audio
- You may hear Jascha Heifetz performing Pyotr Tchaikovsky's Violin Concerto in D Major, Opus 35 with Sir John Barbirolli conducting the London Philharmonic in 1937 Here

In 1954, Heifetz began working with pianist Brooks Smith, who was his accompanist for many years until he changed to Ayke Agus as his accompanist in retirement. He was also accompanied in concert for more than 20 years by Emanuel Bay, another immigrant from Russia and a personal friend. Bay facilitated the commission of Miklós Rózsa's Violin Concerto, which Heifetz premiered in 1956. Heifetz's musicianship was such that he would demonstrate to his accompanist how he wanted passages to sound on the piano, and would even suggest which fingerings to use.

After the seasons of 1955–56, Heifetz announced that he would sharply curtail his concert activity, saying, "I have been playing for a very long time." In 1958, he tripped in his kitchen and fractured his right hip, resulting in hospitalization at Cedars of Lebanon Hospital and a near fatal staphylococcal infection. He was invited to play Beethoven at the United Nations General Assembly and entered leaning on a cane. By 1967, Heifetz had considerably curtailed his concert performances.

=== Technique and timbre ===
Heifetz was "regarded as the greatest violin virtuoso since Paganini", wrote Lois Timnick of the Los Angeles Times. "He set all standards for 20th-century violin playing [...] everything about him conspired to create a sense of awe", wrote music critic Harold C. Schonberg of The New York Times. "The goals he set still remain, and for violinists today it's rather depressing that they may never really be attained again", wrote violinist Itzhak Perlman.

Virgil Thomson described Heifetz as the master of playing "silk underwear music", a characterization he did not intend as a compliment. Other critics argue that he infused his playing with feeling and reverence for the composer's intentions. His style of playing was highly influential in defining the way modern violinists approached the instrument. His use of rapid vibrato, emotionally charged portamento, fast tempi, and superb bow control combined to create a highly distinctive sound that makes Heifetz's playing instantly recognizable to aficionados. Perlman, himself known for his rich tone and expressive use of portamento, described Heifetz's tone as like "a tornado" because of its emotional intensity. He said Heifetz preferred to record relatively close to the microphone—and as a result, one would perceive a somewhat different tone quality when listening to Heifetz during a concert hall performance.

Heifetz was very particular about his choice of strings. He used a silver-wound Tricolore gut G string, plain unvarnished gut D and A strings, and a Goldbrokat medium steel E string, and employed clear Hill-brand rosin sparingly. Heifetz believed that playing on gut strings was important in rendering an individual sound.

=== Early recordings ===
Heifetz made his first recordings in Russia during 1910–11, while still a student of Leopold Auer. The existence of these recordings was not generally known until after Heifetz's death, when several sides, including François Schubert's L'Abeille, were reissued on an LP included as a supplement to The Strad magazine.

On November 9, 1917, shortly after his Carnegie Hall debut, Heifetz made his first recordings for the Victor Talking Machine Company / RCA Victor, where he remained for most of the rest of his career. On October 28, 1927, Heifetz was the starring act at the grand opening of Tucson, Arizona's Temple of Music and Art. For several years in the 1930s, Heifetz recorded primarily for His Master's Voice in the UK because RCA Victor cut back on expensive classical recording sessions during the Great Depression; these discs were issued in the United States by RCA Victor. Heifetz often enjoyed playing chamber music. Various critics have attributed his limited success in chamber ensembles to his overwhelming personality. Collaborations include his 1941 recordings of piano trios by Beethoven, Schubert, and Brahms with cellist Emanuel Feuermann and pianist Arthur Rubinstein as well as a later collaboration with Rubinstein and cellist Gregor Piatigorsky, with whom he recorded trios by Maurice Ravel, Tchaikovsky, and Felix Mendelssohn. Both formations were sometimes referred to as the Million Dollar Trio. Heifetz also recorded some string quintets with violinist Israel Baker, violists William Primrose and Virginia Majewski, and Piatigorsky.

Heifetz recorded the Beethoven Violin Concerto in 1940 with the NBC Symphony Orchestra conducted by Arturo Toscanini, and again in stereo in 1955 with the Boston Symphony Orchestra conducted by Charles Munch. A live performance of an NBC radio broadcast from April 9, 1944, of Heifetz playing the Mendelssohn Violin Concerto with Toscanini and the NBC Symphony has also been released, unofficially.

He performed and recorded Erich Wolfgang Korngold's Violin Concerto at a time when Korngold's scoring of films for Warner Bros. prompted many classical musicians not to consider Korngold a "serious" composer and to avoid his music so as not to be associated with him.

== World War II ==
During World War II, Heifetz commissioned a number of pieces, including the Violin Concerto by William Walton. He also arranged a number of pieces, such as Hora staccato by Grigoraș Dinicu, a Romanian whom Heifetz is rumoured to have called the greatest violinist he had ever heard. Heifetz also played and composed for the piano. He performed mess hall jazz for soldiers at Allied camps across Europe during the Second World War, and under the alias Jim Hoyl he wrote a hit song, "When You Make Love to Me (Don't Make Believe)", which was sung by Bing Crosby.

=== Decca recordings ===
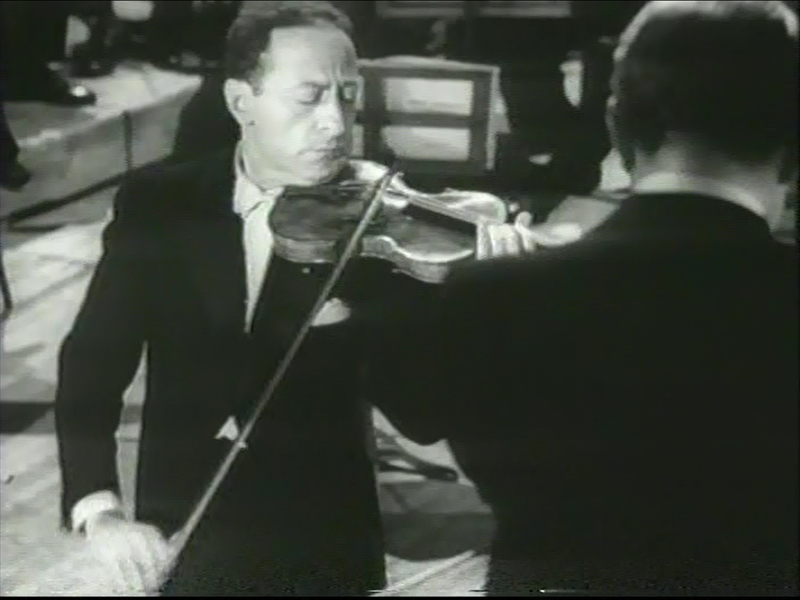
Heifetz, featured in the 1947 Edgar G. Ulmer film Carnegie Hall

From 1944 to 1946, largely as a result of the American Federation of Musicians recording ban (which began in 1942), Heifetz recorded with American Decca because the company settled with the union in 1943, well before RCA Victor resolved its dispute with the musicians. He recorded primarily short pieces, including his own arrangements of music by George Gershwin and Stephen Foster; these were pieces he often played as encores in his recitals. He was accompanied on the piano by Emanuel Bay or Milton Kaye. Among the more uncommon discs featured one of Decca's popular artists, Bing Crosby, in the "Lullaby" from Benjamin Godard's opera Jocelyn and Where My Caravan Has Rested (arranged by Heifetz and Crosby) by Hermann Löhr; Decca's studio orchestra was conducted by Victor Young on a July 27, 1946, session. Heifetz soon returned to RCA Victor, where he continued to make recordings until the early 1970s.

== Later recordings ==
External audio
- You may hear Jascha Heifetz performing Johannes Brahms's Violin Concerto in D Major, Opus 77 with Serge Koussevitzky conducting the Boston Symphony Orchestra in 1939 Here on archive.org

Returning to RCA Victor in 1946, Heifetz continued to record extensively for the company, including solo, chamber, and concerto recordings, primarily with the Boston Symphony Orchestra under Charles Munch and the Chicago Symphony Orchestra under Fritz Reiner. In 2000, RCA released a double CD compilation, Jascha Heifetz – The Supreme. This release provides a sampling of Heifetz's major recordings, including the 1955 recording of Brahms's Violin Concerto with Reiner and the Chicago Symphony Orchestra; the 1957 recording of Tchaikovsky's Violin Concerto with the same forces; the 1959 recording of Sibelius's Violin Concerto with Walter Hendl and the Chicago Symphony Orchestra; the 1961 recording of Max Bruch's Scottish Fantasy with Sir Malcolm Sargent and the New Symphony Orchestra of London; the 1963 recording of Glazunov's A minor Concerto with Walter Hendl and the RCA Victor Symphony Orchestra (drawn from New York musicians); the 1965 recording of George Gershwin's Three Preludes (transcribed by Heifetz) with pianist Brooks Smith; and the 1970 recording of Bach's unaccompanied Chaconne from the Partita No. 2 in D minor.

=== Third Israel tour ===
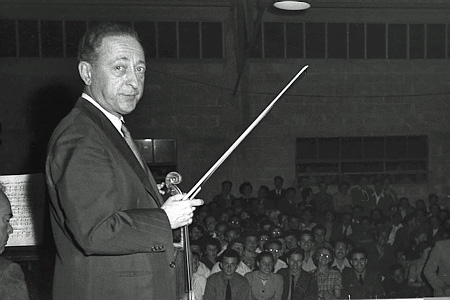
Heifetz in Beersheba, Israel, 1953

On his third tour to Israel in 1953, Heifetz included the Violin Sonata by Richard Strauss in his recitals. At the time, many considered Strauss and a number of other German intellectuals Nazis, or at least Nazi sympathizers, and Strauss's work was unofficially banned in Israel along with that of Richard Wagner. Despite the fact that the Holocaust had occurred less than ten years earlier and a last-minute plea from Ben-Zion Dinur, the Israeli Minister of Education, Heifetz said: "The music is above these factors ... I will not change my program. I have the right to decide on my repertoire." In Haifa, his performance of the Strauss sonata was greeted with applause, but in Tel Aviv it was followed by dead silence.

Heifetz was attacked after his recital in Jerusalem outside his hotel by a young man who struck Heifetz's violin case with a crowbar, prompting Heifetz to use his bow-controlling right hand to protect his priceless violins. The attacker escaped and was never found. The attack has since been attributed to the Kingdom of Israel militant group. The incident made headlines and Heifetz defiantly announced that he would not stop playing the Strauss. Threats continued to come, and he omitted the Strauss from his next recital without explanation. His last concert was canceled after his swollen right hand began to hurt. He left Israel and did not return until 1970.

== Personal life ==
Heifetz married twice. His first wife was silent film actress Florence Vidor, the ex-wife of film director King Vidor. Florence was 33 and Jascha was 27 when they married in August 1928, with the Jewish media commenting that she was a Christian from Texas marrying a Russian Jew. Florence brought her nine-year-old daughter, Suzanne Vidor, into the marriage. The union produced a daughter, Josefa Heifetz, born in 1930, and a son, Robert Joseph Heifetz, born in 1932. Jascha Heifetz filed for divorce at the end of 1945 in Santa Ana, California.

Heifetz married Frances Spiegelberg in January 1947 in Beverly Hills. Frances was a society lady from New York who also had a previous marriage with two children, ending in divorce. Their son Joseph "Jay" Heifetz was born in September 1948 in Los Angeles. Heifetz divorced her in 1963, with temporary alimony ordered by the court in January, and the divorce finalized in December.

Heifetz enjoyed sailing off the coast of Southern California and was a stamp collector. He played tennis and ping-pong and amassed a personal library of books.

== Later life ==
After an only partially successful operation on his right shoulder in 1972, Heifetz ceased giving concerts and making records. His prowess as a performer remained, and he still played privately until the end—but his bow arm was affected, and he could never again hold the bow as high as before.

Late in life, Heifetz was known as a dedicated teacher and a champion of sociopolitical causes. He publicly advocated to establish 9-1-1 as an emergency phone number and crusaded for clean air. He and his students at the University of Southern California protested smog by wearing gas masks, and in 1967, he converted his Renault passenger car into an electric vehicle.

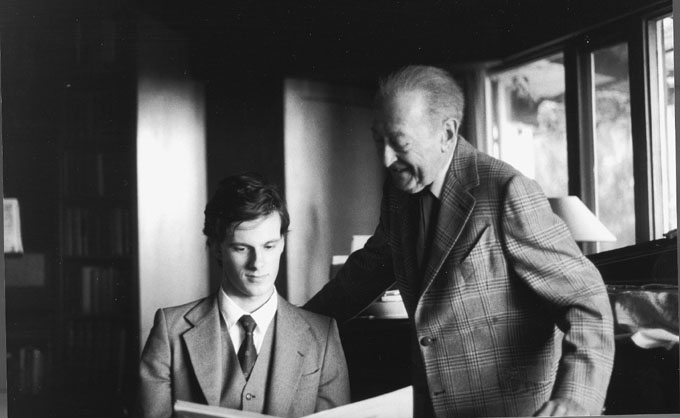
Rudolf Koelman (left) with Heifetz, Los Angeles, 1979

Heifetz taught extensively, holding master classes first at UCLA, then at the University of Southern California, where the faculty included renowned cellist Gregor Piatigorsky and violist William Primrose. For a few years in the 1980s, he also taught in his private studio at home in Beverly Hills. His studio can be seen in the main building of the Colburn School. Heifetz taught, among others, Erick Friedman, Pierre Amoyal, Adam Han-Gorski, Rudolf Koelman, Endre Granat, Teiji Okubo, Eugene Fodor, Paul Rosenthal, Ilkka Talvi, and Ayke Agus.

=== Death ===
Heifetz died at Cedars-Sinai Medical Center in Los Angeles on December 10, 1987, at the age of 86, following a fall in his home.

== Instruments ==
Heifetz owned three Stradivarius violins during his life, including the 1714 Dolphin Stradivarius, the 1731 "Piel" Stradivarius, and the 1734 "Habeneck" made in Cremona. He also owned the 1736 Carlo Tononi, and the 1742 ex David Guarneri del Gesù, the last of which he preferred and kept until his death.

The Dolphin Stradivarius is owned by the Nippon Music Foundation and is on loan to Ray Chen. The Heifetz Tononi violin, used at his 1917 Carnegie Hall debut, was left in his will to Sherry Kloss, his Master-Teaching Assistant, with "one of my four good bows". Kloss wrote Jascha Heifetz Through My Eyes, and is a co-founder of the Jascha Heifetz Society.

The famed Guarneri is now in the San Francisco Legion of Honor Museum, as Heifetz dictated in his will, and may only be taken out and played "on special occasions" by deserving players. The instrument was loaned to the San Francisco Symphony's concertmaster, Alexander Barantschik, who featured it in 2006 with Andrei Gorbatenko and the San Francisco Academy Orchestra. In 1989, Heifetz received a posthumous Grammy Lifetime Achievement Award.

=== Family ===
Heifetz's first child, Josefa, is a lexicographer, the author of the Dictionary of Unusual, Obscure and Preposterous Words. Her married name is Josefa Heifetz Byrne.

Heifetz's second child, Robert, picked up a love of sailing from his father. He taught urban planning at several colleges and universities. He was a peace activist who protested U.S. military intervention around the world and encouraged peace talks between Israel and Palestine. He died of cancer in 2001.

Heifetz's third child, known as Jay, is a professional photographer. He was head of marketing for the Los Angeles Philharmonic and Hollywood Bowl, and the chief financial officer of Paramount Pictures' Worldwide Video Division. He lives and works in Fremantle, Western Australia.

Heifetz's grandson is musician Daniel Mark "Danny" Heifetz, born in 1964, a longtime drummer for several bands, best known for his tenure with Mr. Bungle during 1988–1999.

== Filmography ==
Heifetz played a featured role in the movie They Shall Have Music (1939), directed by Archie Mayo and written by John Howard Lawson and Irmgard von Cube. He played himself, stepping in to save a music school for poor children from foreclosure. He also appeared in the film Carnegie Hall (1947), performing an abridged version of the first movement of Tchaikovsky's Violin Concerto with the orchestra led by Fritz Reiner. In 1951, he appeared in the film Of Men and Music. In 1962, he appeared in a televised series of his master classes, and, in 1971, Heifetz on Television aired, an hour-long color special in which he performed a series of short works: the Scottish Fantasy by Max Bruch, and the Chaconne from Bach's Partita No. 2. Heifetz conducted the orchestra, as the surviving video recording documents.

== Notable instruments ==
- Dolphin 1714 Stradivarius
- Heifetz-Piel 1731 Stradivarius
- Antonio Stradivari 1734
- Carlo Tononi 1736
- Giovanni Battista Guadagnini, Piacenza 1741
- ex-David 1742 Guarneri

== See also ==
- Jascha Heifetz Competition

== Sources ==
- Auer, Leopold, 1923; My Long Life in Music, Frederick A. Stokes Company, New York.
- Kopytova, Galina (November 13, 2013). Jascha Heifetz: Early Years in Russia. Indiana University Press. ISBN 978-0-253-01089-6.
