= Katrin Scholz =

German woman classical violinist

Katrin Scholz (born 13 March 1969) is a German classical violinist.

== Life ==
Born in Kleinmachnow, Scholz visited the Konzerthausorchester Berlin. After finishing school she studied at the Hochschule für Musik "Hanns Eisler" with Werner Scholz and at the conservatory in Bern with Igor Ozim.

Scholz was a soloist with the Berlin Symphony Orchestra, the Dresden Philharmonic, the MDR Radio Symphony Orchestra Leipzig, the German Radio Philharmonic Saarbrücken, the Rundfunk-Sinfonieorchester Berlin, the New Japan Philharmonic and the Yomiuri Nippon Symphony Orchestra. She has worked with the conductors Gerd Albrecht, Vladimir Fedosseyev, Gabriel Feltz, Vladimir Jurowski, Alexander Lazarev, Hannu Lintu, Miguel Ángel Gómez Martínez, Ryosuke Numajiri, Eiji Ōue, Michael Sanderling, Peter Schreier and Ulf Schirmer.

Since 1995 she has also given concerts in double function as conductor and soloist of the Kammerorchester Berlin in European countries as well as in Japan, the US, Brazil, Argentina, Chile, Ecuador, Peru and Colombia.

In October 1998, at the age of 29, Katrin Scholz was appointed full professor at the Hochschule für Künste Bremen.

== Awards ==
- 1st Prize International Music Competition Japan 1989
- 1st Prize International Violin Competition Cologne 1991

== Recordings ==
- 1995: Show Pieces (Sarasate, Saint-Saens, Chausson), JVC Victor Entertainment
- 1995: Brahms: Sonaten 1-3 (Gerald Fauth, Klavier), JVC Victor Entertainment
- 1998: Mozart: Violinkonzerte 1–5, 2 Rondi + Adagio, (Kammerorchester Berlin), Berlin Classics / JVC
- 1999: Franck/Respighi: Sonaten (Gerald Fauth, Klavier), JVC/WDR
- 1999: Spanish Dance (Sarasate, de Falla, Granados, Stschedrin), Gerald Fauth, Klavier, Berlin Classics
- 2000: Saint-Saëns, Martinů: Violinkonzerte Nr. 3+2 (Hamburger Symphoniker, Sebastian Lang-Lessing), Berlin Classics
- 2003: Haydn: alle Violinkonzerte (Kammerorchester Berlin), Berlin Classics
- 2004: Haydn: Doppelkonzert Violine/Cembalo, Abschiedssinfonie, Mozart: Divertimento D, Nachtmusik (Kammerorchester Berlin) Berlin Classics
- 2005: Beethoven/Bruch: Violinkonzerte (Kammerorchester Berlin, Michael Sanderling), Berlin Classics
- 2007: Brahms/Sibelius: Violinkonzerte (Rundfunk-Sinfonieorchester Berlin, Kammerorchester Berlin, Michael Sanderling), Berlin Classis / JVC
- 2008: Bach: Brandenburgische Konzerte 2-5 (Kammerorchester Berlin), JVC / Victor Entertainment
