= Werner Scholz (violinist) =

German violinist

Werner Scholz (7 July 1926 – 1 October 2012) was a German violinist and director of a master class for violin.

== Career ==
Scholz studied in his native city of Dresden with Adrian Rappoldi. From 1948 to 1951, he was concertmaster of the Dresden Philharmonic. From 1951, he was assistant and successor of Gustav Havemann in Cottbus and from 1953 in Berlin. In 1961, he was appointed professor for violin at the Hochschule für Musik "Hanns Eisler". From 1974, he led a master class for violin with outstanding teaching success. In November 1975, he was elected a member of the presidium of the Union of Art board of directors.

== Musical performances ==
For 18 years, from 1956 to 1974, Scholz served as 1st concertmaster of the Konzerthausorchester Berlin. At the same time, he gave concerts as soloist in important music centres of Europe. Through him, numerous works were premiered. He also made recordings for radio and television. He was founder and director of the Berlin Symphony Orchestra and the chamber orchestra of the Hochschule für Musik "Hanns Eisler" Berlin. He has played in chamber music associations with Dieter Zechlin and others (piano), Jürgen Schröder, Alfred Lipka, (alto) and Anton Spieler (cello). He played a decisive role in the development of the international festival of the arts in Hohenlohe and in the Sophie Charlotte Violin Prize of the Association of the Schlossinsel (Mirow).

Scholz died in Berlin at the age of 86.

== Students ==
19 of his students are first concertmasters, e.g. with the Staatskapelle Berlin, the Dresden Staatskapelle, the Vienna Philharmonic, the Berlin Symphony Orchestra; in Chemnitz, Rostock, Aachen, and Würzburg among others.

17 of his students also became professors:

- Vienna: Lothar Strauß
- Berlin: Walter-Karl Zeller, Antje Weithaas, Wolf-Dieter Batzdorf, Michael Erxleben, Joachim Scholz, Axel Wilczok, Kathinka Rebling, Eberhard Feltz
- Dresden: Peter Mirring,
- Weimar: Matthias Wollong
- Bremen: Katrin Scholz
- Rostock: Sylvio Krause
- Aachen: Skerdjano Keraj
- US: Felix Olschofka, David Yonan
- Great-Britain: Ulla Benz

His students won a total of 102 prizes in international competitions, e.g. Rachel Barton, Wolf-Dieter Batzdorf, Thomas Böttcher, Michael Erxleben, Sabine Gabbe, Angela Jaffé, Peter Mirring, Conrad Muck, Marta Murvai, Song Qiang, Amelie-Xiaojun Huang, Thorsten Rosenbusch, Joachim Scholz, Katrin Scholz, Ilja Sekler, Lothar Strauß, Petra Schwieger, Kai Vogler, Antje Weithaas, Iskandar Widjaja, Matthias Wollong, David Yonan (Chicago, US).

== Awards ==
- 1980 Patriotic Order of Merit in Bronze
- 1986 Ehrentitel Verdienter Hochschullehrer der Deutschen Demokratischen Republik
- 1989 National Prize of the German Democratic Republic IIIrd Class for Art and Literatur
