= Matthias Moosdorf =

German cellist and politician (born 1965)

Member of the Bundestag
- Incumbent
- Assumed office 2021

Personal details
- Born: 20 April 1965 (age 60) Leipzig
- Party: Alternative for Germany

Matthias Moosdorf (born 20 April 1965) is a German cellist and politician (Alternative für Deutschland).

== Life ==
=== Music ===
Born in Leipzig, Moosdorf is the son of the Leipzig violinist Otto-Georg Moosdorf. After the Berufsausbildung mit Abitur, he studied at the University of Music and Theatre Leipzig with Jürnjakob Timm, Wolfgang Weber and Gerhard Bosse. In 1991, he passed the Konzertexamen and was an assistant at the Leipzig University of Music until 1996, where he subsequently held a teaching position for violoncello and chamber music until 2006.

Moosdorf was a member of the Leipzig String Quartet from 1988 to 2019, with whom he recorded over 120 CDs and gave guest performances in 60 countries. At the same time, he was principal cellist at the Leipzig Chamber Orchestra from 1991 to 2001. From 2006 to 2014, he played in the "Ex Aequo" trio with Gerald Fauth (piano) and Matthias Wollong (violin), and since 2007 in the Ecco (!) Trio with Moosdorf's wife Olga Gollej (piano) and Karl Leister (clarinet). Until 2018, he was artistic director of the music series "Musique aux Salles de Pologne". He plays on a cello by Andrea Guarneri from 1697.

=== Politics ===
In September 2016, Moosdorf joined the Alternative for Germany party. Within the party, he was initially considered a close confidant of party leader Frauke Petry and her husband Marcus Pretzell, at whose wedding celebration he took part in December 2016. He wrote texts for Petry's blog "Der Blaue Kanal" and acted as an advisor to the AfD parliamentary group in the Saxon state parliament. In March 2017, music critic Arno Lücker reported critically on Moosdorf's political engagement and statements, which Lücker characterised as right-wing populism, in the music blog of the Neue Musikzeitung. After a rift with Petry and Pretzell, Moosdorf turned to the right wing of the party.

Together with Michael Klonovsky he campaigned for the establishment of a party-affiliated foundation of the AfD under the name "Gustav-Stresemann-Stiftung". Since around January 2018, Moosdorf has been a research assistant to the Bavarian AfD member of the Bundestag Martin Hebner. He was one of the first signatories of the Erklärung 2018 against "illegal mass immigration". In August 2018, in a blog commentary, he accused the former pastor of Leipzig's Thomaskirche, Christian Wolff of having "brought on the way from the unspeakable pulpit" that now "[e]very day" doctors were "murdered early in their office hours [...] by migrants" and girls were "raped and killed". A criminal complaint by Wolff against Moosdorf for defamation was not pursued by the Leipzig public prosecutor's office. According to reports by the RedaktionsNetzwerk Deutschland and Die Zeit in November 2018, Moosdorf was the main person responsible for the AfD campaign against the Global Compact for Migration.

“In 2024 Moosdorf accepted a part-time honorary professor position at Gnessin Russian Academy of Music in Moscow.

The school, financed by Russia’s culture ministry, made headlines just days after Russia’s full-scale invasion of Ukraine in 2022, when a staff member performed a concert wearing a black sweatshirt with the letter “Z” on it, which symbolizes support for Moscow's war.

“Music knows no ideological boundaries,” Moosdorf wrote on Facebook, adding that accepting the professorship is “a sign of understanding.”

“I want to give the young people there [in Russia] the feeling that they are not left behind in Europe,” Moosdorf said. He added that he spent three days in Moscow in September to give an inaugural lecture and plans to go back a few days every quarter to teach chamber music”. politico

Moosdorf was charged in December 2025 by Berlin prosecutors for allegedly greeting someone with "a heel click and a Hitler salute" at an entrance to the Reichstag building in June 2023. Moosdorf denied making the salute in a post on X.

== Publication ==
- Ludwig van Beethoven. Die Streichquartette. Bärenreiter 2007, ISBN 978-3-7618-2108-4
