= Dolphin Stradivarius =

Violin made by Antonio Stradivari

The Dolphin Stradivarius or Delfino Stradivarius of 1714 is an antique violin made by Italian luthier Antonio Stradivari of Cremona. This violin was once owned and played by the virtuoso Jascha Heifetz (1901–1987). The owner in the late 19th century, George Hart, who was an instrument dealer in London, named the violin Dolphin as its striking appearance and colouring of its back reminded him of a dolphin.

Provenance

- 1862: purchased by Mr. C. G. Meier for FRF6,500 (GB£260)
- 1868: purchased by George Hart for GB£200.
- unk: purchased by Louis D'Egville
- unk: re-purchased by George Hart.
- 1875: purchased by John Adam for GB£625.
- unk: at the dispersal of the Adams collection, the violin became the property of David Laurie.
- 1882: purchased by Mr. Richard Bennett for GB£1,100.
- 1951: acquired by Jascha Heifetz.
- 21st century: Japanese violinist Akiko Suwanai and Taiwanese-Australian violinist Ray Chen

The Dolphin is currently owned by the Nippon Music Foundation on loan to violinist Timothy Chooi

== See also ==
- Stradivarius
