= Serge Koussevitzky =

Russian and American conductor (1874–1951)

- Сергей Кусевицкий
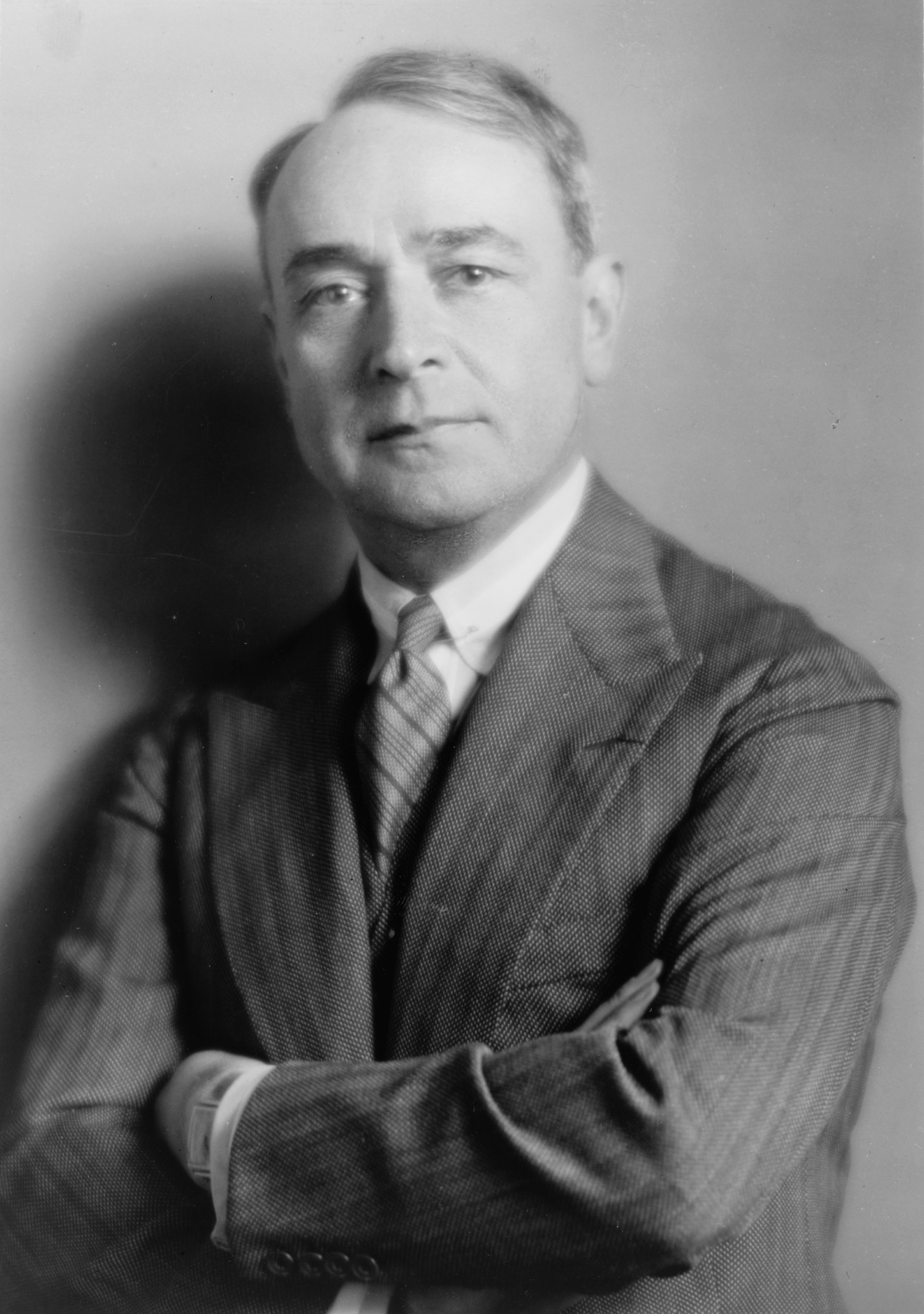
- Koussevitzky between 1920 and 1950
- Born: 26 July 1874; Vyshny Volochyok, Russia
- Died: 4 June 1951 (aged 76); Boston, Massachusetts, U.S.
- Occupations: Conductor; double-bassist; composer

Serge Koussevitzky (born Sergey Aleksandrovich Kusevitsky; (Note: Koussevitzky's original Russian forename is usually transliterated into English as either "Sergei" or "Sergey"; however, he himself adopted the French spelling "Serge", using it in his signature. (See The Koussevitzky Music Foundations official web site. Retrieved 5 November 2009.) His surname can be transliterated variously as "Koussevitzky", "Koussevitsky", "Kussevitzky", "Kusevitsky", or, into Polish, as "Kusewicki"; however, he himself chose to use "Koussevitzky".) Russian: Сергей Александрович Кусевицкий, IPA: [sʲɪrˈɡʲej ɐlʲɪkˈsandrəvʲɪtɕ kʊsʲɪˈvʲitskʲɪj]; 26 July [O.S. 14 July] 1874 – 4 June 1951) was a Russian and American conductor, composer, and double-bassist, known for his long tenure as music director of the Boston Symphony Orchestra from 1924 to 1949.

== Biography ==
=== Early career ===
Koussevitzky was born into a Jewish family of professional musicians in Vyshny Volochyok, Tver Governorate, about 250 kilometres (160 mi) northwest of Moscow, Russia. His parents taught him violin, cello, and piano. He also learned trumpet. At the age of fourteen, he received a scholarship to the Musico-Dramatic Institute of the Moscow Philharmonic Society, where he studied double bass with Rambusek and music theory. He excelled at the bass, joining the Bolshoi Theatre orchestra at the age of twenty, in 1894, and succeeded his teacher, Rambusek, as the principal bassist in 1901. That same year, according to some sources, he made his début (25 March) as a soloist in Moscow, although his biographer Moses Smith states he made his solo début earlier in 1896; he later won critical acclaim with his first recital in Berlin in 1903. In 1902, he married the dancer Nadezhda Galat. The same year, with Reinhold Glière's help, he wrote a popular concerto for the double bass, which he premiered in Moscow in 1905. In 1905, Koussevitzky divorced Nadezhda and married Natalie Ushkova, the daughter of an extremely wealthy tea merchant. He soon resigned from the Bolshoi, and the couple moved to Berlin, where Serge studied conducting under Arthur Nikisch, using his wife's wealth to pay off his teacher's gambling debts.

=== Conductor and publisher ===
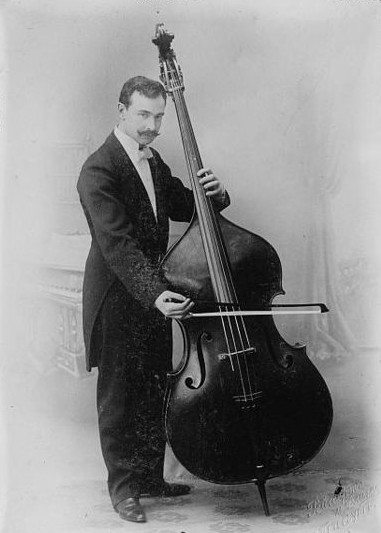
Serge Koussevitsky

In Berlin he continued to give double bass recitals and, after two years practising conducting in his own home with a student orchestra, he hired the Berlin Philharmonic and made his professional début as a conductor in 1908. The concert included Sergei Rachmaninoff's Piano Concerto No. 2, with the composer at the piano. The next year he and his wife returned to Russia, where he founded his own orchestra in Moscow and branched out into the publishing business, forming his own firm, Éditions Russes de Musique, and buying the catalogues of many of the greatest composers of the age. Among the composers published by Koussevitzky were Rachmaninoff, Alexander Scriabin, Sergei Prokofiev, Igor Stravinsky, and Nikolai Medtner. During the period 1909 to 1920, he continued to perform as soloist in Europe, and in Russia he and his orchestra toured towns along the Volga River by riverboat in 1910, 1912, and 1914. The programs included many new works. After the 1917 Russian Revolution, he accepted a position as conductor of the newly named State Philharmonic Orchestra of Petrograd (1917–1920). In 1920, he left Soviet Russia for Berlin and Paris. In Paris he organized the Concerts Koussevitzky (1921–1929), presenting new works by Prokofiev, Stravinsky, and Maurice Ravel. In 1924 he took a post in the United States, replacing Pierre Monteux as conductor of the Boston Symphony Orchestra. However, he continued to return to Paris in the summers to conduct his Concerts Koussevitzky until 1929. In 1941 he and his wife became United States citizens.

=== In America ===
External audio
- Koussevitzky conducting Johann Sebastian Bach's Orchestral Suite No. 3 in D Major BWV 1068 with the Boston Symphony Orchestra at Tanglewood in 1947

Koussevitzky's appointment as conductor of the Boston Symphony Orchestra (BSO) was the beginning of a golden era for the ensemble that would continue until 1949. Over that 25-year period, he built the ensemble's reputation into that of a leading American orchestra. Together with Gertrude Robinson Smith he played a central role in developing the orchestra's internationally acclaimed summer concert and educational programs at Tanglewood, where today the 5,700-seat main performance venue bears his name. In the early 1940s, he discovered a young tenor named Alfred Cocozza (who would later be known as Mario Lanza), and provided him with a scholarship to attend Tanglewood. With the Boston Symphony he made numerous recordings, most of which were well regarded by critics. His students and protégés included Leonard Bernstein, Eleazar de Carvalho, Samuel Adler, and Sarah Caldwell. Bernstein once received a pair of cufflinks from Koussevitzky as a gift, and thereafter wore them at every concert he conducted.

=== Personal life ===
Koussevitzky's first wife was Bolshoi ballet dancer Nadezhda Galat, whom he married at an unknown date probably before 1903; he divorced her in 1905 and married Natalya (Natalie) Ushkov on 8 September of that year.

Koussevitzky's second wife Natalie died in 1942, and he created the Koussevitzky Music Foundations in her honor. In late 1947, he married Olga Naumova (1901–1978), Natalie's niece. Naumova had lived with the couple and acted as their secretary for 18 years. Olga Naumova was the daughter of the distinguished politician and civil servant Aleksandr Naumov (1868, Simbirsk – 1950, Nice, France) who served as Minister of Agriculture in the Russian Imperial Cabinet. She has been described as quiet and soft-spoken, and Leonard Bernstein and Aaron Copland counted her among their close friends.

His nephew, Faviy Adolfovich Koussevitzky, known professionally as Fabien Sevitzky, was music director of the Indianapolis Symphony Orchestra from 1937 until 1955. Sevitzky changed his surname in order to mitigate accusations of nepotism against him.

Koussevitzky died in Boston in 1951 and was buried alongside his wife Natalie at the Church on the Hill Cemetery in Lenox. His pet is buried at the Pine Ridge Pet Cemetery in Dedham.

== Champion of contemporary music ==
Koussevitzky was a great champion of modern music, commissioning a number of works from prominent composers. During his time in Paris in the early 1920s he programmed much contemporary music, ensuring well-prepared and good quality performances. Among the well-received premieres were Arthur Honegger's Pacific 231, George Gershwin's Second Rhapsody, and Albert Roussel's Suite in F.

For the Boston Symphony Orchestra's 50th anniversary, he commissioned Copland's Ode, (Note: Copland failed to complete the work in time for the anniversary: the American premiere was given the following season. Koussevitzky also tried to commission Ravel's Piano Concerto in G; Ravel declined the offer, and the work had its American premieres simultaneously in Boston, under Koussevitzky, and Philadelphia under Leopold Stokowski.) Prokofiev's Symphony No. 4 (which Prokofiev later revised), Paul Hindemith's Concert Music for Strings and Brass, and Stravinsky's Symphony of Psalms, as well as works by Albert Roussel and Howard Hanson. In 1922, Koussevitzky commissioned Maurice Ravel's arrangement of Modest Mussorgsky's 1874 suite for piano, Pictures at an Exhibition, which was premiered on 19 October that year and quickly became the most famous and celebrated orchestration of the work. Koussevitzky held the rights to this version for many years. In 1940, Koussevitzky commissioned Randall Thompson, then a professor at the University of Virginia and director of the men's Glee club, to write a new piece for performance at Tanglewood. Koussevitzky had a large-scale festival piece in mind, but with World War II underway and France having fallen to Germany, Thompson could not find such an inspiration. Instead, he produced his unaccompanied Alleluia – with the word sung 64 times in the Russian manner – which became his most frequently performed work.

== Legacy ==

In 1915, Claude Debussy dedicated the first movement of his En blanc et noir for two pianos to Koussevitzky.

As an avid supporter of new music, Koussevitzky created the Koussevitzky Music Foundations in 1942. The basic aim of the foundations was to assist composers by commissioning new compositions and underwriting the cost of their performance. New works created with the foundations' support include: Benjamin Britten's opera Peter Grimes, Douglas Moore's opera The Ballad of Baby Doe, Béla Bartók's Concerto for Orchestra, Aaron Copland's Symphony No. 3, Henri Dutilleux's string quartet Ainsi la nuit and Olivier Messiaen's Turangalîla-Symphonie.

Following Koussevitzky's 1951 death, his widow, Olga Koussevitzky, presented double-bassist Gary Karr with his double bass, once believed to have been made in 1611 by brothers Antonio and Girolamo Amati. The instrument now bears the names of both Karr and Koussevitzky, and has been played by bassist Scott Pingel and the San Francisco Academy Orchestra.

In 1956, the American composer Howard Hanson, a friend of Koussevitzky, wrote his Elegy for Serge Koussevitzky.

The Tanglewood Music Center awards the Koussevitzky Prize for outstanding student conductor. It has been awarded since 1954, but unlike many prizes, it is not awarded annually. Past winners have included Seiji Ozawa (1960), Russell Peck (1966), and Michael Tilson Thomas (1969).

The Musicians Club of New York, of which Olga Koussevitzky was president from 1962 to 1975, presents the Serge and Olga Koussevitzky Young Artist Awards. Three prizes are awarded annually in categories that rotate between voice, strings, piano, and woodwind/brass. Winners have included Judith Raskin (1956), Jean Kraft (1959), Robert DeGaetano (1969), Paul Neubauer (1982) and François Salque (1994).

== Recordings ==
External audio
- Koussevitzky conducting Jean Sibelius' Symphony No. 2 in D major, Op. 43 with the Boston Symphony Orchestra in 1935

Serge Koussevitzky recorded with the Boston Symphony exclusively for Victor/ RCA Victor, except for a live recording made for Columbia Records, the Symphony 1933 composed by Roy Harris, recorded in Carnegie Hall, New York, during a concert, using portable equipment. One quite notable early RCA Victor session in Boston's Symphony Hall in 1929 was devoted to an early recording of Ravel's Boléro, and his first sessions with the Boston orchestra of Beethoven's Pastoral Symphony and a suite from Stravinsky's Petrushka were recorded in Symphony Hall in 1927.

Some of Koussevitzky's later recordings, including performances of the second suite from Prokofiev's Romeo and Juliet (1945, Symphony Hall, Boston), first symphony (1947, Carnegie Hall, New York, a session that included Mendelssohn's "Italian" Symphony), and fifth symphony (1945, Symphony Hall, Boston), were reportedly mastered on RCA's sound film optical recording process, first employed in this way with the San Francisco Symphony in March 1942.

Koussevitzky's final recordings, made in November 1950, on magnetic tape using RCA's proprietary RT-21 two-track, 1/4-inch machines at 30 inches per second, were acclaimed performances of Sibelius's Second Symphony and Grieg's "The Last Spring". Both have been re-released by RCA on CD in Taiwan. Films of some of Koussevitzky's performances at Tanglewood, including a very spirited Beethoven "Egmont Overture", were made during the 1940s.

Several of the Koussevitzky/ Boston Symphony's 78 rpm recordings with were reissued on LP on the bargain RCA Camden label, originally released at US$1.98 for a 12-inch LP album when premium priced Red Seal records were selling for US$5.98, in the early 1950s as the "Centennial Symphony Orchestra". One of the later albums featured Prokofiev's Peter and the Wolf and Richard Strauss's Till Eulenspiegel's Merry Pranks; while the orchestra was again listed as the Centennial Symphony and the conductor not identified, the narrator, actor Richard Hale, was. Koussevitzky rerecorded the piece in Tanglewood with Eleanor Roosevelt narrating during the summer of 1950 on magnetic tape; originally issued on a ten-inch LP and three 45 rpm records, it has never been reissued officially by RCA in spite of the popularity of the Camden disc with Hale. Hale was also the narrator for Arthur Fiedler's 1953 RCA Victor recording of the same music with the Boston Pops Orchestra. RCA Victor reissued several other historic orchestral recordings on its Camden label with spurious names to avoid having them in direct competition with newer recordings by the same artists on the upscale Red Seal label.

== Notable premieres ==
=== In concert ===
- Alexander Scriabin, Prometheus: The Poem of Fire, Moscow, 2 March 1911
- Maurice Ravel's orchestration of Modest Mussorgsky's Pictures at an Exhibition, Paris, 19 October 1922
- Arthur Honegger's Pacific 231, 1923
- Sergei Prokofiev, First Violin Concerto with Marcel Darrieux as soloist, Paris, 18 October 1923
- Prokofiev, Second Symphony, Paris, 6 June 1925
- Arnold Bax, Symphony No.2, Boston, 13 December 1929
- Prokofiev, Fourth Symphony, Boston, 14 November 1930
- George Gershwin, Second Rhapsody, Boston Symphony Orchestra, Symphony Hall, Boston, 29 January 1932
- Bohuslav Martinů, Symphony No. 1, Boston, 13 November 1942
- David Diamond, Symphony No. 2, Boston, 14 October 1944
- Béla Bartók, Concerto for Orchestra, Boston Symphony Orchestra, Symphony Hall, Boston, 1 December 1944
- Bohuslav Martinů, Symphony No. 3, Boston, 12 October 1945
- Aaron Copland, Appalachian Spring (suite) Boston Symphony Orchestra, 1945
- Samuel Barber, Knoxville: Summer of 1915, Eleanor Steber as soloist, Boston Symphony Orchestra, 1948
- Leonard Bernstein, The Age of Anxiety, Leonard Bernstein as soloist, Tanglewood, 1949

=== On record ===
- Maurice Ravel's orchestration of Mussorgsky's Pictures at an Exhibition, Boston Symphony Orchestra, October 1930
- Jean Sibelius, Seventh Symphony, BBC Symphony Orchestra, His Master's Voice, London, 1933
- Richard Strauss, Also sprach Zarathustra, Boston Symphony Orchestra, 1935
- Roy Harris, Third Symphony, Boston Symphony Orchestra, 1939
- Hector Berlioz, Harold in Italy with William Primrose as soloist, 1946
- Aaron Copland, Appalachian Spring (suite), Boston Symphony Orchestra, 1946

== Notes and references ==
Notes

Cultural offices
Preceded by Hugo Warlich	Musical Directors, State Philharmonic Orchestra of Petrograd; 1917–1920	Succeeded by Emil Cooper
