= Scott Pingel =

American bassist

Scott Pingel is an American bassist who is the principal bassist in the San Francisco Symphony. He had been the principal bassist with the Charleston Symphony Orchestra. In 2011 Pingel had the privilege of performing on the acclaimed Karr-Koussevitzky bass for his solo debut with Andrei Gorbatenko and the San Francisco Academy Orchestra.

Beyond his work with classical music, Pingel has also played jazz. His college bandleader said, "Scott could impress a great jazz bassist like Victor Wooten enough to get him to tutor him over a speaker phone and then turn around and win an orchestral performance fellowship at one of the country’s most prestigious music schools." In fact, Pingel had played with Jazz greats Michael Brecker and Geoff Keezer before becoming a strictly classical musician. Pingel was educated at the University of Wisconsin-Eau Claire where he received his Bachelor of Music degree. He received a Master's Degree in orchestral performance and a professional studies certificate from the Manhattan School of Music on a full scholarship.

== Metallica: S&M2 ==
On September 6 and 8, 2019, as part of the San Francisco Symphony Orchestra, and alongside heavy metal icons Metallica, Pingel participated in the inaugural concert at the newly-opened Chase Center, home to the Golden State Warriors. The concert, entitled S&M^{2}, was a 20th anniversary celebration of the first time the two musical acts combined talents back in 1999, under the direction of the late Michael Kamen. Pingel stunned the audience on both nights of the historic show with a thrilling solo tribute (joined toward the end by Metallica drummer, Lars Ulrich) to Metallica's late and beloved bass player, Cliff Burton.

Pingel was familiar with Burton's style. His older brother was a "big fan" of Metallica that often played Burton's signature solo "Anesthesia (Pulling Teeth)," from the band's debut album, Kill 'Em All. Pingel actually pitched the idea to the band, saying, "I ran through it and they loved it, so I knew I was in the show at that point." Drummer Lars Ulrich said of the composition, "To me, what Scott is doing is the ultimate tribute."
