= Karr-Koussevitzky double bass =

The Karr-Koussevitzky bass

The Karr-Kousevitzky bass or Amati bass is a famous double bass previously belonging to Serge Koussevitzky and Gary Karr. Now generally referred to as the Karr-Koussevitzky rather than the Amati; until the early 2000s, the bass had been attributed to the Amati brothers, but now it is generally believed to have its origins in France. It is renowned for its tonal quality in solo music but is considered to be difficult to play.

The bass has been officially possessed by Koussevitzky, his widow, Karr, and the International Society of Bassists. After Koussevitzky died in 1951, the bass remained in the care of his wife, Olga, until 1962. Olga presented the instrument to Karr after attending one of his recitals. She said that she saw the ghost of her husband embrace him on stage, and took this as a sign to pass the bass on. Karr continued playing the instrument, and it became his main bass for over 40 years until he donated the instrument to the International Society of Bassists, an organization he founded. In 2011, the instrument was featured with bassist Scott Pingel and the San Francisco Academy Orchestra.

The origins of the bass have long been subject to speculation. Although nothing is known of the instrument before 1901, Koussevitzky reported having acquired it from a French dealer. The bass was originally thought to have been made in 1611 by Antonio and Girolamo Amati. However, later studies suggest a French origin and a fabrication date closer to 1800. The studies consider style of construction and feature proportions to identify a region and date; growth ring analysis further confirmed the more recent date.

In November 2015, the Karr-Koussevitzky bass suffered damage during the course of handling on a Southwest Airlines flight, where the neck became detached from the body of the instrument. Bassist Michael Griffin of the Rochester Philharmonic repaired the instrument in time for a performance on the instrument by Colin Corner of the Atlanta Symphony Orchestra.
