= Le piccole storie =

Opera by Lorenzo Ferrero

- Chamber opera by Lorenzo Ferrero
- Librettist: Giuseppe Di Leva
- Language: Italian
- Premiere: 9 December 2007; Teatro Comunale Modena

Le piccole storie, subtitled Ai margini delle guerre, is a one-act chamber opera for young people by Lorenzo Ferrero set to an Italian-language libretto by Giuseppe Di Leva. Some episodes are loosely based on Guy de Maupassant's 1884 short story "Le Lit 29" and on William Shakespeare's play Julius Caesar. The stories do not touch directly upon the subject of war but depict moments in the lives of involuntary victims who subsist, as the subtitle suggests, on the margins of wars.

The work, a commission by the Teatro Comunale Modena, premiered there on 9 December 2007, directed by Francesco Frongia and conducted by Carlo Boccadoro.

== Overview ==
In a violent, disastrous setting in which fragments of war news reports continuously run on TV screens, various historic-literary episodes succeed one another, in which mostly anonymous characters become the innocent victims of war and its devastating psychological effects. Occurrences from the Roman antiquity, the Yugoslav Wars, the Franco-Prussian War, and from Japan at the time of its capitulation in World War II criss-cross each other with short flashes of current events, bringing back the past to our present-day awareness.

Dramaturgically, the opera is conceived as a sort of TV format, in which various TV presenters introduce and comment on the disparate stories, which overlap each other as parts of a single scenario of public and private violence.

== Roles ==
Role	Voice type	Premiere cast, 9 December 2007 (Conductor: Carlo Boccadoro)
The Journalist, TV journalist	actor or real TV journalist	Ferdinando Bruni, Elio De Capitani, Ida Marinelli
The Japanese, businessman	actor-dancer-mime	Beniamino Caldiero
Cinna, Roman poet	baritone	Gabriele Nani
Cinna's slave	mime	Silvia Giuntoli
Georg	actor	Alessandro Mor
Ulrich	actor	Nicola Bortolotti
Irma, singer	soprano	Polina Pasztircsák
Épivent, French hussar officer	tenor	Claudio Barbieri
Robic, French hussar officer	baritone	Gabriele Nani
Plebeians, cigarette seller, waiter, nurse.

== Synopsis ==
Journalistic introduction to war and, in particular, the end of the Second World War. On 15 August 1945 a Japanese businessman comes home and calls long-distance to a friend in Rome. The call is interrupted by a radio broadcast in which Japanese Emperor Hirohito announces the surrender of Japan to the Allies.

Introduction to the assassination of Julius Caesar. Upon awaking, the poet Helvius Cinna recalls having dreamt of receiving an invitation to dinner from Caesar and interprets the dream as an invitation to the dictator's funeral. As a personal friend of Caesar, he feels that it is his duty to go. On the streets, the political climate has changed after the speech Mark Antony delivered at the funeral ceremony and the hunting of Caesar's enemies begins. Cinna is mistaken for one of them, the consul Lucius Cornelius Cinna, and murdered by rioting plebeians.

Introduction of the Yugoslav Wars. One winter night, two ancient enemies meet in a forest in the Balkans, each of them ready for murder. A raging storm uproots an old beech and the men find themselves trapped under the branches of the fallen tree. They strike up a conversation which leads almost to the start of a new friendship. They hear noises and think that their comrades are coming to save them. Together they call for help but it is only the wolves...

Introduction of the Franco-Prussian War. In Rouen two hussars, the captains Épivent and Robic, attend Irma Pavolin's performance in a cabaret. She slips a note to Épivent, inviting him to visit her whenever he finds it convenient. One year later, by this time the two live together in Irma's house, his marching orders arrive and he departs for the front.

Return to the Japanese scene. The businessman reflects upon the Gyokuon-hōsō, Hirohito's radio address, and his eyes fall on his grandfather's sword. With slow, deliberate gestures he pantomimes the action of dressing himself in traditional Japanese clothes and initiating the ancient ritual of seppuku.

Journalistic introduction of the French defeat in the Franco-Prussian War. Épivent returns from battle, highly decorated, and from the weighty insinuations of his comrades learns about Irma's disease. He finds her dying in the syphilis ward at the local hospital. From Irma he hears that she has been violated by the Prussians and that, as the only means of revenge and participation in the war, she decided to contaminate in return as many enemies as possible. In a dramatic dialogue she claims, to the horror of Épivent, the same cross of honour that the captain earned on the battlefield.
