= Alexander Barantschik =

Russian violinist (born 1953)

- Born: 1953 (age 72–73); Leningrad, Soviet Union
- Education: Saint Petersburg Conservatory
- Occupation: Musician

Alexander Barantschik (Russian: Александр Баранчик, romanized: Aleksandr Baranchyk; born 1953) is a Russian-born violinist best known for his association with the San Francisco Symphony, where he serves as its concertmaster since September 2001.

Born in Leningrad (now Saint Petersburg, Russia), after training at the Leningrad Conservatory, he performed with various Soviet orchestras, including the Leningrad Philharmonic Orchestra, before emigrating in 1979 to become concertmaster of the Bamberg Symphony Orchestra. He was concertmaster of the Netherlands Radio Philharmonic from 1982–2001 and leader of the London Symphony Orchestra from 1989-2001. He moved to the United States in 2001 at the request of San Francisco Symphony music director Michael Tilson Thomas.

Barantschik has won various competitions, including the International Violin Competition in Sion, Switzerland, and the Russian National Violin Competition. As a chamber musician, he has performed with Mstislav Rostropovich, Maxim Vengerov, and Yuri Bashmet.

He performs on the c.1742 Guarnerius del Gesù violin that was once owned by Ferdinand David, and Jascha Heifetz. Barantschik has used the instrument in performances with the San Francisco Symphony and the San Francisco Academy Orchestra.
