= Jonathan Nott =

British conductor

Jonathan Nott (born 25 December 1962, in Solihull, England) is an English conductor.

== Biography ==
The son of a priest at Worcester Cathedral, Nott was a music student and choral scholar at St John's College, Cambridge, and also studied singing and flute in Manchester at the Royal Northern College of Music. Nott was also a conducting student in London. He left Britain to develop his conducting career in Germany via the traditional Kapellmeister system.

Nott made his conducting debut in 1988 at the Opera Festival in Battignano, Italy. In 1989, he was appointed Kapellmeister at the Frankfurt Opera. In 1991, he was appointed Erster Kapellmeister at the Hessisches Staatstheater Wiesbaden, and became interim chief conductor for the 1995–96 season. He later became music director at the Lucerne Theatre and served as principal conductor of the Lucerne Symphony Orchestra from 1997 to 2002.

With the Berlin Philharmonic, Nott recorded several orchestral works of György Ligeti as part of the Teldec contribution to the complete recorded works of Ligeti. Nott became music director of the Ensemble InterContemporain (EIC) in 2000. He relinquished this post in 2003, and immediately took up the position of principal guest conductor of the EIC. He stood down as the EIC's principal guest conductor in 2005.

Nott became principal conductor of the Bamberg Symphony in January 2000. With the orchestra, he made his New York City conducting debut. Several years after his 2009 contract extension through the 2011–2012 season, in 2011, Nott and the orchestra agreed on a further extension of his contract with the Bamberg Symphony through the 2015–2016 season. He concluded his Bamberg tenure at the end of the 2015–2016 season. In 2014, he became principal conductor and artistic advisor of the Junge Deutsche Philharmonie.

Nott first guest-conducted the Tokyo Symphony Orchestra in October 2011. Immediately following this engagement, the orchestra offered him its music directorship, which he accepted. The orchestra formally announced Nott's appointment as its next music director in October 2012, effective with the 2014–2015 season, for an initial contract of 3 years, conducting 8 weeks of concerts per season. In September 2015, the orchestra announced an extension of Nott's tenure through the 2025–2026 season. Nott concluded his tenure as the orchestra's music director in March 2026.

In October 2014, Nott made his first guest-conducting appearances with the Orchestre de la Suisse Romande (OSR). Based on these concerts, in January 2015, the OSR named Nott its next music and artistic director, effective January 2017. In February 2021, the OSR announced the conversion of Nott's OSR contract into an evergreen, open-ended lifetime agreement with no set final date. In July 2023, online reports indicated a revised contract end date of 2026 for Nott's post at the OSR. Previously scheduled to stand down from the OSR at the close of the 2025-2026 season, Nott formally concluded his OSR tenure in December 2025.

In July 2025, the Gran Teatre del Liceu announced the appointment of Nott as its next music director, effective with the 2026-2027 season, with an initial contract of five years.

Nott and his wife Helen have three children.

Cultural offices
Preceded by Olaf Henzold	Principal Conductor, Lucerne Symphony Orchestra; 1997–2002	Succeeded by Christian Arming
Preceded by Horst Stein	Principal Conductor, Bamberg Symphony Orchestra; 2000–2016	Succeeded by Jakub Hrůša
Preceded by Hubert Soudant	Music Director, Tokyo Symphony Orchestra; 2014–2026	Succeeded by Lorenzo Viotti
Preceded by Josep Pons	Music Director, Gran Teatre del Liceu; 2026–present	Succeeded by incumbent
