= Kammerorchester Berlin =

Berliner orchestra

The Kammerorchester Berlin has been in existence since 1945 and its first director was the conductor Helmut Koch. Already in the 1950s, the orchestra succeeded in making a name for itself. Among other awards it received the Japanese Record Prize and the Grand Prix du Disque für Vivaldi's Juditha triumphans, L’Orfeo by Claudio Monteverdi and Mozart's Betulia liberata as well as the Goethe-Preis der Stadt Berlin.

In the 1970s, 1980s and early 1990s, the Berlin Chamber Orchestra was associated with the tenor and conductor Peter Schreier, with whom it toured extensively; several LP and CD (from 1958 to 1985 on Eterna Records) and television productions were made. Among other things, all of Johann Sebastian Bach's secular cantatas have been produced for German television. During this time, the orchestra worked with the trumpeter Ludwig Güttler, with Vittorio Negri and the conductors Kurt Masur, Heinz Schunk and Jeffrey Tate.

From 1995 to the present day, the Berlin Chamber Orchestra has worked primarily with the artistic directors Michael Sanderling, Katrin Scholz and Michael Erxleben. Various recordings were made by Edel Berlin Classics. The Berlin Chamber Orchestra has been invited to the Rheingau Musik Festival, the Festspiele Mecklenburg-Vorpommern, the Choriner Musiksommer, the Festival de Música de Canarias and the music festival in Pollença on Mallorca. It has given guest performances worldwide, including in Japan, the USA, Poland, Turkey, Spain, Brazil, Argentina and Chile.

Today the chamber orchestra works with numerous soloists, including Gábor Boldoczki, the pianist Paul Lewis, Saleem Abboud Ashkar, Matt Haimovitz, David Fray and Katrin Scholz. The Berlin Chamber Orchestra performs its own concert series in the Konzerthaus Berlin and the Berliner Philharmonie.
