= Werner Ladwig =

German conductor

Werner Ladwig (18 August 1899 – 23 March 1934) was a German conductor.

== Life ==
Born in Halle, Ladwig visited the Francke Foundations in Halle and studied philosophy, art history and musicology at the universities of Halle and Leipzig. Paul Graener was his teacher in the musical composition class, and Otto Lohse in conducting. His first engagement from 1921 to 1924 was as Kapellmeister and Korrepetitor at the opera in Duisburg. From 1924 on he was for four years state music director in Oldenburg, and from 1929 to 1931 opera director in Königsberg.

Ladwig was a Freemason and from 1929 a member of the KönigsbergLoge Zum Todtenkopf und Phoenix. In 1931 he was appointed music director of the Mecklenburgische Staatskapelle. There, he devoted himself particularly to contemporary music, for example in 1931 with the premiere of Paul Graener's opera Friedemann Bach. In 1932 he conducted the world premiere of Mark Lothar's adaptation of Haydn's Il mondo della luna, which was broadcast by several radio stations. In 1932 he conducted performances of Flotow's opera Alessandro Stradella, Hindemith's Cardillac and Hans Pfitzner's Christelfein. In the same year 1932 he arranged the premiere of Robert Alfred Kirchner's Requiem Opfergang with the Schweriner Gesangverein.

Because of his support for modern music he was denounced as "non-Aryan". For this reason he left Schwerin at the end of 1932 and accepted an appointment as first Kapellmeister of the Dresden Philharmonic.

He died in Dresden at age 34 after two serious operations.

== Literature ==
- Grewolls, Grete (2011). Wer war wer in Mecklenburg und Vorpommern. Das Personenlexikon (in German). Rostock: Hinstorff Verlag. p. 5609. ISBN 978-3-356-01301-6.
