= Iskandar Widjaja =

German classical violinist

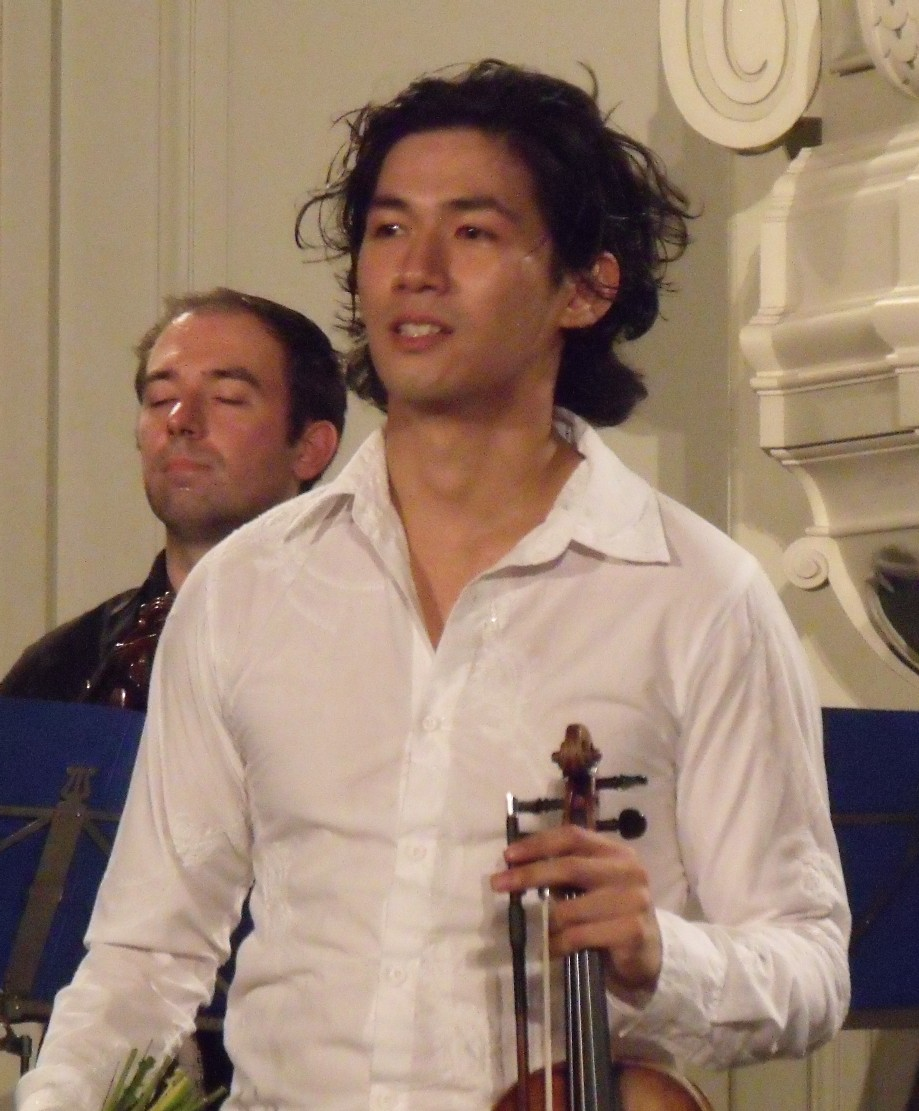
- Iskandar Widjaja after a concert in Berlin (2011)

Background information
- Born: 6 June 1986 (age 40)
- Instrument: Violin

Iskandar Widjaja (born 6 June 1986) is a German violinist and winner of numerous international competitions.

== Life ==
Widjaja was born in Berlin. His grandfather is the Indonesian composer Udin Widjaja, and his parents are Indonesian. Widjaja began playing the violin at the age of four. At the age of eleven, he became a Young Student of Werner Scholz at the Hochschule für Musik "Hanns Eisler" and later of Joachim Hantzschk. In 2003, he moved to the Stern Conservatory of the Berlin University of the Arts to study with Uwe-Martin Haiberg and Ilan Gronich.

Concert tours have taken him to all five continents with the Berlin Philharmonie, the Aula Simfonia Jakarta, the Tel Aviv Opera House, the Hong Kong City Hall. He regularly appears as a soloist with orchestras such as the Sydney Symphony Orchestra, the German Symphony Orchestra and the Konzerthausorchester Berlin, L'Orchestre de la Suisse Romande, and the Warsaw, Munich and Shanghai Philharmonic Orchestras.

In 2013, he performed for the first time in Hong Kong and played at the opening event of the APEC Summit in Bali.

In 2014, he made his debut at the Münchner Philharmoniker conducted by Christoph Eschenbach.

In 2007–2009, Widjaja played on a more than 150 year old violin by Nicolas Darche, which was given to him on loan as a multiple prize winner of the Competition of the German Musical Instrument Fund.

He currently plays a violin by JB Vuillaume, 1875, as well as the Stradivarius "Stephens" 1690, on loan from Florian Leonhardt.

On 29 May 2016, he made his debut at the Berlin Philharmoniker with the Deutsches Symphonie-Orchester Berlin conducted by Christoph Eschenbach.

At the same time, he frequently performs at mass media events such as Miss World or Miss Earth, the Davis Cup, the EXPO in Milan, Fashion Week in Paris or for the world premiere of the Suite for Violin and Orchestra "Across the Stars" from Star Wars by John Williams at the Wiener Konzerthaus.

Iskandar is heavily involved in educational projects for children in the Asia-Pacific region, in collaboration with UNICEF and the WWF (World Wrestling Federation). With KOMPAS Gramedia, Indonesia's largest media group, he organised charities to fund musical instruments and lessons for street children.

In 2018, the DEAG Deutsche Entertainment hosted his first own tour of Germany among others at the Elbphilharmonie Hamburg.

== Honours and awards ==
- 2003: Four-year scholarship to Indiana University Bloomington.
- 2004: First prize at the national Jugend musiziert competition in the violin solo category and 2nd prize at the Queen Sophie Charlotte international competition.
- 2006: Third Prize at the Violin Competition of the Ibolyka Gyarfas Foundation.
- 2008: First prize at the International Hindemith Competition and award of the Paul Hindemith Gold Medal and the Maggini Foundation Prize
- 2008: Gerd Bucerius-Scholarship from the Deutsche Stiftung Musikleben, which enabled him to take part in the International Violin Master Class. "Keshet Eilon" in Tel Aviv with Ida Haendel, Shlomo Mintz and Eduard Dawidowitsch Gratsch.
- 2009: Special prize "Bester Bach" and "Beste Beethoven Sonate" at "Concorso Internazionale Violinistico Andrea Postacchini"
- 2009: First "Goldener Julius" in the "Junior Julius" category for extraordinary talent in violin playing.
- 2013: LOTTO-Förderpreis des Rheingau Musik Festival

== Publications ==
- 2011: Bach 'N' Blues (OehmsClassics Musikproduktion GmbH)
- 2014: Precious Refuge (OehmsClassics Musikproduktion GmbH)
- 2015: Tango Fuego/Trio Cayao (OehmsClassics Musikproduktion GmbH)
- 2018: Schumann Violin Sonate Nr. 2, Fantasie für Violine und Orchester op. 121, Christoph Eschenbach, Deutsches-Symphonieorchester Berlin (OehmsClassics Musikproduktion GmbH)
- 2018: Mercy (Edel/Neue Meister)
- 2019: Fazıl Say, 1001 Nights in the Harem (Sony Classical), Iraz Yildiz, Vienna Radio Symphony Orchestra, Howard Griffiths
- 2020: Iskandar Widjaja - Hip Hop Symphony
