= Otto-Georg Moosdorf =

German violinist and conductor

Otto-Georg Moosdorf (born 19 March 1934 in Bahren) is a German violinist and conductor.

For many years, Moosdorf was a member of the Gewandhaus Leipzig. In 1971, he finally founded the "Leipziger Kammerorchester", consisting of musicians of the Leipzig Gewandhaus, and was thereupon for many years the leader of the orchestra.

In 2006, he also co-founded the chamber orchestra "Capella Via Regia", of which he was an honorary mentor until 2013.

The cellist Matthias Moosdorf is his son.
