= Matthias Wollong =

German violinist

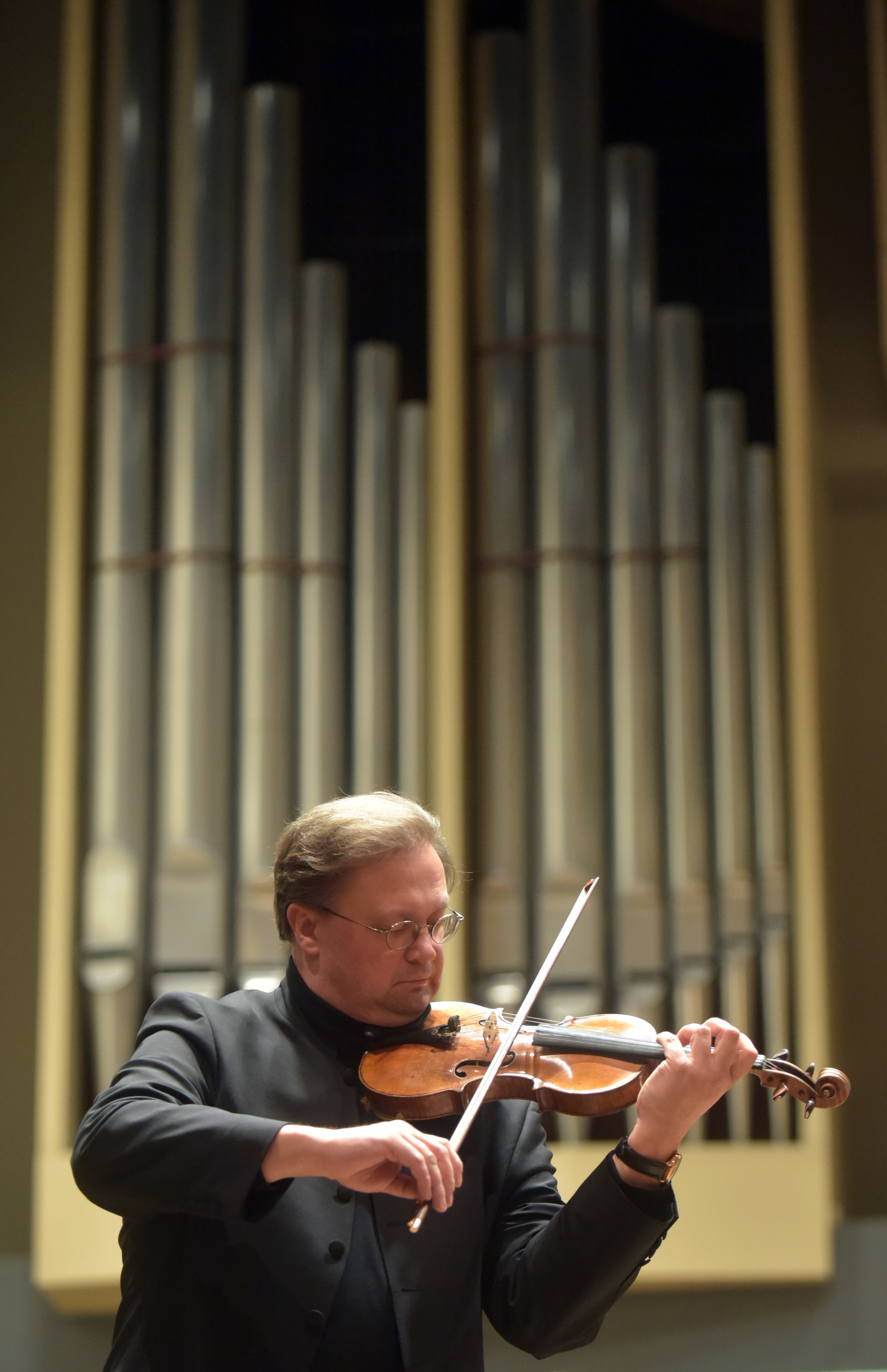
- Matthias Wollong (2016)
- Born: 31 December 1968 (age 57); Berlin, East Germany
- Education: master class of Werner Scholz, study with violinist and pedagogue Tibor Varga
- Occupation: violinist
- Known for: chamber music
- Notable work: concertmaster of the Staatskapelle Dresden

Matthias Wollong (born 31 December 1968) is a German violinist. He is concertmaster of the Staatskapelle Dresden.

== Career ==
Born in Berlin, Wollong began playing the violin at the age of five. After training in the master class of Werner Scholz, he went to Switzerland from 1987 to 1989 to study with violinist and pedagogue Tibor Varga. During this time, he performed as a soloist in the Federal Republic, France and Switzerland. He ended his studies there by winning the violin competition named after his teacher. Further prizes followed, such as the main prize at the "Joseph Joachim" violin competition in Austria.

As a soloist he has worked with the conductors Ádám Fischer, Rafael Frühbeck de Burgos, Marek Janowski, Vladimir Jurowski and Colin Davis and the Vienna Radio Symphony Orchestra, the Berlin Radio Symphony Orchestra, the Staatskapelle Dresden, the Berliner Symphoniker and the Deutsches Nationaltheater und Staatskapelle Weimar.

In his younger years he was a member of the Gustav Mahler Youth Orchestra. Since 1999, Wollong has been 1st concertmaster of the Sächsische Staatskapelle Dresden, after holding the same position with the Rundfunk-Sinfonieorchester Berlin from 1991 to 1999. During the summer months, he plays as 1st concertmaster in the orchestra of the Bayreuth Festival.

Wollong devotes himself intensively to chamber music. He has performed in various formations at the Salzburg Easter Festival and at the International Shostakovich Days Gohrisch. As a chamber musician, he has released radio and CD recordings, such as the complete works for violin by Othmar Schoeck and Wilhelm Furtwängler, the piano trios by Johannes Brahms and Ludwig van Beethoven (Genuin). In 2008 he received an "Echo Klassik" for the recording of chamber music by Erich Wolfgang Korngold.

Since 2003, he has had an ongoing collaboration as conductor and soloist with the European Union Chamber Orchestra, with whom he has toured Europe, the Far East and North and South America.

As a conductor, he has led the German Chamber Orchestra, the Thüringen Philharmonie Gotha-Eisenach and made guest appearances with the Cairo Symphony Orchestra.

Wollong has a professorship at the Hochschule für Musik Franz Liszt, Weimar where he also lives. He plays on a violin by Andrea Guarneri from 1676.

== Recordings ==
Work	Contributors	Label
Alfredo Casella Violinkonzert a-moll op. 48	Michael Sanderling Rundfunk-Sinfonieorchester Berlin	Capriccio
Alfredo Casella Tripelkonzert op 56	Danjulo Ishizaka, violoncello Frank Immo Zichner, piano	Capriccio
Ernest Bloch Konzert für Violine und Orchester	Vladimir Jurowski Rundfunk-Sinfonieorchester Berlin	Capriccio
Salomon Jadassohn Klaviertrio op. 85, Klavierquartett op. 77, Klavierquintett op. 126	Birgitta Wollenweber, piano Matthias Wollong, Jörg Faßmann, violins, Hartmut Rohde, viola Michael Sanderling, violoncello	Real Sound
Erich Wolfgang Korngold Suite op. 23	Trio Parnassus	Musikproduktion Dabringhaus und Grimm
Florent Schmitt Klavierquintett op. 51 À tour d'anches op. 97	Solistenensemble Berlin	Naxos
Gaetano Donizetti La Favorite, arranged for two violins by Richard Wagner	Matthias Wollong, Jörg Faßmann, violins Daniel Morgenroth, narrator	Oehms Classics
Wilhelm Furtwängler Violinsonaten Nr. 1+2	Birgitta Wollenweber, piano	cpo
Othmar Schoeck Sonaten für Violine und Klavier	Patricia Pagny, piano	Musikszene Schweiz, MGB
Johannes Brahms Klaviertrios Nr. 1–3	Trio Ex Aequo	Genuin
Ludwig van Beethoven Klaviertrios op 70 Nr. 1 ("Geistertrio"), op. 121a, op. 1 No. 2	Trio Ex Aequo	Genuin
