= Lucerne Symphony Orchestra =

Swiss orchestra

- Orchestra
- Native name: Luzerner Sinfonieorchester
- Concert hall: Lucerne Culture and Congress Centre
- Principal conductor: Michael Sanderling
- Website: Official website

The Lucerne Symphony Orchestra (German: Luzerner Sinfonieorchester) is a Swiss orchestra based in Lucerne. The Luzerner SInfonieorchester is the orchestra-in-residence of the renowned Lucerne Culture and Congress Centre (KKL Luzern). It also acts as the opera orchestra of the Lucerne Theatre.

== History ==
The precursor ensemble to the Lucerne Symphony Orchestra was founded in 1806, and had the name Allgemeinen Musikgesellschaft Luzern (General Music Society of Lucerne). The orchestra has commissioned new compositions from such composers as David Philip Hefti (Klangbogen) and Wolfgang Rihm (Nähe Fern).

James Gaffigan, chief conductor of the orchestra from 2011 to 2021, made several commercial recordings with the orchestra for Harmonia Mundi.

In 2010, Michael Sanderling first guest-conducted the Lucerne Symphony Orchestra. In November 2019, the orchestra announced the appointment of Sanderling as its next chief conductor, effective with the 2021–2022 season.

== Chief Conductors ==
- Willem Mengelberg (1892–1895)
- Max Sturzenegger (1939–1960)
- Ulrich Meyer-Schoellkopf (1972–1990)
- Marcello Viotti (1987–1992)
- Olaf Henzold (1992–1997)
- Jonathan Nott (1997–2002)
- Christian Arming (2002–2004)
- John Axelrod (2004–2009)
- James Gaffigan (2011–2021)
- Michael Sanderling (2021–present)

== See also ==
- Lucerne Festival Orchestra
- Lucerne Culture and Congress Centre (KKL Luzern)
