= Orchestre Philharmonique de Liège =

Orchestre Philharmonique Royal de Liège
- Orchestra
- Founded: 1960
- Location: Liège, Belgium
- Principal conductor: Gergely Madaras
- Website: www.opl.be

The Orchestre Philharmonique Royal de Liège (OPRL) (English: Liège Royal Philharmonic) is a Belgian symphony orchestra, based in Liège. The primary concert venue and administrative base of the OPRL is the Salle Philharmonique de Liège. The OPRL receives financial support from the Fédération Wallonie-Bruxelles, the City of Liège, the Province of Liège, the Région wallonne (Wallonie Region), and the Loterie Nationale (National Lottery).

== History ==
In 1960, Fernand Quinet, then the director of the Conservatoire de Liège, founded the orchestra as the Orchestre de Liège, with a complement of 71 musicians. Funding was from the city of Liège and the Belgian National Ministry of Education. Quinet served as the OPRL's first music director until 1964. During the music directorship of Paul Strauss, from 1967 to 1977, the orchestra expanded its roster to 89 musicians. The orchestra's longest-serving music director was Pierre Bartholomée, from 1977 to 1999. During the tenure of Bartholomée, the orchestra came under the rubric of the Communauté française, and was renamed the Orchestre Philharmonique de Liège in 1983. In October 2010, the orchestra took on its current name of the Orchestre Philharmonique Royal de Liège.

Under the name of the Orchestre Philharmonique Royal de Liège, Christian Arming was named music director of the OPRL in May 2011, with an initial contract for four years, as of the 2011-2012 season. Following a 2016 extension of Arming's contract through 2019, Arming concluded his tenure as OPRL music director at the close of the 2018-2019 season. In February 2018, the OPRL announced the appointment of Gergely Madaras as its next music director, effective 1 September 2019, with an initial contract of 3 years. Madaras is scheduled to stand down as music director of the OPRL at the close of the 2024-2025 season.

In 2021, Lionel Bringuier first guest-conducted the OPRL. He returned for two subsequent guest-conducting engagements. In January 2024, the OPRL announced the appointment of Bringuier as its next music director, effective with the 2025-2026 season, with an initial contract of 4 years.

The OPRL has notably recorded works of Belgian composers, such as Albert Dupuis, César Franck, Joseph Jongen, Émile Mathieu, and André Souris. The orchestra has recorded commercially for the Naïve and Cyprès record labels.

== Music directors ==
- Fernand Quinet (1960–1964)
- Manuel Rosenthal (1964–1967)
- Paul Strauss (1967–1977)
- Pierre Bartholomée (1977–1999)
- Louis Langrée (2001–2006)
- Pascal Rophé (2006–2009)
- François-Xavier Roth (2009–2010)
- Christian Arming (2011–2019)
- Gergely Madaras (2019–2025)
- Lionel Bringuier (2025–present)
