= George Hart (luthier) =

George Hart (1839 – May 1891) was a violin maker and dealer of London. He was the author of The Violin: Its Makers and its Imitators and The Violin.

His father, John Thomas Hart (17 December 1805 – 1 January 1874), taught him the art and craft of violin making. They had a shop "Hart and Son" at 28 Wardour Street, Leicester Square, London.

He learned to play at the Royal Academy of Music under Sir George Macfarren and from Prosper Sainton.

His son George Hart (4 January 4 1860 – ) was also a violin maker.
