= Christian Arming =

Austrian conductor (born 1971)

Christian Arming (born 18 March 1971, Vienna) is an Austrian conductor.

== Biography ==
Born in Vienna, Arming and his family later resided in Tokyo until Arming was age two. The family relocated to Hamburg, and then returned to Vienna. He sang with the Vienna Boys Choir as a youth. Arming studied at the University of Music and Performing Arts in Vienna, where his conducting teachers included Leopold Hager. Arming was an assistant conductor to Seiji Ozawa and counts Ozawa as a conducting mentor.

Arming's first orchestral post was as chief conductor of the Janáček Philharmonic Orchestra, Ostrava, from 1996 to 2002. He was subsequently chief conductor of the Lucerne Symphony Orchestra from 2002 to 2004. He was music director of the New Japan Philharmonic from 2003 to 2013, the third conductor in the history of the orchestra to have the title of music director. He was music director of the Orchestre Philharmonique de Liège (OPRL) from 2011 to 2019.

Arming and his wife, actress Catherine Le Blanc, have two children.

== Selected discography ==
- Janáček: Taras Bulba / Suite from From the House of the Dead / The Ballad of Blanik - Janáček Philharmonic Orchestra (Arte Nova 74321 67524 2)
- Edward McDowell: Piano Concerto No. 2 / Piano Sonata No. 1 - Leonid Kuzmin, Orchestre National de Montpellier (Universal Music 476 9836)
- Wolfgang Rihm: Verwandlungen - Stuttgart Radio Symphony Orchestra; Christian Arming, Matthias Pintscher, conductors (Hänssler Classic 93.263)
- Robert Schumann: Piano Concerto / Fantasiestücke - Miki Yumihari, Deutsches Symphonie-Orchester Berlin (harmonia mundi Japan)
- Contemporary Clarinet Concertos: Magnus Lindberg, Karl Amadeus Hartmann, Johan Farjot - Jean-Luc Votano, Arnaud Thorette, Antoine Pierlot, Quatuor Danel, Orchestre Philharmonique Royal de Liège (Fuga Libera)
- Heroes: William Walton, Gwenaël Mario Grisi, Sergei Prokofiev - Adrien La Marca, Orchestre Philharmonique Royal de Liège (La Dolce Volta)

Cultural offices
| Preceded by Leoš Svárovský | Chief Conductor, Janáček Philharmonic Orchestra; 1996–2002 | Succeeded by Petr Vronský |
| Preceded by Jonathan Nott | Chief Conductor, Lucerne Symphony Orchestra; 2002–2004 | Succeeded by John Axelrod |
| Preceded by Michiyoshi Inoue | Music Director, New Japan Philharmonic; 2003–2013 | Succeeded by Toshiyuki Kamioka |
