= James Gaffigan (conductor) =

American conductor (born 1979)

James Gaffigan (born August 11, 1979) is an American conductor.

== Biography ==
Gaffigan was born in New York City. Gaffigan's father, Dennis Gaffigan, was a salesman for Procter & Gamble, and his mother, Cheryl Gaffigan, was a school secretary. He attended public school on Staten Island in addition to attending the LaGuardia High School and the Juilliard School Preparatory Division.

Gaffigan studied music at the New England Conservatory of Music and subsequently at the Shepherd School of Music at Rice University, where his teachers included Larry Rachleff. He earned a Master's degree from the Shepherd School in 2003. He subsequently developed an interest in conducting, and studied at the American Academy of Conducting of the Aspen Music Festival and School, where his teachers included David Zinman and Murry Sidlin. He was a conducting fellow at Tanglewood in 2003. In 2004, he was a first-prize recipient at the Sir Georg Solti International Conductors' Competition in Germany.

Gaffigan was assistant conductor of the Cleveland Orchestra from 2003 to 2006. During this period in Cleveland, he also served as music director of the CityMusic Cleveland chamber orchestra from 2005 to 2010. He then was associate conductor of the San Francisco Symphony from 2006 to 2009, during which time he served as artistic director of the orchestra's 'Summer in the City' festival.

In Europe, Gaffigan first guest-conducted the Lucerne Symphony Orchestra in 2008. He returned for a second guest-conducting appearance in June 2009. In January 2010, the orchestra named him its next chief conductor, effective with the 2011–2012 season. In June 2015, his Lucerne contract was extended through the 2021–2022 season. With the Lucerne Symphony Orchestra, Gaffigan has commercially recorded music of Antonín Dvořák and of Wolfgang Rihm for harmonia mundi. In parallel with the announcement of his Lucerne appointment, Gaffigan was named principal guest conductor of the Radio Filharmonisch Orkest (RFO), with a contract for 4 weeks of concerts per season, effective August 2011. In September 2013, he became principal guest conductor of the Gürzenich Orchestra Cologne, the first principal guest conductor in the orchestra's history. In August 2019, the Lucerne Symphony Orchestra announced the conclusion of Gaffigan's chief conductorship of the orchestra at the close of the 2020–2021 season, following Gaffigan's decision to vacate the Lucerne post one year earlier than the time of his most recent contract announcement.

In September 2020, Gaffigan first guest-conducted the Trondheim Symphony Orchestra. In February 2021, the orchestra named Gaffigan its new principal guest conductor, with immediate effect, with an initial contract of two seasons. In June 2021, the Palau de les Arts Reina Sofía announced the appointment of Gaffigan as its next music director, effective September 1, 2021, with an initial contract of 4 years. In January 2022, the Komische Oper Berlin announced the appointment of Gaffigan as its next music director, effective with the 2023–2024 season, with an initial contract of 4 years.

Gaffigan stood down as principal guest conductor of the Radiofilharmonisch Orkest at the close of the 2022–2023 season. In December 2024, the Palau de les Arts Reina Sofía announced that Gaffigan is to stand down as its music director at the close of the 2024–2025 season.

Gaffigan first guest-conducted at Houston Grand Opera in 2011. In November 2025, Houston Grand Opera announced the appointment of Gaffigan as its next music director, effective with the 2027-2028 season, with an initial contract of five seasons. Gaffigan is scheduled to take the title of music director-designate for the 2026-2027 season.

== Personal life ==
Gaffigan has been married three times. His first marriage was to the writer Lee Taylor with whom he had two children. With his second wife, the violinist Camilla Kjøll, he had a son. Both marriages ended in divorce. Gaffigan's third wife is Marta Wasilewicz-Gaffigan, and the couple resides in Berlin.

Cultural offices
Preceded by John Axelrod	Chief Conductor, Lucerne Symphony Orchestra; 2011–2021	Succeeded by Michael Sanderling
Preceded by Roberto Abbado	Music Director, Palau de les Arts Reina Sofía; 2021–2025	Succeeded by Mark Elder
Preceded by Ainārs Rubiķis	Generalmusikdirektor, Komische Oper Berlin; 2023–present	Succeeded by incumbent
