= Teatro Comunale Modena =

Opera house in Modena, Italy

Coordinates: 44°38′48″N 10°55′49″E

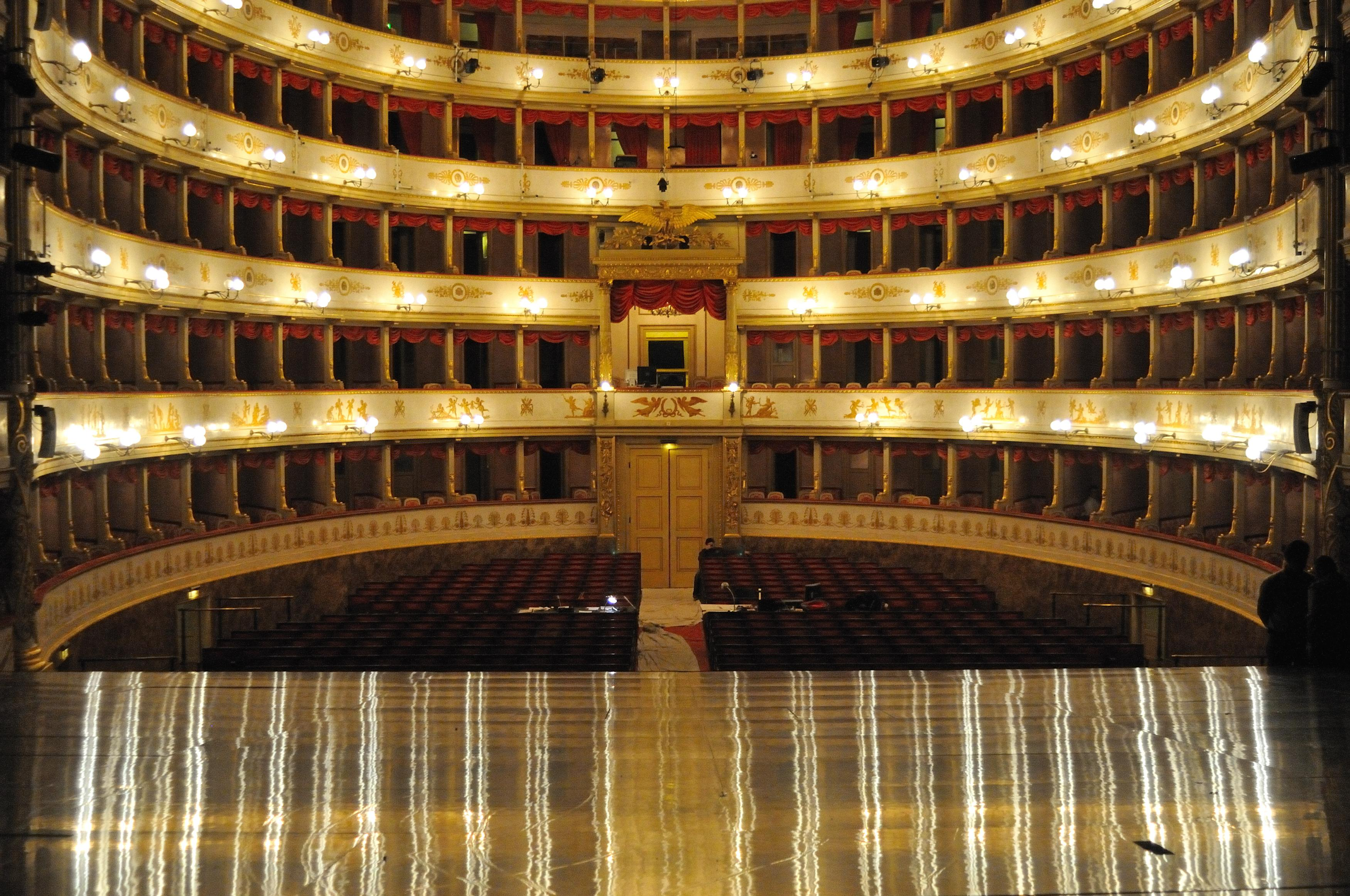
Teatro Comunale di Modena, auditorium

The Teatro comunale di Modena (Community Theatre of Modena, renamed in 2007 as 'Teatro Comunale Luciano Pavarotti' and since 2021 called Teatro comunale Pavarotti-Freni) is an opera house in the town of Modena, (Emilia-Romagna province), Italy. The idea for the creation of the present theatre dates from 1838, when it became apparent that the then-existing 'Teatro Comunale di via Emilia' (in dual private and public ownership) was no longer suitable for staging opera. However, this house had been the venue for presentations of all of the works of Donizetti, Bellini and Rossini up to this time, and a flourishing operatic culture existed in Modena.

Under the mayor of Modena in collaboration with the Conservatorio dell'Illustrissima Comunità (Conservatory of the Most Illustrious Community), architect Francesco Vandelli was engaged to design the 'Teatro dell'Illustrissima Comunità', as the theatre was first called, "for the dignity of the city and for the transmission of the scenic arts". Paid for in the manner typical of the time – from the sale of boxes – in addition to a significant gift from Duke Francis IV (Francesco IV D'Austria Este), Vandelli created a design for the new theatre combining ideas from those in Piacenza, Mantua, and Milan, and it opened on 2 October 1841 with a performance of Alessandro Gandini's Adelaide di Borgogna al Castello di Canossa, an opera specially commissioned for the occasion.

Meanwhile, in 1841, the 'Teatro Comunale di via Emilia' was renamed as the 'Teatro Vecchio' when the present theatre opened, although the 'Vecchio' finally closed in 1859, the same year as Duke Friedrich V left Modena. In turn, this caused another renaming and the 'Illustrissima' became the 'Teatro Municipale'.

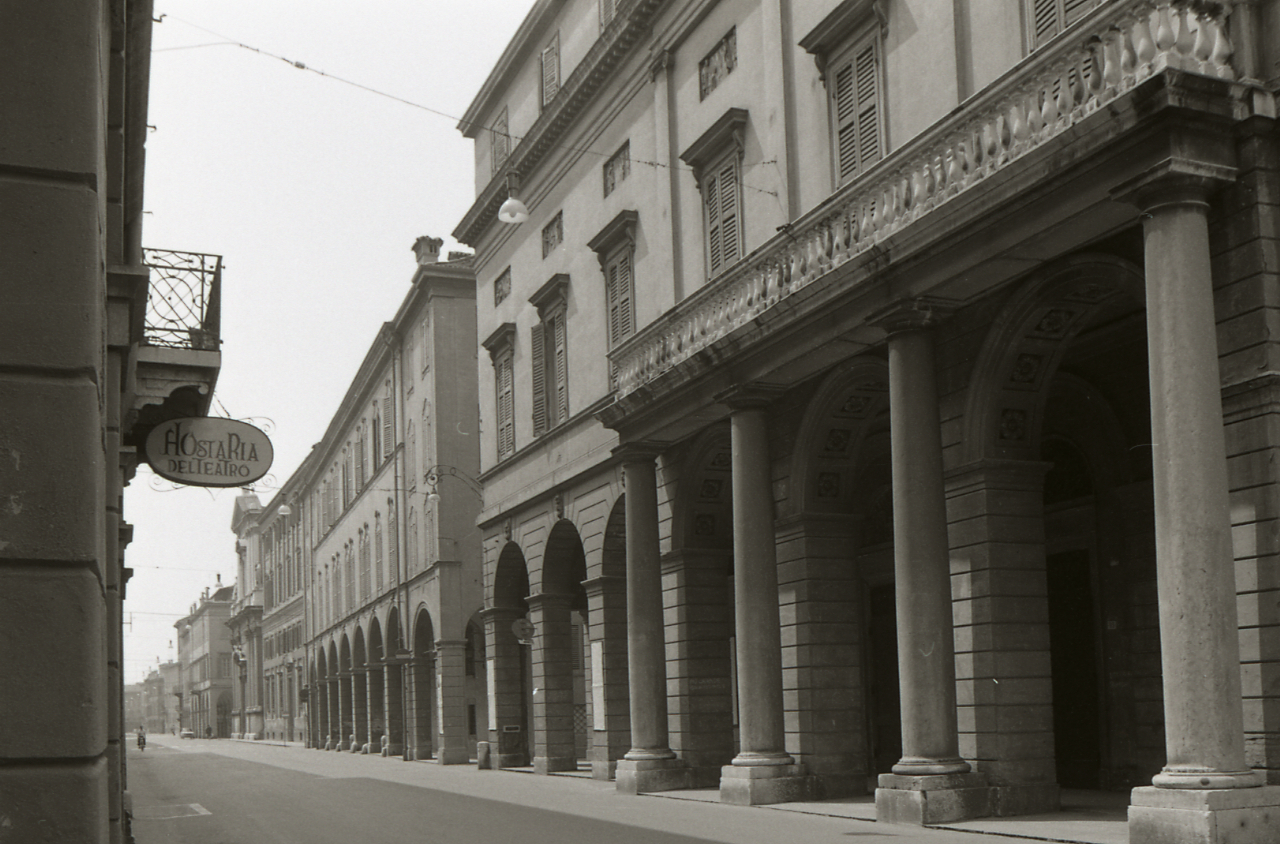
Exterior; photo by Paolo Monti, 1973

During the First World War the theatre was under the control of the army and between 1915 and 1923 it was closed and declared to be unsafe. While opera performances continued to be given elsewhere in the city, it was not until 1935 that a pit was created for the 'Municipale' and, in the last years of the twentieth century, a complete restoration took place.

The now-renamed 'Teatro Comunale' (its original name had been restored in 1956) re-opened in December 1998 as a 900-seat auditorium with 112 boxes on four tiers plus a gallery.

Since its opening in 1841 the 'Comunale' has presented all of the major works of the operatic repertory as well as many new and unfamiliar ones. Today, its programming typically consists of about seven operas presented during the October to April season for two performances each and the theatre is a member of the Association of the Theatres of Emilia-Romagna, thus working cooperatively with opera houses in the region on shared productions.

Following the September 2007 death of world famous opera tenor Luciano Pavarotti, a native of the town and a lifelong resident, the mayor of Modena announced that the theatre was to be renamed for the singer. The name was extended to include Mirella Freni in 2021.

== See also ==
- List of opera houses
