= Andrei Gorbatenko =

Ukrainian-American conductor and educator (born 1977)

Andrei Gorbatenko (born 1977) is a Ukrainian American conductor and educator. He currently serves as music director of the San Francisco Academy Orchestra and has held that post since the year 2000.

Since moving back to his native city of San Francisco in 2000, he has written numerous education programs for the San Francisco Academy Orchestra including an unprecedented graduate program in orchestral studies. The program, designed to be administered by an orchestra rather than a brick and mortar conservatory, focuses on the practical skills necessary to prepare for auditions and a career in orchestral music. Coursework includes weekly lessons, excerpt classes, master classes, mock auditions, and the opportunity to rehearse and perform alongside members of the San Francisco Symphony.

Gorbatenko has a diverse career in music maintaining a schedule of conducting, teaching, recording, touring, and performing as a contrabassist in both orchestral and chamber music capacities.

He collaborated in 2014 Persian traditional music album Beyond Any Form.

== Sources ==
- http://www.sfacademyorchestra.org
- http://www.sfacademyorchestra.org/#!andreigorbatenko/c1g6n
- http://www.sfcv.org/preview/san-francisco-academy-orchestra/sf-academy-orchestra-mentors-its-members
- https://www.antimusic.com/news/10/sep/17Violinist_Axel_Strauss_To_Open_The_San_Francisco_Academy_Orchestras_10th_Season_.shtml
- PRWeb
- https://web.archive.org/web/20110711104518/http://sanfrancisco.going.com/album-2553618%23
