= Michael Sanderling =

German conductor and cellist

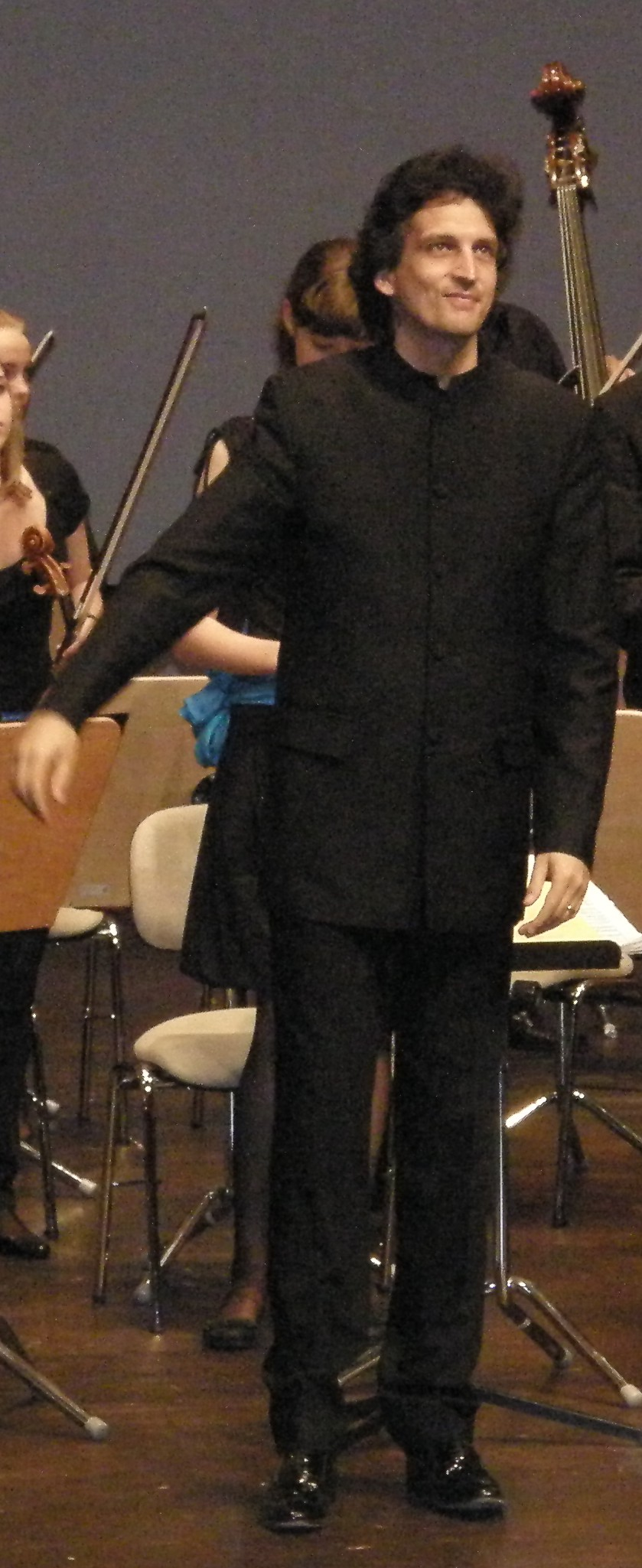
Sanderling in 2011

Michael Sanderling (born 21 February 1967) is a German conductor and violoncellist.

== Biography ==
Born in East Berlin, Michael Sanderling is the son of the contrabassist Barbara Sanderling and the conductor Kurt Sanderling. He received his first cello lessons at age five in Berlin. At age eleven, he became a student of Matthias Pfaender at the Spezialschule für Musik Berlin. The 17-year-old Sanderling was accepted at the Hochschule für Musik Hanns Eisler Berlin and studied with Josef Schwab. He took further lessons with William Pleeth, Yo-Yo Ma, Gary Hoffmann and Lynn Harrell. In 1987, he won a 1st prize at the Maria Canals International Music Competition. The same year, after his debut as a soloist, he was engaged as solo cellist of the Leipzig Gewandhaus Orchestra where he stayed until 1992. From 1994 to 2006, he was guest solo cellist at the Berlin Radio Symphony Orchestra (East Berlin). From 1994 to 1998, he was an academic at his alma mater in Berlin. In 1998, he started teaching at the Frankfurt University of Music and Performing Arts. Between 2000 and 2003, he was also a professor at Hochschule der Künste Bern. He was a member of the Trio Ex Aequo from 1988 to 1996. Sanderling ended his career as a cello soloist in 2010, to focus on teaching and conducting.

Sanderling made his debut as a conductor with the Kammerorchester Berlin on 25 November 2000. In 2003, he became principal conductor of the Deutsche Streicherphilharmonie, and held the post through 2013. From 2006 to 2010, Sanderling was principal conductor and artistic director of the Kammerakademie Potsdam. In 2009, Sony released a CD of works by Dmitri Shostakovich with the Kammerakademie Potsdam and Sanderling.

In 2010, the Dresden Philharmonic appointed Sanderling as its next chief conductor, effective with the 2011–2012 season, with an initial contract of 3 seasons. In October 2013, the orchestra announced the extension of Sanderling's contract as principal conductor through the 2018–2019 season. In November 2016, Sanderling announced, via a letter to the mayor of Dresden, his intention to stand down as chief conductor of the orchestra after the end of his contract in 2019, in protest at learning of proposed culture budget reductions via media reports instead of being informed directly from the civic authorities.

In 2010, Sanderling first guest-conducted the Lucerne Symphony Orchestra. In November 2019, the orchestra announced the appointment of Sanderling as its next chief conductor, effective with the 2021–2022 season.

== Selected discography ==
- Balada: Concerto for Cello and Orchestra No. 2 "New Orleans" – Colman Pearce, Barcelona Symphony & Catalonia National Orchestra (2003, Naxos)
- Shostakovich: Chamber Symphonies – Kammerakademie Potsdam (2008, Sony Music Entertainment)
- Tchaikovsky: The Seasons / Bartók: Transylvanian Dances & Romanian Folk Dances – Deutsche Streicherphilharmonie (2010, Genuine Classics)
- Fauré: Pelléas et Mélisande / Tchaikovsky: Capriccio Italien / Prokofiev: Romeo and Juliet (suite) – Dresdner Philharmonie (2012, Genuine Classics)
- Dvořák: Cello Concerto – Daniel Müller-Schott, NDR Sinfonieorchester (2014, ORFEO)
- Beethoven: Symphonies – Dresdner Philharmonie (2018, Sony Music Entertainment)
- Shostakovich: Symphonies – Dresdner Philharmonie (2019, Sony Music Entertainment)
- Brahms: Symphonies – Lucerne Symphony Orchestra (2023, Warner Classics)

Cultural offices
Preceded by Hanns-Martin Schneidt	Chief Conductor, Deutsche Streicherphilharmonie; 2003–2013	Succeeded by Wolfgang Hentrich
Preceded by Peter Rundel	Chief Conductor and Artistic Director, Kammerakademie Potsdam; 2006–2010	Succeeded by Antonello Manacorda
Preceded by Rafael Frühbeck de Burgos	Chief Conductor, Dresden Philharmonic; 2011–2019	Succeeded by Marek Janowski
Preceded by James Gaffigan	Chief Conductor, Lucerne Symphony Orchestra; 2021–present	Succeeded by incumbent
