= Dresden Philharmonic =

Orchestra based in Dresden

Dresdner Philharmonie
- Orchestra
- official logo since 2019
- Founded: 1870
- Principal conductor: Sir Donald Runnicles
- Website: www.dresdnerphilharmonie.de/de/

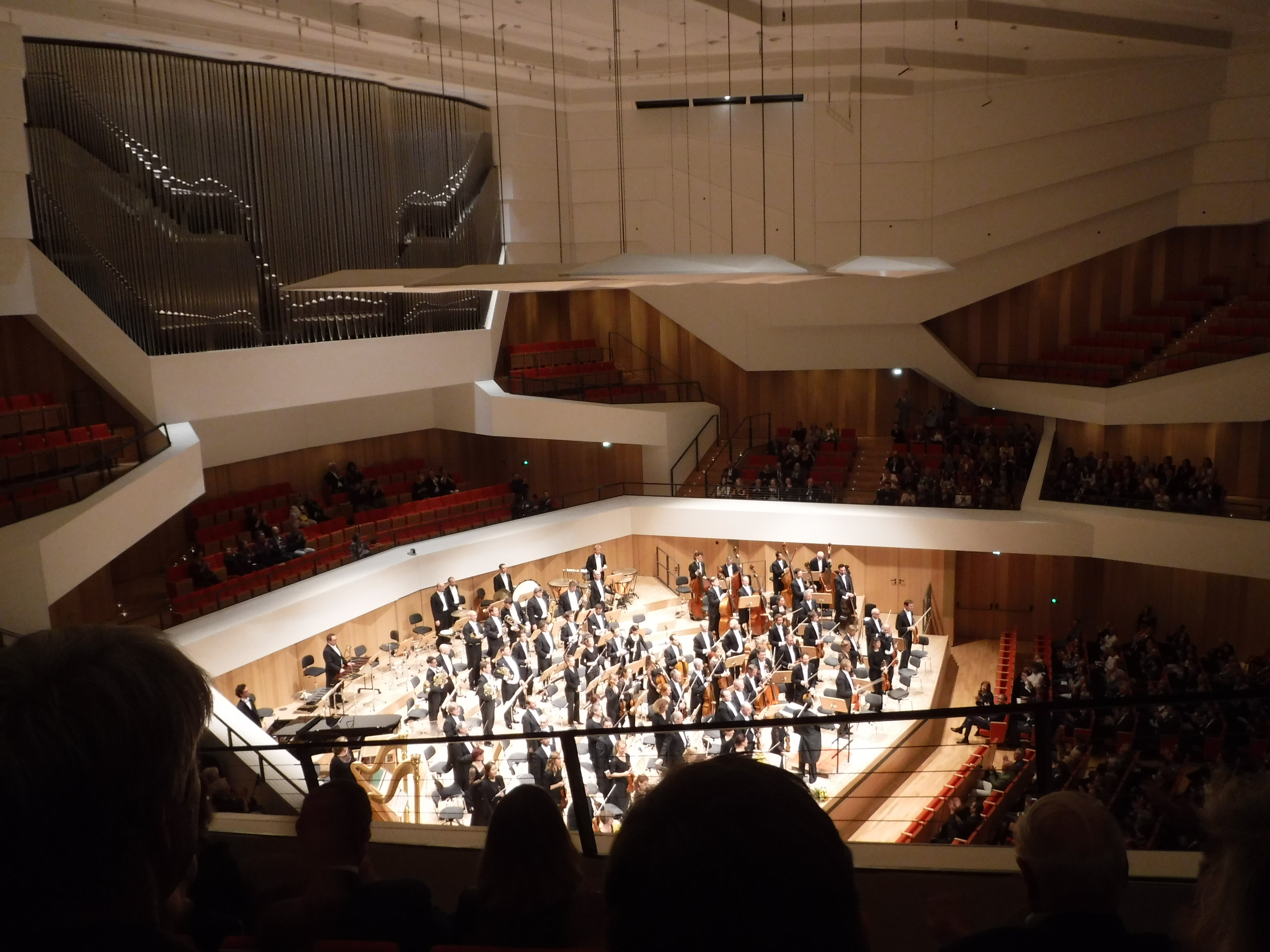
The Dresdner Philharmonie at the renovated Kulturpalast

The Dresdner Philharmonie (Dresden Philharmonic) is a German symphony orchestra based in Dresden. Its principal concert venue is the Kulturpalast. The orchestra also performs at the Kreuzkirche and the Frauenkirche Dresden. It receives financial support from the city of Dresden. The choral ensembles affiliated with the orchestra are the Dresden Philharmonic Choir and Dresden Philharmonic Chamber Choir.

The current Intendantin of the orchestra is Frauke Roth, in the post since 2015, and currently under contract to the orchestra through 2026.

== History ==
The orchestra was founded in 1870 and gave its first concert in the Gewerbehaussaal on 29 November 1870, under the name Gewerbehausorchester. The orchestra acquired its current name in 1915. During the existence of the DDR, the orchestra took up its primary residence in the Kulturpalast. After German reunification, plans had been proposed for a new concert hall. These had not come to fruition by the time of the principal conductorship of Marek Janowski, who cited this lack of development of a new hall for the orchestra as the reason for his resignation from the post in 2003.

Michael Sanderling became principal conductor in 2011, with an initial contract of three years. In October 2013, the orchestra announced the extension of Sanderling's contract as principal conductor through the 2018–2019 season. In November 2016, Sanderling announced, via a letter to the mayor of Dresden, his intention to stand down as chief conductor of the orchestra in 2019, in protest at learning of proposed culture budget reductions via media reports instead of being informed directly from the civic authorities.

In September 2018, the orchestra announced the re-appointment of Janowski as its chief conductor, effective with the 2019–2020 season, with an initial contract of three seasons. In November 2020, the orchestra announced the extension of Janowski's contract as chief conductor by one season, through the summer of 2023, when Janowski concluded his second tenure with the orchestra. In December 2022, Sir Donald Runnicles first guest-conducted the orchestra. In December 2023, the Dresden Philharmonic announced the appointment of Runnicles as its next chief conductor, effective with the 2025–2026 season. He served as chief conductor-designate for the 2024–2025 season.

Past principal guest conductors of the orchestra have included Rafael Frühbeck de Burgos (later chief conductor of the orchestra from 2004 to 2011), Yuri Temirkanov, Bertrand de Billy, Markus Poschner, and Kahchun Wong. In November 2023, Tabita Berglund first guest-conducted the orchestra. In May 2024, on the basis of this appearance, the Dresden Philharmonic announced the appointment of Berglund as its next principal guest conductor, the first female conductor to be named to the post, effective with the 2025–2026 season, for a minimum initial period of two seasons.

In popular culture, the Dresden Philharmonic was the featured orchestra in the film Tár (2022).

== Principal conductors ==
- Hermann Mannsfeldt (1870–1885)
- Michael Zimmermann (1885–1886)
- Ernst Stahl (1886–1890)
- August Trenkler (1890–1903)
- Willy Olsen (1903–1915)
- Edwin Lindner (1915–1923)
- Joseph Gustav Mraczek (1923–1924)
- Eduard Mörike (1924–1929)
- Paul Scheinpflug (1929–1932)
- Werner Ladwig (1932–1934)
- Paul van Kempen (1934–1942)
- Carl Schuricht (1942–1944)
- Gerhart Wiesenhütter (1945–1946)
- Heinz Bongartz (1947–1964)
- Horst Förster (1964–1967)
- Kurt Masur (1967–1972)
- Günther Herbig (1972–1976)
- Herbert Kegel (1977–1985)
- Jörg-Peter Weigle (1986–1994)
- Michel Plasson (1994–2001)
- Marek Janowski (2001–2003)
- Rafael Frühbeck de Burgos (2004–2011)
- Michael Sanderling (2011–2019)
- Marek Janowski (2019–2023)
- Donald Runnicles (2025–present)

== Composers in residence ==
- 2022/2023 Thierry Escaich
- 2023/2024 Lera Auerbach
- 2024/2025 Pascal Dusapin
- 2025/2026 James MacMillan
