= San Francisco Academy Orchestra =

American symphony orchestra in California

The San Francisco Academy Orchestra, founded in 2000, is an American Symphony Orchestra based in San Francisco, California.

== Mission ==
To preserve, promote, and present the art of orchestral performance as a vital form of human expression.

== History ==
Since the year 2000 the above mission has been achieved specifically by offering emerging professionals the opportunity to rehearse and perform alongside members of the San Francisco Symphony. This side-by-side method of pedagogy, which is referred to by Andrei Gorbatenko as the "Academy Experience," has been utilized in 15 uninterrupted seasons of orchestral events with a faculty of San Francisco members as well as internationally acclaimed guest artists.

== Artist diploma in orchestral studies ==
In response to rising tuition costs the San Francisco Academy Orchestra's further meets this mission through the artist diploma program designed to offer an intensive one-year education that focuses solely on the practical skills necessary to prepare for auditions and a career in orchestral music. Coursework includes weekly private instruction, weekly group excerpt classes, master classes, mock auditions, and the opportunity to rehearse and perform alongside members of the San Francisco Symphony. Completion of the curriculum will result in the Academy Orchestra's Artist Diploma in Orchestral Studies and potentially the Academy Prize in recognition of one musician who demonstrates outstanding artistry.

== Music director ==
- Andrei Gorbatenko

== Guest conductors ==
- Kent Nagano
- James Gaffigan

== Sources ==
- 1. http://sfacademyorchestra.wix.com/sfacademyorchestra#!artistdiploma/c1enr
- 2. http://www.sfacademyorchestra.org
- 3. https://www.sfgate.com/entertainment/article/American-Bach-Soloists-semifinalists-ready-to-2518396.php
- 4. http://www.sfcv.org/arts_revs/sfacademy_5_8_07.php
- 5. http://www.sfcv.org/preview/san-francisco-academy-orchestra/sf-academy-orchestra-mentors-its-members
- 6. http://www.nichibei.org/event/sf-kent-nagano-will-conduct-the-san-francisco-academy-orchestra/
