= 2023 in classical music =

This article is for major events and other topics related to classical music in 2023.

== Events ==
- 1 January – At the 2023 Vienna New Year's Concert by the Vienna Philharmonic Orchestra under the direction of Franz Welser-Möst, the Vienna Girls Choir (Wiener Chormädchen) performs in its first-ever appearance in the concert, the first female choir ever to participate in the event. The Wiener Chormädchen also performed at the 30 December 2022 and 31 December 2022 concerts of the same programme.
- 6 January
  - The Staatsoper Unter den Linden announces the resignation of Daniel Barenboim as its Generalmusikdirektor, effective 31 January 2023.
  - Glyndebourne Festival Opera announces that its originally planned 2023 Glyndebourne on Tour season will not occur, as a result of the reduced funding from Arts Council England for the 2023–2026 National Portfolio.
- 9 January
  - The Royal Albert Hall announces the appointment of James Ainscough as its next chief executive director, effective in the late spring of 2023.
  - The Südwestdeutsche Philharmonie Konstanz announces that Insa Pijanka is to stand down as its Intendantin, earlier than the currently scheduled time of her most recent contract extension through 2024.
- 10 January – The Bournemouth Symphony Orchestra announces that Kirill Karabits is to conclude his chief conductorship of the orchestra at the close of the 2023–2024 season.
- 11 January – The Phoenix Symphony Orchestra announces the appointment of Peter Kjome as its next chief executive officer, effective 1 February 2023.
- 12 January – The National Symphony Orchestra announces the appointment of Jean Davidson as its next executive director, effective 1 April 2023.
- 13 January
  - The BBC announces the appointment of Sam Jackson as the new controller of BBC Radio 3, effective April 2023.
  - The new organ of the NOSPR Concert Hall in Katowice is inaugurated with the world premiere of the Sinfonia concertante of Esa-Pekka Salonen, with Iveta Apkalna as the soloist and the NOSPR conducted by the composer.
- 17 January
  - Arts Council England (ACE) announces the presentation to English National Opera (ENO) of a one-year grant of £11.46M for the period of April 2023 – March 2024, following its previous November 2022 announcement of a total withdrawal of ACE's funding to ENO for the period 2023–2026 unless ENO relocates outside of London.
  - The Louisiana Philharmonic Orchestra announces the appointment of Matthew Kraemer as its next music director, effective with the 2023–2024 season.
  - The Hawai'i Symphony Orchestra announces the appointment of Dane Lam as its first-ever music director, effective with the 2023–2024 season, with an initial contract of 5 years.
- 23 January – The Orchestre de chambre de Paris announces the appointment of Jörn Tews as its next general director.
- 25 January
  - The Jerusalem Symphony Orchestra announces the appointment of Julian Rachlin as its next music director, effective with the 2023–2024 season.
  - The Opéra de Marseille announces the appointment of Michele Spotti as its next music director, effective with the 2023–2024 season.
- 28 January – A news report in NRC Handelsblad states that:
  - Lahav Shani is to stand down as chief conductor of the Rotterdam Philharmonic Orchestra at the close of the 2025–2026 season.
  - Shani is subsequently scheduled to take up the post of chief conductor of the Munich Philharmonic Orchestra at the start of the 2026–2027 season.
- 31 January – The Ernst von Siemens Music Foundation announces Sir George Benjamin as the recipient of the 2023 Ernst von Siemens Music Prize.
- 1 February
  - The Hong Kong Sinfonietta announces the appointment of Christoph Poppen as its next music director, effective with the 2023–2024 season.
  - The Munich Philharmonic Orchestra and the Munich City Council officially announce the appointment of Lahav Shani as its next chief conductor, with an initial contract of 5 years.
  - The Théâtre du Châtelet announces the appointment of Olivier Py as its next artistic director.
  - In an interview on Finnish Radio, Sir Mark Elder states that he is to stand down as music director of The Hallé in August 2024, at the close of the 2023–2024 season.
- 3 February – The Royal Concertgebouw Orchestra announces that Ulrike Niehoff is to stand down as its artistic director at the close of the 2022–2023 season.
- 6 February – The Deutsche Oper Berlin announces the appointment of Aviel Cahn as its next Intendant, effective 1 August 2026.
- 7 February
  - The New York Philharmonic announces the appointment of Gustavo Dudamel as its next music director, effective with the 2026–2027 season, with an initial contract of 5 seasons.
  - The Los Angeles Philharmonic announces that Gustavo Dudamel is to conclude his tenure as its music director at the close of the 2025–2026 season.
- 9 February
  - Lausanne Opera announces the appointment of Claude Cortese as its next general director, effective 1 July 2024.
  - Opera Saratoga announces the appointment of Mary Birnbaum as its next general and artistic director, with immediate effect.
- 11 February – Pensacola Christian College cancels a concert appearance by The King's Singers two hours before the scheduled performance time, after objections from a group of students, parents and college staff to the presence of homosexuals in the ensemble.
- 15 February – The Cincinnati May Festival announces that Robert Porco is to conclude his tenure as director of choruses after the 2023–2024 season.
- 16 February – The Royal Conservatory of Music announces the appointment of Alexander Brose as its next president and chief executive officer, effective 1 September 2024.
- 17 February – The Berlin Philharmonic Orchestra announces the appointment of Vineta Sarieka-Völkner as one of its first concertmasters (1.Konzertmeisterin), the first woman ever named to a first concertmaster post with the orchestra.
- 22 February – The Orchestre classique de Montréal announces the appointment of Jacques Lacombe as its next artistic director, effective 1 July 2023, with an initial contract of 5 years.
- 23 February – The Dover Quartet announces the appointment of Juliane Lee as its new violist, effective September 2023.
- 24 February
  - The Hamburg State Opera announces the appointment of Omer Meir Wellber as its next Generalmusikdirektor, effective with the 2025–2026 season.
  - The Sinfonieorchester Basel announces the appointment of Markus Poschner as its next chief conductor, effective with the 2025–2026 season.
- 27 February
  - Alexander Pereira resigns as director of the Maggio Musicale Fiorentino, in the wake of accusations of financial mismanagement.
  - The Florida Orchestra announces the departure of Mark Cantrell as its president and chief executive officer, effective May 2023.
  - The Colorado Symphony announces the appointment of Mark Cantrell as its next chief executive officer, effective 8 May 2023.
- 28 February
  - The Orchestra della Toscana announces the appointment of Diego Cerretta as its next principal conductor, with immediate effect.
  - On Site Opera announces the departure of Eric Einhorn as its general and artistic director at the end of 2023.
- 3 March – The Deutsche Oper am Rhein announces that Axel Kober is to stand down as its Generalmusikdirektor at the close of the 2023–2024 season.
- 6 March – The Orchestra dell'Accademia Nazionale di Santa Cecilia announces the appointment of Daniel Harding as its next music director, effective with the 2024–2025 season, with an initial contract of 5 seasons.
- 7 March – The BBC releases its 2023 Classical Review 2023, whose intended plans include:
  - A reduction in the number of salaried posts in the three BBC England-based orchestras by 20%
  - The closure of the BBC Singers
- 15 March – Universal Music Group announces its purchase of Hyperion Records.
- 22 March – A publication in Current Biology describes analyses of hairs from Ludwig van Beethoven, which indicates hepatitis B as a principal cause of his terminal illness and death.
- 23 March – The Donatella Flick Conducting Competition announces Nicolò Umberto Foron as the winner of the 17th Donatella Flick LSO Conducting Competition.
- 24 March – The BBC announces a reversal of its intended closure of the BBC Singers, following public reactions in protest at the original 7 March 2023 announcement.
- 26 March – The Mozarteum Orchestra Salzburg announces the appointment of Roberto González-Monjas as its next chief conductor, effective with the 2024–2025 season.
- 27 March
  - The City of Birmingham Symphony Orchestra announces the appointment of Emma Stenning as its next chief executive, effective 3 April 2023.
  - Arvo Pärt is announced as one of the three 2023 Polar Music Prize laureates.
- 30 March
  - The city of Cologne announces the appointment of Andrés Orozco-Estrada as the next Generalmusikdirektor (GMD) of the city, which encompasses the Gürzenich Orchestra Cologne and Cologne Opera general director, effective with the 2025–2026 season.
  - A news report in Tagespiegel states that Robin Ticciati is to stand down as principal conductor of the Deutsches Symphonie-Orchester Berlin in 2025, two years ahead of his previously announced contract extension.
- 3 April – New Zealand Opera announces the appointment of Brad Cohen as its next general director.
- 12 April – Opera North announces the appointment of Laura Canning as its next general director, the first woman named to the post, effective December 2023.
- 13 April – The Berlin Philharmonic Orchestra announces its patronage of the Kyiv Symphony Orchestra and of the Youth Symphony Orchestra of Ukraine, with immediate effect.
- 16 April – Vox Urbane performs its inaugural concert at the Asylum Chapel in Peckham, London.
- 18 April
  - On Site Opera announces the appointment of Piper Gunnarson as its next general director and chief executive officer, effective 1 May 2023. In parallel, Eric Einhorn is to stand down as general director ahead of schedule, whilst retaining his title of artistic director through the end of 2023.
  - Artis-Naples announces the appointment of Alexander Shelley as its next artistic and music director, effective with the 2024–2025 season, with an initial contract of four seasons.
- 21 April – Dutch National Opera, the Netherlands Philharmonic Orchestra, and the Netherlands Chamber Orchestra announce that Lorenzo Viotti is to stand down as chief conductor of all three ensembles at the close of the 2024–2025 season.
- 4 May – The Council of Ministers of the government of Italy announces a mandatory retirement age of 70 for non-Italian directors of Italian opera houses.
- 6 May – At the Coronation of Charles III and Camilla, the following new compositions receive their world premieres:
  - Judith Weir – Brighter Visions Shine Afar
  - Karl Jenkins – Crossing the Stone
  - Sarah Class – Sacred Fire
  - Nigel Hess, Roderick Williams, Shirley Thompson – Be Thou My Vision
  - Iain Farrington – Voices of the World
  - Patrick Doyle – King Charles III Coronation March
  - Paul Mealor – Kyrie Eleison (the first composition sung in Welsh at a coronation)
  - Christopher Robinson – The Recognition
  - Debbie Wiseman – Alleluia
  - Andrew Lloyd Webber – Make A Joyful Noise
  - Roxanna Panufnik – Coronation Sanctus
  - Tarik O'Regan – Coronation Agnus Dei
- 9 May – The Kansas City Symphony announces the appointment of Matthias Pintscher as its next music director, effective with the 2024–2025 season, with an initial contract of 5 seasons.
- 15 May
  - The Boston Symphony Orchestra announces the appointment of Chad Smith as its next president and chief executive officer, effective in the autumn of 2023.
  - The Los Angeles Philharmonic announces the departure of Chad Smith as its chief executive, effective in the autumn of 2023.
- 22 May – The Copenhagen Philharmonic announces the appointment of Christoph Gedschold as its next chief conductor, effective with the 2024–2025 season.
- 23 May – The Dallas Symphony Orchestra announces the appointment of Anthony Blake Clark as its next chorus director, effective with the 2023–2024 season.
- 25 May
  - The Lucerne Festival announces the appointment of Sebastian Nordmann as its next Intendant, effective 1 January 2026.
  - The Konzerthaus Berlin and Konzerthausorchester Berlin announce that Sebastian Nordmann is to stand down as their Intendant in 2025.
  - The Paris Opera announces the resignation of Gustavo Dudamel as its music director, effective August 2021, four years ahead of his initial contract.
- 30 May – The RAI National Symphony Orchestra announces the appointment of Andrés Orozco-Estrada as its next principal conductor, effective October 2023, with an initial contract of three seasons.
- 31 May
  - The Guangzhou Symphony Orchestra announces the appointment of Huang Yi as its next music director, effective with the 2023–2024 season.
  - Lincoln Center for the Performing Arts announces the appointment of Jonathon Heyward as the next music director of its resident summer orchestra (formerly known as the Mostly Mozart Festival Orchestra).
- 1 June
  - The Nashville Symphony announces that Giancarlo Guerrero is to conclude his tenure as music director of the orchestra at the close of the 2024–2025 season.
  - The Philharmonia Baroque Orchestra announces that Richard Egarr is to conclude his tenure as its music director at the close of the 2023–2024 season.
- 5 June – The Polish National Radio Symphony Orchestra announces the appointment of Marin Alsop as its next artistic director and chief conductor, the first female conductor named to the posts, effective with the 2023–2024 season,
- 6 June – The BBC announces its new roster of New Generation Artists for the period 2023–2025:
  - James Atkinson (baritone)
  - Alim Beisembayev (pianist)
  - Chaos Quartet
  - Giorgi Gigashvili (pianist)
  - Niamh O’Sullivan (mezzo-soprano)
  - Michael Pandya (collaborative pianist)
  - Johanna Wallroth (soprano)
- 8 June – The Juilliard School dismisses Robert Beaser from its faculty, following an investigation into accusations of sexual misconduct by Beaser towards several Juilliard students.
- 9 June
  - The Vienna Symphony announces the appointment of Petr Popelka as its next chief conductor, effective with the 2024–2025 season, with an initial contract of five seasons.
  - The Norwegian Radio Orchestra announces the conclusion of the tenure of Petr Popelka as its chief conductor at the close of the 2022–2023 season.
  - The Schleswig-Holstein Landestheater announces the appointment of Harish Shankar as its next Generalmusikdirektor (GMD), effective August 2023.
- 13 June – The Florida Orchestra announces the appointment of Ignacio Barrón Viela as its new president and chief executive officer, effective August 2023.
- 16 June
  - The BBC Concert Orchestra announces the appointment of Anna-Maria Helsing as its next chief conductor, the first female conductor to be named to the post and the first female conductor to be named chief conductor of any BBC orchestra, effective 1 October 2023.
  - King's Birthday Honours
    - Kathryn McDowell is made a Dame Commander of the Order of the British Empire.
    - Ivor Bolton and Tasmin Little are each made a Commander of the Order of the British Empire.
    - Lucy Crowe and Nicky Spence are each made an Officer of the Order of the British Empire.
- 17 June – The Antwerp Symphony Orchestra announces that Elim Chan is to stand down as its chief conductor at the close of the 2023–2024 season, one season earlier than her previously announced contract extension through 2025.
- 18 June – BBC Cardiff Singer of the World 2023 competition results:
  - Main Prize: Adolfo Corrado
  - Song Prize: Sungho Kim
  - Audience Prize: Julieth Lozano Rolong
- 20 June – The Hallé announces the appointment of Kahchun Wong as its next principal conductor and artistic advisor, effective with the 2024–2025 season, with an initial contract of 5 seasons.
- 21 June – Seattle Opera announces that Christina Scheppelmann is to stand down as the general director of the company at the close of the 2023–2024 season.
- 22 June
  - The Deutsche Oper am Rhein announces the appointment of Vitali Alekseenok as its next chief conductor, effective with the 2024–2025 season, with an initial contract of 3 seasons.
  - La Monnaie announces the appointment of Christina Scheppelmann as its next general director, effective 1 July 2025, with an initial contract of six years.
  - Renée Fleming is announced as one of the laureates of the 46th Kennedy Center Honors.
- 23 June – The newly formed Chamber Orchestra of Limburg gives its first concert at the Theater De Maaspoort in Venlo, The Netherlands.
- 29 June – National Youth Orchestras of Scotland announce the appointment of Catherine Larsen-Maguire to the newly created post of music director, effective 2024, with an initial tenure of 3 years.
- 13 June – The Tonkunstler Orchestra announces the appointment of Fabien Gabel as its next principal conductor, effective with the 2025–2026 season, with an initial contract of four years.
- 26 June – The San Antonio Philharmonic announces the appointment of Roberto Treviño as its first-ever executive director.
- 4 July – Britten Pears Arts announces that Roger Wright is to stand down as its chief executive in July 2024.
- 5 July – The NDR Radiophilharmonie announces the appointment of Stanislav Kochanovsky as its next chief conductor, effective with the 2024–2025 season, with an initial contract of three seasons.
- 6 July
  - The Royal College of Music announces the appointment of James Williams as its next director, effective 1 September 2024.
  - The Royal Philharmonic Orchestra announces that James Williams is to stand down as its managing director, at the close of the 2023–2024 season.
- 14 July
  - The 2023 Gustav Mahler Conducting Competition announces its prize winners:
    - First prize: Giuseppe Mengoli
    - Second prize: Taichi Fukumura
    - Third prize: Georg Köhler
    - Best conducting of contemporary music: Kevin Fitzgerald
  - The Hofer Symphoniker announces the appointment of Martijn Dendivel as its new chief conductor, the first conductor to be named to the post in over 20 years, effective with the 2024–2025 season, with an initial contract of 4 seasons.
  - At the First Night of the 2023 BBC Proms, Just Stop Oil activists stage an on-stage protest during the concert's interval.
  - At the 2023 Puccini Festival, Alberto Veronesi conducts the first night of the festival's new production of La bohème blindfolded, in protest at the production by Christophe Gayral and Christophe Ouvrard. The festival subsequently dismisses Veronesi from the production several days later.
- 18 July – Symphony in C announces the appointment of Noam Aviel as its next music director, the first female conductor ever named to the post, with immediate effect.
- 20 July – Opera Lafayette announces simultaneously the scheduled departure of Ryan Brown as its artistic director at the close of the 2024–2025 season, and the appointment of Patrick Dupre Quigley as the company's next artistic director, effective with the 2025–2026 season.
- 27 July – Arts Council England announces an additional £24M grant for English National Opera from the period of April 2024-March 2026, with an extended time frame to March 2029 for relocation of the company outside of London.
- 28 July – Hyperion Records announces that it is to make available for streaming access 200 albums from its catalogue, for the first time in the company's history.
- 30 July – The Malta Philharmonic Orchestra announces the suspension of Sergey Smbatyan as its music director with immediate effect, after external accusations of fraud against Smbatyan separate from the orchestra.
- 1 August
  - The world premiere of Trillium X by Anthony Braxton, completed in 2014, takes place at the DOX Centre for Contemporary Art in Prague.
  - The Oregon Symphony announces the appointment of Isaac Thompson as its next president and chief executive officer, effective October 2023.
- 4 August
  - At the district court in Harris County, Texas, David Daniels and his spouse Scott Walters plead guilty to the second-degree felony charge of sexual assault of an adult, following accusations by Samuel Schultz against the couple.
  - The Bellingham Festival of Music announces the appointment of Marcelo Lehninger as its new artistic director, with immediate effect, with an initial contract of 5 years.
- 5 August – At the 2023 Australian Festival of Chamber Music, the Goldner String Quartet announces that it is to disband at the close of the 2023-2024 concert season.
- 7 August – The Salzburg Festival announces Hankyeol Yoon as the winner of the Herbert von Karajan Young Conductors Award for 2023.
- 9 August – The Philippine Philharmonic Orchestra announces the appointment of Grzegorz Nowak as its next music director and principal conductor, with immediate effect.'
- 11 August – The Ulster Orchestra confirms that Daniele Rustioni is to stand down as its music director at the close of the 2023–2024 season.
- 14 August – The BBC announces the sale of its Maida Vale Studios to a consortium that includes Tim Bevan and Eric Fellner of Working Title, and Hans Zimmer and Steven Kofsky.
- 15 August
  - The Metropolitan Opera Guild announces that it is to cease operations and make its staff redundant in the autumn of 2023, with various functions to be absorbed by the Metropolitan Opera and the publication Opera News to be absorbed into the British publication Opera.
  - Opera Philadelphia announces the scheduled departure of David B. Devan as its general director as of 31 May 2024, along with a 20% reduction of its budget for the 2023–2024 season and planned staff redundancies.
- 22 August – After a concert performance of Les Troyens at the Festival Berlioz in La Côte-Saint-André, France, Sir John Eliot Gardiner reportedly strikes bass William Thomas in the face, after erroneous egress from the stage by Thomas.
- 31 August – Sir John Eliot Gardiner announces his withdrawal from his remaining 2023 concert engagements to seek psychological treatment, following his striking of bass William Thomas on 22 August at the Festival Berlioz in La Côte-Saint-André, France.
- 1 September – The Deutsche Oper Berlin announces that Sir Donald Runnicles is to stand down as its Generalmusikdirektor at the close of the 2025–2026 season, one season earlier than his most recent contract extension, at Runnicles' own request.
- 5 September
  - Robert von Bahr announces the sale of his recording label BIS to Apple Music.
  - Pyranello announces the appointment of Julian Schneeman as its new artistic leader.
- 6 September
  - The Bern Symphony Orchestra announces the appointment of Krzysztof Urbański as its next chief conductor, effective with the 2024–2025 season, with an initial contract of three seasons.
  - The Vienna Volksoper announces simultaneously the scheduled departure of Omer Meir Wellber as its music director on 31 December 2023, and the appointment of Ben Glassberg as its new music director effective 1 January 2024.
- 13 September
  - News reports reveal the new name of the Sage Gateshead complex as The Glasshouse International Centre for Music.
  - The Irving S. Gilmore International Piano Festival announces Alexandre Kantorow as the recipient of its 2024 GIlmore Artist Award.
  - Lyric Opera of Chicago announces that Anthony Freud is to stand down as its general director, president and chief executive officer at the close of the 2023–2024 season.
- 18 September
  - The San Francisco Symphony announces the appointment of Jenny Wong as the next director of the San Francisco Symphony Chorus, with immediate effect.
  - The Kitchener-Waterloo Symphony announces the cancellation of its 2023-2024 season, because of insufficient financial resources.
- 19 September
  - The Orchestre Français des Jeunes announces the appointment of Kristiina Poska as its next music director, the first female conductor ever named to the post, effective in the summer of 2025.
  - At the Bösendorfer piano factory in Wiener Neustadt, a fire broke out late in the evening, continuing after midnight into the next day, with the loss of the piano factory building.
- 20 September
  - The Gyeonggi Philharmonic Orchestra announces the appointment of Sunwook Kim as its next music director, as of January 2024, with an initial contract through December 2025.
  - The Staatsoperette Dresden announces the appointment of Michael Ellis Ingram as its next chief conductor, effective with the 2024–2025 season.
  - The BBC announces the winners of its BBC Young Composer 2023 competition:
    - Lower Junior Category (age 12-14)
      - Atharv Gupta – Demain, Dès L'Aube
      - Avram Harris – Across the Void
    - Upper Junior Category (age 15-16)
      - Advaith Jagannath – Saturn Devouring his Son
      - Pascal Bachmann – Étude-Grotesque
    - Senior Category (age 17-18)
      - Jamie Smith – Into Oblivion
      - Reese Carly Manglicmot – Rumble
  - The Prague Symphony Orchestra announces the appointment of Tomáš Netopil as its next chief conductor, effective with the 2025–2026 season.
- 21 September – The Kitchener-Waterloo Symphony files for bankruptcy, days after announcing the cancellation of its 2023-2024 season.
- 22 September – NorrlandsOperan announces the appointment of Eduardo Strausser as its next principal conductor and music director, effective in the autumn of 2024, with an initial contract of three seasons.
- 26 September – Calgary Opera announces the appointment of Sue Elliott as its next general director and chief executive officer, effective 20 November 2023.
- 27 September – The Berlin State Opera and the Staatskapelle Berlin announce the appointment of Christian Thielemann as their next Generalmusikdirektor, effective 1 September 2024.
- 28 September – The Los Angeles Master Chorale announces the appointment of Scott Altman as its next president and chief executive officer, effective 2 January 2024.
- 29 September – The Boston Symphony Orchestra announces the appointment of Edward Gazouleas as the next director of the Tanglewood Music Center, effective 31 May 2024.
- 2 October – The Sapporo Symphony Orchestra announces the appointment of Elias Grandy as its next chief conductor, effective April 2025.
- 7 October – Vancouver Opera announces the appointment of Jacques Lacombe as its music director, with immediate effect.
- 10 October – The Orchestre national de Lille announces the appointment of Joshua Weilerstein as its next music director, effective September 2024.
- 12 October
  - The Bremer Philharmoniker announces the appointment of Guido Gärtner as its new Intendant (managing director), effective March 2024.
  - The Staatskapelle Weimar announces the appointment of Ivan Repušić as its next chief conductor, effective with the 2024–2025 season.
- 15 October – Martyn Brabbins resigns as music director of English National Opera with immediate effect, in protest at proposed music personnel reductions to the company's music staff.
- 16 October – The Helsingborg Symphony Orchestra announces the appointment of Maxime Pascal as its next chief conductor, effective August 2024.
- 22 October – The Emerson String Quartet gives its final concert in New York City at Alice Tully Hall, joined by its former cellist David Finckel.
- 25 October
  - The BBC announces the appointment of Bill Chandler as the next director of the BBC Symphony Orchestra and BBC Symphony Chorus, effective December 2023.
  - In parallel with his appointment to the BBC Symphony Orchestra and Chorus, Bill Chandler is to stand down as director of the BBC Concert Orchestra, as of December 2023.
  - The BBC announces the appointment of Adam Szabo as director of the BBC Philharmonic, effective February 2024.
  - Manchester Collective announces that Adam Szabo is to stand down as its artistic director and chief executive, effective January 2024.
- 27 October
  - The Dartington College of Arts announces that its planned 2024 summer school season is on hold, and the resignation of Sara Mohr-Pietsch and the summer school staff, with immediate effect.
  - Waltraud Meier gives her final career performance at the Staatsoper Unter den Linden, as Klytemnestra in the company's production of Elektra.
  - The Gstaad Menuhin Festival announces that Christoph Müller is to stand down as its artistic director in the autumn of 2025.
  - Spoleto Festival USA announces the appointment of Paul Wiancko as its new director of chamber music.
- 7 November
  - The Barbican Centre announces the appointment of Helen Wallace as its new head of music, effective February 2024.
  - Kings Place announces that Helen Wallace is to stand down as its artistic and executive director at the close of January 2024.
  - English National Ballet announces the appointment of Maria Seletskaja as its next music director, the first female conductor to be named to the post, effective with the 2024–2025 season.
- 15 November – Leipzig Opera announces the appointment of Ivan Repušić as its next Generalmusikdirektor, effective with the 2025–2026 season.
- 16 November – Oxford Brookes University announces the scheduled closure of its music department and the shuttering of its music programmes in 2026.
- 17 November – Syracuse Opera announces the cancellation of the remainder of its 2023-2024 season.
- 23 November – The BBC announces that David Pickard is to stand down as director of The Proms after the 2024 season.
- 30 November – The Orchestre National de Bretagne announces the appointment of Nicholas Ellis as its next music director, effective with the 2024–2025 season, with an initial contract of four seasons.
- 1 December – The Bolshoi Theatre announces the appointment of Valery Gergiev as its new artistic director, with immediate effect, with an initial contract of 5 years.
- 4 December
  - Glyndebourne Festival Opera announces the appointment of Adam Hickox as the new principal conductor of Glyndebourne Sinfonia, with immediate effect.
  - Trinity Church (Manhattan) announces the appointment of Melissa Attebury as its new director of music, the first woman to hold the post, effective with the 2024–2025 season.
- 5 December
  - English National Opera announces Greater Manchester as the site of its planned new headquarters.
  - The Grawemeyer Awards announce Aleksandra Vrebalov as the recipient of the 2024 Grawemeyer Award for Music Composition, for her composition Missa Supratext.
- 6 December
  - The Residentie Orchestra announces simultaneously that Anja Bihlmaier is to stand down as its chief conductor at the close of the 2024–2025 season, and the appointment of Jun Märkl as its next chief conductor, effective with the 2025–2026 season, with an initial contract of 4 years.
  - The National Youth Orchestra of Canada announces the appointment of Naomi Woo as its next music director, the first female conductor ever named to the post, for the 2024/2025 seasons.
- 7 December – Arcangelo announces the appointment of Sir Nicholas Kenyon as its next chair of trustees, effective March 2024.
- 8 December – The mayor of Nice and the Orchestre philharmonique de Nice announce the appointment of Lionel Bringuier as the orchestra's next principal conductor, effective with the 2023–2024 season, with an initial contract of two seasons.
- 11 December – Minnesota Opera announces the appointment of Christopher Franklin as its new principal conductor, with immediate effect, with an initial contract of 3 years.
- 12 December – The Charlotte Symphony Orchestra announces the appointment of Kwamé Ryan as its next music director, effective with the 2024–2025 season, with an initial contract of 4 years.
- 13 December
  - The Opéra de Lille announces the appointment of Barbara Eckle as its next general director, effective 1 July 2025.
  - The Cincinnati May Festival announces the appointment of Matthew Swanson as its next director of choruses, effective 1 June 2024.
- 14 December – Dutch National Ballet announces the appointment of Koen Kessels as its next music director, which includes the posts of artistic director and chief conductor of Het Balletorkest, effective 1 August 2024.
- 20 December
  - The Dresden Philharmonic announces the appointment of Sir Donald Runnicles as its next chief conductor, effective with the 2025–2026 season.
  - Buckingham Palace announces that Dame Sarah Connolly is to receive The King's Medal for Music.
- 22 December
  - The Theater Kiel announces the appointment of Gabriel Feltz as its next Generalmusikdirektor, as of the 2024–2025 season.
  - The Gothenburg Symphony Orchestra announces that Santtu-Matias Rouvali is to stand down as its chief conductor at the close of the 2024–2025 season.
- 28 December – Ardyth Brott, Deantha Rae Edmunds, and Gary Kulesha are appointed Members of the Order of Canada.
- 29 December – The New Year Honours 2024
  - Judith Weir is made a Dame Commander of the Order of the British Empire (DBE).
  - Laurence Cummings, Michael Eakin, and Carolyn Sampson are each made an Officer of the Order of the British Empire (OBE).
  - Margaret Fingerhut and Anna Lapwood are each made a Member of the Order of the British Empire (MBE).
- 30 December – The Government of Austria announces a financial assistance package of 800K € for the Vienna Boys' Choir.

== New works ==
The following composers' works were composed, premiered, or published this year, as noted in the citation.

=== A ===
- John Luther Adams
  - Vespers of the Blessed Earth
  - Prophecies of Stone
- Samuel Adams – No Such Spring (piano concerto)
- George Alexander Albrecht – Cello Concerto
- Julian Anderson – ECHOES
- Mark Andre – Echographien 4
- Kristina Arakelyan – Whin Lands (texts by Katrina Porteous)
- Newton Armstrong – The Book of the Sediments'
- Clarice Assad – Ode to Carmen Miranda
- Matthew Aucoin – Heath (King Lear Sketches)

=== B ===
- Joanna Bailie – 1979'
- Gerald Barry – Kafka's Earplugs
- Thomas Bangalter – Mythologies
- Olivia Belli – Limina Luminis
- Laura Bowler – Advert
- Lee Bradshaw – Resolve (for string quartet)
- Anthony Braxton – Thunder Music
- Kerensa Briggs
  - Ode to a Savior
  - A blue and tender flower
- Linda Buckley – Mallacht
- Arturas Bumšteinas – Stand-by for Minna

=== C ===
- Griiffin Candey – What I Didn't Know Before (text by Ada Limón)
- Anne Cawrse – Dare to Declare (marimba concerto)
- Ryan Chase – Piano Quintet
- Ke-Chia Chen – Ebbs and Flows
- Anna Clyne – Weathered (clarinet concerto)
- Douglas J. Cuomo – Proverb
- Jonathan Cziner – Nifrach

=== D ===
- Richard Danielpour - Tryptich (Symphony in Three Movements)
- Steven Daverson – La Nitroglycérine des Lumières
- Taylor Scott Davis
  - Musica Dei
  - To Sing of Love
- Angharad Davies – Empty Spaces
- Brett Dean – In spe contra spem
- Justin Dello Joio – Oceans Apart (Concerto for Piano and Orchestra)
- Bernd Richard Deutsch – Con moto

=== E ===
- Brian Elias – I saw a peacock
- Rufus Isabel Elliot – the stones in the river by our camp in the forest / the space on the ground where we lay
- Amir ElSaffar – Dhikra
- Randall Eng – Miracles (text by Walt Whitman)
- Peter Eötvös – LIGETIDYLL
- Peter Evans – Animations

=== F ===
- Mary Finsterer
  - MYSTERIUM I
  - Stabat Mater ad Honorem Beatæ Mariæ Virginis
- Alissa Firsova – A Spell for Creation
- Bohdana Frolyak – Let There Be Light

=== G ===
- Álvaro Gallegos – Oración a Maria Goretti
- Jannik Giger – Troisième œil'
- Maria Grenfell – Bitter Tears (for piano trio)

=== H ===
- Adolphus Hailstork – Symphony No. 5
- Sadie Harrison – The River Dreams of Winter (first public performance)
- Ted Hearne – Farming
- Anders Hillborg – Piano Concerto No. 2 ('The MAX Concerto')
- Alex Ho (music) and Elayce Ismail (text) – The Glass Eye
- David Horne – Different Ghosts (Clarinet Quintet)
- Toshio Hosokawa – Invisible Angels
- Jack Hughes – Three Ways of Getting There
- Oswald Huỳnh – Then, as if breathing, the sea swelled beneath us

=== J ===
- Betsy Jolas – Ces belles années

=== K ===
- Elena Kats-Chernin – Violin Concerto
- Hannah Kendall – O flower of fire
- Guillermo Klein – The Kingdom
- Noriko Koide – Güiro Güiro
- Anna Korsun – Terricone

=== L ===
- Catherine Lamb – Portions Transparent/Opaque
- David Lang – poor hymnal
- Thomas Larcher – String Quartet No. 5 ("Out of the Bluest Blue")
- Ingrid Laubrock – Thinking Holes
- James Lee III
  - Visions of Cahokia
  - Breaths of Universal Longings
- Georges Lentz - “... to beam in distant heavens...” - Violin Concerto
- Alexander Levine – Vigil for Peace
- George E. Lewis – Weathering
- Sarah Lianne Lewis – The Sky Didn't Fall
- José Lezcano – Concierto Hispanoamericano
- Lei Liang – Silk and Bamboo Concerto
- Magnus Lindberg – Quintet for Piano and Winds
- Ryan Lindveit – Small Things
- Giulia Lorusso – Grain / Stream
- May Lyon – Forces of Nature

=== M ===
- Sir James MacMillan – Timotheus, Bacchus and Cecilia
- Philipp Maintz – liebeslieder. fünf lieder auf gedichte von elisabeth plessen
- Philippe Manoury – Rémanences-Palimpsest
- Jessie Marino – Murder Ballads: Volume II - The Positive Reinforcement Campaign
- Christian Mason (music) and Paul Griffiths (text) – The Singing Tree
- Grace-Evangeline Mason
  - A Memory of the Ocean,
  - ABLAZE THE MOON
- David Matthews – String Quartet No. 17
- Scott McLaughlin – The Dirac Sea: Folds in continuous fields
- Bart Michiels – De Profundis
- Cassandra Miller
  - I cannot love without trembling (viola concerto)
  - The City, Full of People
  - Swim
- David Moliner
  - Estructura IV 'Dämonische Iris'
  - Solo V
- Jessie Montgomery – Transfigure to Grace
- Reinaldo Moya – Rise (for cello and orchestra)

=== N ===
- Angélica Negrón – Arquitecta
- Lisa Neher – A Sonnet at the Edge of the Reef (text by Craig Santos Perez)
- Olga Neuwirth – Black Dwarf
- Edward Newton-Rex – I Stand in the Library
- Ailís Ní Ríain – The Land Grows Weary of its Own
- Akira Nishimura – Triple Concerto (“Dream of Butterfly”)
- Jesper Nordin – Convergence (violin concerto)

=== O ===
- Kris Oelbrandt – Psalm 125
- Elizabeth Ogonek – Moondog
- Shawn Okpebholo – Songs in Flight (texts selected by Tsitsi Ella Jaji)

=== P ===
- Younghi Pagh-Paan – Frau, warum weinst du? Wen suchst du?
- Roxanna Panufnik (music) and Jessica Duchen (texts) – Gallery of Memories
- Joseph Phibbs – Flame and Shadow
- Paul Pinto – The Approach
- Victoria Vita Polevá – The Bell (Symphony No. 4 for Cello and Orchestra)
- Kevin Puts – Concerto for Orchestra

=== R ===
- Éliane Radigue and Carol Robinson – Occam Océan Cinquanta
- Steve Reich – Jacob's Ladder
- Jüri Reinvere – On the Ship of Fools
- Alexey Retinsky – La Commedia für Orchester
- Damien Ricketson – Hectic Tulips
- Colin Riley – Hearing Places
- Matana Roberts – Elegy for Tyre: "Welcome to the World through my eyes..."

=== S ===
- Esa-Pekka Salonen – Sinfonia concertante for organ and orchestra
- Andrea Lorenzo Scartazzini –- Orkus
- Andrew Schultz – Graceful to Galloping (bassoon concerto)
- Jay Schwartz – Theta
- Bakudi Scream – In My Heart, And Still
- Charlotte Seither
  - glashaus
  - Spurenelemente for Inside Piano
- Elnaz Seyedi (music) and Anja Kampmann (text) – Dunst - als käme alles zurück
- Sean Shepherd – An Einem Klaren Tag – On a Clear Day (texts by Ulla Hahn)
- Carlos Simon
  - Four Black American Dances
  - Songs of Separation (text by Coleman Barks)
- Derrick Skye – Nova Plexus
- Angela Elizabeth Slater – Where skies aflame
- Gabriella Smith – Lost Coast (cello concerto version)
- Tyshawn Sorey – For Ross Gay
- Miroslav Srnka – Superorganisms
- Christopher Stark – Other Pines
- Lisa Streich – ISHJÄRTA

=== T ===
- Craig Taborn – Busy Griefs and Endangered Charms
- Steven Kazuo Takasugi – Concerto for Piano, Orchestra and Electronics
- Tan Dun – Requiem for Nature
- Outi Tarkiainen – Milky Ways (English horn concerto)
- Joseph Tawadros – Three Stages of Hindsight (oud concerto)'
- Josh Taylor – Nocturne
- Iris ter Schiphorst (music) and Felicitas Hoppe (text) – Was wird hier eigentlich gespielt? Doppelbiographie des 21sten Jahrhunderts
- Anna S. Þorvaldsdóttir
  - Rituals (for string quartet)
  - Ubique
- Louisa Trewartha – Weave Magic Secrets

=== U ===
- Motoki Ueda
  - Dreams of Vague Memories
  - Reliving the Imagination

=== V ===
- Rick van Veldhuizen – Magyar újrakeverés
- Francesca Verunelli – Tune and Retune II

=== W ===
- Jennifer Walshe and Matthew Shlomowitz – Minor Characters
- Lotta Wennäkoski – Prosoidia (violin concerto)
- Trevor Weston – American Lamentations
- Jörg Widmann – Friedenskantate
- Ryan Wigglesworth – Quatre Vignettes de Jules Renard (version for voice and orchestra)
- James B. Wilson – Eden
- Julia Wolfe
  - Pretty
  - unEarth

=== Y ===
- Nina C. Young
  - Out of whose womb came the ice (text by Young and David Tinervia)
  - Traces (violin concerto)
- Joji Yuasa – Locus of the Orchestra

=== Z ===
- Aaron Zigman (music), Mark Campbell and Brock Walsh (text) – Émigré

== New operas ==
- Sarah Angliss and Ross Sutherland – Giant
- Gelsey Bell – mɔɹnɪŋ [morning//mourning]
- Sir George Benjamin and Martin Crimp – Picture a Day Like This
- Justine F. Chen and David Simpatico – The Life and Death(s) of Alan Turing
- Raquel García-Tomás and Irène Gayraud - Alexina B.
- Jake Heggie and Gene Scheer – Intelligence
- Stefan Heucke and Ralph Köhnen – Aida – der fünfte Akt
- Jan Kučera and David Radok – Don Buoso
- David Lang – note to a friend (adapted from texts by Ryunosuke Akutagawa)
- Will Liverman, DJ King Rico, and Rajendra Ramoon Maharaj – The Factotum
- Dylan Mattingly and Thomas Bartscherer – Stranger Love
- Conor Mitchell – Abomination: A DUP Opera
- Emma O'Halloran and Mark O'Halloran:
  - Trade
  - Mary Motorhead
- Tobias Picker and Aryeh Lev Stollman – Lili Elbe
- Christopher Sainsbury and Jane Harrison – The Visitors
- Salvatore Sciarrino – Venere e Adone
- Sheila Silver and Stephen Kitsakos – A Thousand Splendid Suns
- Kate Soper
  - The Romance of the Rose
  - The Hunt
- Yevhen Stankovych – The Terrible Revenge
- Joby Talbot and Gene Scheer – The Diving Bell and the Butterfly
- Jeanine Tesori and George Brant – Grounded
- Manfred Trojahn – Septembersonate'
- Philip Venables and Ted Huffman – The Faggots and Their Friends Between Revolutions
- Vito Žuraj and Händl Klaus – Blühen

== New albums ==
- Thomas Adès – Dante (first recording)
- Louis Wayne Ballard – Devil's Promenade, Scenes From Indian Life (selections), The Four Moons (selections), Fantasy Aborigine No. 3 ("Kokopelli") (first recordings)
- Kerensa Briggs – Requiem (first recordings)
- Christopher Cerrone – In a Grove
- John Corigliano and Mark Adamo – The Lord of Cries (first recording)
- Laurence Crane, Cassandra Miller, Linda Catlin Smith –Folk's Music
- Julius Eastman, Vol. 3 – If You’re So Smart, Why Aren’t You Rich?
- Jürg Frey – String Quartet No. 4 (Quatuor Bozzini)
- Wilhelm Grosz, Mátyás Seiber, Walter Goehr – Achtung, Aufnahme! (Ebony Band, their final album with Werner Herbers)
- James P. Johnson – De Organizer / The Dreamy Kid
- Helvi Leiviska – "Orchestral Works, Volume 1"
- Wynton Marsalis – Symphony No. 4 ('The Jungle')
- Missy Mazzoli – Dark With Excessive Bright
- Paola Prestini and Mark Campbell – Edward Tulane (first recording)
- Puccini – Turandot (first studio recording with the full completion by Franco Alfano)
- Kaija Saariaho – 'Reconnaissance
- Schoenberg, Hindemith, Berg, Chausson – Infinite Voyage (Emerson String Quartet and Barbara Hannigan; final commercial recording of the Emerson String Quartet)
- Dame Ethel Smyth – Der Wald (first recording)
- Henry Threadgill – The Other One
- Anna S. Þorvaldsdóttir – Archora / Aion
- Eric Wubbels – If and Only If
- Iannis Xenakis, Vivian Fung, Roger Reynolds, Sarah Hennies – Weather Systems II: Soundlines
- Jessye Norman: The Unreleased Masters (first commercial issue of previously unissued recordings by Jessye Norman of music by Berlioz, Britten, Franz Joseph Haydn, Richard Strauss, Wagner)
- Compositrices: New Light on French Romantic Women Composers – recordings of music by Mel Bonis, Lili Boulanger, Nadia Boulanger, Marthe Bracquemond, Cécile Chaminade, Hedwige Chrétien, Marie Damaschino, Jeanne Danglas, Clémence de Grandval, Hélène de Montgeroult, Louise Farrenc, Augusta Holmès, Marie Jaëll, Madeleine Jaeger, Marthe Grumbach, Madeleine Lemariey, Virginie Morel-du Verger, Henriette Renié, Charlotte Sohy, Rita Strohl, Pauline Viardot

== Deaths ==
- 2 January
  - Andrew Downes, British composer and pedagogue, 72
  - Kurt Horres, German stage director and opera house administrator, 90
- 8 January – Siegfried Kurz, German conductor, 92
- 9 January
  - Yoriaki Matsudaira, Japanese composer, 91
  - Charles ('Chas') Wetherbee, American violinist and pedagogue, 56
  - Magnar Mangersnes, Norwegian choral conductor and organist, 84
- 10 January
  - José Evangelista, Spanish composer and pedagogue resident in Canada, 79
  - Heinz Hanke, Austrian orchestral violinist, 81
- 12 January – Charles Treger, American violinist and pedagogue, 87
- 17 January – Manana Doijashvili, Georgian pianist and pedagogue, 75
- 18 January
  - Clytus Gottwald, German choral conductor, composer, musicologist, and theologian, 97
  - Victor Rasgado, Mexican composer and pianist, 63
- 20 January – Michaela Paetsch, American violinist, 61
- 21 January – Eckhard Seifert, Austrian orchestral violinist, 70
- 22 January
  - Zhanna Pliyeva, Russian pianist and composer, 73
  - Easley Blackwood Jr., American composer, 89
- 26 January – Angelina Ruzzafante, Dutch soprano, 57
- 28 January – Evgeny Mogilevsky, Russian pianist, 77
- 29 January
  - Jean-Loup Boisseau, French organ builder, 82
  - Gabriel Tacchino, French pianist, 88
- 4 February – Jürgen Flimm, German opera director and administrator, 81
- 8 February – Hilary Tann, Wales-born composer resident in the USA, 75
- 9 February – Lewis Spratlan, American composer, 82
- 14 February – Friedrich Cerha, Austrian composer, 96
- 19 February – Christopher Nupen, British music documentary filmmaker, 88
- 2 March – Nicholas Snowman, British arts administrator and co-founder of the London Sinfonietta, 78
- 5 March – Kenneth Montgomery, British conductor, 79
- 8 March – Sonia Jelinkova, German-born Czech-Canadian violinist and pedagogue, 99
- 19 March – Marc Aubort, Switzerland-born American recording engineer and producer, 93
- 21 March – Virginia Zeani, Romanian soprano and pedagogue resident in the United States, 97
- 27 March – James Bowman, British countertenor, 81
- 3 April – Royce Salzman, American choral conductor, pedagogue, and co-founder of the Oregon Bach Festival, 94
- 5 April – Kostiantyn Starovytskyi, Ukrainian conductor, 40 (combat casualty of the 2022 Russian invasion of Ukraine)
- 11 April – Rudolf Weinsheimer, German orchestral cellist, 91
- 17 April – Nikita Storojev, Russian-American bass and pedagogue, 72
- 20 April – David Ellis, British composer and music administrator, 90
- 25 April – Manfred Weiss, German composer, 88
- 27 April – Ronald Hoogeveen, Dutch orchestral violinist, 74
- 30 April – Thomas Stacy, American orchestral English horn player, 84
- 6 May – Menahem Pressler, German-born pianist and founding member of the Beaux Arts Trio, 99
- 7 May
  - Grace Bumbry, American mezzo-soprano, 86
  - Sona Cervena, Czech mezzo-soprano, 97
- 14 May – Ingrid Haebler, Austrian pianist, 93
- 18 May
  - Wolf-Dieter Hauschild, German conductor, 85
  - Roland C. Jordan Jr., American composer and pedagogue, 84
- 20 May – Paul Desenne, Venezuelan composer, 63
- 2 June – Kaija Saariaho, Finnish composer, 70
- 5 June – Werner Herbers, Dutch oboist and founder of the Ebony Band, 82
- 10 June – Gerhardt Zimmermann, American conductor, 77
- 16 June – Peter Dickinson, British composer, musicologist, author, and pianist, 86
- 19 June – Gabriele Schnaut, German soprano and mezzo-soprano, 72
- 27 June – Robert Sherman, American radio broadcaster, author, music critic, and educator, 90
- 28 June – Kenneth Riegel, American tenor, 85
- 5 July – Anthony Gilbert, 88, British composer and academic.
- 6 July
  - Graham Clark, British tenor, 81
  - Lee Sang-eun, South Korean soprano, 46
- 11 July – Yuzo Toyama, Japanese composer and conductor, 91
- 12 July – André Watts, American pianist, 77
- 15 July – Danica Mastilović, Serbian soprano, 89
- 29 July – Nancy Van de Vate, American composer, 92
- 11 August – Florence Malgoire, French violinist, conductor, and pedagogue, 63
- 12 August – Berit Lindholm, Swedish soprano, 88
- 15 August – Arnold Östman, Swedish conductor and harpsichordist, 83
- 16 August – Renata Scotto, Italian soprano, 89
- 19 August – Gloria Coates, American composer, 89
- 26 August – Gordon Peters, American orchestral percussionist, 92
- 1 September
  - Kunio Tsuchiya, Japanese orchestral violist and the first Japanese member of the Berlin Philharmonic Orchestra, 89 (death announced on this date)
  - Milka Stojanovic, Serbian soprano, 86
- 3 September – Walter Arlen, Austria-born music critic, academic and composer resident in the USA, 103
- 5 September – Anatol Ugorski, Russia-born pianist resident in Germany, 80
- 6 September – Abraham Kaplan, Israeli choral conductor, 92
- 7 September – Akira Nishimura, Japanese composer, 69
- 19 September – Stephen Gould, American tenor, 61
- 22 September – Joseph Guastafeste, American orchestral double bassist, 76
- 23 September – Alejandro Meerapfel, Argentine baritone, 54
- 24 September – Felix Ayo, Spanish violinist and founder of I Musici, 90
- 25 September – Anneke Uittenbosch, Dutch harpsichordist, 93
- 30 September – Russell Sherman, American pianist, 93
- 1 October – Patricia Janečková, German-born Slovak soprano, 25
- 2 October
  - Herbert Handt, American tenor, conductor and musicologist, 97
  - James Jorden, American opera blogger and founder of 'Parterre Box' opera zine/blog, 69 (found dead on this date)
- 3 October – Jacqueline Dark, Australian mezzo-soprano and cabaret singer, 55
- 4 October – Rafail Kasimov, Polish-born Russian composer, pianist and pedagogue, 76
- 6 October
  - Maurice Bourgue, French oboist, 83
  - Heinz Ortleb, German orchestral violinist, 91
- 10 October – Thomas Wikman, American conductor, 81
- 25 October
  - Zdeněk Mácal, Czech conductor, 87
  - Karen Dirks, American orchestral violist, 76
- 1 November – Vladimir Urbanovich, Russian composer and pedagogue, 85
- 2 November
  - Yuri Temirkanov, Russian conductor, 84
  - Evgeny Shiryaev, Russian composer, 80
  - Morris Jacob, American orchestral violist, 70
- 5 November
  - Ryland Davies, British tenor, 80
  - Harald Heckmann, German musicologist, 98
- 7 November – Haris Xanthoudakis, Greek composer, 73
- 8 November – Keel Watson, British bass-baritone, 69
- 10 November – Mobil Babayev, Azerbaijani composer, 77
- 14 November – Franz Xaver Ohnesorg, German arts administrator, 75
- 18 November – David Del Tredici, American composer, 86
- 19 November – Catherine Christer Hennix, Swedish composer, 75
- 29 November – Mildred Miller Posvar, American mezzo-soprano and founder of Pittsburgh Opera Theater, 98
- 4 December – Marlena Kleinman Malas, American mezzo-soprano and pedagogue, 87
- 7 December – Zita Carno, American pianist, 88
- 12 December – Richard Gaddes, British opera administrator active in the United States, 81
- 13 December – Richard Adams, American orchestral violinist, 94
- 24 December
  - Alice Parker, American composer, 98
  - Ron Nelson, American composer, 94
- 29 December
  - Hermann Baumann, German horn player, 89
  - Karl-Heinz Duse-Utesch, German orchestral trombonist, 93
- 30 December
  - Philippe Arrii-Blachette, French violinist and conductor, 87
  - Marcel Saint-Cyr, Canadian cellist, viola da gamba player, pedagogue, and founding member of the Orford String Quartet, 85

== Major awards ==
- 2023 Pulitzer Prize in Music – Rhiannon Giddens and Michael Abels – Omar

=== Grammy Awards ===
- Best Chamber Music/Small Ensemble Performance: Caroline Shaw – Evergreen; Attacca Quartet (Nonesuch)
- Best Choral Performance: Michael Gilbertson and Edie Hill – Born; The Crossing, Donald Nally, conductor (Navona Records)
- Best Classical Compendium: Kitt Wakeley – An Adoption Story
- Best Classical Instrumental Solo: Letters for the Future (works by Jennifer Higdon and Kevin Puts); Time for Three, The Philadelphia Orchestra, and Xian Zhang (Deutsche Grammophon)
- Best Contemporary Classical Composition: Kevin Puts – Contact; Time for Three, The Philadelphia Orchestra, and Xian Zhang (Deutsche Grammophon)
- Best Classical Solo Vocal Album: Voice of Nature: The Anthropocene; Renée Fleming and Yannick Nézet-Séguin (Decca Classics)
- Best Opera Recording: Terence Blanchard and Kasi Lemmons – Fire Shut Up In My Bones; Angel Blue, Will Liverman, Latonia Moore, Walter Russell III; The Metropolitan Opera Orchestra, The Metropolitan Opera Chorus; Yannick Nézet-Séguin, conductor (David Frost, producer)
- Best Engineered Album, Classical: Mason Bates: Philharmonia Fantastique – The Making of the Orchestra; Chicago Symphony Orchestra; Edwin Outwater, conductor; Shawn Murphy, Charlie Post and Gary Rydstrom, engineers; Michael Romanowski, mastering engineer (Sony)
- Best Orchestral Performance: Works by Florence Price, Valerie Coleman and Jessie Montgomery; New York Youth Symphony, Michelle Cann, piano, Michael Repper, conductor (Avie)
- Producer of the Year, Classical: Judith Sherman

=== Victoires de la musique classique 2023 ===
- Soliste instrumental: Bertrand Chamayou
- Artiste lyrique: Marina Viotti
- Révélation, soliste instrumental: Aurélien Pascal
- Révélation, artiste lyrique: Alexandra Marcellier
- Révélation, chef d’orchestre: Victor Jacob, Lucie Leguay
- Composer: Fabien Waksman – L’Île du temps (concerto for accordion & orchestra; from Warner Classics album J’ai deux amours)
- Recording: Johann Sebastian Bach – Matthäus-Passion (Pygmalion. Raphaël Pichon)

=== 2023 Gramophone Classical Music Awards ===
- Choral: John Cage – Choral works; Latvian Radio Choir / Sigvards Kļava (Ondine)
- Concerto: Elgar – ‘Viola Concerto’ / Bloch - Suite For Viola and Orchestra; Timothy Ridout, BBC Symphony Orchestra, Martyn Brabbins (harmonia mundi)
- Chamber: Wolfgang Amadeus Mozart – String Quintets No 3 (K. 515) and No 4 (K. 516); Ébène Quartet with Antoine Tamestit (Erato)
- Concept Album: '‘Battle Cry: She Speaks'’; Helen Charlston and Toby Carr (Delphian)
- Contemporary: Lotta Wennäkoski – Sigla / Flounce / Sedecim; Sivan Magen, Finnish Radio Symphony Orchestra, Nicholas Collon (Ondine)
- Early Music: Ludwig Daser – Polyphonic Masses; Huelgas Ensemble, Paul Van Nevel (Deutsche Harmonia Mundi)
- Instrumental: Bartók, Eötvös, Ligeti, Veress: Music for Solo Violin and Viola; Nurit Stark (BIS)
- Opera: Michael Tippett – The Midsummer Marriage; Robert Murray, Rachel Nicholls, Ashley Riches, Jennifer France, Toby Spence, Claire Barnett-Jones, Susan Bickley, Joshua Bloom; English National Opera Chorus; London Philharmonic Orchestra and Choir, Edward Gardner (LPO)
- Orchestral: Carl Nielsen – Symphonies Nos 4 ('The Inextinguishable') and 5; Danish National Symphony Orchestra, Fabio Luisi (Deutsche Grammophon)
- Piano: Karol Szymanowski – Piano Works; Krystian Zimerman (Deutsche Grammophon)
- Song: Gabriel Fauré – Complete Songs; Cyrille Dubois and Tristan Raës (Aparté)
- Spatial Audio: Richard Wagner – Die Walküre, James King, Hans Hotter, Christa Ludwig, Régine Crespin, Gottlob Frick et al., Vienna Philharmonic Orchestra; Sir Georg Solti (Decca)
- Voice and Ensemble: Rivales; Véronique Gens, Sandrine Piau, Le Concert de la Loge, Julien Chauvin (Alpha)
- Recording of the Year: Carl Nielsen – Symphonies Nos 4 ('The Inextinguishable') and 5; Danish National Symphony Orchestra, Fabio Luisi (Deutsche Grammophon)
- Lifetime Achievement: Dame Felicity Lott
- Label of the Year: BIS Records
- Young Artist of the Year: Stella Chen – ‘Stella x Schubert’ (Schubert: Fantasie, D.934; Rondo brillant, D. 895; 'Sei mir gegrüsst', D. 741; 'Ständchen', D. 920); Stella Chen and Henry Kramer (Platoon)
- Artist of the Year: Véronique Gens
- Orchestra of the Year: Deutsche Kammerphilharmonie Bremen

=== 2023 Ivors Classical Awards ===
- Best Chamber Ensemble Composition: Thomas Adès – Növények
- Best Choral Composition: Ben Nobuto – Sol
- Best Community and Composition Competition: Dobrinka Tabakova – Swarm Fanfares
- Best Large Ensemble Competition: Hannah Kendall – shouting forever into the receiver
- Best Orchestral Composition: Brett Dean – Cello Concerto
- Best Small Chamber Composition: Josephine Stephenson – Comme l’espoir/you might all disappear
- Best Sound Art: Olivia Loulel – LOL
- Best Stage Work: Brian Irvine – Least Like the Other: Searching for Rosemary Kennedy
- Academy Fellowship: John Rutter
- Outstanding Works Collection: Tansy Davies
- Innovation Award: Matthew Herbert
