= Powder Her Face =

1995 chamber opera in two acts by Thomas Adès

- Chamber opera by Thomas Adès
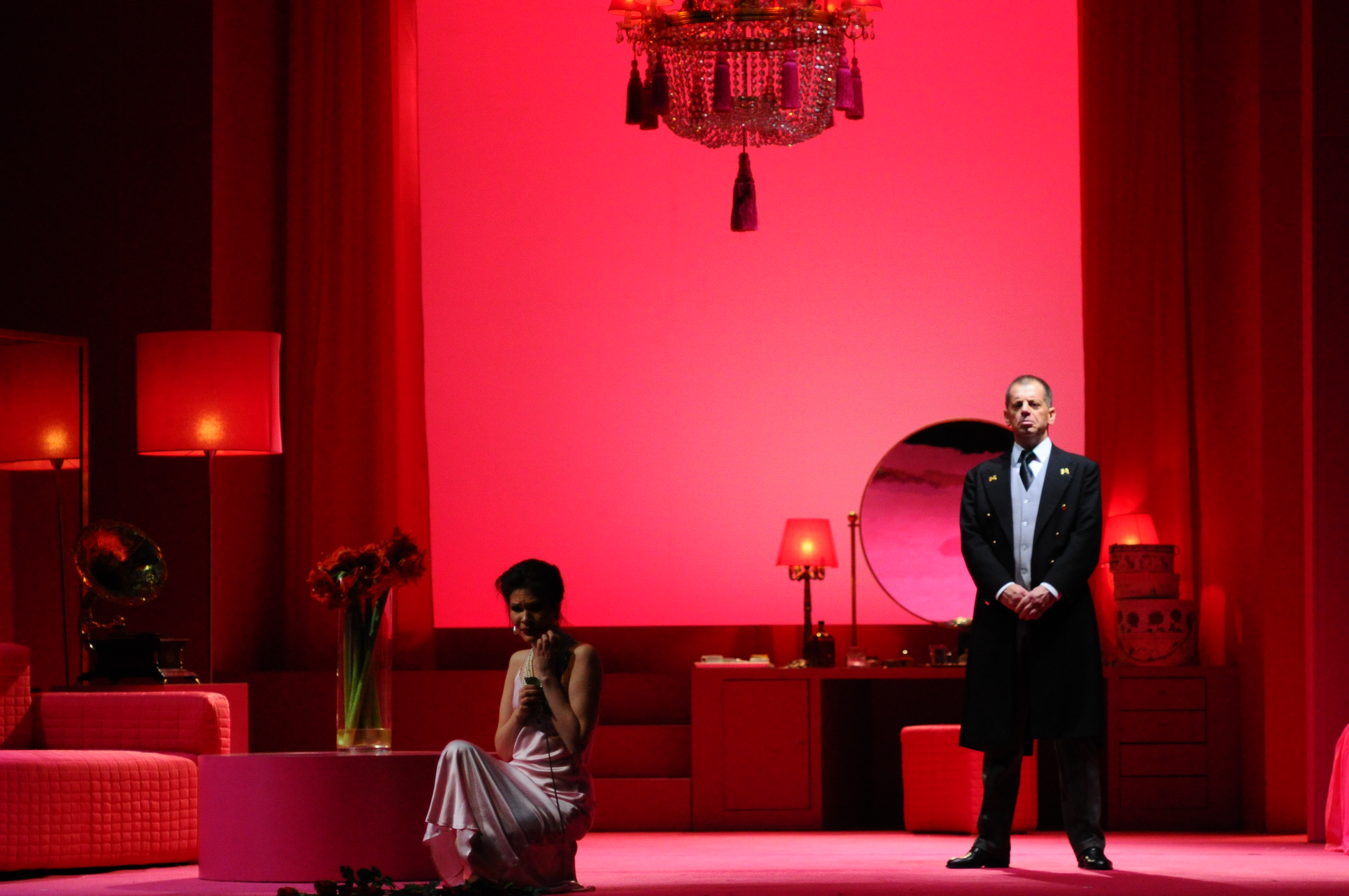
- Scene in a production by Pier Luigi Pizzi at the Teatro Comunale Bologna, 2010
- Librettist: Philip Hensher
- Based on: life of Margaret Campbell, Duchess of Argyll
- Premiere: 1 July 1995; Cheltenham Music Festival

Powder Her Face, Op. 14 (1995), is a chamber opera in two acts by the British composer Thomas Adès, with an English libretto by Philip Hensher. The opera is 100 minutes long. It was commissioned by the Almeida Opera, a part of London's Almeida Theatre, for performances at the Cheltenham Music Festival.

The subject of the opera is the "Dirty Duchess", Margaret Campbell, Duchess of Argyll, whose sexual exploits were the stuff of scandal and gossip in Britain in 1963 during her divorce proceedings. The opera is explicit in its language and detail.

It was first performed on 1 July 1995 in Cheltenham, with Jill Gomez in the leading role. Reviews were generally good, but the opera became notorious for its musical depiction of fellatio: British radio station Classic FM considered it unsuitable for transmission.

== Style ==
The music of the sexually themed opera combines influences ranging from Alban Berg, Igor Stravinsky, and Benjamin Britten to Kurt Weill and the tangos of Ástor Piazzolla. Describing the overall impact of the libretto and the theatricality of the entire production, Alex Ross notes:

Hensher seized the opportunity to create the first onstage blow job in opera history, but he also twisted the story into something more generalised and expressionistic: Margaret becomes a half-comic, half-tragic figure, a nitwit outlaw. There were clear parallels with Alban Berg’s epic of degradation, Lulu [...] The libretto reads like a nasty farce, but it takes on emotional breadth when the music is added. With a few incredibly seductive stretches of thirties-era popular melody, Adès shows the giddy world that the Duchess lost, and when her bright harmony lurches down to a terrifying B-flat minor he exposes the male cruelty that quickened her fall. Adès's harmonic tricks have a powerful theatrical impact: there’s a repeated sense of a beautiful mirage shattering into cold, alienated fragments.

== Performance history ==
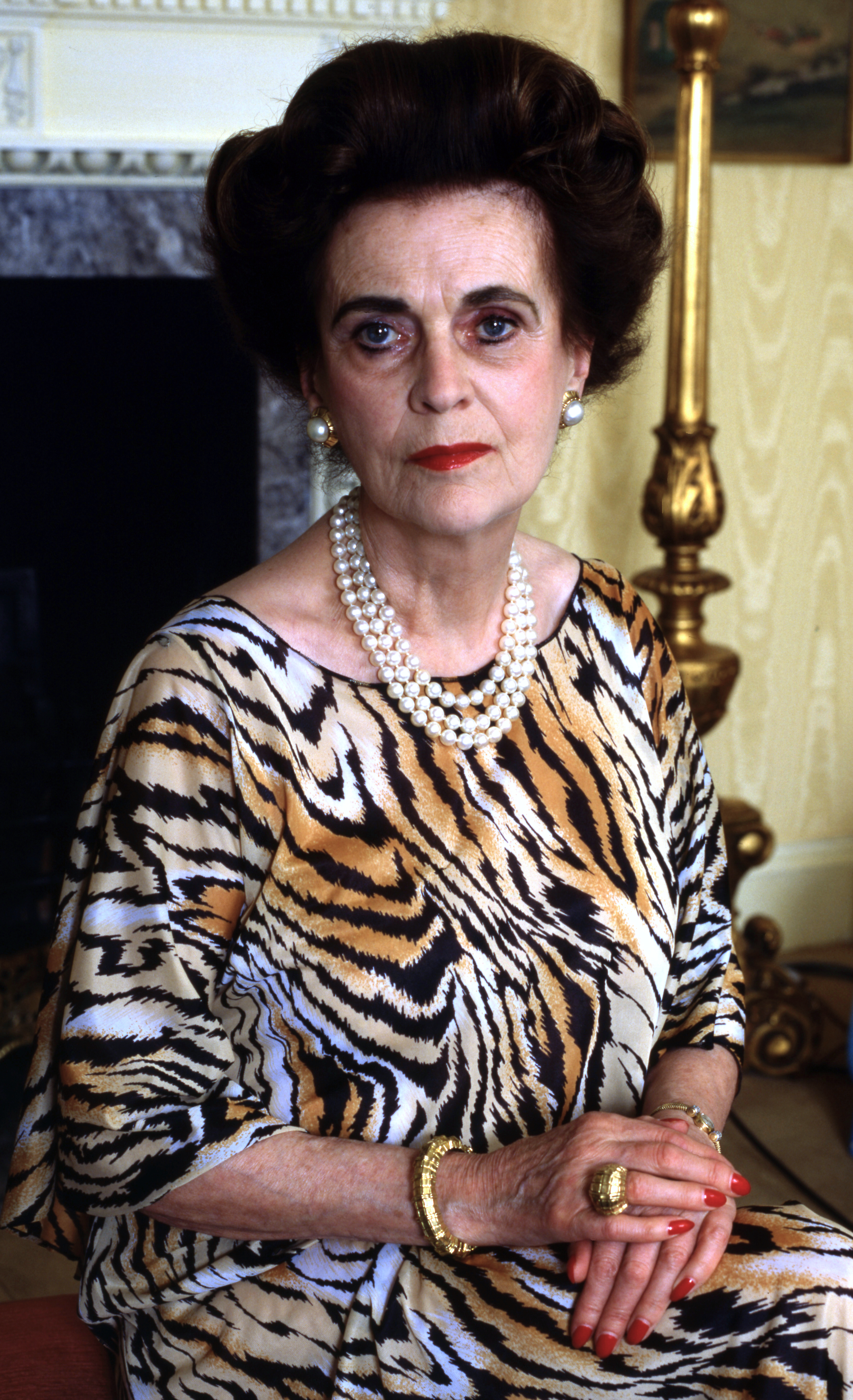
The real-life Duchess of Argyll

After the premiere, there were five London performances at the Almeida Theatre.

On 8 June 2006, there was a concert performance at the Barbican Centre, London, with the London Symphony Orchestra, conducted by the composer.

From 11 to 22 June 2008, it was performed at the Linbury Studio Theatre in the Royal Opera House, London, with the Southbank Sinfonia conducted by Timothy Redmond, and Joan Rodgers as the Duchess.

The U.S. staged premiere was at the Aspen Music Festival on 25 July 1997, conducted by the composer, with Máire O'Brien as the Duchess, Heather Buck, and Allen Schrott, directed by Edward Berkeley. The same cast subsequently performed at the Brooklyn Academy of Music (BAM) on 10 December 1998 with the Brooklyn Philharmonic conducted by Robert Spano. Boston first heard the opera, as produced by Opera Boston, on 6 June 2003. The Boston Modern Opera Project was conducted by Gil Rose with Janna Baty as the Duchess; Buck and Schrott reassumed their roles.

Opera Vista staged the Houston premiere at the Hobby Center for the Performing Arts in November 2011 with Cassandra Black as the Duchess, Kyle Albertson, Kelly Waguespack, and Benjamin Robinson, staged by Houston Grand Opera's Sandra Bernhard and under the baton of Viswa Subbaraman.

The New York City Opera performed the opera in February 2013 at the BAM in a production by Jay Scheib and starring the soprano Allison Cook as the Duchess of Argyll. The Opera Company of Philadelphia performed the opera in June 2013, with Patricia Schuman in the lead role.

The German premiere took place at the Hebbel-Theater on 17 April 2001 as part of a coproduction led by the Berlin Chamber Opera, together with the Music Theatre Group Amsterdam. The orchestra was the Athelas Sinfonietta Copenhagen under the musical direction of Brynmor Jones with Sally Silver, Eileen Hulse, Richard Edgar-Wilson, and Martin Nelson. The Danish premiere took place later that year (2001) at Den Anden Opera with the same cast and orchestra also conducted by Brynmor Jones. The Switzerland premiere took place on May 30, 2021 at Equilibre, Fribourg, with additional performances at Stadttheater Schaffhausen; Théâtre de l'Athénée, Paris, France; and Teatro comunale, Bolzano, Italy, in a production by Nouvel Opéra Fribourg directed by Julien Chavaz with Sophie Marilley, Timur Bekbosunov, Alison Scherzer and Graeme Danby.

On January 20, 2024 the Nederlandse Reisopera presented the Dutch premiere at the Wilminktheater en MuziekcentrumEnschede with Laura Bohn as the Duchess, John Savournin, Alison Scherzer, and Daniel Arnoldos, with stage direction by Paul Carr and musical direction by Otto Tausk.

== Roles and premiere cast ==
| Role | Voice type | 1 July 1995 (Conductor: Brad Cohen) |
|---|---|---|
| Duchess | dramatic soprano | Jill Gomez |
| Hotel Manager, also Duke, Laundryman, Other guest | bass | Roger Bryson |
| Electrician, also Lounge Lizard, Waiter, Priest, Rubbernecker, Delivery Boy | tenor | Niall Morris |
| Maid, also Confidante, Waitress, Mistress, Rubbernecker, Society Journalist | high soprano | Valdine Anderson |

== Synopsis ==
=== Act 1 ===
- Scene 1 – 1990 (The hotel). An electrician and a maid are discovered by the Duchess in her suite, ridiculing her. The scene closes with the entrance of a male figure.
- Scene 2 – 1934 (A country House). The Duchess's confidante and a lounge lizard discuss her recent divorce. The Duke makes an impressive entrance.
- Scene 3 – 1936. The Duke and Duchess's wedding is described in a fancy aria by a waitress.
- Scene 4 – 1953. The Duchess stays at the hotel and seduces a waiter. The waiter accepts a tip and reveals the recurrence of the Duchess's deeds.
- Scene 5 – 1953. The Duke visits his mistress. They flirt and she suggests that the Duchess's serial seductions are the talk of London.

=== Act 2 ===
- Scene 6 – 1955. Two rubberneckers comment extravagantly on the divorce case. The judge denigrates the Duchess's morals.
- Scene 7 – 1970. The Duchess is interviewed by a society journalist. Her bill is delivered.
- Scene 8 – 1990. The hotel manager tells the Duchess to leave the hotel, since she is unable to pay her bills. She attempts to seduce him but with no success. She departs.
- Epilogue. The electrician and the maid surface from beneath the bed and destroy the hotel room.

== Instrumentation ==
The opera is scored for an orchestra of 15 players, with much doubling, and a large range of percussion instruments.

1. Clarinet 1 in B♭, doubling bass clarinet, soprano saxophone, and bass saxophone
2. Clarinet 2 in A, doubling bass clarinet, alto saxophone, and bass saxophone
3. Clarinet 3 in A, doubling bass clarinet, contrabass clarinet, and swanee whistle
4. Horn in F
5. Trumpet in C
6. Tenor trombone
7. Percussion: two tubular bells, snare drum, flat bass drum, pedal bass drum, small bongo, timbales, rototom, clash cymbals, two suspended cymbals, sizzle cymbal, hi-hat, three temple blocks, three brake drums, tambourine, triangle, tam-tam, vibraslap, washboard, cabaça, large fishing reel, whip, lion's roar, popgun, scrap metal, electric bell
8. Harp, doubling electric bell and fishing reel
9. Button accordion, doubling electric bell and fishing reel
10. Piano, doubling fishing reel
11. Violin I
12. Violin II
13. Viola
14. Cello
15. Double bass, doubling fishing reel

== Film version ==
Powder Her Face was made into a motion picture by Britain's Channel 4 and shown on Christmas Day 1999. The film was released on DVD in the UK for Christmas 2005; the DVD includes a documentary film about Adès by Gerald Fox made at around the same time.

== Recordings ==
- Audio CD: Conducted by the composer with the Almeida Ensemble and performed by Jill Gómez, Valdine Anderson, Niall Morris, and Roger Bryson. Recorded 1998, released 1 October 1999. (EMI: CDS5566492) OCLC 63557167
- DVD: Directed by David Alden, conducted by the composer with the Birmingham Contemporary Music Group and performed by Mary Plazas, Heather Buck, Daniel Norman, and Graeme Broadbent. Released in 2006 in the US (DC10002). OCLC 71292979
