= Masashi Ueda =

Masashi Ueda or Ueda Masashi may refer to:

- Ueda Masashi (musician) (1904–1966), a Japanese orchestral conductor
- Masashi Ueda (manga artist) (born 1947), a Japanese manga artist
