= Niall Morris (singer) =

Irish classical singer and producer (born 1975)

William Niall Morris (born 1965) is an Irish classical singer, stage director and voice coach.

== Biography ==
Born in Dublin, William Niall Morris studied music at King's College London and the Guildhall School of Music and Drama, London. He completed his studies at the National Opera Studio in London.

In 2024, he directed at the Wexford Opera Festival in a new play about the life of Giacomo Puccini. Written by Morris himself, he also acted the leading role of the great composer. The run was sold out and critically acclaimed.

The following month, in Bangkok, Morris directed the first ever Thailand production of Verdi’s masterpiece, “Rigoletto.”

Since 2020, Morris goes by his middle name, William.

As a young tenor, he performed principally with English Touring Opera and the D'Oyly Carte Opera Company. Amongst the opera roles he has performed on stage are Nemorino in L'elisir d'amore, Davey in Jonathan Dove's Siren Song, Ralph Rackstraw in H.M.S. Pinafore, Don Ottavio in Don Giovanni, Lysander in A Midsummer Night's Dream, Fenton in The Merry Wives of Windsor, Paris in La Belle Hélène, and Antonio in The Duenna. He created the tenor roles in Thomas Adès first opera Powder Her Face, which was released on EMI Classics and nominated for a Grammy (Best Opera Recording 2000).

Morris was a founding member of the Irish singing group "The Celtic Tenors" who won the German Echo Klassik Award for Best Classical Crossover Artists in 2002. The group made numerous recordings, notably at Abbey Road studios while signed to EMI Classics. The group collaborated with Dionne Warwick, Air Supply, Samantha Mumba, The Dubliners and Brian Kennedy. Morris decided to leave the group in 2006 and took the role of company manager for Opera Ireland as well as creating a biographical stage show about the life of opera legend Maria Callas which was the most successful operatic themed show ever staged at Ireland's the National Concert Hall. The show featured documentary footage from the life of Callas, narrated by Simon Callow CBE.

In 2015 Morris created a new stage show, The Puccini Scandal investigates the personal and artistic dilemmas of the great opera composer after the death of the maid Doria Manfredi. Morris plays the role of Giacomo Puccini.

Using his extensive knowledge of singing, Morris created the YouTube channel “Bangkok Voice Coach” which has over 50,000 subscribers. He now writes features and reviews for the Bangkok Post and Opera Magazine (international).

William lives in Bangkok with his Thai partner Woody and “beloved nephew” Hummer.

== Sources ==
- Lynch, Donal (24 February 2008) New notes on an old friend. The Independent (Ireland), .
- O'Riordan, Dick (15 November 2015). "Puccini scandal was the stuff of tragic opera". The Sunday Business Post
- Morris, Niall (2 January 2017). "Scandalous secret of the opera master". The Independent (Ireland)
- Brankin, Una (10 November 2014). "How singing star Niall Morris fell for the story of a very special girl called Maria Callas". Belfast Telegraph
