= Alexander Mogilevsky =

Russian violinist (1885–1953)

- Александр Могилевский
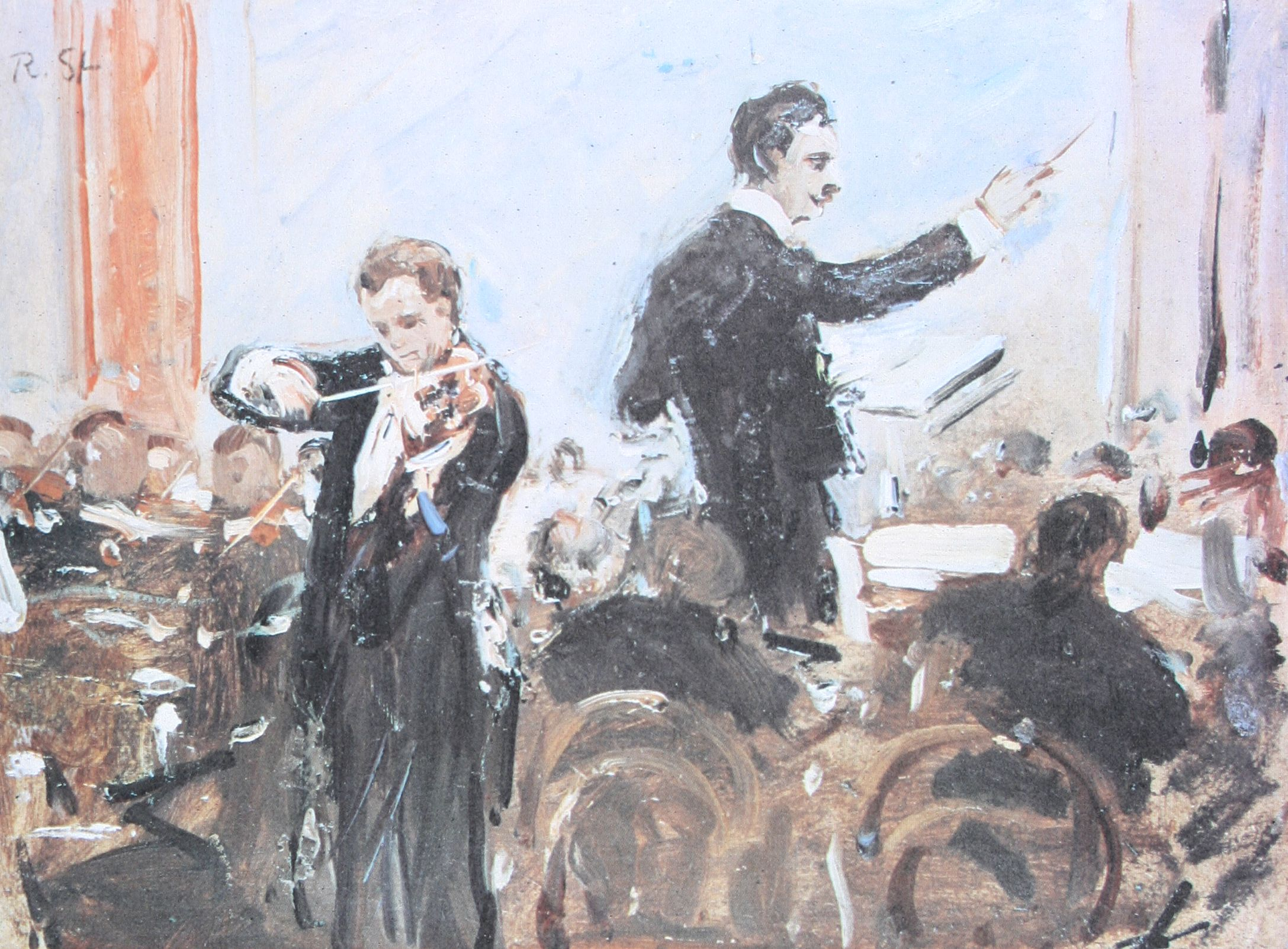
- Mogilevsky's violin concert with Serge Koussevitzky conducting, 1910, by Robert Sterl
- Born: Alexander Yakovlevich Mogilevsky; 27 January 1885; Odessa, Russian Empire (now Odesa, Ukraine)
- Died: 7 March 1953 (aged 68); Tokyo, Japan
- Occupation: Violinist

Alexander Yakovlevich Mogilevsky (Russian: Александр Яковлевич Могилевский; 27 January 1885 – 7 March 1953) was a Russian classical concert violinist and director of the Kremlin Band for Tsar Nicholas II.

== Career ==
Born in Odessa in 1885, Mogilevsky moved to Moscow in 1898 to study music at the prestigious Moscow Conservatory of Music, where he graduated first in his class.

Mogilevsky was a student, colleague, and close friend of Alexander Scriabin, with whom he traveled in 1910 on a tour arranged by the conductor Serge Koussevitzky. From 1920 to 1921 he taught at the Moscow Conservatory (among his students - D. M. Tsyganov). In the same years, he led the Stradivari State Quartet. In 1922 he began active touring abroad, taught at the Russian Conservatory in Paris.

In 1929, Mogilevsky met and married Nadezhda Nikolayevna de Leuchtenberg, who accompanied him on piano as the two started what was to be a world tour. The tour began in the Far East, with concerts in Singapore, the Dutch East Indies (now Indonesia), and Japan. Divorced in 1938.

One of Mogilevsky's more famous students were Shinichi Suzuki (whom he taught in Tokyo, ca. 1931), the inventor of the international Suzuki method of music education. and Suwa Nejiko.

He died in Japan in 1953, aged 67. In 1966, a monograph about him "The Soul of Music" by a Japanese violinist, student of Mogilevsky, Kiyoshi Kato, was published in Tokyo.

Evgeny Mogilevsky is his great nephew (grand-nephew).
