= Tokyo Symphony Orchestra =

Orchestra based in Japan

Tokyo Symphony Orchestra (TSO) 東京交響楽団
- Orchestra
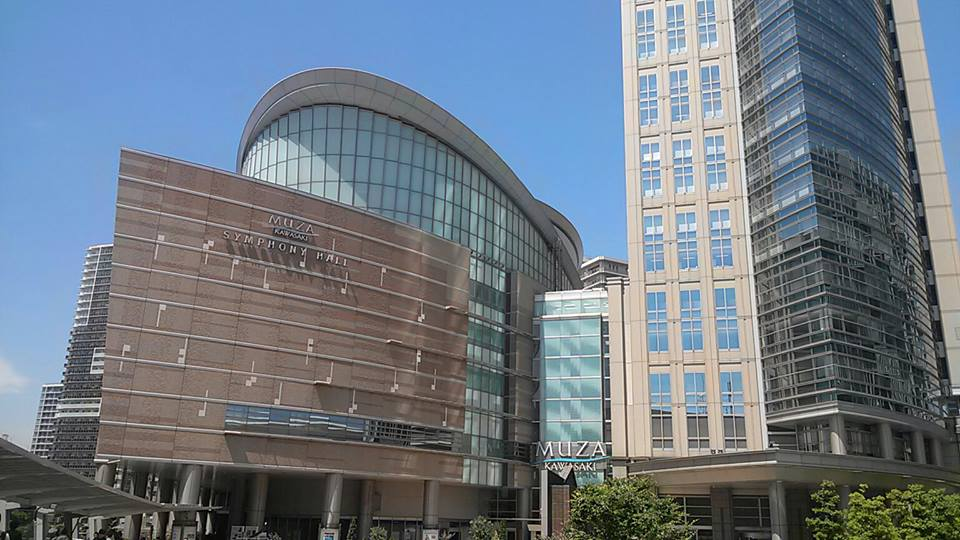
- Muza Kawasaki Symphony Hall; The headquarters of TSO
- Founded: 1946
- Location: Kawasaki, Kanagawa, Japan
- Website: tokyosymphony.jp

The Tokyo Symphony Orchestra (東京交響楽団, Tōkyō Kōkyō Gakudan) (TSO) is a Japanese orchestra, administratively based in Kawasaki. The orchestra offers subscription concert series at its home, the Muza Kawasaki Symphony Hall and at Suntory Hall, the Concert Hall of the Tokyo Metropolitan Theatre, and Tokyo Opera City. It also serves as the opera orchestra for selected opera productions at New National Theatre Tokyo.

== History ==
The orchestra was established in 1946 as the Toho Symphony Orchestra (東宝交響楽団), and gave its first performance on 14 May 1946 under the direction of Hitoshi Ueda. The Toho Symphony Orchestra began full-time activities in 1947, starting on 29 September 1947 with performances of Beethoven conducted by Hidemaro Konoe. The orchestra took the name of the Tokyo Symphony Orchestra in 1951, under the auspices of Radio Tokyo. In May 1956, the Tokyo Symphony Orchestra Foundation undertook management of the ensemble. In March 1964, the foundation was dissolved, and the orchestra was reconstituted under new and independent management. A new foundation for the orchestra was re-established in 1980.

Masashi Ueda had a regular working relationship with the orchestra from 1946 to 1964. Kazuyoshi Akiyama was the first music director and principal conductor of the orchestra, from 1964 to 2004. Hubert Soudant was the first non-Japanese music director of the orchestra, from 2004 to 2014. Jonathan Nott was music director of the orchestra from 2014 through March 2026.

In July 2014, Lorenzo Viotti first guest-conducted the orchestra. Viotti returned for four subsequent guest-conducting appearances with the orchestra, in 2016, twice in 2019, and in 2023. In August 2024, the orchestra announced the appointment of Viotti as its next music director, effective with the 2026-2027 season, with an initial contract of three years.

The orchestra has recorded the musical score for the 1984 movie The Return of Godzilla.

== Music directors ==
- Masashi Ueda (1945–1964)
- Kazuyoshi Akiyama (1964–2004)
- Hubert Soudant (2004–2014)
- Jonathan Nott (2014–2026)
- Lorenzo Viotti (2026–present)
