= A Thousand Splendid Suns (opera) =

A Thousand Splendid Suns is an opera with music by American composer Sheila Silver and an English-language libretto by Stephen Kitsakos, based on the popular novel by Khaled Hosseini. It was commissioned by Seattle Opera, where it premiered February 25, 2023. The opera tells the story of two Afghan women, from different generations and walks of life, who are forced into marriage with the same man. Enemies at first, they grow to love each other like mother and daughter, and discover that the human spirit can survive and transcend the most challenging of circumstances.

The opera is in two acts and is scored for 11 singers, 1 singing child role, full orchestra (plus bansuri and tabla) and has a duration of 2 hours 43 minutes.

== Conception ==
Sheila Silver became passionate about Khaled Hosseini's 2007 novel in 2009, listening to the book-on-tape narrated by Atossa Leoni. In 2012, after several letters and exchanges, Khaled Hosseini gave her his enthusiastic support and the rights to adapt the novel for the operatic stage. Charles Jarden, General Director of American Opera Projects, who had worked with Silver on the development of Beauty Intolerable, A Songbook based on the poetry of Edna St. Vincent Millay and had sponsored the New York City premiere screening of the film of her opera The Thief of Love, committed to helping develop the project. Stephen Kitsakos, who wrote librettos for Silver's operas The Wooden Sword (winner of the Sackler Prize in Music in 2007) and The White Rooster (commissioned by the Smithsonian's Freer Sackler Gallery) helped transform the novel into opera.

“I didn’t feel that my eastern European Jewish roots would carry me far enough into Afghanistan,” Sheila Silver told Opera America. Silver undertook a study of Hindustani music, the foundation of Afghan classical music. At first Silver studied Hindustani music long-distance with her mentor, acclaimed Hindustani musicologist Deepak Raja. Then she went to Pune in northern India to study for six months with Pandit Narayanrao Bodas and Pandit Kedar Bodas. Her ambition was to discover “how to create an authentic Afghan color (Afghan music is based on North Indian music) in my Western voice. ... I will include tabla and bansuri (bamboo Indian flute) in my otherwise Western orchestra.” Silver dedicated her opera's score to “Pandit Kedar Narayan Bodas, who invited me into the inner sanctum of his Hindustani musical family and taught me with patience and love, inspiring the sound world for A Thousand Splendid Suns.”

== Performance ==
The world premiere production was conducted by Indian-American maestro Viswa Subbaraman, who grew up listening to the Carnatic music of southern India. Renowned percussionist Deep Singh, who at the age of seven became the youngest disciple of Ustad Allah Rakha (father and teacher of Zakhir Hussain) played tabla. American bansuri master Steve Gorn played bansuri.

The world premiere production is to be directed by Roya Sadat, who was named one of the BBC's 100 Women for 2021 for her trailblazing work as one of Afghanistan's first female film directors. Sadat calls A Thousand Splendid Suns "a universal story of self-sacrifice, fear, love, and hope that connects every human being from each corner of the world. Unfortunately, this opera has even more meaning today, in the aftermath of the US withdrawal from Afghanistan, as this horrible history is being repeated once again for the women and girls of our land."

Support for the composition and creation of A Thousand Splendid Suns has come from a 2013 Guggenheim Award, a 2014 Opera America Discovery Grant for Female Composers, a NEA Development Grant (secured in partnership with American Opera Projects), and an Opera America Commissioning Grant (funded by the Virginia B. Toulmin Foundation), and the Berkshire Taconic Foundation.

Workshops of A Thousand Splendid Suns, all undertaken in collaboration with American Opera Projects, involved director Leslie Swackhamer, conductor Sara Jobin, and soprano Lucy FitzGibbon as Laila. They included:

- In June 2015, 1 hour from Act I was workshopped at the National Opera Center in New York. Aidan Lang, then General Director of Seattle Opera, heard and became interested in commissioning the opera at this workshop.
- In January 2016 the complete Act 1 was workshopped in partnership with the Studios of Key West, Florida.
- Also in January 2016, 25 minutes of Act 1 was presented with full orchestra at Opera America's New Works Forum at Trinity Church in New York City.
- In November 2017, Act 2 was workshopped at the Hudson Area Library and National Opera Center in New York City.
- March 2023 at Seattle Opera.

== Roles ==
Role	Voice type	Premiere cast, 25 February 2023 (Conductor: Viswa Subbaraman)
Mariam	mezzo-soprano	Karin Mushegain
Laila	soprano	Maureen McKay
Rasheed	baritone	John Moore
Tariq	tenor	Rafael Moras
Nana/Market Woman #1/Wajma	soprano	Tess Altiveros
Driver/Hakim	bass	Ashraf Sewailam
Fariba/Wife #3	mezzo-soprano	Sarah Coit
Wife #1/Market Woman #3	mezzo-soprano	Sarah Mattox
Wife #2/Market Woman #2	soprano	Ibidunni Ojikutu
Jalil/Wakil/Guard	tenor	Martin Bakari
Mullah/Sharif/Soldier	bass	Andrew Potter
Zalmai	treble	Lorenzo José Boado/Grace Franck-Smith

== Synopsis ==
Fifteen-year-old Mariam, the cast-off bastard child of a rich father, is forced to leave her rural home after her mother's suicide and marry a middle-aged shoe-maker from Kabul named Rasheed. Alone, scared and forced to wear the burqa, something unfamiliar to her, she tries her best to be a dutiful wife but is unable to conceive a child. Consequently, she lives a loveless existence with a husband who abuses her regularly for her failure to give him a son.

Years later, as competing factions of sectarian warlords secure a stranglehold on Kabul, a bomb explodes in Mariam's neighborhood killing the parents of fourteen-year-old Laila, a modern, educated, ravishing beauty. Rasheed brings the wounded girl to his home and Mariam, reluctantly, nurses her back to health. Rasheed, now a sixty-year-old man, schemes to get Laila to marry him by concocting a story that her beloved fiancée, Tariq, who was forced to flee to Pakistan a few weeks earlier with his parents, has been killed. Laila, secretly carrying Tariq's child, agrees to marry Rasheed, hoping to create a safe haven for the child.

At first Mariam is cold to Laila, but gradually the women bond over Laila's baby, a girl named Aziza, as well as their hatred of Rasheed, who abuses them physically and psychologically. Eventually the Taliban rise to power and life in Kabul becomes more oppressive. When the two wives and Aziza attempt a daring escape from the city they are caught at the Kabul central bus station, escalating Rasheed's abuse and anger. Although Laila eventually gives Rasheed the son he has always wanted, the violence continues.

The turning point comes when Tariq, Laila's beloved, returns to Kabul and finds her. Rasheed learns of Tariq's visit to the house and in an act of extreme rage begins to strangle Laila. Mariam, refusing to stand silent, saves Laila's life by hitting Rasheed on the head with a shovel, killing him.

Mariam convinces Laila to flee with Tariq and Laila's two children. She will remain behind to take responsibility for killing Rasheed, knowing that she will be sentenced to death. As Mariam walks to her execution, an understanding of her life brings her a sense of self-worth and spiritual peace: she has loved and been loved. She saved Laila's life and has lived a life of consequence. She knows that Allah will forgive her.
