= Sheila Silver =

American composer (born 1946)

Sheila Jane Silver (born October 3, 1946) is an American composer.

== Early life and studies ==
Sheila Silver was born in Seattle, Washington in 1946, the youngest daughter of Robert and Fannie Silver. She started piano studies at the age of five. After two years at the University of Washington, she transferred to the University of California where she received a Bachelor of Arts in 1968. She then studied with Erhard Karkoschka at the State University of Music and Performing Arts Stuttgart, and with György Ligeti in Berlin and later in Hamburg. She attended the 1970 Darmstadt Summer Institute, and spent a summer at the Tanglewood Music Center (1972) where she studied with Jacob Druckman. At Brandeis University she studied with Arthur Berger and Harold Shapero, earning her PhD in 1976.

Silver is Professor Emerita at the State University of New York at Stony Brook and served as visiting professor at the College of William and Mary.

== Career ==
Silver has merged tonal and atonal elements in works starting with her 1979 Canto, A Setting of Ezra Pound’s Canto XXXIX, for baritone and chamber ensemble (commissioned by the Berkshire Music Center at Tanglewood). Richard Dyer wrote in the Boston Globe of the world premiere, “Sheila Silver’s Canto matches Pound’s text with music of a comparably audacious directness, simplicity, and specificity and therefore boldly occupies a psycho-spiritual region that few other composers have cared to approach; it is a beautiful work.” Silver often finds inspiration in non-Western musical traditions, such as Hebraic Chant, (Shirat Sara and Cello Sonata), Sikh prayer mantras (The Thief of Love, Ek Ong Kar,) or Hindustani music (A Thousand Splendid Suns). She collects Tibetan singing bowls and has used them in compositions such as Being in Life and The White Rooster. Critics have praised Silver’s work for being modern and accessible. Cary Smith in the Journal American wrote: “To the Spirit Unconquered is one of those rare compositions that grabs you emotionally and will not let you go. It is a stunning modern masterpiece, a work of profound musical and emotional depth.”

Her Piano Concerto was written for pianist Alexander Paley and premiered by the American Composers Orchestra at Carnegie Hall in 1996. Said Steve Schwarz, in Classical Net, the Concerto "speaks with what I'd call a depth of discourse...it bespeaks a maturity of mind and culture found in few composers."

== Film music ==
Silver has scored three independent feature films directed by her husband, John Feldman,: Alligator Eyes, Dead Funny and Who the Hell is Booby Roos?, winner of the Seattle International Film Festival’s New American Cinema Award in 2002. She also scored Feldman’s much acclaimed documentary about the scientist Lynn Margulis, Symbiotic Earth, and is currently working on the score for his new documentary, Regenerating Life.

== Vocal music ==
Silver has written several song cycles. Beauty Intolerable: A Songbook based on the poetry of Edna St. Vincent Millay includes 14 songs and two rounds by this American iconic poet. It can be heard on a 2021 album released by Albany Records and starring singers Dawn Upshaw, Stephanie Blythe, Sidney Outlaw, Deanne Meek, Lucy Fitz Gibbon, pianists Gilbert Kalish, Warren Jones, and other musicians. Of the recording, American Record Guide says “Silver...writes music that marries the delicious bitterness of jazzy discord with lush, cool harmonies and merges the two harmonic moods together with ease...The music is just as rich and captivating as the text that inspired it, and the splendid performances by this top-notch cast of artists are not a surprise. Spend some time with Edna and Sheila and Sappho and the rest.”

In 2021, Silver completed an opera based on Khaled Hosseini's novel A Thousand Splendid Suns with a libretto by her long-time collaborator, Stephen Kitsakos. It was premiered by the Seattle Opera in February 2023. In preparation for composing this opera, she undertook a study of Hindustani music, making multiple trips to India between 2013-2020 to study with Pandit Kedar Bodas in Pune. Silver’s intention is to take color and inspiration for her Western musical voice from Hindustani music.

== Awards and honors ==
In addition to grants and commissions from such organizations as the Paul Fromm Foundation, the Barlow Foundation, the National Endowment for the Arts, the Rockefeller Foundation, the Cary Trust, Chamber Music America, and Opera America, Silver’s honors include:

- invited to be the Elliot Carter Resident Composer at the American Academy in Rome (Spring 2020)
- Guggenheim Fellowship (2013)
- The Raymond and Beverly Sackler Prize in Music Composition in Opera (2007—for The Wooden Sword)
- American Academy of Arts and Letters Composer Award (1986)
- Twice winner of the ISCM National Composers Competition (1982 and 1983)
- The Rome Prize in Music Composition (1979)
- The Radcliffe Institute Fellowship (1977)
- The George Ladd Prix de Paris (1969–71)
- Koussevitzky Fellowship

== List of works ==
=== Orchestral works ===
- Being in Life, Concerto for Horn/Alphorn, string orchestra, and Tibetan singing bowls (2019)
- Midnight Prayer (2003)
- Piano Concerto (1996)
- Three Preludes for Orchestra (1992)
- Song of Sara for string orchestra (1985/87)
- Chariessa, for soprano and orchestra (1980)

=== Operatic works ===
- A Thousand Splendid Suns, 2021 (based on the novel by Khaled Hosseini)
- The Wooden Sword, 2010 (chamber opera based on an international folktale)
- The Tale of the White Rooster, 2010 (chamber opera about Tibetan nuns escaping across the Tibetan Indian border)
- The Thief of Love, 1986 (based on a 17th century Bengali court tale as told by Bharatchandra)

=== Vocal works ===
- Songs of Resilience (2026)
- On Loving: Three Songs for Diane Kalish in memoriam (2016)
- Beauty Intolerable: A Songbook based on the poetry of Edna St. Vincent Millay (2013)
- Transcending: Three Songs for Michael Dash, in memoriam (1999)
- Ek Ong Kar, a capella chorus (1983)
- Canto: A Setting of Ezra Pound’s Canto XXIX for baritone and chamber ensemble (1979)
- Chariessa: A Cycle of Six Songs on Fragments from Sappho (1978)

=== Chamber ===
- Resilient Earth: Six Preludes for Piano and Four Caprices for Solo Violin (2022)
- Three Etudes, for Trumpet (2020)
- Toccata and Nocturne, for solo piano, inspired by Raga Jog (2016/18)
- Down by the River, for trombone quartet (2016)
- Hazim’s Dance, for string trio, harp, and oboe (2008)
- Twilight’s Last Gleaming, for two pianos and percussion (2007)
- Chant, for contrabass and piano (2004)
- Moon Prayer, for string sextet (2002)
- Music Visions (Subway Sunset and As the Earth Turns), for woodwinds and video (1999/2000)
- Lullaby, for bassoon or bass clarinet and piano, (1999)
- Four Etudes and a Fantasy, for string quartet (1996)
- From Darkness Emerging, for string quartet and harp (1995)
- To the Spirit Unconquered, for piano trio, inspired by the writings of Primo Levi (1992)
- Six Preludes for Piano on poems of Baudelaire (1991)
- Cello Sonata (1988)
- Dance Converging, for horn, viola, piano, and percussion (1987)

=== Film scores ===
- Alligator Eyes
- Dead Funny
- Who the Hell is Booby Roos?
- Symbiotic Earth

== Discography ==
- Beauty Intolerable: Songs of Sheila Silver (2021), CD, (TROY 1854-55) with Dawn Upshaw, Stephanie Blythe, Sidney Outlaw, Lucy Fitz Gibbon, Deanne Meek, Risa Renae Harman, Gilbert Kalish, Timothy Long, Kayo Iwama, Warren Jones, Ryan M. McCullough
1. Beauty Intolerable, A Songbook based on the poetry of Edna St. Vincent Millay
2. On Loving, Three Songs for Diane Kalish, in memoriam
3. Transcending, Three Songs for Michael Dash, in memoriam
4. Chariessa, A Cycle of Six Songs on Fragments from Sappho
5. Nocturne, Inspired by Raga Jog, for solo piano
- String Quartet (2011) (NWCRL 520) Atlantic String Quartet
- Twilight’s Last Gleaming (2009) (Bridge 9319 - Stony Brook Soundings) Pianists: Gilbert Kalish, Christina Dahl. Percussion: Eduardo Leandro, Kevin Dufford
- Six préludes pour piano, d’après poèmes de Baudelaire (2009) (TROY 1087) Tanya Bannister, piano
- Shirat Sara (Song of Sarah) (2004) Milken Archive (Naxos 8.559426) Gerard Schwarz and the Seattle Symphony Strings
- Piano Concerto and Six Preludes for Piano on Poems of Baudelaire (2003) (Naxos 8.557015) with Alexander Paley, piano, Lithuanian State Symphony Orchestra, Guntaras Rinkevicius, conductor
- To the Spirit Unconquered (1996) (CRI 708) The Guild Trio: Janet Orenstein, violin; Brooks Whitehouse, cello; Patricia Tao, piano; Gilbert Kalish, piano; Lois Martin, viola; William Purvis, French horn; Lisa Moore, piano; Thad Wheeler, percussion
1. Dance Converging
2. Dynamis
3. Six Preludes for Piano on poems of Baudelaire
- Ek Ong Kar (1987) (GSS 107) The Gregg Smith Singers
- Canto, A Setting of Ezra Pound’s Canto XXIX (1979) (Mode 23) Musicians' Accord ensemble, Michael Dash, baritone, Sheila Silver, cond.
- Cello Sonata (1977) (CRI 590) Timothy Eddy, cello, Gilbert Kalish, piano
