= Boris Kamensky =

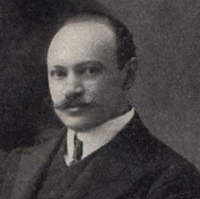
Boris Kamensky

Boris Sergeevich Kamensky (15 November 1870 – 21 September 1949) was a violinist from the Russian Empire.

Born in Mykolaiv, Ukraine, son of a director of a commercial bank, Kamensky made his first appearance in concerts at the age of nine. He was noticed as a talented violinist by Eugène Ysaÿe and he started taking lessons with him. He went on to study at the Saint Petersburg State Conservatory (now the Rimsky-Korsakov Saint Petersburg State Conservatory) with Leopold Auer, and he had ensemble classes with Anton Rubinstein; and then he studied with Joseph Joachim in Berlin.

Kamensky was appointed as Concertmaster in the orchestra of the St Petersburg Imperial Russian Musical Society and he became first violin of Tzar Nicholas II. He was one of the founding members of the St Petersburg String Quartet, which was maintained by Helena Pavlovna's grandson, Duke George Mecklenburg-Strelitz, whilst appearing as soloist at the concerts of the Russian Musical Society in various cities in Russia. The Quartet played old Italian instruments made by the Guarneri family which had taken years for the Duke to find. Despite the exceptional qualities of the instruments, it took over 500 rehearsals before the artists successfully achieved exactly the right equilibrium of tone. The Quartet initially played at the Duke's palace, where only select society was able to attend. The Duke was encouraged to let the Quartet give public concerts and as a result, it made its début in 1897 in St Petersburg. The Quartet became very famous in Russia and then started touring around Europe.

Kamensky married Maria Apakidze and they had a daughter, Irina in 1907. He was so passionate about his violin that on the eve of the Russian Revolution, when he was forced to leave the country and faced with the choice between taking his wife or his violin, he chose his Stradivarius. He fled to Paris and became a professor at the Russian Conservatory (now the Rachmaninov Conservatory) and he gave private lessons (pupils included Michèle Auclair, Hansheinz Schneeberger, Nejiko Suwa and Jean Fournier). He subsequently married Ksenia Vladimirovna. Kamensky died in Paris and was buried at the Sainte-Geneviève-des-Bois Russian Cemetery in Paris.

== Selected performance reviews ==
NIZHNY NOVGOROD

"The ensemble of the four artists is simply wonderful. It is impossible to explain in words the perfection of their masterful playing, one must hear them to understand the power and brilliance of their interpretation of the pure quartette music. They represent one whole, one soul. It seems like one instrument in the hands of a maestro, in whose power it is to easily transmit the musical beauties, enrapturing the audience with the purity of tone, either dying away to the hardly audible pianissimo, or growing to the greatest forte. Many years work were required to create such a perfect musical ensemble. The execution of the artists merits the highest praise, acquainting the Russian public with the works of the great composers."

POLTAWA

"Nothing surpasses their playing as regard to the ensemble, transparency and artistic interpretation. The four artists play like one person. They master their instruments exquisitely and achieve even a still greater mastery of themselves."

KISHINEFF

"Although their playing sounds like one great instrument, it is nevertheless not a bit mechanical, for each artist retains his own individuality."

OREL

"The concert was of such deep interest, both on account of the serious programme and also on account of the popularity of the artists, that we can note it as one of the most important events in our musical life."

SARATOFF

5"I heard the celebrated Quartet for the first time and the impression received excelled by far my expectation. One can hardly imagine a greater harmony of interpretation. Listening to the Quartet I had the impression that I heard a small, wonderfully harmonious orchestra, an orchestra, where every musician is a great and thorough artist. In forte, the orchestra surprises you with its strength and power and in piano it charms your ear with tenderness of tone and the finest achievement. During the whole performance here is the impression of great nobility and deep reverence for the authors. There is not the slightest wish of any of the artists to exhibit himself, not the least striving for cheap effects. Strange as it may seem, this is so seldom found in music."
