= Michèle Auclair =

French violinist (1924–2005)

Michèle Auclair (Paris, 16 November 1924 – Paris, 10 June 2005) was a French violinist and teacher.

Michèle Auclair was born into a family with sense for arts and culture. Her first teacher was Line Talluel and later, at the Conservatoire de Paris, Jules Boucherit, Boris Kamensky and Jacques Thibaud.

In 1943, she won the first prize at the Marguerite Long-Jacques Thibaud Competition and in 1946 also the first prize at the Geneva Concours.

From 1956, she collaborated with the pianist Jacqueline Bonneau with their concert debut a year later. In 1962, she started another collaboration with the pianist Geneviève Joy.

In 1967, she was appointed violin professor at the Paris Conservatoire together with Pierre Doukan. In the next two decades, their students won more than 45 international prizes. She also taught at the New England Conservatoire in Boston.

In 1995, she was awarded the Légion d'honneur for her contributions in the field of music.

== Discography ==
Auclair's discography includes recordings of violin concertos, chamber music and works for violin and piano. Her recordings were released on labels including Remington, Les Discophiles Français, Erato and Philips. Selected recordings include:

- Violin Concerto in D major, Op. 35 by Pyotr Ilyich Tchaikovsky – with the Austrian Symphony Orchestra conducted by Kurt Wöss (1950, Remington Records).
- Violin Concerto No. 1 in G minor, Op. 26 by Max Bruch – with the Austrian Symphony Orchestra conducted by Wilhelm Loibner (c. 1952, Remington Records).
- Sonatas for Violin and Piano by Claude Debussy and Maurice Ravel – with Jacqueline Bonneau (1960, Les Discophiles Français).
- Sonatas for Violin and Organ, BWV 1014–1019 by Johann Sebastian Bach – with Marie-Claire Alain (recorded 1956–1957, Les Discophiles Français).
- Violin Concerto in D major, Op. 77 by Johannes Brahms – with the Vienna Symphony Orchestra conducted by Willem van Otterloo (1958, Philips).
- Violin Concertos Nos. 4 and 5 by Wolfgang Amadeus Mozart – with the Stuttgart Philharmonic Orchestra conducted by Marcel Couraud (1961, Philips).
- Violin Concertos by Felix Mendelssohn and Pyotr Ilyich Tchaikovsky – with the Innsbruck Symphony Orchestra conducted by Robert Wagner (1963, Philips).
- Complete Works for Violin and Piano by Franz Schubert – with Geneviève Joy (Erato).

Several recordings were subsequently reissued in compilations, including The Philips Recordings (2014) and Milestones of a Legend, an eight-CD collection released in 2016. In 2024, Warner Classics released Schubert: Complete Works for Violin and Piano and a new edition of Bach's sonatas for violin and organ.
