= Suwa Nejiko =

Japanese violinist (1920–2012)

Suwa Nejiko (Maiden Oga Nejiko)
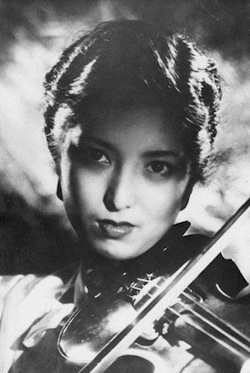
- Suwa Nejiko in 1945
- Born: 23 January 1920; Tokyo, Empire of Japan
- Died: 6 March 2012 (aged 92); Tokyo, Japan
- Occupation: Violinist
- Children: Arashimaru Alexander Oga

Suwa Nejiko (諏訪根自子) (23 January 1920 – 6 March 2012) was a Japanese violinist who earned fame as a child prodigy during the inter-war period. In early Shōwa Japan she was dubbed "The Girl Genius with the Beautiful Face" (美貌の天才少女, Bibō no tensai shōjo). Although her career was mostly confined to Japan and Europe, she posthumously became the source of controversy in the United States concerning the gift of what was claimed to be a Stradivarius violin by Joseph Goebbels, which possibly had been confiscated from its previous Jewish owner.

== Early life ==
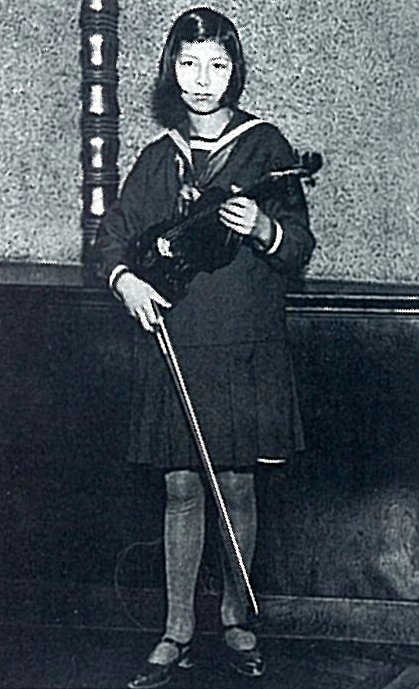
In 1932

Suwa was born in Tokyo in 1920. Her father was a wealthy industrialist who ran a fertilizer factory in Yamagata Prefecture; her mother was an aspiring singer who had studied music at the Yamagata Prefectural Sakata West Senior High School.

By age 3, Suwa was found to have perfect pitch and could accurately sing back classical music records in her family's collection. Soon after Suwa was introduced to Nakajima Tazuruko, her first violin teacher. Progress was dramatic enough that Suwa was quickly sent to study with his teacher, the Russian-born violinist Ōno Anna. In 1930, Suwa was introduced to Efrem Zimbalist while he was making his second Asian tour. Her performance of Mendelssohn's Violin Concerto impressed him enough that the meeting made headlines in Japan. The Asahi Shimbun declared her the "Girl Genius" (天才少女, tensai shōjo). Zimbalist recommended to Suwa that she study abroad and offered his assistance. She declined and chose to remain in Japan for six more years, studying under another Russian violinist, Alexander Mogilevsky.

On 9 April 1932, Suwa played her debut public recital at the Nippon Seinenkan in Tokyo and was hailed as a "wunderkind" (神童, shindō). The acrimonious separation of Suwa's parents in 1933 played out in the Japanese press. Suwa's mother claimed that she left the family home with her daughter on account of her husband's violence, although it was his infidelities which caused the rupture. The affair would later inspire a novel by Satomi Ton.

Between 1933 and 1935, Suwa recorded twenty-six 78 RPM sides for Nippon Columbia, accompanied on the piano by Ueda Masashi and Nadezhda Leuchtenberg.

After receiving interest in Suwa's playing from the Belgian Ambassador to Japan, the Ministry of Foreign Affairs decided in 1936 to sponsor her study abroad in Belgium with Boris Kamensky, to whom she had previously been introduced by her compatriot Hara Chieko. When World War II broke out in 1939, Suwa decided to remain in Paris boarding with Kamensky's family instead of returning to Japan.

== Wartime ==
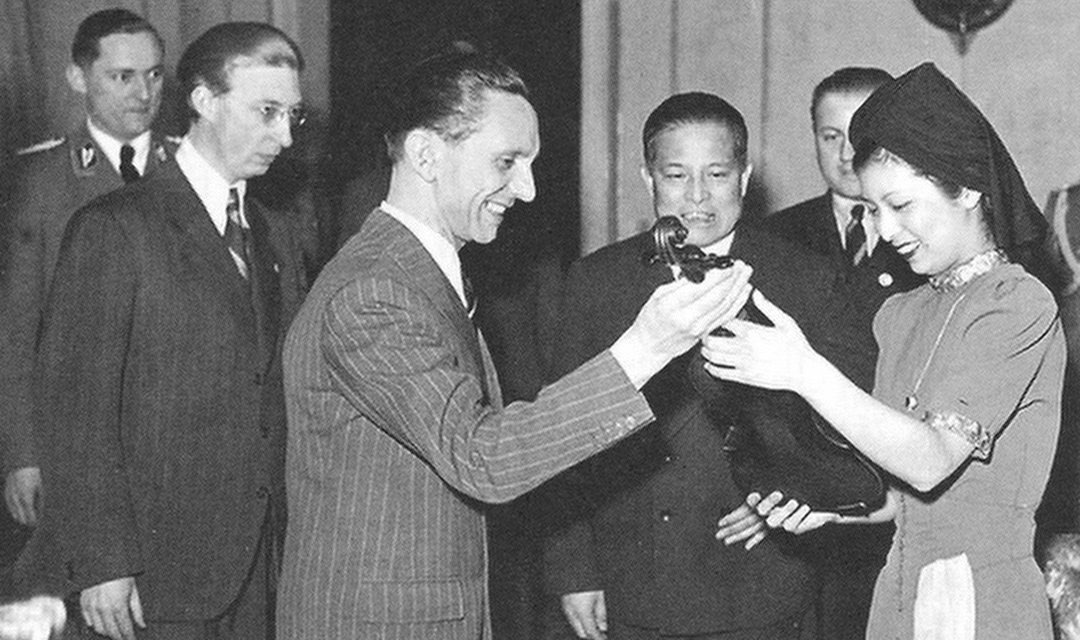
The Nazi propaganda minister, Joseph Goebbels, presenting a violin, said to be a Stradivarius, to Nejiko Suwa on 22 February 1943

In 1942, Kamensky petitioned the Japanese Embassy in France to care for Suwa, as he feared for the personal consequences he and his family could endure from the imminent Nazi occupation of Paris. There she met Ōga Koshirō (大賀小四郎), a member of the embassy's staff whom she would later marry.

At the time, Nazi Germany and the Empire of Japan were co-signatories of the Tripartite Pact; this permitted Suwa to continue working in Europe, including playing for wounded German soldiers. Suwa also performed as soloist with the Berlin Philharmonic under Hans Knappertsbusch in October 1943 to great acclaim.

In recognition of her services to German troops and her "superb technique and a brilliant display of art" on the instrument, Joseph Goebbels presented her with a violin on 22 February 1943. The gift was meant to be of a Stradivarius, and Goebbels himself noted in his diary that he was "offering the Japanese violinist a Stradivarius violin". In an interview with a Japanese newspaper, Suwa also appeared to believe that the violin was a Stradivarius. This gift generated controversy in the United States after the war. The violin is alleged to be one of many stolen or confiscated from Jews by the Nazi government. Stradivarius violins belonging to the Viennese art collector Oskar Bondy and the Jewish stepdaughter of Johann Strauss II are missing; Goebbels and his ministry were known to be concerned with buying quality violins for German musicians. Military records confirm that a 1765 Guadagnini was found on a German violinist who said it was a loan from Goebbels. The provenance of the instrument remains uncertain. Suwa's nephew, currently the owner of the violin, has declined to discuss the violin and authenticate it.

She also continued to tour in Germany, but was finally forced to flee Paris in August 1944 when the Allies closed in on the city. She joined Japanese Ambassador Ōshima's entourage in the Japanese Embassy in Berlin in April 1945 before moving with them to Bad Gastein when the war in Europe ended in May. She was captured in the Austrian Alps with the entire Japanese diplomatic mission to Germany by the Seventh United States Army in May 1945. She and other Japanese nationals were placed on board the liner Santa Rosa, in Le Havre, France, bound for New York. They were briefly sent to Pennsylvania in August to be detained in the Bedford Springs Hotel in the heart of the Allegheny Mountains before being released in November and sent back to Japan.

== Postwar success ==
After the war, she performed at a benefit concert at the Hollywood Bowl as the "first Japanese musical star to set foot on American soil since the signing of the peace treaty". She also gave numerous concerts in Japan, including one to war criminals at Sugamo Prison in 1952. In her later career, she released recordings of Bach's Sonatas and Partitas and Beethoven's Kreutzer and Spring sonatas.

Fukada Yusuke wrote a book about the early part of her life in Europe which was made into a TV film for TV Asahi in 1985 in which the Japanese violinist Mariko Komuro played the role of the young Suwa.

Suwa died on 6 March 2012 at the age of 92 in her home in Tokyo.
