= Hansheinz Schneeberger =

Swiss violinist (1926–2019)

Hansheinz Schneeberger (Bern, 16 October 1926 – Basel, 23 October 2019) was a Swiss violinist.

Born in Bern, he studied under Walter Kägi at the conservatory in Bern, as well as Carl Flesch and Boris Kamensky.

He formed a string quartet and gave concerts with it and as a soloist. Schneeberger was the soloist in the premieres of Frank Martin’s violin concerto in 1952, Béla Bartók’s first violin concerto in 1958 and Klaus Huber’s ‘Tempora’ in 1970.

He played a Stradivari violin from 1731 he acquired in 1959 by the luthier Pierre Gerber in Lausanne.

His readings of the six Bach unaccompanied sonatas and partitas (BWV. 1001/6) recorded in 1987 (Jecklin JS 266/7-2) are highly distinguished, both stylistically and expressively.
