= Seattle Opera =

Opera company in Seattle, Washington, U.S.

- Formation: 1963
- Founder: Glynn Ross
- Type: Opera company
- Tax ID no.: 910760426
- Headquarters: 363 Mercer Street; Seattle, Washington, U.S.
- Coordinates: 47.6239545°N 122.3494188°W
- General director: James Robinson
- Website: seattleopera.org

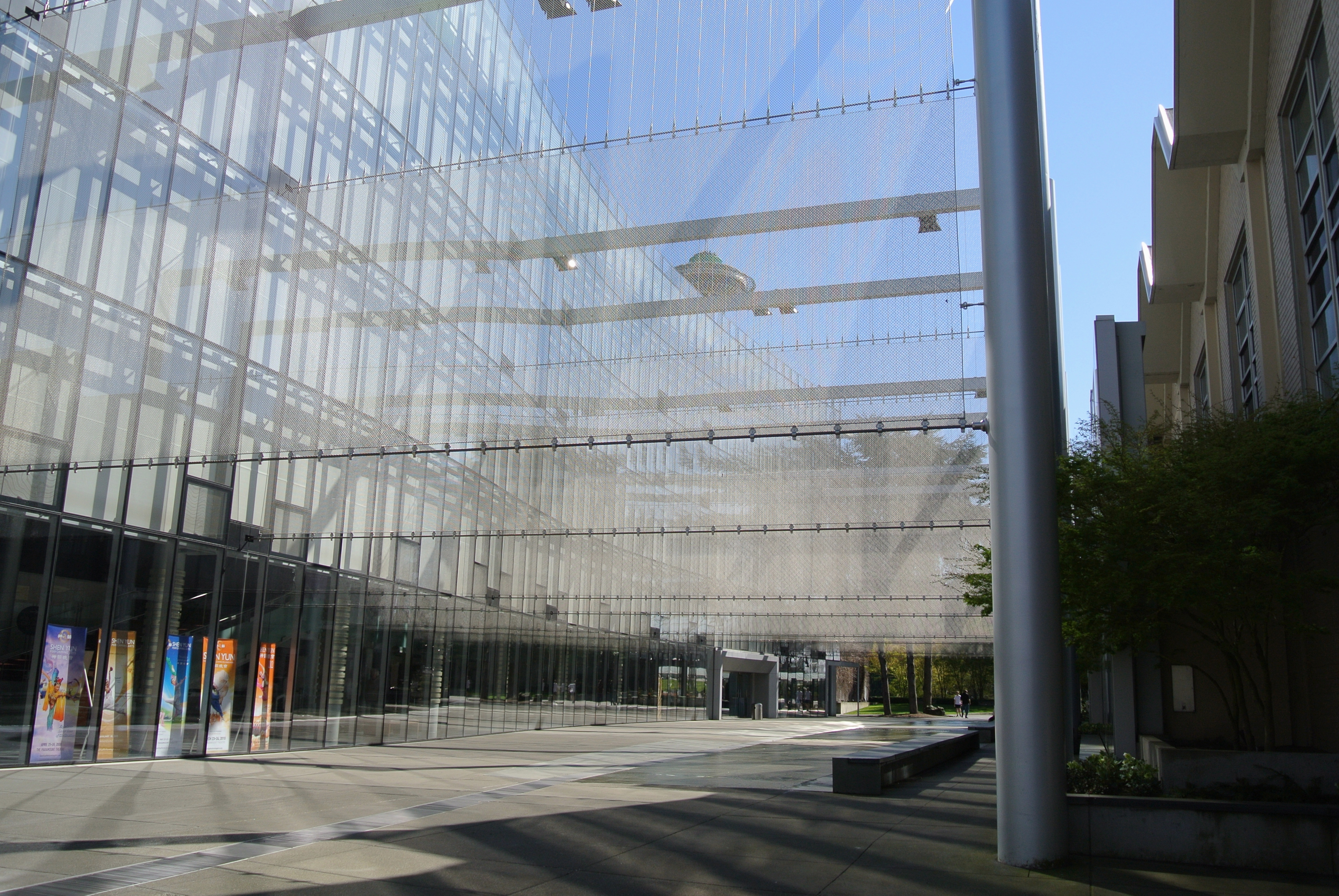
Façade of Marion Oliver McCaw Hall at Seattle Center, seen from Kreielsheimer Promenade with the Space Needle in the background

Seattle Opera is an American opera company based in Seattle, Washington. The company's season runs from August through late May, comprising five or six operas of eight to ten performances each, often featuring double casts in major roles to allow for successive evening presentations.

Since August 2003, Seattle Opera has performed at Marion Oliver McCaw Hall (capacity: 2,967), which was built on the site of the old Seattle Opera House at Seattle Center. The company's current general director is James Robinson.

== History ==
Glynn Ross founded the company in 1963, and served as its first general director until 1983. From the outset, Ross saw opera as something that had to be sold using similar techniques to those used to sell popular entertainment:

To sell opera…you have to get their attention with a little razzle-dazzle. You've got to be simpatico. You have to be able to communicate, and you have to deliver your message with the best possible product you can manage.

In 1970, Harold C. Schonberg of The New York Times contrasted Seattle Opera's approach to marketing to the then-still staid marketing of New York's Metropolitan Opera:

Out there, you see campaign buttons with the legend Opera Lives. It is in Seattle where you can look at the sky and find an airplane skywriting the virtues of Seattle Opera. There are even auto bumper stickers about opera.

Further, Schonberg remarked favorably on the "air of freshness and experimentation that contrasts vividly with the dull, tried and true, tired professionalism in other opera houses one could mention."

The company named Speight Jenkins as its next general director in December 1982, an unusual appointment in that Jenkins did not have prior administrative experience with arts organisations prior to his appointment. Jenkins formally took up the post with the 1983–1984 season, during which the company ran its first-ever fiscal deficit. Early in his tenure, Jenkins stated a goal of producing all ten of the major Wagner works in Seattle. This project began with Tannhäuser in 1984, which was the first Seattle Opera production with supertitles. The project culminated with the August 2003 production of Parsifal, the first company production in its new venue, Marion Oliver McCaw Hall. Jenkins concluded his tenure as general director of Seattle Opera in 2014.

Aidan Lang became general director of the company as of the 2014–2015 season. His tenure included productions of contemporary operas such as As One (Laura Kaminsky) An American Dream (Jack Perla). Lang stood down as general director of the company at the close of the 2018–2019 season.

In March 2019, the company announced the appointment of Christina Scheppelmann as its next general director, the first woman to be named to the post, effective with the 2019–2020 season. Her tenure at Seattle Opera overlapped with the COVID-19 pandemic, and her work at Seattle Opera included presentation of a filmed virtual season of productions. In June 2023, Seattle Opera announced the scheduled conclusion of Scheppelmann's tenure as general director at the close of the 2023–2024 season.

In August 2024, the company announced the appointment of James Robinson as its next general director and artistic director, effective 4 September 2024, with an initial contract of five seasons. His previous work at Seattle Opera included a 2004 production of Carmen that was the largest ticket-seller in the company's history.

Seattle Opera currently does not have a full-time music director. In October 2007, the company announced the appointment of Asher Fisch as its principal guest conductor.

=== Richard Wagner at Seattle Opera ===
For many years, the company was noted for its performances of the works of Richard Wagner, including the Ring cycle. In 1975, it was the first American company to perform the cycle in its entirety over the space of a week since the Metropolitan Opera in 1939. The Seattle Opera's last Ring was in August 2013, and they have stated that they have no plans to produce the Ring in the future.

==== Ring 1, 1975–1984 ====
Beginning with a production of Die Walküre one year, and following successively each year with Siegfried and, finally, Götterdämmerung, Ross announced in 1975 that Das Rheingold would precede the others to make up the first consecutive Ring cycle over six days in July. In spite of the modernization of the opera productions which Ross found at the Bayreuth Festival, Seattle's were to be traditional productions and appeal to the lovers of the traditional.

Two back-to-back cycles of the Ring, one each in German and English, were presented annually between 1975 and 1983. Andrew Porter's English adaptation which was prepared for the English National Opera and which was priced below the German language cycle, introduced many new listeners to Wagner. Originally directed by George London with designer John Naccarato, later presentations were directed by Lincoln Clark between 1976 and 1983, and by the tenor, Ragnar Ulfung in 1984. Henry Holt conducted all the cycles. The performances were well attended and received good press.

By 1982, the cycle was drawing opera lovers from all over the United States, as well as many other countries of the world, and Seattle appeared to be a serious rival to Bayreuth.

==== Ring 2, 1985–1995 ====
Following his appointment as general director, Jenkins immediately set about creating a new Ring production. Die Walküre appeared first, in 1985, followed by complete cycles in 1986, 1987, 1991, and 1995. (Jenkins determined that the company could achieve higher quality performances by presenting the Ring every four years.) The new production was directed by Francois Rochaix, with sets and costumes designed by Robert Israel, lighting designed by Joan Sullivan, and supertitles (the first ever created for the Ring) by Sonya Friedman. The production set the action in a world of nineteenth-century theatricality. Initially controversial, it sold out in 1995. Conductors included Armin Jordan (Die Walküre in 1985), Manuel Rosenthal (1986), and Hermann Michael (1987, 1991, and 1995).

==== Ring 3, 2000–2013 ====
Jenkins engaged a new creative team to conceive Seattle Opera's third Ring production, which was unveiled in 2000 (Das Rheingold and Die Walküre) and 2001 (full cycle) and returned in 2005, 2009, and 2013. Director Stephen Wadsworth, set designer Thomas Lynch, costume designer Martin Pakledinaz, lighting designer Peter Kaczorowski created a production which became known as the "Green" Ring, inspired in part by the natural beauty of the Pacific Northwest. Armin Jordan returned to conduct in 2000, Franz Vote in 2001, and Robert Spano in 2005 and 2009. The 2013 production, conducted by Asher Fisch, was released as a commercial recording on compact disc and on iTunes. The productions starred singers such as Greer Grimsley, Stephanie Blythe, Ewa Podleś, Jane Eaglen, Richard Paul Fink, Margaret Jane Wray, and Stephen Milling.

== Performers ==
Seattle Opera draws some of the world's best opera singers to its stage. Some of the notable performers who have appeared in productions include:

- Harolyn Blackwell – a regular figure on the Seattle Opera stage during the 1990s and 2000s, her credits with the company include the title roles in Donizetti's Lucia di Lammermoor and Delibes's Lakmé.
- Lawrence Brownlee was a participant in Seattle Opera's Young Artist program. Since then, he has appeared with the company as Ernesto in Donizetti's Don Pasquale, Arcadio in Catan's Florencia en el Amazonas, Arturo in Bellini's I puritani, Almaviva in Rossini's Il barbiere di Siviglia, Tonio in Donizetti's La fille du régiment, Don Ottavio in Mozart's Don Giovanni, and Count Ory in Rossini's Count Ory.
- Kevin Burdette debuted with the company in 2006 as Mustafà in Rossini's L'italiana in Algeri.
- Richard Cassilly made his debut with the company as Manrico in April 1967 opposite Eileen Farrell's Leonora and Sherrill Milnes's Count DiLuna.
- Diane Curry – From 1981 until 1986 Curry performed annually in Seattle Opera's Wagner's Der Ring des Nibelungen under director Speight Jenkins, portraying Fricka in Das Rheingold and Die Walküre and Waltraute/Second Norn in Götterdämmerung.
- Geraldine Decker – From 1974 until 1987 Decker performed annually in Seattle Opera's Wagner's Der Ring des Nibelungen under director Speight Jenkins, as Erda in both Das Rheingold and Siegfried, Schwertleite in Die Walküre, and the First Norn Götterdämmerung.
- Jane Eaglen made her American debut as well as her Seattle Opera debut in the company's 1994 production of Bellini's Norma. A previous unknown, she was cast personally by Speight Jenkins to replace Carol Vaness when the latter was unable to sing due to medical issues. She went on to sing Turandot, Isolde, Brünnhilde, Ariadne, Ortrud, Senta, and other roles with the company.
- Joyce El-Khoury sang all the 2016 performances of Maria Stuarda due to a colleague's indisposition.
- Renée Fleming made her debut with the company singing the title role in the 1990 production of Dvořák's Rusalka.
- Nuccia Focile has appeared in many productions, including the title role in the 2007 production of Gluck's Iphigenia in Tauris and Susanna in 2016's Le nozze di Figaro. The company named her "Artist of the Year" for her 2013 performances of La voix humaine.
- Greer Grimsley made his debut as Telramund in Lohengrin in 1994 (revived 2004), then returned for Escamillo (1995), Mephistopheles (1997), Kurwenal (1998 and 2010), Scarpia (2001, 2007, and 2015), Donner and Gunther (2001), Amfortas (2003), Jack Rance (2004), Wotan (2005, 2009, and 2013), the Flying Dutchman (2007 and 2016), and Don Pizarro (2012).
- Andrea Gruber has sung numerous roles with the company including the title role in Verdi's Aida
- Ben Heppner performed his first ever Tristan in Wagner's Tristan und Isolde with Seattle Opera in 1998. Other roles in Seattle include Walther von Stolzing, Lohengrin, and Andrea Chenier.
- Bette Midler played the Acid Queen in Seattle Opera's production of The Who's Tommy, the first time it was ever performed in a theater format.
- Brett Polegato made his debut with the company as Henry Miles in the 2005 production of Jake Heggie's The End of the Affair.
- Alberto Remedios appeared as Siegfried in the Ring with the company in the 1970s.
- Gidon Saks has appeared in several Wagner productions with the company.
- Beverly Sills made her debut with the company in 1965 as Mimi in Puccini's La bohème. It was the only time she ever sang that role on stage.
- Joan Sutherland portrayed Lakmé for the company in 1967, then returned as Donna Anna, the three heroines in Les contes d'Hoffmann, and Sita in Le roi de Lahore.
- Carol Vaness performed frequently with the company in the 1980s and 1990s.

== Conductors and directors ==
George Fiore was Seattle Opera's choral director from 1983 through 2000.

Seattle Opera often invites guest directors and conductors to take part in its productions. Notable conductors and directors include:

- Christopher Alden made his debut with the company in 1990 directing Mozart's Don Giovanni.
- Asher Fisch made his debut opening McCaw Hall with Parsifal, and returned to conduct Lohengrin, Der fliegende Holländer, Tristan und Isolde, Fidelio, and Der Ring des Nibelungen (released as a commercial CD recording). He won "Artist of the Year" for conducting both Der Rosenkavalier (2006) and Turandot (2012).
- Richard Pearlman conducted the first professional theatrical production of The Who's rock opera Tommy featuring Bette Midler with the company in 1971.
- Bartlett Sher made his opera directing debut with the company's production of Marvin David Levy's Mourning Becomes Electra.
- Robert Spano conducted the 2005 and 2009 productions of The Ring Cycle.
- Werner Torkanowsky conducted the 1974 production of Boito's Mefistofele.
- Stephen Wadsworth directed the Ring Cycle in 2005, 2009 and 2013. In 2007 he directed the first ever co production of Seattle Opera with the Metropolitan Opera, Iphigénie en Tauride.
- Tomer Zvulun started as an assistant director in the 2005–06 and 2006–07 seasons. He then returned as an associate director for the Ring cycle in 2009 and directed new productions of Lucia di Lammermoor in 2010, La bohème in 2013 and Semele in 2015.

== New operas ==
Seattle Opera supports the creation of new operas and has commissioned several works throughout its history. New operas performed by the company include:

- Carlisle Floyd's Of Mice and Men (1970)
- Thomas Pasatieri's Calvary (1971)
- Thomas Pasatieri's Black Widow (1972)
- Daniel Catán's Florencia en el Amazonas (1998)
- Marvin David Levy's Mourning Becomes Electra (2003, premiere of revised version)
- Daron Hagen's Amelia (2010)
- Sheila Silver's A Thousand Splendid Suns (2023)

== See also ==
- Pacific MusicWorks
