= Opera Vista =

Opera Vista was a nonprofit chamber opera company in Houston, Texas, founded in 2006 by conductor and artistic director Viswa Subbaraman, soprano Elizabeth Knudson and her husband musician Chris Knudson. The company aimed to promote and perform new and contemporary works, and to attract new and younger audiences who may be unaccustomed to opera.

Subbaraman stated that the idea for the company grew out of a desire to see people his own age attending opera: "It started with a bunch of friends at a bar, talking about the fact that our peers didn't go to opera or classical music. We started to talk about ways to make that happen - and out of that came Opera Vista."

In addition to performing lesser-known and lesser-performed works, the company presented many premieres of new and contemporary works, including the World Premieres of James D. Norman’s Wake…, R. Timothy Brady's Edelat Square, Line Tjornhoj’s Anorexia Sacra, and Somtow Sucharitkul's The Silent Prince.

Opera Vista also held an annual competition for composers of contemporary chamber opera.
