= Christina Scheppelmann =

German arts administrator

- Born: Germany
- Occupation: General director of the Seattle Opera

Christina Scheppelmann (born 1965) is a German arts administrator. Scheppelmann is the general director-designate and artistic director-designate of La Monnaie.

== Biography ==
Scheppelmann earned her degree in banking in Germany. In 1988, she began working in artist management in Milan, Italy. In 1994, she worked for the San Francisco Opera, overseeing the season design and staffing. Scheppelmann was director of artistic operations at the Washington National Opera for 11 years.

From December 2012 to January 2015, Scheppelmann was the first general director of the Royal Opera House Muscat. Scheppelmann subsequently served as artistic director of the Gran Teatre del Liceu in Barcelona, Spain.

In March 2019, Seattle Opera announced the appointment of Scheppelmann as its next general director, the first woman to be named to the post, effective with the 2019-2020 season. Her tenure at Seattle Opera overlapped with the COVID-19 pandemic, and her work at Seattle Opera included presentation of a filmed virtual season of productions. In June 2023, Seattle Opera announced that Scheppelmann is to stand down as its general director at the close of the 2023-2024 season. In parallel, La Monnaie announced the appointment of Scheppelmann as its next general director and artistic director, effective 1 July 2025, with an initial contract of six years. The starting time of her tenure at La Monnaie has since been revised to January 2025.

In private life, Scheppelmann and her spouse Beth were married by US Supreme Court Associate Justice Ruth Bader Ginsburg.

Cultural offices
Preceded by Aidan Lang	General Director, Seattle Opera; 2019–2024	Succeeded by James Robinson
