= Ueda Masashi (musician) =

Japanese conductor (1904–1966)

- 上田仁
- Born: Ōno, Hokkaido
- Died: December 25, 1966 (aged 62)
- Education: Oriental School of Music

Ueda Masashi (上田仁) (December 4, 1904 – December 26, 1966) was a Japanese conductor, pianist, and bassoonist.

== Biography ==
Ueda was born in 1904 in the village of Ōno (present-day Hokuto), Hokkaido. His father, Haruna, was a doctor. In 1917, Ueda graduates from the Ōno Elementary School. In 1922, Ueda graduated from the piano department of the Oriental School of Music in Tokyo. Three years later he joined Yamada Kōsaku's Japan Symphony Society Orchestra, one of the precursor ensembles to the modern NHK Symphony Orchestra, as a bassoonist. Upon that orchestra's collapse, he joined the New Symphony Orchestra that was organized by Yamada's former orchestral partner, Konoye Hidemaro. Ueda remained with the orchestra until 1943, supplementing his income by recording accompaniments for Nippon Columbia, including with Suwa Nejiko, and playing on soundtracks for Toho films.

He later studied conducting with Joseph Rosenstock. After the Pacific War, Ueda assumed the music directorship of the newly established Tōhō Symphony Orchestra. His debut concert as their conductor took place at Hibiya Public Hall on May 15, 1946. While at the helm of the orchestra, Ueda introduced many contemporary works to Japan, especially from the Soviet Union, including Dmitri Shostakovich's Symphony No. 12 "The Year 1917". He also led the Japanese premieres of Shostakovich’s Symphony No. 9 and Song of the Forests. Anastas Mikoyan awarded Ueda the Presidium of the Supreme Soviet of the RSFSR's Certificate of Honor in 1958 for his services to Soviet music.

Ueda died while giving a piano lesson in Osaka on December 26, 1966.
