= Evgeny Mogilevsky =

Russian pianist (1945–2023)

Evgeny Gedeonovich Mogilevsky (Russian: Евгений Гедеонович Могилевский; 16 September 1945 – 28 January 2023) was a pianist. He was the son and pupil of Seraphima Mogilevsky at the Stolyarsky Music school in his hometown Odesa, Ukraine. He later studied with Heinrich Neuhaus and Yakov Zak at the Moscow Conservatory. He was the father of pianists Maxim and Alexander Mogilevsky.

In 1964 at the age of 18, he became the third Soviet pianist to win the Queen Elisabeth Competition, after Emil Gilels and Vladimir Ashkenazy. He has had a significant career, including internationally (in the USA as a Sol Hurok artist). In the latter half of the 1970s, he performed throughout the world as a soloist with the USSR State Symphony Orchestra under Yevgeny Svetlanov. His recording of Rachmaninoff's 3rd Piano Concerto (Kirill Kondrashin conducting) won several prizes.

In 1992 began teaching at the Brussels Conservatory.

Alexander Mogilevsky, violinist, was the brother of his grandfather.
