= Roland C. Jordan =

American composer and music theorist

Roland Carroll Jordan, Jr (born 1938) is an American composer and music theorist. He studied in Texas and Pennsylvania before receiving his Ph.D. from Washington University in St. Louis, where he taught theory and composition for three decades. As a composer, Jordan has written for both large ensembles and chamber groups, and as a music theorist, he has explored the uses of phenomenological methodology and structuralist/post-structuralist theory.

== List of works ==
- Times Space (encounters) for chorus and tape
- Maps, An Evening of Music (produced by the New Music Circle and Washington University, 1978)
- Sonata for Piano (commissioned by the NMC and written for John Phillips)
- Songs for Li Po (commissioned by River Stix)
- Except Perhaps a Constellation concerto, for flute and chamber orchestra
- Sonata for Violin and Viola and Years of the Plague, for chamber ensemble and pre-recorded tape (written for Synchronia)

== List of publications ==
- with Emma Kafalenos. "The Double Trajectory: Ambiguity in Brahms and Henry James." 19th-Century Music 13 (2) (Fall, 1989): 129-144.
- with Emma Kafalenos. "Spatial Aspects of Temporal Structure: The Effects of Ordering and Reordering in Mozart and E. T. A. Hoffmann." In Proceedings of the XIIth Congress of the International Comparative Literature Association, Munich 1988, IV: Space and Boundaries of Literature, 530-35. Munich: Iudicium, 1990.
- "Fold upon Fold: Boulez (and Mallarme)." Yearbook of Comparative and General Literature 1987-88-97.
