= Viswa Subbaraman =

American conductor

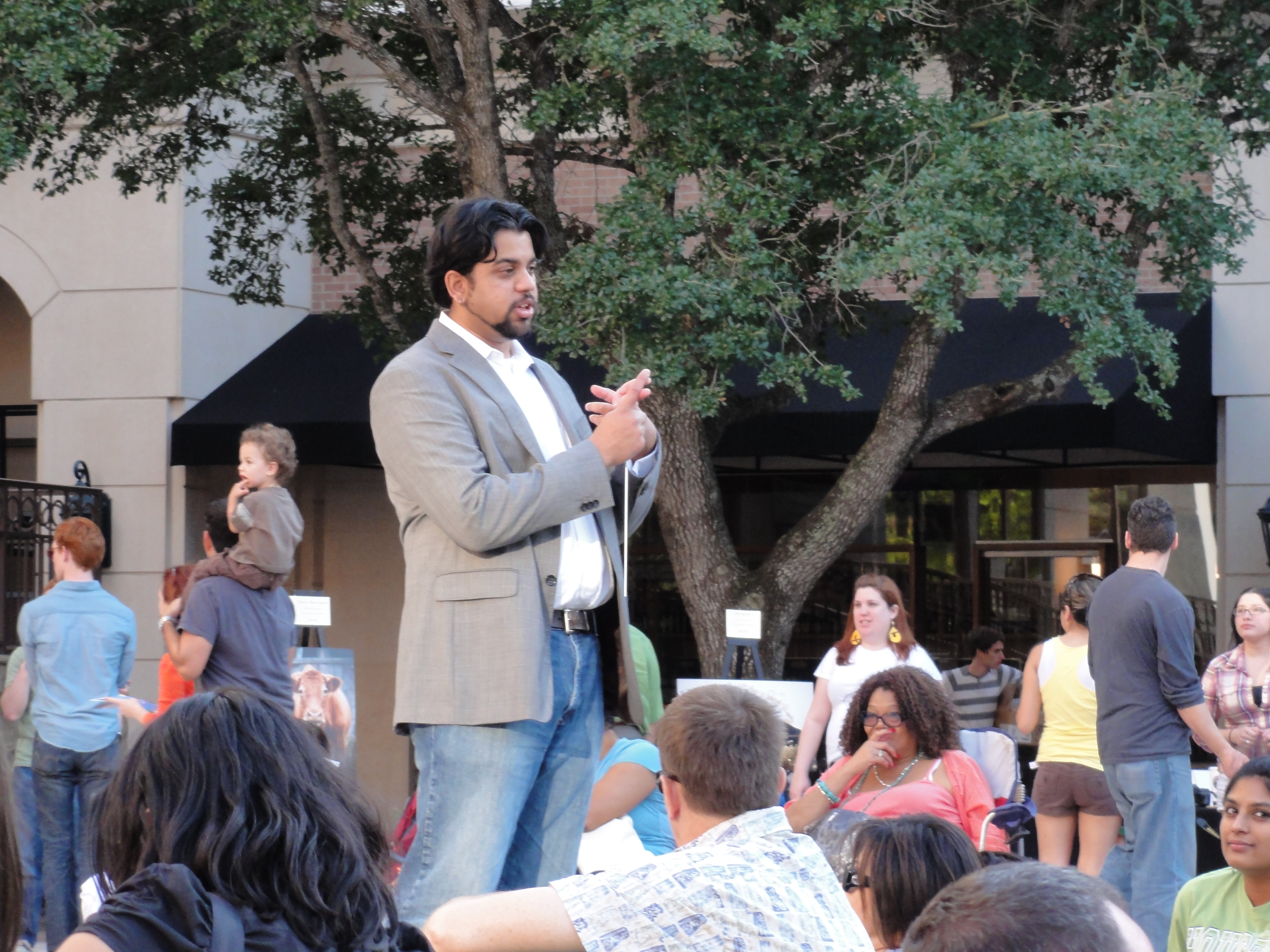
- Viswa Subbaraman leading an Opera 101 event for Opera Vista at Sugar Land Town Square, Sugar Land, Texas, October 2, 2010
- Born: December 1, 1976; Big Spring, Texas, United States
- Education: Duke University
- Occupation: Conductor
- Years active: 2004 – present
- Organizations: Opera Vista; Skylight Music Theatre
- Style: Classical music
- Website: www.viswasubbaraman.com

Viswa Subbaraman (born December 1, 1976) is an American conductor. Subbaraman was co-founder and artistic director of Opera Vista, and served as artistic director of Skylight Music Theatre. He served as music director and conductor for two productions at the Gilbert and Sullivan Society of Houston.

== Early life and education ==
Subbaraman was born in Big Spring, Texas, on December 1, 1976, to Shantha Subbaraman, a homemaker and Dr Subbaraman, a general surgeon in Midland, TX. After graduating from Big Spring High School, he attended Duke University, where he earned degrees in music and biology. Subbaraman intended to follow a pre-med path until a trip to Vienna while a college freshman inspired him to pursue music. He then worked as assistant to William Henry Curry, resident conductor of the North Carolina Symphony. Upon completion of his master's degree from Texas Tech University, he was awarded a Fulbright Program grant to study conducting with John Nelson in Paris.

Further conducting study included the Kurt Masur Conducting Seminar at the Manhattan School of Music, the Institut Musical de Provence-Aubagne in France, Accademia Chigiana in Italy, and the Brevard Music Center. Subbaraman was also a semifinalist in the Suwon International Conductors Competition in Suwon, Korea, the Vakhtang Jordania Competition, and The Grzegorz Fitelberg International Competition for Conductors. He has studied with many prominent conductors including Leonard Slatkin, Marin Alsop, David Effron, and Gunther Schuller.

He has an MBA through the McCombs School of Business at the University of Texas at Austin.

== Career ==
In Paris, he worked as the visiting assistant conductor of the Ensemble Orchestra of Paris. Two months after arriving, Subbaraman was offered a post by Kurt Masur with the Orchestre National de France. At the end of his Fulbright year, Subbaraman received a year extension, the first extension ever issued by the French Fulbright Commission.

=== Opera Vista ===
In 2006 Subbaraman relocated to Houston, where he – along with Chris and Elizabeth Knudsen – founded Opera Vista, which quickly united with the also newly-formed Houston Opera Theatre. Performance highlights during his tenure with Opera Vista include the world premiere of James Norman's Wake..., the world premiere of Line Tjørnhøj’s Anorexia Sacra (marking his stage directing debut), the Texas premiere and historic New Orleans premiere of Amy Beach's Cabildo, the world premiere of Somtow Sucharitkul’s The Silent Prince, and the creation of the annual Vista Competition for New Opera.

=== Skylight Music Theatre ===
On September 5, 2012, Skylight Music Theatre named Subbaraman their new artistic director beginning with the 2013–14 season. During his three-year tenure, he expanded the renown of the Skylight's reputation, conducting the world premiere of Somtow Sucharitkul’s The Snow Dragon and serving as both musical and stage director for Ludwig van Beethoven's Fidelio in a Bollywood setting, starring Cassandra Black in the lead role.

=== We Shall Not Be Moved ===
In 2017 Subbaraman, increasingly recognized as a leading conductor of new works, was tapped to be the music director for Opera Philadelphia's world premiere production of We Shall Not Be Moved, a collaboration between composer Daniel Bernard Roumain and poet/spoken word artist Marc Bamuthi Joseph, with stage direction and choreography by Bill T. Jones. Subbaraman subsequently led the show at the Apollo Theater in New York City and at the Dutch National Opera in Amsterdam.

=== The Gilbert & Sullivan Society of Houston ===
In 2017, the Gilbert & Sullivan Society of Houston, Houston's oldest opera company, hired Subbaraman to be the music director for their post-Hurricane Harvey production, "A Treasure Trove of Gilbert & Sullivan". He returned to lead their production of "A Topsy Turvy Mikado", a new production conceived by Houston G&S's stage director and former D'Oyly Carte Opera Company star Alistair Donkin, at the Hobby Center for the Performing Arts in Houston in July 2019.

=== South Asian Symphony Orchestra ===
With the aim to promote greater cultural integration for the cause of peace in South Asia, the South Asian Symphony Foundation tapped Subbaraman in 2018 to be the conductor for the inaugural performance of the South Asian Symphony Orchestra, pulling together over seventy musicians from a half-dozen countries and diaspora. The concert, entitled "Chiragh: A Concert Beyond Borders", was performed in Mumbai on April 26, 2019.

=== Guest appearances ===
Subbaraman served as Assistant Conductor of the Orchestre National de France where he assisted Kurt Masur and visiting guest conductors, including Bernard Haitink, Riccardo Muti, and Colin Davis. Highlights of his tenure with the Orchestre National de France include the world premiere of the Overture du Roi Lear by Paul Dukas, a performance of the Stravinsky Octet with soloists of the orchestra in the Théâtre des Champs-Élysées and the French premiere of the Symphony for Trombone and Orchestra by Ernst Bloch, which has been recorded and released under the title Tranquille through the districlassic label. Subbaraman has conducted the National Symphony Orchestra in Washington, D.C., at the Kennedy Center as a Debut Conductor in the National Conducting Institute. Additional conducting appearances have included the Orchestre National d’Ile de France, Colorado Springs Philharmonic, Thames Philharmonia, the Bombay Chamber Orchestra, Orchestre symphonique et lyrique de Nancy, the New Amsterdam Symphony Orchestra, Longview Symphony Orchestra, the Midland/Odessa Symphony and Chorale, the Orchestre National du Capitole Toulouse, the AudioInversions Contemporary Music Ensemble, the Williamsport Symphony Orchestra, and the Cabrillo Festival Orchestra.

== Awards and honors ==
Subbaraman was selected by the Houston Press as a "100 Creatives 2012", one of the one hundred most creative people in Houston. Opera Vista and Subbaraman were also honored with the 2010 Mastermind Award from the Houston Press for artistic creativity and innovative outreach.

In 2005, Subbaraman was awarded the Herbert von Karajan Conducting Fellowship by the Herbert von Karajan Center (now the Eliette and Herbert von Karajan Institute) and American Austrian Foundation which resulted in his residency at the Salzburg Festival. He also took part in the 2006 Beethoven Seminar sponsored by the Beethoven Orchester Bonn and the Beethoven House. Normally a seminar open only to German conductors, Subbaraman was invited by Masur to take part in lectures given by Beethoven House scholars and was also invited to conduct the Beethoven Orchester Bonn on the final concert.

He is also a recipient of the Edward C. Lynch Fellowship.

Subbaraman was selected as a delegate to the 2010 Asia21 Young Leader's Summit in Jakarta by the Asia Society. He was one of 100 Indians from around the world invited to take part in the inaugural Indiaspora Summit.

== Publications ==
Subbaraman gave a talk at TEDxHouston in 2012.
