= Denis Comtet =

French conductor

- Born: 30 April 1970 (age 55); Versailles, France
- Education: Conservatoire de Paris
- Occupations: Classical organist; Choral conductor; Director
- Organizations: Orchestre philharmonique de Radio France

Denis Comtet (born 30 April 1970) is a French organist, pianist, choral conductor, and conductor.

== Biography ==
=== Training ===
Born in Versailles, Denis Comtet studied organ with Gaston Litaize at the Saint-Maur-des-Fossés conservatory. He then studied at the Conservatoire de Paris where he later obtained two first prizes: in organ (in Michel Chapuis' class) and piano accompaniment (in Jean Koerner's class, where he discovered the contemporary repertoire). He then trained as conductor in Italy with Bruno Aprea.

== Career ==
=== Organist ===
As an organist, he has performed in concert on the principal instruments of our time: Notre-Dame in Paris, the auditorium Maurice Ravel de Lyon, the Chartres Cathedral, Saint-Eustache, the auditorium de Radio France (new instrument by Gerhard Grenzing), the Saint-Paul Church of London, the St. Patrick's Cathedral (Manhattan) of New-York. He is regularly invited to play with the musical bands of Radio France: Maîtrise de Radio France, Choir and Orchestre philharmonique de Radio France, and Orchestre national de France. He played the Symphonie n° 3 by Saint-Saëns at the salle Pleyel in Paris, the Konzerthaus, Vienna, the Royal Festival Hall of London, the Suntory Hall of Tokyo, the Carnegie Hall of New-York. He is titular of the grand organ of Saint-François-Xavier, Paris.

=== Choral conductor ===
He became associate chief of the Accentus (choir) between 2003 and 2007, which he directed at the Cité de la musique, the Besançon International Music Festival, as well as the Ircam. He also founded, under the impulse of Emmanuelle Haïm, the choir of Le Concert d'Astrée. He was subsequently invited by the Chœur de chambre de Namur, the State choir of Latvia, the Chœur de Radio France, the Stuttgart Radio Choir (SWR Vocal Ensemble) during the Donaueschingen Festival, and the Schwetzingen Festival, the Cologne Radio Choir (Westdeutscher Rundfunk), the Leipzig Radio Choir (Mitteldeutscher Rundfunk), as well as the Berlin Radio Choir. In 2013 he began a collaboration with the RIAS Kammerchor which he prepared for productions with orchestra (Berlin Philharmonic) or else for premieres (Disputatio by Pascal Dusapin in 2015).

=== Conductor ===
In 2002, he was appointed assistant conductor of the Ensemble Intercontemporain, where he collaborated with Pierre Boulez, Péter Eötvös, Jonathan Nott, Heinz Holliger. He subsequently directed the Rouen Philharmonic Orchestra, the Orchestre national de Lille, the Dartington International Summer School orchestra, Le Concert d'Astrée, the Dijon-Bourgogne orchestra, the Latvian National Orchestra, the Southwest German Radio Symphony Orchestra, the Philharmoniker-Staatsorchestrer of the Staatskapelle Halle during the Göttingen International Handel Festival.

At the theatre he directed the Great Mass in C minor, K. 427 by Mozart (Théâtre des Champs-Elysées of Paris), the Lamentations by Helmut Lachenmann (Cité de la Musique of Paris), Der Mond by Carl Orff (Amphitheatrer of the Opéra Bastille), The Cunning Little Vixen by Leoš Janáček (Lille Opéra), Peter and the Wolf by Serge Prokofiev (Rouen Opéra, Besançon), the Nouvelles Aventures by György Ligeti (Capitole de Toulouse, Grand Théâtre de Bordeaux), l'Opéra de Lune by Brice Pauset (Opéra de Dijon). He has also been the director of the Ars Terra International Chamber Music Festival since 2011.

== Recordings ==
- André Fleury: Fantaisie, Triptyque, Prélude, Andante et Toccata, Carillon sur Victimae paschali laudes, Symphonie pour Orgue n°2 (Eglise Saint-François Xavier de Paris in 1999)
- Francis Poulenc: Litanies à la Vierge noire with the Accentus (choir), direction Laurence Equilbey (Prix Nouvelle Académie du disque 1998) - Universal Music ASI B000026A2J
- Jehan Alain: Prière pour nous autres charnels with the Chœur de l'Armée française (Prize of the Académie Charles-Cros) - Corélia CC895766
- Gaston Litaize: Triptyque pour Deux Orgues (Eglise Notre-Dame de Paris with Olivier Latry in 2002) - ASIN B00004VF3C
- Le Livre de Notre-Dame: 12 motets avec la Maîtrise Notre-Dame de Paris
