= Ben Glassberg =

British conductor (born 1994)

- Born: 1994 (age 31–32); London, United Kingdom
- Occupation: Conductor
- Website: www.benglassberg.co.uk

Benjamin Matthew Glassberg-Frost (born 1994, London) is a British conductor.

== Biography ==
Glassberg is from North London and attended Mill Hill School. After completing a music degree at the University of Cambridge, he studied conducting with Sian Edwards at the Royal Academy of Music. In 2017, aged 23, he won the Grand Prix at the 55th International Besançon Competition for Young Conductors.

Glassberg has served as associate guest conductor of the Orchestre National de Lyon. He was principal conductor of Glyndebourne on Tour from 2019 to 2021.

With the 2020–2021 season, Glassberg became music director of the Opéra de Rouen Normandie. He became principal guest conductor of the Vienna Volksoper as of the 2022–2023 season, and held this title through 31 December 2023. In September 2023, the Vienna Volksoper announced the appointment of Glassberg as its next music director, effective 1 January 2024. In June 2025 the mutually agreed rescission of the contract, relating to Glassberg’s ongoing challenges with depression, with immediate effect was announced without mentioning a successor.

== Discography ==
- Tempéraments, with piano soloist Shani Diluka and Orchestre de chambre de Paris (Mirare, 2019)
- Aranjuez, with Guitar soloist Thibaut Garcia and Orchestre national du Capitole de Toulouse (Erato / Warner Classics, 2020)
- Séguedilles, with Mezzo-Soprano Marianne Crebassa and the Orchestre national du Capitole de Toulouse (Erato, 2021)
- Britten: The Turn of the Screw, with La Monnaie Chamber Orchestra (Alpha Classics, 2022)
- Les Eaux célestes, anthology of works by composer Camille Pépin, performed with Orchestre National de Lyon (NoMadMusic, 2023)

Cultural offices
| Preceded by Jakub Hrůša | Principal Conductor, Glyndebourne on Tour; 2019–2021 | Succeeded by Adam Hickox |
| Preceded by Leo Hussain | Music Director, Opéra de Rouen Normandie; 2020–present | Succeeded by incumbent |
| Preceded by Omer Meir Wellber | Music Director, Vienna Volksoper; 2024–2025 | Succeeded by vacant |
