= Bertrand Bontoux =

French operatic bass

Bertrand Bontoux (born 1967) is a French operatic bass.

== Training and prizes ==
After twelve years of piano studies, he turned to a singing career, first under the direction of Claude Calès at the École normale de musique de Paris, where he obtained two diplomas in opera and concert music, then at the Conservatoire de Paris, under the direction of Peter Gottlieb. In 1992, he won First Prize in the International Competition of the "Maîtres du chant français", as well as the "Darius Milhaud" prize. In 1994, he received the "Gounod" and "Duparc" prizes in the Triptych competition.

== Roles and premieres ==
Bontoux made his debut at the Opéra Garnier in Rameau's Hippolyte et Aricie, in which he interpreted the Third Fate, under the baton of William Christie. He was a soloist in the Requiems by Liszt (recorded in 1989 under the direction of Yves Parmentier), Verdi, Fauré, Mozart (Bertrand de Billy conducting), and Cimarosa (recorded in 1995); Bach's Christ lag in Todesbanden and St John Passion; Haydn's The Seven Last Words of Christ (Valérie Fayet conducting); Mozart's Great Mass in C minor, K. 427, Vesperae solennes de confessore, and Coronation Mass; Rossini's Stabat Mater; Dvořák's Te Deum and Mass in D major; Beethoven's Choral Fantasy and Symphony No. 9; Puccini's Messa di Gloria; Handel's Messiah and Mendelssohn's Psalm 42.

On stage, he played Arkel in Debussy's Pelléas et Mélisande at the 1990 Loches festival, a role he performed and recorded at the Théâtre impérial de Compiègne in 1999, 2000 and 2002, before performing it in London in 2003. In 1991, he was Sarastro in Mozart's The Magic Flute, Jean-Pierre Loret conducting. He also performed Bartolo in The Marriage of Figaro; the tree and the armchair in Ravel's L'enfant et les sortilèges (under the baton of Manuel Rosenthal); the step-father in Milhaud's Le pauvre matelot (under the direction of Jean-Sébastien Bereau); Banquo in Verdi's Macbeth (under the baton of Claude Schnitzler at the Saint-Céré festival in 1992).

At the Opéra de Massy, he played Frère Laurent in Gounod's Roméo et Juliette, in a staging by Albert-André Lheureux, then Monterone in Verdi's Rigoletto.

In 2002, he also sang the role of Antinoo in Monteverdi's Il ritorno d'Ulisse in patria under the direction of W. Christie. Staged in 2000, as part of the Aix-en-Provence Festival, by Adrian Noble, this opera was the subject of a major tour from February to June 2002 (Paris, Lausanne, New York, London, and Vienna).

He is also a soloist of the Accentus chamber choir (under the direction of Laurence Equilbey), and has given numerous recitals. He has premiered pieces by Denis Dufour and Florence Baschet. With Jean-Loup Pagésy and Claude Massoz, he is part of the "Trio des Trois Basses".

With the organist Bertrand Ferrier, he performs duets, organ-voice or piano-voice, sometimes classical, sometimes comic. In June 2006, they gave a series of recitals at the Theatre of the Tambour royal in Paris.

His recordings include Charpentier's Te Deum, under the direction of William Christie and, under the direction of Olivier Opdebeeck, Legrenzi's Vespers, as well as Alexandre Guilmant's mass, with the Cori Spezzati Ensemble.
