= Accentus (choir) =

- Choir
- Origin: France
- Founded: 1991
- Founder: Laurence Equilbey
- Genre: Chamber music
- Chief conductor: Laurence Equilbey
- Headquarters: Rouen, France
- Rehearsal space: Opéra de Rouen
- Concert hall: Corneille's Chapel, Théâtre des Arts

Accentus is a French chamber choir founded by Laurence Equilbey in 1991. The ensemble has been in residence at the Opéra de Rouen since 1998. When in Rouen, the choir usually holds concerts at the Théâtre des Arts or the recently reopened Chapelle Corneille.

== History ==
Founded in 1991, the ensemble received the support of the Fondation France Telecom in 1993. Performing mostly contemporary compositions, the choir has collaborated with conductor Eric Ericson since 1996, and has been in résidence at the Rouen Opera House since 1998. Following the world success of Pascal Dusapin's creations Granum sinapis (1998) and Dona eis (1998) and the French creation Outis (1999) by Luciano Berio, Accentus went on a world tour accompanied by the Ensemble InterContemporain founded by Pierre Boulez, which took them to different countries including the United States.

== Repertoire ==
Founded by Laurence Equilbey, the choir is made up of 32 singers, all professionals. The scope of the ensemble ranges from the 17th century compositions to contemporary creations.

The choir also accompanies large symphonic orchestras, under the direction of Pierre Boulez, Jonathan Nott and Christoph Eschenbach, as well as the Orchestre de Paris, the Ensemble InterContemporain and the Rouen Philharmonic Orchestra. The ensemble also takes part in lyrical concerts.

== Discography ==
- 1994 : Poulenc, Ravel - Chœurs profanes / Secular Choral Works
- 1997 : Poulenc
- 1998 : Mendelssohn - Psalms & Motets - Hora Est
- 1998 : Schubert
- 2000 : Antigona (Decca)
- 2000 : North
- 2000 : Pascal Dusapin - Requiem(s)
- 2001 : Brahms - Schumann - Chœurs profanes
- 2001 : Poulenc - Figure humaine
- 2002 : Suomi
- 2003 : Transcriptions
- 2004 : Brahms - Ein Deutsches Requiem
- 2005 : Mozart - Mass
- 2005 : Schoenberg
- 2006 : Brahms - Schumann - A Capella choruses
- 2006 : Haydn - Seven Last Words
- 2006 : Transcriptions 2
- 2006 : Un soir de neige
- 2007 : Liszt - Via crucis
- 2008 : Dvorak - Stabat Mater
- 2008 : Faure - Requiem
- 2009 : Strauss - A cappella
- 2010 : Nuit sacrée: 1. Canon in D major – Johann Pachelbel; 2. Choral ‘Jesus bleibet meine Freude’ - J. S. Bach; 3. Jauchzet, frohlocket! – J. S. Bach; 4. Ave Maria – Charles Gounod / J. S. Bach; 5. Alleluia – Dietrich Buxtehude; 6. For unto us a child is born (Messiah) – G. F. Handel; 7. Alleluia (Messiah) – G. F. Handel; 8. Benedictus (Oratorio de Noël) – Camille Saint-Saëns; 9. Panis Angelicus, César Franck; 10. Alleluia (Exsultate, jubilate) – W. A. Mozart; 11. Farandole (L’Arlésienne) – Georges Bizet; 12. Minuit, chrétiens! – Adolphe Adam; 13. Trois anges sont venus ce soir – Agusta Holmès; 14. Stille Nacht! Heilige Nacht! – F. X Gruber.
- 2010 : Rachmaninoff - Liturgie de saint Jean Chryostome - Vêpres
- 2011 : Mendelssohn - Christus
- 2011 : Philippe Manoury - Inharmonies
- 2013 : Brahms - Ein Deutsches Requiem (Réédition)
- 2013 : Janacek - Brumes d'enfance
- 2014 : Mozart - Requiem
- 2015 : Félicien David - Le Désert

== Musicians ==
The group has worked with musicians such as vocalist Sandrine Piau, Bertrand Bontoux, and vocalist Kaoli Isshiki. It has also collaborated with conductors Georgia Spiropoulos and Denis Comtet.

== Awards and nominations ==
- Grammy Award for Best Choral Performance (nominated 2004, 2006)

== See also ==
- Le postillon de Lonjumeau
- Festival des Nuits Romantiques
- Guillaume Cerutti - former board member
- La Seine Musicale
