= La Seine Musicale =

Culture and leisure centre in Boulogne-Billancourt, France

- Interactive map of the La Seine Musicale area

General information
- Type: Culture and leisure
- Architectural style: High-tech
- Location: Île Seguin, Boulogne-Billancourt, France
- Coordinates: 48°49′25.61″N 2°13′59.67″E
- Opened: April 22, 2017

Technical details
- Structural system: Steel superstructure with reinforced concrete floors

Design and construction
- Architects: Shigeru Ban and Jean de Gastines

Other information
- Seating capacity: 1,150 (Patrick-Devedjian Auditorium); 4,000–6,000 (Grande Seine)

La Seine Musicale (French pronunciation: [la sɛn myzikal]; lit. 'The Musical Seine') is a music and performing arts center located on Île Seguin an island on the Seine river between Boulogne-Billancourt and Sèvres, in the western suburbs of Paris, France.

== Events ==
La Seine Musicale was inaugurated on 22 April 2017 with a concert by Insula orchestra, accompanied by the Accentus choir, conducted by Laurence Equilbey at the Patrick Devedjian Auditorium. During inauguration week a day earlier, American folk rock singer Bob Dylan was the first recording artist to hold a concert at the venue, for which he chose to perform at the 6,000-seat Grand Seine. On 8 December 2018, the venue hosted the final draw of the 2019 FIFA Women's World Cup.

On 19 December 2021 the Junior Eurovision Song Contest 2021 was hosted on the Grande Seine, the biggest venue in the complex. It was the first time that France has hosted the contest, as well as the first Eurovision event to be hosted in the country since Eurovision Young Dancers 1999 in Lyon.

== Construction and facilities ==
The auditorium and its solar sail

In July 2009, the lead coordinating architect for the project was named as Jean Nouvel; although individual buildings have subsequently been commissioned from a range of international architectural practices. The initial complex of buildings on the island opened in April 2017 and were designed by the architectural team of Shigeru Ban and Jean de Gastines.

The facilities include an elevated egg-shaped theater-in-the-round mostly for classical music, a larger concert hall that hosts pop stars, rehearsal rooms for musicians (Riffx Studios), seminar rooms, a press center, restaurants and an extensive roof garden. Much of the site's daytime energy needs are supplied by a large mobile curved solar panel array that covers the smaller auditorium. From the fourth floor, there is an all-round view of the surroundings.

Seating capacity for the unamplified Patrick-Devedjian Auditorium is 1,150. The larger modular concert hall, Grande Seine, at a lower elevation on the island site, is able to accommodate audiences of up to 6,000.
