= Gangloff =

Gangloff may refer to:

== People ==
- François Gangloff, a French gymnast and Olympic medalist
- Françoise Levechin-Gangloff, a French classical organist
- Gangulphus, an 8th-century French saint also known at St. Gangloff
- Hope Gangloff, an American painter
- Mark Gangloff, an American competition swimmer and Olympic medalist
- Steven Gangloff, MD, an American physician and cookbook author.

== Places ==
- Gangloff (Becherbach), a village in the municipality of Becherbach in Rhineland-Palatinate, Germany
- Sankt Gangloff, a municipality in Thuringia, Germany

== Other uses ==
- Gangloff AG, a Swiss-French builder of bodies for cable cars and other vehicles, bought by Calag in 2018
