= René Saorgin =

French organist (1928–2015)

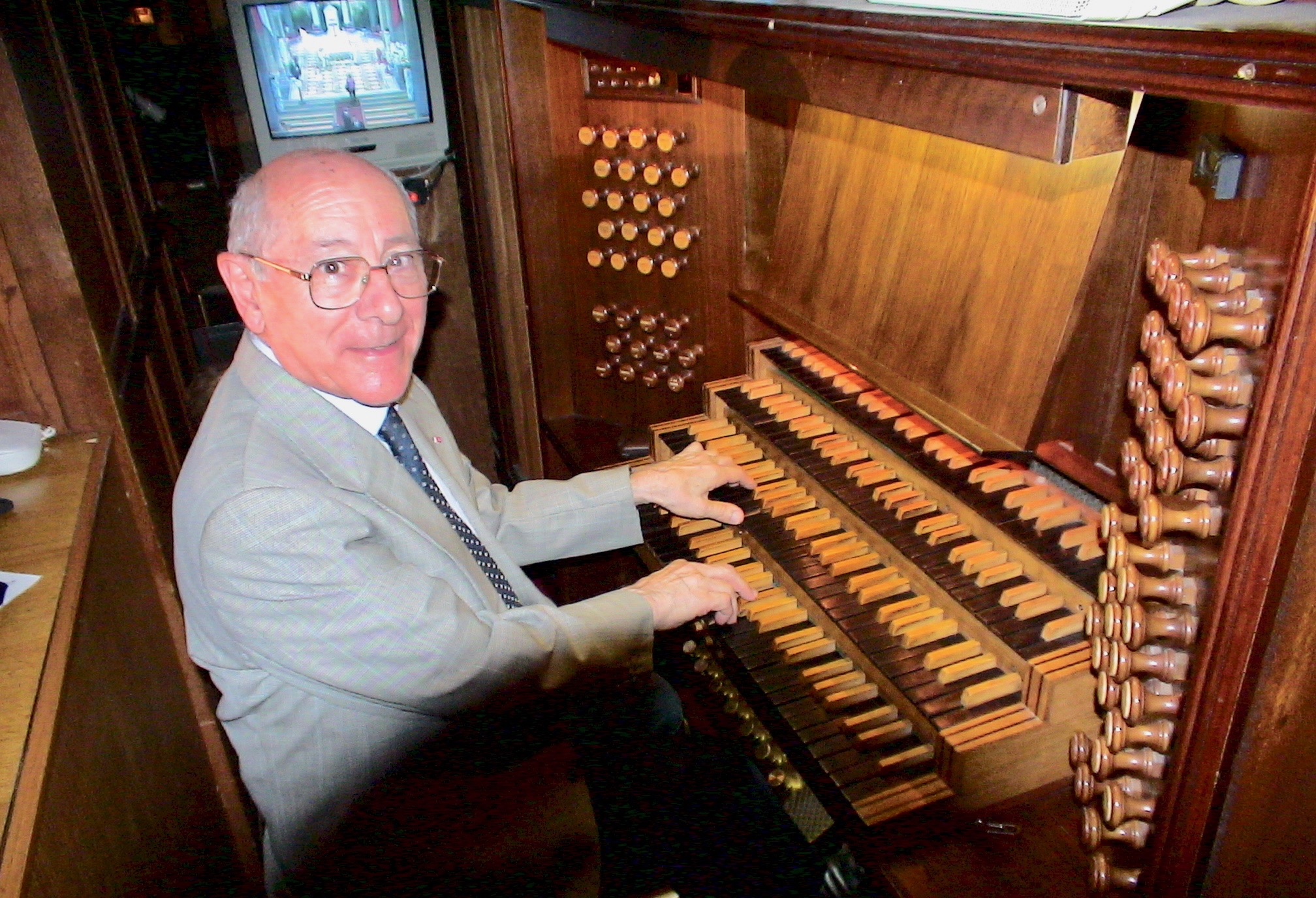
Saorgin at the console of the great organ of Monaco Cathedral (2005)

René Joseph Antoine Saorgin (31 October 1928 – 16 December 2015) was a French organist.

== Biography ==
Saorgin was born in Cannes and began his musical studies at the Nice Conservatoire and then went to Paris to study composition with Maurice Duruflé and Noël Gallon at the Paris Conservatoire. At the same time he took organ lessons with Gaston Litaize.

Benefitting from the revival of the classical organ between 1955 and 1960, his knowledge and mastery of the instrument were essentially self-taught. His first appointment was as organist of the Church of Saint-Pierre de Montmartre in Paris.

From 1954 to 1996 he was professor of organ at the National Regional Conservatoire in Nice; from 1954 to 1984 Titulaire of the main organ of the Church of Saint-Jean-Baptiste, Nice; from 1984 to 2005 titulaire of the main organ of the Cathedral of the Principality of Monaco. He was director of the Ajaccio Conservatoire for three years. In 1962, with Pierre Rochas, he cofounded the Académie de St. Maximin. He was the president and founder (and co-founder) of numerous organ associations, and a member of the high commission for historical monuments.

Saorgin died in Nice on 16 December 2015, aged 87.

== Recordings ==
René Saorgin made recordings of the complete organ works of Buxtehude on historical organs, and Bach's Orgelbüchlein. He recorded the music of Frescobaldi on the Antegnati organ in Brescia and the Serassi instrument in Bastia. He also recorded the organ concertos of Michel Corrette, and early 19th century theatrical and military music on the organ at Tende. He also made numerous other recordings on the Harmonia Mundi record label. Of particular importance was his work in the discovery and creating public awareness of the organs in the former county of Nice.
