= Church of St Louis, Rouen =

Church of St Louis
- Chapel of the Lycée Corneille
- Église Saint-Louis; Chapelle du Lycée Corneille
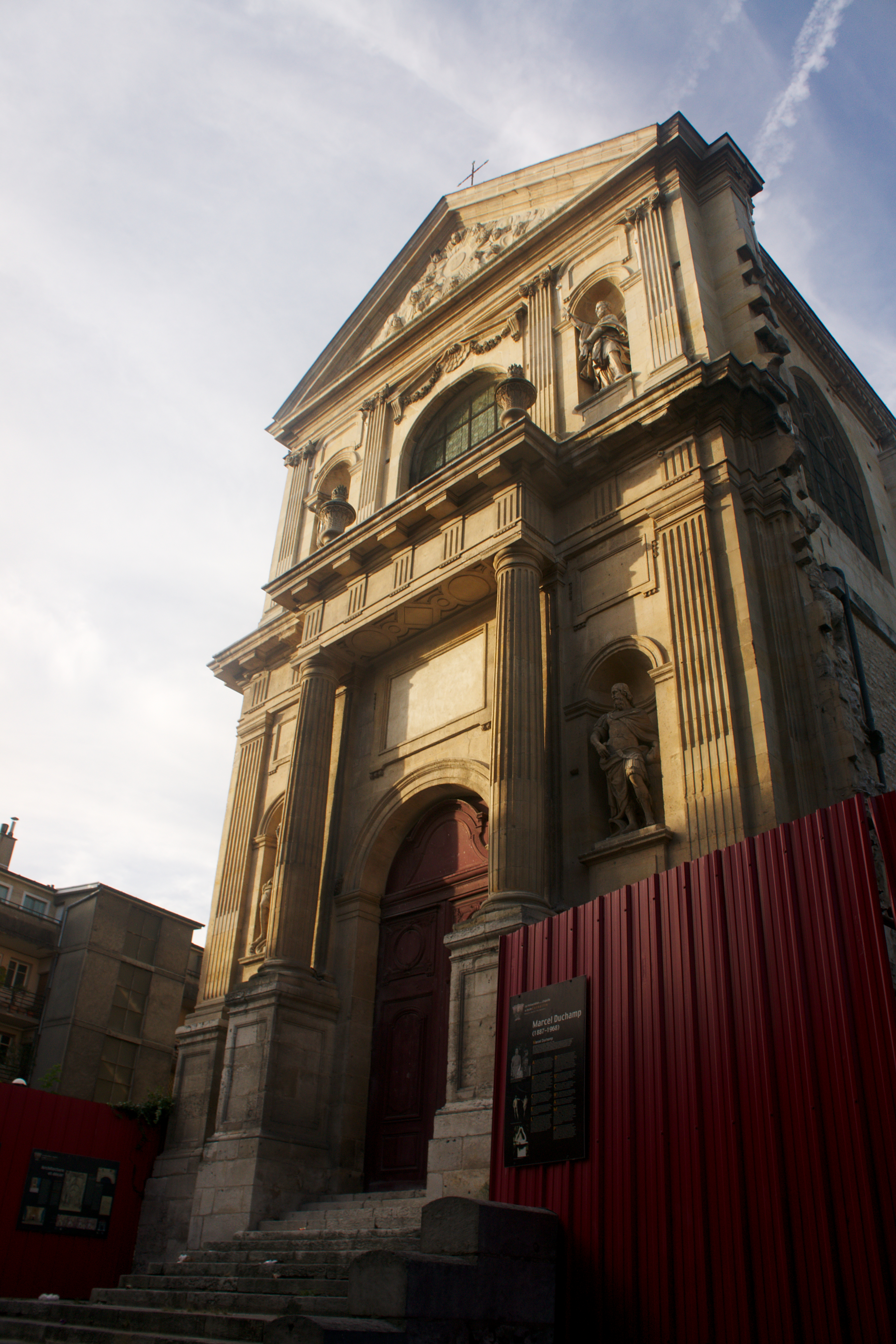
- Church undergoing restoration

- Location of Rouen' Saint-Louis Church in France.
- 49°26′40.75″N 1°6′0.64″E
- Location: 30 rue Bourg-l'Abbé; 76000 Rouen, Normandy
- Country: France
- Denomination: Roman Catholic
- Website: www.operaderouen.fr

History
- Status: Church
- Consecrated: 1704

Architecture
- Functional status: Defunct
- Heritage designation: Classée Monument Historique
- Designated: 1910
- Style: Flamboyant, Classical
- Groundbreaking: 1614
- Completed: 1725

Administration
- Archdiocese: Rouen
- Building details

General information
- Location: Rouen, Normandy

The Church of St Louis (French: Église Saint-Louis de Rouen), often referred as the Chapel of the Lycée Corneille (French: Chapelle du Lycée Corneille), was a Roman Catholic church in Rouen, Normandy, France. The building was formerly the chapel of the nearby Lycée Corneille. In 2016, it was turned into an auditorium.

== History ==
The first stone of the church of Saint Louis was laid in 1614 by Queen Marie de' Medici. The church was consecrated in 1704. The choir and the transept were completed by 1725.

The church was abandoned and stripped of all its furniture following the expulsion of the Jesuit community. In 1765, the organ was dismantled and taken to the Church of St Michael (Église Saint-Michel) in Pont-l'Évêque. Meanwhile, the altars were sold and are now located in the Church of the Holy Trinity (Église Saint-Trinité) in Pinterville.

The church was turned into a fodder store in 1793. In 1799 it served as a depository for Rouen's paintings, making it the first location of the city's Museum of Fine Arts.

After the building had become unsound, Rouen's city council envisaged its demolition in 1895 to free up space for an extension of the Lycée Corneille. The building was eventually saved when it was classified as monument historique in 1910.

From 1959 onwards, successive restoration campaigns took place to bring it back to its original state and allow for its doors to be reopened to the public. The building became a prized venue and welcomed several cultural events following the completion of the restorations.

In 2016, the venue was redeveloped into an auditorium, with cutting-edge sound reverberation technology.

== Architecture ==
=== Outside ===
The church is a blend of late Gothic architecture and Classical architecture. Its façade gives the impression of being incomplete. It owes this peculiarity to the narrow lot the church was built upon. The buildings which flanked the church at the time of the construction, and which restricted its extension, are long gone.

In terms of volume it is the third largest church in Rouen after the cathedral and the Church of Saint-Ouen as well as the third largest Jesuit church in France after that of the Professed House of Paris and that in Rennes.

In front of the façade, monumental stairs lead to the entrance. The main door is supported by two doric columns holding an entablature. The upper part boasts a semicircular arched openwork. The façade is crowned with a pediment. Statues depicting Saint Louis, Charlemagne, Ignatius of Loyola and Francis of Assisi are placed on top of the cornices.

=== Inside ===
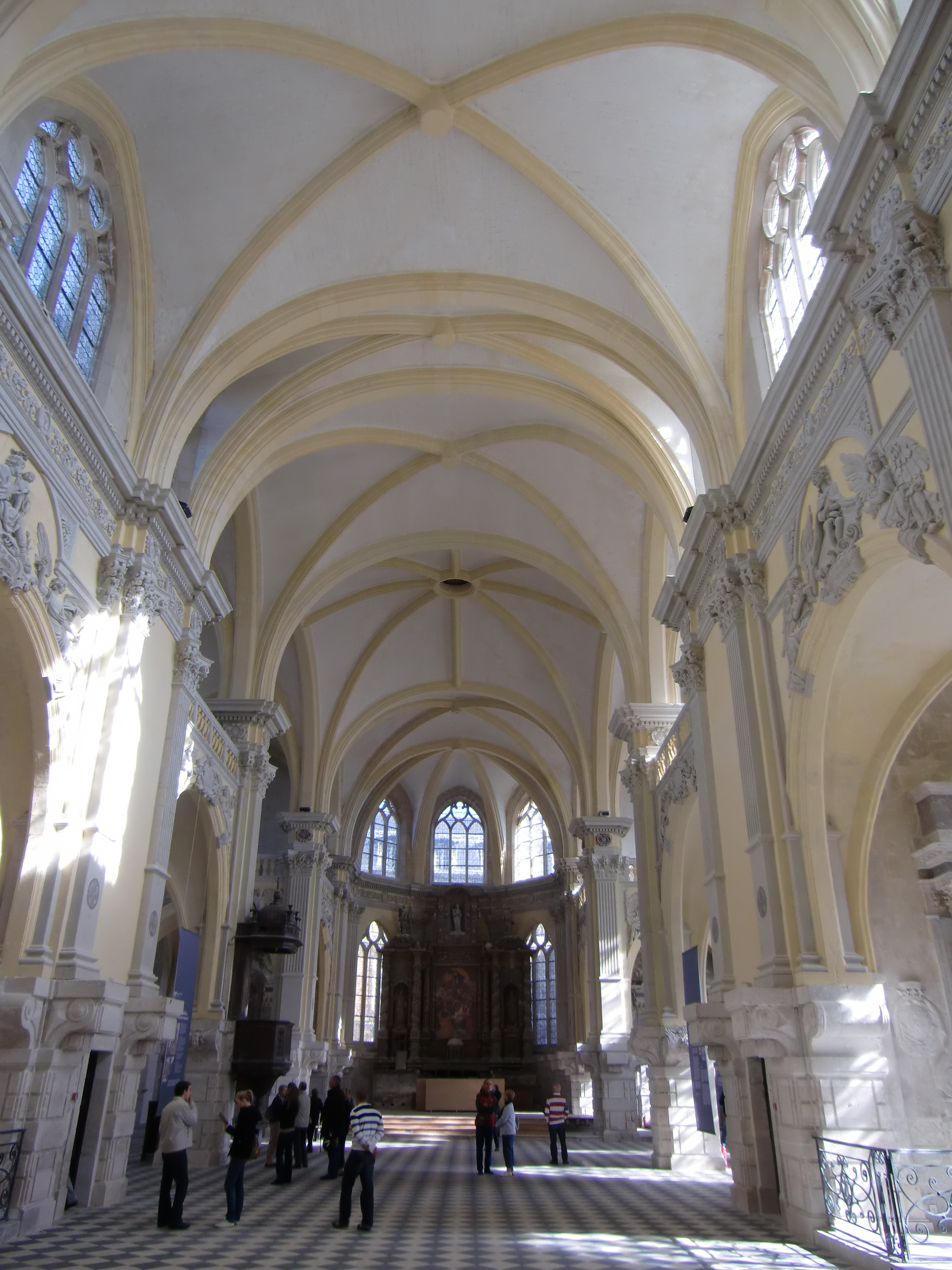
Nave of the chapel

The layout of the church is oriented on a north–south axis. The building is cross-shaped and has a 52m long single nave. The two southernmost chapels are of modest size. Then come two chapels: the chapel towards the north end has contained the tomb of François de Joyeuse since 1826. The chapel to the south possesses a retable akin to the one in the church of St. Ouen, representing the statue of Notre-Dame de Liesse. The artwork is ascribed to Guillaume de La Tremblaye who painted it for Saint-Ouen. A plaster-made depiction of Christ lies on top of it. Girardin's original sculpture was sold in 1765. The walls are clad in fine marble marquetry.

The chapels opposite the crossing are surmounted by rood screens, which are used as galleries.

The chapel west of the choir was in great part influenced by Robert de Cote's 1704 plan. The upper part of the doors surrounding the chapel's retable features the life of Ignatius of Loyola. The painting on the left-hand side of the door portrays Christ whereas the opposite painting shows Ignatius receiving the Blessed Sacrament.

The choir houses a retable from the second half of the 17th century made out of timber. Unfortunately, the altar, like other parts of the church, was sold.

The chequered floor is built out of slate and travertine. The reconstruction of the stained glass windows was funded by donations from a private organization.

== See also ==
- List of Jesuit sites
