= Corneille's Chapel =

Corneille's Chapel Auditorium of Normandy
- The Auditorium's logo

- Location within France

General information
- Type: Auditorium
- Architectural style: Late Gothic architecture, Flamboyant and Classical
- Location: 30, rue Bourg-l'Abbé; 76000 Rouen, France
- Coordinates: 49.4447°N 1.1002°E
- Current tenants: Rouen Opera House
- Inaugurated: 5 February 2016
- Owner: Normandy

Corneille's Chapel (French: Chapelle Corneille), formally known as Corneille's Chapel, Auditorium of Normandy (French: Chapelle Corneille, Auditorium de Normandie), is an auditorium, formerly Saint-Louis Church, located in the northeast of the city centre of Rouen, Normandy.

== Specifications ==
The building can contain an audience of up to 700 people (depending on the configuration of the event). It welcomes live performances of chamber music as well as contemporary music. The French chamber choir Accentus, in residence at and partly fostered by the Rouen Opera House, often performs at this venue when in Rouen. Also, the hall utilizes recent sound technologies, including a unique and state-of-the-art 6.5m wide sound-reflecting sphere, built to enhance the audience experience. The auditorium is housed in the 17th century Chapel of the Lycée Corneille, a building listed as Monument Historique. The venue is run together by the Rouen Opera House and Normandy's Governing Bodies.

== See also ==
- Saint-Louis Church, Rouen
