= Joseph Uchard =

French architect (1809–1891)

François Joseph Uchard (30 October 1809, Paris - 16 February 1891, Paris), known as Joseph Uchard, was a French architect. His projects include the completion of Saint-François Xavier des Missions étrangères.

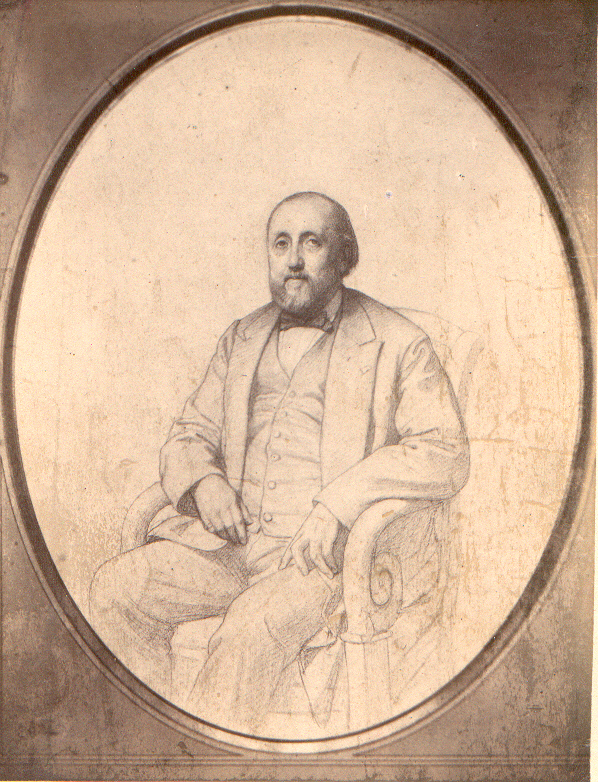
Joseph Uchard (1809-1891)
