= Saint-François-Xavier, Paris =

Coordinates: 48°51′2″N 2°18′48″E

St Francis Xavier
- St Francis Xavier of the Foreign Missions
- Saint-François-Xavier (in French)
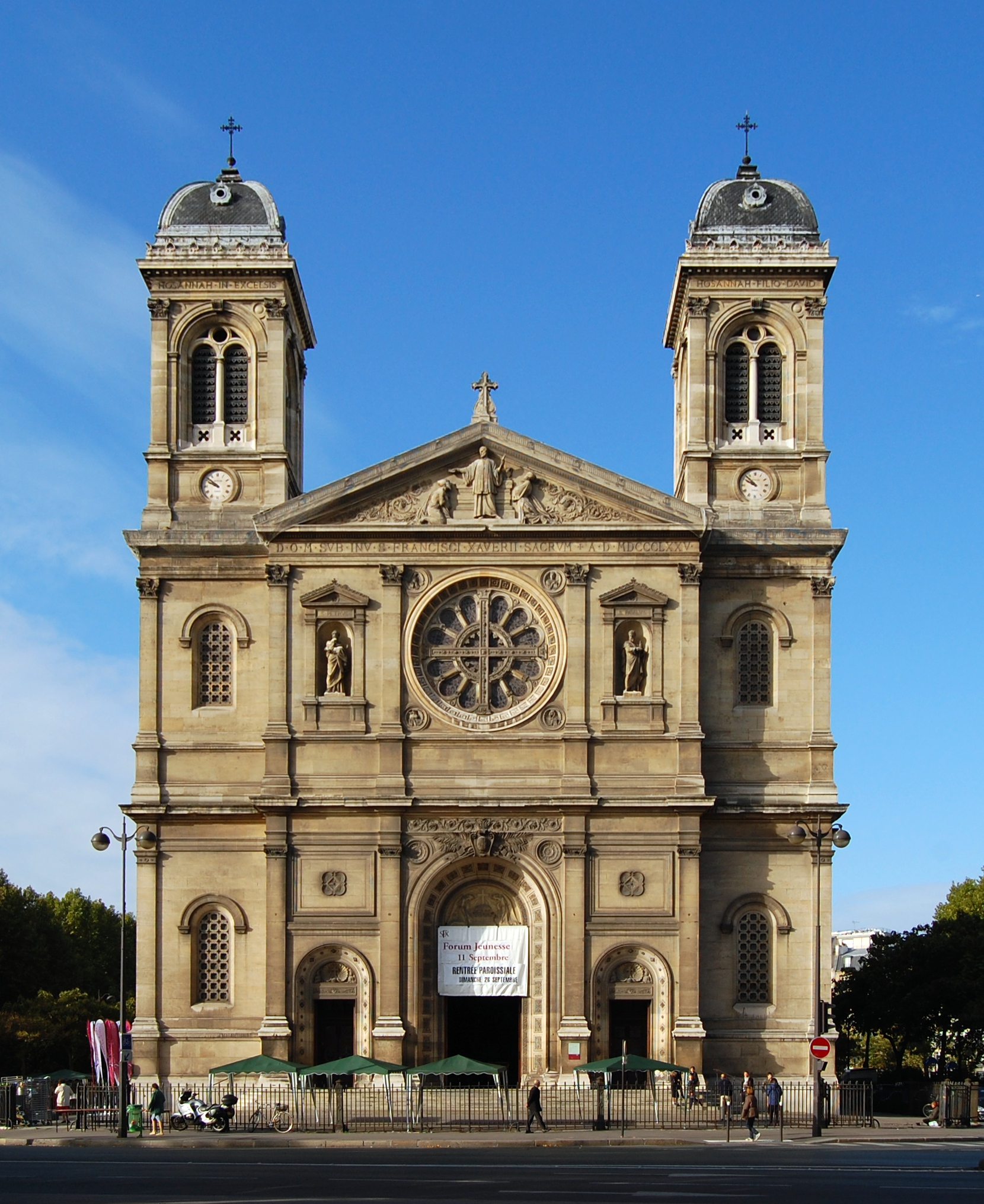
- Location: Paris, Île-de-France
- Country: France
- Denomination: Roman Catholic
- Website: www.sfx-paris.fr

History
- Status: Parish church
- Dedication: Francis Xavier
- Consecrated: 23 May 1894

Architecture
- Functional status: Active
- Architect(s): Adrien Lusson; Joseph Uchard
- Groundbreaking: 1861
- Completed: 1873

Administration
- Province: Province of Paris
- Archdiocese: Archdiocese of Paris
- Deanery: Orsay-Breteuil

Clergy
- Rector: Mgr Bruno Lefèvre-Pontalis

St Francis Xavier Church (French: Église Saint-François-Xavier or Église Saint-François-Xavier-des-Missions-étrangères) is a parish Roman Catholic church in the 7th arrondissement of Paris dedicated to Francis Xavier, the patron saint of missions. Built in the late 19th century, it gave its name to the nearby Metro station Saint-François-Xavier. It contains the tomb of Madeleine Sophie Barat, a French saint of the Catholic Church and founder of the Society of the Sacred Heart, a worldwide religious institute of educators. It is also known for its collection of Italian Baroque and Mannerist paintings, including a work by Tintoretto. The church was inscribed as an historic monument in 2018.

== History ==
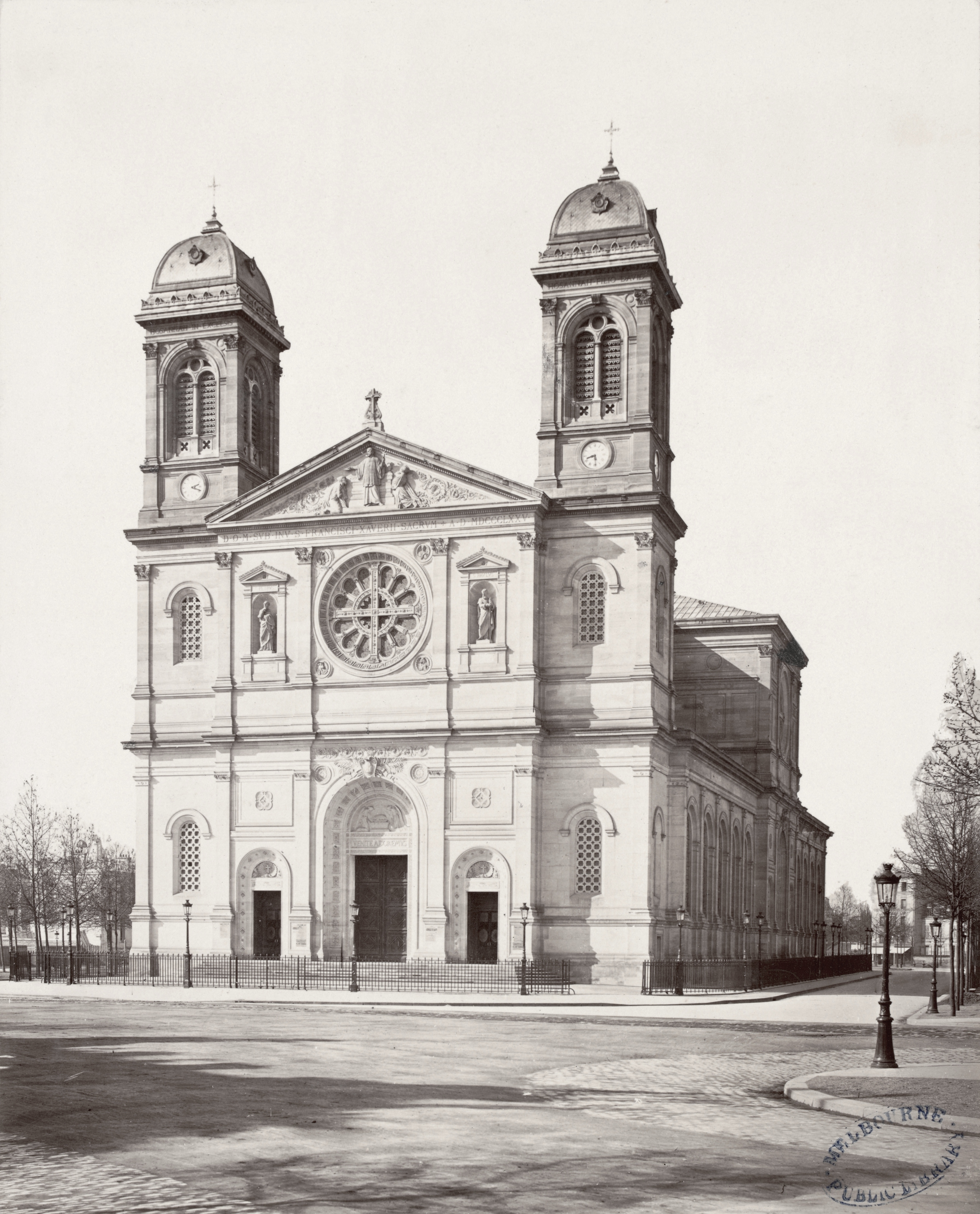
The new church between 1853 and 1870

The church takes its name from Saint François Xavier (1506-1582), who was a professor in Paris when he met Ignace de Loyola, the founder of the Jesuit Order in 1553. Inspired by Loyola, he was ordained as priest, and became a foreign missionary, travelling to Italy, India and Japan, and died in Canton, China in 1552. He was canonized in 1552. He is the patron saint of missionaries, sailors and tourists.

In 1637, as part of the Counter-Reformation movement, a seminary to train missionaries was organised on the rue du Bac in Paris by Bishop Dubal, with the support of Pope Urban VIII. The chapel of the seminary was built between 1683 and 1689, with decoration by Jacques Stella, Nicolas Poussin and Simon Vouet.

A séminaire destiné à former des missionnaires à l’apostolat en pays lointains (seminary for foreign missions) had been set up on rue du Bac in 1637 by Monseigneur Duval, with an accord from pope Urban VIII, during the Counter Reformation. The seminary's oratory or chapel was built between 1683 and 1689, with interior decoration by notable artists, including Jacques Stella, Nicolas Poussin and Simon Vouet, During the French Revolution, when the parish church, Saint-Sulpice was closed down, the chapel secretly served as the parish church. In 1801 the chapel was attached to the church of Saint-Thomas-d’Aquin, which became the church for the Faubourg Saint-Germain. In 1802 the new Foreign Missions" parish was officially separated from the parish of Saint Sulpice.

In 1842, the parish was renamed Saint Francis Xavier. However, the chapel soon became too cramped for the seminarians and parishioners to share, and the parishioners began construction on a new church in 1861. It was part of a large project of Paris church construction launched by Emperor Louis Napoleon that accompanied the Emperor's other grand program, Haussmann's renovation of Paris.

The site chosen for the new church was selected to fit into an intersection of Haussmann's new boulevards. The Boulevard des Invalides and a new boulevard were designed to cross the and to meet the Seine level with the Pont du Carrousel. The new church was intended as the ending point of the new boulevard, though the work was not entirely carried out as intended. The construction was begun under Abbé Jean-Louis Roquette, with architect Adrien Lusson in charge. It was halted for a time in 1861, then resumed by architect Joseph Uchard.

Before the above-ground work began, Uchard saw that the structure of the church would be hindered by the design of the new boulevards. The proposed site was an elongated hexagon, long enough for the church but very narrow at the west front, with no room for a proper portal and towers. Uchard asked Haussman's city planners to alter the new street plan to allow a wider west front. which they did. The work resumed and on the exterior of the church was completed on 15 July 1874. The building was finished by Easter 1875, though the interior decor was still not complete. It was consecrated on 23 May 1894, the eve of Corpus Christi, in a ceremony presided over by François-Marie-Benjamin Richard, archbishop of Paris.

== Exterior ==
The exterior was modelled after the Italian basilicas of the Renaissance, with the modern advantage of an iron frame hidden by the stone walls, allowing less massive walls, more interior space, and larger windows. The triangular fronton is decorated with sculpture illustrating Saint Francois-Xavier baptising inhabitants of India and Japan.

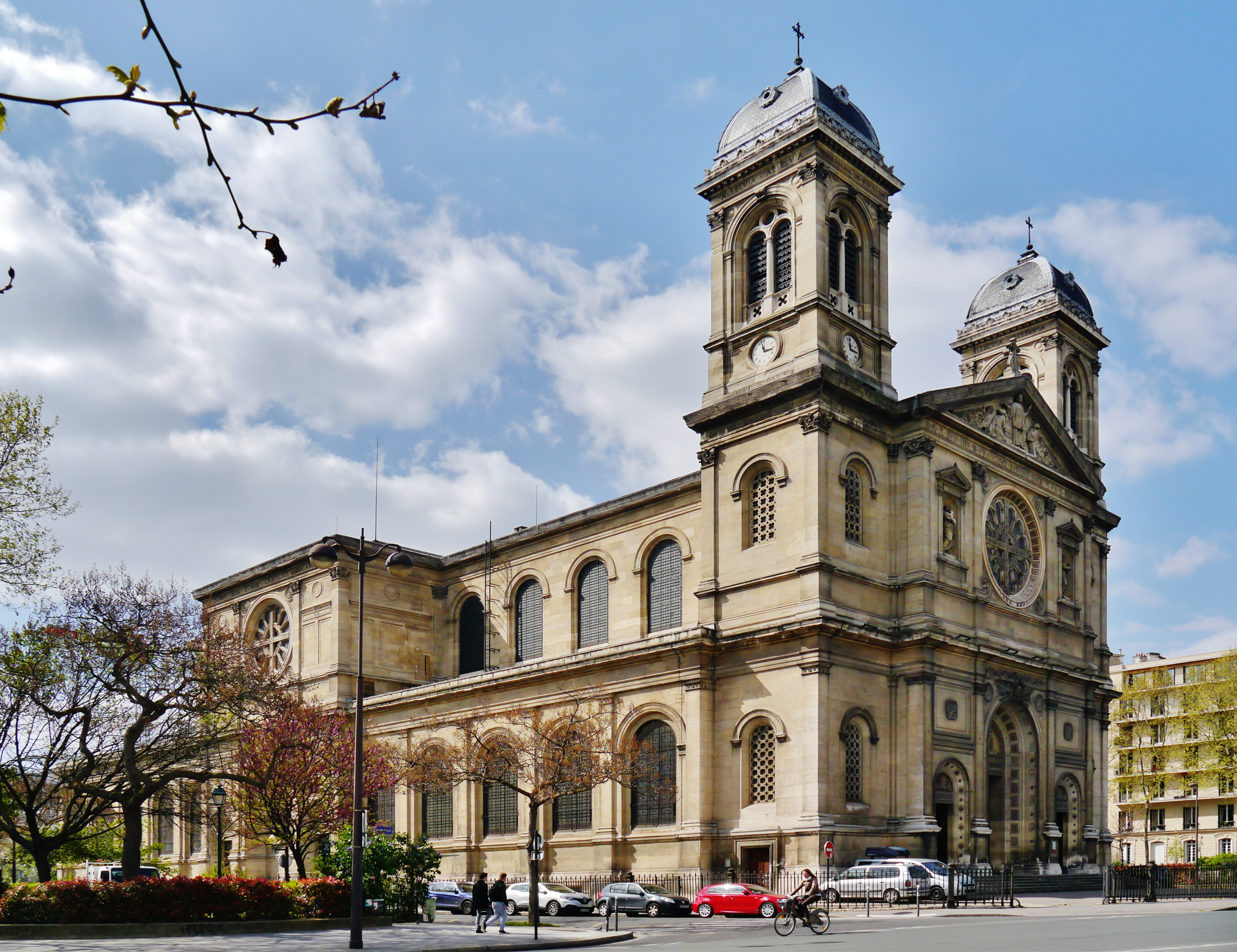
South side of church

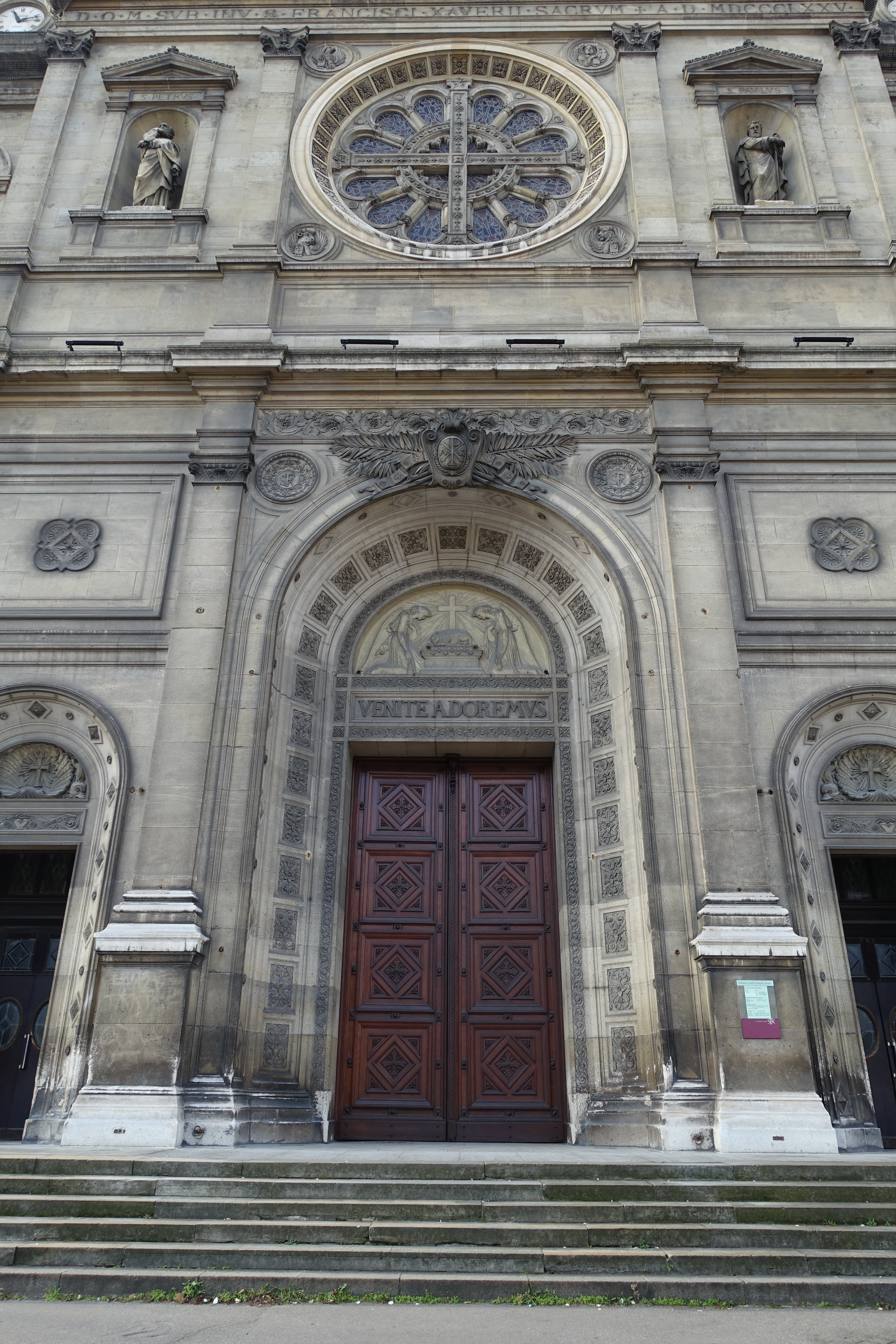
The west portal

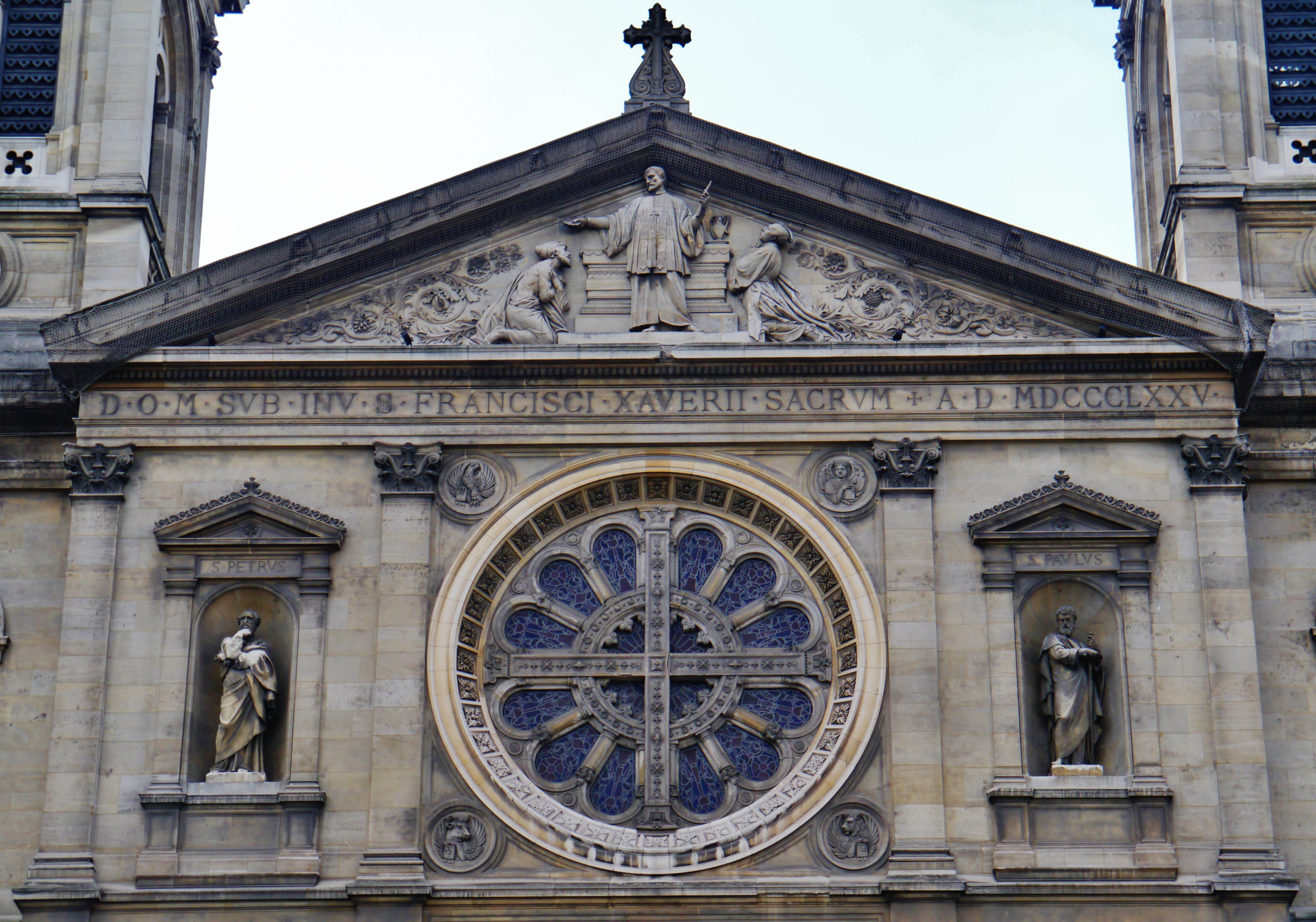
West fronton with sculpture of Saint Francois-Xavier preaching in Japan and India by Gabriel-Jules Thomas

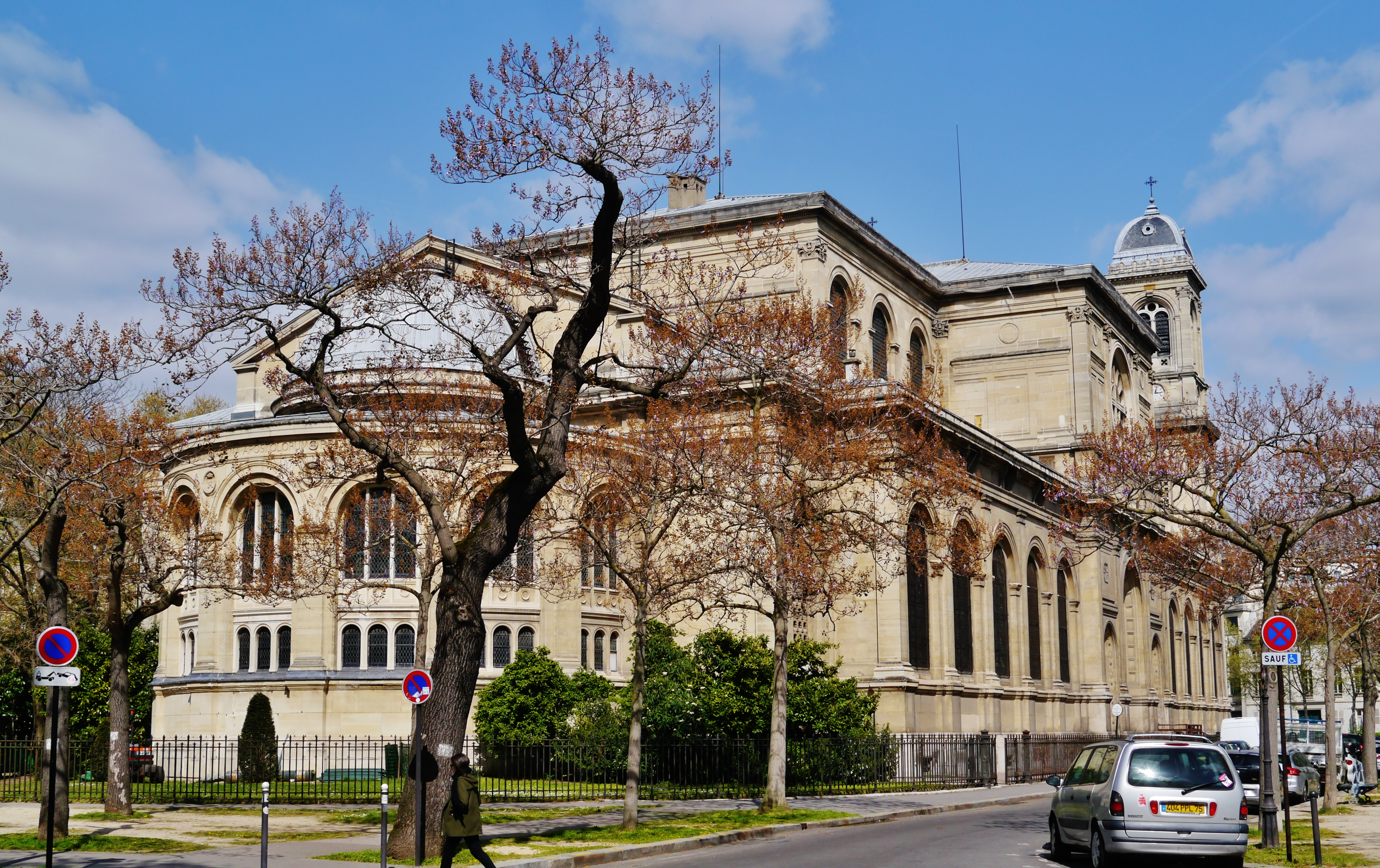
The apse at the east end containing the Chapel of the Virgin

== Interior ==
The nave is flanked by two lower aisles lined by chapels, separated from the nave by massive pillars with Corinthian capitals. The decor of the nave is largely Neo-classical in design, with while the adjoining Chapel of the Virgin, at the east end, is decorated in Renaissance style. The iron structure of the church, hidden by the stone walls, makes possible the larger windows and abundance of light.

The interior is dominated by the massive theatrical arch over the choir and the altar, painted with a frieze by Romain Cazes (1808-1881), depicting Two Angels supporting the Book of the Evangelists. The figures of the angels stand out from the floral background behind them, which is decorated with the symbols of the angels. The frieze was inspired by the ornamental designs of illuminated manuscripts. A second major decorative element is the wall above the altar, with a painting of Moses and the tablets of the Ten Commandments, accompanied by figures of an angel appearing in a burning bush, and a figure of Aaron, holding rods, instruments of Biblical punishment.

Above these scenes a large painting entitled Saint Francois-Xavier presents to Christ the peoples he has converted. The figure of Christ is modelled after Byzantine figures, and the figures painted below feature the colorful costumes of countries where Saint Fraocois-Xavier made converts: India, Japan and China. The interior of the cupola over the altar and the ceilings also have lavish paintings, depicting the twelve apostles, around a lamb. The dome interior was painted in the Neo-Byzantine style by Charles Lemeire.

The bronze altar piece is a modern work in the classical style by the sculptor Poussielegue-Rustand, installed in 1984.

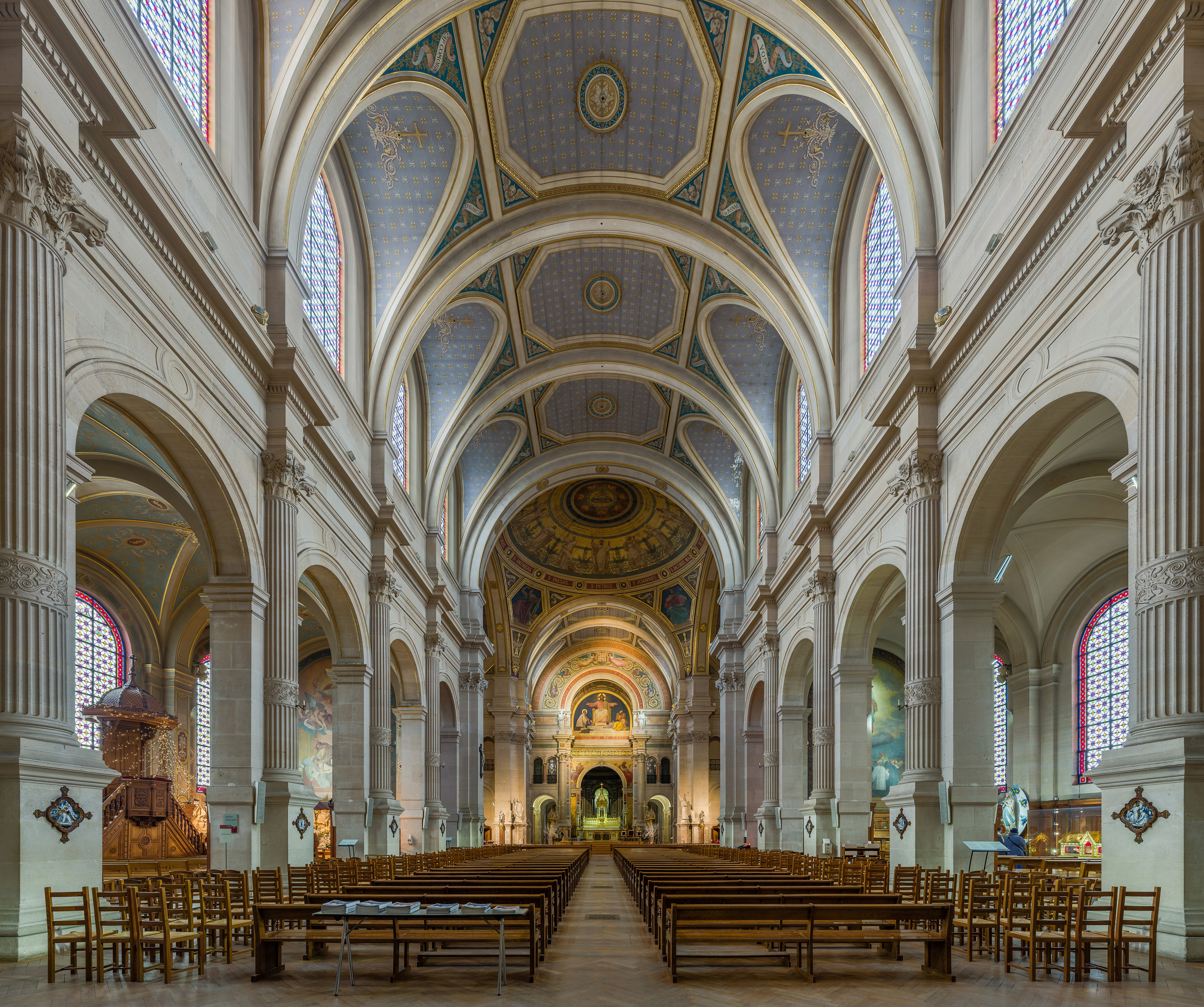
The nave, facing the altar

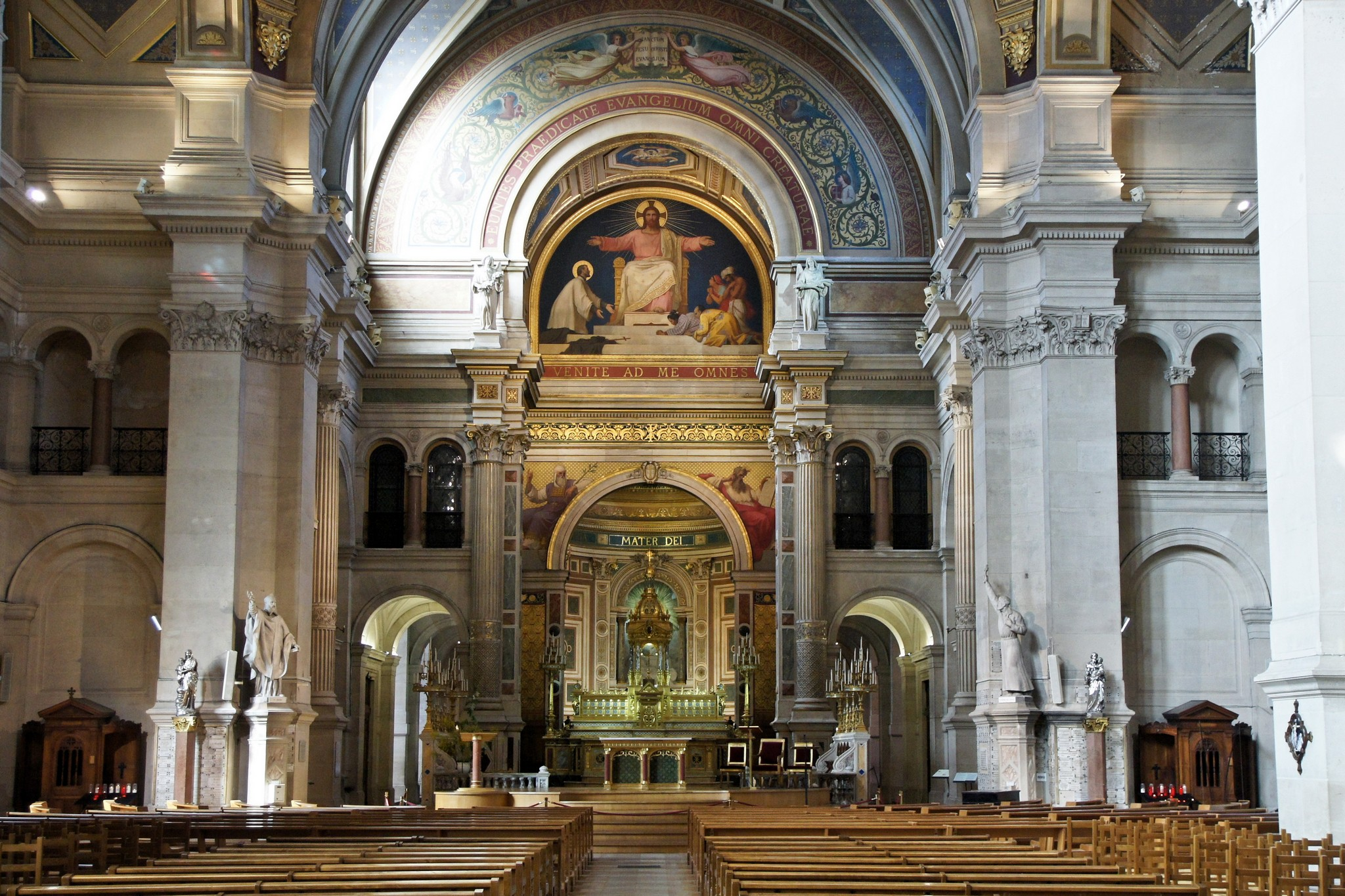
The choir and altar seen from the nave

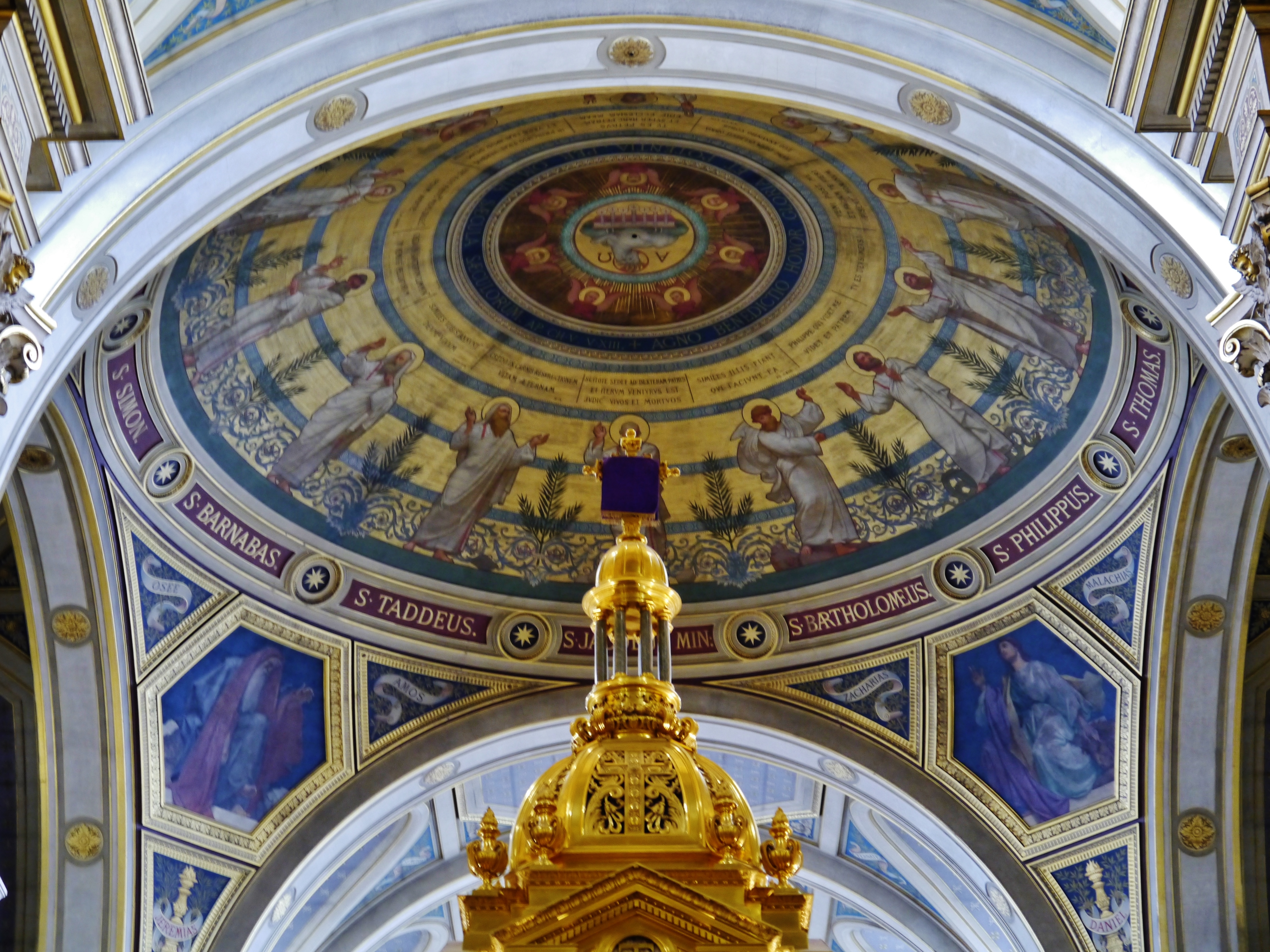
Interior of the cupola, with paintings of the twelve apostles

== Chapels ==
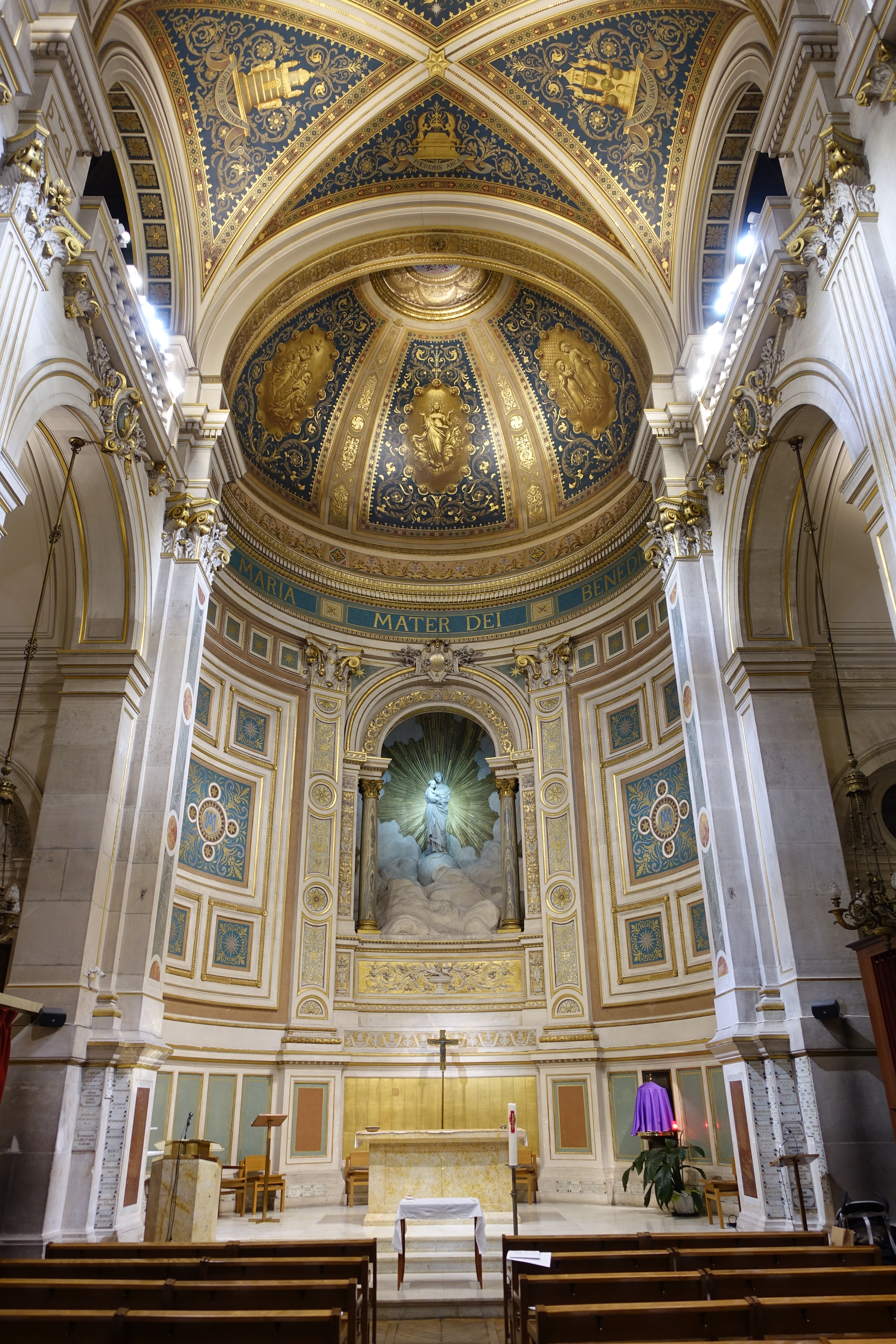
The Chapel of the Virgin in the apse

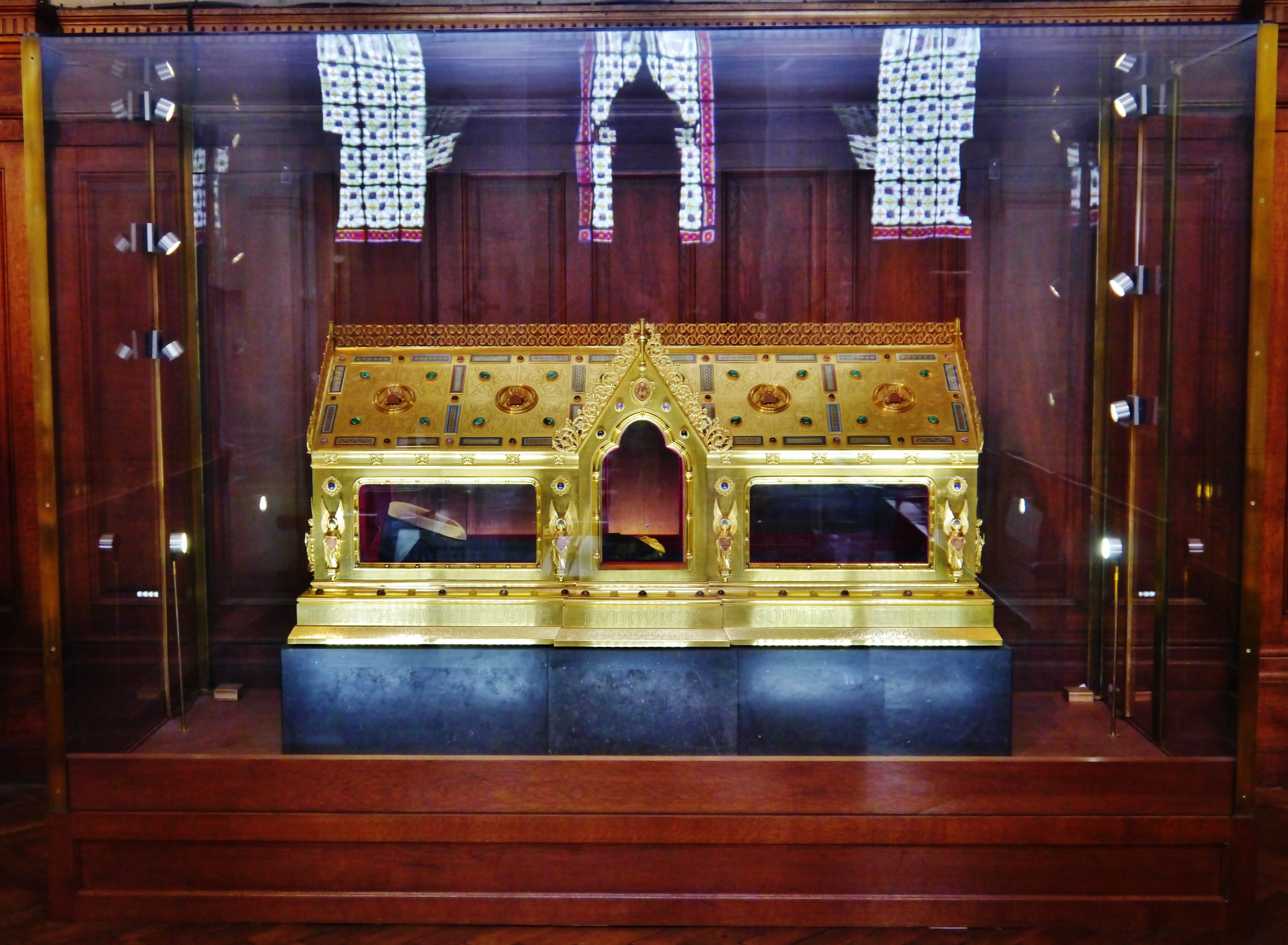
The shrine and reliquary of Saint Madeleine-Sophie Barat, founder of the Society of the Sacred Heart

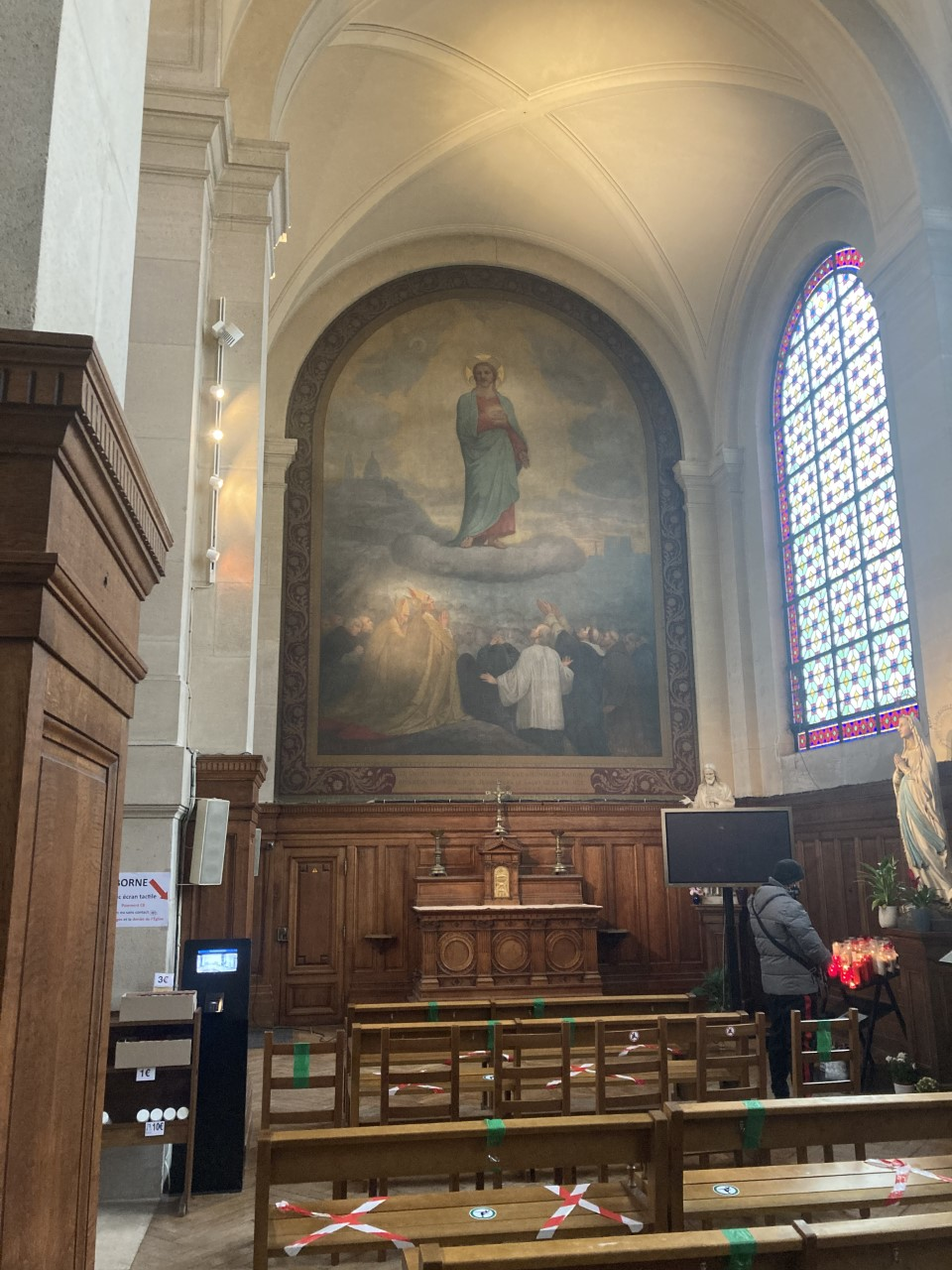
The Chapel of the Sacred Heart

A chapel in the church displays the shrine and reliquary of Saint Madeleine-Sophie Barat (1779-1865), the founder of the Society of the Sacred Heart dedicated to the religious education of young women. The first school was opened in 1801. As of 2015, the society had 2600 members, most serving as teachers, particularly for girls, in forty-one countries. The reliquary contains her remains and other relics of her life. The shrine was transferred to the church in 2009, to be close to her Paris home, the site of the congregation (now the Rodin Museum), and one of her early schools, now the Lycée Victor-Duruy.

== Art and decoration ==
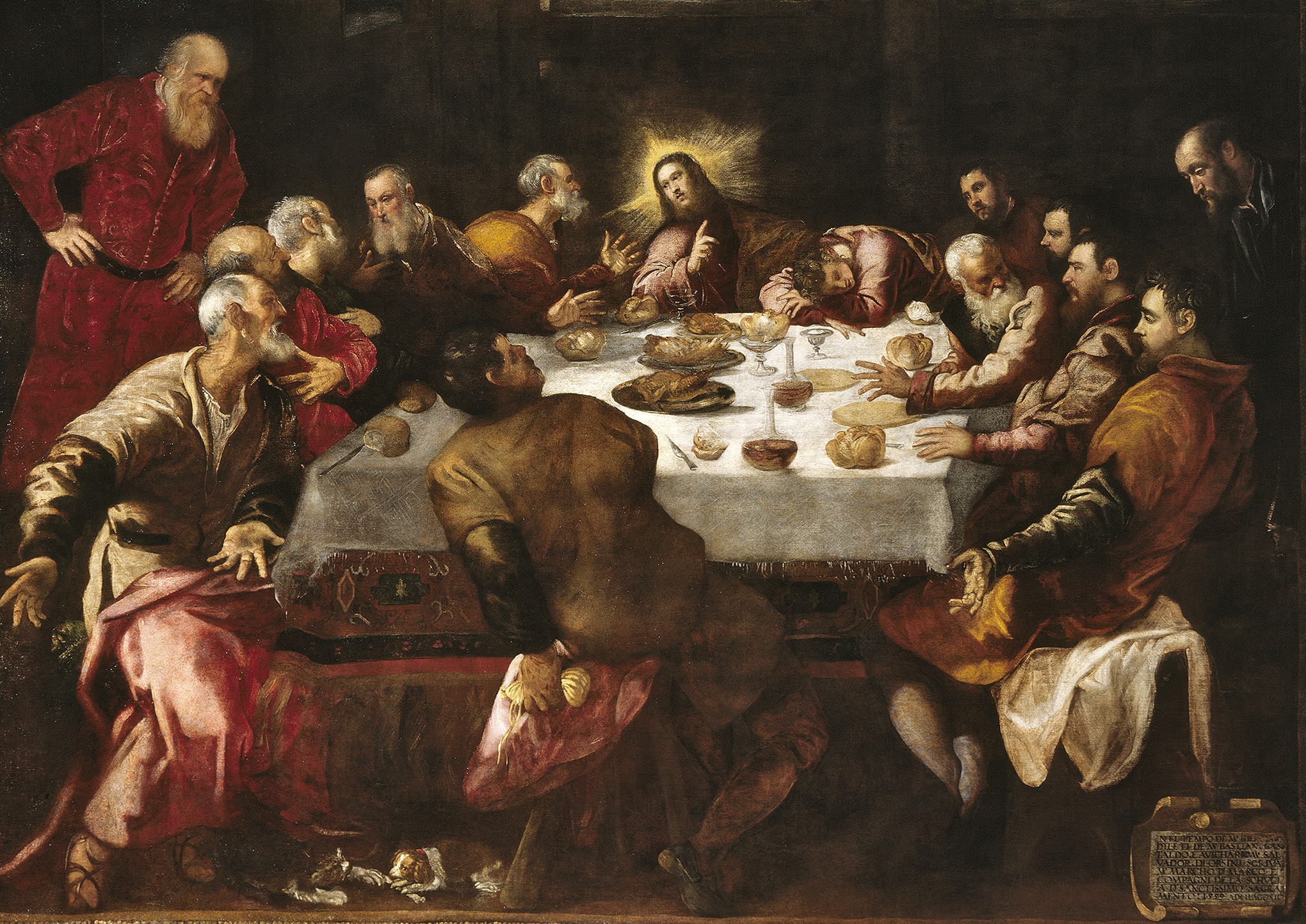
The Last Supper by Tintoretto (1559)

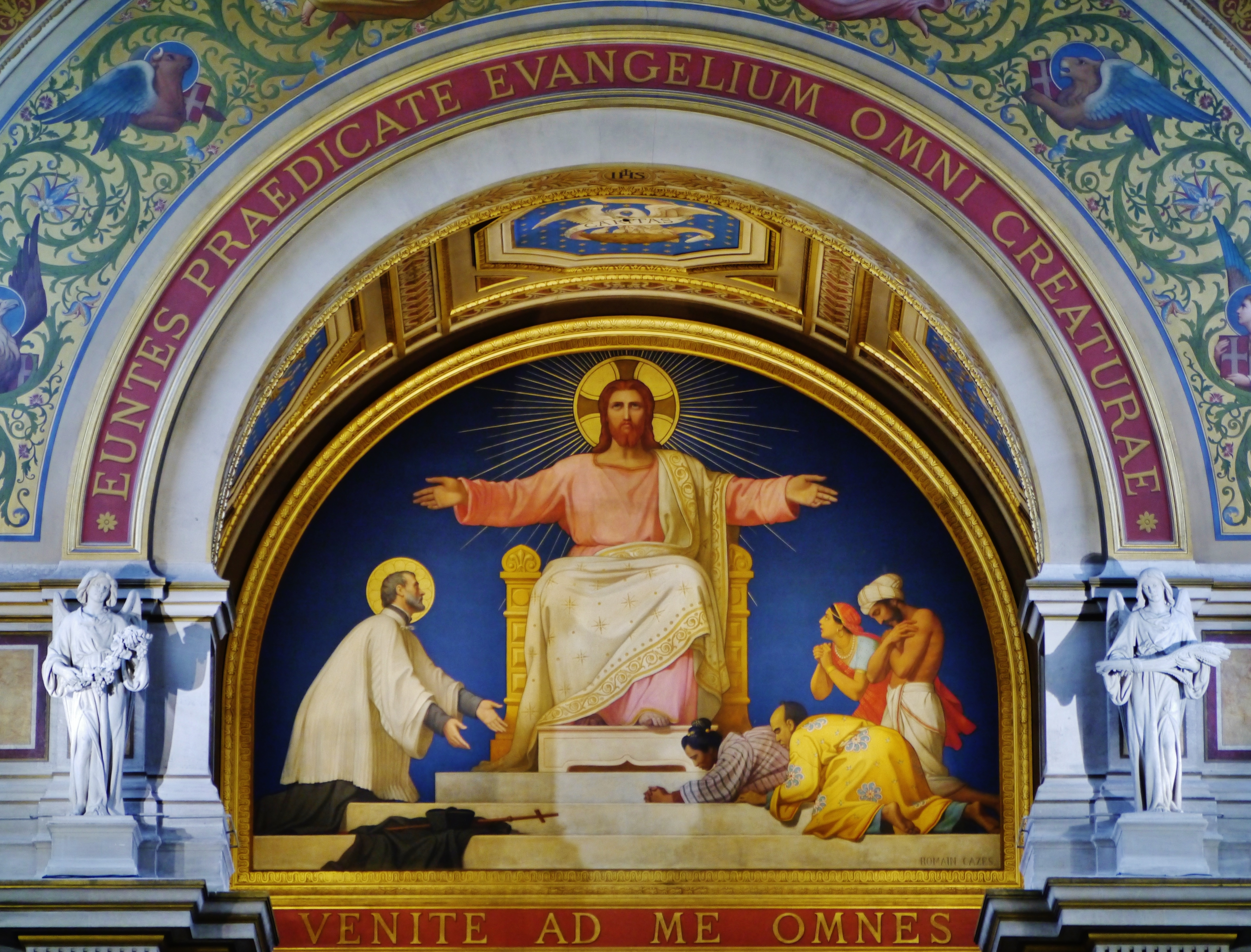
Christ and Saint-Francis-Xavier, in the Neo-Byzantine style

The most famous work in the church is The Last Supper by Tintoretto (1518–1594). It depicts the moment that Christ reveals to the Disciples that Judas has betrayed him. The figure of Judas, in the foreground, holds behind him the purse of money he received for his betrayal. It was originally painted for the Scuola Dei Santissime in the Church of Sain Felice in Venice in 1559, and was brought to Paris in 1865 by Marie-Caroline of Bourbon-Two Sicilies, Duchess of Berry.

The chapels of the church are filled with works of art, dating from the Renaissance to the 20th century. The Chapel of Saint Louis displays a major work by the Baroque painter Luca Giordano (1632–1705), The Crucifixion of Saint Peter. Following the school of Caravaggio and Ribera, the painting depicts the corpse of the saint in dramatic fashion, in the night, head down, being removed from the cross.

The chapels on the left aisle also contain notable works, including The Apotheosis of Saint Gaetan of Thiene, by Claude Audran the Younger (1639–1684). His academic style resembles that of his close collaborator Charles Le Brun. Audran was a classicist like Le Brun, but used warmer colors and lyrical arrangements which recalled the baroque art of Simon Vouet. Audran's works also decorate the grand stairway at the Palace of Versailles.

Another important Baroque work found in the church is The Virgin and Child with John the Baptist and Saint Genevieve, by Lubin Baugin (1612–1663), located in the Sacristy of Masses. This work shows the influence of Correggio. It originally hung over the altar in Notre Dame de Paris until the French Revolution.

== Organ ==
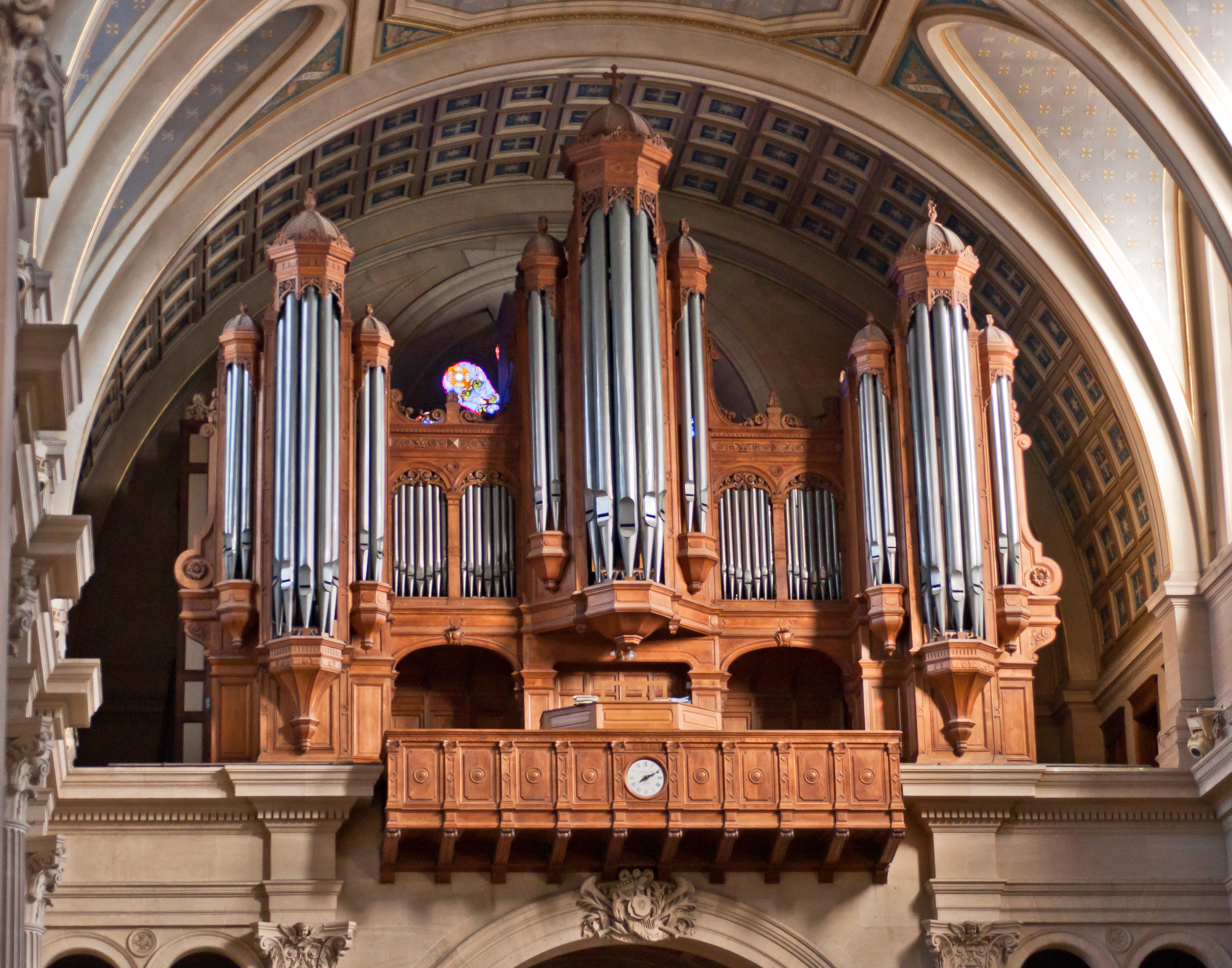
The principal organ

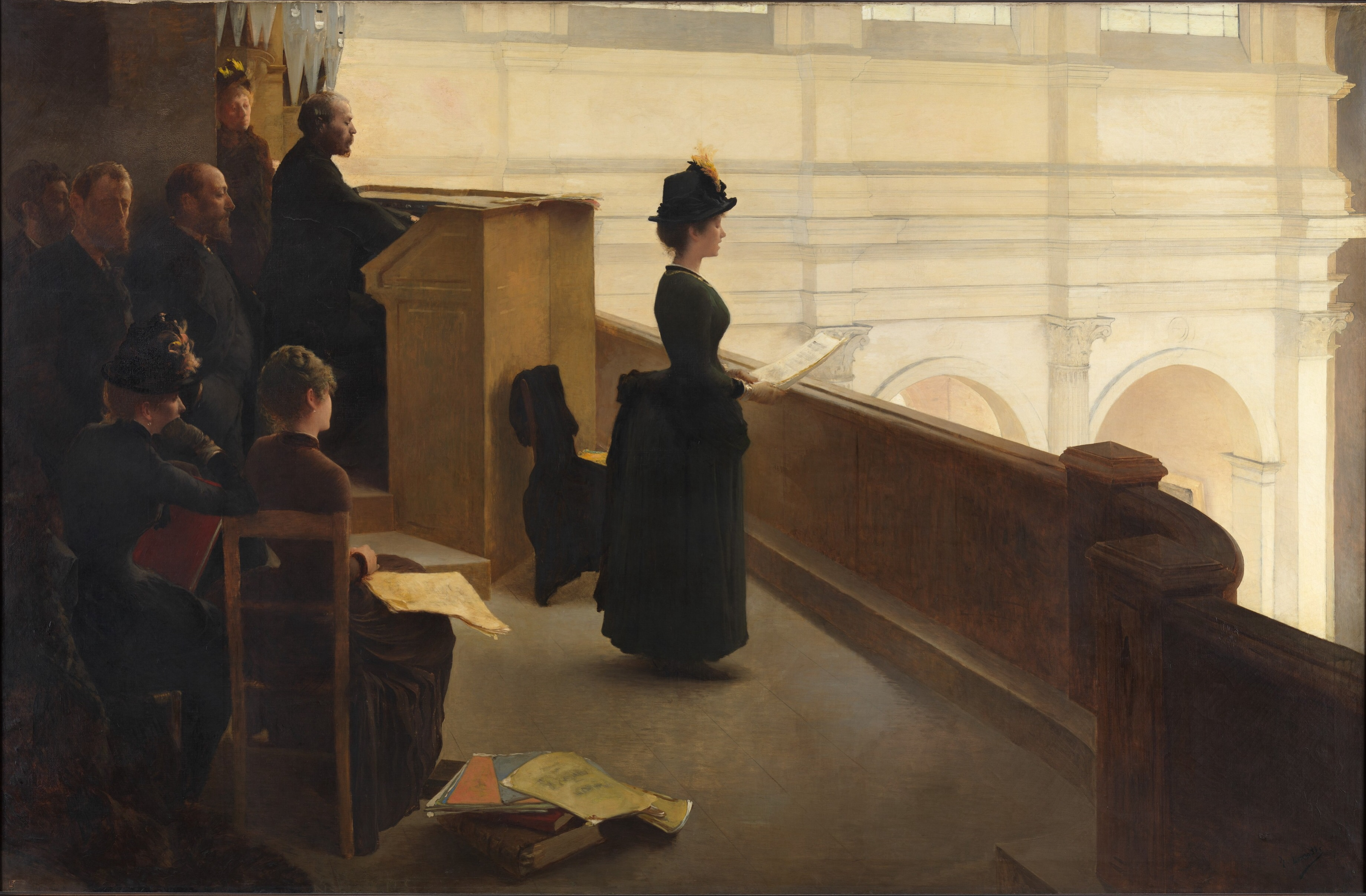
The Organ Rehearsal, depicting the church organ, by Henry Lerolle (1885), now in the Metropolitan Museum of Art

The main organ is located in the rear of nave, over the portal. It was built in 1878 by the firm of Fermis and Persil. It was modified in 1830, again in 1923, and then was entirely restored beginning in 1993. The restored organ was inaugurated in 1996.

The organ of Saint-François Xavier church is featured in the painting The Organ Rehearsal, a work by Henry Lerolle shown at the Paris Salon of 1885, then in 1887 at the first exhibit of impressionist art in the United States, at the Metropolitan Museum. The painting was purchased and donated to the Metropolitan Museum, where it is displayed today.

=== Organists ===
The following have served as organist of Saint-François Xavier church since 1878:

- 1878–1891: Albert Renaud
- 1891–1941: Adolphe Marty
- 1941–1946: Achille Philip
- 1946–1994: Gaston Litaize
- 1994–present: Denis Comtet

== Bibliography (in French) ==
- Dumoulin, Aline; Ardisson, Alexandra; Maingard, Jérôme; Antonello, Murielle; Églises de Paris (2010), Éditions Massin, Issy-Les-Moulineaux, ISBN 978-2-7072-0683-1
- Hillairet, Jacques; Connaissance du Vieux Paris; (2017); Éditions Payot-Rivages, Paris; (in French). ISBN 978-2-2289-1911-1

== See also ==
- List of historic churches in Paris
