= Rouen Philharmonic Orchestra =

French symphony orchestra

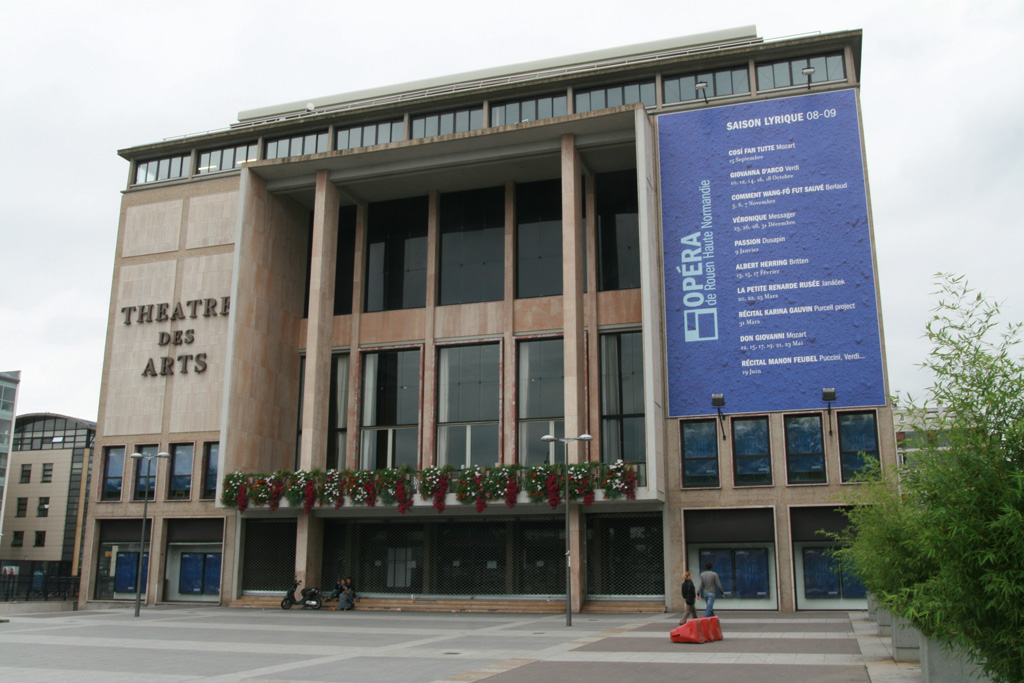
- Théâtre des Arts building which houses the orchestra
- Native name: Orchestre de l'Opéra de Rouen Normandie
- Founded: 1998
- Location: Rouen, Normandy, France
- Concert hall: Rouen Opera House
- Principal conductor: Ben Glassberg
- Website: www.operaderouen.fr/la-maison/lorchestre/

The Rouen Philharmonic Orchestra (French: Orchestre de l'Opéra de Rouen Normandie) is a symphony orchestra based in Rouen in Normandy, France. It is housed in the Rouen Opera House.

Founded in 1998 by Austrian conductor Oswald Sallaberger, the orchestra is one of France's leading musical institutions. British conductor Ben Glassberg was offered the conductorship and his appointment was effective from the commencement of the 2020–2021 season.

== Orchestra ==
Overview

The orchestra was formed in 1998 by Oswald Sallaberger in an endeavour to organize a professional orchestra in the city of Rouen.

Based on a Mozart formation, the orchestra is made up of more than 40 permanent musicians. It is often reinforced by additional non-permanent artists, enriching the breadth of the orchestra and allowing for special musical programs and events requiring a larger ensemble.

The orchestra is alternately conducted by its current musical director, Leo Hussain, or by local and foreign guest conductors who impulse a continuously renewed and refreshed approach to music.

Repertoire

The orchestra's scope ranges from Baroque music to contemporary music. They notably performed Wagner's Der fliegende Holländer and Britten's Curlew River.

Specificity

The orchestra also organizes concerts requiring catgut strings instruments and traditional bows, offering musicians the opportunity to fully express their talents. The orchestra also highly encourages its musicians to further develop their technicality and widen their personal scope by programming concerts of chamber music and allowing them to perform as soloists. It is France's first orchestra to offer that alternative.

International recognition

It holds musical performances worldwide, either in Normandy, in other regions of France or in overseas countries. The orchestra has toured to cities such as Bruges, Brussels, Delhi, Hanover, Havana, Luxembourg, New York City and Paris. The orchestra benefits from international recognition and was acclaimed on numerous occasions for the professionalism displayed in its rendition of musical masterpieces.

== Musical direction ==
=== Current directorship ===
Ben Glassberg was appointed conductor of the orchestra upon the termination of Hussain's contract. The orchestra's founding director, Oswald Sallaberger, is still closely involved in the running of the musical institution.

=== Former directors ===
- 1998–2011 : Oswald Sallaberger (Austrian)
- 2011–2014 : Luciano Acocella (Italian)
- 2014–2020 : Leo Hussain (British)

== Guest conductors ==
=== Former guest conductors ===
- 2002–2005 : David Stern, principal guest conductor (American)

== Musicians ==
=== Permanent musicians ===
Violin

- Jane Peters, leader (Australian)
- Teona Kharadze, principal second violin (Georgian)
- Hervé Walczak Le Sauder, principal second violin (French)
- Tristan Benveniste, co-leader second violin (French)
- Hélène Bordeaux, violin (French)
- Elena Chesneau, violin (Russian)
- Nathalie Demarest, violin
- Alice Estienne-Hotellier, violin (French)
- Etienne Hotellier, violin (French)
- Marc Lemaire, violin (French)
- Elena Pease, violin
- Laurent Soler, violin (French)
- Pascale Thiébaux, violin (French)

Viola

- Patrick Dussart, soloist viola
- Agathe Blondel, soloist viola (French)
- Thierry Corbier, viola (French)
- Stéphanie Lalizet, viola (French)
- Cédric Rousseau, viola (French)

Cello

- Florent Audibert, soloist cello (French)
- Anaël Rousseau, soloist cello (French)
- Jacques Perez, cello (French)
- Hélène Latour, cello (French)

Bass

- Gwendal Etrillard, soloist bass (French)
- Baptiste Andrieu, bass (French)

Flute

- Jean-Christophe Falala, soloist flute (French)
- Kouchyar Shahroudi, flute (Iranian)

Oboe

- Jérôme Laborde, soloist oboe (French)
- Fabrice Rousson, oboe (French)

Clarinet

- Naoko Yoshimura, soloist clarinet (Japanese)
- Florianne Tardy, clarinet

Bassoon

- Batiste Arcaix, soloist bassoon (French)

Horn

- Pierre-Olivier Goll, soloist horn (French)
- Eric Lemardeley, horn (French)

Trumpet

- Franck Paque, soloist trumpet (French)
- Patrice Antonangelo, trumpet (French)

Timpani

- Philippe Bajard, soloist timpani (French)
