= Florence Baschet =

French composer of contemporary music

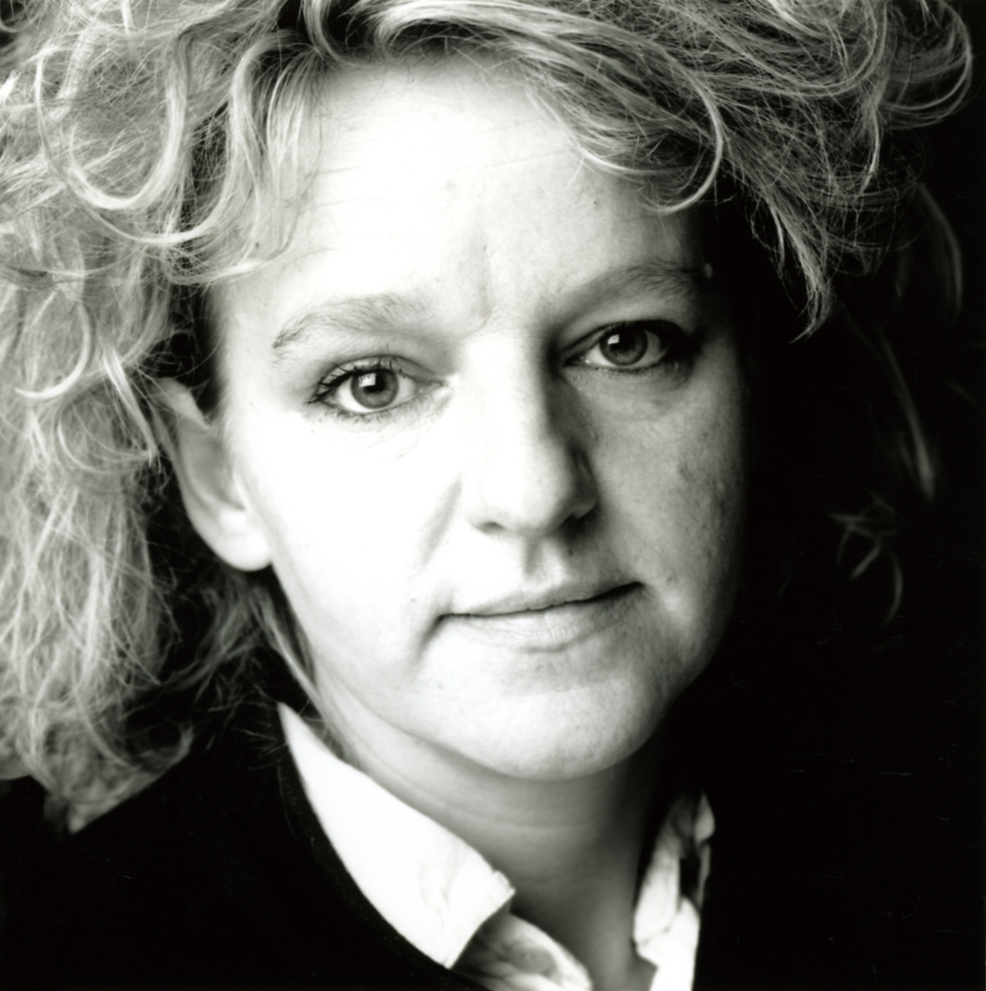
Florence Baschet ©Marco Delogu

Florence Baschet (born 18 June 1955) is a French composer of contemporary music.

== Life ==
Born in Paris, Baschet began her musical studies at the École normale de musique de Paris and at the Accademia Nazionale di Santa Cecilia in Rome, then in musicology, in harmony and counterpoint in Paris. She entered the Conservatoire national supérieur musique et danse de Lyon in 1988 (SONVS department) where she studied musical composition and sound transformations by electroacoustic means. In 1991, she won the First prize in composition and computer music. She then took advanced courses at the Acanthes Center with Luigi Nono and then with Elliott Carter. In 1992, she joined the IRCAM as part of the composition and computer music curriculum.

She then received numerous commissions, including from the IRCAM, Radio France, the Ensemble 2e2m and the Groupe de recherches musicales, the Festival Manca, the Festival Why Note and the Ensemble l'Itinéraire whose artistic director and composer Michael Levinas actively supported her work. She was appointed composer in residence at the M.I.A. and the Conservatoire d'Annecy from 2003 to 2005, then in 2005 in Dijon with the Ensemble L'Itinéraire and in 2006 at the Grame in Lyon. In 2007, she was appointed composer in research at the Ircam, an institute for which she wrote a string quartet and device, created in 2008 by the Danel Quartet.

One of the guiding principles of her work is the critical integration of a natively instrumental vocabulary into her writing. The continuation of her research at Ircam leads her to work in the field of mixed music, which combines the soloist with the electroacoustic device in a particular interactive relationship linked to the instrumental gesture and which seeks to highlight the phenomena of interpretation on which sound transformations will depend.

Her works are published at éditions Jobert.

== Works ==
Vocal music and instruments

- Alma Luvia / for female voices, trio and electronics (1993–1992), 7 min
- Femmes 2nd version / for 2 female voices and quintet (1998–2001), 25 min
- Femmes first version / for 2 female voices and 10 instruments (1998), 25 min
- Filastrocca / for tenor, bass, instrumental and electronic ensemble (2002), 15 min
- Piranhas video-opera / for 2 voices, saxophone quartet, ensemble and electronics (2004), 40 min
- Spira manes / for 7 voices, 7 instruments, and electroacoustic device in real time (1995), 21 min
- Terra Nova / for choir and orchestra (2000), 20 min

A cappella vocal music

- Beréchit / for bass voice, also baritone and real-time electroacoustic device (2006), 10 min

Soloist music (except voice)

- BogenLied / for augmented violin and real-time electroacoustic device (2005), 12 min
- Electrics / for solo instrument with real-time electroacoustics, (2004–2005), 9 min

Instrumental ensemble music

- Aïponis / for ensemble (1997), 13 min
- Bobok / for ensemble and electroacoustic device (2003), 13 min
- Laps / for orchestra (1996)
- Oyat / for harmony orchestra (2000), 7 min
- Sinopia / for eleven instruments (1993)

Chamber music

- Etruria / trio for clarinet, viola and crystal (1991), 3 min
- Etruria II 2nd version / for clarinet, viola, and vibraphone (1994), 3 min
- Etruria III version for quintet (2001), 9 min
- Mai-Mia / trio for piano, marimba, Baschet crystal and electroacoustics (1990)
- Nuraghe / 4 keyboards and string trio with real-time electroacoustic device (1991), 10 min
- Quintette Aligoté / for quintet and real-time electronics (2005), 14 min
- StreicherKreis / for "augmented" string quartet and electroacoustic device, live (2007–2008), 25 min
- Trinacria / Trio for trombone, viola and guitar (2002), 10 min

== Extracts ==
- About StreicherKreis, introduction to the work: Interview of J.P Derrien, (France Musiques Le Bel Aujourd'hui)
- About Piranhas, introduction to the work, Interview of Daniele Cohen-Lévinas
