= Leo Hussain =

British conductor (born 1978)

- Born: 1978 (age 47–48)
- Education: St John's College, Cambridge; Royal Academy of Music
- Occupation: Conductor

Leo Hussain (born 1978) is a British conductor, known for his wide-ranging repertoire and insightful programming. Following tenures as music director of the Opéra de Rouen and the Salzburger Landestheater, he has worked freelance conducting major orchestras and opera houses in Europe, and is Principal Guest Conductor of the George Enescu Philharmonic. His opera performances have included Bizet's Carmen at the Bavarian State Opera, Korngold's Die tote Stadt at the Théâtre du Capitole, and Weinberg's Die Passagierin at the Oper Frankfurt. He has also conducted outside Europe, for example Capriccio by Richard Strauss at the Santa Fe Opera, as well as concerts in Japan, Australia, New Zealand and the USA.

== Life and career ==
Born in 1978, Leo Hussain studied at St John's College, Cambridge, and the Royal Academy of Music. He served as an assistant to Simon Rattle at the Salzburg Festival, working with the Berlin Philharmonic which won him international recognition. He was also inspired by Daniel Barenboim and Yannick Nézet-Séguin.

Hussain was music director of the Salzburger Landestheater from 2009 to the 2013/14 season. He was offered the conductorship of the Opéra de Rouen in 2014. He made his Royal Opera House debut in the 2015/16 season, conducting Enescu’s Oedipe, and returned in 2019 to conduct Mozart's Die Zauberflöte.

Hussain conducted Tchaikovsky's Eugen Onegin at the Bavarian State Opera, Bizet's Carmen at the Royal Danish Theatre and Korngold's Die tote Stadt at the Théâtre du Capitole in Toulouse. In the United States, he has led Puccini's Tosca at the San Francisco Opera and Capriccio by Richard Strauss at the Santa Fe Opera. Productions at the Oper Frankfurt have included the double bill of Ravel's L'heure espagnole and de Falla's La vida breve, as well as Weinberg's Die Passagierin in 2015. A reviewer of Weinberg's opera – concerning a concentration-camp survivor and her former female guard – noted that Hussain excelled in realising numerous aspects of the score, including chamber music moments, hard cutting beats in the percussion, and distorted parodies of entertainment music, in the tradition of Mahler and Shostakovich. Hussain returned in the 2021/22 season for Cimarosa's L'Italiana in Londra.

Hussain conducted Britten's The Rape of Lucretia at the Glyndebourne Festival, and Alban Berg's Wozzeck and Schönberg's Gurrelieder for the George Enescu Festival.

In concert, Hussain has conducted the Mozarteum Orchester at the Salzburg Festival, Vienna Radio Symphony, Bamberg Symphony Orchestra, Deutsches Symphonie-Orchester Berlin and Orchestre Philharmonique du Luxembourg in Europe, the West Australian Symphony Orchestra and the Tasmanian Symphony Orchestra in Australia, the Auckland Philharmonia Orchestra in New Zealand, the NHK Symphony Orchestra and the Tokyo Metropolitan Symphony Orchestra at the Tokyo Spring Festival, and the Pacific Symphony and the Oregon Symphony Orchestra in the United States.
