= Gaston Litaize =

French organist and composer (1909–1991)

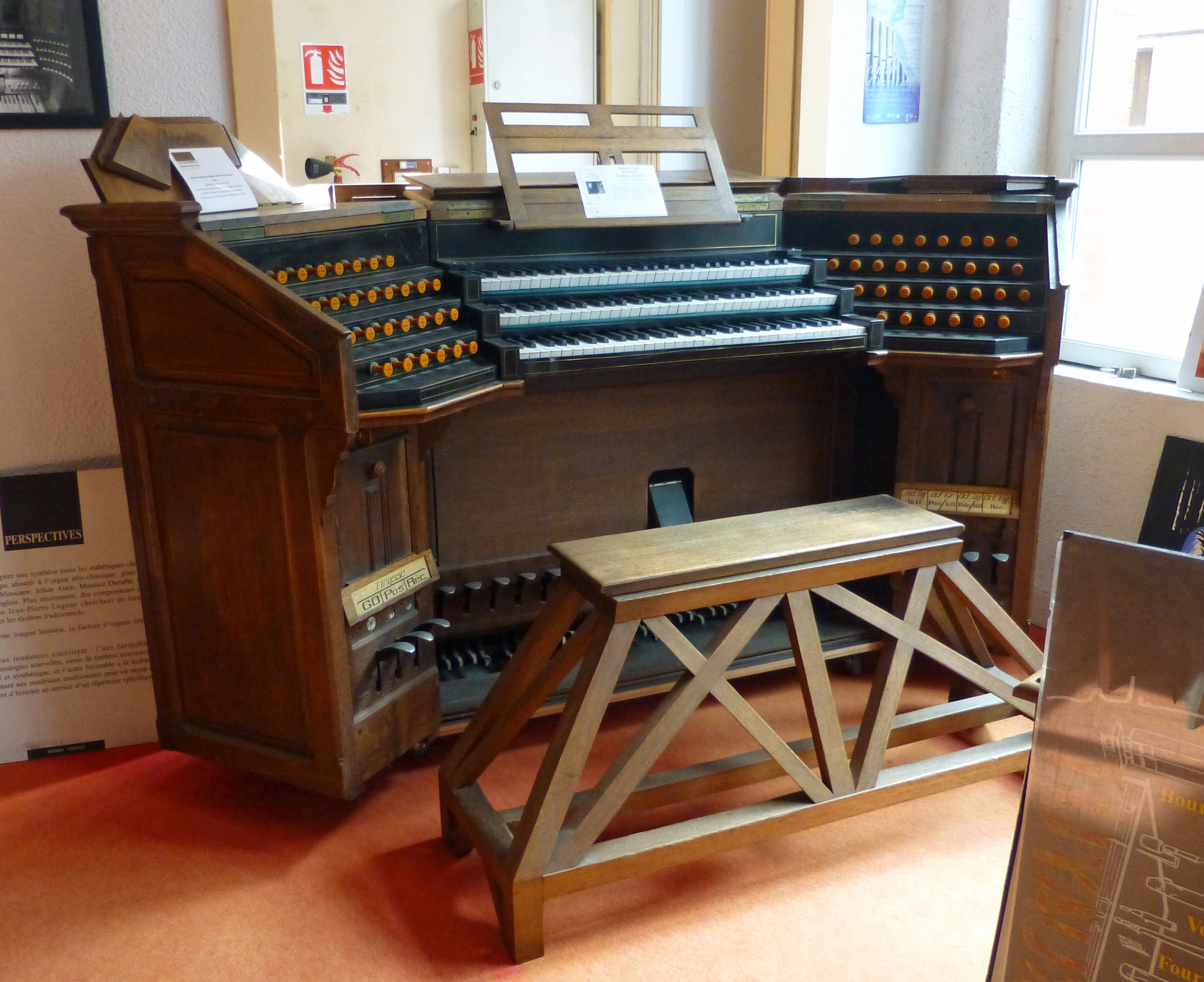
Former console of the Saint-François-Xavier church on which Gaston Litaize used to play

Gaston Gilbert Litaize (11 August 1909 – 5 August 1991) was a French organist and composer. Considered one of the 20th century masters of the French organ, he toured, recorded, worked at churches, and taught students in and around Paris. Blind from infancy, he studied and taught for most of his life at the Institut National des Jeunes Aveugles (National Institute for the Blind).

== Life ==
Litaize was born in Ménil-sur-Belvitte, Vosges, in northeast France. An illness caused him to lose his sight just after birth. He entered the Institute for the Blind at a young age, studying with Charles Magin, who encouraged him to move to Paris and study with Magin and Adolphe Marty at the Institut National des Jeunes Aveugles from 1926 to 1931. Concurrently, he entered the Conservatoire de Paris in October 1927, studying with Marcel Dupré and Henri Büsser, as well as privately with Louis Vierne. Over the course of six years, he won first prizes in organ, improvisation, fugue, and composition, as well as the Prix Rossini for his cantata Fra Angelico. In 1938 he finished second to Henri Dutilleux in the Prix de Rome, said to be the first time that a blind person was accepted in the competition; subsequently he asked Dutilleux many times to compose for the organ, but nothing came of it.

He began working as organist at Saint-Cloud in 1934, and after leaving the Paris Conservatoire in 1939 he returned to the Institut National des Jeunes Aveugles to teach harmony. In 1944 he began a thirty-year directorship of religious radio programs, where he oversaw five weekly broadcasts. He took up a position in 1946 at Saint-François-Xavier, Paris, where he remained the organist until his death. In 1975 he retired from the radio and began teaching organ at the conservatory in Saint-Maur-des-Fossés, where he "gained numerous disciples". He died in 1991 in Bruyères, Vosges.

As a performer, Litaize toured France, western Europe, the United States, and Canada. His first American tour was in the autumn of 1957. His recording of the Messe pour les paroisses by François Couperin on the organ at Saint-Merri earned highly positive reviews, called "admirably recorded" in The Musical Times and a "fine, sensitive performance" in Music & Letters. Unusually, he elected not to use notes inégales in the performance, although he was very interested in researching "old" music. His improvisations were called "shattering displays" and compared favorably to Dupré, Jeanne Demessieux, Pierre Cochereau, and Anton Heiller.

Litaize was highly influential on generations of French organists. He inspired Olivier Latry to choose his career:

At 16 I won piano first prize ... and I thought I might continue piano studies at the Paris Conservatoire. ... However, I decided to play the organ, choosing Gaston Litaize at the CNR de St-Maur-des-Fossés as my teacher as I had heard him give a very exciting recital at the Cathedral of Boulogne-sur-Mer. It was this that confirmed my desire to play the organ.

He also taught organ to several notable organists, including Antoine Bouchard, Theo Brandmüller, Olivier Latry, Françoise Levechin-Gangloff, Kenneth Gilbert, Jean-Pierre Leguay, and René Saorgin.

== Works ==
Norbert Dufourcq summarized Litaize's compositional style: "Litaize inclines ... to restlessness and gloom, but his idiom is virile and glowing. He is a fine melodist and skilful polyphonist." A review of Litaize's Douze pièces in The Musical Times was generally negative, however, finding the music dry and calling Litaize a "virtuoso writing for virtuosos". Archibald Farmer wrote that the Préludes liturgiques were "clever, interesting, often good, and always modishly French".

Litaize was involved with experimental music; soon after the inception of musique concrète he was asked to write a piece for African xylophone, four bells, three zanzas, and two whirligigs, which Pierre Schaeffer fragmented and reformed into Étude aux tourniquets in 1948–49.

== List of compositions ==
=== Organ ===
- Douze pièces (1931–1937)
- Grand-Messe pour tous les temps (1948)
- Noël basque (1949)
- Cinq pièces liturgiques (1951)
- Passacaille sur le nom de Flor Peeters (1953)
- Vingt-quatre préludes liturgiques for organ without pedal (1953–1955)
- Fugue sur l'Introït Da pacem (1954)
- Thème varié sur le nom de Victor Gonzales (1957)
- Messe basse pour tous les temps (1959)
- Messe de la toussaint (1964)
- Prélude et danse fuguée (1964)
- Epiphanie (1984)
- Reges Tharsis – Méditation sur l'offertoire de l'Epiphanie (1984)
- Deux trios (1984):
  - Divertissement à trois
  - Pièce en trio
- Arches – Fantaisie (1987)
- Suite en forme de messe (1988)
- Offerte vobis pacem (1991)
- Diapason – Fantaisie sur le nom de Jehan Alain

=== Organ with instrument(s) ===
- Passacaille for organ and orchestra (1947)
- Cortège for brass and organ (1951)
- Pentecôte – Triptyque for two organs (1984):
  - Vigile
  - Nocturne
  - Séquence
- Diptyque for oboe and organ:
  - Andantino
  - Scherzo
- Triptyque for French horn and organ
- Sonate à deux for organ, four hands (1991)

=== Other works ===
- Récitatif et thème varié for clarinet and piano (1947)
- Missa solemnior for mixed vocal quartet and organ (1954)
- Missa Virgo gloriosa for soprano, tenor, bass, and organ (1959)
- Magnificat for mixed vocal sextet and organ (1967)
