= Françoise Levechin-Gangloff =

French musician

Françoise Levechin-Gangloff (born 1950) is a French classical organist, titular of the great organ of the Saint-Roch church in Paris, professor at the Conservatoire de Paris - CNSMDP and at the Schola cantorum - and President of the International Conservatory of Music in Paris - CIMP.

She studied Piano, Sight-reading, harpsichord, composition and Organ at the Conservatoire de Paris and musicology at the Sorbonne. She studied the Organ with Gaston Litaize and Rolande Falcinelli.
