= Laurence Equilbey =

French conductor

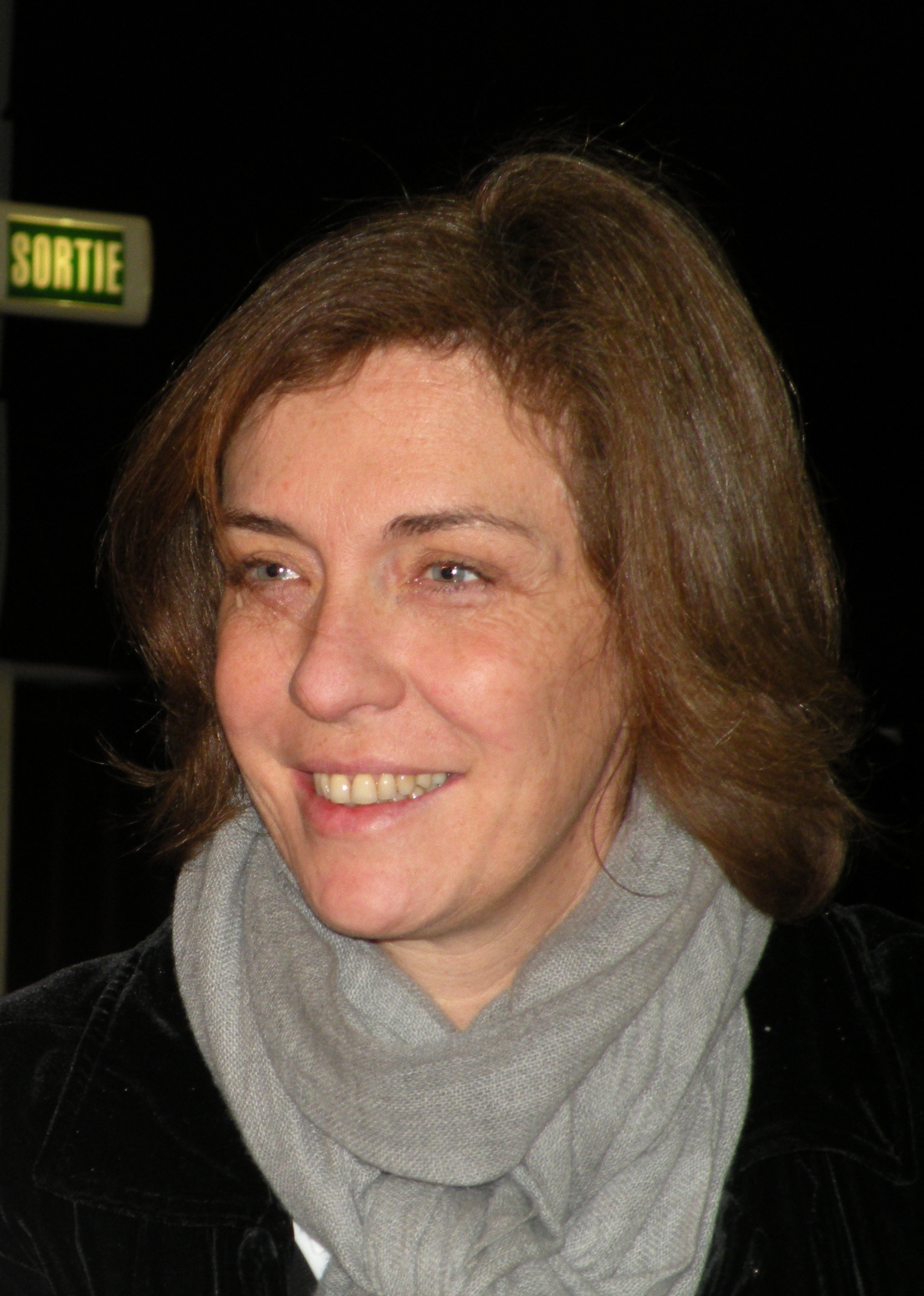

Background information
- Born: 6 March 1962 (age 64); France
- Occupation: Conductor
- Labels: Erato Records, Naïve Records
- Member of: Insula Orchestra, Accentus (founder, music director)

Laurence Equilbey (born 6 March 1962) is a French conductor, known for her work in the choral repertoire, and more recently as the founder and music director of the Insula Orchestra. She also founded the chamber choir Accentus in 1991, and has conducted commercial recordings for such labels as Naïve Records. Equilbey invented the "e-tuner", an electronic means of tuning quarter tones and 1/3 tones.

== Early life and education ==
Laurence Equilbey was born on March 6, 1962. Equilbey studied piano and flute in her early life.

She played piano and other instruments as a child, also singing. After studying musicology and writing music, she decided on conducting as a career path at age 18. In Vienna, she studied with Nikolaus Harnoncourt. She also studied in Paris, London and Scandinavia, studying with Claudio Abbado, Eric Ericson, Denise Ham, Colin Metters and Jorma Panula.

== Career ==
Equilbey founded the chamber choir Accentus in 1991, and continues as its music director. With Accentus, she has conducted commercial recordings for such labels as Naïve Records. In 1995, she founded the Jeune Chœur de Paris, which in 2002 was incorporated as a department of the Conservatoire à rayonnement régional de Paris. She co-directs the programme with Geoffroy Jourdain.

In 2008, Equilbey was made a Chevalier of the Legion of Honour. Since the 2009–2010 season, Equilbey has been an associate artist, with Accentus, of the Ensemble orchestral de Paris.

In 2012, she founded the Insula Orchestra. One of their goals is to perform the neglected works by historic women composers, such as Louise Farrenc. In July 2021, Erato Records released their recording of her conducting Farrenc's Symphony nos. 1 and 3.

She made her debut leading the National Symphony Orchestra in October 2023, at the Kennedy Center Concert Hall. She led both Insula and Accentus at the 2023 Hong Kong Arts Festival.

Equilbey invented the "e-tuner", an electronic means of tuning quarter tones and 1/3 tones. In 2023, Equilbey, Insula, and Accentus collaborated with artist Mat Collishaw on the multimedia piece "Sky Burial." Outside of conventional classical music, she is a collaborator in the Private Domain project, which has included work with Émilie Simon, Murcof, Para One, and Marc Collin of the band Nouvelle Vague.

== See also ==
- List of female classical conductors
