= Rouen Opera House =

Coordinates: 49.4395°N 1.0896°E

- Opera de Rouen Normandie; Théâtre des arts
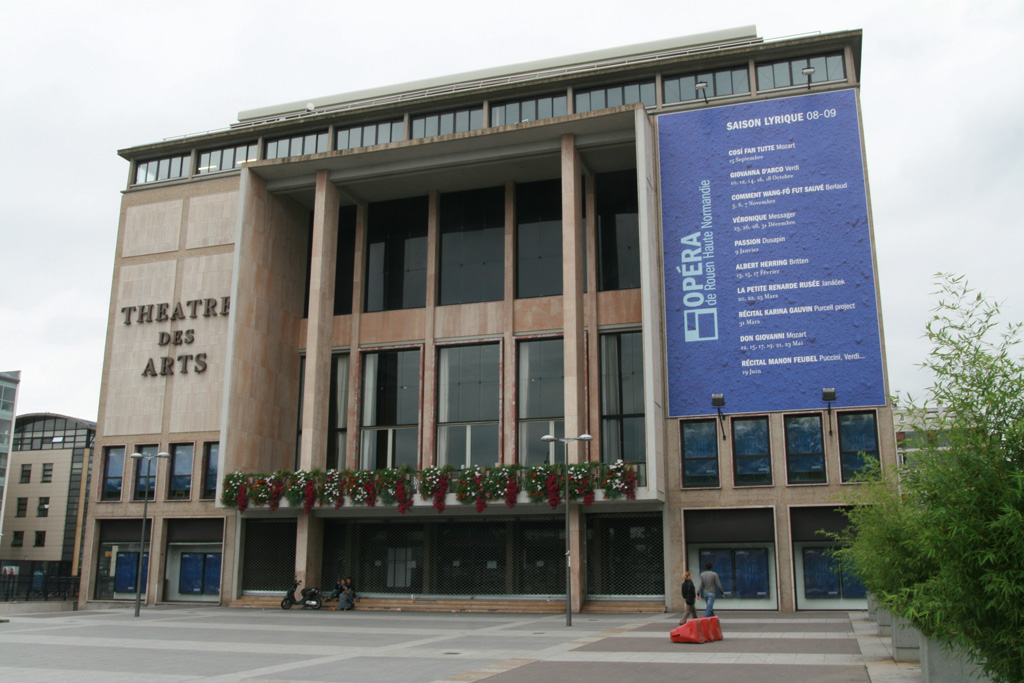
- The Opera House's main venue, the Théâtre des Arts
- Interactive map of the Rouen Opera House area

General information
- Type: Opera house
- Architectural style: Modern architecture
- Location: 7, rue du docteur Rambert, 76000 Rouen, Normandy (France)
- Construction started: 1952
- Completed: 1962
- Inaugurated: 11 December 1962

Design and construction
- Architects: Jean Maillard, Robert Levasseur and Pierre Sonrel (Théâtre des arts)

Other information
- Seating capacity: 1,350 (Théâtre des arts), 700 (Chapelle Corneille)

The Rouen Opera House, formally known as Rouen Normandy Opera House - Theatre of Arts (French: Opéra de Rouen Normandie - Théâtre des arts) is a French opera house located in Rouen, Normandy. It is home to the Rouen Philharmonic Orchestra.

It operates a portfolio of concert venues including its headquarters, known as the Théâtre des arts, and the Chapelle Corneille.

It is situated next to the Métro and TEOR station Théâtre des arts.

== Former halls ==
The first hall was built between 1774 and 1776 by François Guéroult. It was located near today's Grand-Pont and Charrettes Streets. The hall, known as the Théâtre des Arts, was inaugurated on 29 June 1776 with a performance of Corneille's tragicomedy Le Cid. Unfortunately, the entire building was gutted by fire on 25 April 1876.

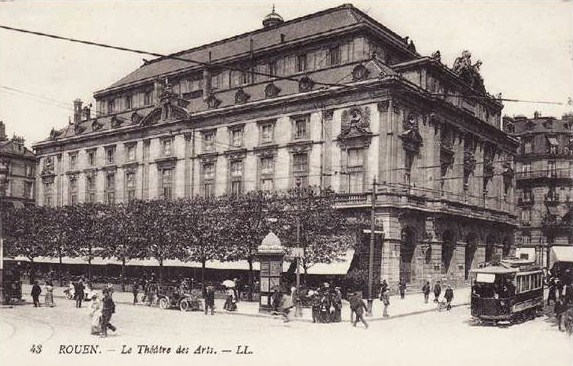
The former hall destroyed during WWII

The construction of a new theatre was commissioned and built according to the plans drawn by Louis Sauvageot. The new hall was constructed on exactly the same spot as the former and was inaugurated in 1882. In 1924 the theatre staged the world premiere of Luis Pacheco de Céspedes's La masque et la rose. In a twist of fate, the building was partially destroyed by fire when hit by shells on 9 June 1940. Performances were held throughout the war until the building was completely destroyed by allied bombing on 10 June 1944, shortly after singer Cécile Sorel left the stage.

== Current Hall ==
The city of Rouen decided to demolish the remnant parts of the building and commissioned the construction of a new one at the bottom of the rue Jeanne d'Arc (Joan of Arc Street) on the right banks of the city. The construction of the new Théâtre des Arts had to wait the ratification of the convention on war damages. Construction began in 1952 according to the plan designed by Jean Maillard and Robert Levasseur, in association with scenographer Pierre Sonrel and Lanfry's family-run construction business. In 1954 the construction was interrupted due to a reduction in fundings. The work started again in 1958. The original plan was reworked to meet the new requirements: the plan for a large hall with a capacity of 500 people to be constructed over the foyer was scrapped.

After ten years of work, the hall was eventually inaugurated in the presence of Bernard Tissot, the then Mayor of Rouen and deputy mayor for Beaux-Arts, the doctor Rambert.

Since 1962 stands on the hall's Square a bronze statue of Pierre Corneille by David d'Angers. The statue was situated at the crossing between both spans of the pont Corneille and the exit towards the Île Lacroix. One of several of its kind in the city, it is one of the few, along with the statues of Napoleon and Jean-Baptiste de La Salle by Falguière, which has not been melted by the Nazis in order to reuse the metal. In fact, the block and tackle used for lifting the statue off its base yielded, and the statue fell in the shallow water of the river Seine near the edge of the bridge. Then the Nazis began sawing the statue to get it out of the river before reassembling it. Luckily, the truck hired to carry the statue stopped working. The war over, the statue was saved.

In 2012 the Rouen Philharmonic Orchestra celebrated the fiftieth anniversary of the inauguration of the hall. As part of the celebrations, the Rouen Opera House asked people in possession of any kind of documents related to the building, such as photographs or films, to be allowed to make copies.
