= International Besançon Competition for Young Conductors =

Music competition, since 1951

The International Besançon Competition for Young Conductors, is a music competition for young conductors in the city of Besançon, France.

== History ==
The competition was organized for the first time in 1951 by the music and film critic and composer Émile Vuillermoz, as part of the Besançon International Music Festival, founded three years before. Many conductors who won the competition have established successful international careers, including Seiji Ozawa, Ali Rahbari, Jesús López-Cobos, Osmo Vänskä, and Sylvain Cambreling.

The first prize consists of a cash prize and engagements with important orchestras such as the BBC Symphony Orchestra, Ensemble orchestral contemporain, Dresden Philharmonic and Opera North Sinfonia.

== Winners ==
The winners of the competition are:

- 1951 Reinhard Peters
- 1952 Jean Périsson
- 1953 Peter Traunfellner
- 1954 Peter Chaille
- 1955 Jerzy Katlewicz
- 1956 Zdeněk Košler, first mention Sergiu Comissiona
- 1957 Jean Lapierre
- 1958 Martin Turnovsky
- 1959 Seiji Ozawa
- 1960 Poul Jorgensen
- 1961 Pierre Hetu
- 1962 Vladimir Kojoukharov
- 1963 Aloïs Springer
- 1964 Emil Simon
- 1965 Zdeněk Mácal
- 1966 no first prize awarded
- 1967 Yuval Zaliouk, junior section Luis Antonio García Navarro
- 1968 Jesús López-Cobos and Philippe Bender
- 1969 no first prize awarded
- 1970 Stéphane Cardon
- 1971 no first prize awarded
- 1972 Jacques Mercier (conductor)
- 1973 no first prize awarded
- 1974 Alex Veelo, 2nd prize Sylvain Cambreling
- 1975 Marc Soustrot
- 1976 Patrick Juzeau
- 1977 Tomas Koutnik and Ali Rahbari
- 1978 Yoel Levi
- 1979 Doron Salomon
- 1980 Jonathan Seers
- 1981 Philippe Cambreling
- 1982 Yôko Matsuo and Osmo Vänskä
- 1983 Michael Zilm, mention for Carlo Rizzi
- 1984 Wolfgang Doerner
- 1985 Wing-Sie Yip, 2nd prize Rodolfo Saglimbeni.
- 1986 Gilles Auger
- 1987 Nicolás Pasquet
- 1988 Lü Shao-chia
- 1989 Christopher Gayford and Yutaka Sado
- 1990 Ryusuke Numajiri
- 1991 George Pehlivanian
- 1992 Tommaso Placidi
- 1993 Silvia Massarelli and Daisuke Soga
- 1995 Tetsuro Ban
- 1994 Lü Shao-chia
- 1997 Marco Parisotto
- 1999 Alvaro Albiach-Fernandez
- 2001 Tatsuya Shimono
- 2003 no first prize awarded
- 2005 Lionel Bringuier
- 2007 Darrell Ang
- 2009 Kazuki Yamada
- 2011 Yuki Kakiuchi
- 2013 Yao-Yu Wu
- 2015 Jonathon Heyward
- 2017 Ben Glassberg
- 2019 Nodoka Okisawa
- 2021 no first prize awarded
- 2023 Swann Van Rechem
- 2025 Satoshi Yoneda
