= Hubert Soudant =

Dutch conductor (born 1946)

Hubert Soudant (born 16 March 1946 in Maastricht, Netherlands) is a Dutch conductor.

== Biography ==
Soudant played the French horn as a youth. He has won prizes in several conducting competitions, including the Besançon Young Conductor Competition and the Karajan International Conducting Competition.

Soudant has held music directorships with the Radio France Nouvelle Orchestre Philharmonique (1981–1983), the Utrecht Symphony Orchestra (1983–1986), the Orchestra Toscanini (1988–1992), the Orchestre National des Pays de la Loire (1994–2004) and Mozarteum Orchestra of Salzburg (1994–2004). He has also served as the principal guest conductor of the Melbourne Symphony Orchestra. He became principal guest conductor of the Tokyo Symphony Orchestra in October 1999, and its music director in September 2004. He stood down as music director of the Tokyo Symphony Orchestra in 2014.

Cultural offices
Preceded by Marc Soustrot	Music Director, Orchestre National des Pays de la Loire; 1994–2004	Succeeded by Isaac Karabtchevsky
Preceded by Hans Graf	Music Director, Mozarteum Orchestra of Salzburg; 1994–2004	Succeeded by Ivor Bolton
Preceded by Kazuyoshi Akiyama	Music Director, Tokyo Symphony Orchestra; 2004–2014	Succeeded by Jonathan Nott
