= Rachel Kolly =

Swiss violinist (born 1981)

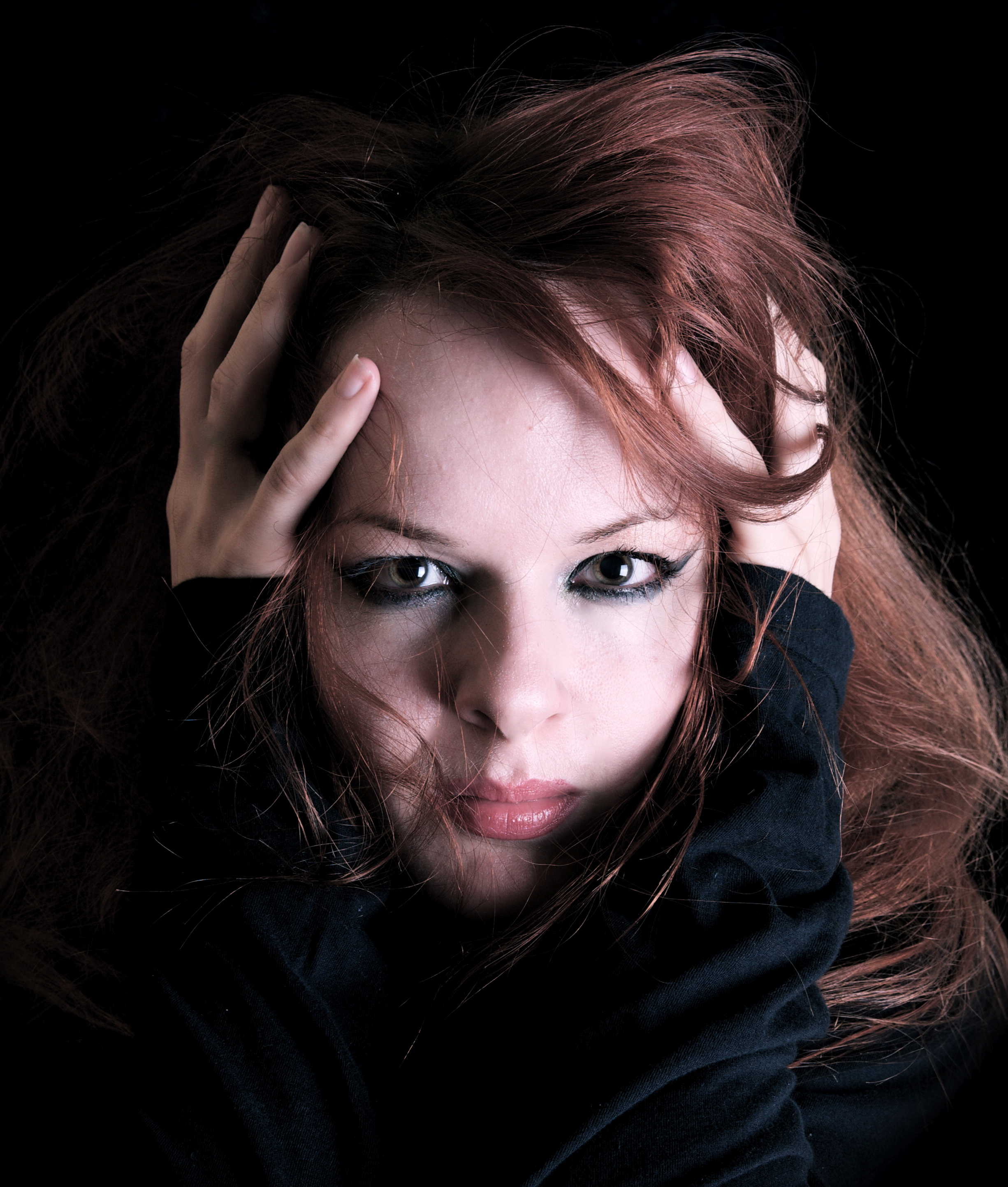
- Rachel Kolly

Background information
- Born: Rachel Elise Marie-Claude Kolly; 21 May 1981 (age 45)
- Origin: Lausanne, Switzerland
- Genres: Classical
- Occupation: Violinist
- Instrument: 1732 Stradivari
- Years active: 1997–present
- Label: Warner Classics
- Website: rachelkolly.com

Rachel Kolly (formerly performing as Rachel Kolly d'Alba), born 21 May 1981 in Lausanne, Switzerland, is a Swiss violinist. Considered a child prodigy at the violin, she started playing at the age of five.

== Early life ==
Kolly took her first violin and piano lessons at the age of five. She studied at the Lausanne Conservatory where she received, at the age of 15, her diplomas for teaching the violin and for chamber music. She continued her studies at the University for Music and Drama in Berne in the class of the Slovenian violinist and teacher Igor Ozim. In addition to her violin studies, she studied orchestration with Jean Balissat, composition with Michael Jarrell in Geneva and contemporary chamber music with Bruno Canino. She also took master classes with Franco Gulli (Bloomington), Thomas Kakuska (Alban Berg Quartett), Thomas Brandis, Hansheinz Schneeberger, and Ivry Gitlis.

== Career ==
Considered one of the most successful Swiss soloists and recognized internationally, Kolly made her debut as a soloist at the age of twelve. She has appeared recently as a soloist with orchestras such as the NHK Symphony Orchestra, the Orchestra Sinfonica di Milano Giuseppe Verdi, the Orchestre de Chambre de Lausanne, the BBC Philharmonic, the Bern Symphony Orchestra, the Orchestre National des Pays de la Loire, the RAI National Symphony Orchestra, the Real Orquesta Seville, the Berne Chamber Orchestra, the Jenaer Philharmonie, the Orchestra della Svizzera Italiana, the National Symphony Orchestra of Lithuania, the Bienne Chamber Orchestra, the Orchestre de Chambre de Toulouse, the WDR Symphony Orchestra Cologne, the hr-Sinfonieorchester (Frankfurt Radio Symphony Orchestra), the Biel Symphonic Orchestra, and the Orchestre de Chambre Fribourgeois, and has worked with conductors such as François-Xavier Roth, Pascal Rophé, John Axelrod, Dmitri Kitayenko, Daniel Kawka, Laurent Gendre, Kaspar Zehnder, Jean-Jacques Kantorow, Zsolt Nagy, Hervé Klopfenstein, and Marc Kissoczy among others.

Kolly is regularly invited to play at renowned festivals such as Menuhin Festival Gstaad, Festival de Divonne, Festival Violon sur le Sable in Royan, Festival Beethoven in Chicago, Internazionale Festival di Musica in Este, Contemporary Music Festival Yerevan, Festival Schleswig Holstein, Festival de Menton, Encuentros and Mozarteum at the Teatro Colón in Buenos Aires, the Chilean Sigall, International Festival of Flanders and Murten Classics.

Rachel Kolly plays a violin by Antonio Stradivari built in 1732.

Kolly has premiered many new works by such composers as Tristan Murail, Éric Gaudibert, Frederic Perreten, Valentin Villard, Fréderic Danel, Marco Attila, Katrin Frauchiger, Jonas Kocher, and Brice Catherin, among others.

In 2010 Kolly became the first Swiss musician to record for the Warner Music Group, signing worldwide with the major label Warner Classics. Her first CD with the label, Passion Ysaÿe, presenting the six violin sonatas by composer Eugène Ysaÿe, received unanimous praise in the international press. Her next release, as soloist with conductors Jean-Jacques Kantorow and John Axelrod, entitled French Impressions, features music for violin and orchestra by Saint-Saëns, Chausson, Ravel and Ysaÿe, and was released on the same label in October 2011. French Impressions won Best Recording of the Year in the Concerto category at the prestigious International Classical Music Awards (ICMA) 2012. Kolly won in a field of 215 nominees from classical music and recording reviews.

Rachel Kolly's third Warner Classics release, American Serenade, features works by American composers Gershwin, Bernstein and Waxman with the Orchestre National des Pays de la Loire conducted by Axelrod. Released worldwide in October 2012, it was rated five stars in the French magazine Diapason and in the BBC magazine, received the "Supersonic" award from the magazine Pizzicato, and was immediately nominated for the same ICMA award in 2013.

Season 2013/14 included concerts as a soloist with major orchestras around the world such as Rotterdam Philharmonic Orchestra, WDR Symphony Orchestra Cologne, hr-Sinfonieorchester (Frankfurt Radio Symphony Orchestra), and Bournemouth Symphony Orchestra. Kolly debuted at the Wigmore Hall in London in 2014. Her following recording, Fin de siècle, was released in February 2015, presenting works by Chausson and Franck.

In September 2017, Kolly was awarded the Music Prize of the Canton of Vaud (Switzerland). Lyrical Journey was released in September 2017 and presents works by Richard Strauss and Guillaume Lekeu. It was nominated for an ICMA Award as best CD of the year 2018 in the chamber music category, receiving a Supersonic Award and 5 stars in the French Diapason magazine.

== Chronology and awards ==
- 1992 - First prize at the final of the "Swiss Young Musicians" Competition in Zürich, Switzerland
- 1993 - Debut as a soloist with orchestra in Johan Svendsen's Romance Op. 26
- 1996 - Instrument Diploma from the Lausanne Conservatory
- 1997 - Teaching Diploma from the Lausanne Conservatory, Switzerland. Awarded Paderewski Prize for excellence in the diploma
- 2000 - 1st Prize Kiefer Hablitzel Competition, Switzerland
- 2001 - 1st Prize Friedl Wald Competition, Switzerland
- 2002 - "Solistendiplom", Diploma as a soloist at the Hochschule der Künste, Bern, Switzerland
- 2003 - Creation of the ensemble Paul Klee, a contemporary music ensemble at the Zentrum Paul Klee in Bern. Intense chamber music activity, and world premieres of works in collaboration with numerous composers. Awarded the cultural prize from the Fondation Leenaards
- 2004 - Debut in Argentina at the Teatro Colon
- 2005 - 1st Prize at the International Cardona Competition, Portugal, and Prize for the best interpretation of a contemporary music piece
- 2006 - Recording of first CD Recital - Musique Française (Fauré, Ravel, Debussy)
- 2009 - Signed with the major label Warner Classics in London
- 2010 - First CD for Warner Classics Passion Ysaÿe presenting the 6 solo Sonatas by Eugène Ysaÿe. Awarded 5 Diapasons, recommended by Strad Magazine UK and Strings Magazine US. Debut in New York
- 2011 - Release of French Impressions, second CD as a soloist with orchestra for Warner Classics. Supersonic Award - Best CD of the Year. London debut at Wigmore Hall. Received a 1732 Stradivari violin
- 2012 - ICMA - 2012 Winner - Best CD of the year in the concerto category for the CD French Impressions. Debut in Chicago. Debut in Italy as soloist with the Milan Symphony Orchestra in Karol Szymanowski's Concerto No. 1. Debut with the BBC Philharmonic in Max Bruch's "Concerto in G minor". Asian debut with the NHK SO in Tokyo in Maurice Ravel's "Tzigane" and Ernest Chausson's "Poëme". Release of third album American Serenade for violin and orchestra - Bernstein, Gershwin, Waxman, with John Axelrod, conductor. New nomination for an ICMA Award 2013 - 5 Diapasons - Recommendation Gramophone magazine - IRR - Classic FM - Supersonic Award - best CD of the year from Pizzicato magazine
- 2013 - First mission in Cambodia as an Ambassador for Handicap International. Spanish debut as a soloist with the Seville Royal Orchestra and debut with the WDR
- 2014 - Debut in the Netherlands with the Rotterdam Philharmonic in Johannes Brahms’ concerto. Debut with the BSO. Debut with HR Frankfurt Radio. Debut as a soloist in Finland (Concerto by Corigliano). Masterclasses in Paraguay for underprivileged children playing recycled instruments
- 2015 - Debut in Turkey as a soloist (Ankara). Debut in Chile as a Soloist (Santiago). Release of album Fin de siècle with the Swiss pianist Christian Chamorel and the Spektral Quartet of Chicago - Franck & Chausson. New nomination for CD Fin de siècle as best recording of the year 2016 in chamber music. Masterclasses in Paraguay for underprivileged children playing on recycled instruments. Humanitarian mission for children with AIDS (South America - Lapachos Association). Became honorary citizen of the city of Asunción (Paraguay) for her work with underpriviledged children, concerts, and masterclasses
- 2016 - Return as a soloist with the Royal Seville Orchestra in the concerto "1001 Nights in a harem" by Fazıl Say. Tour of Central America: Guatemala, Mexico, Costa Rica, Panama, Colombia, USA. Debut with the Nürnberg Symphony Orchestra and recording
- 2017 - Awarded the "Prix musique 2017" of the Canton of Vaud, Switzerland. Release of the CD Lyrical Journey featuring composers Guillaume Lekeu and Richard Strauss for Indésens with pianist Christian Chamorel. New nomination for an ICMA Award 2018 as best recording of the year in the chamber music category. 5 Diapasons - Supersonic Award
- 2018 - Appointed Music Director of a chamber music series in Switzerland
- 2020 - Release of the CD Bach - Partitas
- 2024 - Release of the CD Brahms - Sonatas with pianist Christian Chamorel.

== Personal life and other interests ==
Rachel Kolly lives in Porrentruy and Basel, Switzerland. Married to an Australian businessman, she has a daughter born in 2006. Her interests include writing, literature and travel.

A keen supporter of humanitarian causes, Kolly is an Ambassador for Handicap International. In March 2012, she traveled to Cambodia for her first mission. She is an honorary citizen of the city of Asunción (Paraguay) in recognition of her work with children with AIDS, her three consecutive seasons with the orchestra of the city of Asunción, and her masterclasses for the National Sonidos de la Tierra Program.

== Discography ==
- 2005 – Contemporary music from Switzerland and Armenia for violin and ensemble (including Vassena's violin concerto and compositions by Gaudibert, Frauchiger and others)
- 2006 – French recital for violin and piano (Debussy, Fauré, Ysaÿe, Lili Boulanger, Ravel) with Atena Carte, piano (released on Artlab)
- 2007 – Tournée Européenne (Concerto for violin and Choir by Nystedt, "Ave Maria") with the "Choeur des XVI" (released on Artlab)
- 2010 – Passion Ysaÿe, six solo sonatas by Eugène Ysaÿe (released on Warner Classics)
- 2011 – French Impressions, works for violin and orchestra by Ravel, Saint-Saëns, Chausson, Ysaÿe (released on Warner Classics)
- 2012 – American Serenade, works for violin and orchestra by Bernstein, Gershwin, Waxman, with John Axelrod (released on Warner Classics)
- 2015 – Fin de siècle, works by Franck (sonata) and Chausson (Concert) with pianist Christian Chamorel and Spektral Quartet (released on Aparté)
- 2017 – Lyrical Journey, works by Strauss (sonata) and Lekeu (sonata) with pianist Christian Chamorel (released on Indesens)
- 2020 – Bach Partitas (released on Indesens)
- 2024 – Brahms Sonatas (released on Indesens)
- 2026 – Ladies First, works by Amanda Maier (sonata), Pejačević (sonata), Bonis, Clara Schumann, Amy Beach, Lili Boulanger, Nadia Boulanger, Rebecca Clarke (released on Indesens) with pianist Pallavi Mahidhara (released on Indesens)
