= Pascal Rophé =

French conductor (born 1960)

- Born: 16 June 1960 (age 64); Paris
- Education: Conservatoire de Paris
- Occupation: Conductor
- Organizations: Orchestre national des Pays de la Loire Simfonijski orkestar Hrvatske radiotelevizije
- Awards: Besançon International Music Festival; Diapason d'Or

Pascal Rophé (born 16 June 1960) is a French conductor. He was the music director of the Orchestre national des Pays de la Loire. Currently he is the conductor of the Croatian Radio-Television Symphony Orchestra (Simfonijski orkestar Hrvatske radiotelevizije).

== Biography ==
Born in Paris, Rophé studied as early as 1974 at the Conservatoire de Paris, first studying the flute. He won second prize in a competition of young conductors at the Besançon International Music Festival in 1988.

From 1992, Rophé worked with Pierre Boulez and David Robertson within the ensemble intercontemporain. On 19 May 1998, Rophé conducted the premiere of Salvatore Sciarrino's opera Luci mie traditrici at the Schwetzingen Festival. His 2002 recording of Thierry Escaich's Concerto pour orgue with organist Olivier Latry won the Diapason d'Or de l'Année award. Also in 2002, he recorded Intrada by Éric Tanguy with the Orchestre national de France during the Festival "Présences 99" (2002). He conducted in 2005 the premiere of Michael Mantler's Concerto for Marimba and Vibraphone with the hr-Sinfonieorchester.

From 2006 to 2009, Rophé was musical director of the Orchestre Philharmonique de Liège. In 2011, he premiered Akhmatova, (based on the life of Russian poet Anna Akhmatova), Bruno Mantovani's last opera, at the Paris Opera. He conducted Phosphor, a concerto for percussion and orchestra by Johannes Schöllhorn, played by its dedicatee Pascal Pons, in October 2006 for the French premiere at the Musica Festival in Strasbourg and the Belgian premiere in Liège. They recorded in 2007 Tout un monde lointain... for cello and orchestra by Henri Dutilleux, with soloist Marc Coppey.

In September 2014, Rophé became music director of the Orchestre national des Pays de la Loire (ONPL). In 2016, for the centenary of Henri Dutilleux, he recorded with the ONPL works by Dutilleux, and also conducted the BBC's Total Immersion Day: the Magical Soundworld of Henri Dutilleux. Rophé was re-appointed as orchestra director in 2017 for an additional three years. Rophé is scheduled to stand down as music director of the ONPL at the close of the 2021-2022 season.

Rophé's other work in contemporary music has included the 10 March 2017 premiere with the Orchestre philharmonique de Radio France the second symphony Âme ("soul") by Philippe Schoeller, written on a commission by Radio France.

Preceded by Louis Langrée	Music director, Orchestre Philharmonique de Liège; 2006–2009	Succeeded by François-Xavier Roth
Preceded by John Axelrod	Music director, Orchestre national des Pays de la Loire; 2014–present	Succeeded by incumbent
