= Patrick Juzeau =

French classical violinist and conductor

Patrick Juzeau (1950–2004) was a French classical violinist and conductor.

== Biography ==
Born in Bordeaux in a musical family, Juzeau began his musical studies very early. He studied at the Conservatoire de Toulouse and in 1970 won the first prizes unanimously and with congratulations from the jury for violin and chamber music.

For three years he worked at the Théâtre du Capitole de Toulouse as a violinist and obtained the Certificate of Aptitude as a violin teacher in 1972, then was appointed to the Pau Conservatory. He worked conducting with Jean-Sébastien Bereau, Pierre Dervaux, Jésus Etcheverry and Roberto Benzi. In 1976, he won the Émile Vuillermoz prize of the 26th Besançon International Music Festival.

He then became Roberto Benzi's assistant at the Orchestre National Bordeaux Aquitaine before being appointed permanent head of the Orchestre national des Pays de la Loire. He was then musical director of the Orchestre National de France, of Bordeaux Aquitaine, Capitole de Toulouse and Provence Côte d'Azur. In 1983, he was appointed an academic at the Conservatoire national supérieur musique et danse de Lyon. He conducted regularly in Spain where after having been assistant director of the San Sebastian International conducting course, he was appointed musical advisor of the Euskadi National Orchestra.

He recorded the only complete French version of Benjamin Britten's The Little Sweep for the Lucien Adès and Le Petit Ménestrel labels.

Juzeau died in 2004 in Bordeaux.
