= Isaac Karabtchevsky =

Brazilian conductor (born 1934)

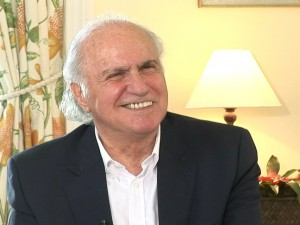
Isaac Karabtchevsky, 2010

Isaac Karabtchevsky (born December 27, 1934, in São Paulo) is a Brazilian conductor of Russian-Jewish ancestry. He studied music and conducting in Germany, where his teachers included Wolfgang Fortner, Pierre Boulez and Carl Ueter.

Karabtchevsky conducted the Brazilian Symphony Orchestra, (Rio de Janeiro) from 1969 to 1996. From 1988 to 1994, he was principal conductor of the Tonkünstler Orchestra, (Vienna). From 1995 to 2001, he was music director of the Teatro La Fenice (Venice). Since 2003, Karabtchevsky has been the artistic director of the Porto Alegre Symphony Orchestra (Porto Alegre). He was music director of the Orchestre National des Pays de la Loire (Nantes et Angers) from 2004 to 2009. Today, Karabtchevsky is the music director of the Petrobras Symphony, one of the leading orchestras in Brazil.

Preceded by Hubert Soudant	Music Director, Orchestre National des Pays de la Loire; 2004–2009	Succeeded by John Axelrod
Preceded by ?	Music Director, Teatro La Fenice; 1995–2001	Succeeded by ?
Preceded by Miltiades Caridis	Principal Conductor, Tonkünstler Orchestra; 1988–1994	Succeeded by Fabio Luisi
Preceded by Alceo Bocchino	Artistic Director, Orquestra Sinfônica Brasileira; 1969–1994	Succeeded by Roberto Tibiriçá
