= Pascal Pons =

French percussionist

Pascal Pons, born on 9 November 1968 in Nice, is a French percussionist.

== Biography ==
A specialist in contemporary repertoire, French percussionist Pascal Pons has worked in close collaboration with several composers. Dedicatee of “Phosphor”, a concerto for percussion and orchestra by Johannes Schöllhorn, he performed the world première in Basel and the German première in Freiburg in April 2006 with the Basel Sinfonieta under the direction of Cristóbal Halffter, and he reprised this work in October 2006 with the Orchestre Philharmonique de Liège conducted by Pascal Rophé for the French première at the Musica Festival in Strasbourg and the Belgian première in Liège.

Pascal Pons has also given the world première of Hans Ulrich Lehmann’s “Battements” with the Basel Radio Orchestra (1995), of “Yanda” (1995) by Antonio Gómez and “Trema I.II.III“ (1996) by Claus-Steffen Mahnkopf for solo multi-percussion, of Alan Hilario’s “Pakikisama” for solo percussion and 20 musicians with Stuttgart’s Musik der Jahrhunderte ensemble (1998), and of “Void II”, a triple concerto for saxophone, piano and percussion by Nikolaus Brass, with the Berlin Radio Orchestra under the direction of Roland Klüttig (2006), recorded on the Neos label.

He has given numerous recitals and chamber music concerts in Europe(France, Germany, Spain, Switzerland, Ukraine), the United States, South America (Brazil, Argentina, Chile, Uruguay) and Asia (Mongolia, Taiwan), including recent appearances at the first edition of the UpBeat Festival in Lugano, the June in Buffalo Festival, the Journées de la Percussion in Paris, the International Computer Music Conference (New Orleans), and in chamber music performances in Taipei and Versailles with celebrated percussionist Sylvio Gualda.

A member of the contemporary music ensemble SurPlus, led by James Avery, and a regular guest of Frankfurt’s Ensemble Modern and Vienna's Klangforum, Pascal Pons has performed in concert and on tour in distinguished halls and festivals – the Royal Albert Hall and the Barbican Centre in London, the Concertgebouw in Amsterdam, the Philharmonics of Berlin and Cologne, the Lincoln Center in New York City, the Konzerthaus in Vienna, the Taipei Concert Hall, the Cité de la Musique in Paris, the Salzburg Festival, the Perth Music Festival, the Munich Biennale, the Zurich Festival, the Wien Modern, the Maerz Musik in Berlin – under the baton of illustrious conductors such as Pierre Boulez, Peter Eötvös, Kent Nagano, Heinz Holliger, Ingo Metzmacher, Hans Zender, George Benjamin, Jonathan Nott, Sian Edwards, Oliver Knussen and Zoltán Kocsis.

He has played on radio broadcasts for Radio France, the BBC, the ORF, the RAI, the DRS in Switzerland, the WDR, HR and SWR in Germany, and his discography, composed of several premières, includes releases on BMG Classics, ECM, Wergo, RCA, Neos and Bridge.

Pascal Pons teaches marimba and vibraphone at the Hochschule für Musik Freiburg since 1996, he is Percussion Professor at the Conservatoire Neuchâtelois (Switzerland) since 2005, and will be a Professor at the Haute École de Musique (HEM) of the Geneva Conservatoire commencing in the autumn of 2008. He has given masterclasses at the Musikhochschule in Hanover, at the Institute for Contemporary Music of the Musikhochschule in Berlin, at the Conservatoire National de Région (CNR) in Versailles, in several universities in Taiwan (Taipei, Kaohsiung, Hualien, Tainan), and at the Odesa and Buenos Aires Conservatories. He was a jury member at the 2006 Taiwan International Marimba Competition.

A native of Nice, he first studied at the CNR in Nice with Rodolphe Palumbo, then with Sylvio Gualda at the CNR in Versailles where he obtained the Premier Prix, the Prix d’Honneur and the Prix de Perfectionnement. He completed his training at the Musikhochschule in Freiburg, studying with Bernhard Wulff and Robert Van Sice, receiving the Diploma of Advanced Studies and the Soloist Diploma.

Since 2006, Pascal Pons is an endorsee of Cadeson, an Asian manufacturer that has been combining excellence and innovation for 20 years. He will be a guest soloist at the Centre Acanthes in July, playing in recital at Metz’s Arsenal in a programme featuring works for solo percussion by Michèle Reverdy, Johannes Schöllhorn, Salvatore Sciarrino, and the première of “Showdown” by Alan Hilario.
