= Poul Jørgensen =

Poul Jørgensen may refer to:

- Poul Jørgensen (gymnast) (1892–1973), Danish gymnast
- Poul Jørgensen (conductor) (1934–2003), Danish conductor
- Poul Jørgensen (chemist) (born 1944), Danish chemist

== See also ==
- Paul Jorgensen (1935–2008), boxer from Louisiana
- Paul Lindemark Jørgensen (1916–1988), Danish Olympic sailor
