= Xie Jingxian =

- Also known as: Jane Xie
- Born: 解静娴; October 31, 1983 (age 43)
- Origin: Shanghai, China
- Genre: Classical
- Occupations: Pianist, Teacher, Competition organizer, Composer
- Instrument: Piano

Xie Jingxian (Chinese: 解静娴; pinyin: Xiè Jìngxián; born October 31, 1983) is a Chinese pianist from Shanghai. She is also known by her English name Jane Xie.

== Early years ==
Xie started to learn playing the piano at the age of four with Fu Jianmin, and won many prizes both home and abroad during her childhood. During the period of 1996-2002, she studied at the middle school affiliated to the Shanghai Conservatory of Music where she won many scholarships for musical excellence under the guidance of her professor, Zheng Shuxing, from the Shanghai conservatory of Music.

Despite her youth, at that time she was already invited to give several piano recitals all over China for solos and concertos with orchestras like Xiamen Philharmonic, among others.

== Education ==
With the clear intention of learning from the best, she moved to the cradle of classical music, Munich, and passed the entrance examination at the University of Music and Performing Arts (Hochschule fuer Musik und Theater).

From 2002 to 2008, she there attended the Masterclass of Professor Gitti Pirner, herself a student of the famous German's School master Wilhelm Kempff.

In 2006, she won the master's degree with distinction, which granted her a special admission to study the Meisterklasse, the highest music degree in Germany.

In 2008, at young age of 25, she obtained her Meisterklasse degree (equivalent to a Doctor degree) with distinction.

To complete her learning, Jingxian attended different Master Courses by Philippe Entremont, Leslie Howard, David Dubal, Lilya Zilberstein, Jerome Rose, Ilan Rogoff, Georg Sava and the Duo Tal & Groethyusen, among others.

During such intense studying years, she had the time to perform in several concerts as well as international competitions.

== Awards ==
Among other prizes, Jingxian Xie has been awarded with in the following competitions:

- First Prize of the 15th "Palma Ramón Llull" International Piano Competition in Palma de Mallorca, Spain, becoming its first Chinese winner ever (May 2008).
- Prize Winner at the 8th Munich International Piano Competition (June 2008).
- Prize Winner at the Stravinsky Piano Competition in USA.
- Prize Winner at the 2nd Seiler International Piano Competition in Kitzingen, Germany.
- Prize Winner at the "Felix Mendelssohn-Bartholdy Hochschule Klavierwettbewerb" in Berlin, Germany.
- Prize Winner at the "Munich International Piano Competition".
- Prize Winner at the Piano Competition for the Piano Students at the Shanghai Conservatory of Music.
- First Prize at the "Nie Er Cup".
- First Prize at the "Bai Ai Shen Cup".
- First Prize at the "Kang Tai Cup".

== Concerts ==
As a professional pianist, she has taken part as a soloist in many music festivals, such as:

- Munich Piano Festivals, Germany
- Munich Chamber music festivals, Germany
- Tegernsee Music Festivals, Germany
- Chopin Festival in Valldemossa, Mallorca, Spain
- Corpus a Palma, Mallorca, Spain
- Palau de Altea, Altea, Spain

Invited by conductors such as Philippe Bender, Muhai Tang or Yongji Wang, she has played in concertos and tours with several orchestras, such as:

- Xiamen Philharmonic, China
- Shanghai Philharmonic, China
- Baleares Island Symphony Orchestra, Spain

and performed together with other instruments and several Orchestras in Germany, Spain, France, Italy, Switzerland and China.

She also organizes her own concerts regularly, the last one of them at the He Luting Concert Hall, Shanghai, which was broadcast live on radio.

== Career ==
At present, Xie gives not only piano recitals, but also chamber music concerts, piano duo concerts as well as concerts with orchestras all over the world. Since 2009 she has become the youngest teacher of the middle school affiliated to the Shanghai Conservatory of Music, in which she teaches piano duo and chamber music. Another of her activities is to work at the organization of several piano competitions in Shanghai like the "China Shanghai International Youth Piano Competition", for which she performs as an invited artist too.

She has also been requested to compose credits melodies for TV programs.

== In the media ==
After her concert at the He Luting in 2009, several media praised her return to Shanghai.
