= Roberto Eyzaguirre =

Peruvian-American musician

Roberto Eyzaguirre (September 10, 1923 – October 19, 2004) was a Peruvian-American classical pianist and famed piano pedagogue. He was a longtime friend and pupil of the legendary 20th-century virtuoso pianist Claudio Arrau, who had studied under a pupil of Franz Liszt. He was noted for his colorful playing and "big tone."

== Biography ==
Eyzaguirre studied piano performance at the National Conservatory of Music in Lima, Peru before moving to New York City in his early twenties to study with Claudio Arrau. In New York, he met June Gallaher, who was studying opera at the Juilliard School of Music. They married in 1948.

With Arrau's assistance, Eyzaguirre made his Carnegie Hall debut in the 1960s, receiving favorable reviews from the New York music critics. Despite showing early signs of exceptional promise, Eyzaguirre's career was cut short due to ulcers. Unable to return to performing, he received a doctorate in musicology from the University of Miami and turned to teaching. He taught at School of the Holy Child, Sam Houston State University, and Houston Baptist University. His successful students included the acclaimed conductor John Axelrod.

Eyzaguirre was an esteemed pedagogue in the Houston area. He taught at Sam Houston State University in 1972–1973, and Houston Baptist University in 1973–1981 and perhaps beyond. He collaborated with accomplished accompanist Edith Orloff during the late 1970s. Eyzaguirre gained a loyal following from students at these Texas universities who sought his musical advice decades after. Eyzaguirre was also an accomplished recitalist in the Houston area. One memorable recital was a shared recital at Houston Baptist University where he performed the "Carnival" of Schumann, one of his favorite teaching works.

Eyzaguirre was also briefly mentioned in Beryl Singleton Bissell's The Scent of God: A Memoir.
