= Jonathon Heyward =

American conductor

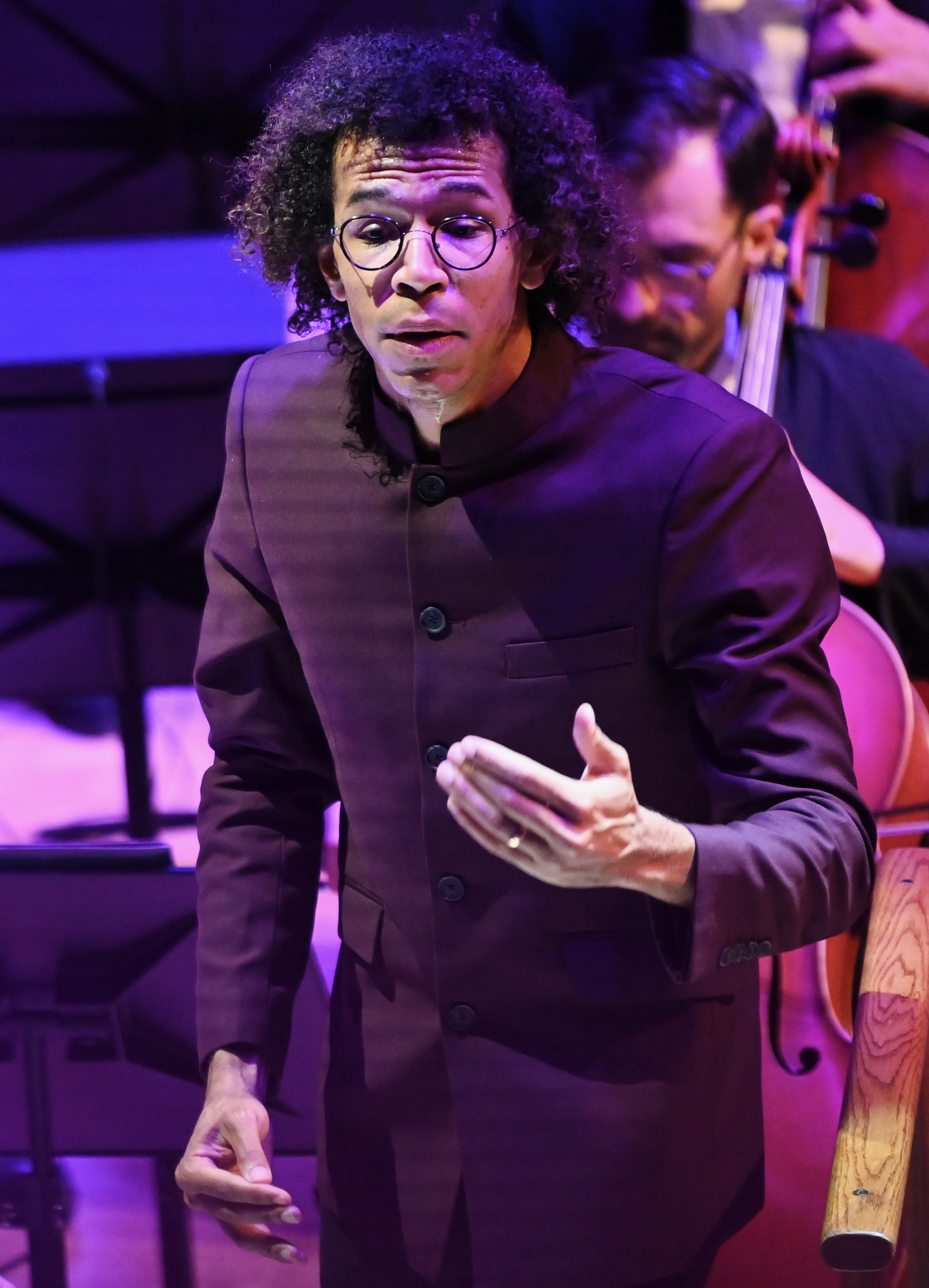
- Heyward at the Baltimore Symphony Orchestra on September 22, 2023
- Born: July 26, 1992 (age 34)
- Education: Boston Conservatory; Royal Academy of Music
- Occupation: Conductor
- Organizations: The Hallé; Nordwestdeutsche Philharmonie; Baltimore Symphony Orchestra
- Website: jonathonheyward.com

Jonathon Heyward (born July 26, 1992) is an American conductor and cellist. He is music director of the Baltimore Symphony Orchestra and music director of the Festival Orchestra of Lincoln Center. Born in Charleston, South Carolina, he studied at the Boston Conservatory and the Royal Academy of Music.

== Biography ==
Heyward was born in Charleston, South Carolina, in 1992. Heyward grew up in West Ashley, South Carolina, and had no exposure to classical music at home. His father had lived in Harlem, and his mother's parents were from Russia and Yugoslavia. He first trained as a cellist, studying with Timothy O'Malley, and playing chamber music. His first public conducting opportunity took place in 2009 as part of Chamber Music Charleston's Mozart In The South Festival Youth Orchestra.

Heyward studied conducting at the Boston Conservatory with Andrew Altenbach and then was assistant conductor for both the conservatory's opera department and the Boston Opera Collaborative, where he worked on productions of Puccini's La Bohème, Mozart's Die Zauberflöte and Britten's The Rape of Lucretia. He completed post-graduate studies at the Royal Academy of Music in London with Sian Edwards in 2016.

Heyward was assistant conductor at the Hampstead Garden Opera Company from 2013. He won the 2015 International Besançon Competition for Young Conductors. He became assistant conductor of The Hallé in 2016 and served as music director of The Hallé Youth Orchestra during that period. He first conducted at The Proms in August 2021.

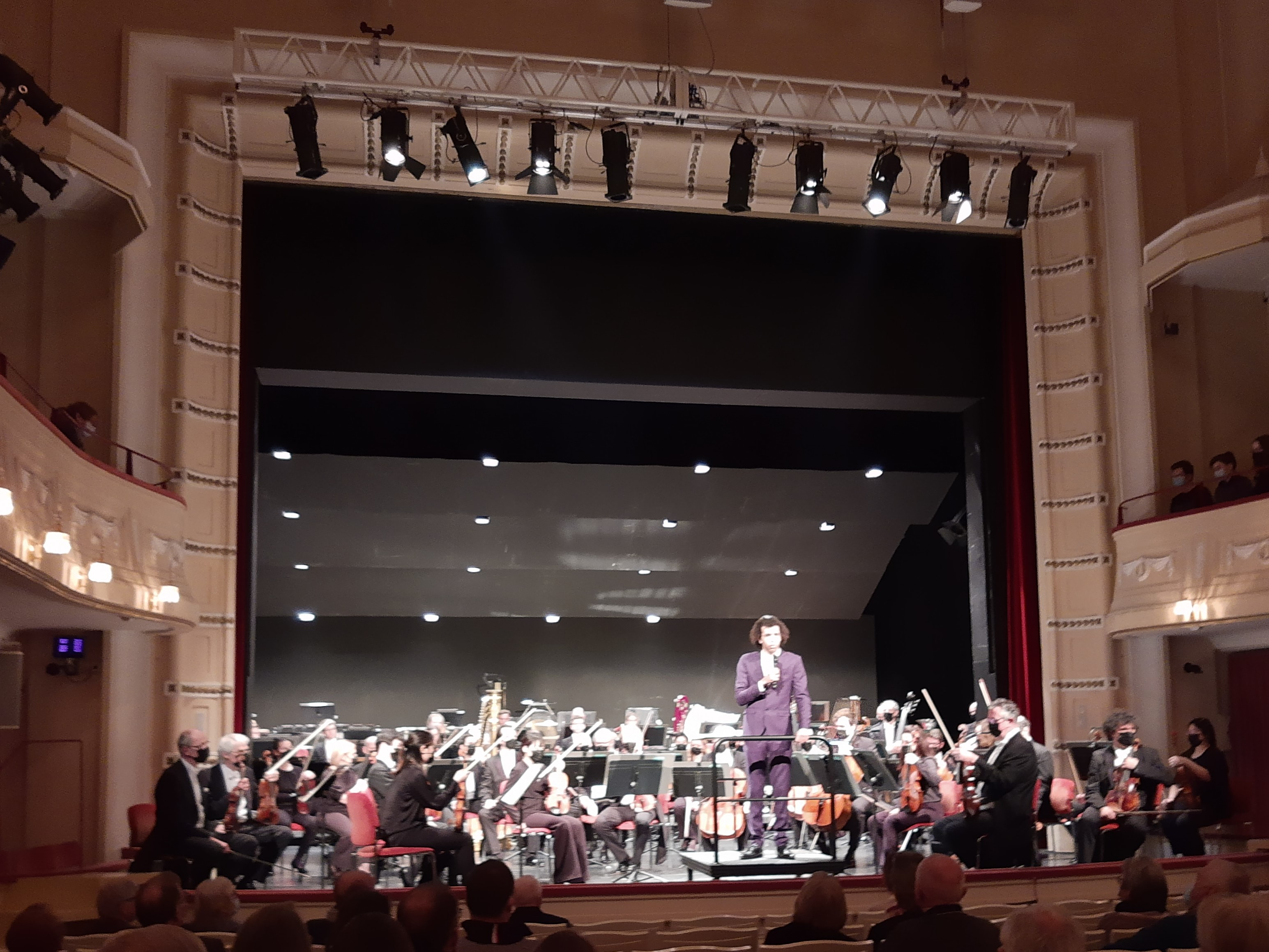
Heyward at Stadttheater Minden on March 3, 2022, announcing that the following concert was dedicated to the victims of the invasion of Ukraine.

Heyward became chief conductor of the Nordwestdeutsche Philharmonie in 2021. He concluded his tenure with the Nordwestdeutsche Philharmonie at the close of the 2023–2024 season.

In March 2022, Heyward first guest-conducted the Baltimore Symphony Orchestra. He returned as guest conductor in April 2022 for a charity concert for Ukraine. In July 2022, the orchestra announced the appointment of Heyward as its next music director, effective with the 2023/24 season, with an initial contract of five years. Heyward is the first conductor of color to be named music director of the Baltimore Symphony Orchestra. In October 2025, the orchestra announced the extension of Heyward's contract as its music director through the 2030–2031 season.

In May 2023, Lincoln Center for the Performing Arts announced the appointment of Heyward as the next music director of the orchestra formerly affiliated with the Mostly Mozart Festival, with the festival subsequently renamed as the "Summer for the City" festival and the orchestra renamed as the Festival Orchestra of Lincoln Center. In January 2025, Lincoln Center announced the extension of Heyward's contract with the Festival Orchestra of Lincoln Center through the summer 2029 season, with a change in his title to music director and artistic director of the orchestra, with immediate effect.

In October 2023, Time named Heyward to its list of Next Generation Leaders. Heyward and his British-born wife Millie Aylward have a daughter, born in 2024.

Cultural offices
Preceded by Yves Abel	Chief Conductor, Nordwestdeutsche Philharmonie; 2021–2024	Succeeded by Jonathan Bloxham
Preceded by Louis Langrée (Music Director, Mostly Mozart Festival Orchestra)	Music Director and Artistic Director, Festival Orchestra of Lincoln Center; 2023–2025 (Music Director), 2025–present (Music Director and Artistic Director)	Succeeded by incumbent
