= Nicolás Pasquet =

Uruguayan conductor and professor

Nicolás Pasquet (born 1958) is a conductor from Uruguay and professor of conducting.

== Biography ==
Born in 1958 in Montevideo, Uruguay, Pasquet studied violin and conducting at the National Music College. He later studied in Germany, violin at the Stuttgart College of Music and conducting in Nürnberg. Nicolas Pasquet's conducting career started after winning in two occasion the National Competition for Young Conductors (1984 and 1986) and the first prize of the International Besançon Competition for Young Conductors in 1987.

Nicolás Pasquet has been invited to conduct orchestras in Switzerland, Italy, Portugal, South America, United States, Australia, South-Korea, including the NDR Radiophilharmonie, Philharmoniker Hamburg, Orchestre national du Capitole de Toulouse, Queensland Orchestra and the Bavarian Radio Symphony Orchestra. Pasquet served as Chief Conductor at the Symphony Orchestra of Pécs Hungary (1993–1996), the Philharmonic Orchestra in Neubrandenburg and the orchestra of the Coburg Theatre.

He served as conducting teacher in Nuremberg before being appointed professor of conducting at the Hochschule für Musik "Franz Liszt" in Weimar, Germany. Pasquet is also chief conductor of the LJSO Hessen (Youth Orchester of Hessen, Germany).
