= Hollywood in Vienna =

Annual film music gala at the Vienna Concert Hall, Austria

Coordinates: 48°12′02″N 16°22′37″E

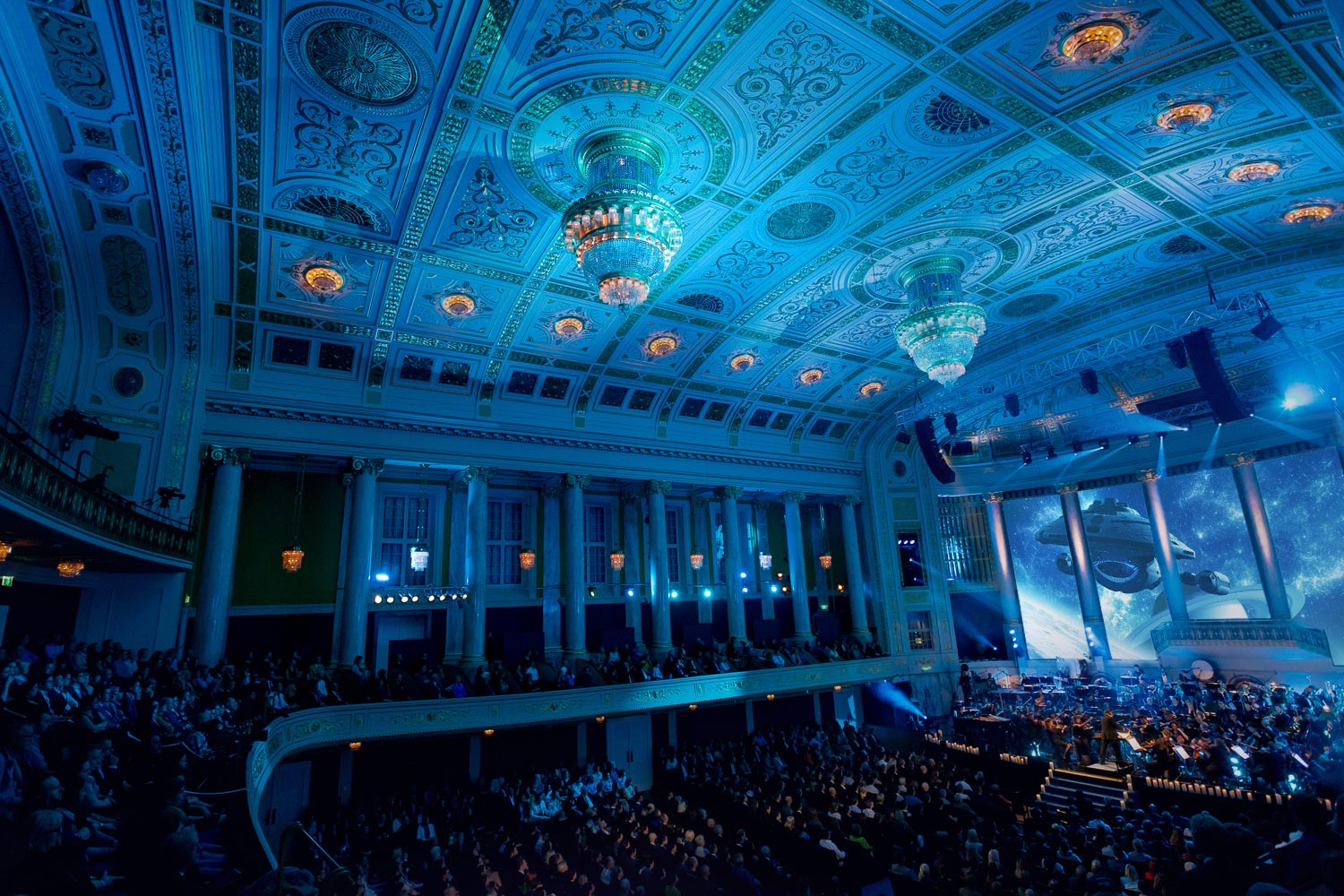
Hollywood in Vienna in Wiener Konzerthaus

Hollywood in Vienna is an annual film music gala hosted in the Vienna Concert Hall where the Max Steiner Film Music Achievement Award is presented.

== Overview ==
"Hollywood in Vienna" is a red carpet film music gala-concert in the Vienna Concert Hall, where the City of Vienna honours the most prestigious film composers of our time with the »Max Steiner Film Music Achievement Award«. The gala has established itself as one of the leading film music events world-wide and is broadcast via TV to 35 countries.

The gala concert was initiated in 2007 by Sandra Tomek, Tomek Productions, and has since then been produced by Tomek Productions and Echo Medienhaus and co-produced by Michael Balgavy. The gala also commemorates the composers who emigrated from Vienna in the 20th century to establish the classic Hollywood sound in Hollywood. The composers included Erich Wolfgang Korngold, Max Steiner, Arnold Schoenberg and others.

In recent years, world-famous film music composers such as Danny Elfman, Alexandre Desplat, Randy Newman, Hans Zimmer and, 2019 Gabriel Yared have been among the awardees.

In the course of the celebrations, the honored composers also hold lectures and workshops at the associated "International Film Music Symposium Vienna" (FIMU Vienna) in order to promote young musicians.

The concerts with star guest Alan Menken was originally planned for October 2020, had to be postponed to September 2022 due to the COVID-19 pandemic.

According to the organisers, no event will take place in 2023. Post-COVID19 inflation and the loss of two major partners made it economically impossible. While the organisers feel that they are unable to get the concert off the ground, they hope to the able to do more galas in the incoming years.

== Max Steiner Film Music Achievement Award ==
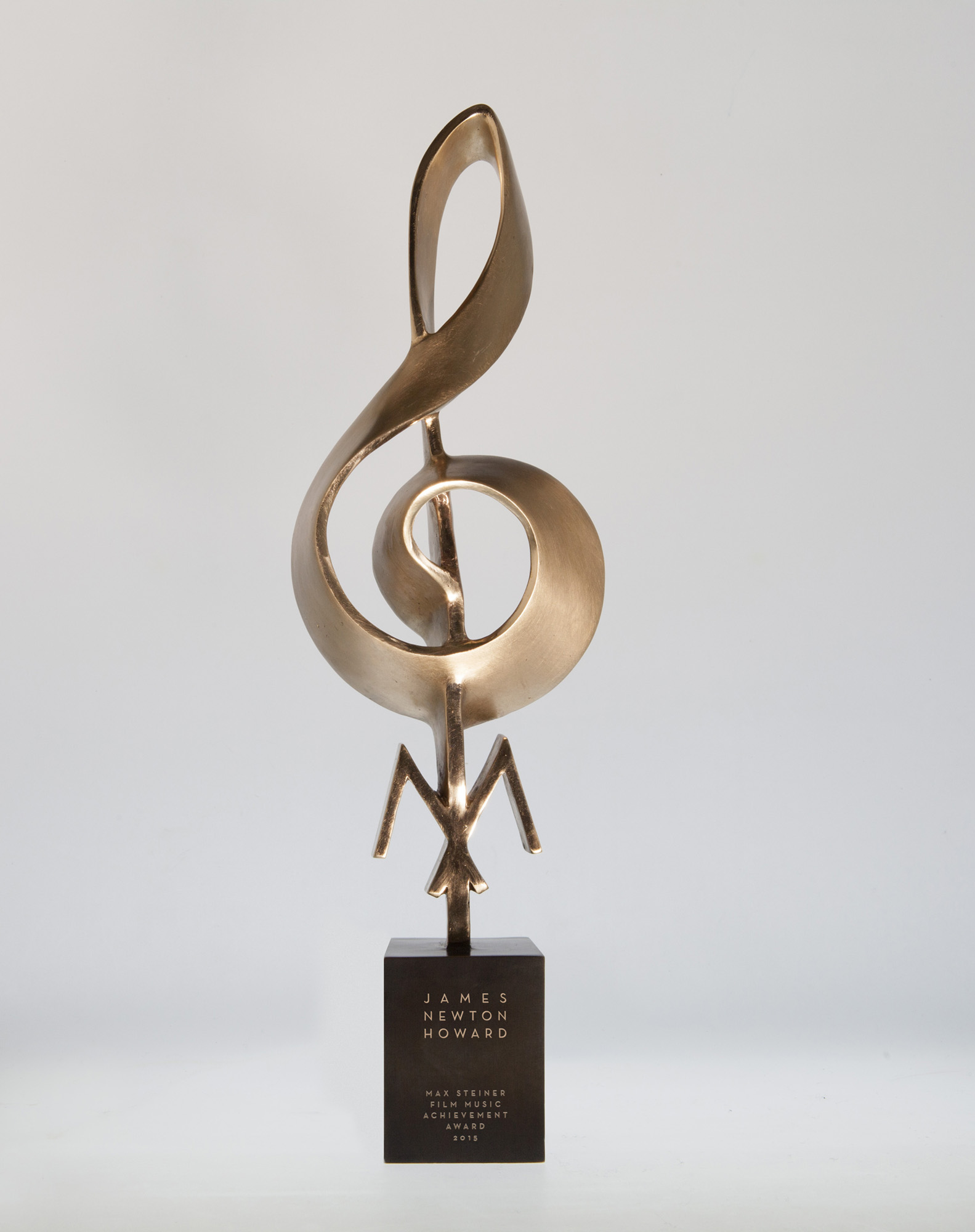
Max Steiner Film Music Achievement Award

The award is given as a symbol of recognition for exceptional achievements in the art of film music.

The Max Steiner Award commemorates the Viennese composer Max Steiner, who invented the essential techniques of film scoring back in the 1920s and wrote the first large orchestral soundtrack in film history for King Kong (1933). While working at RKO and Warner Brothers, Steiner composed more than 300 film scores including Gone with the Wind (1939) and Casablanca (1942). He also composed the Warner Bros Studio Fanfare. He was awarded with three Academy Awards and is considered as the "Father of Film Music" in Hollywood.

== Awardees ==
- 2009: John Barry
- 2010: Howard Shore
- 2011: Alan Silvestri
- 2012: Lalo Schifrin
- 2013: James Horner
- 2014: Randy Newman
- 2015: James Newton Howard
- 2016: Alexandre Desplat
- 2017: Danny Elfman
- 2018: Hans Zimmer
- 2019: Gabriel Yared
- 2022: Alan Menken

== Conductors ==
- 2007: John Mauceri
- 2009-2011: John Axelrod
- 2012-2014: David Newman
- 2015–2016: Keith Lockhart
- 2017: James Shearman & John Mauceri
- 2018: Martin Gellner
- 2019: Keith Lockhart
- 2022: Michael Kosarin

== Orchestra ==
Vienna Radio Symphony Orchestra (ORF Radio-Symphonieorchester Wien)

== Guests, Artists and Contributors ==
Keith Lockhart, John Mauceri, Marc Shaiman, Lisa Gerrard, David Newman, Judith Hill, Olga Scheps, Ramon Vargas, Yury Revich, Frantisek Janoska, Drew Sarich, Valentina Nafornita, Aleksey Igudesman, Lebo M, Louise Dearman, Steven Gätjen, Martin Haselböck, Staatsopernballet (wie immer man das schreibt), Wiener Sängerknaben, Bolschoi Don Kosaken, Richard Bellis, Daniela Fally, Emmanuel Tjeknavorian, Superar Kinderchor, Cassandra Steen, Adrian Eröd, Ildiko Raimondi, Deborah Cox, Jeremy Schonfeld, David Arnold, Al Jarreau, Lalo Schifrin, Natalia Ushakova, Bruce Broughton, David Arnold, Alan Silvestri, Howard Shore, Harald Kloser, Alexander Frey, Barbara Broccoli, John Mauceri, James Shearman, Kate Barry, Klaus Badelt, Nicholas Dodd, Rick Porras, Gedeon Burkhard, John Axelrod, Kevin Costner, John Barry, Patrick Doyle, John Powell, Robert Dornhelm, Rebekka Bakken, Juan Garcia-Herreros, Alastair King, Christian Kolonovits, among others.
