= Mostly Mozart Festival =

Former classical music festival in New York City

- Status: Active
- Genre: Classical music festival
- Begins: mid-July
- Ends: mid-August
- Frequency: Annually
- Venue: Lincoln Center for the Performing Arts and others
- Location: New York City
- Country: United States
- Years active: 60
- Inaugurated: August 1, 1966
- Founders: Jay K. Hoffman and William Lockwood
- Most recent: August 31, 2023
- Organiser: Lincoln Center for the Performing Arts
- Website: www.mostlymozart.org

The Mostly Mozart Festival was an American classical music festival based in New York City.

== Venues ==
The festival presented concerts with its resident ensemble, the Mostly Mozart Festival Orchestra, principally at David Geffen Hall of the Lincoln Center for the Performing Arts. Other festival concerts occurred at such venues as:

- Alice Tully Hall
- Stanley H. Kaplan Penthouse
- Rose Theater (Jazz at Lincoln Center)
- Merkin Concert Hall
- Gerald W. Lynch Theater
- David Rubenstein Atrium
- Walter Reade Theater

== History ==
Jay K. Hoffman, William W. Lockwood Jr., Schuyler G. Chapin and George F. Schutz jointly founded the initial version of the festival in 1966. The festival's first season occurred under the title 'Midsummer Serenades – A Mozart Festival', on August 1, 1966. As advised by the then-president of Lincoln Center, William Schuman, the festival assisted in providing summer employment for freelance classical musicians in New York City.

The Mostly Mozart Festival Orchestra, the resident orchestra of the festival, is a freelance orchestra with a roster of tenured players who return each season. It features musicians from diverse American orchestras, including the Cincinnati Symphony Orchestra, Metropolitan Opera Orchestra, New York City Ballet Orchestra, New York Philharmonic, Orpheus Chamber Orchestra, Pittsburgh Symphony Orchestra, St. Louis Symphony, and Saint Paul Chamber Orchestra, among others.

Gerard Schwarz became the festival's music director in 1984. During his tenure, visiting ensembles joined the festival roster, and the repertoire widened beyond Wolfgang Amadeus Mozart to other composers of the classical era, as well as neoclassical works from later eras. A chamber music series was initiated during that period. Schwarz concluded his music directorship of the festival in August 2001. In July 2002, last-minute industrial action just before the start of that summer's festival by the festival orchestra musicians led to the cancellation of 20 concerts, over a dispute regarding the authority of the festival's music director over personnel.

In December 2002, Louis Langrée was named the festival's next music director, and formally took up the post in the summer of 2003. In March 2005, his initial contract with Mostly Mozart was extended to 2008. His contract was further extended in April 2014 through 2017. In April 2017, the festival further extended Langrée's contract through 2020. Langrée concluded his tenure as music director of the Mostly Mozart Festival at the close of the summer of 2023.

Effective with the summer of 2023, Lincoln Center for the Performing Arts subsumed the Mostly Mozart Festival into its 'Summer for the City' festival. In May 2023, Lincoln Center announced the appointment of Jonathon Heyward as the next music director of the orchestra affiliated with the Mostly Mozart Festival, which was scheduled to undergo a name change from 2024 onwards. In January 2024, Lincoln Center announced the new name of the orchestra as the Festival Orchestra of Lincoln Center.

== Music directors ==
- Gerard Schwarz (1984–2001)
- Louis Langrée (2003–2023)
