= Yves Abel =

Canadian conductor

- Born: 1963 (age 62–63); Toronto, Ontario, Canada
- Education: Mannes College
- Occupation: Conductor
- Organizations: Opéra Français de New York; Nordwestdeutsche Philharmonie
- Website: www.yvesabel.com

Yves Abel (born 1963) is a Canadian conductor.

== Career ==
Abel was born in Toronto, Ontario, the son of French parents. He made his professional debut as a boy, singing solo in Mozart's The Magic Flute at the Canadian Opera Company. He studied piano and conducting at The New School for Music of the Mannes College in New York City.

In 1988, Abel founded the company Opéra Français de New York, which focuses on rarely played French operas. Also its musical director, he presented there the world premiere of Pascal Dusapin's To be sung. Abel was principal guest conductor of the Deutsche Oper Berlin from 2005 to 2011.

From 2015 to 2020, Abel was chief conductor of the Nordwestdeutsche Philharmonie. In 2020, he became principal conductor of San Diego Opera, with an initial contract of 3 years.

Abel and his family reside in Italy. In 2009, the French government appointed him Chevalier of the Ordre des Arts et des Lettres. In 2017, Abel received the Rubies Award from the Opera Canada, for his services to opera in Canada.

Cultural offices
Preceded by Eugene Tzigane	Chief Conductor, Nordwestdeutsche Philharmonie; 2015–2020	Succeeded by Jonathon Heyward
