= Louis Langrée =

French conductor (born 1961)

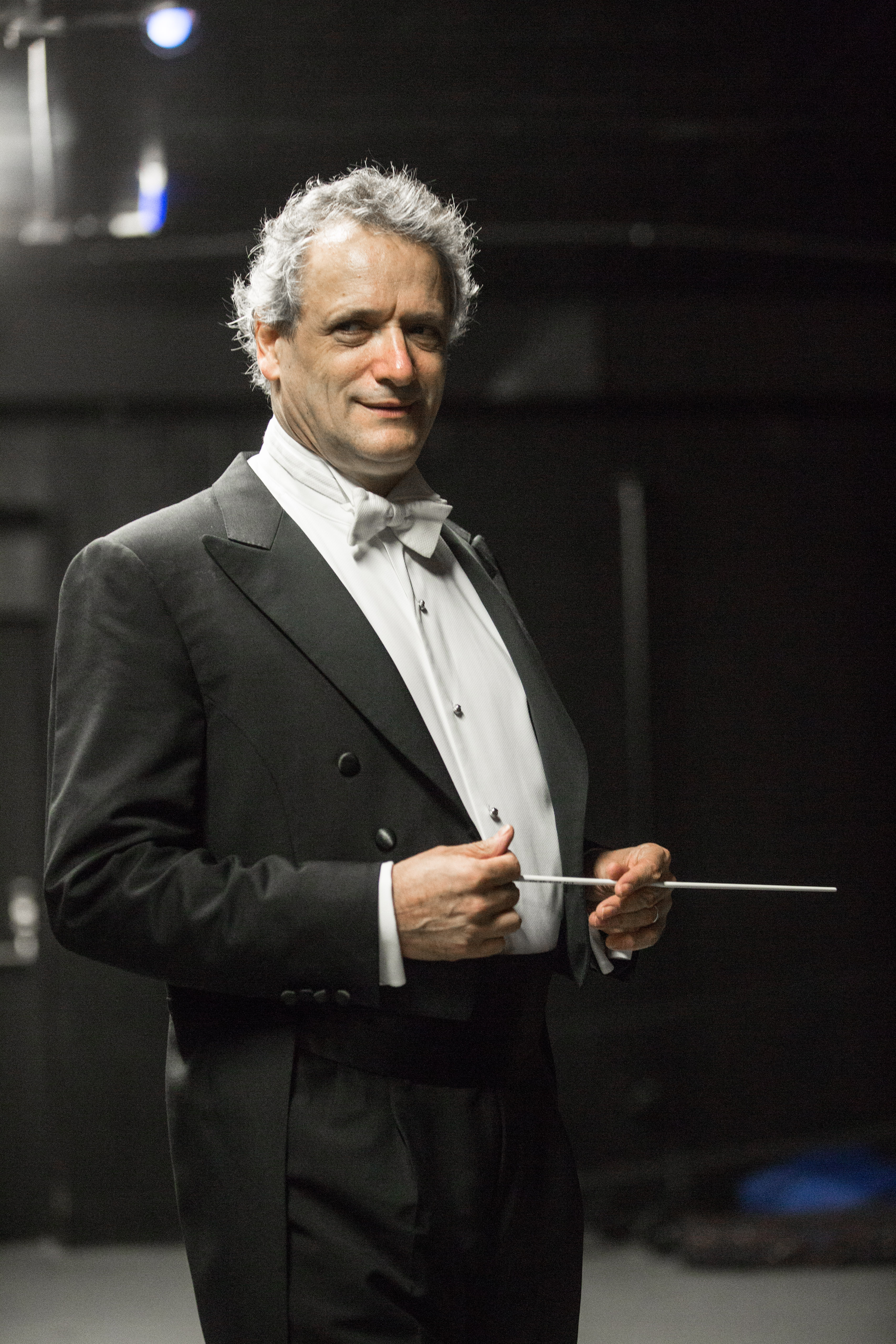
- Louis Langrée in 2017

Background information
- Born: 11 January 1961 (age 65); Mulhouse, France
- Occupation: Conductor

Louis Langrée (born 11 January 1961) is a French conductor. He is the son of organist and theorist Alain Langrée.

== Biography ==
=== Early years ===
Langrée studied at the Strasbourg Conservatory, but had no formal academic training in conducting. He began his career as a vocal coach and assistant at the Opéra National de Lyon, from 1983 to 1986. He then worked as an assistant conductor at the Aix-en-Provence Festival, and held a comparable post with the Bayreuth Festival. From 1989 to 1992, he was an assistant conductor with l'Orchestre de Paris.

==== UK and Europe ====
In Europe and the UK, Langrée has been music director of the Orchestre de Picardie (1993–1998), the Opéra National de Lyon (1998–2000), Glyndebourne Touring Opera (1998–2003), and the Orchestre Philharmonique de Liège (2001–2006). In June 2011, Langrée was named principal conductor of the Camerata Salzburg, effective September 2011, with an initial contract of 5 seasons. Langrée was the most recent conductor to hold the title of principal conductor of the Camerata Salzburg, and stood down from the post in 2016. In October 2021, the French Ministry of Culture announced the appointment of Langrée as the next music director of the Théâtre national de l'Opéra-Comique, effective 1 November 2021, with an initial contract of 5 years.

==== United States ====
Langrée made his first US conducting appearance in 1991 at the Spoleto Festival USA. In December 2002, he was named music director of the Mostly Mozart Festival (Lincoln Center, New York City), and formally took up the post in the summer of 2003. In March 2005, his initial contract with Mostly Mozart was extended to 2008. His contract with Mostly Mozart, previously through 2017, was further extended, in April 2017, through 2020. In July 2019, the festival announced the extension of Langrée's contract through 2023. Langrée concluded his tenure as music director of the Mostly Mozart Festival in the summer of 2023, the last music director of the Mostly Mozart Festival Orchestra with the orchestra under that name.

Langrée first guest-conducted the Cincinnati Symphony Orchestra in March 2011. Based on that appearance, in April 2012, the Cincinnati Symphony Orchestra appointed Langrée its 13th music director, as of the 2013–2014 season, with an initial contract of 4 years. He assumed the title of music director designate with immediate effect. In March 2015, the Cincinnati Symphony announced the extension of Langrée's contract as music director through the 2019–2020 season. In February 2017, the orchestra further extended his Cincinnati contract through the 2021–2022 season. In January 2020, the Cincinnati Symphony announced the newest extension of his contract, through the 2023–2024 season. In June 2021, the Cincinnati Symphony announced that Langrée is to conclude his tenure as its music director at the close of the 2023–2024 season.

=== Recordings ===
Langrée has made several recordings for Virgin Classics, with the Orchestra of the Opera National de Lyon, the Orchestra of the Age of Enlightenment, the Camerata Salzburg and Le Concert d'Astrée. With the Orchestre Philharmonique de Liège, he has recorded for Universal/Accord symphonies of Franck and Chausson, piano concertos of Liszt, Ravel and Schulhoff (soloist, Claire-Marie Le Guay), and for the Cypress label, works for clarinet and orchestra by Mozart, Rossini and Weber (soloist, Jean-Luc Votano). Several of his recordings have received awards, including the Victoire de la musique, MIDEM, Diapason d'Or, and Gramophone awards. Langrée was a co-recipient of the Best Musical Achievement for Opera award from the Royal Philharmonic Society for his conducting of the 2001 Glyndebourne Opera production of Fidelio. In 2007, he was a winner of the Grand Prix Antoine Livio de la Presse Musicale Internationale. With the Cincinnati Symphony Orchestra, Langrée has recorded music commissioned for the orchestra by Zhou Tian, Thierry Escaich, and Sebastian Currier.

=== Personal life ===
Langrée and his wife Aimée Clark-Langrée, a writer for French television, have two children. The family resides in Paris. In 2006, Langrée was made a Chevalier des Arts et des Lettres.

Cultural offices
Preceded by Patrick Fournillier	Music Director, Orchestre de Picardie; 1993–1998	Succeeded by Edmon Colomer
Preceded by Kent Nagano	Music Director, Opéra National de Lyon; 1998–2000	Succeeded by Iván Fischer
Preceded by Ivor Bolton	Music Director, Glyndebourne Touring Opera; 1998–2003	Succeeded by Edward Gardner
Preceded by Pierre Bartholomée	Music Director, Orchestre Philharmonique de Liège; 2001–2006	Succeeded by Pascal Rophé
Preceded by Gerard Schwarz	Music Director, Mostly Mozart Festival; 2003–2023	Succeeded by Jonathon Heyward (music director, Festival Orchestra of Lincoln Center)
Preceded by Leonidas Kavakos	Principal Conductor, Camerata Salzburg; 2011–2016	Succeeded by (post vacant)
Preceded by Olivier Mantei	Music Director, Opéra-Comique; 2021–present	Succeeded by incumbent
