= Georgia Koumará =

Greek composer

Georgia Koumará (born 1991 in Thessaloniki), is a Greek composer. She currently lives in Cologne. Her musical style plays with time (perceived, conceptual and measured), texture and energy, and her works are often quasi-theatrical in nature.

She was a student of Johannes Schöllhorn, Michalis Lapidakis, Kostas Siempis, Lenio Liatsou and Lilia Vaseiliadou.

Her 2012 work, astropedo, for voice and piano, is based on a text by Angelos Kyriou. The work explores various psychological states, some of them violent; the piano part is made percussive through the use of preparations, and the vocal part involves extensive use of extended vocal techniques.

In 2015, her orchestral work, Schrödinger's Cat, was performed by the WDR Orchestra, and was subsequently broadcast on WDR 3 on March 11, 2015.

Her work, Walk in and Find Your Supper, was commissioned and premiered in 2016 by the German ensemble hand werk at Cologne's New Talents festival. Written for flute, clarinet, violin, cello and performer, the piece tells the story of a game, where the musicians start by only playing their instruments, when gradually the performer enters: he is searching for an object on stage, the musicians reveal that they know where it is, but they are teasing him, and the piece ends with the performer frustrated, surrounded by chaos, as the four musicians verbally taunt him.

In 2018, she wrote Dangerous Conjectures for the German ensemble Ascolta, which was premiered at ECLAT festival in Stuttgart. In the same year, she also wrote a piece for the German duo leise dröhnung, called Through Hell & High Water.
