= Philippe Bender =

French flautist and conductor

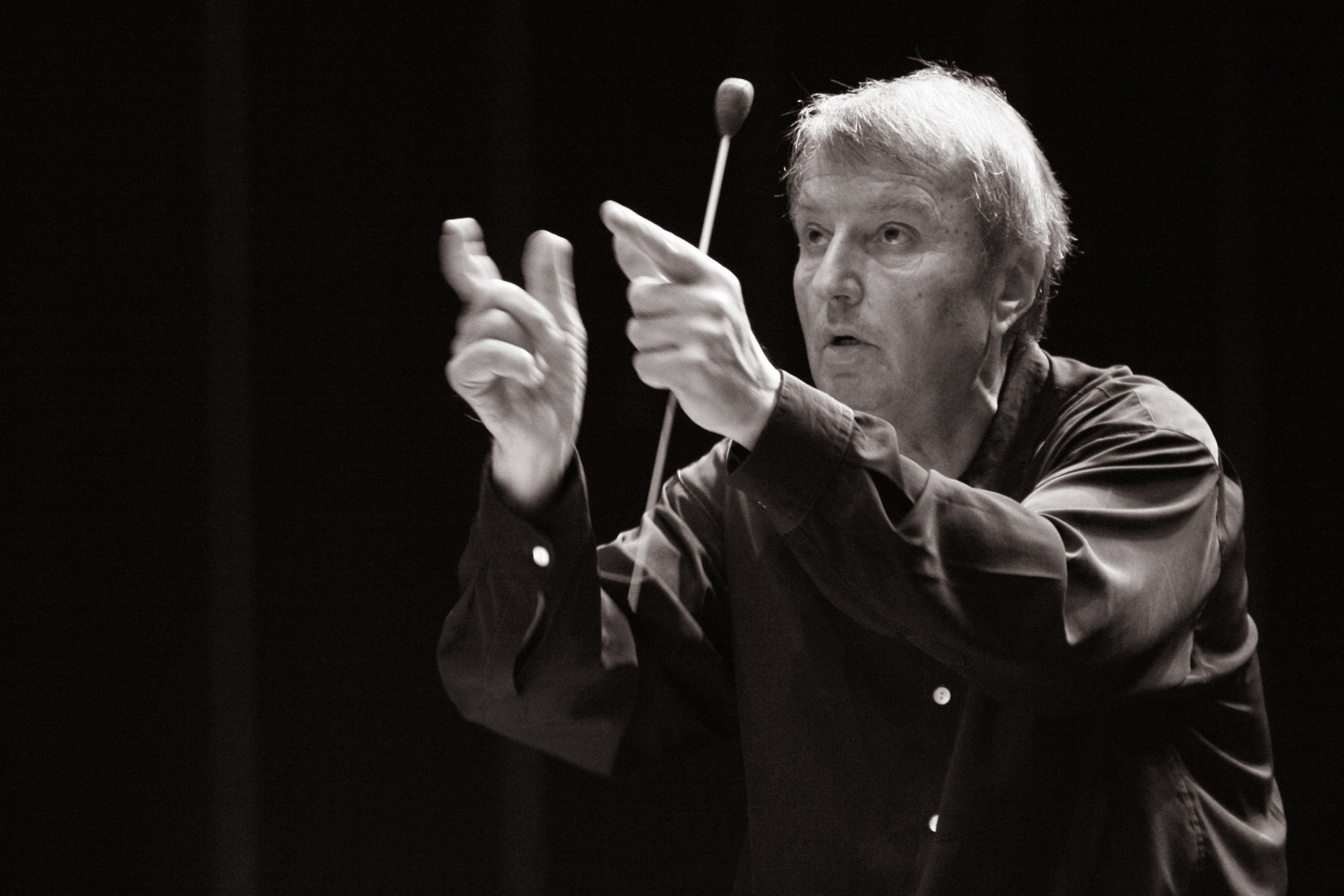
Philippe Bender in 2005

Philippe Bender (born 25 February 1942 in Besançon, France) is a French flautist and conductor.

In 1976, he was appointed artistic director and permanent chef of the Orchestre national de Cannes He is also titular conductor and artistic director of the Orchestre symphonique des Baléares in Palma de Mallorca.

In 2013, he retired and was succeeded by Wolfgang Doerner as head of the Orchestre national de Cannes.

== Career ==
After starting his musical studies in his native city of Besançon, he furthered them at the Conservatoire de Paris where he won three first prizes in 1959.

He studied at the Hochschule für Musik in Freiburg im Breisgau, then at the Juilliard School in New York from which he graduated. He was then a concert flutist and won several international competitions: Geneva, Munich, Montreux.

From 1960 to 1968, he pursued a career as a soloist which took him to Switzerland, Germany, Austria before joining the Monte-Carlo Philharmonic Orchestra where he met Paul Paray. The latter, discovering the musician's gifts as a conductor, encouraged him to take part in international competitions for young conductors.

Winner of the 1968 edition of the Besançon International Music Festival and gold medal at the prestigious 1970 New York Mitropoulos competition, Bender was hired as chief assistant at the New York Philharmonic where he worked under the successive directions of Leonard Bernstein and Pierre Boulez.

Since then, Bender has conducted many Western orchestras, including the American Symphony Orchestra of New York, the Orchestre de la Suisse Romande of Geneva and Lausanne, those of Francfort and Baden-Baden, the Hessischer Rundfunk Orchestra, the orchestras of The Hague, Rotterdam, Amsterdam, the New York Philharmonic, the Houston Symphony, the Orchestre Symphonique de Québec, the NHK Symphony Orchestra and Tokyo Philharmonic Orchestra, the Orchestre National de France, the Orchestre de Paris, the Ensemble instrumental de Paris. At the head of the Orchestra of the Calouste Gulbenkian Foundation, he has conducted, a series of concerts in India that brought him in particular to Bombay, New Delhi, and Chennai...

He is also regularly invited to the United States where he conducts various orchestras and participates in many festivals. Bender regularly conducts Spanish orchestras, including the Spanish National Orchestra.

With the Orchestre régional de Cannes-Provence-Alpes-Côte d'Azur Bender went to Japan, Morocco in the United States, Germany, Austria, Brazil and China for major tours that have taken him to New York, Washington, Tokyo, Osaka, São Paulo, Berlin and Vienna, Shanghai and Beijing.

On November 4, 2007, as part of the C'est pas classique event, he conducted the Orchestre de Cannes for the Première in France of Paul McCartney's Oratorio Ecce Cor Meum, composed in 2001.

On April 14, 2013, he conducted the final concert of the Cannes Orcpaca season, and won a triumph at the Théâtre Croisette in Cannes, for this performance shortly before his retirement with Bach's Brandenburg Concerto No. 5, Mozart's Piano Concerto No. 20 and schumann's Symphony No. 1.

The following year on 29 September, he conducted the Orcpaca, for a farewell concert at the Théâtre Debussy of the Palais des Festivals de Cannes, where he invited prestigious soloists who had already played for a long time under his baton: violinist Olivier Charlier, performing Beethoven's Violin Concerto, and clarinetist Michel Lethiec in Gershwin's Porgy and Bess. En finale, la salle lui rend une très longue ovation debout et, au cours d'une cérémonie amicale lui suivant, le député maire de Cannes, Bernard Brochand, lui remet la médaille d'Or de la ville de Cannes.

== Training and social mission ==
Bender also fulfils an important social mission, leading the orchestra, or smaller groups, in giving concerts for children in hospitals, the elderly or the disabled in disadvantaged neighbourhoods and even in prisons.

He regularly participates in activities in support of the Restos du Cœur by comedian and actor Coluche, giving concerts whose proceeds are entirely donated to the association.

In November 2012, he helped to instigate efforts from the musical world in a petition in support of Mexican conductor Rodolfo I. Cazares Solis kidnapped and held prisoner, hostage of a Mexican drug cartel since July 9, 2011.

== Conducting the orchestras of Cannes and Nice ==
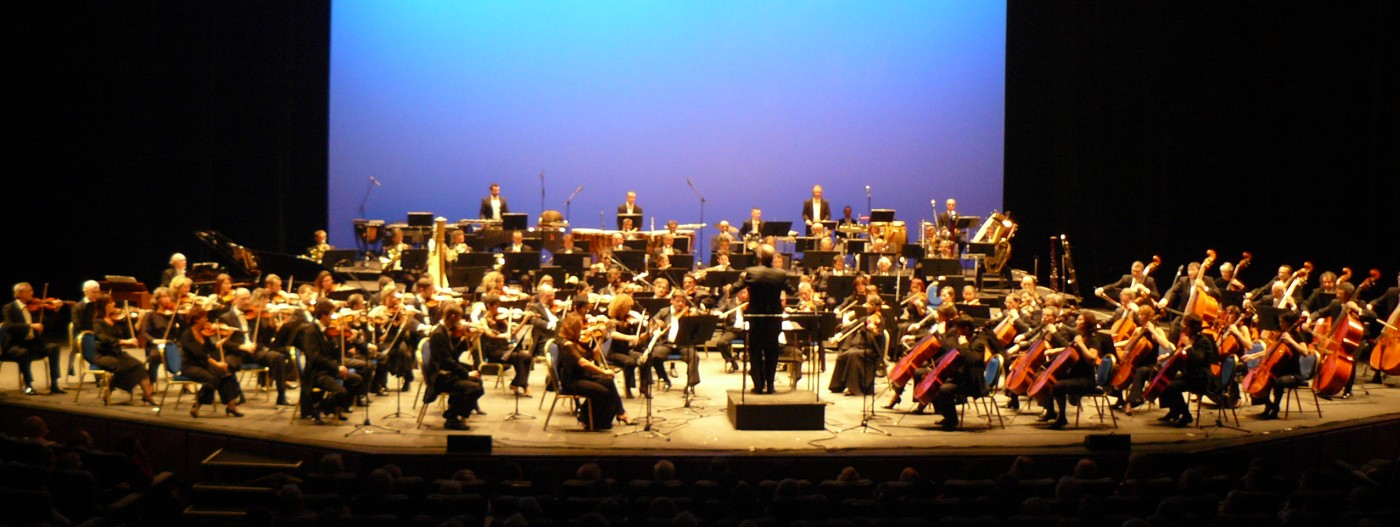
Bender conducts both orchestras at the C'est pas classique event, Nice, 2009

A merger project with the aim of eventually pooling their resources was initiated in 2009 between the Orchestre philharmonique de Nice and the Orchestre régional de Cannes-Provence-Alpes-Côte d'Azur. The project was officially abandoned in the course of 2010.

Dyring the final concert of the "C'est pas classique" event in Nice on 8 November 2009, however, the two orchestras performed together under the direction of Bender, performing in front of a very large audience: excerpts from West Side Story and Mahler's Symphony No 1 last mouvement.

== Awards ==
- Bender is a gold medalist in the prestigious Mitropoulos competition of New York in 1970.
- Bender is Chevalier in the order of the Légion d'honneur.
- On January 26, 2005, at the presentation of the Victoire d'honneur awarded by the Victoires de la musique classique, Patrick de Carolis and Frédéric Lodéon have honored Bender and the Orchestre Régional de Cannes Provence Alpes Côte d'Azur for all the work done with young people, in the region and internationally.
