= Camerata Salzburg =

Austrian chamber orchestra

The Camerata Salzburg is an Austrian chamber orchestra based in Salzburg, Austria. The Camerata's principal concert venue is the Mozarteum University.

== History ==
Bernhard Paumgartner founded the ensemble in 1952 as the Camerata Academica des Mozarteums Salzburg, comprising his fellow teachers and students from the Mozarteum. He served as its director and de facto principal conductor until his death in 1971. Antonio Janigro became the new leader of the Camerata in 1974, the same year when the first abonnement series of concerts were performed in Salzburg. Sándor Végh then served as principal conductor of the Camerata from 1978 until his death in 1997. Roger Norrington became principal conductor of the Camerata in 1997, and held the post until 2006. During his tenure, Norrington placed greater emphasis on historically informed performance practices. Leonidas Kavakos was principal guest artist of the Camerata from 2001 through 2006, and artistic director from 2007 until his resignation in July 2009, citing "instability in the orchestra's management". In June 2011, Louis Langrée was named the sixth principal conductor of the Camerata, effective September 2011, with an initial contract of 5 seasons. Langrée was the most recent conductor to hold the title of principal conductor of the ensemble, and stood down from the post in 2016. The musicians of the orchestra now make artistic decisions for the ensemble without a principal conductor.

The Camerata Salzburg has made commercial recordings for such labels as Decca, Warner Classics and Sony Classical.

== Awards ==
- Europäischer Kulturpreis 1999 in the category "chamber orchestra"

== Principal conductors and artistic directors ==
- Bernhard Paumgartner (1952–1971)
- Antonio Janigro (1974–1978)
- Sándor Végh (1978–1997)
- Roger Norrington (1997–2006)
- Leonidas Kavakos (2007–2009)
- Louis Langrée (2011–2016)
