= Poul Jørgensen (conductor) =

Danish conductor

Poul Jørgensen (26 October 1934 – 2003) was a Danish conductor who won first prize in the International Besançon Competition for Young Conductors. He led the University Choir Lille MUKO of the University of Copenhagen.
