= Marc Soustrot =

French classical conductor (born 1949)

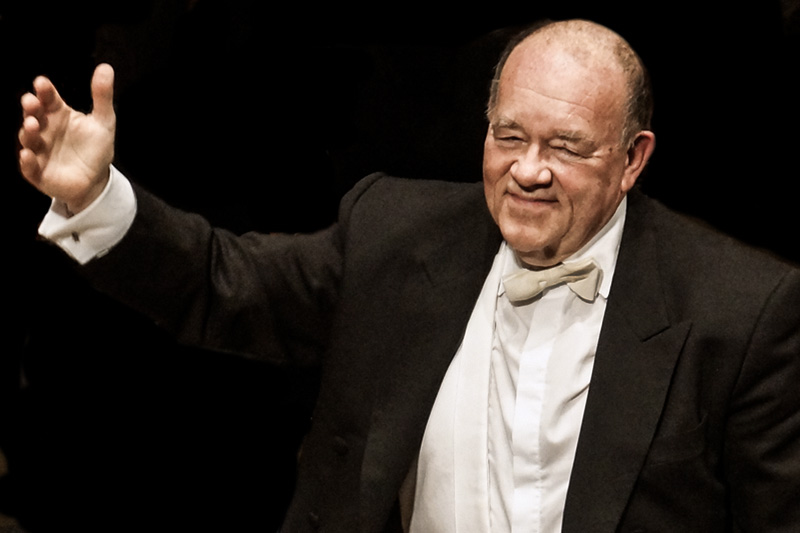
- Soustrot directing Mahlers 3. symphony in Aarhus, Denmark 2017
- Born: 15 April 1949 (age 75); Lyon, France
- Education: Conservatoire de Lyon; Conservatoire de Paris
- Occupations: Conductor; Generalmusikdirektor
- Organizations: Orchestre national des Pays de la Loire; Beethoven Orchester Bonn; Malmö Symphony Orchestra; Aarhus Symphony Orchestra
- Awards: Chevalier de la Legion d'honneur

Marc Soustrot (born 15 April 1949) is a French classical conductor. He was the music director of the Orchestre national des Pays de la Loire from 1976 to 1994, and from 1995 to 2003 GMD of the Beethoven Orchester Bonn which plays in both opera and concert. He has worked at major opera houses in Europe and made several recordings, such as Leonore, Beethoven's first version of Fidelio, the piano concertos and symphonies by Camille Saint-Saëns, Honegger's Jeanne d'Arc au bûcher, and Penderecki's St Luke Passion.

== Career ==
Born in Lyon, Soustrot first studied there at the Conservatoire de Lyon from 1962 to 1969. He continued his studies at the Conservatoire de Paris, in particular in piano, trombone, chamber music, and conducting (under Rosenthal and Tzipine). In 1974 he won first prize in the international conducting competition in London, which led to becoming assistant conductor to André Previn at the London Symphony Orchestra, and in the following year succeeded Jean-Claude Casadesus as assistant conductor of the Orchestre national des Pays de la Loire of which he became music director from 1976 to 1994. Soustrot resigned as director of the Opéra de Nantes in 1989 in protest at a 50% reduction in its state subsidy following a change of government in Nantes after local elections, also accusing the French government of diverting money from provincial companies to the Opéra Bastille.

From 1995 to 2003, he was GMD of the Beethoven Orchester Bonn, where he conducted the first performance of Beethoven's Leonore, the first version of the later Fidelio, since 1806. He led the Brabants Orkest Eindhoven from 1996 to 2006. From the 2011/12 season, he has been the Malmö Symphony Orchestra's Chief Conductor, and from the 2015/16 season also conductor of the Aarhus Symphony Orchestra.

He conducted at the Staatsoper Stuttgart Gounod's Faust, Bizet's Carmen, and Wagner's Siegfried and Götterdämmerung. He conducted Debussy's Pelléas et Mélisande at the Semperoper in Dresden, staged by Àlex Ollé of the company La Fura dels Baus.

In a run of Offenbach's Les Contes d'Hoffmann in Geneva, one critic wrote "The Orchestre de la Suisse Romande sparkled under Marc Soustrot, [...] Soustrot's light touch and dramatic punch gave the evening an atmosphere of momentum and musical brilliance, and helped one to forget the stylistic imbalances in the music. For his conducting of Berg's Wozzeck, he was described as "an impressive conductor, avoiding anything artificial but aiming for what Berg had in mind: a sensual effect of magnificent sounds."

He conducted in 2017 at the Oper Frankfurt a double bill of Debussy's cantata La Damoiselle élue and Honegger's dramatic oratorio Jeanne d'Arc au bûcher, again staged by Ollé, and co-produced with the Teatro Real Madrid. A reviewer noted that the conductor "creates a unique musical wonderworld" ("Soustrot erschafft eine einzigartige musikalische Wunderwelt"), with pianos, celesta and Ondes Martenots highlighting special moments. Hans-Klaus Jungheinrich wrote in the Frankfurter Rundschau: "Umsichtig und stilgenau differenzierten Gastdirigent Marc Soustrot und das Opernorchester zwischen der behutsam abgetönten Debussy-Klanglichkeit und dem breiten Pinsel einer auch gröbste Wirkung souverän einbeziehenden Interpretation der Honegger-Textur." (Prudently and precise in style, the guest conductor Marc Soustrot and the opera orchestra differentiated between the carefully toned Debussy sonority and an interpretation of the broader brush of the Honegger texture, including even crude effects souvereignly).

He is from a musical family; his younger brother is the trumpet-player Bernard Soustrot.

== Recordings ==
His discography includes Auber's Fra Diavolo with Monte Carlo forces, Saint-Saëns piano concertos (with Romain Descharmes), cello concertos n° 1 & 2 (with Gabriel Schwabe) and symphonies with the Malmö Symphony Orchestra, Bizet's Symphony in C, Carmen and L'Arlésienne Suites, Debussy's La Mer and Prélude à l'après-midi d'un faune and Ravel's Daphnis et Chloé (Suite No. 2) with the Orchestre Philharmonique des Pays de Loire.

Larger works recorded in Bonn include Beethoven's Leonore (1806 version) with the Kölner Rundfunkchor and Orchester der Beethovenhalle Bonn, and Krenek's opera Karl V. He recorded Penderecki's St Luke Passion with the WDR Rundfunkchor Köln, the NDR Chor and the Mainzer Domchor.

In 2009 Soustrot recorded Philippe Gaubert's Le Chevalier et la Damoiselle and other works with the Orchestre philharmonique du Luxembourg. He recorded in 2015 Honegger's Jeanne d’Arc au bûcher with the Orquestra Simfònica de Barcelona. In 2017, he records Camille Saint-Saëns Complete Piano Concertos 1-5 and other works for piano and orchestra with the Malmö Symphony Orchestra (Naxos 2017).

== Awards ==
In 1974 Soustrot won First Prize in the international competition of the Rupert Fondation de Londres, and in 1975 the First Prize of the Besançon International Music Festival. He was awarded the title of a Chevalier de la Legion d'honneur in 2008.
