= John Axelrod =

American conductor (born 1966)

John Neal Axelrod
- Born: March 28, 1966 (age 60); Houston, Texas
- Education: St. John's School; Harvard University
- Occupation: conductor
- Spouses: Annette Gerlach; Anastasia (m. 2018)
- Children: 3
- Website: https://johnaxelrod.com/

John Neal Axelrod (born March 28, 1966, in Houston, Texas) is a Swiss/American conductor. In 2024, Axelrod was named Music Director and Principal Conductor of the newly created Swiss National Orchestra. Axelrod was elected Principal Conductor of the Bucharest Symphony Orchestra in a unique open ended contract in 2022. From 2019 to 2023 He was Principal Guest Conductor of the City of Kyoto Symphony Orchestra. He was also elected Artistic and musical director of the Royal Symphony Orchestra of Seville in 2014 and is Principal Conductor of the Orchestra Sinfonica di Milano, "Giuseppe Verdi", also known as "LaVerdi". Between 2009 and 2013, Axelrod was music director of l'Orchestre National des Pays de la Loire, based in Nantes and Angers, France; and from 2009 to 2011, Axelrod served as music director of "Hollywood In Vienna" Gala Concerts with the ORF Radio Symphony Orchestra, Vienna. He has also served as music director and Chief Conductor of the Lucerne Symphony Orchestra from 2004 to 2009, and from 2001 to 2009 as Principal Guest Conductor of Sinfonietta Cracovia.

== Early life ==
Axelrod was born in Houston, Texas, on March 28, 1966. From the age of 5, Axelrod studied piano with Jacquelyn Harbachick and Roberto Eyzaguirre. At the age of 16 he was accepted as a student by Leonard Bernstein, during the premiere of his final opera, A Quiet Place, for Houston Grand Opera. Axelrod graduated cum laude in 1984 from St. John's School and went on to Harvard University, where he completed a bachelor's degree in music in 1988. After a summer jazz course in 1985 he continued his jazz piano and improvisation studies with Craig Najjar at the Berklee School of Music in Boston. Axelrod moved to Los Angeles following his studies, working as an A&R Executive for Atlantic and RCA/BMG Records until 1991. He worked briefly as an artist manager for Iron John Management, started his own production company, "Ivy League Records", and eventually became Director of the Robert Mondavi Wine and Food Center in Costa Mesa, California, in 1994. After deciding to return to music in 1995, he studied conducting at the St. Petersburg Conservatory in Russia with Ilya Musin. In 1996 Axelrod founded Houston's former Orchestra X, where he served as artistic director and Conductor. He also studied with then Houston Symphony Music Director Christoph Eschenbach and became his assistant in 1999 at the Schleswig Holstein Music Festival and for Parsifal, at Bayreuth in 2000.

== Conductor ==
In 2004, Axelrod was named Chief Conductor of the Luzerner Sinfonieorchester and music director of the Luzern Theater in Switzerland. During his 5-year tenure he appeared at the Lucerne Festival each summer, performing in both concert and opera.

In April 2009 Axelrod was elected as music director of the l'Orchestre National des Pays de la Loire (ONPL), based in Nantes and Angers, France. He assumed the title of Music Director Designé with the 2009–2010 season, and began his full duties as music director for the 2010–2011 season.

In July 2009, Axelrod was appointed music director of the Hollywood in Vienna Gala Concert with the Radio Symphony Orchestra Vienna. The first of his concert performances was on October 14, 2009, in the Konzerthaus of Vienna.

From the 2011/12 season, he is the Principal Conductor of the Orchestra Sinfonica di Milano Giuseppe Verdi also known as "laVerdi".

In November 2014, Axelrod was elected Artistic and musical director of the Royal Symphony Orchestra of Seville.

In July 2017, Axelrod was elected CEO (Consejero Delegado) in addition to his Artistic and musical director duties of the Royal Symphony Orchestra of Seville.

In January 2020, Axelrod was elected Principal Guest Conductor of the Kyoto Symphony Orchestra, in Japan.

In August 2022, Axelrod was elected Principal Conductor of the Bucharest Symphony Orchestra, in Romania.

In December 2023, Axelrod was elected as founding Music Director and Principal of the newly created Swiss National Orchestra.

== Guest conductor ==
Axelrod has conducted over 175 orchestras around the world, including many of the world's leading orchestras such as, in Europe: the London Philharmonic, Royal Philharmonic, London Philharmonia, the Royal Scottish National Orchestra, the Philharmonia Orchestra, NDR Sinfonieorchester Hamburg, Accademia Nazionale di Santa Cecilia Orchestra, Israeli Philharmonic, Oslo Philharmonic, Orchestre Philharmonique de Monte-Carlo, the Royal Stockholm Philharmonic, the Hungarian National Philharmonic, Swedish Radio Orchestra, Polish National Radio Orchestra, the Mariinsky Theatre Orchestra in St. Petersburg, at Vienna's Musikverein and Konzerthaus with the Vienna Radio Symphony, Gürzenich Orchestra Köln, Berlin's Rundfunk-Sinfonieorchester, Orchestre National de Lyon, Camerata Salzburg, Orchestra della Svizzera Italiana, and the Salzburg Mozarteum. In Asia: the Shanghai Symphony Orchestra, NHK Symphony Orchestra, Tokyo Metropolitan Symphony Orchestra, Yomiuri Nippon Symphony Orchestra, Orchestra Ensemble Kanazawa and City of Kyoto Symphony; and in North America: the Chicago Symphony Orchestra, Los Angeles Philharmonic, Philadelphia Orchestra, National Symphony Orchestra, Columbus Symphony Orchestra, Buffalo Philharmonic, New Jersey Symphony Orchestra and Toronto Symphony. He has also been a regular guest of the Leipzig Gewandhaus Orchestra, Orchestre de Paris, Dresden Philharmonic, NDR Radiophilharmonie of Hanover, Sinfonica Nazionale della RAI Torino, Orchestra del Teatro San Carlo di Napoli, Teatro alla Scala, Teatro la Fenice, Maggio Musicale Fiorentino and Lisbon's Gulbenkian Orchestra.

In 2003, Axelrod premiered with the Chicago Symphony Orchestra and Chorus at the Ravinia Festival the Samuel Pisar text for the Symphony 3 "Kaddish," by Leonard Bernstein. He recorded this version for Nimbus with the Lucerne Symphony Orchestra in 2006 at the Lucerne Festival.

In 2007, Axelrod recorded Holocaust - A Music Memorial Film, directed by James Kent on the grounds of Auschwitz BBC TWO with Sinfonietta Cracovia, performing Mozart's Requiem, Gorecki's Symphony 3, with soprano Isabel Bayrakdarian and the Kaiser's aria from Kaiser von Atlantis with baritone Gerald Finley. in 2005, the documentary won an international Emmy Award.

During the summer of 2009 Axelrod made a unique European and North American tour at the invitation of Chinese pianist Lang Lang and legendary jazz musician Herbie Hancock, performing in such venues as the Montreux Jazz Festival Arena di Verona, Royal Albert Hall, the Ruhr Piano Festival, Rotterdam North Sea Jazz, the Ravenna Festival, the Ravinia Festival, the Mann Center, Massey Hall, and the Hollywood Bowl.

From 2009 to 2011, Axelrod was the music director of the annual red carpet broadcast event in the Konzerthaus Vienna Hollywood in Vienna with the Vienna Radio Symphony Orchestra, performing film music by such composers as John Williams, Alexandre Desplat, Howard Shore, Alan Silverstri, Max Steiner, Erich Wolfgang Korngold and many more.

In 2017, Axelrod made history walking down the steps dressed as Darth Vader at Het Concertgebouw in Amsterdam, performing Star Wars by John Williams.

In 2012, Axelrod, as music director of the Orchestre National des Pays de la Loire, recorded with French Mezzo Soprano Véronique Gens works by Berlioz and Ravel, for Ondine. With the Orchestre National des Pays de la Loire, he also recorded made the first recording by a French orchestra of L'Eventail de Jeanne for Naxos. With this orchestra, he also recorded with Swiss violinist Rachel Kolly d'Alba works by Chausson and Ravel for Warner Classics, released in 2011. This CD won the "ICMA 2012 Award" in the "concertos" category (International Classical Music Awards).

In 2011, Axelrod achieved critical acclaim for his Salzburg Festival debut with percussionist Martin Grubinger in a reprise of the marathon Concert they performed in 2006 in Vienna's Musikverein. Since then, Axelrod has made many tours with professional youth orchestras, including Accademia della Scala, Orchestra Giovanile Italiana, Junge Norddeutsche Philharmonie, and the Wiener Jeunesse Orchester.

Soloists whom Axelrod has often worked with include: Julia Fischer, Veronique Gens, Martin Grubinger, Thomas Hampson, Dietrich Henschel, Daniel Hope, Patricia Kopatchinskaja, Lang Lang, Sabine Meyer, Fazıl Say, Lilya Zilberstein, and Chen Reiss.

Axelrod has premiered many new works by such composers as Wolfgang Rihm (Sotte Voce II), Kaija Saariaho (Nymphea Reflection), Gabriel Prokoviev (Remix of Beethoven's 9th for electronica and Orchestra), Fazıl Say (1001 Nights in a Harem), Marco Stroppa (Rittratti Senza Volto), Michael Gordon (Grey, Pink, Yellow), Karim al-Zand (7th Voyage of Sindbad), Anthony K. Brandt (Express), and Wojciech Kilar (September Symphony).

== Opera ==
Axelrod's opera activity includes the premiere performances of Bernstein's Candide (directed by Robert Carsen) at Paris's Théâtre du Châtelet and Milano's Teatro alla Scala and the new production of Krenek's Kehraus um St. Stephan at the Bregenzer Festspiele. In his past seasons at the Luzerner Theater he conducted new productions of Kaiser von Atlantis (for the Lucerne Festival), Rigoletto, Rake's Progress (for the Lucerne Festival), Il Barbiere di Siviglia, Die Dreigroschenoper (for the Lucerne Festival), Evgeni Onegin, Idomeneo (for the Lucerne Festival), Falstaff and Don Giovanni (for the Lucerne Festival) and Puccini's 'Gianni Schicchi and 'Turandot (for the Puccini Festival in 2021 and 2022). In 2009, he also conducted Tristan and Isolde (directed by Olivier Py), for Angers/Nantes Opera. 2014 Opera performances include "Evgeni Onegin" at Teatro San Carlo di Napoli.

== Recent recordings and projects ==
John Axelrod features in a number of audio and video recordings on YouTube. Axelrdo's most recent recordings include "Schumann 41/51: Florestan & Eusebius," with both versions of Schumann's D minor Symphony op. 120, known as the 4th Symphony, (released in 2023 on Orchid Classics). "Brahms Beloved", Brahms Symphony cycle performed by LaVerdi with Clara Schumann lieder, featuring Axelrod on piano and vocalists Indra Thomas, Nicole Cabell, Wolfgang Holzmair and Dame Felicity Lott (released in 2013 on Telarc International), "French Impressions" : works for violin and Orchestra, Rachel Kolly d'Alba, Orchestre National des Pays de la Loire by Ravel, Saint-Saëns, Chausson, Eugène Ysaÿe (released 2011 on Warner Classics), "American Serenade" : works for violin and Orchestra by Bernstein, Gershwin, Waxman, with Rachel Kolly d'Alba John Axelrod (released 2012 on Warner Classics), Berlioz and Ravel with Veronique Gens released in 2011 on Ondine; Gorecki Symphony 3 with the Danish Radio Symphony Orchestra and soprano Isabel Bayrakdarian on Sony Classics, Wolfgang Rihm's newly commissioned piano concerto "Sotto Voce II" (together with Sotto Voce I) with pianist Nicolas Hodges and the Luzerner Sinfonie Orchester on the Kairos Label; Fazıl Say's new violin concerto "1001 Nights in a Harem" with Patricia Kopatchinskaya and the Luzerner Sinfonie Orchester on Naive; 2 discs featuring works by Franz Schreker and his students Ernst Krenek and Julius Burger, and a live recording from the 2006 Lucerne Festival of Bernstein's "Third Symphony" ('Kaddish'), Schoenberg's "Survivor from Warsaw", and Weill's "Berliner Requiem", all with the Luzerner Sinfonie Orchester for the Nimbus label; Dvořák's Ninth Symphony with the Württemburgischer Philharmonie Reutlingen for the Genuin label; Works by Wladyslaw Szpilman with the Berlin Radio Orchestra for SonyClassical; and Rolf Wallin's percussion concerto "Das war schön!" with Martin Grubinger and the Oslo Philharmonic for the Ondine label.

Recent DVDs include: the 2007 Emmy Award-winning BBC Holocaust: A Musical Memorial, for which Axelrod and Sinfoneitta Cracovia were the first orchestra to perform on the grounds of Auschwitz since its liberation; the 2008 ARTE production of Die Nacht, featuring Symphonie Fantastique and Sinfonietta Cracovia, and the 2008 Bregenzer Festpiele production of Krenek's opera, Kerhaus um St. Stephan. Axelrod has also released a recording of his own compositions, How Do I Love Thee, Love Songs for the Romantic at Heart, on the Marquis Classics Label.

Axelrod is also the owner of CMO: ConductorsMasterclassOnline.com, offering online conducting training and IamBacchus.com, a blog about wine and food based on a quote from Beethoven, and co-owner of AD Productions and the recording: "ClassicalRock," featuring the best hits of Classical and the best hits of Classic Rock. Released in 2012 by In-Akustik, ClassicalRock will be performed in Montreux on April 5, 2014, as part of La Saison Culturelle.

In 2012, Axelrod also authored the book: "Wie Großartige Musik Ensteht...Oder Auch Nicht. Ansichten des Dirigenten," published the Henschel/Schott. After "Spiegel Online" declared the success of this book, Naxos ebooks published in 2013 the original English version "The Symphony Orchestra in Crisis: A Conductor's View." in 2015, his 2nd book, "Lenny and Me: On Conducting Bernstein's Symphonies" was released as an ebook on Amazon. In 2020, Axelrod authored "Big Notes: How A Stradivarius Makes Money and Music," published by Clink Street Publishing. The book, a guide for investing in rare instruments, was published in 2022 in the Italian Version, by Edizione Curci, entitled: "Suono Ricco: Musica e mercato del lusso: investire in strumenti rari."

== Honors and awards ==
In 2020, Axelrod was awarded a special achievement by the International Classical Music Awards. He was awarded the Pacesetter Award by Fast Company Magazine, and was named one of Houston's 25 Power People by Inside Houston magazine. He was also a member of Leadership Houston Class XVIII, and is a member of the Franco-American Foundation.

== Personal life ==
Axelrod currently lives between Chardonne, Switzerland, Strasbourg, France, and Venice, Italy, and has a daughter, named Tallulah Charlotte Gerlach Axelrod, born on May 11, 2003, with German TV host and journalist Annette Gerlach.

In July 2018, he celebrated his wedding with Anastasia, a Russian national, in Seville, Spain, after they have been already married in Moscow in February 2018. The couple has a son, named Max, born on May 25, 2018.. They recently welcomed their 2nd son, Aaron, on January 9, 2025.

His interests include Italian cuisine, wine, and travel.
