= Johannes Schöllhorn =

German composer

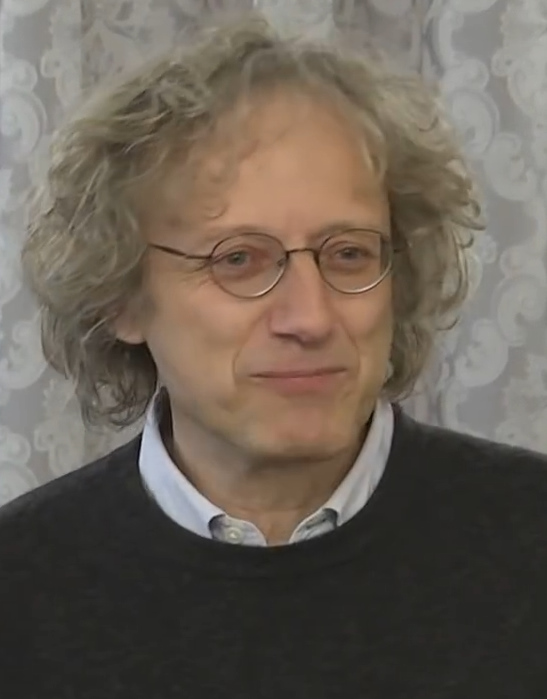
Johannes Schöllhorn in April 2019

Johannes Schöllhorn (born 30 June 1962) is a contemporary German composer.

Born in Murnau am Staffelsee, Schöllhorn grew up in Marktoberdorf. He studied musical composition with Klaus Huber, Emmanuel Nunes and Mathias Spahlinger and music theory with Peter Förtig at the Hochschule für Musik Freiburg. He also attended conducting courses with Péter Eötvös.

He taught at the Zurich University of the Arts from 1995 to 2000 and from 2001 to 2009 as a professor for composition at the Hochschule für Musik, Theater und Medien Hannover. Since 2009 he has been a professor at the Hochschule für Musik und Tanz Köln.

== Prizes ==
- 1997: Comité de Lecture of the Ensemble intercontemporain
- 2009: Praetorius Musikpreis.

== Notable students ==
- Georgia Koumará (born 1991), Greek composer, living in Germany
- Lisa Streich (born 1985), Swedish composer, living in Sweden.
