= Orchestre national des Pays de la Loire =

French symphony orchestra

- Orchestra
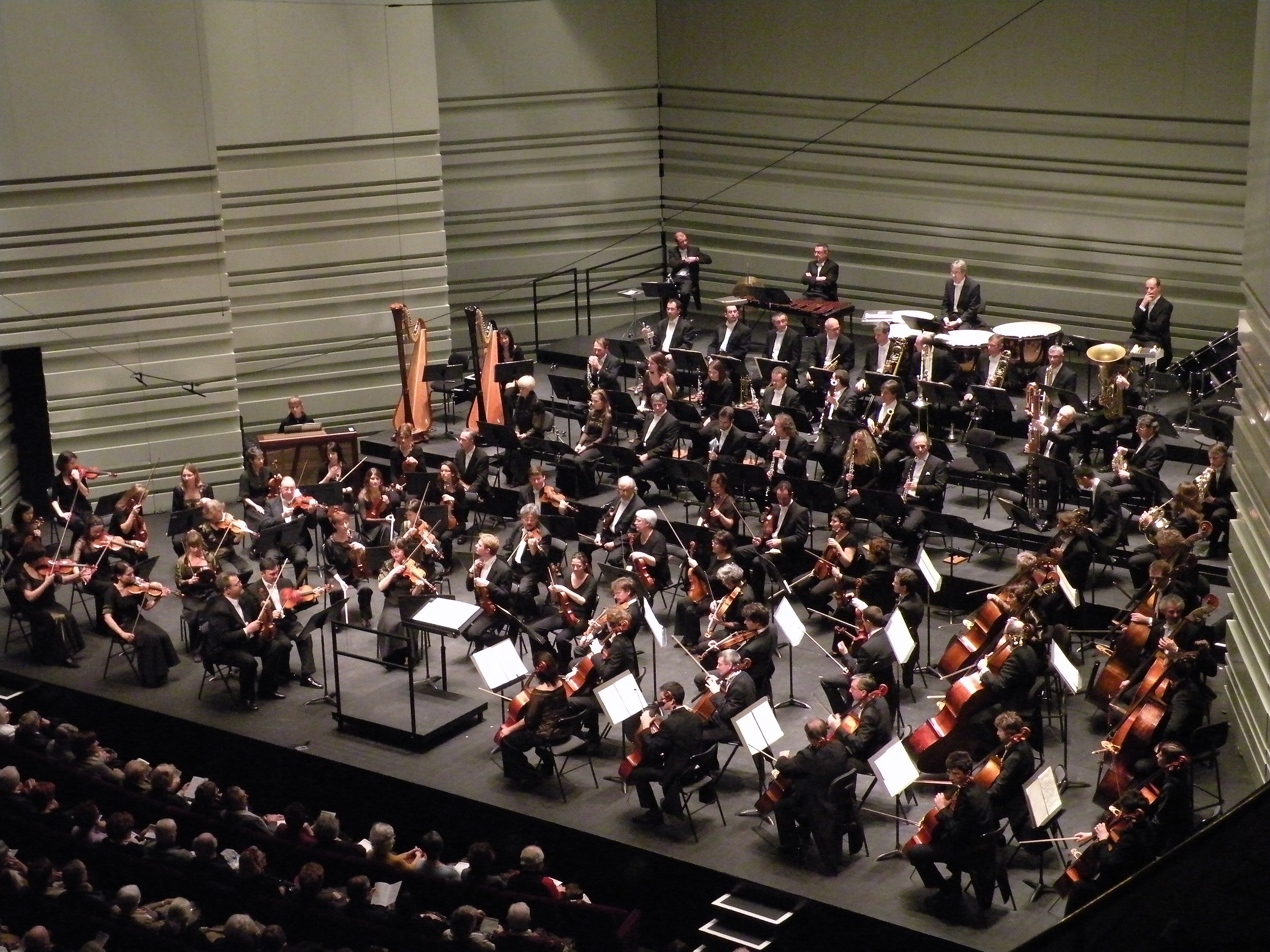
- The ONPL during la Folle Journée 2009
- Founded: 1971
- Location: Angers; Nantes
- Principal conductor: Sascha Goetzel
- Website: www.onpl.fr

The Orchestre national des Pays de la Loire (ONPL) is a French symphony orchestra based in Angers and Nantes. The orchestra receives support from the Regional Council of the Pays de la Loire, the French Ministry of Culture (Direction Régionale des Affaires Culturelles), the municipalities of Nantes and of Angers, and the General Councils of Loire-Atlantique, Maine-et-Loire, and La Vendée.

== History ==
The precursor ensembles to the future ONPL were the orchestra of the Opéra de Nantes and the orchestra of the Société des Concerts Populaires d'Angers. In 1971 these two orchestras united into a single organisation, the 114-member Orchestre Philharmonique des Pays de la Loire (OPPL), recruited by competition throughout France. It gave its first concert under that name in September 1971, with Pierre Dervaux, the OPPL's first music director, conducting. Dervaux served as music director until 1976. Although based in Angers and Nantes the orchestra gave concerts in all the main towns of the Loire region. In 1979 the orchestra toured to Romania, Bulgaria and Poland, and made its first visit to London in 1980.

Subsequent music directors were Marc Soustrot (1976-1994), Hubert Soudant (1994-2004), Isaac Karabtchevsky (2004-2010). In April 2009, the ONPL announced the appointment of John Axelrod as its next music director, effective September 2010, with an initial contract of 3 years. Axelrod concluded his ONPL tenure in 2013.

In February 2013, Pascal Rophé was appointed as music director of the ONPL, and he formally took up the post in September 2014. Rophé concluded his ONPL tenure at the close of the 2021-2022 season. In September 2021, the ONPL announced the appointment of Sascha Goetzel as its next music director, effective 1 September 2022, with an initial contract of 4 years.

Early recordings by the orchestra included orchestral works by Vincent d'Indy (Grand Prix du Disque, 1977), and music by Rabaud and Pierné (all EMI). Later CDs included Guillou's Concerto Grosso and Concerto 2000, Ravel's Boléro and other works, and Tchaikovsky's 5th Symphony.

== Music directors ==
- Pierre Dervaux (1971–1976)
- Marc Soustrot (1976–1994)
- Hubert Soudant (1994–2004)
- Isaac Karabtchevsky (2004–2010)
- John Axelrod (2010–2013)
- Pascal Rophé (2014–2022)
- Sascha Goetzel (2022–present)
