= Besançon International Music Festival =

Coordinates: 47.24°N 6.02°E

The Besançon International Music Festival (French: Festival de musique de Besançon Franche-Comté) is one of the oldest festivals of classical music that takes place in the city of Besançon, northeastern France, over two weeks from around the middle of September. It was created in 1948.

It is particularly known for its International Besançon Competition for Young Conductors (Concours international de jeunes chefs d'orchestre) created in 1951, which is organized every two years and rewarded famous conductors such as Seiji Ozawa (1959), Michel Plasson (1962), Zdeněk Mácal (1965), Jesús López-Cobos (1968), Sylvain Cambreling (1974) or Yutaka Sado (1989), who began their international careers with its first prize. The Besançon festival is held in French.
