= List of female violinists =

This is a chronological list of female classical professional concert violinists.

Those without a known date of birth are listed separately in alphabetical order.

== Sortable list ==
Total listed: 415

Name	Alias	Birth date _{(yyyy/mm/dd)}	Birthplace	Died _{(yyyy/mm/dd)}	Place last living	Nationality	Notes
Plunkett, Catherine		1725 c.	Dublin, Ireland	1745 or later		Irish	
della Pietà, Santa	Sanza (Samaritana) della Pietà	1725–1750 c.	Venice, Italy	1775 or later	Venice, Italy	Italian	Also contralto and composer at Ospedale della Pietà / Pupil of Antonio Vivaldi
della Pietà, Anna Maria	Anna Maria della Pietà	1696	Venice, Italy	1782	Venice, Italy	Italian	Also singer, musician and composer at Ospedale della Pietà / Pupil of Antonio Vivaldi
della Pietà, Chiara	Chiara della Pietà	1718	Venice, Italy	1791	Venice, Italy	Italian	Also singer and composer at Ospedale della Pietà / Pupil of Antonio Vivaldi
Gambarini, Elisabetta	Mrs. Chazal	1730/09/07	Italy	1765/02/09	England	Italian-English	Also composer/conductor
Sirmen, Maddalena	Maddalena (Madelena) Laura Sirmen (Syrmen) b. Lombardini	1745/12/9	Venice, Italy	1818/05/18	Venice, Italy	Italian	Also composer at Ospedale della Pietà / Pupil of Giuseppe Tartini
Schmeling, Gertrude	Gertrude Elisabeth Mara / Schmehling (Schmelling, Schmaeling, Schmaehling)	1749/02/23	Kassel, Germany	1833/01/20	Reval (Tallinn), Estonia	German	Also guitarist, soprano and harpsichordist /
Bayer, Caroline	Karoline Bayer (Beyer, Beyern)	1758	Vienna, Austria	1803	Austria	Austrian	Also composer
Strinasacchi, Regina	Regina Schlick / Catarina Strinasacchi	1761/02/28	Ostiglia, Italy	1839/06/11	Dresden, Germany	Italian	Dedicatee of W. A. Mozart's Violin Sonata KV 454 /
Gautherot, Louise	M.me Louise Gautherot / b. Louise Deschamps	1763	France	1808/07/28	London	French	Pupil of Nicolas Capron /
Larrivée, Henriette	L’Arrivée (Agathe-Elisabeth) Henriette / Henriette Larrivée-Borghese	1764/11/06	Paris, France	1839/03/26	Paris, France	French	Violinist, pianist and composer / Performed in the French provinces and in London
Paravicini, Giulia	Giulia Parravicini-Albergandi	1769	Turin, Italy	1843 or later		Italian	Pupil of Giovanni Battista Viotti, Charles Philippe Lafont and Rodolphe Kreutzer /
Gerbini, Luigia	Luigia (Lugia, Luisa, Louise), Garbini (Gardini)	1770 c.	Turin, Italy	1819 or later		Italian	Pupil of Gaetano Pugnani /
Petersén, Marie Antoinette	Maria Antonia "Marie Antoinette" Petersen / b. Crux	1771	Mannheim, Germany	1855	Sweden	Swedish	violinist and singer
Gondreville, Mussier de	Magnier de Gondreville-Ladurner	1779 or earlier	France	1825/10/28	Saint-Denis, France	French	Wife of composer Ignaz Ladurner /
Filipowicz, Elisabeth	Filipowicz, Filipowitz, Elisabeth, Elise / b. Mayer, marr. Minelli	1794	Rastatt, Germany	1841/05/4	London, England	Polish	Also composer /
Krähmer, Caroline	Madame Krahmen / b. Carolina (Maria) Schleicher	1794/12/17	Stockach, Germany	1873/04/19	Vienna, Austria	German	Also clarinettist, pianist, guitarist /
Borgman, Lovisa Charlotta		1798	Götheborg, Sweden	1884	Stockholm, Sweden	Swedish	
Neumann, Eleonore	Neumann, Leonore/Eleonore/Eleonora	1819	(Lissa, Prussia) Leszno, Poland	1840/02/15	Triest, Italy	(Prussian, Russian?), Polish?, Italian, Jewish	
Milanollo, Teresa	"Mademoiselle Adagio" / (Domenica Maria) Teresa, Theresa, Therese, Milanollo-Parmentier	1827/08/28	Savigliano, Italy	1904/10/25	Paris, France	Italian	Sister of Maria Milanollo / Owned the "Milanollo-Dragonetti" Stradivari, 1728 (played by Paganini and bequeathed her by Dragonetti) and the "Milanollo-Hembert" Stradivari, 1703
Milanollo, Maria	"Mademoiselle Staccato"	1832/07/19	Savigliano, Italy	1848/10/21	Paris, France	Italian	Sister of Teresa Milanollo / Owned the small violin "Milanollo" F. Ruggieri, 1680 c.
Wendheim, Gabriele von	Wendheim, Hoffmann, Hofmann von Wendheim, Hoffmann von Wendheim, Gabriele von, Gabrielle	1835 c.	Graz, Austria	1883 or later		Austrian	Pupil of and dedicatee of Joseph Joachim's Nocturno for violin and orchestra, Op.12 (1858) /
Ferni, Vincenzina		1837 c.	Como, Italy	1926/06	Turin, Italy	Italian	Also soprano / Duo with her sister, violinist Carolina Ferni /
Blunt, Anne	Lady Ann Blunt / Anne Isabella Noel Blunt (15th Baroness Wentworth) / b. Annabella King-Noel	1837/09/22	England	1917/12/15	Cairo, Egypt	English	Owned the "Lady Blunt" Stradivari, 1721
Neruda, Wilma	Lady Hallé / b. Wilhelmine (Vilémina) Maria Franziska Neruda	1838/03/21	Brno, Austrian Empire	1911/04/15	Berlin, Germany	Czech	Pupil of Leopold Jansa /
Neruda, Maria	Madame Arlberg-Neruda / b. Anna Marie Rudolfina Neruda	1840/03/26	Brno, Austrian Empire	1920/11/07	Copenhagen, Denmark	Czech	Pupil of Leopold Jansa /
Iacovino, Mariuccia		1912/12/12	Rio de Janeiro, Brazil	2008/05/16	Rio de Janeiro, Brazil	Brazilian	Also Instructor
Ferni, Carolina		1839/02/20	Como, Italy	1926/06/04	Milan, Italy	Italian	Pupil of Jean-Delphin Alard, Charles Auguste de Bériot, Charles Dancla and Henri Vieuxtemps / Also soprano / Duo with her sister, violinist Vincenzina Ferni /
Brousil, Bertha	Brousil, Brusil, Bransil, Brousilová, Bertha	1842	Pisek, Austrian Empire	1919/11	London, England	Czech	Pupil of František Němec /
Urso, Camilla		1842/06/13	Nantes, France	1902/01/20	New York, New York US	American	
Grünner, Marie	Marie (Grünner, Grüner, Gruner) Grünner-Messerschmidt	1847	Vienna, Austria	1895/10/15	Vienna, Austria	Austrian	Cousin of composer Johann Schrammel /
Lebouys, Catherine	Catherine (Catarina, Anna, Nina, Marie-Claire) Lebouys-Waldteufel	1847	Rome, Italy	1876 or later		Italian	Pupil of Delphin Alard and Charles Auguste de Bériot/
Ferni, Virginia		1849	Turin, Italy	1934/02/04	Turin, Italy	Italian	Also soprano / Cousin of violinists Vincenzina Ferni and Carolina Ferni /
Drechsler-Hamilton, Bertha	Bertha Drechsler Adamson	1849/03/25	Edinburgh, Scotland	1934/02/04	Toronto, Canada	English	Also conductor /
Maier, Amanda	Röntgen-Maier, marr. Röntgen, Carolina Amanda Erika	1853/02/20	Landskrona, Sweden	1894/06/15	Amsterdam, Netherlands	Swedish	Also organist and composer / Wife of composer Julius Röntgen /
Liebé, Therese	Liebe, Thérèse (Jeanne Berthe)	1854/04/07	Straßburg, Austria	1897 or later	London, England	Austrian	Pupil of Teresa Milanollo /
Franko, Jeanne		1855	New Orleans, Louisiana, US	1940/12/03	New York, New York US	American	Also pianist / Pupil of Henri Vieuxtemps /
Tayau, Marie		1855/06/12	Pau, France	1892/08	Paris, France	French	Violinist and violin teacher
Brehm, Mathilde	Mathilde Brem-Heim	1856/12/03	Oberdorf, Germany	1886/03/02	Davos-Platz, Germany	German	
Scharwenka, Marianne	born Stresow	1856/02/25	Germany	1918/10/24	Berlin, Germany	German	Violinist and composer
Shattuck, Lillian		1857	Boston, Massachusetts US	1940	US	American	Student of Julius Eichberg / chamber musician / founded a women's string quartet
Bauer-Lechner, Natalie	b. Nathalie Lechner	1858/05/09	Vienna, Austria	1921/06/8	Austria	Austrian	Also violist in the Maria Soldat-Roeger String Quartet / Close friend of Gustav Mahler
Barbi, Alice	Alice Laura Barbi	1858/06/01	Modena, Italy	1948/09/04	Rome, Italy	Italian	Also mezzo-soprano
Tschetschulin, Agnes		1859/02/24	Helsinki, Finland	1942	Stockholm	Finnish	Also composer / Together with Jean Sibelius, pupil of Mitrofan Wasiljeff /
Pommereul, Marguerite	Pommereuil, Aline-Marguerite, b. Guyet, marr. Rouvier	1859/03	Saint Mihiel, France	1879 or later	France	French	Pupil of Jean-Delphin Alard /
Riley, Lucy		1861	England	1897 or later	England	English	Pupil of Joseph Joachim / From 1886, 2nd violin of the "Shinner String Quartet" (leader, Emily Shinner) /
Shinner, Emily	Emily Shinner-Liddell	1862/07/07	Cheltenham, England	1901/07/17	London, England	English	Pupil of Joseph Joachim / Leader of the "Shinner String Quartet" /
Soldat-Roeger, Maria	Marie Soldat-Röger / b. Soldat	1863/03/25	Graz, Austria	1955/09/30	Graz, Austria	Austrian	Pupil of Joseph Joachim / Played with Johannes Brahms / Owned a 'Guarnieri del Gesù', 1742
Senkrah, Arma	born Anna Loretta Harkness	1864/06/06	Williamson, New York, US	1900/09/03	Weimar, Germany	American	Student of Arno Hilf, Henryk Wieniawski and Joseph Lambert Massart / first prize at Conservatoire de Paris / successful performances throughout Europe
Osgood, Marion	Marion G. Osgood	1859/1/4	Chelsea, Massachusetts, US	1948		American	Violinist, composer and orchestral conductor / founded the all-female Marion Osgood's Ladies Orchestra
Tua, Teresina	Teresa (or Teresina, Maria Felicita) Tua / Suor Maria di Gesù	1866/04/24	Turin, Italy	1956/10/29	Rome, Italy	Italian	Pupil of Lambert Massart / / Owned the "Mond-Tua" Stradivari, 1709
Wietrowetz, Gabriela	Gabriele Wietrovitz	1866/01/13	Ljubliana, Slovenia	1937/04/06	Berlin, Germany	Italian-Slovenian	Pupil of Joseph Joachim /
Clench, Nora	Esther Leonora Clench	1867/05/06	St. Maris, Canada West	1938/05/17	Toorak, Victoria, Australia	Canadian	
Powell, Maud	Maud Powell	1867/08/22	Peru, Illinois, US	1920/01/08	Uniontown, Pennsylvania, US	American	Pupil of Joseph Joachim /
Robinson, Edith		1867/10/29	Manchester, England	1940/04/18		English	Pupil of Adolph Brodsky /
Morgan, Geraldine		1868/11/15	New York, New York US	1918	US	American	Pupil of Leopold Damrosch and Joseph Joachim /
Carpenter, Nettie	Nettie Carpenter-Stearn	1869	New York, New York US	1940 or later		American	Pupil of Pablo de Sarasate /
Rode, Mina	Minna Rode	1870 c.	Germany	1901 or later	Berlin, Germany	German	Granddaughter of Pierre Rode / Pupil of Hugo Heermann /
Becker Shaffer, Dora	b. Dora Valesca Becker	1870/03/07	Galveston, Texas, US	1958/05/19	Pennsylvania	American	Pupil of Joseph Joachim / first women to play on a musical recording in 1898 on a wax Bettini Phonograph cylinder
Folville, Juliette	Eugénie-Emilie Juliette Folville	1870/01/05	Liège, Belgium	1946/10/19	Pyrénées région, France	Belgian	Pupil of Charles Malherbe / Also pianist
Kōda, Nobu	Nobu Kōda	1870/04/19	Tokyo, Japan	1946/03/19	Tokyo, Japan	Japanese	Also pianist
Scotta, Frida	Frida von Kaulbach / born Frida Schytte	1871/03/31	Copenhagen, Denmark	1948/04/29	Ohlstadt, Germany	Danish	Student of Joseph Massart / performed in Austria, England, Germany and Russia
Speyer, Leonora	b. Leonora von Stosch / Lady Speyer	1872/11/07	Washington DC, US	1956/02/10	New York, US	American	Also poet
Mudocci, Eva	born Evangeline Hope Muddock / Rose Lynton	1872	Brixton, London, England	1953		English	Performed widely with the pianist Bella Edwards / close friend of the painter Edvard Munch
Brennerberg, Irene	Irene (Rosa) von Brennerberg	1873/03/14	Brașov, Transylvania	1922/10/01	Brașov, Romania	Romanian	Pupil of Martin Marsick /
Barns, Ethel	Ethel Barns Phillips	1874	London, England	1948/12/31	Maidenhead, England	English	Pupil of Émile Sauret / Also composer
Mead, Olive		1874	US	1946		American	Pupil of Julius Eichberg and Franz Kneisel / Founded the all-female Olive Mead Quartet
Schindler, Rosa	Róża Szyndler-Suess	1874/09/02	Gleiwitz, Oberschlesien, German Empire (Gliwice, Poland)	1925 or later	Łódź, Poland	(Prussian, Russian), Polish, Jewish	Pupil of Pablo de Sarasate and Joseph Joachim / / mother of Ilona Ralf Sues
Jackson McKim, Leonora	Leonora Jackson	1879/02/20	Boston, Massachusetts, US	1969/01/07	US	American	Pupil of Joseph Joachim /
Hood, Florence		1880/10/14	Melbourne, Australia	1968		Australian	Pupil of Hermann T. Schrader and Hans von Bülow / member of the Montreal String Quartet / concert tours and radio broadcasts in Australia
Dickenson-Auner, Mary	Dickenson-Auner, Auner, Mary (Frances Dorothée), b. Dickenson	1880/10/24	Dublin, Ireland	1965/05/25	Vienna, Austria	English	Also composer, under pseudonym of "Frank Donnell" / Pupil of Otakar Ševčík and Samuel Coleridge Taylor for composition /
Waddell, Leila	Leila (Laylah) Ida Nerissa Bathurst Waddell	1880	Bathurst, Australia	1932/09/14	Sydney, Australia	Australian	Pupil of Leopold Auer /
Clarke, Rachel Steinman		c. 1882	Włocławek, Poland	1944/11/04	Miami, Florida US	Polish-American	Student of Jacques Thibaud / toured the US as a violinist and as head of the Rachel Steinman Concert Company / educator
Hegner, Anna		1881/03/01	Basel, Switzerland	1963/02/03	Basel, Switzerland	Swiss	soloist appearing in concerts in Basel, Berlin, Leipzig and London
Bartlett, Floy Little		1883/03/07	Burlington, Iowa US	1956/03/07	Burlington, Iowa	American	Studied violin in Paris / accompanist and soprano singer / writer
Fonaroff, Vera		1883/06/14	Kyiv, Ukraine	1962/07/23	New York, New York US	American	soloist, recitalist, chamber musician and educator
Hall, Marie	Marie Pauline Hall	1884/04/08	Newcastle upon Tyne, England	1956/11/11	Cheltenham, England	English	Pupil of Otakar Ševčík / Dedicatee of Ralph Vaughan Williams's The Lark Ascending (1920)
Pászthory, Pálma von		1884/05/23	Budapest, Hungary	1958	Weilheim/Oberbayern, Germany	Hungarian	
Bell Collier, Bessie		1885/04/03	Cohasset, Massachusetts, US	1969/04/04	Massachusetts, US	American	Student of Franz Kneisel / soloist with various orchestras performed benefit concerts during World War I
Hayward, Marjorie	Marjorie Olive Hayward	1885/08/14	Greenwich, England	1953/01/10	London, England	English	Pupil of Émile Sauret and Otakar Ševčík / 1st violin, leader of the Virtuoso String Quartet,
Luboshutz, Lea		1885/02/22	Odesa, Ukraine	1965/03/18	Odesa, Ukraine	Russian	Child prodigy / pupil of Emil Młynarski / chamber musician / toured widely in Europe and the US
Fachiri, Adila		1886/02/26	Budapest, Hungary	1962/12/15	London, England	Hungarian	Sister of violinist Jelly d'Arányi / Dedicatee, with her sister Jelly d'Arányi, of Gustav Holst's Double Concerto for 2 Violins Op.49 (1929)
Jourdan-Morhange, Hélène		1888/01/30	France	1961/05/15	Paris, France	French	Dedicatee of Maurice Ravel's Violin Sonata (1927)
Geyer, Stefi	Stefy Geyer	1888/06/28	Budapest, Hungary	1956/12/11	Zürich, Switzerland	Hungarian	Pupil of Jenő Hubay, 1902 / Dedicatee of Béla Bartók Violin Concerto No. 1 (1907–08) and Othmar Schoeck Violin Concerto Op.21 (1912) /
Stillings, Kemp	Katharine Kemp Stillings	1888/06/30	Roxbury, Massachusetts, US	1967/04/30	New York City, US	American	Pupil of Joseph Joachim and Leopold Auer / Performed in Russian and Finland before World War I / after becoming blind in 1920s, concentrated on teaching
Breittmayer, Maggy		1888/09/02	Geneva, Switzerland	1961/05/06	Geneva, Switzerland	Swiss	Pupil of Carl Flesch / Performed in Europe before World War I / teacher at Geneva Conservatory
Southgate, Elsie	Miss Elsie Southgate "The Royal Violinist"	1880/1/23	London, England	1946/05/05	London, England	English	
Chemet, Renée	Renée Henriette Joséphine Chemet	1887/01/09	Boulogne-sur-Seine, France	1977/01/02	Paris, France	French	Leading international soloist for decades / recording artist and broadcaster
Azpiroz, Marie		1889/11/27	Madrid, Spain	after 1919	Los Angeles, US	Spanish	Performed in Cuba, Mexico, South America and the United States / educator
Viëtor, Alba Rosa		1889/07/18	Milan, Italy	1979/04/15	US	Scottish	Pupil of César Thomson and Otakar Ševčík / violinist and composer
Cullen, Jenny		1890	Scotland	1957		Scottish	Pupil of Henri Verbrugghen / concert master of the State Symphony Orchestra of Sydney / first female member of the Minneapolis Symphony Orchestra
Parlow, Kathleen		1890/09/20	Fort Calgary, Alberta, Canada	1963/08/19	Toronto, Ontario, Canada	Canadian	Pupil of Leopold Auer
Breuning-Storm, Gunna		1891/01/25	Copenhagen, Denmark	1966/04/24	Copenhagen, Denmark	Danish	Pupil of Johannes Schiørrin, Torben Anton Svendsen and Henri Marteau / performed as a soloist in German cities and played for Empress Augusta Viktoria / founded her own chamber orchestra and played in the Breuning-Bache Quartet
Lincoln Kerr, Louise		1892/04/24	Cleveland, Ohio, US	1977/12/10	Cottonwood, Arizona, US	American	Violinist, violist and composer / performed with the Pasadena Symphony / studied with Stravinsky and Prokofiev
d'Arányi, Jelly		1893/05/30	Budapest, Hungary	1966/03/30		Hungarian	Pupil of Jenő Hubay / concert tours in Europe and America / chamber trio with Pablo Casals
Canales, Marta		1893/06/17	Santiago, Chile	1986/12/06		Chilean	founded chamber ensemble / worked later as a composer and conductor
Burrows, Grace		1893/06/29	Leicester, England	1980		English	played viola in The Birmingham Quartet / founding leader of the Leicester Symphony Orchestra
Chartres, Vivien	Vivian Chartres, Vivien Vivanti-Chartres, Vivien Chartres Burns, Vivien (Chartres) Young	1893/06/25	Turin, Italy	1941/09/01	Hove Sussex, England	English	Pupil of Otakar Ševčík / She owned an "Alessandro Gagliano" violin
Evrard, Jane	Jeanne Chevallier	1893/02/05	Neuilly-Plaisance	1985/11/04	Paris, France	French	Pupil of M. Lefort / founded and conducted the all-women Orchestre féminin de Paris
Kennedy, Daisy	Daisy Fowler Kennedy	1893/01/16	Burra, South Australia, Australia	1981/07/30	Hammersmith, London, England	Australian-English	Pupil of Otakar Ševčík / Wife of pianist Benno Moiseiwitsch (1914–24) /
Menges, Isolde	Isolde Marie Menges	1893/05/16	Sussex, England	1976/01/13	London, England	English	Pupil of Leopold Auer and Carl Flesch / Sister of composer, conductor Herbert Menges / English première in 1923 of Ernő Dohnányi's Violin Concerto No.1 Op.27 (1915) / Leader of the Menges String Quartet, founded in 1931 /
Arányi, Jelly d'	Jelly Aranyi de Hunyadvár	1893/05/30	Budapest, Hungary	1966/03/30	Firenze, Italy	Hungarian	Pupil of Jenő Hubay, 1908 / Sister of violinist Adila Fachiri, niece of Joseph Joachim / Owned the "Lord Dunn-Raven" Stradivari, 1710 / Dedicatee of Béla Bartók's Violin Sonatas No.1 Sz.75 (1921) & No.2 Sz.76 (1922), Maurice Ravel's Tzigane (1924) and, with her sister Adila Fachiri, of Gustav Holst's Double Concerto for 2 Violins Op.49 (1929)
Healy, Gertrude		1894/03/18	Ballarat, Victoria, Australia	1984/10/6	Ballarat, Victoria, Australia	Australian	Concert violinist, taught at Albert Street Conservatorium of Music, and conducted the chamber orchestra.
Barstow, Vera	Miss Vera Barstow	1895	Pasadena, California, US	196?	US	American	Pupil of Luigi von Kunits / Premiered Leo Ornstein's Violin Sonata Op.26 (1915) / / Premiered Charles Wakefield Cadman's Violin Sonata in G major (1930) / Played the "Giovan Battista Guadagnini", 1745
Rudge, Olga		1895/04/13	US	1985/03/15	Venice, Los Angeles, California US	American	Concert violinist / performed in Italy with Ildebrando Pizzetti / mistress of the poet Ezra Pound
Andjelkovitch, Eileen	Eileen Constance Smith, Eileen Russell Worby, Eileen C. Tcherniak, Eileen C. Cathie	1896-03-18	Ireland	1941-10-15	Worthing, U.K.	British	violinist, musical director, and music educator based in London; made recordings
Given, Thelma		1896	US	1977		American	
Stevens, Cecile	Cecile Ann Stevens, Cecile Molloy	1896	Sydney, Australia			Australian	Child musician, won scholarship to study at Royal Academy of Music; toured internationally in 1920s; lived in East Africa after marriage
Stolofsky, Irene	Irene Stolofsky Davis	1896/07/28	Chicago, Illinois US	1950/07/28		American	Student of Hugh (Harry) Dimond / Toured US and Canada in the 1920s / member of Bohumir Kryl's Orchestral Sextette / educator
Moodie, Alma	Alma Templeton Moodie	1898/09/12	Rockhampton, Australia	1943/03/7	Frankfurt, Germany	Australian	Pupil of César Thomson / No recordings exist
Merrill Warren, Winifred		1898/06/24	Atlanta, Georgia US	1990/03/11	Illinois	American	Soloist with the Minneapolis Symphony Orchestra / formed the Indiana University Trio / educator
Eckhardt-Gramatté, Sophie Carmen	b. Sofia (Sonia) Fridman-Kochevskaya	1899/01/06	Moscow, Russia	1974/12/02	Stuttgart, Germany	Canadian	Composer and virtuoso pianist and violinist.
Dubiska, Irena		1899/09/26	Inowrocław, Poland	1990/06/01	Warsaw, Poland	Polish	Pupil of Bronislaw Huberman and Carl Flesch /
Harrison, Margaret		1899	Chatham, England	1965/12/24	Limpsfield, England	English	Pupil of Achille Rivarde from the age of 5 / performed Delius works with her sisters
Sampigny, Hortense de	Hortense de Sampigny-Bailly	189?	France	1970	France	French	Member of Trio Trillat / Dedicatee of Bohuslav Martinů's Violin Sonata No.2 (1931)
Ferrari, Albertina	Alberta Lovrich or Lovrič	1900	Zara-Zadar, Austro-Hungary (now Croatia)	1986	Trieste, Italy	Italian	Pupil of Jenő Hubay, 1924 / Founder of Trio di Milano, 1932 / Mother of Giorgio Strehler (1921–1997), Italian director /
Wegener, Emmy	Emmy Heil Frensel-Wegener	1901/06/14	Amsterdam, Netherlands	1973/01/11	Laren, Netherlands	Dutch	Violinist, pianist, poet and composer
Fehér, Ilona	Ilona Feher	1901/12/3	Budapest, Hungary	1988/01	Holon, Israel	Hungarian	Pupil of Jenő Hubay, 1920
Hribar, Vida Jeraj		1902/05/04	Vienna, Austria	2002/05/06	Ljubljana, Slovenia	Slovenian	Violinist and music educator
Welge, Gladys		1902/05/23	Austin, Illinois	1976/07/27	California, US	American	Violinist and conductor / conductor of the Women's Symphony Orchestra of Chicago / educator
Rubinstein, Erna	Erna Rubenstein	1903/03/3	Nagyszeben (Sibiu), Hungary	[?]1966	Pittsburgh, Pennsylvania, US	Hungarian	Pupil of Jenő Hubay, 1918 / New protégée of Willem Mengelberg / / On August 13, 1945, she divorced from screenwriter George Bruce / Owned the "Gudgeon" Stradivari, 1672
Kramer, Tosca	Dr. Tosca Berger Kramer	1903/06/17	New Zealand	1976/12/27	Tulsa, Oklahoma, US	American	Pupil of Eugène Ysaÿe
Wilson, Marie		1903/11/30	Epping Forest, England	1959	London, England	English	
Morini, Erika	Erica Morini	1904/01/5	Vienna, Austria	1995/10/31	New York, US	Austrian-American	Pupil of Otakar Ševčík
Kersey, Eda		1904/05/16	Goodmayes, Essex	1944/07/13	London, England	English	
Delbos, Claire	Louise Justine Delbos	1906/11/02	Paris, France	1959/04/22	Hauts-de-Seine, France	French	Studied at Paris Conservatoire / recitals with her composer husband Olivier Messiaen
Rosé, Alma	Alma Rosé b. Rosenblum	1906/11/3	Vienna, Austria	1944/04/4	Auschwitz	Austrian	Daughter of Arnold Rosé / Wife of Váša Příhoda / Director of the "Women's Orchestra" at Auschwitz
De Vito, Gioconda	Gioconda Anna Clelia De Vito	1907/07/27	Martina Franca, Italy	1994/10/24	Rome, Italy	Italian	
Macnaghten, Anne		1908/08/09	Northern Ireland	2000/12/31		English	Pupil of Jelly d'Arányi and Walther Davisson / founded the all-female Macnaghten String Quartet and the New Macnaghten Concerts
Bacewicz, Grażyna	Grazyna Bacewicz	1909/02/5	Łódź, Poland	1969/01/19	Warsaw, Poland	Polish	Pupil of Carl Flesch / Also composer
Fulton, Marjorie	Marjorie Harrell / b. Marjorie McAllister Fulton	1909/12/28	Oklahoma City, Oklahoma US	1962/11/3	Dallas, Texas, US	American	Mother of cellist Lynn Harrell
Umińska, Eugenia		1910/10/4	Warsaw, Poland	1980/11/20	Kraków, Poland	Polish	
Barinova, Galina	Galina Vsevolodovna Barinova	1910/10/7	Saint Petersburg, Russia	2006/09/20	Leningrad, Russia	Russian	Pupil of Jacques Thibaud /
Stark, Ethel		1911/08/25	Montreal, Canada	2012/02/16	Montreal, Canada	Canadian	Violinist and conductor / founded and conducted the Montreal Women's Symphony Orchestra / educator
Pashkus, Alice		1911/02/21	Germany	1972/02/3	Vienna, Austria	German	
Ignatius, Anja	Anja Hirvensalo	1911/06/2	Tampere, Finland	1995/04/10	Helsinki, Finland	Finnish	
Kaye, Evelyn	Evelyn / Evelyn Kaye Klein (a.k.a. Evelyn Silverstone)	1911/10/19	US	1990/06/8	US	American	violinist and actress / played with the 'All-Girl Orchestra' of her husband Phil Spitalny /
Carmirelli, Pina		1914/01/23	Varzi, Italy	1993/02/26	Capena, Italy	Italian	Pupil of Michelangelo Abbado / Owned three violins by "Marino Capicchioni", 1941, 1954 and 1956
Shapiro, Eudice		1914/02/25	Buffalo, NY US	2007/09/17	Los Angeles, California, US	American	
Lidka, Maria	Marianne Louise Liedtke	1914/05/27	Berlin, Germany	2013/12/12	London, England	British	Pupil of Josef Wolfsthal and Max Rostal / In 1934 she moved to London / In 1952 she premiered Peter Racine Fricker Violin Concerto No.1 / In 1955 she acquired the 1734 "Willemotte" Stradivarius /
Posselt, Ruth	Ruth Pierce Posselt	1914/09/6	Medford, Massachusetts, US	2007/02/19	New York, US	American	Pupil of Emanuel Ondříček / Wife of Richard Burgin (Auer pupil) who was concertmaster of the BSO for many years under Serge Koussevitzky.
Lephay-Belthoise, Yvonne		1914/09/27	Dieppe, France	2011/11/17		French	Pupil of Jules Boucherit / orchestral violinist and recitalist touring for the Alliance Française
Field, Joan		1915/04/28	Long Branch, New Jersey, US	1988/03/18	Miami Beach, Florida, US	American	Pupil of Franz Kneisel, Albert Spalding, Michel Piastro, Marcel Chailley, Jacques Thibaud and George Enescu
Dunicz-Niwińska, Helena		1915/07/28	Vienna, Austria	2018/06/12	Krakow, Poland	Polish	Performed in the Auschwitz orchestra
Devries, Gabrielle	b. Gabrielle Rossi	1915/10/19	Nice, France	2001/11/04	Colombes (Hauts-de-Seine), France	French	Pupil of Marcel Reynal and Gabriel Bouillon / Wife of the composer Ivan Devries (1909–1997) / Obituary and short bio (in French) www.musimem.com /
Bustabo, Guila	b. Teressina Bustabo	1916/02/25	Manitowoc, Wisconsin, US	2002/04/27	Birmingham, Alabama, US	American	Dedicatee of Ermanno Wolf-Ferrari's Violin Concerto Op.26 (1944) and Otmar Nussio's Violin Concerto (1959)
Zorian, Olive		1916	Manchester, England	1965		English	Founder of the Zorian Quartet
Behrend, Louise		1916/10/3	Washington, DC, US	2011/08/3	New York, US	American	Pupil of Louis Persinger /
Hendrickson, Lyndall		1917	b. Balaklava (South Australia)	2017/07/22	Adelaide, Australia	Australian	Pupil of Ludwik Schwab/Renowned violin pedagogue / Member of AUSTA /
DeLay, Dorothy		1917/03/31	Medicine Lodge, Kansas, US	2002/03/24	New York, US	American	Pupil of Ivan Galamian
Canberg, Mary		1918	Grand Rapids, Michigan, US	2004/06/15	West Nyack, New York, US	American	Pupil of Ivan Galamian
Gründer, Anne-Marie	Anne-Marie Gründer	1918/05/17	Chexbres, Switzerland	1996/11/22	Berne, Switzerland	Swiss	Pupil of Carl Flesch / 2nd prize Geneva International Music Competition, 1944 /
Glenn, Carroll	Elizabeth Carroll Glenn	1918/10/28	Richmond, Virginia, US	1983/04/25	New York, US	American	Pupil of Édouard Dethier / Wife and Duo partner of pianist Eugene List
Rapaport, Rosemary	Nancy Rosemary Peace Rapaport	1918/03/19	St Albans, England	2011/06/08	Olney, England	English	Pupil of Rowsby Woof and Frederick Grinke / member of the Halle Orchestra / founded the Purcell School for musically gifted children
Luzzato, Wanda	Wanda Luzzato, b. Carpi	1919/06/19	Varese, Italy	2002/09/25	Milan, Italy	Italian	Pupil of Jenő Hubay, 1935 / Dedicatee of Giorgio Federico Ghedini's Divertimento in D major, for Violin and Orchestra (1959/60) /
Neveu, Ginette		1919/08/11	Paris, France	1949/10/28	Azores, Portugal	French	1st prize Henryk Wieniawski Violin Competition, 1935
Gilels, Elizabeth	Elizaveta / Yelizaveta Gilels	1919/09/30	Odesa, Ukraine, USSR	2008/03/13	Moscow, Russia	Russian	Pupil of Pyotr Stolyarsky, Abram Yampolsky and Miron Polyakin/ Sister of Emil Gilels, wife of Leonid Kogan
Suwa, Nejiko	b. Nejiko Oga	1920/01/23	Tokyo, Japan	2012/03/6	Tokyo, Japan	Japanese	Pupil of Anna Bubnova-Ono /
Tuttle, Karen		1920/03/28	Lewiston, Idaho, US	2010/12/16		American	Switched to viola; Pupil of William Primrose /
Pardee, Margaret		1920/05/10	Valdosta, Georgia, US	2016/01/26	Westbury, New York, US	American	Pupil of Ivan Galamian, Sascha Jacobsen, Albert Spalding, and Louis Persinger
Havas, Kató		1920/11/05	Târgu Secuiesc, Romania (Transylvania/Hungary)	2018/12/31	London	Hungarian-British	Pedagogue
Lengyel, Gabrielle	Gabriella / Gaby Lengyel	1920/11/20	Budapest, Hungary	1993/03/22	Paris	Hungarian-French	the last pupil of Jenő Hubay / studied with Ede Zathureczky / awards: "Eduard Rémenyi Prize" (Budapest, 1934); 2nd "Vienna Competition" (Vienna, 1937); 2nd "International Long-Thibaud Competition" (Paris, 1946); Hungarian National "Pro Arte" medal (Budapest, 1947); Grand Prix "Carl Flesch Competition" (London, 1948) / she performed in Duo with her brother Attila (Atty Lengyel) and founded the Trio Lengyel (with Atty, piano and Endre Lengyel, cello)
Stucki, Aida		1921/02/19	Cairo, Egypt	2011/06/9	Winterthur, Switzerland	Swiss	
Bobesco, Lola	Lola Violeta Ana-Maria Bobesco (Bobescu)	1921/08/9	Craiova, Romania	2003/09/4	Spa, Belgium	Romanian	
Solovieff, Miriam		1921/11/04	San Francisco, California, US	2004/03/04	Paris, France	American	Pupil of Louis Persinger and Carl Flesch / solo violinist and pianist; played at the Hollywood Bowl
Lack, Fredell		1922/02/19	Tulsa, Oklahoma, US	2017/08/20	Houston, Texas, US	American	Noted concert soloist, recording artist, chamber musician, and prolific teacher. Owner of "Baron Deurbroucq" Antonio Stradivari, 1727. Her bow: François Tourte.
Lama, Lina		1922/04/22	Faenza, Italy	2014/11/28	Rome, Italy	Italian	violinist and violist
Pegreffi, Elisa		1922/06/10	Genova, Italy	2016/01/14	Reggio Emilia, Italy	Italian	Pupil of Arrigo Serato / Wife of Paolo Borciani and 2nd violin of Quartetto Italiano, / Owns two violins by "Marino Capicchioni", 1942 and 1943
Liivak, Evi		1924	Viljandi, Estonia	1996	New York, New York US	Estonian-American	Pupil of Ede Zathureczky and Max Strub / in 1962 she acquired the "Lipiński" Stradivarius, 1715 /
Ajemian, Anahid		1924/01/26	Brooklyn, New York, US	2016/06/13	New York, US	American	Pupil of Edouard Dethier / in 1960s founded the Composers String Quartet.
Gilels, Zinaida	Zinaida Grigoryevna Gilels	1924/02/24	Odesa, Ukraine, USSR	2000/05/07	US	Soviet-American	Pupil of Pyotr Stolyarsky, Abram Yampolsky and David Oistrakh / Niece of Elizabeth Gilels and Emil Gilels
Van Dyke, Marcia		1924/03/26	US	2002/09/03	US	American	
Hall, Doreen		1924/05/24	County Down, Northern Ireland	2025/01/19	Toronto, Canada	Canadian	
Martzy, Johanna		1924/10/26	Timișoara, Transylvania	1979/08/13	Glarus, Switzerland	Hungarian	Pupil of Jenö Hubay / 2nd prize Geneva International Music Competition, 1947 /
Auclair, Michèle		1924/11/16	Paris, France	2005/06/10	Paris, France	French	Pupil of Jules Boucherit, Boris Kamensky and Jacques Thibaud / 1st prize Long-Thibaud Competition, 1943 / 1st prize Geneva International Music Competition, 1945 /
Glezarova, Maya		1924/12/10	Russia	2017/07/17	Moscow, Russia	Russian	Russian violin professor, pupil and assistant of Yuri Yankelevich /
Cserfalvi, Elisabeth	Elise Cserfalvi	1926	Budapest, Hungary	1970s ?	London	Hungarian	Pupil of Ede Zathureczky / 2nd prize Geneva International Music Competition, 1946 / 3rd Prize Queen Elisabeth Music Competition, 1951 / Played at "BBC Proms" in 1960, 1961 and 1964 / Her Duo partner was pianist Géza Frid / Wife of Árpád Gérecz.
Mari, Iwamoto	Marry Esther	1927/01/19	Japan	1979/05/11	Tokyo, Japan	Japanese	Pupil of Anna Bubnova-Ono and Louis Persinger /
Liddell, Nona		1927/06/09	Ealing, London, England	2017/04/13		English	Pupil of Rowsby Woof / soloist, leader of chamber music ensembles and educator
Kaverzneva, Olga	Olga Viktorovna Kaverzneva	1926/05/12	Odesa, USSR	2006/12/25	Moscow, Russia	Russian	Pupil of Benjamin Z. Mordkovich and David Oistrach
Tsitsikian, Anahit	Anahit Tsitsikyan	1926/08/26	Leningrad, USSR	1999/05/2	Yerevan, Armenia	Armenian	
Zerounian, Ara		1926/11/26	Detroit, Michigan, US	2012/10/29	Ridgefield, Connecticut, US	American-Armenian	
Monosoff, Sonya		1927	US	living		American	Pupil of Louis Persinger / Pioneer of baroque violin /
Hidy, Marta		1927/01/11	Budapest, Hungary	2010/11/4	Hamilton, Canada	Hungarian Canadian	Pupil of Ede Zathureczky, Leo Weiner and Zoltán Kodály / 1st prize Franz Liszt Academy's Remenyi Competition, 1943 / Award Henryk Wieniawski Violin Competition, 1952 /
Kwalwasser, Helen		1927/10	US	2017	US	American	Pupil of Efrem Zimbalist, Sr. and Ivan Galamian / Violin pedagogue
Travers, Patricia		1927/12/5	Clifton, New Jersey, US	2010/02/9	Clifton, New Jersey, US	American	Played the "Tom Taylor" Stradivarius, 1732 / After 1951 she quit performing concerts
Parkhomenko, Olha	Olha Parkhomenko	1928/04/7	Kyiv, Ukraine, USSR	2011/06/5	USSR	Ukrainian	Pupil of David Oistrakh / 3rd prize ex-aequo Henryk Wieniawski Violin Competition, 1952
Berkovich, Klara	Klara Yefimovna Berkovich / b. Klara Gordion	1928/05/19	Odesa, Ukraine, USSR	living	Baltimore, Maryland, US	Russian-American	
Kimber, Beryl		1928/06/03	Perth, Australia	2022/11/25	Sydney, Australia	Australian	Pupil of David Oistrakh / Distinction prize at 1st Tchaikovsky International Competition, 1958 /
Leonhardt, Marie	b. Marie Amsler	1928/11/06	Netherlands	2022/07/23	Amsterdam	Dutch	Baroque violin / Pupil of Max Rostal / Wife of Gustav Leonhardt
Nelli Shkolnikova	Nelly Chkolnikova / Nelli Efimovna Shkolnikova	1928/07/8	Zolotonosha, Ukraine, USSR	2010/02/2	Melbourne, Australia	Russian	Pupil of Yuri Yankelevich / 1st great prize Long-Thibaud Competition, 1953
Wicks, Camilla	Camilla Dolores Wicks	1928/08/9	Long Beach, California, US	living		American-Norwegian	
Haendel, Ida		1928/12/15	Chelm, Poland	2020/07/1	London, England	English	Pupil of Carl Flesch and George Enescu / 7th prize Henryk Wieniawski Violin Competition, 1935
Hodgkins, Claire		1929	Portland, Oregon, US	2011	Thousand Oaks, California, US	American	Pupil of Jascha Heifetz / international violinist, educator, chamber musician, and founder of the Jascha Heifetz Society
Barbara Penny		1929		2007		British	The first woman to play in the strings section of the Royal Philharmonic Orchestra
Wiłkomirska, Wanda	Wanda Wilkomirska	1929/01/11	Warsaw, Poland	2018/05/01	Australia	Polish	2nd prize (ex-aequo) Henryk Wieniawski Violin Competition, 1952 / Member or the "Wilkomirski-Trio" (Kazimierz Wilkomirski (piano), Maria (cello) & Wanda Wilkomirska) / Plays a 1734 violin by Pietro Guarneri, Venice.
Fain, Rosa	Roza Fajn	1929/01/19	Odesa, Ukraine, USSR	2025/02/10		Russian	Pupil of David Oistrakh / 1st prize Henryk Wieniawski Violin Competition, 1957
Elphège, Flora		1930s ?	Grénoble, France	living ?	Grénoble, France	French	Renowned violin pedagogue / 2nd prize Geneva International Music Competition, 1954 / / Piano Trio: Jean Martin (piano), Flora Elphège (violin), Claude Burgos (cello) /
Steiner, Diana		1932	US	living	US	American	sister of cellist and conductor Frances Steiner /
Varga, Norma	b. Norma Jones	1936	England	deceased 2012	US	English	Pupil of Isolde Menges / Wife of violinist Ruben Varga (1928–1984) / Mother of violinist Rachel Varga / Mother of composer David Varga /
Givskov, Tutter	Tutter Ellen Margrethe Givskov	1930/04/30	Copenhagen, Denmark	living		Danish	Pupil of Thorvald Nielsen and Erling Bloch / leader of the Tivoli Symphony Orchestra / founder of the Copenhagen String Quartet
Harnoncourt, Alice	b. Alice Hoffelner	1930/09/26	Vienna, Austria	living	Vienna	Austrian	Baroque violin / Wife of Nikolaus Harnoncourt
Hagen, Betty-Jean	Betty-Jeanne Hagen	1930/10/17	Edmonton, Canada	2016/12/29		Canadian	Pupil of Ludwig Becker and Ivan Galamian / 3rd Grand Prix Concours-Long-Thibaud, 1951 (when Ivry Gitlis was 5th) /
Paetsch, Priscilla	Priscilla McClure Johnson Paetsch	1931/11/18	Evanston, Illinois, US	2017/07/19	Colorado Springs, US	American	Violinist, violist, chamber musician and educator
Theuveny, Marie Claude	Marie-Claude Theuveny-Petit	1931	Paris, France	2012/07/23	Paris, France	French	2nd prize Geneva International Music Competition, 1948 /
Schneidermann, Dina		1931?	Odesa, Ukraine	2016/08/09	Uppsala, Sweden	Ukrainian-Bulgarian-Swedish	Pupil of David Oistrakh / 2nd prize Geneva International Music Competition, 1960 / Played Paganini's "Il Cannone" by Giuseppe Guarneri del Gesù, 1743
Fernández, Huguette	Fernandez Huguette / b. Delsol	1932	Spain	2012/12/10	Decazeville, France	French	2nd prize Geneva International Music Competition, 1950 / Till 1969, concertmaster of the Orchestre de chambre Jean-François Paillard /
Lautenbacher, Susanne	Suzanne or Susi Lautenbacher	1932/04/19	Augsburg, Germany	living		German	Pupil of Karl Freund and Henryk Szeryng (briefly)
Garnier, Liliane		1932/09/13	Dijon, France	living		French	
Yashvili, Marina	Jasvili (Iashvili) Marine Luarsabovna	1932/10/2	Tbilisi, Georgia, USSR	2012/07/9	Moscow, Russia	Russian	Pupil of Konstantin Mostras / 3rd prize ex-aequo Henryk Wieniawski Violin Competition, 1952 /
Berkova, Sandra	Saundra Berkova / b. Maazel / Sandra Macaulay	1933	Los Angeles, California, US	1978/01/11	Los Angeles, California US	American	Daughter of violinist Frances Berkova / Cousin of conductor Lorin Maazel /
Tarjus, Blanche		1933	France	1990	France	French	Pupil of René Benedetti, George Enescu and Alice Pashkus / 3rd prize ex-aequo Henryk Wieniawski Violin Competition, 1952 / 2nd prize Geneva International Music Competition, 1952 / 2nd prize ex-aequo 'Concours Marguerite Long-Jacques Thibaud', 1953 /
Spirk, Margit		1933/04/12	Trento, Italy	living		Italian	Pupil of Sandor Vegh and Váša Příhoda /
Bagdasarjanz, Ursula		1934	Winterthur, Switzerland	living		Swiss	Pupil of Aida Stucki, Marcel Reynal, Sándor Végh, Joseph Calvet and Max Rostal
Erduran, Ayla		1934/09/22	Istanbul, Turkey	2025/01/07		Turkish	Pupil of Karl Berger, Ivan Galamian, Zino Francescatti, David Oistrakh / 5th prize Henryk Wieniawski Violin Competition, 1957 / iKSV 2007 Award
Ruppert, Christa	Christa Ruppert Leira	1935/04/02	Frankfurt, Germany	2010/05/06	Cascais, Portugal	German-Portuguese	Pupil of Ricardo Odnoposoff and Oskar Back / concert soloist in various European cities / in Lisbon, concertmaster of the National Radio Orchestra
Kaliszewska, Jadwiga		1936	Warsaw, Poland	2012	Poznań, Poland	Russian	Pupil of Eugenia Umińska / Award Henryk Wieniawski Violin Competition, 1962
Kan, Suna		1936/10/21	Adana, Turkey	2023/06/11		Turkish	
Beilina, Nina	Nina Michailowna Beilina / Nina Beilina-Chudnovsky	1937	Odesa, Ukraine, USSR	2018	New York, US	Russian-American	Pupil of Abram Yampolsky and David Oistrakh / Dedicatee of Alfred Schnittke Suite in the Old Style (1972) and Boris Tischenko Violin Fantasy, Op.118 (1994) /
Kaine, Carmel		1937/03/22	Wagga Wagga, New South Wales, Australia	2013/04/21		Australian	Pupil of Ivan Galamian / soloist and chamber musician / recording artist and educator
Peinemann, Edith		1937/03/3	Mainz, Germany	living		German	Pupil of Max Rostal
Vamos, Almita		1938	US	living		American	Wife of violin pedagogue Roland Vamos
Petrosyan, Zoya	Isabella Petrosian	1939	Russia	living		Russian	Pupil of David Oistrakh / 4th prize Henryk Wieniawski Violin Competition, 1962
Gotkovsky, Nell		1939/09/26	Paris, France	1997/07/15	Brigham, Utah, US	French	
Givens, Shirley		1940s ?	Louisville, Kentucky US	living	New York, New York US	American	Pupil of Ivan Galamian / Renowned violin pedagogue at Juilliard School / Wife of cellist/conductor Harry Wimmer /
Kuronuma, Yuriko		1940/06/04	Tokyo, Japan	living		Japanese	Award-winning Japanese violinist
Le Dizès, Maryvonne		1940	France	2024	Paris, France	French	1st prize Paganini Competition, 1962 / Active with Ensemble Intercontemporain /
Lozada, Carmencita		1940	Manila, Philippines	2006/08/15	Pasig, Philippines	Filipino	Pupil of Ricardo Odnoposoff in Salzburg; after graduating from the Music School in Vienna, she moved in The Netherlands and there took up residence in Jan.1964. In 1975 she moved to Germany, and in the span of 30 years she performed in Europe, United States, Canada and Asia. Prizes at Paganini Competition: 4th ex aequo, 1956; 2nd ex aequo, 1961 /
Yu Lina		1940	Nigbo, China	living		Chinese	Soloist and educator
Brown, Iona		1941/01/07	Salisbury, England	2004/06/05	Salisbury, England	English	Concertmaster and Music Director of the Academy of St. Martin in the Fields, the Norwegian Chamber Orchestra and the Los Angeles Chamber Orchestra
Ushioda, Masuko		1942/04/04	Shenyang, Manchuria	2013/05/28	Boston, Massachusetts US	Japanese	
Alsted, Birgitte		1942/06/15	Odense, Denmark	living		Danish	Educated at Royal Danish Academy of Music / violinist in Danish National Symphony Orchestra
Abel, Jenny		1942/11/13	Bredstedt, Kreis Husum, Germany	living		German	Pupil of Max Rostal and Henryk Szeryng / Duo with pianist Roberto Szidon /
Armstrong, Helen		1943/08/09	Rockford, Illinois, US	2006/04/28	Greenwich, Connecticut, US	American	Pupil of Ivan Galamian
Perenyi, Eszter		1943/12/15	Budapest, Hungary	living		Hungarian	Classical violinist and educator
Spitzner, Renate		1943/05/28	Prague, Czechoslovakia	living	Vienna, Austria	Austrian	Violinist, composer, educator / founder of the Music-social Method
Nishizaki, Takako		1944/04/14	Japan	living	Hong Kong	Japanese	Pupil of Joseph Fuchs / Spouse of Klaus Heymann, "Naxos" label owner
Mordkovitch, Lydia	b. Lydia Shtimerman	1944/04/30	Saratov, Russia	2014/12/09	London, England	Russian-British	Pupil of David Oistrakh / 5th prize Long-Thibaud Competition, 1969
Eggebrecht, Renate		1944/08/12	Selent, Schleswig-Holstein, Germany	living		German	
Chumachenco, Ana	Chumachenko	1945/06/23	Padova, Italy	living		Italian-German	Studied with Ljerko Spiller, Yehudi Menuhin, Joseph Szigeti. Sandor Vegh / Teaches at the "Kronberg Academy"
Lara, Catherine	born Catherine Bodet	1945/05/17	Poissy, France	living		French	originally classical violinist and chamber musician / established the Lara Quartet / now mainly neo-classical, rock and pop
Milanova, Stoika		1945/08/05	Plovdiv, Bulgaria	living		Bulgarian	Pupil of David Oistrakh / 2nd prize in the Queen Elisabeth Competition, 1967
Dael, Lucy van		1946	Amsterdam, Netherlands	living		Dutch	Baroque violin
Grindenko, Tatiana	Tatjana Grindenko	1946/03/29	Kharkiv, Ukraine, URSS	living		Russian	1st prize Henryk Wieniawski Violin Competition, 1972
Isakadze, Liana		1946/08/02	Tbilisi, Georgia	living		Georgian	
Fried, Miriam		1946/09/09	Satu Mare, Romania	living		Israeli	Pupil of Alice Fenyves, Josef Gingold and Ivan Galamian / 1st prize Paganini Competition, 1968; 1st Prize Grand prix international Reine Elisabeth, 1971
Banchini, Chiara		1946/10/07	Lugano, Switzerland	living		Swiss	Baroque violin
Shiokawa, Yūko		1946/06/01	Tokyo, Japan	living		Japanese	Student of Eugen Cremer / International soloist with major orchestras / chamber musician and recitalist
Kakudo, Kaoru		1947	Japan	2004/04/05	Rotterdam, Netherlands	Japanese	Pupil of Ivan Galamian / Also concertmaster of the Rotterdam Philharmonic Orchestra
Spitková, Jela		1947/01/01	Nové Mesto and Váhom, Czechoslovakia	living		Slovak-Austrian	Pupil of Ricardo Odnoposoff and Igor Oistrakh
Bernard, Claire		1947	Rouen, France	living		French	Pupil of Henryk Szeryng / 1st prize George Enescu International Competition, 1964 / / Owned a "Giuseppe Guarnieri", 1741 /
Thompson, Gwen	Gwendoline Linda Louise Thompson	1947/03/30	Winnipeg, Canada	living		Canadian	Pupil of Ivan Galamian
Chung, Kyung-Wha		1948/03/26	Seoul, South Korea	living		Korean	Pupil of Ivan Galamian / 1st Prize "Leventritt International Competition", 1967
Kavafian, Ani		1948/05/10	Istanbul, Turkey	living		American-Armenian	Pupil of Ara Zerounian, Mischa Mischakoff and Ivan Galamian / professor of violin at Yale University / plays the 1736 "Muir McKenzie" Stradivarius violin
Vasile, Cornelia		1948/12/10	Timişoara, Romania	2010/09/01	Munich, Germany	Romanian	Pupil of Ivry Gitlis in Salzburg and Paris, 1969–70 / / in 1969 she recorded Paganini's 24 Caprices, for DGG 'Debut Collection' /
Verhey, Emmy		1949/03/13	Amsterdam, Netherlands	living		Dutch	Pupil of Herman Krebbers, Wolfgang Schneiderhan and David Oistrakh
Lamon, Jeanne		1949/08/14	New York, New York US	2021/06/20	Ontario, Canada	American	Baroque violin / Pupil of Robert Koff and Herman Krebbers
Volckaert, Edith		1949/08/27	Gand, Belgium	1992/07/02	Paris, France	Belgian	
Sîrbu, Mariana	Mariana Sirbu	1950s ?	Iaşi, Romania	2023/08/01		Romanian	Pupil of Stefan Gheorghiu / 1st violin of Academica String Quartet and Quartetto Stradivari / Wife of cellist Mihai Dancila and mother of violinist Cristina Dancila / Plays the "Conte de Fontana, Peterlongo, Oistrakh" Stradivari, 1702
Gazeau, Sylvie		1950/01/30	Orléans, France	living		French	
Comberti, Micaela		1952/09/28	London, England	2003/03/04		English	Pupil of Manoug Parikian and Sándor Végh / played in a number of ensembles / final performance in 2003
Marcovici, Silvia		1952/01/30	Bacău, Romania	living	Strasbourg France	Romanian	Performs internationally as a soloist / also chamber musician, recitalist and educator
Wallfisch, Elizabeth	b. Elizabeth Hunt	1952/01/28	Australia	living		English	Baroque violin / Wife of cellist Raphael Wallfisch /
Marcovici, Silvia		1952/01/30	Bacău, Romania	living	Graz, Austria	Romanian	Pupil of Stefan Gheorghiu / 2nd prize Long-Thibaud Competition, 1969
Kavafian, Ida		1952/10/29	Istanbul, Turkey	living		American-Armenian	Pupil of Ara Zerounian, Mischa Mischakoff and Ivan Galamian
Huggett, Monica		1953/05/16	London, England	living		English	Baroque violin / Pupil of Manoug Parikian, Kato Havas and Sigiswald Kuijken
Milanova, Vanya		1954/01/12	Bulgaria	living		Bulgarian	3rd Prize "Paganini International Competition" in 1973 / one of the first female violinists to record Paganini's 24 Caprices – LP Simax PS 1020 (p)1985
Bury, Alison		1954/01/20	Woking, England	living		British	Leader of the English Baroque Soloists (1983–2008) / co-leader of the Orchestra of the Age of Enlightenment
Ishikawa, Shizuka		1954	Tokyo, Japan	living		Japanese	2nd prize Henryk Wieniawski Violin Competition, 1972
Carruzzo, Madeleine		1956	Sion, Switzerland	living		Swiss	Pupil of Tibor Varga / first women engaged by the Berlin Philharmonic
Smith, Wilma		1956	Fiji	living		Fijan / New Zealand	Pupil of Dorothy DeLay and Louis Krasner / founder of the New Zealand String Quartet / concertmaster of the New Zealand Symphony Orchestra
Chase, Stephanie	Lynnette Seah Mei Tsing / born Seah Mei Tsing	1957	Evanston, Illinois, US	living		American	Pupil of Arthur Grumiaux / concerts and recitals in US and Mexico / recording artist and educator
Seah, Lynnette		1957	Singapore	living		Singaporean	Pupil of Goh Soon Tioe / co-leader of the Singapore Symphony Orchestra / soloist and recitalist
Müllejans, Petra		1959	Düsseldorf, Germany	living		German	Pupil of Rainer Kussmaul / specialist in Baroque violin / educator
Mullova, Viktoria	Viktoria Yurievna Mullova	1959/11/27	Zhukovsky, Moscow, Russia	living	London, England	Russian	Pupil of Leonid Kogan / Plays the "Jules Falk" Stradivari, 1723 c. and a "Giovanni Battista Guadagnini", 1750 c.
Wishart, Stevie		1959	United Kingdom	living		English	Violinist and composer, specializing in early music and the medieval violin / member of the Sinfonye ensemble / recording artist
Juillet, Chantal		1960/12/19	Montreal, Canada	living		Canadian	Award-winning young classical violinist /founded Saratoga Chamber Music Festival / educator
Malgoire, Florence		1960/03/09	Dugny, France	living		French	Baroque violin / Pupil of Sigiswald Kuijken / daughter of Jean-Claude Malgoire
Weiling, Vera Tsu	Vera Tsu / Vera Tsu Wei Ling	1960	Shanghai, China	living		Chinese	Prominent classical violinist / suffered under the cultural revolution / studied in America under Daniel Heifetz / soloist and chamber musician / educator
Salerno-Sonnenberg, Nadja	b. Nadja Rose Catherine Salerno-Sonnenberg	1961/01/10	Rome, Italy	living		Italo-American	Pupil of Dorothy DeLay
Jenson, Dylana		1961/05/14	Los Angeles, California, US	living	Grand Rapids, Michigan, US	American	Pupil of Nathan Milstein and Josef Gingold
Paetsch, Michaela	Michaela Paetsch Neftel	1961/11/12	Colorado Springs, Colorado, US	living	Bern, Switzerland	American	
Dubeau, Angèle		1962/03/24	Saint-Norbert, Quebec	living		Canadian	Pupil of Dorothy DeLay / international performer, recording artist and broadcaster for Radio-Canada
Kimura, Mari	Kimura Mari	1962	Japan	living		Japanese	Violinist and composer / educator / recording artist
Newman, Maria	Maria Louise Newman	1962/01/18	Los Angeles, California US	living		American	Violinist, violist, composer, conductor, arranger
Mutter, Anne-Sophie		1963/06/29	Rheinfelden, Germany	living		German	Pupil of Erna Honigberger and Aida Stucki / Owns the "Emiliani" Stradivari, 1703 (Karajan's gift, 1979) and the "Lord Dunn-Raven" Stradivari, 1710 (that belonged to Jelly d'Arányi)
Peters, Jane		1963	Adelaide, Australia	living		Australian	Violinist / Arts ambassador for Australia
Buchdahl, Kate		1964/09/30	Canberra, Australia	1992/12/10		Australian	Pupil of Sándor Végh / toured internationally
Rolland, Brigitte		1964/19/08	Montreal, Canada	living		Australian	Pupil of Mildred Goodman and Rodney Friend / soloist and recitalist
Gravoin, Anne		1965/11/04	Montauban, France	living		French	Pupil of Gérard Poulet / soloist and chamber musician / founded the Régie Orchestre
Little, Tasmin		1965/05/13	London, England	living		English	
Mellem, Kristin		1965/03/21	Norway	living		Norwegian	violinist, composer and conductor / educator
Petrozzi, Clara		1965/12/30	Lima, Peru	living	Finland	Peruvian	violinist and viola soloist / chamber musician / composer and educator
Popov, Katia		1965/03/03	Sofia, Bulgaria	2018/05/18	US	Bulgarian-American	soloist / chamber musician / concertmaster / session musician
Takezawa, Kyoko		1966/10/30	Ōbu, Aichi, Japan	living	US	Japanese	
Keulen, Isabelle van		1966/12/16	Mildrecht, Netherlands	living	Netherlands	Dutch	Pupil of Davina van Wely. Also violist. Won Eurovision Young Musicians contest 1984. Chamber musician and educator
Lee Chin, Siow		1966	Singapore	living		Singaporean	Pupil of Aaron Rosand, Jascha Brodsky, Felix Galimir / international soloist / educator
Frank, Pamela		1967/06/20	New York, New York US	living		American	
Bossert, Laura Anne		1968/04/24	Chatham Township, New Jersey US	living		American	Studied at the Eastman School of Music / has been leader of various orchestras
Ikuko Kawai, Ikuko Kawai	Kawai Ikuko	1968/01/19	Takamatsu, Japan	living		Japanese	Violinist and composer / international soloist / recording artist
Podger, Rachel		1968	England	living		English	Studied under David Takeno, Pauline Scott and Micaela Comberti / specializes in Baroque chamber music
Cantoreggi, Sandrine		1969/05/29	Bègles, France	living		Luxembourg	Pupil of Pierre Amoyal and Carlo Van Neste / performances in concert halls across Europe / now educator at the Luxembourg Conservatoire
Korkeala, Sonja		1969	Oulu, Finland	living		Finnish	Pupil of Ari Angervo, Maria Vermes nad Ana Chumachenco / chamber musician and educator
Astrand, Christina		1969/06/06	Skanderborg, Denmark	living		Danish	Leader of the Danish National Symphony Orchestra
Brava, Linda	Linda Cullberg Lampenius	1970/02/26	Helsinki, Finland	living		Finnish	child prodigy / leader of the Helsinki Strings / pupil of Jorma Panula and Eri Klas / has played internationally with leading orchestras
Kim Chee-yun	Chee-Yun	1970	Seoul, South Korea	living	Dallas, Texas, US	South Korean	Pupil of Dorothy Delay, Hyo Kang and Felix Galimir / recitalist and soloist / educator
Meyers, Anne Akiko		1970/05/15	San Diego, California, US	living		American	
Anthony, Adele		1970/10/01	Singapore	living		Australian	Pupil of Lyndall Hendrickson and Beryl Kimber / now based in the United States
Båtnes, Elise		1971/06/24	Trondheim, Norway	living		Norwegian	Pupil of Dorothy Delay, Ruggiero Ricci, David Takeno and Arve Tellefsen / leader several orchestras, currently the Oslo Philharmonic
Gotō, Midori	Midori	1971/10/25	Osaka, Japan	living		Japanese	/ she plays the "ex Huberman – Ricci" Guarneri del Gesù
Krasko, Julia		1971/04/06	Moscow, Russia	living		Russian	Pupil of Maya Glezarova / educator at the Moscow Conservatory
Reuter, Sophia		1971	Dresden, Germany	living		German	Pupil of Yehudi Menuhin and Alberto Lysy / violinist and violist / soloist, orchestral performer, chamber musician and educator
St. John, Lara		1971/04/15	London, Ontario, Canada	living		Canadian	Pupil of Linda Cerone, Gérard Jarry and Felix Galimir / international soloist with major symphony orchestras
Suwanai, Akiko		1972/02/07	Japan	living		Japanese	Pupil of Toshiya Eto / 1st Prize "International Tchaikovsky Competition" in 1990
Faust, Isabelle		1972/03/19	Esslingen am Neckar, Germany	living		German	Pupil of Christoph Poppen / 1st Prize Paganini Competition, 1993 / Plays the "Bella addormentata" Stradivari, 1704
Thorsen, Marianne		1972/03/13	Trondheim, Norway	living		Norwegian	Pupil of Bjarne Fiskum and György Pauk / founded and led the Leopold String Trio / educator
Szilvay, Réka		1972	Helsinki, Finland	living		Finnish	Classical violinist
Pitcairn, Elizabeth		1973/12/05	Bucks County, Pennsylvania, US	living		American	Performs as soloist / president of the Luzerne Music Center
Barton, Rachel	Rachel Barton Pine	1974/10/11	Chicago, Illinois, US	living		American	Studied with Roland and Almita Vamos
Khitruk, Anastasia	Анастасия Хитрук	1974/08	Moscow, USSR	living		Russian-American	Studied with Dorothy DeLay at Juilliard School
Scheublé, Marie		1974	France	living		French	Pupil of Gérard Poulet / first prize in the Yehudi Menuhin Competition / post-romantic repertoire
Todorova, Mariana		1974	Varna, Bulgaria	living		Bulgarian	Soloist with various European orchestras / concertmaster of the Spanish Radiotelevision orchestra / chamber musician
Belcea, Corina		1975	Romania	living		Romanian	Pupil of Natalia Boyarskaya at the Yehudi Menukin School / founded the Belcea Quartet
Baker, Jenny Oaks		1975/05/27	Provo, Utah US	living		American	Former member of the National Symphony Orchestra / successful recording artist
Ecker, Haylie		1975/10/09	Perth, Australia	living		Australian	founding member of the Bond string quartet / artistic director of the children's classical concert series PLAY!
Kam Ning		1975	Singapore	living		Singaporean	Student of Yehudi Menuhin and later Donald Weilerstein / Soloist with leading orchestras
Misbakhova, Elvira	Elvira Rafailovna Misbakhova	1975/06/20	Nizhnekamsk, Russia	living	Montreal	Russian-Canadian	violinist and violist / chamber musician / recording artist / international soloist
Zgraggen, Simone		1975/08/08	Altdorf, Switzerland	living		Swiss	Pupil of Alexander van Wijnkoop and Ulf Hoelscher / concertmaster of Basel Sinfonietta / educator
Widmann, Carolin		1976	Munich, Germany	living		German	Studied with Igor Ozim, Michèle Auclair and David Takeno / Plays a 1782 Giovanni Battista Guadagnini
Contzen, Mirijam		1976	Münster, Germany	living		German	Pupil of Tibor Varga /
Özyürek, Hande		1976	Istanbul, Turkey	living		German	Pupil of Çiğdem İyicil / award-winning soloist and chamber musician across Europe
Hagner, Viviane		1977	Munich, Germany	living		German	soloist with leading orchestras / chamber musician
Hou, Susanne	Yi-Jia Susanne Hou	1977	Shanghai, China	living		Canadian	Pupil of Dorothy DeLay, Naoko Tanaka, and Cho-Liang Lin / Violinist / recording artist
Li I-ching		1977/12/18	Taiwan	living		Taiwanese	International soloist / concertmaster of Taiwan's National Symphony Orchestra
Josefowicz, Leila	Leila Bronia Josefowicz	1977/19/20	Mississauga, Ontario	living		Canadian	Studied with Jaime Laredo, Joseph Gingold, Felix Galimir and Jascha Brodsky / Plays the 1739 "Ebersolt" Guarneri del Gesù.
Laurenceau, Geneviève		1977/11/02	Strasbourg, France	living		French	Pupil of Wolfgang Marschner and Zakhar Bron / international soloist, chamber musician and recording artist / educator
Masin, Gwendolyn		1977/11/77	Amsterdam, Netherlands	living		Dutch	Pupil of Herman Krebbers / tours as soloist and chamber musician / performances with various orchestras / educator
Tokareva, Nadezda		1977/11/27	Penza, Russia	living	Ljubljana, Slovenia	Russian-Slovenian	Pupil of Eduard Grach / international soloist / chamber musician / educator
Jansen, Janine		1978/01/07	Soest, Netherlands	living		Dutch	Pupil of Philippe Hirschhorn and Boris Belkin / Plays the "Barrere" Stradivari, 1727
Becker-Bender, Tanja		1978/02/11	Stuttgart, Germany	living		German	Pupil of Helmut Zehetmair, Wolfgang Marschner and Wilhelm Melcher
Mae, Vanessa	Vanessa Mae Vanakorn Nicholson / Chén Měi	1978/10/27	Singapore	living		British	Genres: Classical, techno, electronic and pop
Petcu-Colan, Ioana		1978	Cork, Ireland	living		Irish	soloist and widely performed chamber musician / interest in contemporary music
Trobäck, Sara	born Sara Katarina Trobäck	1978	Örebro, Sweden	living	Gothenburg	Swedish	Pupil of György Pauk / co-founder of Trio Poseidon / leader of the Gothenburg Symphony orchestra
Batiashvili, Lisa	b. Elisabed Batiashvili	1979	Tbilisi, Georgia	living		Georgian	2nd Prize Sibelius Competition, 1995 / Plays the "Engleman" Stradivari, 1709
Cantagrill, Marie		1979	France	living		French	Pupil of Igor Oïstrakh / soloist with orchestras and in recitals
Favier, Amanda		1979/04/07	Paris, France	living		French	Pupil of Gérard Poulet and Igor Ozim / soloist from age 9 / chamber musician / recording artist
Gebert, Anna		1979	Warsaw, Poland	living		Finnish	Pupil of Igor Bezrodny and Magdalena Rezler / concert master of the Trondheim Symphony Orchestra / chamber musician
Ferschtman, Liza		1979	Hilversum, Netherlands	living		Dutch	Pupil of Yvry Gitlis, Igor Oistrakh and Aaron Rosand / soloist appearing with several orchestras / chamber musician
Hahn, Hilary		1979/11/27	Lexington, Kentucky, US	living		American	Pupil of Klara Berkovich and Jascha Brodsky / Plays an 1864 copy of Paganini's Cannone made by Vuillaume
Ninomiya, Ayano		1979	Takamatsu, Japan	living		Japanese-American	Pupil of Robert Mann / chamber musician performing internationally with various ensembles
Saeijs, Frederieke		1979/01/25	The Hague, Netherlands	living		Dutch	International soloist with various orchestras / educator
Vänskä, Satu		1979	Kinki, Japan	living	Australia	Finnish-Australian	Studied under Ilya Grubert, Zinaida Gilels and Pavel Vernikov / Award-winning soloist / assistant leader of the Australian Chamber Orchestra
Chang, Sarah	b. Young Joo Chang	1980/12/10	Philadelphia, Pennsylvania, US	living		Korean-American	Pupil of Dorothy DeLay / Plays the "ex Isaac Stern" Guarneri del Gesù, 1717
Grether, Elsa		1980/06/28	Mulhouse, France	living		French	Pupil of Ruggiero Ricci / soloist and recitalist performing in music festivals in France and abroad
Canellakis, Karina		1981/08/23	New York, New York US	living		American	Pupil of Ida Kavafian / violinist who later became a conductor
Chiche, Marina		1981/11/10	Marseille, France	living		French	Pupil of Jean Ter-Merguerian and Ana Chumachenco / international soloist and recitalist / educator, recording artist and radio producer / Plays a Giuseppe Gagliano, 1762
Kolly d'Alba, Rachel		1981/05/21	Lausanne, Switzerland	living		Swiss	Studied with Igor Ozim, Franco Gulli, Thomas Kakuska, Thomas Brandis, Hansheinz Schneeberger and Ivry Gitlis / Plays a 1732 Stradivari
Manoukian, Catherine		1981/06/02	Toronto, Canada	living		Canadian	Pupil of Dorothy DeLay / débuted with the Vancouver Symphony Orchestra when 12 / soloist with many prominent orchestras / now based in Sweden
Montgomery, Jessie		1981	New York, New York US	living		American	violinist, composer, chamber musician and music educator
Nemtanu, Sarah		1981		living		Franco-Romanian	soloist with Luc Héry / concertmaster of the Orchestre national de France / recording artist
Skride, Baiba	Riga, Latvia	1981		living		Latvian	International performer with various orchestras / recording artist
Steinbacher, Arabella		1981/11/14	Munich, Germany	living		German	Pupil of Dorothy DeLay and Ivry Gitlis / Plays the "Booth" Stradivari, 1716
Lee, Min	Lee Huei Min	c. 1982	Singapore	living		Singaporean	Pupil of Erick Friedman / soloist with leading orchestras
Batikian, Ani		1982/11/22	Yerevan, Armenia	living		Armenian	Studied at the Royal Academy of Music, receiving top violin prize / later pupil of Salvatore Accardo in Italy / solo concert performer
Lunny, Cora Venus		1982	Dublin, Ireland	living		Irish	Student of Joji Hattori and Vladimir Spivakov / award-winning classical musician / also folk music / recording artist
Shaw, Caroline		1982/08/01	Greenville, North Carolina, US	living		American	Violinist and composer / Pulitzer Prize for Music / chamber musician
Borrani, Lorenza		1983	Florence, Italy	living		Italian	Leader, director, soloist and chamber musician / educator
Shoji, Sayaka		1983/01/30	Tokyo, Japan	living		Japanese	Studied with Uto Ughi and Riccardo Brengola at Accademia Musicale Chigiana in Siena, and later with Saschko Gawriloff and Zakhar Bron in Germany / Plays the "Recamier" Stradivari, 1729
Fischer, Julia		1983/06/15	Munich, Germany	living		German	Also concert pianist / Pupil of Lydia Dubrowskaya and Ana Chumachenco / Plays a Philipp Augustin violin, 2012
Linnebach, Jessica		1983	Edmonton, Canada	living		Canadian	Founding member of the Zukerman Chamber Players / soloist and chamber musician
Pečeny, Oksana		1983/04/23	Kyiv, Ukraine	living		Ukrainian	Student of Primož Novsak / soloist with Slovenian orchestras / chamber musician
Pogostkina, Alina		1983/11/18	Leningrad, Russia	living		Russian-German	Pupil of Antje Weithaas / She won the 1997 Louis Spohr Competition and 1st Prize at the International Jean Sibelius Violin Competition, 2005
Yang Jing		1983	Gulangyu, China	living		Chinese	award-winning violinist, violist and five-string violist / viola principal of Camerata Salzburg, principal violist of the Frankfurt Radio Symphony
Deutsch, Lindsay		1984/11/28	Houston, Texas, US	living		American	Pupil of Robert Lipsett / soloist performances from the age of 11 / appearances with orchestras throughout US and Canada
Kramperová, Iva		1984	Czechoslovakia	living		Czech	Concert master of the Barocco sempre giovane / concert performer and recording artist / educator
Samuelsen, Mari		1984/12/21	Hamar, Norway	living		Norwegian	Child prodigy / pupil of Arve Tellefsen and Stephan Barratt-Due / frequently performs with her brother Håkon, a cellist
Chen, Catharina		1985	Norway	living		Norwegian	Concert master of the Norwegian National Opera and Ballet
Moreno, Leticia		1985	Madrid, Spain	living		Spanish	Pupil of Zakhar Bron / performed from an early age / extensive repertoire
Yoon, Soyoung		1984/10/18	Seoul, South Korea	living		South Korean	Pupil of Zakhar Bron / award-winning violinist
Ibragimova, Alina		1985/09/28	Polevskoy, Russia	living		Russian	Pupil of Valentina Korolkova and Natalya Boyarskaya / recitalist, soloist and recording artist based in London
Yukawa, Diana	Daiana Yukawa	1985/09/16	Tokyo, Japan	living		British	Violinist and composer / Classical and modern performer
Kamio, Mayuko		1986/06/12	Osaka, Japan	living		Japanese	Pupil of Zakhar Bron / 1st Prize at Tchaikovsky Competition, 2007 / Plays the 1727 "ex Joseph Joachim" Stradivarius, on loan from Suntory
Frang, Vilde		1986/08/19	Oslo, Norway	living		Norwegian	Pupil of Anne-Sophie Mutter, Kolja Blacher and Ana Chumachenco / Plays a Jean-Baptiste Vuillaume, 1864
Kholodnaya, Olga	Olga Show	1987/12/10	Cheboksary, Russia	living		Russian	Pupil of Zakhar Bron, Marcus Wolf and Didier Lockwood / Plays an 1853 Jean Baptiste Vuillaume
Yang, Tianwa	Yáng Tianwa	1987/04/08	Beijing, China	living		Chinese	Pupil of Lin Yaoji and protégé by Isaac Stern / Plays a Giuseppe Antonio Guarneri del Gesù, 1730
Benedetti, Nicola		1987/07/19	West Kilbride, Scotland, UK	living		English	Pupil of Yehudi Menuhin and Natasha Boyarskaya
Hanslip, Cloé	Chloë Elise Hanslip	1987/09/28	Guildford, UK	living		English	Pupil of Natasha Boyarskaya and Zakhar Bron / Plays a 1737 Guarneri del Gesù
Kang, Clara-Jumi	Clara-Jumi Kang	1987	Mannheim, Germany	living		German, Korean-German	Pupil of Valery Gradov, Dorothy Delay and Hyo Kang / Plays a 1708 "Ex-Strauss" Stradivarius
Lott, Maria-Elisabeth	Clara-Jumi Kang	1987/06/02	Schramberg, Germany	living		German	International orchestral soloist
Shin, Zia Hyunsu	Hyun-Soo Shin	1987/07/16	Jeonju, South Korea	living		South Korean	Award-winning violinist
Abrigo, Irene	Irene Abrigo	1988/12/03	Turin, Italy	living	Winterthur, Switzerland	Italian	Solo concert violinist, student of Marie-Annick Nicolas, Pierre Amoyal and Corina Belcea. She plays a Giovanni Battista Guadagnini, 1758
Azaiez, Yasmine		1988/10/16	London, England	living		British	Studied at the Yehudi Menuhin School / now based in Tunisia
Eberle, Veronika		1988/12/26	Donauwörth, Germany	living		German	She plays the "ex Busch" Giovanni Battista Guadagnini, 1783
Hemsing, Ragnhild		1988/02/15	Nord-Aurdal, Norway	living		Norwegian	débuted with the Bergan Philharmonic when 13 / appearances at major festivals and concert halls in Norway
Nobile, Carlotta		1988/12/20	Rome, Italy	2013/07/16	Benevento, Italy	Italian	violinist, art historian and writer / artistic director of Santa Sophia Academy chamber orchestra
Kim, Bomsori		1989/12/13	Daegu, South Korea	living	New York City, USA	Korean	Pupil of Young Uck Kim, Sylvia Rosenberg, and Ronald Copes / Plays a J.B. Guadagnini Turin, 1774
Pike, Jennifer		1989/11/09	England	living		English	At age 12 was BBC Young Musician of the Year / performances with various orchestras
Suzuki, Airi	Suzuki Airi	1989/11/09	Tokyo, Japan	living		Japanese	Award-winning young violinist
Soumm, Alexandra		1989/05/17	Moscow, Russia	living	Paris	French	Award-winning violinist / international soloist with several orchestras
Šūmane, Paula		1989/05/04	Riga, Latvia	living		Latvian	Soloist, student of Yair Kless and Boris Garlitsky
Hemsing, Eldbjørg		1990/02/16	Nord-Aurdal, Norway	living		Norwegian	child prodigy / pupil of Boris Kuschnir / collaboration with Tan Dun / chamber musician and soloist with numerous orchestras
Chen, Stella		1992	US	living		Asian-American	An alumnus of the New England Conservatory of Music and student of Li Lin and Catherine Cho at Juilliard as of July 2020.
Goicea, Ioana Crstina		1993/11/06	Bucharest, Romania	living		Romanian	Pupil of Mariana Sîrbu / recitalist, soloist and chamber musician
Brabetz, Christina		1993/10/08	Windhoek, Namibia	living		South African	Pupil of Thomas Christian at Hochschule für Musik Detmold / winner of TONALi Grand Prix
Fisher, Salina		1993/10/06	New Zealand	living		New Zealand	Violinist and composer
Nuez Suarez, Rebeca	Rebeca Nuez	1993/11/10	Las Palmas, Spain	living	London, England	Spanish	Violinist interested in contemporary classical music
Petryshak, Anastasiya		1994/04/12	Ivano-Frankivsk, Ukraine	living		Ukrainian	Classical violinist working with Andrea Bocelli
Yoo, Esthe		1994/06/11	US	living		American	pupil of Ana Chumachenco / international soloist with various orchestras / chamber musician / recording artist
Taglioretti, Ana Lucrecia		1995/12/25	Paraguay	2020/1/7	Asunción, Paraguay	Paraguan	Played with the Paraguayan National Symphonic Orchestra and other groups / cause of death unknown
Matsumoto, Hiroka	Matsumoto Hiroka	1995	Yokohama, Japan	living		Japanese	student of Koichiro Harada and Gérard Poulet / award-winning classical violinist who played from an early age
Stapf, Judith		1997/05/31	Rheinbach, Germany	living		German	Soloist with various orchestras
Elders, Hawijch		1998/10/31	Grenoble, France	living		Dutch	Pupil of Ilya Grubert / performances in the Netherlands and abroad
Stirling, Lindsey		1986/09/21	Santa Ana, California, US	living		American	
Ramsay, Meredith Ezinma	Ezinma	1991/01/11	Lincoln, Nebraska US			American	
Dueñas Fernández, María	María Dueñas	2002/12/04	Granada, Spain	living		Spanish	Deutsche Grammophon artist & composer, 2021 First Prize winner of the Yehudi Menuhin International Competition for Young Violinists (Senior Category)

== Sortable list for those without known birthdate ==
Total listed: 43

Name	Alias	Active from	Birthplace	Died	Place last living	Nationality	Notes
Aller, Judith		2000s	Los Angeles, US	living		American	Pupil of Jascha Heifetz / recitalist and soloist with the Pori Symphony Orchestra and with the Los Angeles Chamber Orchestra
Augustyn, Kinga		2000s	Wrocław, Poland	living	New York City	Polish-American	Pupil of Zbigniew Szuflat and Dorothy DeLay / soloist with various orchestras / recording artist
Babut du Marès, Camille		2000s	Belgium	living	Belgium	Belgian	Pupil of Véronique Bogaerts and Yuzuko Horigome / international soloist and recitalist
Benjamin, Mira		2010s	Vancouver, Canada	living	London, England	Canadian	Violinist and chamber musician / former member of Quatuor Bozzini / recording artist
Black, Zoë		2010s	Australia	living		Australian	Recitalist and soloist / plays with the Australian Chamber Orchestra
Chebotareva, Anastasia		2000s	Odesa, Ukraine	living		Ukrainian	Tours in Italy, UK, France and German / recording artist
Dahn, Nancy		1990s	Canada	living		Canadian	Classical violinist and violist / educator / co-founded the Tuckamore Festival
Derome, Julie-Anne		1990s	Montreal, Canada	living		Canadian	Pupil of Taras Gabora and Sonia Jelinkova / Interested in 20th-century music / chamber musician and soloist / recording artist
Frautschi, Jennifer		2000s	Pasadena, California, US	living	Brookline, Massachusetts, US	American	Pupil of Robert Lipsett and Robert Mann / soloist with various orchestras
Gomyo, Karen		2010s	Tokyo, Japan	living		Canadian	Student of Mauricio Fuks, Dorothy DeLay and Donald Weilerstein / soloist and chamber musician
Gould, Clio		2000s	England	living		English	Classical violinist, educator, director of the Royal Academy Soloists and leader of the Royal Philharmonic Orchestra
Grigoreva, Viktoria		1990s	Kharkiv, Ukraine	living	London, England	Ukrainian	Studied under Semion Mikitiansky and Irina Grebneva / Concert violinist and educator
Kouznetsova, Maria		1991	Ryazan, Russia	living		Russian	Award-winning young violinist
Ingolfsson, Judith		1990s	Reykjavik, Iceland	living	Stuttgart, Germany	Icelandic	Student of Jascha Brodsky / international soloist appearing with many orchestras / chamber musician
Johnson, Karen		2000s	Gilbert, Arizona, US	living		American	Chamber musician and concertmaster
Kokas, Katalin		2000s	Kaposvár, Hungary	living		Hungarian	Student of Ferenc Halász and Dénes Kovács / Chamber musician performing with various orchestras
Kwon, Yoon		1990s	Seoul, South Korea	living		Korean-American	Child prodigy / student of Dorothy DeLay, Hyo Kang, Cho-Liang Lin and Donald Weilerstein / duos with pianist sister Min Kwon / chamber musician / educator
Lester, Gabrielle		1980s	London, England	living		English	Classical violinist, orchestra leader and chamber musician / discography of classical, popular and soundtrack music
León, Eva		1990s	Las Palmas, Spain	living		Spanish	International classical violinist, performances with leading orchestras / recording artist
Makhnev, Elena		2000s	Guanajuato, Mexico	living		Mexican	Virtuoso violinist currently studying in Moscow
Mason, Frances		1960s	United Kingdom	living		British	Studied under Alan Loveday / specializing in chamber music but also soloist / educator
Michell, Edna		1960s	Tel Aviv, Israel	living		Israeli-American	Studied under Lorand Fenyves, Ödön Pártos and Ivan Galamian / international recitalist and soloist / founder of the Cantilena Chamber Players / educator
Olujić, Tatjana		1970s	Belgrade, Serbia	living		Serbian	Award-winning violinist and educator
Palmer, Ruth		2000s	United Kingdom	living		British	award-winning recitalist and recording artist
Paulet, Stéphanie		2010s	Rhône-Alpes, France	living	Paris	French	First violin in French Baroque ensembles / chamber musician and educator
Peña, Adela		1990s	New York City, US	living		American	Student of Rochelle Walton / founding member of the Eroica Trio
Piérot, Alice		1980s	France	living		French	Chamber musician, Baroque violinist and recording artist / member of the Amarillis ensemble / educator
Raum, Erika		1990s	Canada	living		Canadian	Student of Lorand Fenyves / recitalist and chamber musician / orchestral appearances in Canada and abroad
Robert, Lucie		1980s	Montreal, Canada	living		Canadian	Student of Josef Gingold / violinist, composer and educator
Safonova, Ania		1990s	Tomsk, Russia	living	London, England	Russian-Israeli	Student of Svetlanda Goffman and later Felix Andrievsky / Concertmaster of the Royal Opera House, Covent Garden / chamber musician
Sakharova, Julia		2000s	Zheleznovodsk, Russia	living	US	Russian	Child prodigy / student of Taras Gabora, Almita Vamos, Milan Vitek and Donald Weilerstein / assistant concertmaster, chamber musician, educator
Schnarch, Ani		2000s	Bucharest, Romania	living	London, England	Israeli-British	Student of Felix Andrievsky / Soloist and chamber musician performing with various orchestras / educator
Schmitt, Hélène		1990s	France	living	Boulogne-Billancourt, France	French	Chamber musician specializing in Baroque music / recording artist / educator
Shihoten, Lisa		1990s	Chicago, US	living	Houston, US	American	Student of Betty Haag-Kuhnke / chamber musician and recitalist / educator
Simpson, Mary		2000s	Virginia, US	living	Houston, US	American	Classically trained violinist, now playing bluegrass
Sîrbu, Mariana		1960s	Iași, Romania	living	Leipzig, Germany	Romanian	Student of Ștefan Gheorghiu / international soloist / founder of the Academia String Quartet / educator
Stefanovich-Gruppman, Vesna		1990s	Serbia	living	Rotterdam, Netherlands	Serbian	Soloist and chamber musician / performances with various orchestras / recording artist / educator
Sung, Janet		2000s	New York City, US	living	Chicago, US	American	Student of Josef Gingold / soloist with numerous orchestras / educator
Tcholakova, Ralitsa		2000s	Bulgaria	living		Canadian	International soloist and chamber musician / music writer / recording artist
Tenenbaum, Mela		1970s	Ukraine	living		American	Soloist and chamber musician / recording artist
Thompson, Candida		2000s	Glasgow, Scotland	living	Amsterdam, Netherlands	British	Student of David Takeno / International chamber musician and soloist / leader of the Amsterdam Sinfonietta / recording artist
Thompson, Shirley J.		1990s	London, England	living	London, England	British	Composer, conductor, violinist and academic
Udagawa, Hideko		2000s	Japan	living	London, England	Japanese	International soloist / recording artist

== See also ==
- List of women classical pianists
- Lists of women in music
- Women in music

== General references ==
- "Female Performers on the Violin", The Musical World, No.CLXVI – New Series No.LXXII, p. 34 (May 16, 1839)
- "Famous Violinists of To-day and Yesterday", Chapter X. "Women as Violini", Henry C. Lahee (1899)
- "Lady Violinists", The Musical Times, Vol. 47, No. 764, pp. 662–668 (Oct. 1, 1906)
- An Encyclopedia of the Violin, Alberto Bachmann (1926)
- "Violino e Violinisti", Enciclopedia Italiana Treccani (1937)
- "Violin virtuosos: from Paganini to the 21st century", Henry Roth (1997)
- "Allievi di Hubay (selezione)", Gianluca La Villa (2003)
- "Great female violinists of the past", Violinist.com – Blog (2010)
- "Violin works with connections to female violinists", Violinist.com – Blog (2011)
- "Great Female Violinists: A List" – Blog (2011)
- Article: "Addendum on Female Violinists" by George Dubourg (1852) – Blog (2011)
- "Who were the early female violinists?", The Strad (March 7, 2014)
- "musikwissenschaftliche Frauen- und Geschlechterforschung", search page in German – Sophie Drinke Institut (c)2013
