= Benjamin Bowman =

American-Canadian violinist (born 1979)

- Born: 20 September 1979 (age 47); Urbana, Illinois, United States
- Genres: Classical; chamber music
- Occupation: Violinist
- Years active: 1992–present
- Labels: RCA Red Seal, CHANDOS, ATMA Classique, Innova
- Website: www.bowmanviolin.com

Benjamin Walter Bowman (born September 20, 1979) is an American-Canadian violinist. The Metropolitan Opera and incoming Music Director Yannick Nézet-Séguin appointed Bowman as concertmaster as of the 2018-19 season, after a successful one-year term in 2017-18; he shares his role with David Chan. Bowman was Grammy-nominated in 2016 for his recording with the ARC (Artists of the Royal Conservatory) Ensemble 'Chamber Works of Jerzy Fitelberg' on the Chandos label. He has performed to critical acclaim throughout North America, Europe and Asia. He is a member or frequent guest artist for leading chamber music ensembles internationally, including the twice Grammy-nominated ARC Ensemble (Artists of The Royal Conservatory of Music), Art of Time Ensemble, and Leondari Ensemble. Bowman was featured on the 2013 Juno-winning album Levant and the 2011 Juno-nominated disc Armenian Chamber Music with the Amici Chamber Ensemble. Until 2019, he was the concertmaster of the American Ballet Theatre orchestra (as of October 2014). He is an ensemble member of Orchestra of St. Luke's.

Bowman's performances have been recorded for radio broadcast in Canada with the CBC, in the USA, the UK, Poland, Hungary, Switzerland, the Netherlands, Denmark and Korea. His discography includes recent solo and chamber-music releases on the RCA Red Seal, ATMA Classique, and Innova labels. Bowman received his Bachelor of Music degree from the Curtis Institute of Music in Philadelphia. In his spare time, he also composes and arranges music, and writes electronic music as a hobby.

== Education and early career ==
Bowman was born in Urbana, Illinois. He moved to Brandon, Manitoba, in 1981 where he started studying violin at the age of five. He studied with violinist Francis Chaplin from the age of nine until Chaplin's death in December 1993. Bowman then pursued his studies at Juilliard pre-college under the tutelage of Sally Thomas for one year before moving to Toronto to study with violinist/conductor David Zafer. At the age of 17 Bowman was invited to study at the Curtis Institute of Music in Philadelphia, where he studied with Aaron Rosand

== Recordings ==
- Two Roads to Exile: Braunfels: String Quintet – Busch: String Sextet – ARC Ensemble, Benjamin Bowman, Erika Raum, Marie Bérard, Steven Dann, Carolyn Blackwell, Bryan Epperson, David Hetherington. Producer: David Frost. Recorded at The Royal Conservatory of Music Koerner Hall. Label: RCA Red Seal Records / Sony Masterworks. April 2010
- Armenian Chamber Music – Amici Chamber Ensemble, ft. Benjamin Bowman, Isabel Bayrakdarian, Steven Dann. Recorded at Glenn Gould Studio Toronto. Label: ATMA Classique. February 2010
  - 2011 Juno nominated
- Nothing Left to Destroy – by MC Maguire, (The Discofication of the Mongols, Concerto for Violin & CPU): Benjamin Bowman. Label: Innova Recordings. September 2011
- Levant – Amici Chamber Ensemble, ft. Benjamin Bowman, Steven Sitarski, Steven Dann. Recorded at Glenn Gould Studio Toronto. Label: ATMA Classique. October 2012
  - 2013 Juno winner
- Paul Ben-Haim: Chamber Works – ARC Ensemble, Benjamin Bowman, Erika Raum, Marie Bérard, Steven Dann, Bryan Epperson, Joaquin Valdepenas, Dianne Werner, David Louie. Producers: David Frost, Ralph Couzens. Recorded at The Royal Conservatory of Music Koerner Hall. Label: Chandos Records. June 2013
- 1939 – Teng Li, Benjamin Bowman, and Meng-Chieh Liu. Producer: Bruce Egre. Recorded at the Canadian Broadcasting Centre's Glenn Gould Studio. Label: Azica Records. June 2015
- Chamber Works of Jerzy Fitelberg – ARC Ensemble, Benjamin Bowman, Erika Raum, Marie Bérard, Steven Dann, Bryan Epperson, Joaquin Valdepenas, and Kara Huber. Producer: David Frost. Recorded at The Royal Conservatory of Music Koerner Hall. Label: Chandos Records. October 2015
  - 2016 Juno nominated
  - 2016 Grammy nominated
