= String Quartet No. 17 =

String Quartet No. 17 may refer to:

- String Quartet No. 17 (Hill) by Alfred Hill
- String Quartet No. 17 (Milhaud), Op. 307, by Darius Milhaud
- String Quartet No. 17 (Mozart) by Wolfgang Amadeus Mozart
- String Quartet No. 17 (Villa-Lobos) by Heitor Villa-Lobos
