= Steven Dann =

Canadian violist (born 1953)

Steven Dann (born December 27, 1953) is a Canadian violist.

== Early years ==
Dann was born in Burnaby, British Columbia. He played the violin until 1970, when he switched to the viola. He began studying with Lorand Fenyves in Toronto in 1972, and continued his studies until he graduated from the University of Toronto in 1977. During this time, he also studied with Robert Pikler in Australia, as well as William Primrose and Bruno Giuranna.

Dann has held the position of principal viola with a number of orchestras, including the National Arts Centre Orchestra, the Royal Concertgebouw Orchestra in Amsterdam, the Vancouver Symphony Orchestra, and the Toronto Symphony Orchestra.

As soloist, Dann has performed concerti with several orchestras, as well as with conductors Vladimir Ashkenazy, Sir John Eliot Gardiner Ricardo del Carmen Fortuny and Andrew Davis. He has also commissioned concerti and chamber works from a number of composers, notably Alexina Louie, Christos Hatzis and Kaija Saariaho. He is a noted chamber musician as well as a member of the Axelrod Quartet and the Smithsonian Chamber Players, both based in Washington, D.C.

== Discography ==
=== Viola music ===
- Brahms Viola Works; Steven Dann (viola); Lambert Orkis (piano); Susan Platts (mezzo-soprano); ATMA Classique ACD2 2350 (2006)

Sonata No.1 in F minor for viola and piano, Op.120 No.1 (1894)
Sonata No.2 in E♭ major for viola and piano, Op.120 No.2 (1894)
2 Gesänge (2 Songs) for alto, viola and piano, Op.91 (1884)

- De Bréville • Koechlin • Tournemire: Sonatas & Suite; Steven Dann (viola); James Parker (piano); ATMA Classique ACD2 2519 (2013)

Pierre de Bréville – Sonata for viola and piano (1944)
Charles Koechlin – Sonata for viola and piano, Op. 53 (1911–1913)
Charles Tournemire – Suite en trois parties (Suite in Three Parts) for viola and piano, Op. 11 (1897)

- Portrait of the Viola; Steven Dann (viola); Bruce Vogt (piano); Musica Viva MVCD1072 (1994)

Rebecca Clarke – Sonata for viola and piano (1919)
Arnold Bax – Legend for viola and piano (1929)
Igor Stravinsky – Élégie for viola solo (1944)
Ralph Vaughan Williams – Romance for viola and piano (c.1914)
Hermann Reutter – Cinco Caprichos sobre Cervantes (5 Caprices on Cervantes) for viola solo (1968)
Jean Coulthard – Sonata Rhapsody for viola and piano (1962)

- Michael Conway Baker – Counterplay for viola and string orchestra, Op.16 (1971); Steven Dann (viola); Kazuyoshi Akiyama (conductor); CBC Vancouver Orchestra; CBC Music (2001)
- Paul Ben-Haim – 2 Landscapes (שתי תמונות נוף) for viola and piano, Op. 27 (1939); Steven Dann (viola); Dianne Werner (piano); Chandos Records 10769 (2013)
- Luciano Berio – Sequenza VI for viola solo (1967); Steven Dann (viola); Naxos 8.557661-63 (2006)
- Giovanni Battista Borghi – Sonata No.1 in D major for viola and double bass; Steven Dann (viola); Joel Quarrington (double bass); CBC Records 1108 (1999)
- Christos Hatzis – The Mega4 Meta4 for viola and tape (1990); Steven Dann (viola); Centrediscs (1994)
- Alexina Louie – Winter Music, Chamber Concerto for viola and 11 instruments (1989); Steven Dann (viola); Owen Underhill (conductor); Vancouver New Music Ensemble; CBC Music (2001)
- Godfrey Ridout – Ballade for viola and string orchestra (1938); Steven Dann (viola); Victor Feldbrill (conductor); Toronto Symphony Orchestra; Centrediscs (1993)
- Julius Röntgen – Sonata in C minor for viola and piano (1924); Steven Dann (viola); Dianne Werner (piano); RCA Red Seal 88697-15837-2 (2007)
- John Weinzweig – Tremologue for viola solo (1987); Steven Dann (viola); Centrediscs 5295 (1995)

=== Chamber music ===
- Chamber Suite: Catherine Wilson and Friends; DoReMi (2008)

Felix Mendelssohn – Sextet in D Major for piano and strings, Op. 110 (1824); Catherine Wilson, Marie Bérard, Steven Dann, Max Mandel, David Hetherington, Joel Quarrington
Srul Irving Glick – The Old Toronter Klezmer Suite, Quintet for piano and strings (1998); Catherine Wilson, Marie Bérard, Steven Dann, David Hetherington, Joel Quarrington

- Musique de Chambre Française; Susan Hoeppner (flute); Annalee Patipatanakoon (clarinet); Erika Raum (violin); Joaquin Valdepenas (violin); Steven Dann (viola); Amanda Forsyth (cello); Judy Loman (harp); Marquis Music (2005)

Claude Debussy – Sonate en trio for flute, viola and harp, L.137 (1915)
Maurice Ravel – Introduction et Allegro for harp, flute, clarinet and string quartet (1905)
Albert Roussel – Sérénade for flute, violin, viola, cello and harp, Op.30 (1925)
André Jolivet – Chant de Linos for flute, violin, viola, cello and harp (1944)

- Tālivaldis Ķeniņš – Piano Quartet No.2; Paul Meyer (violin); Steven Dann (viola); David Hetherington (cello), William Aide (piano); Centrediscs (1997)
- Mendelssohn: Requiem für Fanny; Quatour Alcan; ATMA Classique (2007)

String Quartet No.6 "Requiem für Fanny" in F minor, Op.80 (1847)
Four Pieces for string quartet, Op.81
String Quintet No.2 in B♭ major, Op.87 (1845)

- Mendelssohn • Gade: Octets for Strings; Smithsonian Chamber Players; Sony Classical (1992)

Felix Mendelssohn – String Octet in E♭ major, Op.20 (1825)
Niels Gade – String Octet in F major, Op.17 (1849)

- Right through the Bone: Julius Röntgen Chamber Music; ARC Ensemble; RCA Red Seal 88697-15837-2 (2007)

Piano Quintet in A minor, Op.100 (1927)
Trio in E♭ major for clarinet, viola and piano (1921)
Sonata in C minor for viola and piano (1924)
String Sextet in G major (1931)

- Kaija Saariaho – Je sens un deuxième coeur for viola, cello and piano (2003); Steven Dann (viola); Anssi Karttunen (cello), Tuija Hakkila (piano); Ondine 1189-2 (2012)
- Franz Schubert – Quintet in C major for 2 violins, viola and 2 cellos, D.956; Smithsonian Chamber Players; Sony Classical (1991)
- Louis Spohr: Octet, Sextet, Quintet; Smithsonian Chamber Players; Sony Classical (1993)

Double String Quartet No.1 in D minor, Op.65
String Sextet in C major, Op.140
String Quintet No.2 in G major "Grande Quintetto", Op.33 No.2

- Tōru Takemitsu – And Then I Knew 'Twas Wind for flute, viola and harp (1992); Robert Aitken (flute); Steven Dann (viola); Erica Goodman (harp); Naxos (2003)
- Mieczysław Weinberg – Piano Quintet, Op.18 (1944); ARC Ensemble; RCA Red Seal (2006)
