= Spitzner =

Spitzner is a surname of German origin. Notable persons with the surname include:

- Erwin Spitzner (born 1994), Brazilian soccer player
- Franz Ernst Heinrich Spitzner (1787–1841), German educator
- Renate Spitzner (born 1943), Austrian composer
- Václav Spitzner (1852–1907), Czech botanist
