= Marta Hidy =

Hungarian violinist (1927–2010)

Marta Iren Hidy
- Born: January 11, 1927; Budapest, Hungary
- Died: November 4, 2010 (aged 83) Hamilton, Ontario
- Instrument: Violin

Marta Iren Hidy (January 11, 1927 - November 4, 2010) was a Hungarian Canadian violinist, conductor and music teacher. In addition to being an accomplished musician, she was a founding member of the music program at McMaster University.

== Biography ==
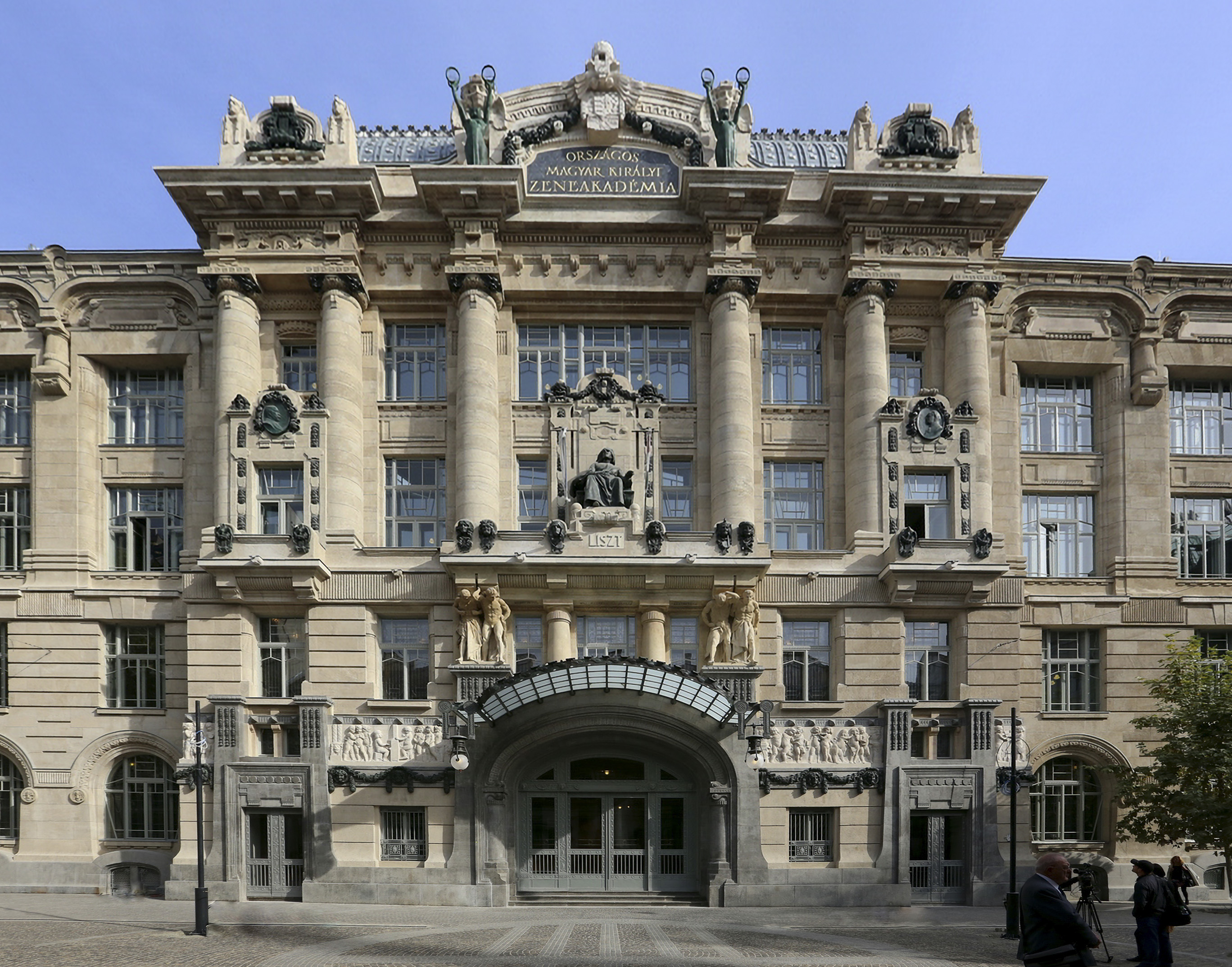
Franz Liszt Academy in Budapest

Marta Hidy was born in Budapest, Hungary on January 11, 1927. Her father was an economist and her mother, who enrolled Hidy at the Franz Liszt Academy at the age of six, was a violinist. While at the Academy Hidy was instructed by violinists Ferenc Gábriel and Ede Zathureczky and the composers Leó Weiner and Zoltán Kodály. At the age of 16 she was named outstanding violinist in an academy's Reményi Competition by a jury led by Ernő Dohnányi.

After graduating Hidy performed extensively on her own and as part of orchestral and chamber ensembles. She was a member of the Hungarian Radio Symphony Orchestra (1946–1951), headed a prize-winning string quartet at the 1950 Prague International Chamber Music Competition and from 1953 to 1957 was a Hungarian State Soloist performing internationally with orchestras in Czechoslovakia, Poland and Romania.

=== Immigration to Canada ===
On New Year's Eve, 1956, Hidy and her husband, Anton (Antal) Dvorak fled Hungary to Austria, with their two children, eventually emigrating to Canada. The family settled in Winnipeg, Manitoba in 1957 where Hidy worked as assistant concertmaster of the Winnipeg Symphony Orchestra and concertmaster of the CBC Winnipeg Orchestra, in addition to founding the Hidy String Quartet and the Hidy Trio. She made her Canadian concert debut in Toronto in 1962 and her trio, which included pianist Chester Duncan and cellist Klara Benjamin Belkin, recorded works by Dmitri Shostakovich at Expo 67's Canadian Pavilion.

In 1965 Hidy was invited to McMaster University by Lee Hepner, then head of the McMaster Operatic Society, where she became a founding member of the university's music program. (Note: Among the first four students to enroll in the program was director Ivan Reitman.) She taught at the school from its establishment until her retirement in 1991. Along with her teaching commitments at McMaster, Hidy served as concertmaster and assistant conductor of the Hamilton Philharmonic Orchestra (HPO) from 1965 to 1974; as the artistic director of the Philharmonic Children of Hamilton from 1967 to 1977; was the conductor of the Chamber Players of Toronto from 1977 to 1979; and was a founding member of the McMaster String Quartet, which she performed with from 1978 to 1989.

Hidy continued to perform throughout her career both alone and in the company of other accomplished musicians. In 1973 she was a founding member of the Hidy-Ozolins-Tsutsumi Trio. Comprising pianist Arthur Ozolins and cellist Tsuyoshi Tsutsumi, the trio toured Ontario and performed on the Canadian Broadcasting Corporation. The following year Hidy formed the Ensemble Sir Ernest MacMillan and in 1978 Hidy joined cellist Zdenek Konicek and pianist Valerie Tryon to form Trio Canada. Outside of her ensemble work, Hidy performed as a concerto soloist with the Toronto Symphony Orchestra, the Winnipeg Symphony Orchestra, the Hamilton Philharmonic and the Regina Symphony Orchestra and performed internationally in a solo capacity in countries including New Zealand, Hungary, Japan, China and Hong Kong.

Hidy died in Hamilton on November 4, 2010, of bone cancer. At the time of her death conductor Boris Brott, the music director of the HPO from 1969 to 1990, explained: "Marta was an extraordinary musician, a natural violinist, and a wonderful teacher, a person who exuded music from her every pore."

== Awards and honours ==
- Henryk Wieniawski Violin Competition (1952)
- Order of Merit of the Republic of Hungary (1993)
