= String Quartet No. 17 (Villa-Lobos) =

Villa-Lobos in June 1952

String Quartet No. 17 is the last of seventeen quartets by the Brazilian composer Heitor Villa-Lobos. Villa-Lobos composed his Seventeenth Quartet in Rio de Janeiro in 1957.

It was first performed by the Budapest String Quartet on 16 October 1959, at the Library of Congress in Washington, D.C., exactly one month before the composer's death. Villa-Lobos was too ill to attend. He had given a copy of the score to the violinist Mariuccia Iacovino in Paris, before returning to Rio, mortally ill. He repeatedly asked her to arrange a reading of it, but adverse circumstances prevented this, and he died without knowing the premiere had already taken place:

A typical performance lasts approximately 20 minutes.

== Analysis ==
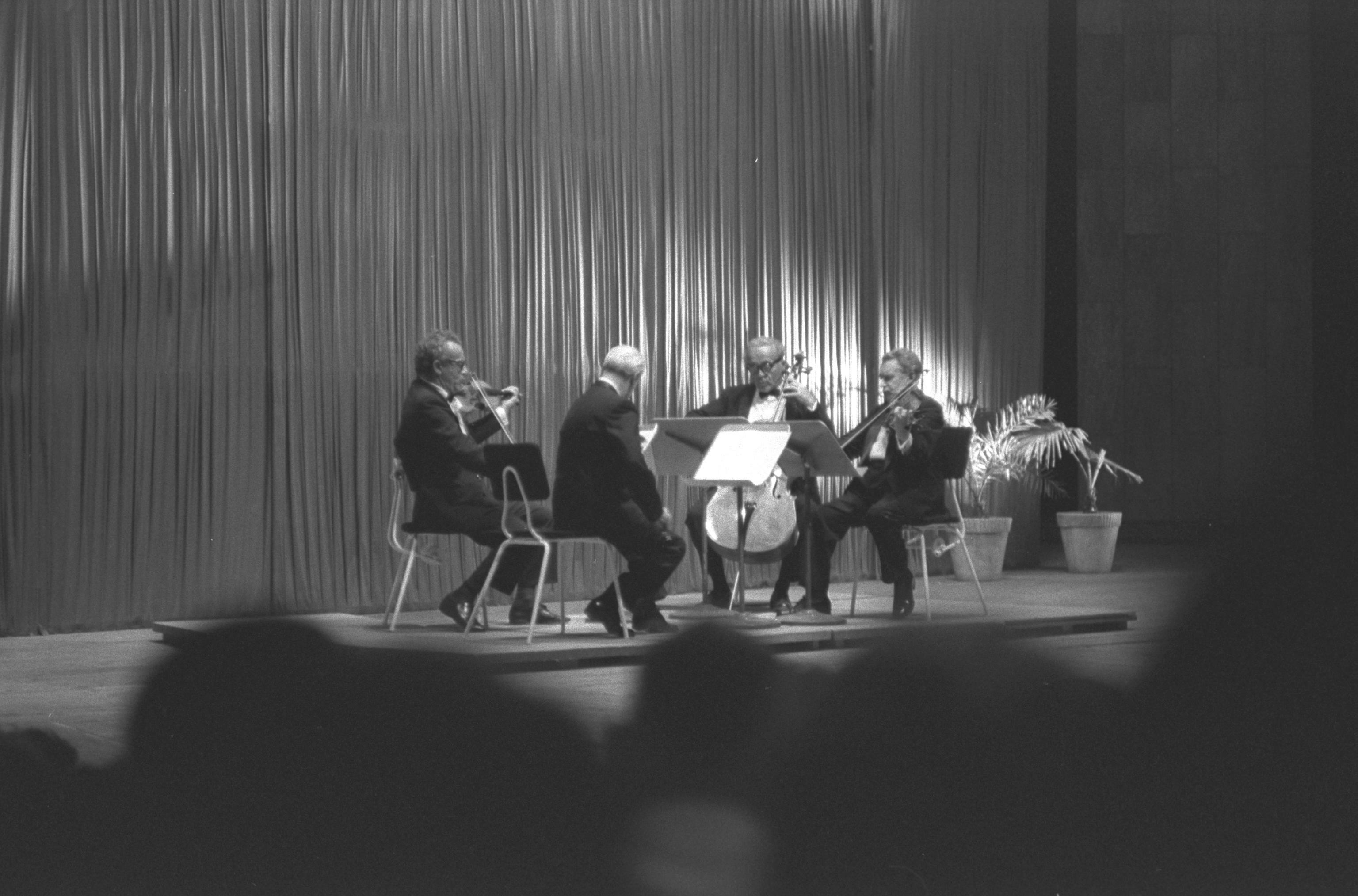
The Budapest String Quartet, who premiered the quartet

The quartet consists of the traditional four movements:

1. Allegro non troppo
2. Lento
3. Scherzo (Allegro vivace)
4. Allegro vivace (con fuoco)

The first movement is in ternary form, rather than the expected sonata-allegro form, and has a long concluding 37-measure coda.

The second movement is also in ternary form and has the character of the improvised instrumental serenade called a choro.

The third movement is a traditional scherzo with trio, followed by a concluding coda.

The finale breaks with traditional forms, offering instead a succession of three unrelated sections, a transition, and a recapitulation of the first half of section one, and an extended coda.

== Discography ==
Chronological, by date of recording.

- Heitor.Villa-Lobos: Na música de câmara. Quartets Nos. 1 and 17. Quarteto Rio de Janeiro. LP recording, 1 disc: analog, 33⅓ rpm, 12 in., stereo. [Rio de Janeiro]: Caravelle, [196-]
- Brazilian Quartets. Heitor Villa-Lobos: String Quartet No. 17; Alberto Nepomuceno: String Quartet No. 3 in D minor ("Brasileiro"). Brazilian String Quartet. LP recording, 1 disc, 12 in., 33⅓ rpm, stereo. CBS Masterworks 60141. Brazil: CBS Discos, 1967. Reissued on LP, Odyssey 32 16 0176. New York: Columbia Records, 1967.
  - Reissued on CD as part of Heitor Villa-Lobos: String Quartets nos. 1, 6, and 17. Quarteto Brasileiro da UFRJ. CD recording, 1 sound disc: digital, 12 cm, stereo. [S.l.]: Albany Records, p2005.
- Concurso Internacional de Quarteto de Cordas (1977: Rio de Janeiro). Heitor Villa-Lobos: String Quartets Nos. 16 and 17. Quarteto de Cuerdas de la Universidad Nacional de La Plata; Audubon Quartet. Recorded live at the Sala Cecília Meireles, Rio de Janeiro. LP recording, 1 sound disc: analog, 33⅓ rpm, 12 in. Tapecar MEC/DAC/CFC/MVL 020. Rio de Janeiro: Tapecar Gravações, 1977.
- Villa-Lobos: Quatuors a Cordes Nos. 15/16/17. Quatuor Bessler-Reis (Bernardo Bessler, Michel Bessler, violins; Marie-Christine Springuel, viola; Alceu Reis, cello). Recorded at Studios Master in Rio de Janeiro, August–November 1988. CD recording, 1 disc: digital, 12 cm, stereo. Le Chant du Monde LDC 278 948. [S.l.]: [S.n.], 1989.
  - Also issued as part of Villa-Lobos: Os 17 quartetos de cordas / The 17 String Quartets. Quarteto Bessler-Reis and Quarteto Amazônia. CD recording, 6 sound discs: digital, 12 cm, stereo. Kuarup Discos KCX-1001 (KCD 045, M-KCD-034, KCD 080/1, KCD-051, KCD 042). Rio de Janeiro: Kuarup Discos, 1996.
- Heitor Villa-Lobos: String Quartets Nos. 11, 16 and 17. Danubius Quartet (Judit Tóth and Adél Miklós, violins; Cecilia Bodolai, viola; Ilona Wibli, cello). Recorded at the Hungaroton Studios in Budapest, 15–16 October 1990, 28–30 January, and 11–15 February 1991. CD recording, 1 disc: digital, 12 cm, stereo. Marco Polo 8.223390. A co-production with Records International. Germany: HH International, Ltd., 1992.
- Villa-Lobos: String Quartets, Volume 1. Quartets Nos. 6, 1, 17. Cuarteto Latinoamericano (Saúl Bitrán, Arón Bitrán, violins; Javier Montiel, viola; Alvaro Bitrán, cello). Recorded at the Troy Savings Bank Music Hall in Troy, NY, April 1994. Music of Latin American Masters. CD recording, 1 disc: digital, 12 cm, stereo. Dorian DOR-90205. Troy, NY: Dorian Recordings, 1995.
  - Reissued as part of Heitor Villa-Lobos: The Complete String Quartets. 6 CDs + 1 DVD with a performance of Quartet No. 1 and interview with the Cuarteto Latinoamericano. Dorian Sono Luminus. DSL-90904. Winchester, VA: Sono Luminus, 2009.
  - Also reissued (without the DVD) on Brilliant Classics 6634.

== Filmography ==
- Villa-Lobos: A integral dos quartetos de cordas. Quarteto Radamés Gnattali (Carla Rincón, Francisco Roa, violins; Fernando Thebaldi, viola; Hugo Pilger, cello); presented by Turibio Santos. Recorded from June 2010 to September 2011 at the Palácio do Catete, Palácio das Laranjeiras, and the Theatro Municipal, Rio de Janeiro. DVD and Blu-ray (VIBD11111), 3 discs. Rio de Janeiro: Visom Digital, 2012.
