= Ana Chumachenco =

Italian violinist (born 1945)

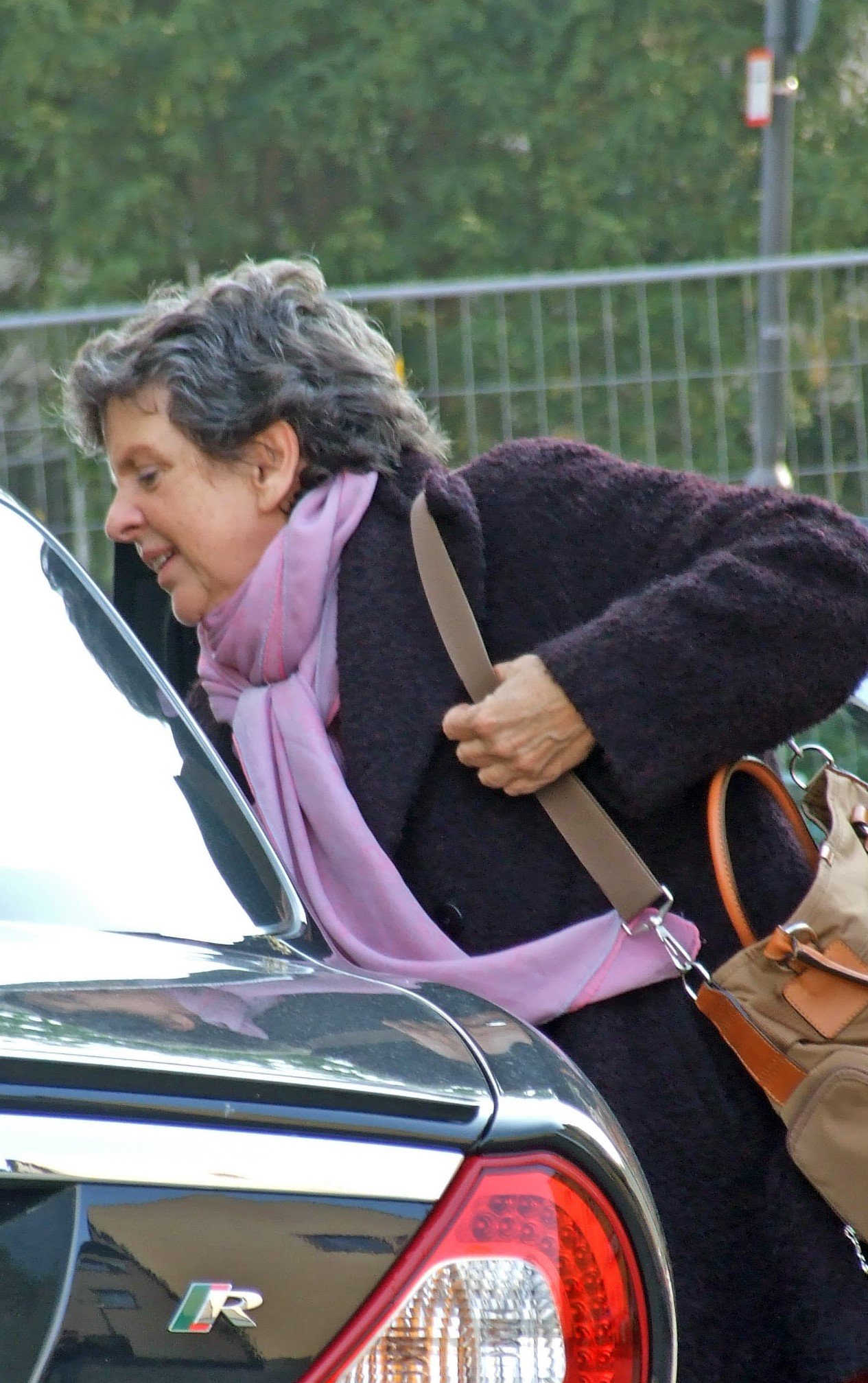
- Chumachenco in 2009

Background information
- Born: Ana Chumachenco; 23 June 1945 (age 80); Padua, Italy
- Genres: Classical
- Occupations: Violinist, pedagogue
- Instrument: Violin
- Years active: 1963–present

Ana Chumachenco is an Italian born violinist of Argentinian, Ukrainian, and German descent.

== Biography ==
Ana Chumachenco was born in Padua, Italy, on 23 June 1945. From the age of four, Chumachenco practiced violin under the guidance of her father, a former student of Hungarian violinist Leopold Auer. She completed her studies in Buenos Aires under Ljerko Spiller and, until the age of 17, lived in South America. In 1963 at the age of 18, she moved to Europe where she would continue her violin studies and, in the same year, won the gold medal of the Carl Flesch Competition in London. Chumachenco went on to win a silver medal for her participation in the Queen Elisabeth Music Competition in Brussels, at the same time taking lessons with Yehudi Menuhin, Joseph Szigeti, and Sandor Vegh.

Currently, Chumachenco plays with Oscar Lysy and Walter Notas and is a violin professor at the Kronberg Academy, the Hochschule für Musik und Theater München and she holds master classes at the Music Academy Accademia Lorenzo Perosi in Biella. She also works as a juror for the International Jean Sibelius Violin Competition in Helsinki and the Queen Elisabeth Music Competition in Belgium.

Her brother Nicolas Chumachenco was also a violinist and professor.

== Awards ==
- 1989 Merit Diploma Konex Award
- 1999 Platinum Konex Award as the best Bow Instrument Performer of the decade in Argentina
- 2007 Cross of the Order of Merit of the Federal Republic of Germany
