= Ania Safonova =

Russian musician

Ania Safonova (Hebrew: אניה ספונובה, Russian: Аня Сафонова) is a Russian-Israeli violinist, the Associate Concertmaster of the Royal Opera House, Covent Garden. She has recently been appointed as Director of the ManningCamerata Chamber Players.

== Biography ==
Safonova was born in Tomsk, Russia and began her violin studies at the age of five with Svetlana Goffman. She made her solo debut at the age of six with the Omsk Philharmonic Orchestra and the following year was a prizewinner at the Novosibirsk Violin Competition.

In 1990, her family emigrated to Israel where she studied at the Tel Aviv Conservatoire, playing as a soloist with the Tel Aviv Conservatoire Orchestra and the Young Israel Philharmonic Orchestra.]. She was a member of the Mishkenot Sha'ananim Israel Chamber Music Unit (1991–1995), She won regular scholarships from the America-Israel Cultural Foundation and recorded for German Radio.

In 1996, she came to the UK and attained a full scholarship to study at the Purcell School of Music with Felix Andrievsky, followed by four years at the Royal College of Music (1997–2001) with Andrievsky and Yossi Zivoni

== Career ==
Safonova was the associate Leader of the Halle Orchestra in Manchester from 2001 to 2006, and in 2008, was appointed Associate Concertmaster of the Royal Opera House, Covent Garden. She has performed at numerous concert series and festivals across the world, with ensembles such as the Nash Ensemble, London Bridge Ensemble, Razumovsky Ensemble and Fibonacci Sequence. Her most recent appointment has been as Director of the ManningCamerata Chamber Players.

Scholarships and Awards

- Queen Elizabeth the Queen Mother Scholarship
- English Speaking Union Tanglewood Scholarship
- Martin Musical Trust
- Worshipful Company of Musicians
- Maise Lewis Award (1999 Wigmore Hall debut)
- Kirkman Society (2003 Purcell Room debut)
- Winner of the Eastbourne Young Soloists Competition and soloist with the Royal Conservatory of Music Orchestra and the Halle Orchestra.

Role as Concertmaster

- Halle Orchestra
- BBC National Orchestra of Wales
- BBC Symphony Orchestra
- Scottish Chamber Orchestra
- Ulster Orchestra
- Aurora Orchestra
- Royal Liverpool Philharmonic
- Swedish Radio Symphony Orchestra
- Canterbury Cathedral Orchestra
- Jerusalem Festival Orchestra
- Schleswig-Holstin Festival Orchestra
- Arpeggione Chamber Orchestra (Austria)
