= Lillian Shattuck =

American musician (1857–1940)

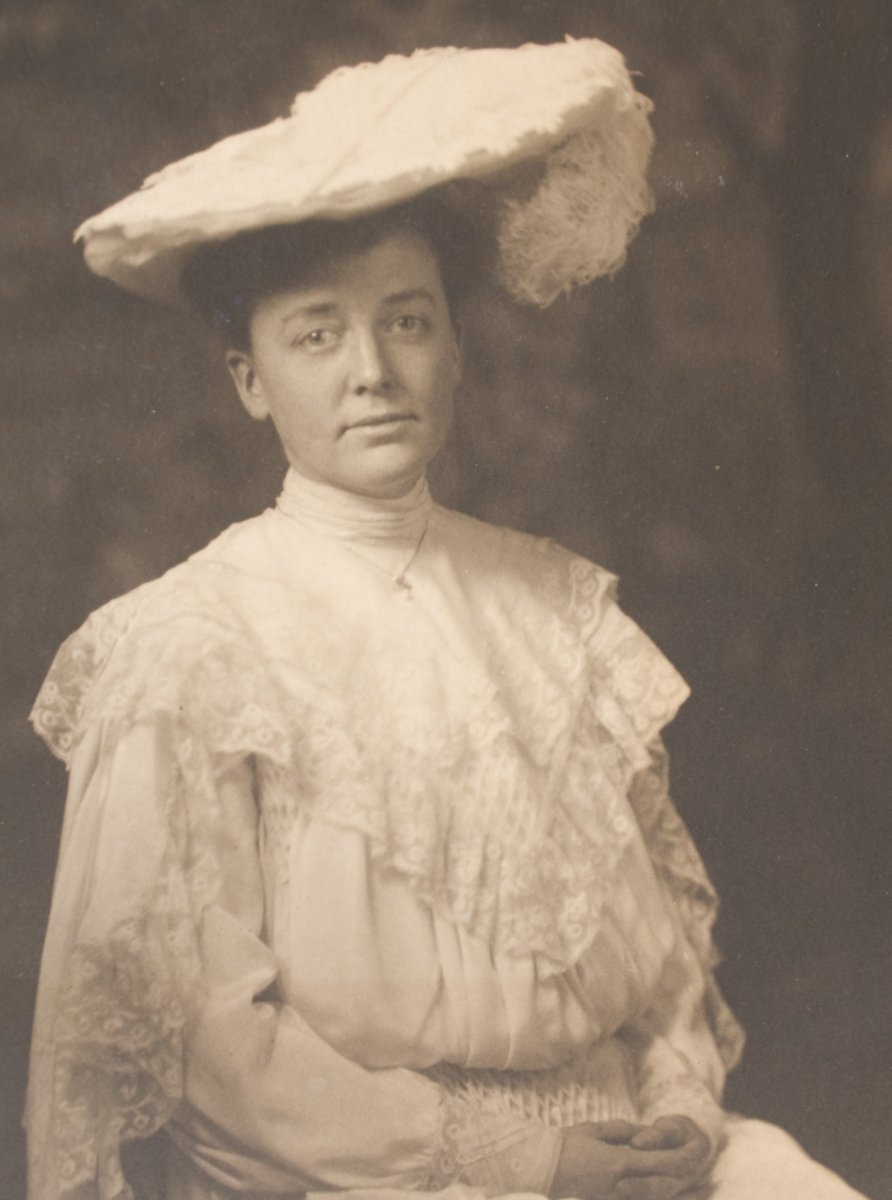
Lillian Shattuck

Lillian Shattuck (1857–1940) was an early American violinist. A student of Julius Eichberg in Boston, in the late 1880s she established a string quartet consisting only of women, the first of its kind in the United States. The other members of the quartet were Lillian Chandler, violin, Leslie Launder, cello and Abbie Shepardson, viola.

They performed together in chamber concerts in New York, Massachusetts and Philadelphia. One was held in November 1877 in Boston's Union Hall. It included Eichberg's Concertante for Four Violins as well as other pieces by Haydn and Mendelssohn. Shattuck was among those who travelled with Eichberg and members of the quartet to study in Berlin. Joseph Joachim was so surprised to see a quartet consisting only of women that he allowed all four to attend the Conservatory and study under him for a whole year.

In the 1890s, the quartet performed in the southern states and Canada. Shattuck later returned to Boston where she established a music school. A scrapbook belonging to Shattuck with over 200 photographs of her violin students is to be found in the Schlesinger Library.
