= Cecile Stevens =

Australian violinist

Cecile Stevens LRAM
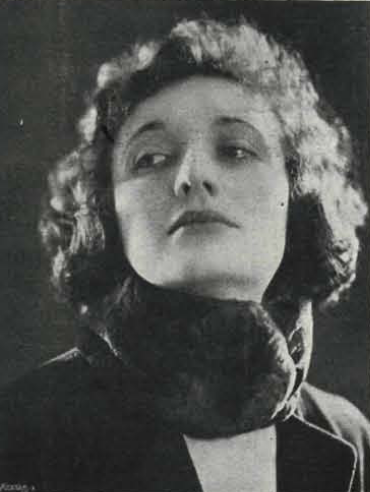
- Cecile Stevens, from a 1922 publication
- Born: Cecile Ann Stevens; 1896; Sydney
- Died: 9 October 1970 (aged 73–74)
- Other name: Cecile Molloy (married name)
- Education: Royal Academy of Music
- Occupation: Violinist

Cecile Ann Stevens Molloy LRAM (1896 – 9 October 1970) was an Australian violinist.

== Early life ==
Stevens was from Sydney, daughter of composer and organist John Michael Stevens and Kathleen Mary Noonan Stevens. As a child musician, she was conductor of the Parramatta Convention Orchestra in Sydney. She won a scholarship to attend the Royal Academy of Music in London.

== Career ==
Stevens played a Nicola Amati violin, a gift from her father. She played for Princess Mary and entertained wounded troops while performing in Great Britain during World War I, sometimes sharing the bill with Lena Ashwell. She made a two-year tour of English vaudeville theatres.

She toured in Canada and the United States after the war, and toured in Australia and New Zealand in 1921. "Miss Cecile Stevens is a talented young violinist with a distinguished grace and charm characteristic of her wonderful ability," noted a New Zealand newspaper. She gave radio concerts and made recordings, including a film, in the United States in 1922. She returned to London in the early 1920s, and played in London theatres. After she married in 1929, she moved to East Africa.

== Personal life ==
Stevens married Michael Aloysius Molloy in 1929, in London. She lived with her husband, an Irish veterinary officer, in Tanganyika Territory, at least until he retired in 1950.

Stevens died in Sydney on 9 October 1970 and was survived by her husband.
