= Catherine Plunkett =

Irish musician (born c.1725)

Catherine Plunkett (c. 1725 – ?) was an Irish violinist.

== Biography ==
She was born in Dublin, c. 1725. Plunkett studied with Matthew Dubourg and performed in London and Dublin about 1744. She was one of the very few Irish women to perform as a violinist on stage in the eighteenth century. Very little more is known about her.

In 1818, a Stradivarius cello was bought by Mr Alan Dowell, the "son of Ms. Catherine Plunkett". This "Irish" cello turned up in London and is now owned by Carlos Prieto.
