= Rebeca Nuez Suarez =

Spanish classical violinist (born 1996)

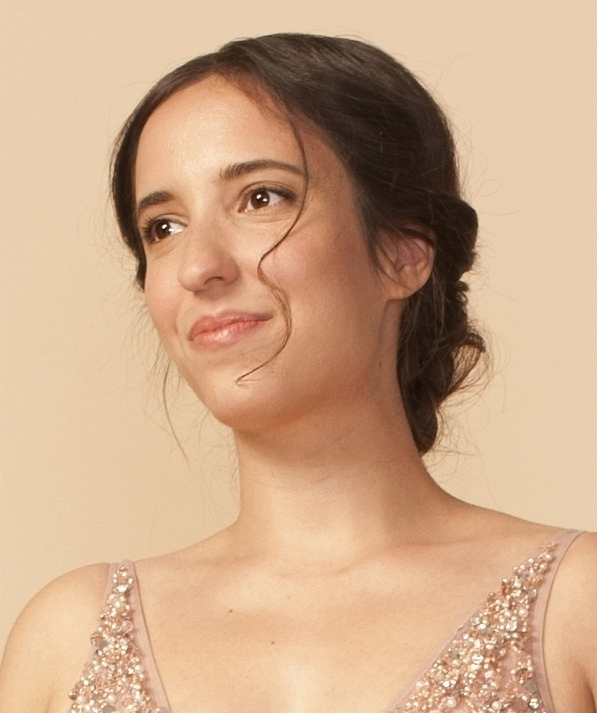
- Nuez Suarez in 2021
- Born: 10 November 1998 (age 26); Las Palmas de Gran Canaria, Spain
- Education: Guildhall School of Music and Drama, Royal College of Music
- Occupation: Violinist
- Years active: 2008–present
- Website: www.rebecanuezsuarez.com

Rebeca Nuez Suarez (born November 10, 1998), is a Spanish classical violinist.

== Early life ==
Nuez Suarez was born in Las Palmas de Gran Canaria into a family of musicians, she started her musical training with her father when she was three years old, and she began her violin studies with her uncle when she turned six years old. Her uncle, and aunt are both professional violinists and members of the Orquesta Filarmónica de Gran Canaria, the main symphony orchestra in the Canary Islands and resident orchestra of the Auditorio Alfredo Kraus, in Gran Canaria.

On stage since the age of seven, Nuez Suarez has been performing publicly from the beginning of her musical training. She made her solo debut when she was fourteen years old with the Joven Orquesta de Gran Canaria under Zdzislaw Tytlak.

Her parents became members of diverse folk music groups that explored traditional music from the Canary Islands, and they encouraged their daughter to take part in many of their concerts during her teenage years.

== Career and education ==
Rebeca Nuez Suarez lived in Las Palmas de Gran Canaria and trained as a violinist under the guidance of her uncle at the Academia de la Orquesta Filarmónica de Gran Canaria while attending middle school and high school.

Nuez Suarez moved to the Netherlands when she turned seventeen to continue her education at Codarts University for the Arts (Rotterdam). She later joined the Conservatorium Maastricht, where she graduated and obtained her Bachelor Diploma. She moved to London to continue her education as a postgraduate student at the Royal College of Music. Nuez Suarez was awarded a scholarship from La Caixa Banking Foundation Fellowships Programme in support of her study at the Royal College of Music.

In May 2017, Nuez Suarez performed as a guest artist at the annual Cinémoi charity gala in Cannes, during the 70th edition of the Cannes Film Festival. She has performed in several countries, including Germany, China, Czech Republic, Spain, Italy, France and the Netherlands.

Nuez Suarez has stated she is interested in contemporary classical music and collaborating with composers that are currently working. In 2018 her recording of the piece “Alone” for violin solo, by Spanish composer Laura Vega, was digitally released worldwide .

In 2018 Young Classicals, a non-profit cultural platform which promotes young soloists in Europe, collaborated with Nuez Suarez to record her performances of works by Eugene Ysaÿe and Maurice Ravel.

In November 2019, Nuez Suarez released the music video "The Furies", featuring her recording of the fourth movement of the Eugene Ysaÿe's Violin Sonata Nr. 2, originally named Les Furies. "The Furies" became the first classical music video by a Spanish artist to feature in Vevo. Nuez Suarez made history emerging as the first Spanish classical musician to appear in this platform. She was highlighted that year by Melómano Digital as an artist "paving a new way in the outreach of classical music".

Nuez Suarez started a performance doctoral degree in London at the Guildhall School of Music and Drama. From 2023, she joined the doctoral programme at the School of Music in the University of Leeds. Her doctoral project was awarded a British Spanish Society award in 2022.

She was selected as one of BBC Music Magazine’s Rising Stars in Summer of 2023. In 2024 she won the 'Best Classical' artist category at the Premios Canarios de la Música. She was nominated for the same award in 2023.

In December 2016, Nuez Suarez was briefly attached to a film in development by British film director Brian Skeet, titled “The Spanish Version”. An undisclosed health issue prevented Skeet from further developing the project, which was shelved shortly after.

At the 70th edition of the Cannes Film Festival Skeet said of her: “I truly believe the passion she shows for her music will be translated in film. [...] We celebrate new talent and new faces, and I can say I cannot think of anyone I want to celebrate more than this young artist”.
