= Viktoria Grigoreva =

Ukrainian musician

- Вікторія Григор’єва
- Born: Kharkiv, Ukrainian SSR, Soviet Union
- Occupation: Classical violinist

Viktoria Grigoreva (Note: Ukrainian: Вікторія Григор’єва, romanized: Viktoriia Hryhorieva, sometimes given as Grigorjova) is a Ukrainian violinist born in Kharkiv.

== Early life ==
Grigoreva began attending Specialist Music School in Kharkov at age seven. By age eleven she had performed Mozart's Fifth Violin Concerto along with Kharkov Chamber Orchestra. Following this, she attended and then graduated from Gnessin State Musical College where her teacher was Semion Mikitiansky. She continued on her studies with Irina Grebneva.

== Career ==
She had success with in Kharkov State Philharmonic in Eastern Europe and went on to become a professor of its conservatory. She has performed works by Mozart, Prokofiev, Shostakovich, Sibelius, Skoryk, Sylvestrov and Wieniawski. She appeared on Ukrainian television with the National Symphony Orchestra of Ukraine and Kharkov Philharmonic. By 1996 she settled in London where she performed at Wigmore Hall and played Valentine Silvestrov's piano works for the British premiere.

She performs at various music festivals such as the Austrian Euro Arts and Young Virtuosi Festival of France, as well as English New Virtuosi and various performances in Sweden and Ukraine. She works as a director of the Tsukanov Scholarship Fund and is a teacher at the Royal College of Music. Many of her students were Wieniawsky, RCMJD, and Martin Musical Competition winners. During her teaching career she was a visiting professor at both Specialist Music School of Sweden and Ukraine and also held posts at London College of Music and Rikkyo School.
