= Ede Zathureczky =

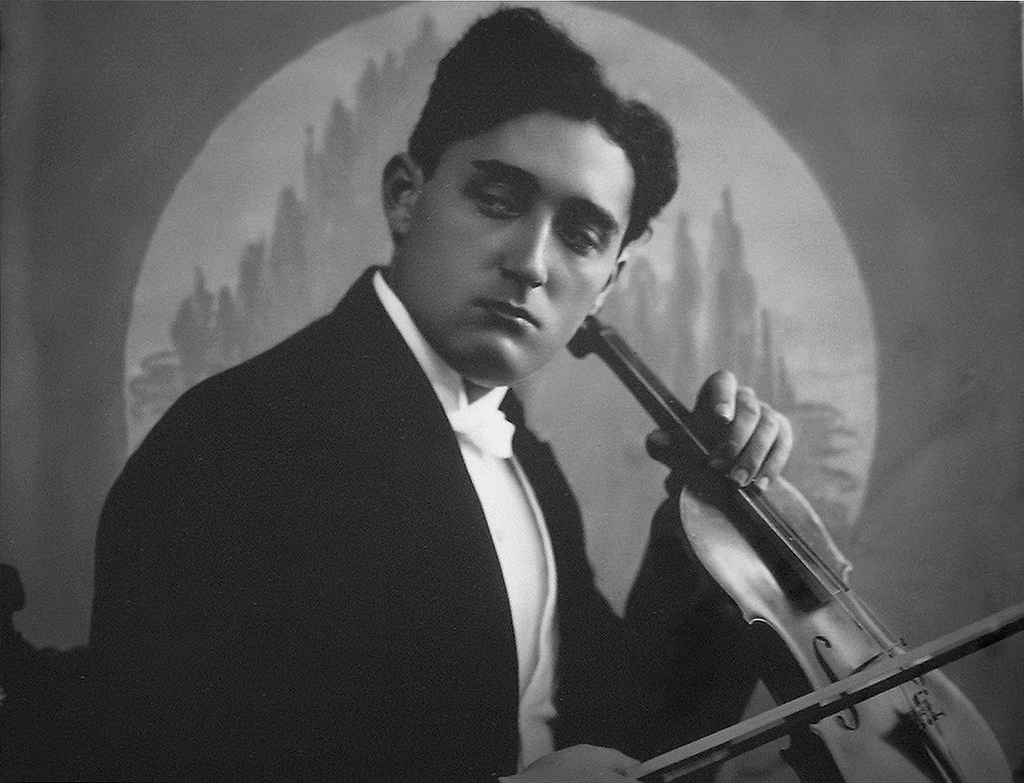
- Ede Zathureczky, a family collection young portrait (1924)

Background information
- Birth name: Ede Zathureczky
- Born: 24 August 1903; Igló, Hungary (now Spišská Nová Ves, Slovakia)
- Died: 31 May 1959 (aged 55); Bloomington, Indiana, USA
- Genres: Classical
- Occupation(s): Violinist, pedagogue
- Instrument: Violin
- Years active: 1920–1959

Ede Zathureczky (Igló, 24 August 1903 – Bloomington, 31 May 1959) was a Hungarian violin virtuoso and pedagogue.

== Life and career ==
Ede Zathureczky was born in Igló, Kingdom of Hungary (now Spišská Nová Ves in Slovakia). His teacher was the exceptional Jenő Hubay. In 1920 he started playing concerts in Austria, Holland, Switzerland, Italy, Bohemia, Poland, Scandinavian countries and many cities around the world.

In 1929 he became Hubay's assistant and later the music director at the Liszt Academy in Budapest. It is here that he performed frequently with his colleague, pianist Bela Nagy.

The final few years of his life he taught at Indiana University, where both Nagy and Menahem Pressler were also on the faculty.

Ede Zathurecky played a concert with Béla Bartók at the hall of the Korona Hotel in Nyíregyháza on 10 January 1934. From 1943 to 1957 he was the director of the Budapest Music Academy.

== Recordings ==
Zathurecky did not leave any commercial recordings; however, tapes of duets with Ernő Dohnányi made in the older Hungarian's Tallahassee home in the late 1950s just before Zathurecky's sudden death have been issued on CD, consisting of Mozart's K.304, Beethoven's Op 30 No 3, Op 24 and Kreutzer, Op 47, along with Schumann's second sonata.
