= Mariuccia Iacovino =

Brazilian musician (1912–2008)

- 1968
- Born: 12 December 1912; Rio de Janeiro, Brazil
- Died: 16 May 2008 (aged 95); Rio de Janeiro, Brazil
- Other names: Mariuccia Iacovino Valls Estrela
- Occupation: violinist
- Years active: 1924–2008

Mariuccia Iacovino (12 December 1912 – 16 May 2008) was a Brazilian violinist and instructor. A child prodigy on the violin, she studied in Brazil and Spain and performed internationally. At the end of World War II, she moved to Paris and performed as a soloist with the Cologne Orchestra. In 1964, she and the Quarteto da Guanabara received the first prize from the international Villa-Lobos String Quartet Competition and in 1966, she was awarded the Carlos Gomes Medal in Rio de Janeiro.

== Early life ==
Mariuccia Iacovino was born on 12 December 1912 in Rio de Janeiro, Brazil. She began studying music at a young age and by the time she was six years old, had passed the examinations to enter the Instituto Nacional de Música. In 1924, when the school created its orchestra, now known as the Federal University of Rio de Janeiro Symphony Orchestra, Iacovino played in the premier performance, along with Iberê Gomes Grosso and Oscar Borgerth, under the direction of Francisco Braga. Studying violin under the master violinist Paulina d'Ambrósio, Iacovino graduated at age fifteen, having won the gold medal. In 1928, she traveled to Barcelona, Spain to continue her studies with Enrique Fernández Arbós and Màrius Mateo. She spent a year touring and studying in Spain before returning to Brazil to study with d'Ambrósio and Heitor Villa-Lobos. While studying with Villa-Lobos, Iacovino met the noted pianist Arnaldo Estrela, whom she would marry.

== Career ==
In the 1930s, Iacovino performed with Edoardo de Guarnieri and Alfredo Gomes and taught at the Lorenzo Fernandez Academy of Music in Rio de Janeiro. She founded and became the director of the Quartet Society in 1943, heading the organization to 1947. At the end of World War II, Estrela was invited to move to Paris and he and Iacovino relocated there in 1945 along with their daughter Myrian Dauelsberg. The duo Iacovino-Estrela performed throughout Europe making numerous trips to the Soviet Union, also performing in Angola, China, and often in Poland and Portugal. In 1949, she was hired as the soloist of the Cologne Orchestra in Paris, which was under Villa-Lobos's direction at that time. She performed in the debut of his Fantasia de Movimentos Místicos (Fantasy of Mystical Movements), considered Villa-Lobos's most complex work for violins. In 1952 she attended the Congress of the People for Peace held in Vienna, (Note: Araújo indicates this Congress was held in Warsaw; however, Neruda was not involved in the planning of the Warsaw Congress of 1950, he was a recipient of the World Peace Council's Peace Prize, along with Pablo Picasso. The 1952 Congress in Vienna was planned by Neruda, Jorge Amado, Ilya Ehrenburg and Nicolas Guillén.) along with Estrela, Jorge Amado and Candido Portinari. The attendance at this Congress would later create problems during the McCarthy Era, when Iacovino was denied a visa to perform in the United States.

In 1954, the couple returned to Brazil and founded the Guanabara Quartet. Besides Iacovino and Estrela, the other two members were Iberê Gomes Grosso on cello and Frederick Stephany on viola. Traveling throughout Europe, the quartet played fifty-two concerts, featuring music by Brazilian composers, which were well received. In 1964, they were honored with the first prize in the international Villa-Lobos String Quartet Competition. Two years later, Iacovino received the Carlos Gomes Medal in Rio de Janeiro. In 1968, she became the first violinist to record the Violin Sonata in A-major, Op. 14 by Leopoldo Miguéz. That same year, she co-founded the Sociedade Villa Lobos (Villa Lobos Society), with her husband and Lourdes Tornaghi to promote concert performances in Petrópolis.

Between 1969 and 1979, during the military dictatorship the quartet was unable to travel and regularly played at the Municipal Theatre of Rio de Janeiro. Preferring to play to live audiences, Iacovino did record six CDs. Some of her most noted recordings include Camargo Guarnieri's Sonata No. 4; Miguéz's sonata; and Três Sonatas para Violino (Three Sonatas for Violin), Duo para Violino e Viola (Duo for Violin and Viola), Trio de Cordas (String Trio) and Chôros bis, all by Villa-Lobos. Iacovino continued performing until shortly before her death and the length of her career was at one time a record holder in The Guinness Book of World Records.

== Death and legacy ==
Iacovino died peacefully at her home in Rio de Janeiro on 16 May 2008. Since the creation of the Villa Lobos Society, more than 500 concerts have been held in Petrópolis. Numerous artists, including Camargo Guarnieri, Radamés Gnattali, Francisco Mignone, Ronaldo Miranda, Marlos Nobre, Almeida Prado and Alexandre Schubert wrote works in her honor. A youth orchestra in Campos is named in her honor. The Mariuccia Iacovino Symphony Orchestra has played throughout Brazil and toured in the United States.
