= Renate Spitzner =

Czech violinist (born 1943)

Renate Spitzner (born 28 May 1943 in Prague, Czech Republic) is an Austrian composer (member of the "OeGZM" – Austrian Society of contemporary music), musician, music pedagogue, music therapist and founder of the "Music-social Method" – "Musisch-soziale Methode". Spitzner studied violin, organ, piano, trumpet, music education and music therapy. She absolved the University of Music at Vienna.

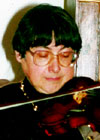
Prof.Renate Spitzner with Violin

At her work at the psychiatric hospital "Baumgartnerhöhe" in Vienna, Austria, she developed the "Music-social Method" in which patients and professional musician play together. For that common play-together music pieces of the classic period are specially adapted or also new composed. First time the "Music-social method" has been recognized and approved at the "United Nations Decade of Disabled Persons 1983–1992". Spitzner is the mother of the Austrian composer Gerald Spitzner.

== Awards ==
Artistic recognition through the Czechoslovak Republic, first performance of the composition "Praha" for Violinsolo on the occasion of the opening from the Czechoslovak Expo-pavilion from Brussels in Prague (see the Czechoslovak TV, live-recording). To the occasion of the 50th anniversary of the centre the Austrian Republic

honored Prof. Renate Spitzner 2001 at the "UN-Year of the volunteer" with the 1. prize for Cultural and social engagement. 2006: Silver badge of honor – "Silbernes Ehrenzeichen", conferred on 20 September 2006 by the councilwoman for health of Vienna, Mag. Renate Brauner, for development and realisation of the "Music-social Method" during years.

== Works (selection) ==
- In occasion to the UN-Year of the dolphin: "Dolphin 1–10 for Violin and Piano" – "Delphin 1–10 für Violine it – 800 Jahre Hl. Elisabeth"
- "Encounter at the font" – "Begegnung am Brunnen", (2006, townhall of Vienna, emblemshall in occasion of honor for the lifework of composer Prof.Renate Spitzner)
- "620 short masses for ill people – Kyrie, Offertorium, Communion" – "620 Kurzmessen für Kranke – Kyrie, Gabenbereitung, Kommunion"
- "Hope für Violin and Viola" – "Hoffnung für Violine und Viola", (ÖGZM, Haydnhall, University of Music, Vienna)

== Literature ==
- Renate Spitzner; Gerald Spitzner:"Musical practice – mechanical, substitutable virtuosity or living possible applications at the rehabilitation" – "Musikalische Praxis – maschinell ersetzbares Virtuosentum oder lebendige Einsatzmöglichkeiten in der Rehabilitation?", in: Hans Georg Zapotoczky(Editor): "Human being, Might, Machine"-"Mensch, Macht, Maschine", Innsbruck, Vienna, Verlag Integrative Psychiatrie 1995, ISBN 3-85184-012-7, p. 172-
- Prof. Renate Spitzner: "Integration through musictherapy" – "Integration durch Musiktherapie" in: Federal ministry of social affairs (Editor)-Bundesministerium für soziale Sicherheit und Generationen: "Faces of charity, what Austrian man and women do voluntary for others", Vienna 2001, p. 42 – "Gesichter der Menschlichkeit. Was Österreicherinnen und Österreicher freiwillig für andere tun"Wien 2001, S. 42. –
- "Festschrift at the 30th death-day of Rudolf Spitzner", 2005 – "Festschrift zum 30. Todestag von Rudolf Spitzner", 2005 –
- Speech at auditorium A of the psychiatric University hospital of Vienna -"Vortrag im Hörsaal A der Uniklinik des AKH Wien": "Used time of oppression – a curriculum of the Music-social Method comes into being" (explanation of the "Furtwängleric composition triangle"), 2 November 2007, DGPA-congress (German Society of Art and psychopathology of expression -"Genutzte Zeit der Unterdrückung – ein Lehrplan der Musisch-sozialen Methode entsteht" (Erläuterung des Furtwänglerschen Kompositionsdreieckes), 2 November 2007
