= Erika Raum =

Canadian musician

Erika Raum is a Canadian violinist.

== Biography ==
Raum began playing professionally at age 12. She took first place at the 1992 Joseph Szigeti International Violin Competition in Budapest as well as the award for best interpretation of a Mozart concerto.

Raum is a graduate of the University of Toronto, where she studied with Lorand Fenyves and was awarded the Eaton Scholarship upon her graduation. She was also a recipient of the Canada Council Career Development Grant.

She has performed in Hungary, Portugal, Austria, Germany, England, Italy, and France. She has appeared as a guest with the Budapest Radio Orchestra, the Szombathely Symphony Orchestra, the Austro-Hungarian Orchestra, and the Franz Liszt Chamber Orchestra.

Both a recitalist and chamber musician, Raum also performs frequently in Canada, including at Ottawa Chamberfest and the Banff Centre for Arts and Creativity. She has also performed at the Pablo Casals Festival in Prades and the Seattle Chamber Music Festival. In 2003, she and pianist Lydia Wong gave the North American premiere of Krzysztof Penderecki's Violin Sonata No. 2 in Toronto.

In 1993 composer Elizabeth Raum, her mother, wrote a violin concerto for her entitled Faces of Woman. The work was commissioned by the Regina Symphony Orchestra. Erika Raum's sister, Jessica Raum, produced and directed a documentary of the event, Like Mother, Like Daughter.

Raum and pianist Anton Kuerti recorded Carl Czerny's piano and violin works in 2002 on Musica Viva of CBC Records. Raum has released several recordings on the Arktos label, including a CD of the Brahms Horn Trio with David Hoyt and Janet Scott Hoyt and the premiere of Pantheon by Elizabeth Raum.

Raum is on the faculties of The Glenn Gould School and the University of Toronto Faculty of Music. She has also been on the summer faculty of the Banff Centre for the Arts.
