= Lorand Fenyves =

Canadian violinist

Lorand Fenyves (February 20, 1918 – March 23, 2004) was a Hungarian-born Canadian violinist and professor, based primarily at the University of Toronto.
