= Concerto for Two Violins and String Orchestra (Arnold) =

Op. 77 by Malcolm Arnold

The Concerto for Two Violins and String Orchestra, Op. 77 by Malcolm Arnold was finished in 1962. It is in three movements:

1. Allegro risoluto
2. Andantino
3. Vivace – Presto

The work was commissioned by Yehudi Menuhin for him and his pupil Alberto Lysy. They premiered the work during the Bath International Music Festival on 24 June 1962 at the Bath Guildhall. The Bath Festival Orchestra was conducted by the composer.

The first London performance was given by Menuhin and Robert Masters, with the Bath Festival Orchestra, and was also conducted by the composer.

== Selected commercial recordings ==
- Alan Loveday and Frances Mason, London Philharmonic Orchestra, conductor Malcolm Arnold, BBC Radio Classics 15656 91817
- Alberto Lysy and Sophia Reuter, Camerata Lysy, conductor Yehudi Menuhin, Dinemec DCCD 001
- Igor Gruppman and Vesna Gruppman, San Diego Chamber Orchestra, conductor Donald Barra, Koch 37134-2
- Kenneth Sillito and Lyn Fletcher, London Musici, conductor Mark Stephenson, Decca 4765343
- Peter McHugh and Paul Kling, Louisville Orchestra conductor Robert Whitney, First Edition FECD1904
