= Natalya Boyarskaya =

Russian violinist and music teacher (1946–2025)

Natalya Konstantinovna Boyarskaya (Russian: Ната́лья Константи́новна Боя́рская; 1946 – 19 December 2025) was a Russian violinist and music teacher. She was the wife of the cellist Alexander Boyarsky and mother of the violist Konstantin Boyarsky.

== Life and career ==
Boyarskaya studied violin at Moscow Conservatory Music College under Maya Glezarova and Yuri Yankelevich and later graduated from Felix Andrievsky's class at Gnessin State Musical College. From 1971 to 1990, she taught at the junior department of Moscow Conservatory Music College, heading the Strings Department there. In 1991, at the invitation of Yehudi Menuhin, she moved to London and began teaching at Yehudi Menuhin School.

From 1996, she was a professor at the Royal College of Music. Her students included Alina Ibragimova (Russia); Valeriy Sokolov (Ukraine); Akiko Ono (Japan), Vlad Majstorovic and Corina Belcea Fisher (Romania); Chloë Hanslip, Ben Baker and Nicola Benedetti (UK); Saule Rinkyavichyute (Lithuania); Emmanuelle Bernard (France); Aisha Syed Castro (Dominican Republic), Margarita Buesa (Spain), Anna Zlotovskaya (Germany) and Gala Pérez Iñesta (Spain).

Boyarskaya died on 19 December 2025 at the age of 79.
