= Ilya Itin =

Russian pianist (born 1967)

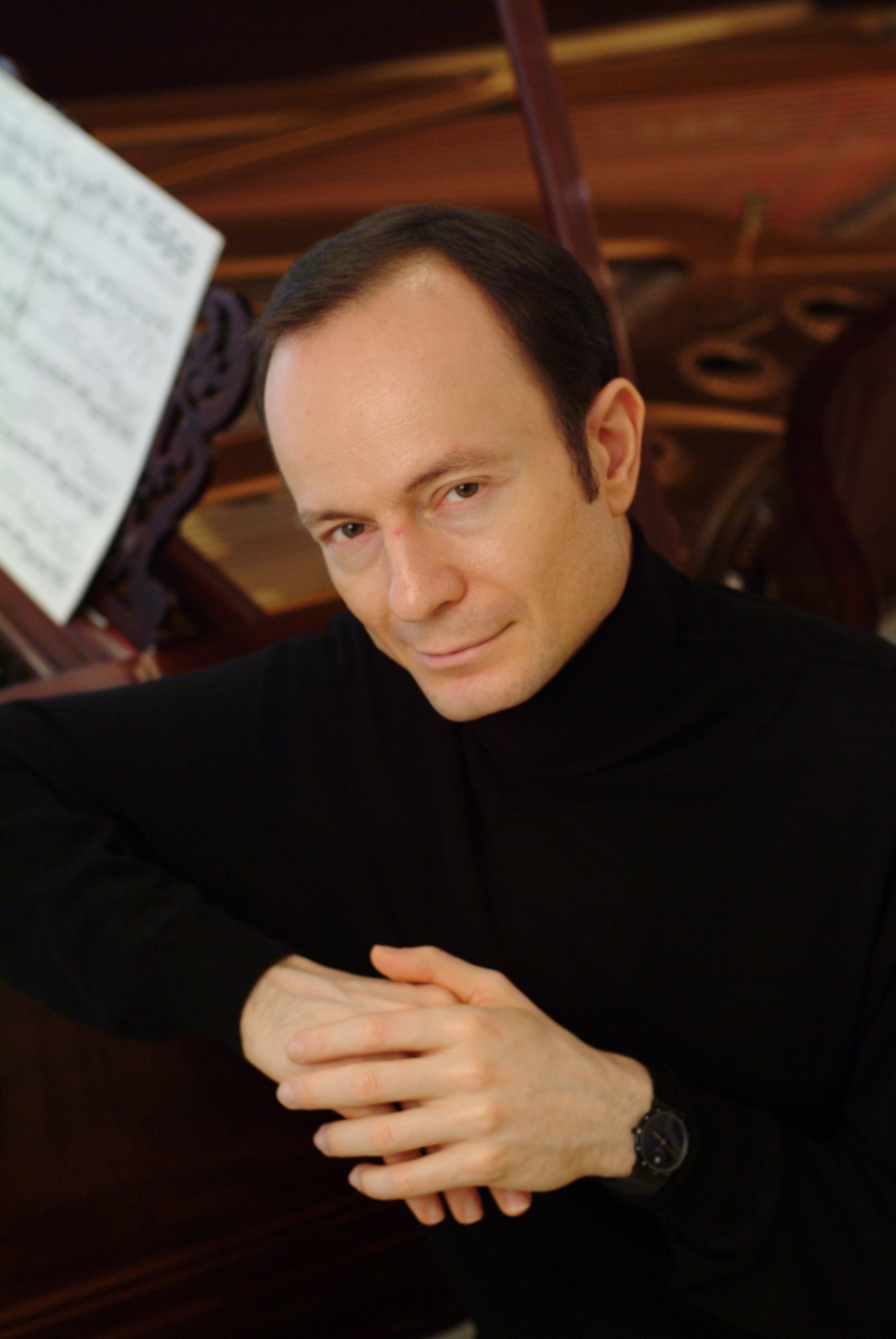
- Born: 3 April 1967 (age 59)
- Occupation: Classical pianist
- Awards: Leeds International Piano Competition; 1996 Gold medal Contemporary Music Award; BBC Audience Award Casadesus Competition; 1991 First Prize; Special Chopin Prize Gina Bachauer International Piano Competition; 1991 Third Prize; Best Performance of a Work of Mozart; Best Prokofiev Performance William Kapell Competition; 1990 Top Honors
- Website: http://www.ilyaitin.com

Ilya Itin (born 3 April 1967 in Yekaterinburg) is a Russian concert pianist residing in New York City.

== Early career ==
=== Music competition ===
Itin was the gold medalist of the 1996 Leeds International Piano Competition where he also captured the Contemporary Music Award and the BBC Audience Award.

In Russia, he was awarded the top prize given Moscow Conservatory in the Russian National Rachmaninov Competition, followed by top prizes at the William Kapell Competition. In 1991, he won First Prize, ' and the Special Chopin Prize at the Casadesus Competition (presently, the Cleveland International Piano Competition) and was awarded ', Best Prokofiev Performance, Best Performance of a Work of Mozart and Third Prize at the Gina Bachauer International Piano Competition, and Third Prize at the Arthur Rubinstein Competition, 1992.

== Current career ==
=== Performance ===
Ilya Itin has toured as a soloist throughout Europe, Asia, South America, and the United States. He has performed with numerous world class orchestras including the Cleveland Orchestra, the St. Petersburg Philharmonic, the Tokyo Symphony Orchestra, the Rochester Philharmonic, the Israel Camerata Jerusalem, the China National Symphony, the Bilkent Symphony of Ankara, the Symphony Orchestra of India, the Mexico City Philharmonic, and the London Philharmonic.

Itin has collaborated with prominent conductors throughout the world such as Sir Simon Rattle, Neeme Järvi, Christoph von Dohnanyi, Yakov Kreizberg, Vassily Sinaisky, Valery Polyansky, and Mikhail Pletnev.

Itin is a regular performer at the Miami International Piano Festival and the Golandsky Institute's International Piano Festival at Princeton University.

His recitals in the US and Asia have brought Itin critical acclaim.

In the summer of 2010, Itin returned from a five city tour of Asia, where he played his program of all 24 Rachmaninov Preludes to sold-out audiences. He opened the 2010–2011 season of the Rochester Philharmonic performing Liszt's Piano Concerto No. 1. His acclaimed concerto recordings include Beethoven's Concerto No. 2 with the Israel Camerata, and Haydn Concerto in D Major with the Arturo Benedetti Michaelangeli Festival Chamber Orchestra. Other recordings include: the newly released live recording of the 24 Rachmaninov Preludes, Prokofiev's Sixth Sonata, No. 7 and No. 8 and Mussorgsky's Pictures at an Exhibition, released by Video Artists International (VAI). His chamber music recordings, include DVDs of Beethoven's "Spring" sonata with Igor Gruppman, Brahms' Viola Sonata in F minor with Vesna Gruppman, and a recital with legendary violinist Ida Haendel at the Miami International Piano Festival.

=== Studies ===
Itin began his piano studies at age four, working throughout his childhood with Natalia Litvinova at the Sverdlovsk Music Conservatory for Gifted Children. Itin continued his studies with Lev Naumov at the Moscow Conservatory, graduating with the highest honors in 1990.

=== Recordings ===
On March 7, 2010, Itin recorded two live recitals at the Miami International Piano Festival's Master Pianists Series, which have recently been released on the VAI label. This "Russian piano music marathon" contains all 24 Rachmaninov Preludes and Prokofiev's Seventh and Eighth piano sonatas.

=== Teaching ===
Itin teaches as a guest instructor at the Juilliard School and Peabody Institute and is a visiting artist/professor at Musashino Academy of Music in Tokyo, Japan. He has worked in the Graduate Program at CUNY, New York, and teaches in the summer at the Golandsky Institute at Princeton University.
