= Rissa (artist) =

German artist

- Born: Karin Martin; 22 June 1938 (age 87); Rabenstein, Germany
- Occupation: Artist

Rissa (born Karin Martin on 22 June 1938 in Rabenstein near Chemnitz), is a German artist and former professor at the Kunstakademie Düsseldorf. In 1964 she adopted the artist name Rissa, derived from the Norwegian municipality, Rissa.

== Life ==
In 1953 Karin Martin emigrated to the Federal Republic of Germany with her parents from the German Democratic Republic. From 1960 to 1965 she studied at the Kunstakademie Düsseldorf under Karl Otto Götz, her classmates being HA Schult, Gerhard Richter, Sigmar Polke, Franz Erhard Walther and other to become significant German artists. In 1965 she married her professor. From 1969 to 2003, Rissa taught art at the Düsseldorf academy, first as a lecturer, then as a professor.

From the early 1960s and in the 70s, she worked closely with her professor and husband Götz. In 1972, they published a book entitled, Probleme der Bildästhetik – Eine Einführung in die Grundlagen des anschaulichen Denkens.

In 1977 she co-founded, with Astrid Feuser, Bernd Finkeldei, Udo Scheel and Norbert Tadeusz, the group Axiom. In 1997, she founded, with her husband, the K.O.Götz und Rissa-Stiftung.

== Work ==
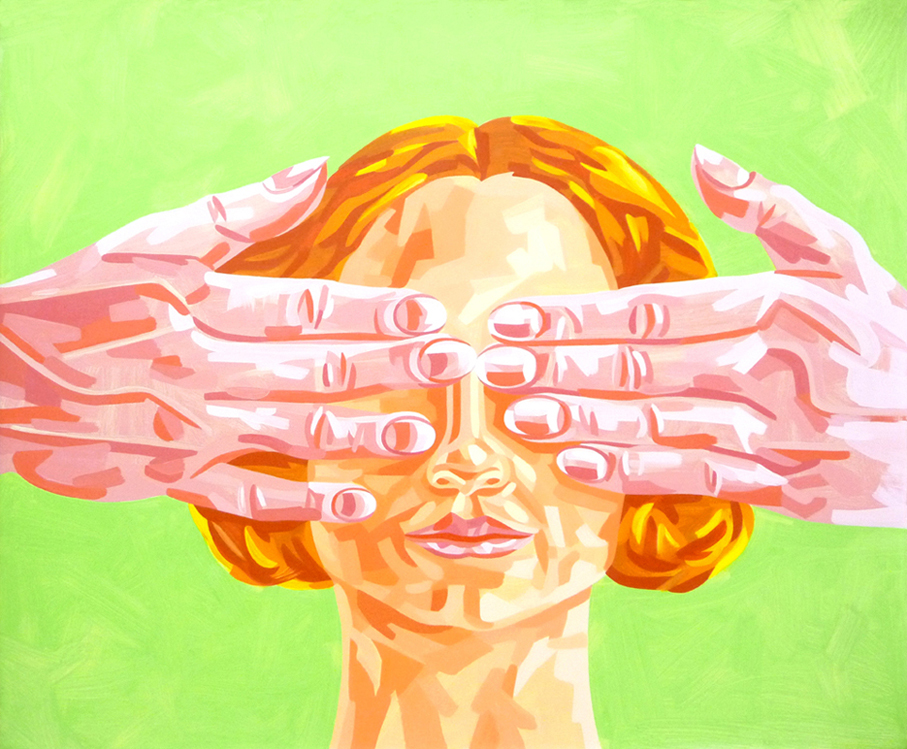
Rissa, Das Geheimnis, 1966

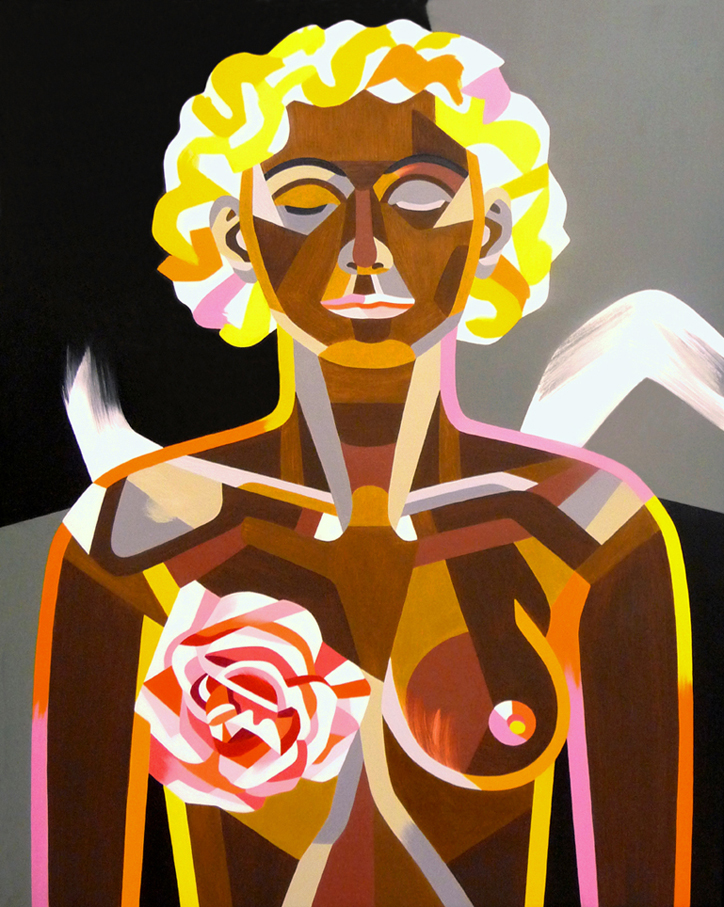
Rissa, Rosenengel, 1992

Rissa's representational painting is characterized by stylistic reduction and the emphasis on volume and form. From the mid-1960s, she developed a style that did not achieve volume through color transitions and light-dark gradations. Forms are divided into individual color areas, which are placed next to each other and only when viewed from a distance give a spatial effect as well as a higher degree of abstraction. References to Informalism are produced by brush strokes that break through individual color areas.

Rissa's themes are sexuality and eroticism, emancipation, environmental threats and the animal world. At the beginning of the 1990s her work also changed to topics such as the Gulf War and Islam. For example, the artist painted veiled Bedouin men and women ('Wüstensohn', 1991; 'Wüstentochter', 1993). The painting Am Golf (At the Gulf, 1991), shows a fish jumping out of the oil-laden, burning sea.

In addition to the paintings, ink drawings and gouaches have been published since the mid-1950s, for instance, to accompany poems by Karl Otto Götz.

== Exhibitions ==
- 1968: Rissa: Oliemalerier, Gouacher, Grafik, Henning Larsens Kunsthandel, Kopenhagen.
- 1972: Rissa: Gemälde 1964–1972. Handzeichnungen und Druckgraphik, de:Kunstverein für die Rheinlande und Westfalen, Düsseldorf.
- 1978: Rissa: Gemälde und Zeichnungen, Galerie Axiom, Cologne.
- 1980: Retrospektive Rissa, de:Märkisches Museum (Witten).
- 1985: Rissa: Neue Bilder 1980–1985, Museum am Ostwall, Dortmund.
- 1994: Rissa: Gemälde 1964–1994, de:Kunstsammlungen Chemnitz (Städtische Kunstsammlungen), Chemnitz].
- 1996: Rissa: Ölbilder 1970–1996, de:Villa Wessel, Iserlohn.
- 1999: Rissa: Bilder 1966–1998, de:Kunstmuseum Solingen (formerly Museum Baden), Solingen.
- 2004: Rissa: Gemälde und Zeichnungen, Museum Küppersmühle, Duisburg.
- 2009: K.O. Götz, Rissa: Gemälde, Röntgen-Museum Neuwied; Arbeiten auf Papier, Städtische Galerie Mennonitenkirche Neuwied.

== Select bibliography ==
- Rissa: Oliemalerier, Gouacher, Grafik, Henning Larsens Kunsthandel, Kopenhagen 1968.
- Rissa: Gemälde 1964–1972. Handzeichnungen und Druckgraphik, Düsseldorf 1972.
- Rissa: Gemälde und Zeichnungen, Galerie Axiom, Cologne, 1978.
- Rolf Jessewitsch, ed., Retrospektive Rissa, de:Märkisches Museum (Witten), 1980.
- Rissa: Neue Bilder 1980–1985, Museum am Ostwall, Dortmund 1985.
- Susanne Anna, ed., Rissa: Gemälde 1964–1994, de:Kunstsammlungen Chemnitz (Städtische Kunstsammlungen) (Chemnitz and Düsseldorf: Conzept Verlag, 1994), ISBN 3-921224-25-X.
- Wolfgang Zemter, ed., Rissa, Arbeiten auf Papier 1955–1998 (Bönen: DruckVerlag Kettler, 1998). ISBN 3-925608-55-9.
- Rolf Jessewitsch, ed., Rissa. Bilder 1966–1998, de:Kunstmuseum Solingen (Solingen-Gräfrath 1999).
- Walter Smerling, ed., Rissa. Gemälde und Zeichnungen, Museum Küppersmühle, Duisburg 2003.
- Petra Neuendorf and Bernd Willscheid, eds., K.O. Götz, Rissa: Gemälde, Röntgen-Museum Neuwied; Arbeiten auf Papier, Städtische Galerie Mennonitenkirche Neuwied, July 5 – September 13, 2009.
