= Anna Zlotovskaya =

Russian-Jewish-German violinist and performer

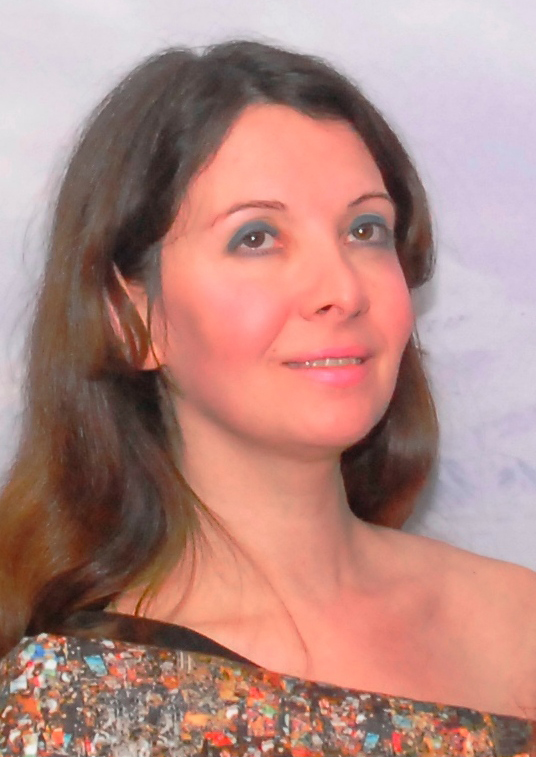
- Anna Zlotovskaya in 2017
- Born: June 13, 1967 (age 58); Moscow
- Spouse: HA Schult

Anna Zlotovskaya (russian Анна Злоцо́вская) née Smotritsch (russian Анна Смо́трич) is a Russian-Jewish-German violinist and performer.

== Life ==
HA Schult-Anna Zlotovskaya 2014, "HOME"

Born in (* June 13, 1967, in Moscow) into an Intelligentsia-family: father Bentsion Smotrich, an engineer-inventor and mother Olga Smotrich (née Fainstein), a cellist. Anna Zlotovskaya made her first appearance on the stage at the age of five as an actress of Moscow Art Theatre in Moscow. In the same age she began to study the violin with Natalya Boyarskaya at the Music School at the Academic Music College. Then she continued her studies at the Moscow Conservatory in 1986 to 1991 with the subsequent postgraduate concert examination in 1991–1993. 1994–97 she played as first violin at the Bolshoi Theatre, Moscow, under the direction of conductors Mstislav Rostropovich, Leonard Slatkin, Valery Gergiev, Dmitri Kitajenko, Pierre Boulez, Zubin Mehta. In 2001 she left Russia and went to Germany to realize her performances and directing work. Since 2010 she's been married to the German conceptual artist HA Schult, she co-organizes his projects around the world and appears as a part of his art works. They are living in Cologne and Düsseldorf.
