= Vladimir Landsman =

Soviet-Canadian violinist and teacher

Vladimir Landsman (born 21 December 1941 in Dushanbe) is a Soviet-Canadian violinist and teacher.

== Biography ==
Vladimir Landsman started to play violin at the age of five. At the age 12, on David Oistrakh's advice, he enrolled at the Moscow Central Music School where he studied under Yuri Yankelevich. He then studied for four years at the Merzlyakovsky College, before entering the Moscow Conservatory, where he earned an Aspirantura diploma.

In 1973 he immigrated to Israel, leaving shortly thereafter to Canada, and becoming a naturalized citizen in 1981.

== Music career ==
Landsman became a soloist with the Moscow Philharmonic Society, performing under the baton of well known conductors, amng them Gennady Rozhdestvensky and Evgeny Svetlanov.

In 1963 he won 3rd prize in Long-Thibaud Competition in Paris, and in 1966 he became a 1st prize winner at the Montreal International Music Competition.

Since 1975, Landsman has taught at the Music Faculty of the University of Montreal, where he is an associate professor.
