= Levon Ambartsumian =

Armenian classical violinist and conductor

Levon Ambartsumian (Russian: Лево́н Амбарцумя́н; Armenian: Լևոն Համբարձումյան; born 1955) is an Armenian classical violinist and conductor. Levon Ambartsumian currently lives and works in Athens, Georgia, United States.

Levon Ambartsumian studied in the Moscow Central Music School and then in the Moscow Tchaikovsky Conservatory, where his teachers were Mikhail Garlitsky, Felix Andrievski, Yuri Yankelevich, Leonid Kogan and Igor Bezrodny. In 1977 he became the First Prize winner of Zagreb International Violin Competition headed by Henryk Szeryng. Two years later he was a prizewinner of the Montreal International Competition, and in 1981 he won the USSR Violin Competition in Riga, Latvia.

Levon Ambartsumian was distinguished as Honored Artist of Armenia in 1988 and Honored Artist of Russia in 1997. Since 1977 Ambartsumian has performed regularly in all the main cities of the Soviet Union and Eastern Europe as he was not permitted to accept invitations to travel to the West. He has collaborated with conductors and composers such as Valery Gergiev, Vladimir Fedoseev, Maxim Shostakovich, Aram Khachaturian, Alfred Schnittke, and many others.

Since 1988 he performed in the USA, Canada, Italy, France, Germany, Greece, Spain, Brazil, and South Korea. In 1989, Ambartsumian founded the ARCO Chamber Orchestra, which started to regularly perform in Russia. Amabartsumian joined the faculty of the Moscow Tchaikovsky Conservatory in 1978 where he taught for 15 years. He was for two years a visiting professor at Indiana University School of Music. In 1995, Ambartsumian accepted the position of Franklin Professor of Violin at the University of Georgia School of Music.

Ambartsumian devotes himself to contemporary Russian, Armenian and American Music and has made several important world premiers. He has released several CDs, including music by Wieniawski, Sarasate, Brahms, Mendelssohn, Tchaikovsky, Vivaldi, Stravinsky, Bartók, Shostakovich, Schnittke, Bronner, Arutiunian and other contemporary composers. As a teacher, Ambartsumian has given master classes in Russia, Armenia, South Korea, Canada, Brazil, and France. His former students hold principal positions in major European orchestras in Germany, France, Portugal, and Denmark, and many have been prizewinners at international violin competitions.

== Discography ==
- Music of Sarasate and Wieniawski, with A. Sheludyakov, piano
- From Bach to Schnittke
- Music of Wieniawski
- Sonatas of Brahms, with E. Rivkin, piano
- Sonatas of Shostakovich, with A. Sheludyakov, piano
- Russian Violin Sonatas, with A. Sheludyakov, piano
- Music of Stravinsky and Bartók, with A. Sheludyakov, piano
- Vivaldi's Concerti, with A. Kniazev, cello, and ARCO Chamber Orchestra
- Mendelssohn's Concerti, with E. Rivkin, piano, and ARCO Chamber Orchestra
- Antonio Vivaldi, with ARCO Chamber Orchestra
- Music of Alfred Schnittke, with Moscow Tchaikovsky Symphony Orchestra
- Violin Concertos of Arutiunian, Vasks, Bronner, with ARCO Chamber Orchestra
- Violin Concertos of Bronner, Vasks, A. Tchaikovsky, with ARCO Chamber Orchestra
- Music of Lewis Nielson, with ARCO Chamber Orchestra
- Music of Shostakovich, with ARCO Chamber Orchestra
- Music of Tchaikovsky, with ARCO Chamber Orchestra
