= Karl Otto Götz =

German artist (1914–2017)

K.O. Götz
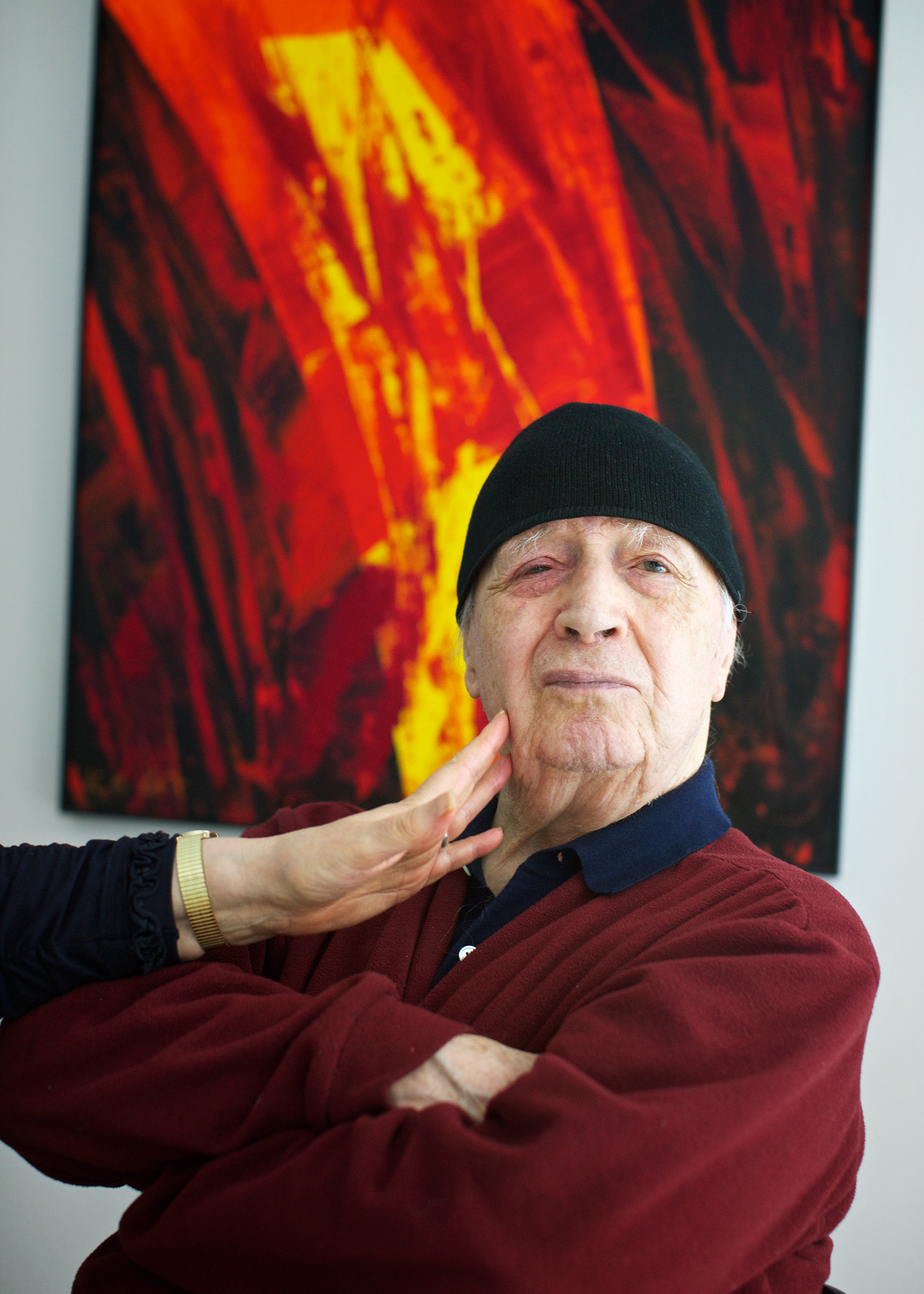
- Karl Otto Götz photographed by Oliver Mark in Götz's house in Niederbreitbach-Wolfenacker 2013
- Born: Karl Otto Götz; 22 February 1914; Aachen, Germany
- Died: 19 August 2017 (aged 103); Niederbreitbach, Germany
- Occupations: Artist, filmmaker, draughtsman/printmaker, writer, and art professor
- Website: www.xn--ko-gtz-zxa.de

Karl Otto Götz (22 February 1914 – 19 August 2017), often simply called K.O. Götz, was a German artist, filmmaker, draughtsman, printmaker, writer and professor of art at the Kunstakademie Düsseldorf. He was one of the oldest living and active artists older than 100 years of age and is best remembered for his explosive and complex abstract forms. His powerful, surrealist-inspired works earned him international recognition in exhibitions like documenta II in 1959. Götz never confined himself to one specific style or artistic field. He also explored generated abstract forms through television art. Götz is one of the most important members of the German Art Informel movement. His works and teachings influenced future artists such as Sigmar Polke, Nam June Paik and Gerhard Richter. He lived in Wolfenacker from 1975 until his death.

== Personal life ==
Born in Aachen, Germany, Götz began painting in secondary school in 1924. In 1930 he began painting abstracts. He attended the School of Applied Arts from 1932 to 1933. His early paintings were characterized by the modernist/avant-garde movements, surrealism and expressionism. Gӧtz was specifically influenced by artists such as Max Ernst, Juan Gris, Wassily Kandinsky and Paul Klee. After the takeover of Germany by the Nazi Party, painting became difficult for Gӧtz. He was banned from painting and exhibiting due to the national disapproval of abstract and surrealist art. However, he was able to make a living by creating and selling landscape paintings. Götz was drafted into the Wehrmacht Air Force and served his mandatory military service from 1936 to 1938. In World War II he became a signal officer in German-occupied Norway. Götz was able to continue to experiment with various media such as spray paint, photograms (created without the use of a camera by placing objects on photographic paper exposed then exposing it to light), and abstract cine-films. He moved to Dresden, Saxony and concentrated on abstract painting, combining geometric and organic elements. His early paintings were destroyed in the Bombing of Dresden in 1945. Gӧtz returned from Norway after the end of the war and married artist Anneliese Brauckmeyer (née Hager). Their marriage ended in 1965 and Götz remarried, to German artist Rissa, also known as Karin Martin.

== Career ==
=== Experimentation with Television Art ===
Television art can be defined as art made for or with broadcast television. Because of the medium’s electronic makeup, poor resolution, small scale images and various viewing conditions, television art began less related to avant-garde film and more closely related to abstract art. This medium was primarily worked with artists who focused on non-figurative representations in other media.

During the war, Gӧtz worked with many ground-based radars. He began to manipulate these radars electronically in order to create moving abstract forms. His goal of creating the large rastered pictures was to create ‘electron paintings’ imitating the form animated television pictures. Gӧtz’s work and theoretical ideas influenced artist like Nam June Paik, a Korean American artist who is considered the founder of video art. It is said that these experiments have led to Gӧtz making the decision to only create abstract works.

=== Early career ===
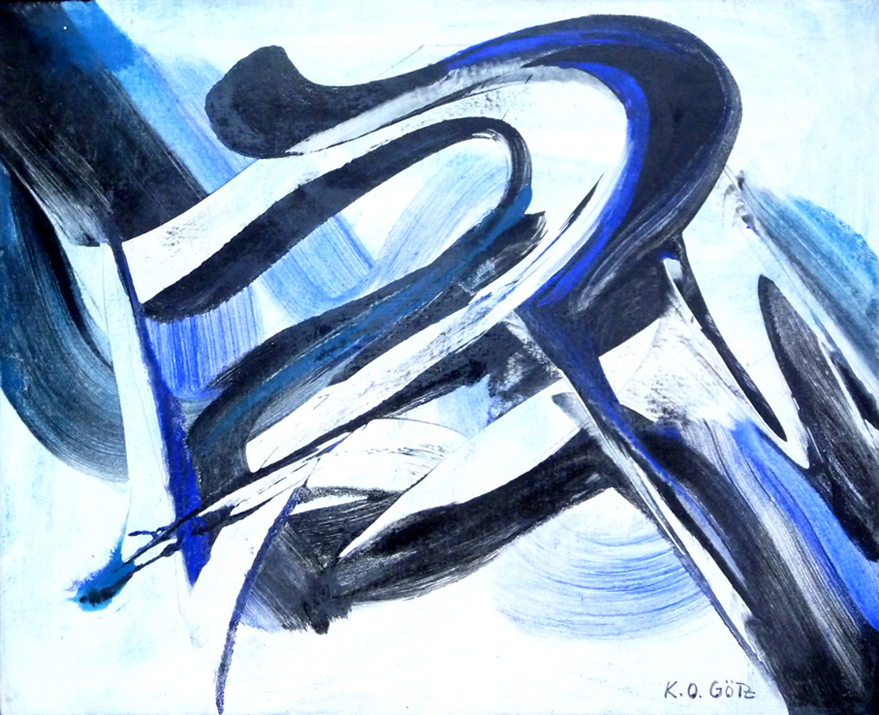
K. O. Götz, 27.5.1954, 1954

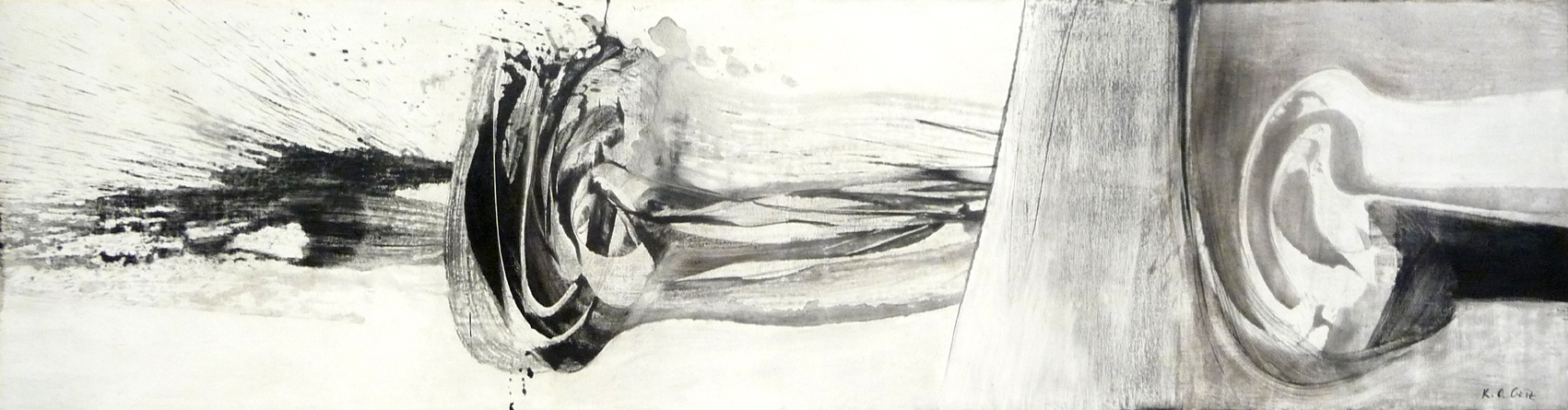
K. O. Götz, Bagatelle II, 1962

Götz's early post-War work included extensive experimentation with techniques and imagery in prints and drawings that included drawings made using an airpump. He produced woodcuts and watercolours that featured fantastical plant forms and creatures, among them a series of monotype prints of bird-humans. During the late 1940s he continued to producing abstract-figurative monotypes and surrealistic experimental photo works, but his painting became predominantly abstract.

In 1946 he began experimenting with solarization, a process similar to photograms. Gӧtz had his first one-man show in 1947. Two years later in 1949, Gӧtz completely moved away from figurative art altogether. That same year he became the first German to join the European avant-garde movement COBRA. COBRA was an avant-garde movement based in Europe and was active from 1948–51. This group, though together very briefly, put together a series of publications and exhibitions. The work of the COBRA group contributed to the emergence of Art Informel in the period after 1950 as a "universal language" for European artists involved in the development of European abstract expressionism and Tachisme.

In 1952, Gӧtz co-founded the Frankfurt QUADRIGA along with Otto Gries, Heinz Kreutz, and Bernard Schultze. The members in QUADRIGA were pioneers of Art Informel in Germany. These were a group of artists painting in a Tachist style influenced by Wols and Automatism. During the group's brief existence, before the divergence of its loosely associated members' artistic development led to its dissolution in 1954, Quadriga played an important pioneer role in introducing Art informel to Germany From then on, he became a leading figure in the German Art Informal and was showcased in major shows such as the Venice Biennale of 1958 and Documenta II exhibition in Kassel in 1959. That year, he was appointed professor of art at the Kunstakademie Düsseldorf.

As Götz moved away from clearly defined forms, his approach to painting became more dynamic. In a technique Götz has continued to use throughout his later painting career, the image is developed through a lengthy, intense process, often involving a large number of preliminary sketches and gouaches. Once the preparation is complete, the artist applies dark paint onto a light background with a paintbrush, working in a fast and focused way. The paint is then "raked" - partially removed using a type of spatula known as a "rake" - before the contrast between the light and dark areas of the still-moist surface is softened using a dry paintbrush.

=== Later career ===
Starting in 1971, Götz began conducting experiments at the Düsseldorf Academy on visual perception and personality. His research is recognized by international psychologists. From 1995 to 2001, Götz began to create ceramic pieces. Some of these ceramic works, such as his plates and vases, are decorated with his unique gestural and bold brushstrokes. In other instances, these brushstrokes take on three dimensional forms. Several of his low relief sculptures reflect the same fluid and dynamic movement that can be found in his unique painting technique.

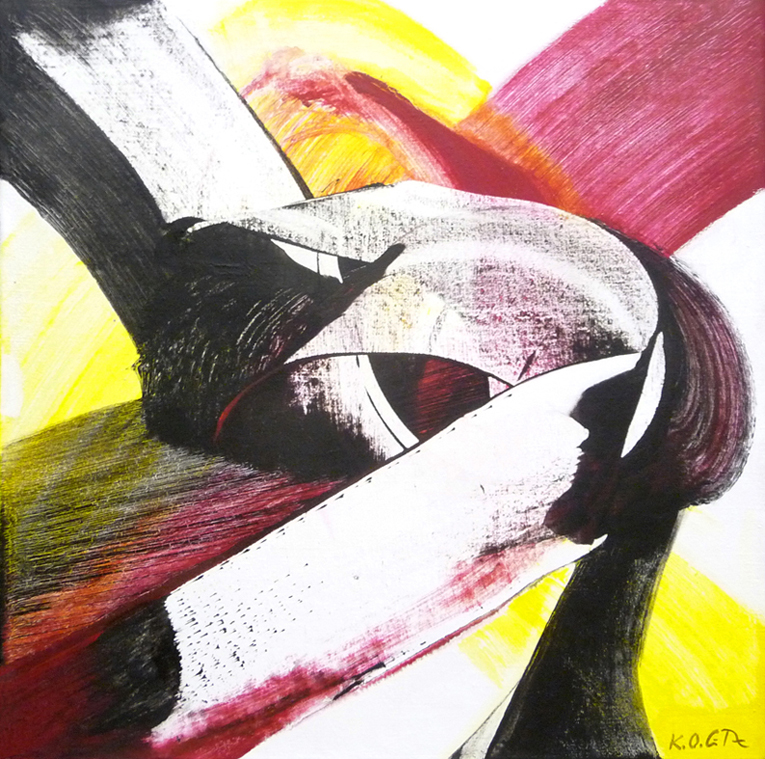
K. O. Götz, Lezuk III, 2012

Götz's contemporary work (2010) features deeply colored abstract collages and hand-painted pieces based on a computer-generated random pixelation process. In 1997 the KO Götz and Rissa Foundation was founded. Its purpose is to promote art and culture by making the works of KO Götz and Rissa’s work more available to the public. This will be accomplished by presentations of the works by both artists in museums and other art associations.

In the summer of 2013, photographer Oliver Mark spent several days with Götz at his home and studio in Niederbreitbach-Wolfenacker. Mark explored the artist's archive and selected poems and text fragments. This resulted in the artist's book Aus den Trümmern kriecht das Leben ("Life Curls From the Ruins"), published by b.frank books, which pairs 20 intimate portraits with seven facsimile poems by Götz. The title poem reflects Götz's experiences during the Allied bombing of Dresden in February 1945. To accompany his 100th-birthday retrospective, 18 of these photographs were shown in a solo exhibition by Oliver Mark at the Kunstsammlungen Chemnitz, which holds an extensive collection of Götz's works on paper.

Götz turned 100 in February 2014. He died on 19 August 2017 at the age of 103.

== Influence ==
Apart from his artistic work, Götz was also successful as a teacher of art. From 1959-79, during his time as a professor at the Kunstakademie Düsseldorf, a large number of later famous artists were his students. For instance, in 1959, Götz's first students were Gotthard Graubner, HA Schult and Kuno Gonschior. From 1961 on, Gerhard Richter and Sigmar Polke also studied under Götz. Furthermore, Rissa (Götz's later wife), and Franz Erhard Walther were also among his students.

=== Recent exhibitions ===
- Berlin, Neue Nationalgalerie, "KO Götz, A Retrospective on the 100th Birthday", Traveling exhibition, together with the Küppersmühle, Duisburg, and the Museum Wiesbaden
- Duisburg, Küppersmühle, "KO Götz, A Retrospective on the 100th Birthday", traveling exhibition, together with the Neue Nationalgalerie, Berlin, and the Museum Wiesbaden
- Wiesbaden, "KO Götz, A Retrospective on the 100th Birthday", traveling exhibition, together with the Neue Nationalgalerie, Berlin, and the Küppersmühle, Duisburg
- Berlin, Art Wolfgang Werner, "Karl Otto Götz: Works 1947-2012", Kronberg im Taunus, gallery Uwe Oppermann, "Karl Otto Götz: Lithographs 1983-2004"
- Aachen, Suermondt Ludwig Museum, "Karl Otto Götz, painting and Byways, An exhibition on the 100th Birthday", Wismar, St George's Church, "KO Götz: Lithography"
- Munich, gallery Maulberger, "Karl Otto Götz and the Quadriga A legend is 100"
- Saarbrücken, gallery Elitzer, KO Götz 100th - Graphics from its own holdings
- Chemnitz Art Collections, "KO Götz 100th birthday - Paintings and artwork in its own inventory"
- Aachen, Gallery at Elisengarten, "KO Götz - 100th Birthday", Kaiserslautern, Volksbank Kaiserslautern-Nordwestpfalz, "Karl Otto Götz's 100th birthday - works on paper from seven decades"
- Aachen, Schürenberg - KUNSTHANDEL, "KO Götz - Retrospective", Düsseldorf, Museum Kunst Palast, "KO Götz 100th birthday pictures from the Foundation collection Kemp"
- Koblenz, Rhine Gorge Museum, "KO Götz - Special Presentation at his 100th birthday"
- Hilden, Cultural Affairs Art Space Business Park South, "100 Years of Karl Otto Götz - the graphic work"
- Dresden, Gallery ART EXHIBITION IN A COOL, "KO Götz's 100th birthday, surreal working group of the '40s"
- Solingen, construction sites gallery, "KO Götz and his friends" (with Müller-Kraus, Master Man, Dahmen)
- Königswinter, Siebengebirgsmuseum, "KO Götz - Retrospective .. at 100 - works from the Hennemann collection"
- Beaulieu/France, Association culturelle ABBAY DE BEAULIEU - Centre d'Art, "traits ... très noirs - Homage to Karl Otto Götz"
- Ehingen/Donau, castle Mochental, Galerie Ewald Karl Schrade, Karlsruhe/Mochental, together with Bernard Schultze, "Karl Otto Götz. Bernard Schultze - Works on Paper 1949-2003", King Winter, studio monkey, "Karl Otto Götz". Lithographs, Frankfurt, THE GALLERY, "Karl Otto Götz", Sindelfingen, City Gallery of Sindelfingen, "KO Götz - painters, poets and scientists"
- Kleve, Museum Kurhaus Kleve, Götz room on the occasion of the 100th birthday of Koblenz, Galerie Eva Tent

== See also ==
- List of German painters
