= Boris Belkin =

Russian violinist (born 1948)

Boris Belkin Борис Белкин
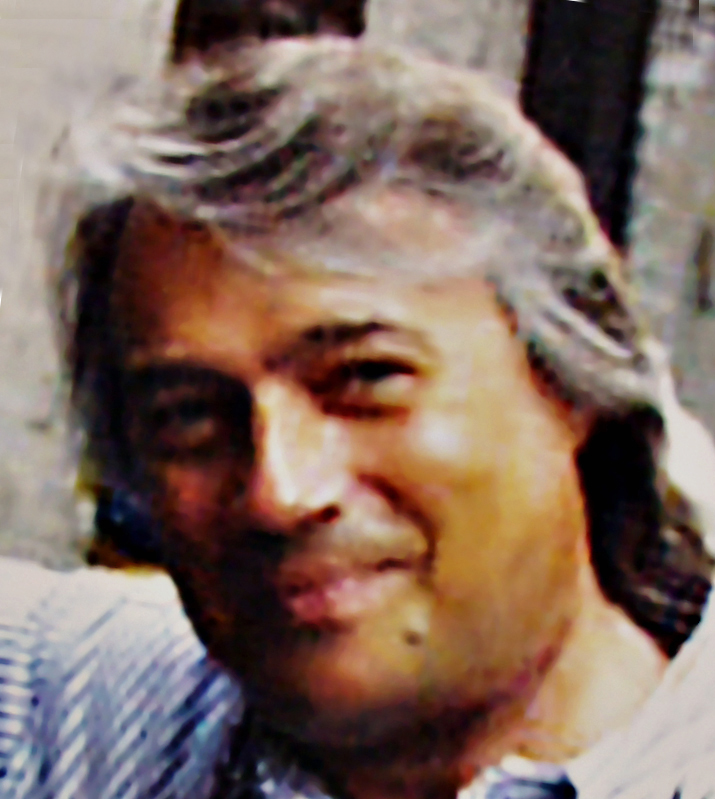
- Boris Belkin

Background information
- Born: 26 January 1948 (age 78); Sverdlovsk, Soviet Russia, USSR
- Genre: Classical
- Occupation: Violinist
- Instrument: Violin

Boris Davidovich Belkin (Russian: Борис Давидович Белкин; born 26 January 1948) is a Soviet-born violin virtuoso.

== Teachers ==
He was taught by Yuri Yankelevich and Isaac Stern.

== Early years ==
As a child prodigy he began studying the violin at the age of six, and made his first public appearance with Kirill Kondrašin when he was seven. He studied at the Central Music School at the Moscow Conservatory with Professors Yuri Yankelevich Felix Andrievsky and Isaac Stern. While still a student he played all over the Soviet Union with leading national orchestras, and in 1973 won first prize at the Soviet National competition for Violinists. However, he was not granted a visa to participate in the 1971 nor 1973 Paganini Competitions in Italy, and he decided to emigrate to Israel in 1974. He moved on to London, Paris and back to London. He met his Belgian wife at a Yehudi Menuhin festival in Switzerland and settled in Liège. By 1990 he had become a Belgian citizen.

== Career ==
In 1974 he emigrated to the west and since then has performed all over the world with many of the leading orchestras including the Boston Symphony, Cleveland Orchestra, Berlin Philharmonic, Israel Philharmonic, Barcelona Symphony Orchestra, Sofia Philharmonic Orchestra, Los Angeles Philharmonic, Philadelphia Orchestra, Pittsburgh Symphony, Montreal Symphony, Bavarian Radio Symphony Orchestra, Royal Concertgebouw Orchestra, Royal Liverpool Philharmonic Orchestra, and all major British Orchestras.

Boris Belkin has been featured in many television productions: a film biography of Jean Sibelius, performing the Sibelius Concerto with the Swedish Radio Orchestra and Ashkenazy, with Bernstein and the New York Philharmonic, performing the Tchaikovsky Concerto, with Bernstein and the Orchestre National de France playing Ravel's Tzigane, and with Haitink and the Royal Concertgebouw Orchestra playing Mozart and Paganini violin concerto No.1.

Conductors with whom he has collaborated, include Bernstein, Ashkenazy, Mehta, Maazel, Muti, Ozawa, Sanderling, Rudolf Barshai, Temirkanov, Dohnányi, Dutoit, Gelmetti, Herbig, Tennstedt, Rattle, Haitink, Berglund, Mata, Chung, Hirokami, Fedoseyev, Ahronovich, Groves, Leinsdorf, Steinberg, Welser-Möst, Lazarev, Doron Salomon, Simonov and many others. In 1997 Isaac Stern invited Mr. Belkin to perform with him at the Miyazaki Festival.

Boris Belkin also dedicates himself to chamber music, performing with artists such as Yuri Bashmet, Mischa Maisky and many others.

Highlights of the 2007–2008 season include a tour with St. Petersburg Philharmonic and conductor Temirkanov, a tour in South America, concerts with the NHK Symphony Orchestra in Tokyo and performing the Sibelius Concerto with Sydney Symphony and Ashkenazy, concerts in London, Berlin, Barcelona, Rome.

Since 1987 Boris Belkin has held master classes at the Accademia Musicale Chigiana in Siena, Italy, and since 1997 he is a faculty member at the Maastricht Academy of Music in the Netherlands. Janine Jansen was one of his students.

== Discography ==
- Paganini Violin Concerto No. 1 with the Israel Philharmonic and Zubin Mehta
- Tchaikovsky and Sibelius Violin Concertos with the Philharmonia Orchestra and Ashkenazy, Strauss Violin Concerto with Berlin Radio Symphony Orchestra and Ashkenazy
- Prokofiev Violin Concertos No. 1 and No. 2 with the London Symphony Orchestra and Kondrashin
- Brahms Concerto with the London Symphony Orchestra and Ivan Fischer
- Prokofiev Violin Concertos with the Zurich Tonhalle and Michael Stern
- Shostakovich Violin Concerto No. 1 and the Glazunov Violin Concerto with the Royal Philharmonic Orchestra and Junichi Hirokami
- Tchaikovsky Violin Concerto with the London Philharmonic and Michael Stern
- Mozart Violin Concerto No. 5 and Sinfonia Concertante, K.364 with the Salzburg Chamber Soloists
- Brahms Violin Sonatas with Michel Dalberto.
