= Gotthard Graubner =

German painter (1930–2013)

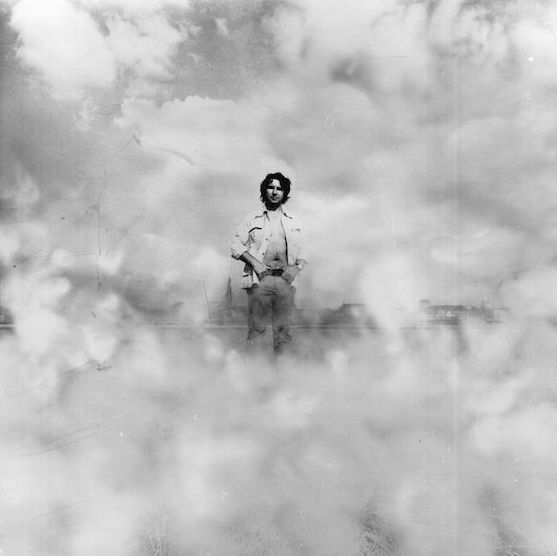
- Born: 13 June 1930; Erlbach, Germany
- Died: 24 May 2013 (aged 82); Neuss, Germany
- Known for: Painter

Gotthard Graubner (13 June 1930 – 24 May 2013) was a German painter, born in Erlbach, in Saxony, Germany.

Graubner studied at the Academy of Arts, Berlin, the Dresden Academy of Fine Arts and the Düsseldorf Academy of Arts in Germany, before becoming a professor at the Academy of Fine Arts in Hamburg in 1969 and at the Kunstakademie Düsseldorf in 1976. His work Black Skin (Schwarze Haut), was selected to be featured in one of the 100 Great Paintings programmes by the BBC in 1980. For the last decades of his life, he lived and worked in Düsseldorf and on the Museum Insel Hombroich, Neuss, where he died shortly before his 83rd birthday.

== Life ==
Graubner was born in 1930 in Erlbach (Saxony, Germany). From 1947 to 1948 he studied at the Academy of Arts, Berlin, and from 1948 to 1949 at the Academy of Arts, Dresden, where he was a student of Wilhelm Rudolph. When his professor had to leave the Dresden academy for ideological reasons, Graubner was on his side and therefore exmatriculated. In 1954 he left East Germany.

From 1954 to 1959, Graubner studied painting at the Kunstakademie Düsseldorf, where he was first a student of Otto Pankok with Günther Uecker and Bert Gerresheim becoming his classmates. Later he became a master pupil of Georg Meistermann. In 1959, when Meistermann left the Academy, Graubner became one of Karl Otto Götz's first students, his classmates being HA Schult, who also studied under Meistermann, and Kuno Gonschior.

In 1959, Graubner left the academy. Shortly before leaving it, he came into contact with Otto Piene and Heinz Mack, the founders of the Zero group, For some years, Graubner worked, with Mack, as an art teacher at the Lessing Gymnasium, Düsseldorf.

In 1965 he was appointed at the Academy of Fine Arts, Hamburg, where he became Professor of Painting in 1969. From 1976 to 1992 he hold a professorship at the Academy of Fine Arts, Düsseldorf. Among his many Düsseldorf students were Chen Ruo Bing, Mechthild Hagemann, Doris Helbling, Jana Vizjak, Hans-Willi Notthoff, Georg Schmidt, Jens Stittgen, Stoya, Martin Streit, Peter Thol, Ulrich Moskopp, Albert Maria Pümpel, Ingo Ronkholz, Ansgar Skibba and Carl Emanuel Wolff

In 1988 the Federal President of Germany ordered two works from Graubner. The artist was also commissioned to create a cushion picture for the German Bundestag. In 1996 he became a member of the Saxon Academy of Arts, Dresden.

After his retirement, Graubner lived and worked in Düsseldorf-Oberkassel, where he had his studio. His last years he spent on the island of the Museum Insel Hombroich, Neuss, near Düsseldorf.

== Artistic style: colored cushions and color-space bodies ==
Graubner's art is characterised by his unique philosophy and the use of color in his work. He began developing his own style in 1959, while he studied under K.O. Götz. Before that, Graubner's work had been characterised by using color sparingly, in shapes and on the edges of the canvas, but, from 1955 onwards, he had already experimented with different approaches towards color, at first with watercolor and later on canvas. Instead of focusing on shapes, he began to use color lavishly.

About 1960, the artist produced flat panel paintings with surfaces built up of differentiated nebulous color formations, the application of color in layers of varying degrees of transparency opening up the picture surface, producing a color formation of indefinite depth comparable to the paintings of Mark Rothko.

In the 1960s, Graubner mounted picture-size colored cushions onto his paintings and used Perlon fabric in an attempt to enhance the spatial effect of color surfaces. These works were displayed in Alfred Schmela's gallery in Düsseldorf.

Between 1968 and 1972 he did what he called "Nebelräume" ["Fog Spaces"].

Graubner never allowed his style to be dictated by the current fashions or trends. He developed his own style of using color as the medium through which his work announced itself, allowing it to work independently of any connection to any kind of representation or theme. According to Helga Meister, his works have sensibility, feeling and meditative force. However, his paintings are only at first glance monochrome; as a closer look reveals, they are in fact polychrome. They "breathe"; they live; their colors, even though fixed on canvas, have movement that stirs the imagination as much as his "fog-spaces" of the sixties, in which he continued the romantic tradition of Caspar David Friedrich. Moreover, his "color-space bodies" ("Farbraumkörper") have been described by art historian Max Imdahl as "picture-objects" in which "color-space and body, intangible vision and tangible facticity cooperate in a special interrelationship."

Graubner explains the genesis of his painting as an "intermediate" between Caspar David Friedrich and J. M. W. Turner. According to art historian Werner Hofmann (who had Friedrich's The Monk by the Sea in mind), both Graubner and Friedrich created an aesthetics of monotony as a counterpart to the aesthetics of variety that was predominant before the nineteenth century. Graubner also saw his own work in the tradition of old masters such as Matthias Grünewald, Titian, El Greco and Paul Cézanne.

Berke Inel considers Graubner's "original use of the color-light-space triad" as the "unique aspect" of his work: "The artist presents color to the audience as though it were a landscape," and he always pays attention to detail. "While he does not use specific shapes, he uses color shades and the warm-cold balances and contrasts very well." His artworks have "no specific topic and theory" and represent "a research into color and a 'tone in tone' approach."

== Exhibitions ==
In 1975, there was a major Graubner exhibition at the Kunsthalle Hamburg. In 1977, the Städtische Kunsthalle Düsseldorf presented the exhibition, "Gotthard Graubner: Farbräume, Farbkörper, Arbeiten auf Papier". In 1980, his works were shown at the Kunsthalle Tübingen and the Staatliche Kunsthalle Baden-Baden. In the 1980s, Graubner's paintings were presented in exhibitions at the Royal Academy of Art, London, entitled "A New Spirit in Painting" (1981) and "German Art in the Twentieth Century: Painting and Sculpture 1905–1985". In 1982, Graubner participated in the Venice Biennale. In 1987, the Kunstsammlung NRW, Düsseldorf, presented his paintings of the mid-80s. In 1990, the Kunsthalle Bremen exhibited his works on paper. In 1992, he exhibited together with Gerhard Richter and Sigmar Polke at the Galerie Schönewald and Beuse, Krefeld. In 1995, his paintings were shown at the Saarland Museum, Saarbrücken. In 2000, Graubner's drawings were presented at the Staatliche Kunstsammlungen Dresden and his other works at the Goethe-Institut, Istanbul, the CaixaForum Barcelona and the Ankara State Art and Sculpture Museum. In 2001, the Staatliche Kunsthalle Karlsruhe exhibited his watercolors. In 2002, his work was shown in a major exhibition at the Wiesbaden Museum. In 2005, the Art Museum of the China Academy of Art, Hangzhou, and the Art Museum of the China Central Academy of Fine Arts, Beijing, presented his paintings and watercolors.

== Notable works ==
Graubner's works include Kissenbilder (Cushion Pictures; ca. 1960s), Erster Nebelraum – Hommage à Caspar David Friedrich (1968) and further Fog Spaces ("Nebelräume", 1969–1971, 2006–2007). In 1988, Graubner was commissioned to create two large cushion pictures for the Schloss Bellevue in Berlin.

== Awards ==
Gotthard Graubner was awarded the August Macke Prize of the city of Meschede in 1987 and the North German Art Prize in 1988. In 2001, he was awarded the Otto Ritschl Prize that honours a life's work in colour painting.

== See also ==
- List of German painters
