= Kuno Gonschior =

German painter (1933–2010)

- Born: 10 September 1933; Wanne-Eickel, Nazi Germany
- Died: 16 March 2010 (aged 76); Bochum, Germany
- Occupation: Printer

Kuno Gonschior (10 September 1933 in Wanne-Eickel – 16 March 2010 in Bochum) was a German painter.

From 1957 to 1961, Gonschior studied painting at the Kunstakademie Düsseldorf. In 1959, he was one of the first students of Karl Otto Götz, his classmates being Gotthard Graubner and HA Schult. From 1961 to 1963 he studied at the University of Cologne. In 1972, he became lecturer at the Pädagogische Hochschule Münster. From 1982 to 2000, he was a professor of painting at the Hochschule für Bildende Künste Berlin.

Gonschior's early work with its intuitive, almost monochrome strokes of the brush was influenced by Götz's abstract style. Later, during the 1960s, he created paintings out of characteristic dots placed next to each other, combining fluorescent, complementary colors such as red and green. As a result, extreme vibrations are triggered in the human eye. He also painted large, abstract landscapes merging and melting thick paint in rich colors. Furthermore, he was inspired by the color theories of Josef Albers. From 1968, he created colored multi-room installations.

In 1977, the artist participated in the documenta 6 in Kassel. After that date, he primarily exhibited in the US and in Japan. In 1999, he received the Deutscher Kritikerpreis.
