= Roman Moiseyev =

Russian conductor

Roman Yurevich Moiseyev
- Роман Юрьевич Моисеев
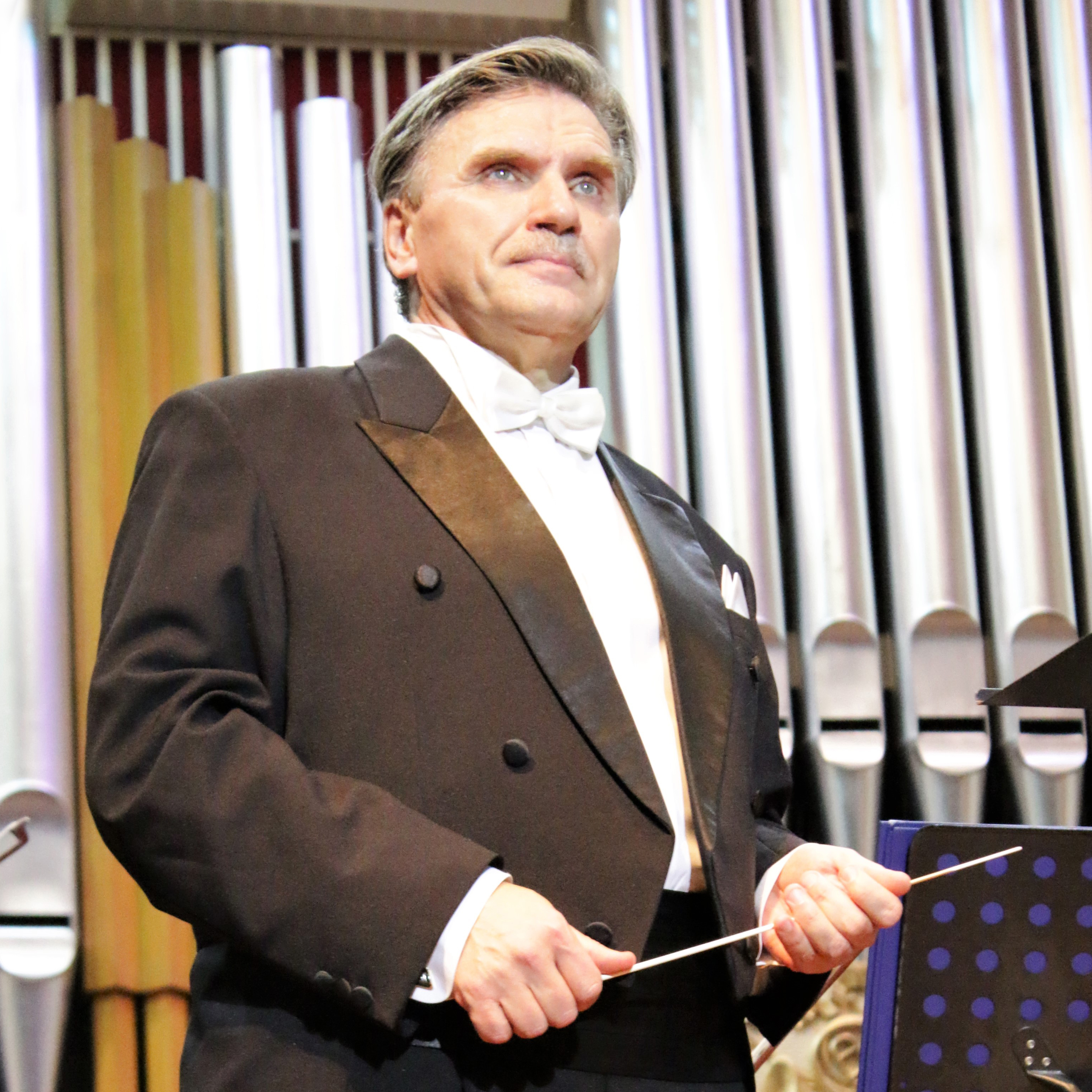
- Born: May 12, 1960 (age 66); Moscow
- Education: Academic Music College, Gnessins Russian Academy of Music, Moscow Conservatory
- Occupation: Conductor

Roman Yurevich Moiseyev (Russian: Роман Юрьевич Моисеев) (born 12 May 1960 in Moscow) is a Russian conductor.

== Biography ==
Moiseyev received a musical education at the Academic Music College (1975-1979) and the Gnessins Russian Academy of Music (1985–1992). He is a graduate of the P.I.Tchaikovsky Moscow State Conservatory, where he studied with Gennady Rozhdestvensky (1993–94) and Dmitry Kitayenko (1994–98).

== Choral conductor ==
Moiseyev's career as a conductor started in 1979 on the board of the Moscow Music-Choral Society. In 1981 he organized the Moscow Chamber Choir at the Maxim Gorky Palace of Culture, where he served for ten years as art director and conductor. In 1992–1995 he was the music director and chief conductor of the Philharmonic Cappella of Moscow.

== Operatic and symphonic conductor ==
In 1995 Moiseyev conducted the symphonic orchestra of the Adygea Republic. In 1996-1997 he became the head of the Youth Symphonic Orchestra at the Gnessins Russian Academy of Music. Since 1999 he has been the musical director of the Buryat National Opera House in Ulan-Ude, where he staged several of performances including The Queen of Spades by P.I. Tchaikovsky and Die Fledermaus by J. Strauss II. Since 2006 he has been conductor of the Moscow Symphonic Orchestra.

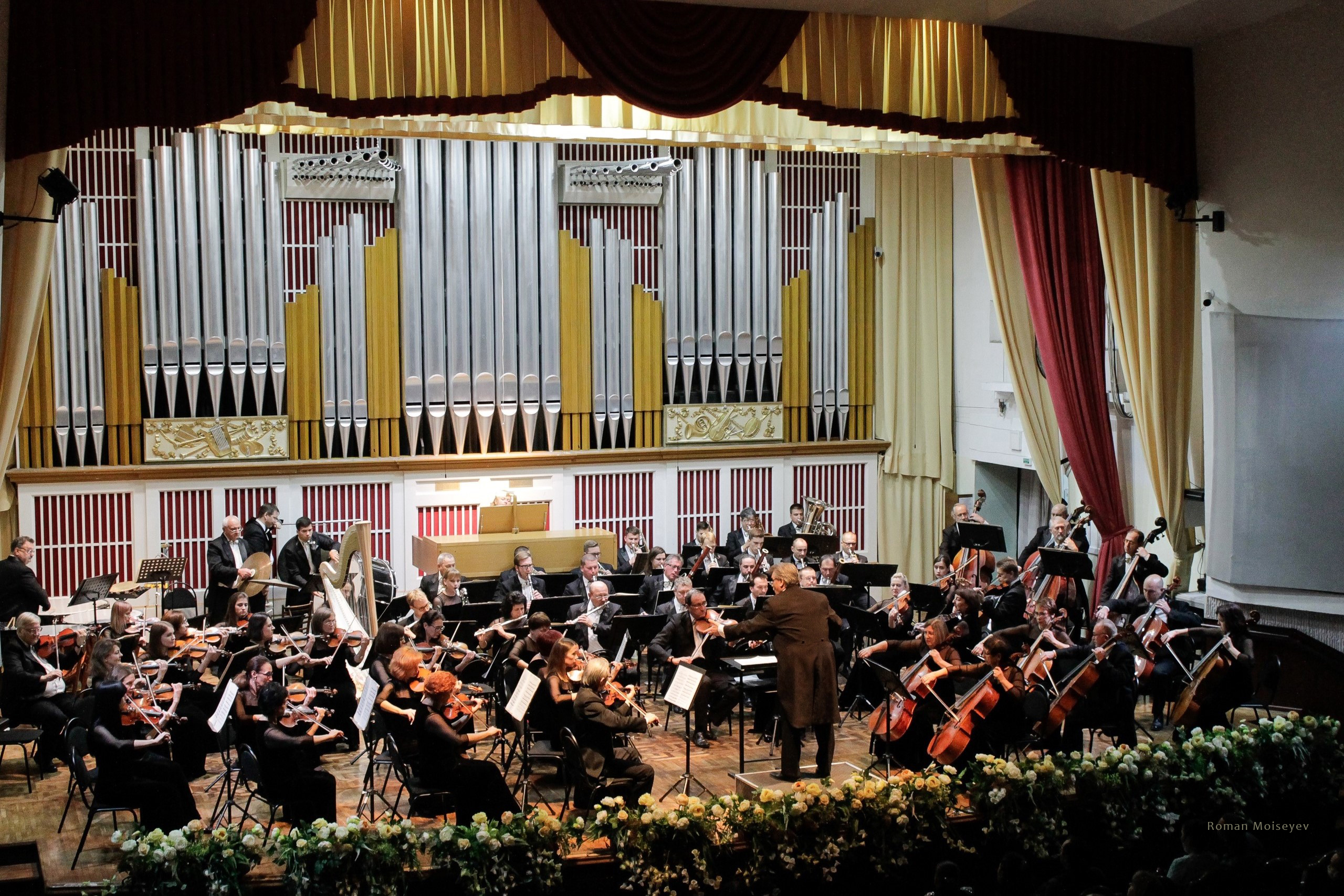
P. Tchaikovsky. Manfred Symphony

Roman Moiseyev collaborates with soloists, symphony orchestras and opera houses in several countries.
