= Dmitri Berlinsky =

Russian musician

- Дмитрий Берлинский
- Born: 1969 (age 56–57); Saint Petersburg
- Education: Moscow Conservatory, Juilliard School of Music
- Occupations: Solo violinist, chamber musician, teacher

Dmitri Romanovich Berlinsky (Russian: Дмитрий Романович Берлинский; born 1969) is an international solo violinist, chamber musician and a teacher. He took first prize in the Paganini Competition (Italy), and was the winner of the Montreal International Violin Competition, the International Tchaikovsky Competition, and the Queen Elisabeth Music Competition in Brussels. Berlinsky has performed with major orchestras in Europe, Russia, Asia, and North and South America.

He has presented recitals and concerts in more than 40 U.S. states, in addition to Australia, Mexico, Korea, the Czech Republic, Uruguay, Belgium, France, Russia, Canada, Japan, Taiwan, Guatemala, Peru, and Italy.

He has performed at Mostly Mozart, Prague Spring, Aspen Music, and Newport Music festivals. He has also performed in the Settimane Musicale (Italy), and has toured South America with the Prague Chamber Orchestra. Berlinsky has made recordings for Melodiya (Russia), the Canadian Broadcasting Corporation, and Helicon Records.

Originally from Saint Petersburg, Russia, Berlinsky received a bachelor of music and master of music from the Moscow Conservatory, and a performer's certificate from the Juilliard School of Music. He studied with Victor Tretiakov, E. Chugaeva, N. Latinsky, Dorothy DeLay, Masao Kawasaki, L. Ivaschenko, B. Sergeev, B. Gutnikov, and Mikhail Bezverkhny.

Berlinsky taught at Chautauqua and Summit Music Festivals in New York, International Academy of Music in Italy, and Shuan Yin Festival in Taiwan. He gave master classes at the University of South Carolina, Temple University, and Roosevelt University.

Many of his former students have won important international competitions such as the Tchaikovsky, Menuhin, and Tibor Varga, and have assumed positions in orchestras including the Boston Symphony Orchestra.
