= Nelli Shkolnikova =

Soviet violinist (1928–2010)

Nelli Efimovna Shkolnikova (Russian: Нелли Ефимовна Школьникова; 8 July 1928 – 2 February 2010) was a Soviet violinist who spent many years teaching in Australia and the United States.

She was born in Zolotonosha, Ukrainian SSR. At the age of three, she moved with her family to Moscow, and soon displayed aptitude for the violin. At the age of five she entered the Moscow Conservatory, where she studied with Lillia Kossodo and Yuri Yankelevich. She played her first concerto at age eight. She won the 1953 Marguerite Long-Jacques Thibaud Competition in Paris when she was 25. She then embarked on an international performing career, as well as teaching. She appeared in concert in the then Soviet Union, Europe, USA, Canada, Japan, Australia, and New Zealand. She became a faculty member at the Gnessin Institute of Music in Moscow.

Between 1970 and 1982, she was barred from leaving the Soviet Union. When she was finally allowed to leave, she defected to the West in Berlin on 26 November 1982. She settled in Melbourne, Australia, where she taught at the Victorian College of the Arts (VCA), an offer made to her after meeting the conductor John Hopkins in Germany. She became the Victorian Arts Centre’s first Artist-in-Residence. In 1987, on the recommendation of Isaac Stern, she was invited to join the faculty of Indiana University's Jacobs School of Music as professor of violin. She later returned to her post at the VCA in Melbourne.

She produced a great number of recordings in the Soviet Union, although few of them have been available outside Russia. She attracted praise for her recordings of the Tchaikovsky and Mendelssohn violin concertos (1959, 1973; under Kirill Kondrashin and Gennady Rozhdestvensky respectively), and some shorter pieces by Khachaturian, Paganini and Ysaÿe (recorded 26 June 1953, shortly after winning the Long-Thibaud Competition).

Nelli Shkolnikova died in Melbourne, following a long battle with cancer, on 2 February 2010.

== Sources ==
- Indiana University
- University of Melbourne: News
