= Chen Ruo Bing =

Chinese artist

Chen Ruo Bing (born 1970) is a Chinese artist whose abstract color painting merges Eastern tradition and Western contemporary art.

== Life and work ==
Born into a family of scholars and artists, Chen Ruo Bing grew up during the Chinese Cultural Revolution. He was interested in Chinese ink wash painting, calligraphy, philosophy, and poetry. From 1988 to 1991 he was a student at the Academy of Fine Arts in Hangzhou. Focusing on black and white landscape painting, he explored the categories of space and time, especially the static time in Chinese art, but also the dynamic time in the Western world.

Because of his great interest in Western philosophy and art theory he went to Germany. From 1992 to 1998 he studied painting at the Kunstakademie Düsseldorf, where he was a student of Gotthard Graubner. His professor continued teaching him "black and white" painting until he found the color for himself. In addition to the theories of Kazimir Malevich and Wassily Kandinsky, the symbiotic aesthetics of his art has been influenced by the painting of Josef Albers, Ad Reinhardt, Mark Rothko and Barnett Newman.

According to The New York Times critic Ken Johnson, "the quiet abstract paintings by Chen Ruo Bing at Taguchi provide a contemplative respite. Working on medium-size canvases, he creates simple compositions: grids of gray boxes centered on monolithic forms and, in one case, a square delineated by four purple brush strokes on a yellow field. The main interest lies in the rich colors stained into the canvas, which glow with Rothko-esque incandescence. The work is a fine blend of formalism, hedonism and transcendentalism."

The artist periodically exhibits at galleries and museums in Germany, the Netherlands, China, South Korea and Japan, and his works are presented at art fairs in Germany, the Netherlands, China, South Korea, Japan, the United States, England and Australia. In 2000, he received the Advancement Award of the Hedwig and Robert Samuel Foundation, Düsseldorf. In 2006, he was part of the Artist in Residence Program of the Josef and Anni Albers Foundation, Bethany, Connecticut.

He lives and works in Düsseldorf.
