= Mikhail Bezverkhny =

Russian musician

- Михаил Безверхний
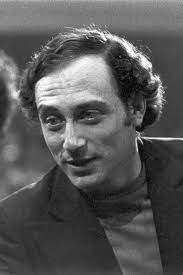
- Bezverkhny in 1967
- Born: 27 July 1947 (age 79); Leningrad, Russian SFSR, Soviet Union
- Education: Central Music School of the Conservatory of Saint Petersburg, Moscow Conservatory
- Occupations: Violinist, violist, composer

Mikhail Lvovich Bezverkhny (Russian: Михаил Львович Безверхний; born 27 July 1947) is a Soviet and Russian violinist, violist, composer, and painter. He has been living in Belgium since 1990.

== Life and career ==
Born in Saint Petersburg in 1947, Bezverkhny commenced his violin studies at the age of 5 at the Central Music School of the Conservatory of Saint Petersburg. He was a student of Liubov Segal (student of Leopold Auer) and Jacob Riabinkov. In 1965, he started his studies at the Moscow Conservatory under Yuri Yankelevich, one of the most prominent violin professors of the 20th century. He also studied with Maya Gleyzarova, Abram Shtern and Nahum Latinsky. As a painter, he studied art for 14 years from 1976 to 1990 under Vladimir Rajkov, a student of Robert Falk.

He is laureate of several international competitions for musicians:

- 1967: 2nd prize Wieniawski Competition
- 1969: 2nd prize chamber music competition in Munich
- 1972: 2nd prize violin competition in Montreal
- 1972: 1st prize chamber music competition in Belgrade
- 1974: 1st prize chamber music competition in Budapest
- 1976: 1st prize Queen Elisabeth Competition Brussels

In 1978, he was barred from leaving the USSR. In February 1990, he settled in Belgium. Since October 1992, Bezverkhny has been a member of the Shostakovich Trio, and his recordings for Melodya and Deutsche Grammophon now number more than forty. During all these years he has been very intensely active as a violinist, a violist, a composer, a director and an actor. He also worked several times with Latvian-American conductor Imant Kotsinsh (now Imant Airea). They recorded pieces by several composers which includes Spohr and Mendelssohn. Currently he is teacher at the Royal Conservatory of Ghent. His students include amongst others Yoris Jarzynski and Dmitri Berlinsky.

As a composer, he wrote a virtuoso Suite Gambrinus for violin and piano.

Long after settling in Belgium, he finally returned to painting in 2007. More than 30 of his works are now in private collections in Belgium, Germany, France, Portugal, Russia, Belarus, the Czech Republic, Monaco, Israel, Mallorca and Vatican City.

Since his retirement in 2012, Bezverkhny occasionally plays as a busker in Ghent, where he studies concert pieces. In 2019, he protested for more than 9 months against the sale of St. Annes Church in Ghent to supermarket chain Delhaize. He was supported in this struggle by a group of local residents and by Sigiswald Kuijken. When it became clear that he would lose the battle, he placed signs throughout Ghent with the text Barbarians are coming, but sheep remain silent. People of Ghent, you have lost your fighting spirit. I quit. Mikhail.

As of 2024, Bezverkhny lives out of his car and a couple of defunct caravans. Although he would be entitled to social housing, he refuses it.
