= Chloë Hanslip =

British classical violinist (born 1987)

Chloë Elise Hanslip (born 28 September 1987) is a British classical violinist.

== Biography ==
Hanslip was born in Guildford, Surrey, and has been playing the violin since she was two. At the age of four she performed solo at the Purcell Room. When she was five, she performed for Yehudi Menuhin and subsequently, at his invitation, studied with Natasha Boyarskaya at the Yehudi Menuhin School. At the age of ten, she had played in major concert halls throughout Europe and North America, including Carnegie Hall in New York City and the Royal Albert Hall in London.

In 1995 she began studying in Germany with Professor Zakhar Bron, the teacher of Maxim Vengerov and Vadim Repin. In addition to her lessons with Professor Bron, she has taken part in masterclasses and received guidance from Shlomo Mintz, Ida Haendel, Salvatore Accardo, Ruggiero Ricci and Maxim Vengerov.

In 1997 Hanslip was featured in a television documentary in Germany with Igor Oistrakh and Professor Bron. She was also featured in the BBC documentary Can You Make A Genius? screened in 2001 on BBC1 and played the child prodigy violinist alongside Ralph Fiennes and Liv Tyler in the film Onegin.

At 13 she was the youngest recording artist ever to be signed to Warner Classics UK. Her debut album, recorded with the London Symphony Orchestra under Paul Mann, was released in September 2001 to great critical acclaim. Her second CD, a recording of Max Bruch's Concerti No. 1 and No. 3 with the LSO under Martyn Brabbins, was released in 2002.

Chloë Hanslip has received numerous awards for her playing, including first prize and four special prizes in the 2nd International Violin Competition in Novosibirsk, Russia, resulting in concerts in Russia, France and Japan. In 2000 she was awarded a Scholarship by the Sibelius Foundation, one of Finland’s highest honours, presented by the Finnish Ambassador. Also in 2000 she was nominated by Justus Frantz for the Prix Davidoff. In 2002 she was awarded the Echo Klassik Award for Best Young Artist for her debut album “Chloë”.

In July 2001, Hanslip gave a private recital at Frogmore House, Windsor, for Prince Philip, Duke of Edinburgh and performed at St. James's Palace in December 2001 before Princess Anne, the Princess Royal. Chloë was invited to perform again for the Duke of Edinburgh at the Old Royal Naval College, Greenwich in May 2002.

In October 2001, Hanslip performed at the Royal Albert Hall with the Philharmonia Orchestra and at New Year she gave two performances of Mendelssohn's Concerto in E minor as soloist with the LSO at the Barbican. She performed the Bruch Concerto No. 1 with both the London Mozart Players and the City of London Sinfonia to great acclaim and went on to perform with The Royal Liverpool Philharmonic, the Sønderjyllands Symfoniorkester and the Royal Scottish National Orchestra. She made her Japanese concerto debut with the Tokyo Philharmonic, in 2003. The same year, she won the Classical Brits Young Performer award.

In 2017, Hanslip became the first Artist in Association at the Northern Chamber Orchestra.

Hanslip plays a 1737 Guarneri del Gesù violin.
