= London Musici =

Chamber orchestra based in London

London Musici is a chamber orchestra founded in 1988 by Mark Stephenson. It has given over 1000 performances as the associate orchestra for the Rambert Dance Company and has won numerous awards.

Along with chamber groups drawn from among its members, the orchestra has recorded numerous CDs.
