= HA Schult =

German installation, happening and conceptual artist

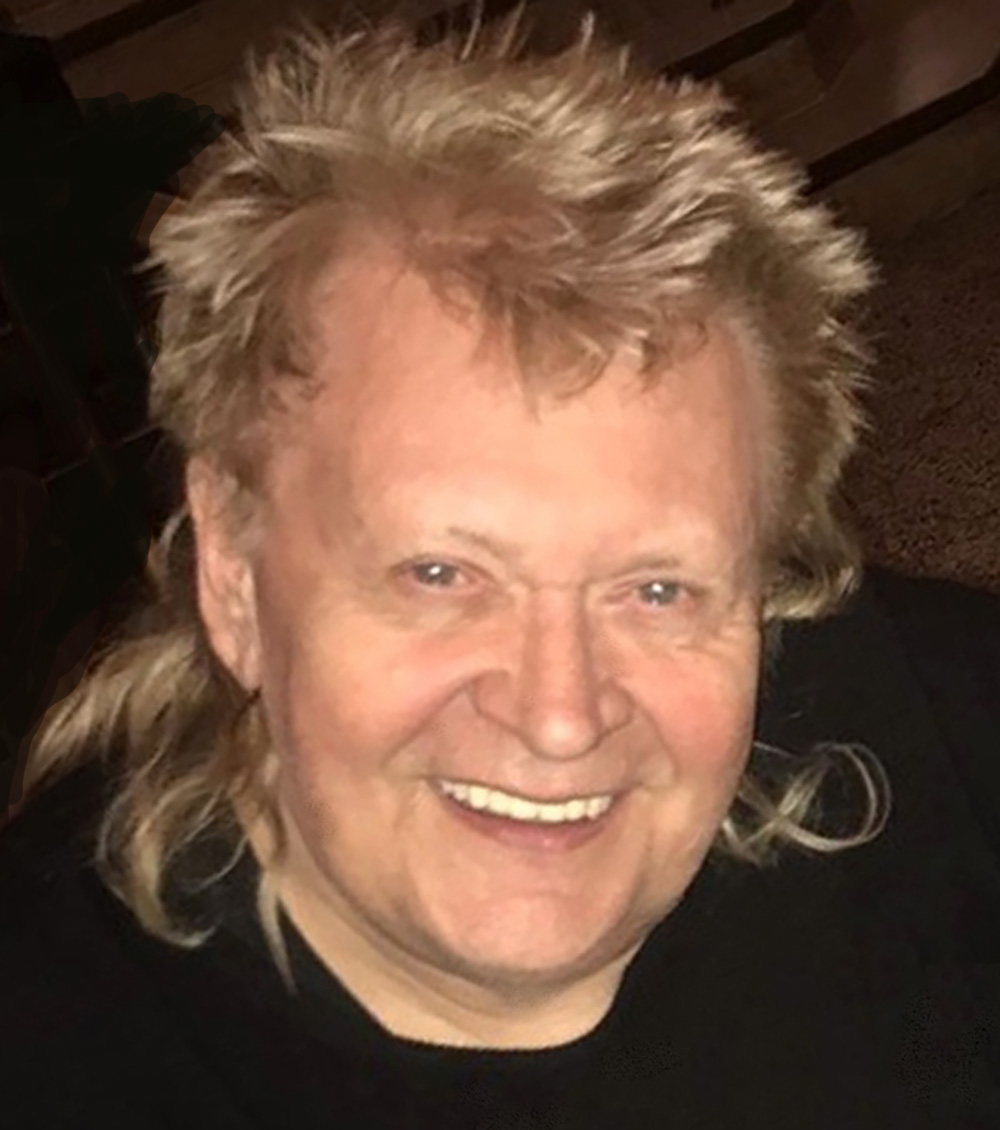
- Born: 24 June 1939 (age 87); Parchim, Germany
- Known for: Object and performance art

Hans-Jürgen Schult (born 24 June 1939), known professionally as HA Schult, is a German installation, happening and conceptual artist known primarily for his object and performance art and more specifically his work with garbage. He is one of the first artists to deal with the world's ecological imbalance in his work and has therefore been called an "eco-art pioneer". His best known works include the touring work, Trash People, which exhibited on all continents, and the Save The Beach hotel, a building made of garbage.

== Life ==
HA Schult was born in Parchim, Mecklenburg. He studied art at the Kunstakademie Düsseldorf from 1958 to 1961, where he was a student of Georg Meistermann, Joseph Fassbender, and Karl Otto Götz. Among his fellow students were Gotthard Graubner, Kuno Gonschior and, in 1961, Sigmar Polke, Gerhard Richter, and Franz Erhard Walther. At that time, he was mainly inspired by three artists: Yves Klein, Georges Mathieu and Jackson Pollock.

From 1962 to 1967 he worked as an art director for a German bank and some industrial companies. From 1967 to 1978 he lived as an artist in Munich and has also performed a range of diversified jobs over time, including a spell as a taxi driver. During the late 1970s Schult lived in Cologne and from 1980 to 1986 chiefly in New York City, where he became acquainted with Roy Lichtenstein and Robert Rauschenberg. However, Schult had problems establishing a reputation as an artist in the US, which he attributed to his criticism of America's consumption-driven mentality. He moved back to Germany in 1986. Schult has been situated in Cologne since 1990.

His son is the German film director, Kolin Schult. Schult was married to Elke Koska for 25 years, who Schult considers his muse - she was also (and still is) his manager, now in cooperation with Anna Zlotovskaya, the Russian classical violinist, Schult married in 2010.

== Field of art ==
Schult works in the tradition of Pop Art, being influenced by commercial advertising and a critical view of consumerism, but also creates happenings. Peter Ludwig from the Museum Ludwig, Cologne, says: "The entire art movement of the sixties, which was combined under the expression Pop Art, was nothing more than the large-scale attempt to bring art back into a very close relationship with life. ... An action like the one by HA Schult follows here the same line, the attempt to fuse art and life again into one unit, which of course still gives the individual the liberty to accept this as art or not." For instance, in Cologne, a happening staged by Schult involving "19 luxury cars worth a total of over 4 million marks (1.8 million dollars)" caused what was described by one source as the "world's most expensive traffic jam". However, Schult primarily uses trash as an artistic material both for his object art and happenings. The artist calls himself a "Macher", a German word that can mean a "maker" or "worker." According to David Sim, Kim Levin and others, Schult's public extravaganzas have been compared with those of Christo and Jeff Koons. Schult describes himself as an ardent proponent of the "new ecological consciousness" and was referred to as an "eco-art pioneer" by Washington Post writer Rachel Beckman. Art historian Jens Christian Jensen wrote about Schult: "I do not know another German artist who grasps his tasks so comprehensively, no one who has such a sense of feeling for that what matters in our times. In HA Schult the gap has been closed that has been for 200 years between art and the public." According to Peter Weibel, "For decades HA Schult has managed to stimulate public awareness using images he has experienced. He stages topics in public places, which are normally edged away from the public. His art work is always directly related to the location where it is shown. He confronts the feudalism, which is manifested in gigantic triumphant buildings with the pauperism of the exploited workers who built them. He pays tribute to the unnamed soldiers and slaves and not to the heroes and sovereigns." According to art historian Gail Levin (Rutgers University), Schult "has made a biting commentary on the indulgent aspects of western society. He calls our attention to our own conspicuous consumption, obsessively returning to the metaphor of garbage, refuse dumps, and debris. He describes his picture boxes as expressing the 'archeology of everyday life'. Indeed, his concerns are with the excesses of western culture, the rhythms of life in a throwaway society." According to Mark Bradley and Kenneth Stow, "Schult's virtuous and political correct mission to convince the world that (...) 'we live in a time of garbage' and his argument that [his] 'social sculpture' operated as a 'mirror of ourselves' meant that his dirty exhibits-however 'out of place' they might seem-were thoroughly sanitized and legitimated, a powerful warning about what that world might become if it did not moderate its relationship with rubbish."

== Works ==
In 1969, Schult and two of his fellow artists, Ulrich Herzog and Günter Sarrée, were arrested for covering a street in Munich with trash and paper; they referred to the event as a "happening" and dubbed it "Situation Schackstrasse". In the same year and during the early and mid-1970s, Schult produced Biokinetic Situations, exhibited at the Museum Morsbroich in Leverkusen and the documenta V in Kassel, installed either on the floors of the museums or within large vitreous display cases, also called "picture boxes". Many of these "situations" shown in over-dimensional glass show cabinets are miniature landscapes consisting of trash, small children's playthings and bacteria, thereby promoting the archeology of an anticipated future. For instance, in an obvious allusion to Neuschwanstein Castle, Schult created Schloss Neu-Wahnstein (1983-1987, Museum Ludwig, Cologne), "built on traditional assembly techniques of Dadaism. As is typical for collages and assemblies, they break the typical perception of the viewer and create new contexts." As these works were both inspired by the romantic painting of Caspar David Friedrich and the modern age of consumption and waste, German critics such as Siegfried Salzmann and Hilmar Frank pointed out that Schult has been called "the Romantic of the consumption age" or "Caspar David Friedrich of the consumption age." The artist describes himself as "a Romantic of the consumption age" and "a great moralist".

Der Müll des Franz Beckenbauer: In 1974, Schult stole the contents of the waste containers of the international footballer, Franz Beckenbauer and presented what he had found in the Lenbachhaus, Munich.

Venezia vive: In 1976, the artist filled St. Mark's Square in Venice with old newspapers in an overnight action that surprised the Venetian people and authorities. He called this happening Venezia vive.

Crash: As his contribution to the 1977 documenta VI, he hired a stunt pilot to crash a Cessna into the garbage dump on Staten Island, New York. This happening, which was sent via satellite to the screens in Kassel, he called Crash.

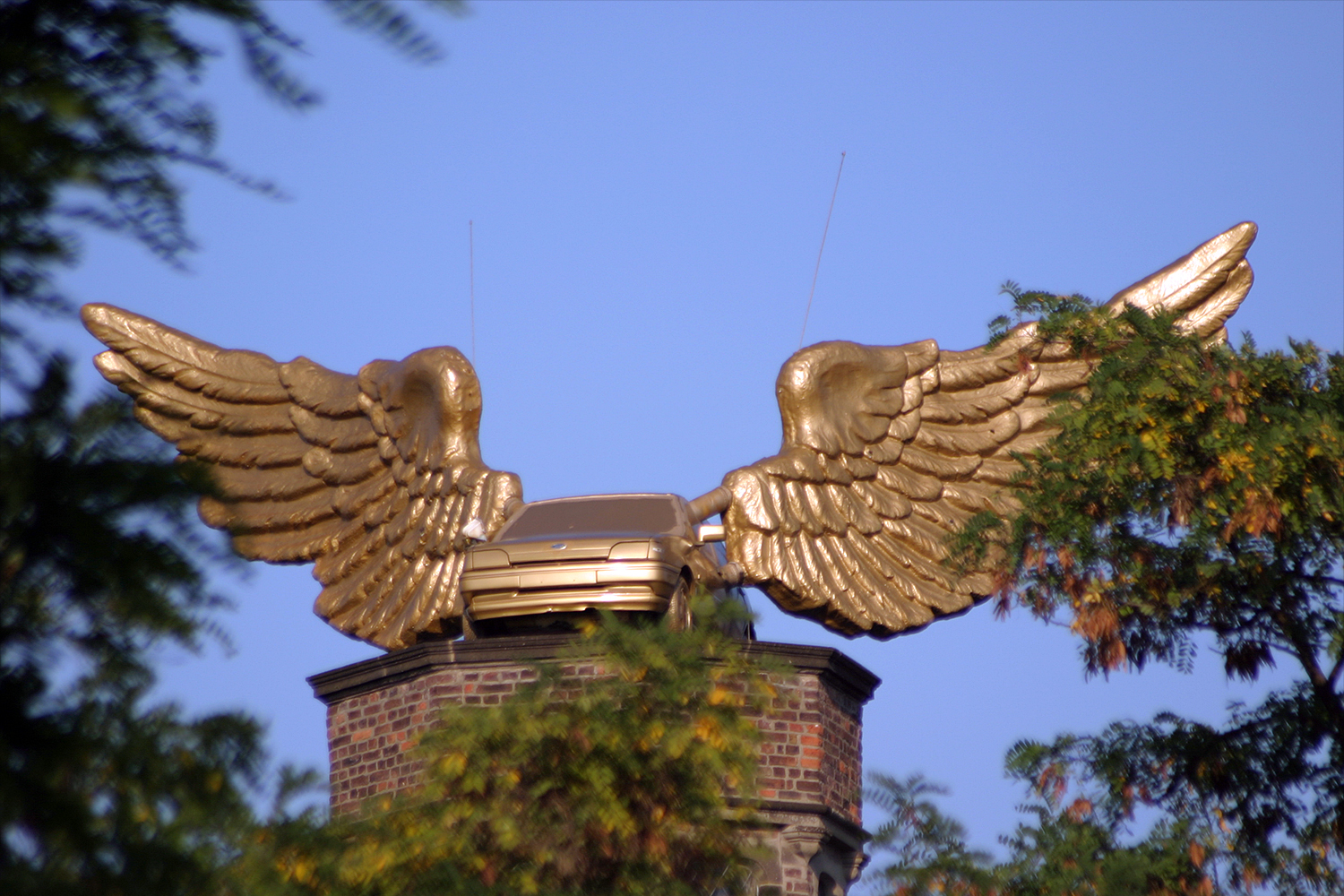
Flügelauto (winged car)

Now!: In 1983, he created a paper river in downtown New York, using old issues of the New York Times and called this happening Now!

The Flügelauto (winged car) is a car as a golden bird. Created in 1991 as part of the performance Fetisch Auto (Fetish Car) in Cologne, this work of art is now displayed on the roof of the Kölnisches Stadtmuseum (Museum of the City of Cologne). Citing the protection of historic monuments, Franz-Josef Antwerpes, the former District President of Cologne, demanded the removal of the car but the competent ministry decided that the artwork could stay in place “temporarily”.

In 1994, Schult's happenings Marble Time and Der Krieg (War and Piece) were performed on the Palace Square in Saint Petersburg, two Russian T-80 tanks being the central part of this performance.

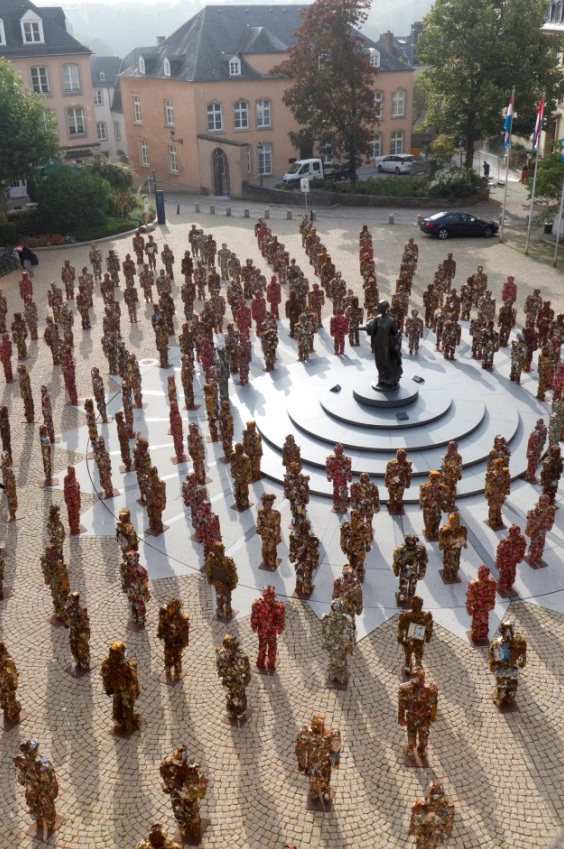
Trash People of HA Schult, Place Clairefontaine, Luxembourg 2014, government, photo by Herlinde Koelbl

Trash People: Since 1996, Schult has installed one thousand life sized Trash People made from crushed cans, electronic waste and other rubbish as his critical commentary on constant human consumption. They travelled to major tourist sites such as Moscow's Red Square (1999), the Great Wall of China (2001), and the Pyramids of Giza (2002). Schult's installation inspired Chinese artist He Chengyao's first piece of performance art titled Opening the Great Wall.

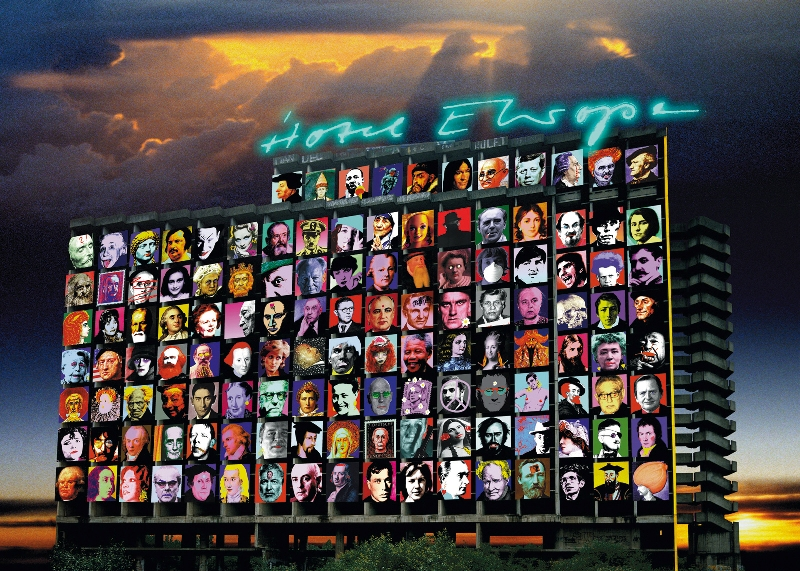
Hotel Europe HA Schult 1999

Friedensspeicher: In 1998, he created the Peace Storage Building in the harbour of Osnabrück made of thousands of corrugated boxes carrying the inscription "piece" in different languages.

Hotel Europe: In 1999, at Cologne-Bonn airport autobahn, Schult realized Hotel Europe, an empty multistory building covered with 130 oversize portraits of celebrities. It was referred to as the world's largest sculpture until it was blown up on 13 May 2001.

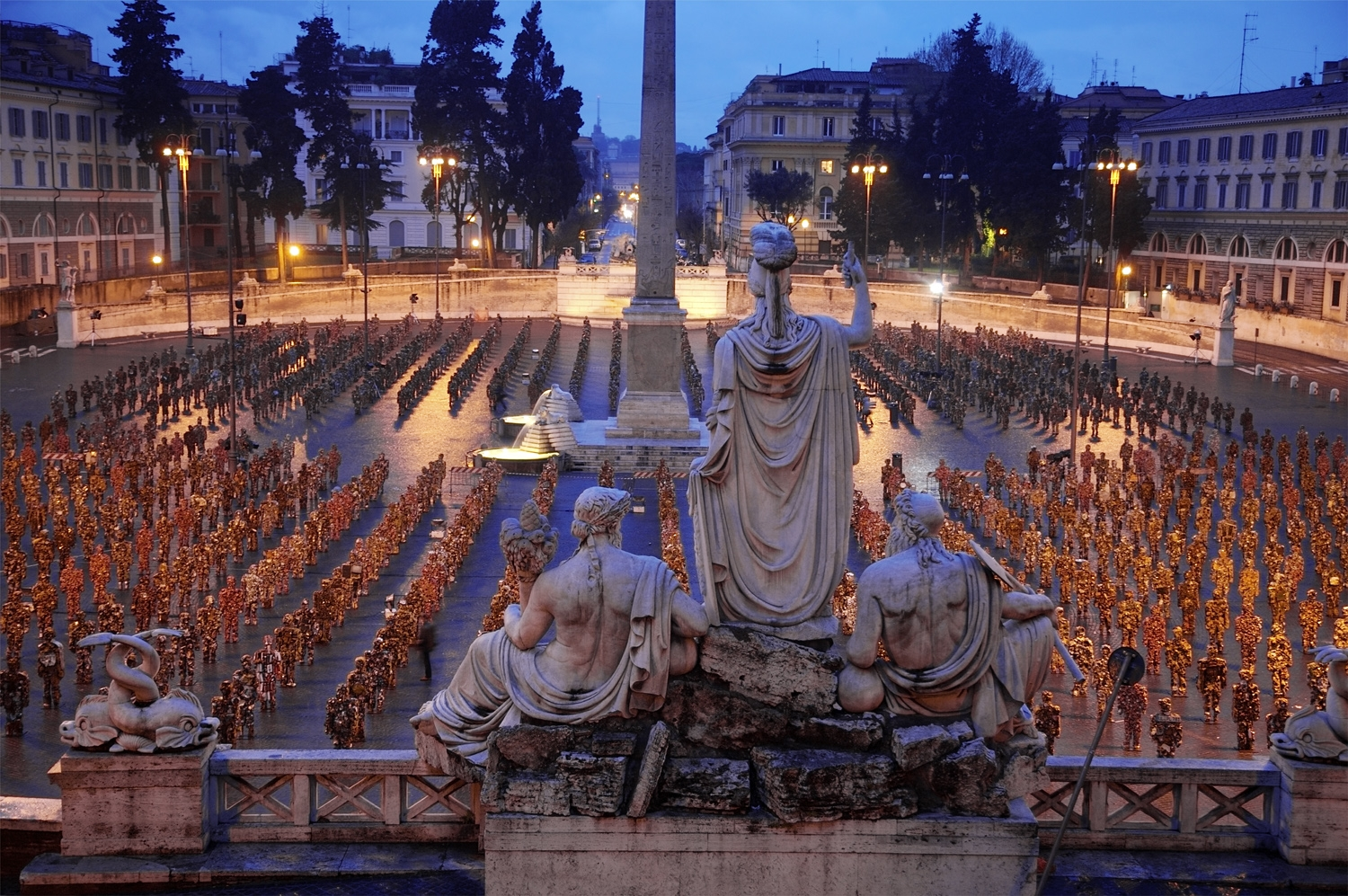
Trash People Roma 2007

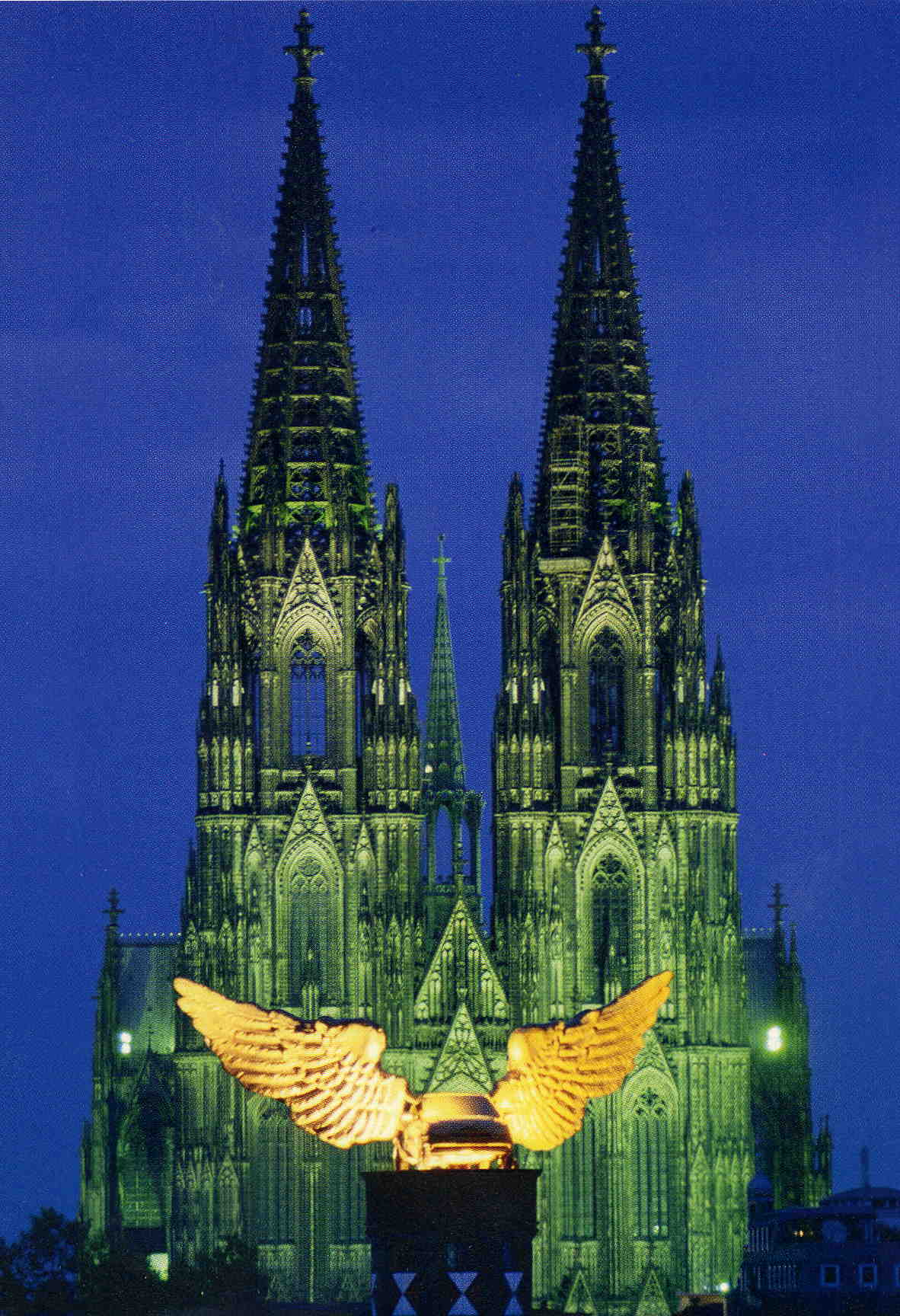
Flügelauto

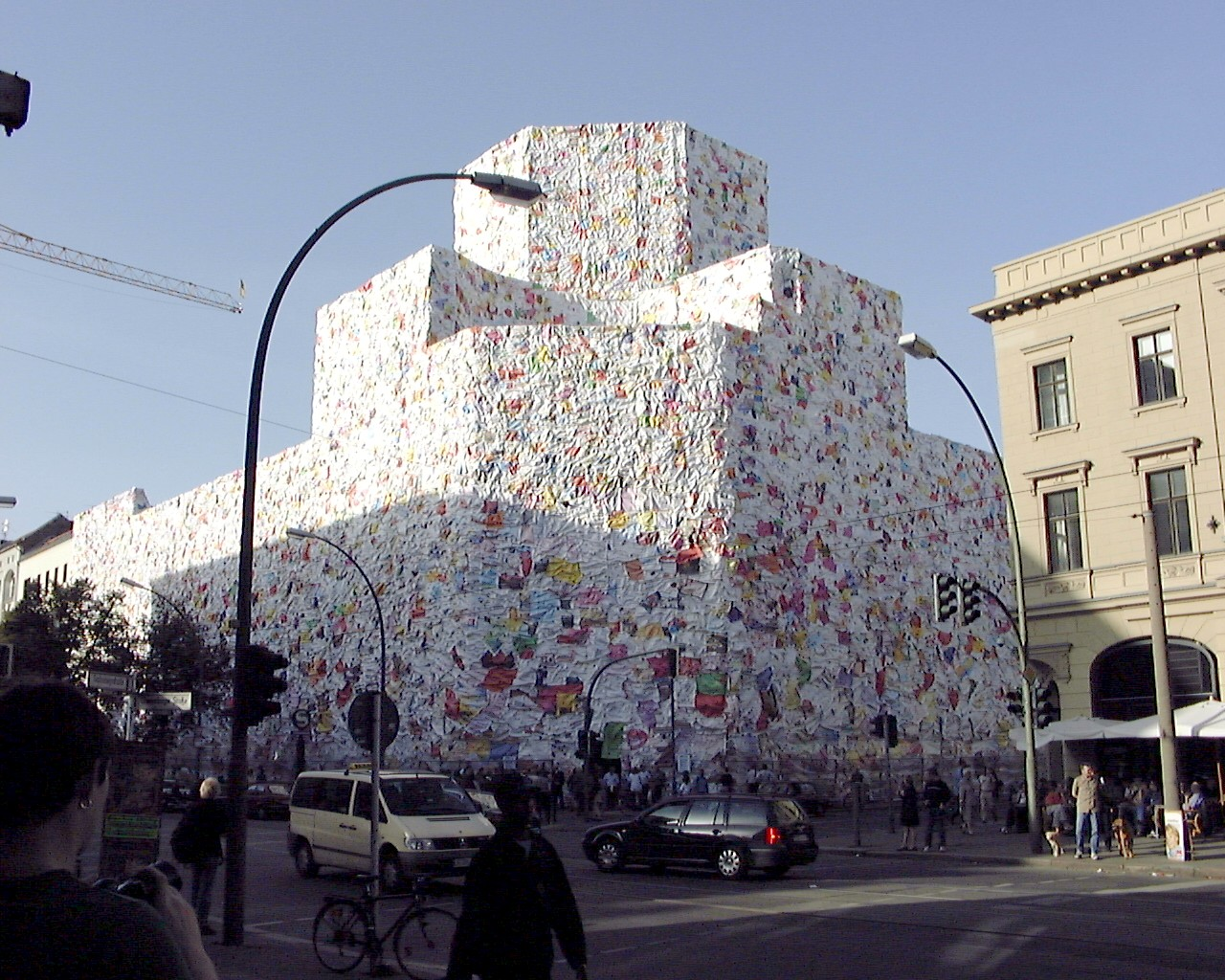
Postfuhramt Loveletters, 2001, Postfuhramt, Berlin

Love Letters Building: In 2001, the artist created his Love Letters Building in Berlin-Mitte by covering the front of the old Berlin Postfuhramt (post office) with hundreds of thousands of love letters.

Trees for Peace (Friedensbäume): In 2003, HA Schult decorated the birch trees on the premises of the Zollverein coal mine in Essen with thousands of painted, written and photographic wishes for peace.

AutoDom: In 2006, Schult created the AutoDom sculpture, using parts from Ford Fiesta and Ford Fusion cars to build a symbolic bridge between Cologne and New York City.

Save the Beach: In 2010, Schult created a hotel made of garbage in order to raise awareness of the amount of waste being washed up on European shores. According to the artist, “The philosophy of this hotel is to expose the damage we are causing to the sea and the coastline. We live in the era of trash and we are running the risk of becoming trash ourselves. Do we really want this world?” This work was exhibited in June 2010 in Rome and in January 2011 in Madrid.

In March 2013, he created a heart out of garbage collected by pupils from Paderborn in order to demonstrate the young people what they are throwing away daily. This happening was part of an exhibition of his works at the Diözesanmuseum Paderborn.

In 2015, Schult started his Action Blue world tour with a hybrid electric car from Paris to Beijing, which critically reflects the natural resources air and water on earth. This journey, including stops at various art and cultural institutions, took him from Paris via Luxembourg, Trier, Karlsruhe, Cologne, Düsseldorf, Melsungen, Berlin, Warsaw, Vilnius, Riga, Tallinn, Saint Petersburg, Moscow, Nizhny Novgorod, Kazan, Chaykovsky, Ufa, Chelyabinsk, Petropavl, Astana, Karaganda, Balkhash City, Balkhash Lake, Almaty, Dunhuang, Yueya Quan, through the Gobi desert and Yinchuan, Yan'An, Xi'an, Taiyuan, Shijiazhuang to Beijing. The artist also created "Aqua Pictures", using samples collected during that tour.

Schult's art is to be found in many public collections, such as the Solomon R. Guggenheim Museum, NYC; the Museum of Modern Art, NYC; the Roy Lichtenstein Foundation, NYC; the National Gallery of Art, Washington, DC; the Tate Gallery, London; the Centre Pompidou, Paris; the State Russian Museum, St. Petersburg; the Zendai Museum, Shanghai; the Neue Galerie im Joanneum, Graz; the Center for Art and Media, Karlsruhe; the Museum Ludwig, Cologne; the German Historical Museum, Berlin; the Museum of Contemporary History of Germany, Bonn; and the Getty Research Institute, Los Angeles, CA.

== Critical voices ==
In an interview in Frankfurter Allgemeine Zeitung on the occasion of the artist's 70th birthday, Philip Krohn noted that art critics have described Schult's work as overly commercial and shallow, and said that he has had no new ideas in a long time. Some conservative critics in the 1960s questioned whether Schult's early works qualify as art. What was being criticized were happenings such as the "Situation Schackstraße" (1969), but also happenings and installations such as the Biokinetic Situation in the Museum Morsbroich (1969). Others have argued that Schult's works are too bizarre for the commercial art market.

== HA Schult Museum and ÖkoGlobe-Institut ==
In 1986, the artist founded the HA Schult Museum für Aktionskunst in Essen. In 1992, this museum was moved to Cologne. In 2009, Schult was the founder of the ÖkoGlobe-Institut, established at the University Duisburg-Essen. He is also one of the directors of this eco institute.
