= Yuri Yankelevich =

Soviet violin pedagogue (1909–1973)

Yuri Isayevich Yankelevich (Russian: Юрий Исаевич Янкелевич; 7 March 1909 – 22 September 1973) was a Soviet violin pedagogue who taught many internationally known virtuosos during his long tenure at the Moscow Conservatory.

== Life and career ==
Yuri Yankelevich was born in Basel, Switzerland. His father, Isay Leontyevich Yankelevich, a prominent lawyer, was one of the founders of the Omsk Philharmonic Society. In Omsk, young Yuri studied with Leopold Auer's student, Anisim Berlin, a grandfather of Natalia Gutman. In 1923, he entered Leningrad Conservatory, the class of Hovhaness Nalbandian (also a student of Leopold Auer). On Yankelevich's graduation composer Alexander Glazunov commented: "a career of a virtuoso violinist would certainly be his calling". In 1932, he graduated from the Moscow Conservatory under professor Abram Yampolsky, and finished his doctorate degree in 1937. Between 1930 and 1937, he was an assistant concertmaster in the Moscow Philharmonic Orchestra, and afterwards concentrated primarily on pedagogical activities. Since 1934, he taught at the Moscow Conservatory School, the Moscow Conservatory College, and at the Moscow Conservatory senior division (first as Yampolsky's assistant, and later leading his own studio, eventually becoming a head of the violin department). He was also devoted to the theory of violin playing, creating a series of methodological publications. Yankelevich died in Moscow.

== Notable students ==
- Ruben Aharonyan
- Levon Ambartsumian
- Felix Andrievsky
- Boris Belkin
- Mikhaïl Bezverkhny
- Irina Bochkova
- Alexandre Brussilovsky
- Taras Gabora
- Eva Graubin
- Tatiana Grindenko
- Ilya Grubert
- Leonid Kogan
- Mikhail Kopelman
- Bogodar Kotorovych
- Vladimir Landsman
- Albert Markov
- Dora Schwarzberg
- Nelli Shkolnikova
- Vladimir Spivakov
- Vesna Stefanovich-Gruppman
- Viktor Tretyakov
- Grigori Zhislin
