= Academic Music College =

Educational institution in Moscow, Russia

Coordinates: 55.756082°N 37.5967738°E

- Академическое музыкальное училище при Московской государственной консерватории им. П. И. Чайковского
- Former names: Public Music College
- Established: 1891
- Founders: Valentina Zograf-Plaksina
- Parent institution: Moscow Conservatory
- Location: Moscow
- Website: www.amumgk.ru
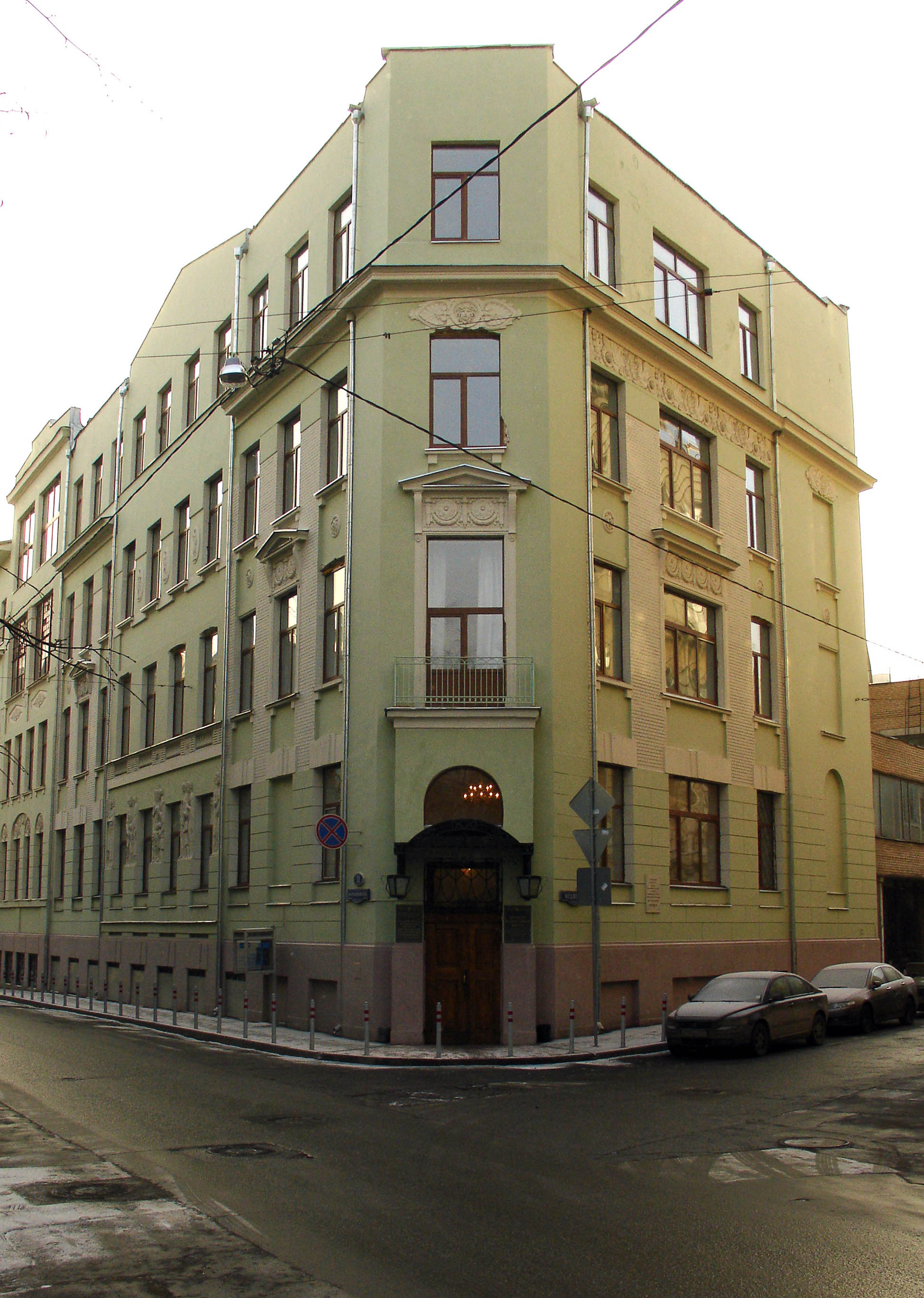

Academic Music College, fully Tchaikovsky Academic Music College at the Moscow State Conservatory (Russian: Академическое музыкальное училище при Московской государственной консерватории им. П. И. Чайковского) is an educational institution located in Moscow, Russia.

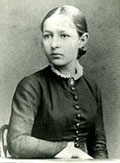
Valentina Zograf-Plaksina, founder of the college

== History ==
Founded in 1891 as Public Music College by pianist Valentina Zograf-Plaksina, the college was given the name of and an official attachment to the Moscow Conservatory in 1936.

== Overview ==
Academic Music College's full graduate program lasts four years. Entry exams are normally held for students age 15, although students from the vocal department are usually older. Its diploma gives graduates the right to work professionally as teachers, orchestra players, conductors, operatic and choir soloists. The Academic Music College can also be considered a preparatory stage for further advancement in higher education institutions such as conservatories and universities. In that capacity, the college serves as an intermediary educational body. The college also has its own junior division, Music School.

In musical circles, Academic Music College is often informally called Merzliakov College, or simply Merzliakovka, after the street on which it is located.

== Notable alumni ==
- Valery Afanassiev (b. 1947), pianist, writer and conductor
- Andrei Eshpai (1925–2015), composer, People's Artist of the USSR
- Dmitry Kabalevsky (1904–1987), composer and teacher
- Vladimir Landsman (b. 1941), Soviet-Canadian violinist and teacher
- Roman Moiseyev (b. 1960), conductor
- Natasha Paremski (b. 1987), Russian-American classical pianist
- Viktor Tretiakov (b. 1946), violinist and conductor
- Arcadi Volodos (b. 1972), pianist
