= Vesna Stefanovich-Gruppman =

Serbian musician

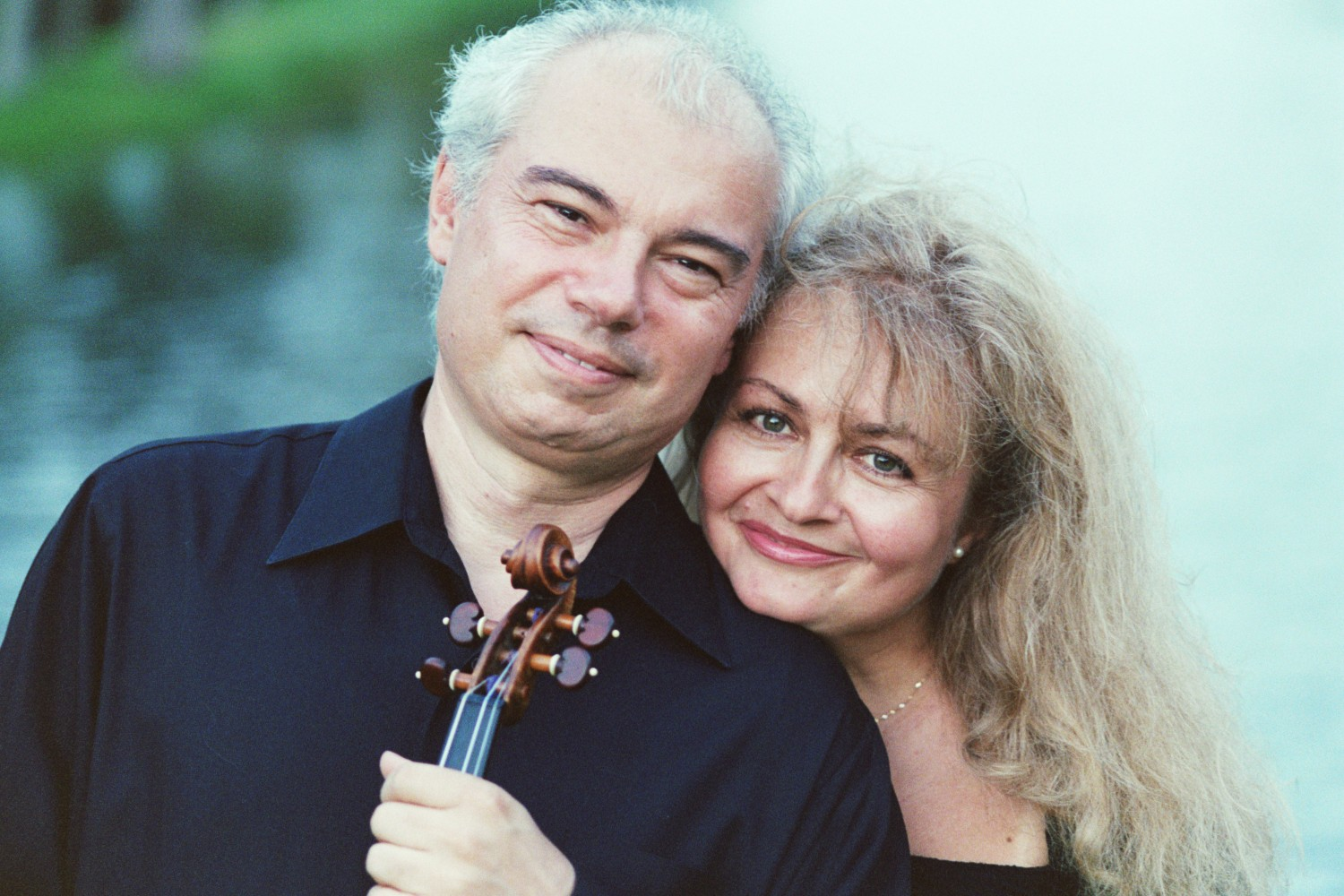
- Vesna and Igor Gruppman
- Born: Yugoslavia
- Education: Moscow Conservatoire, Moscow Central Special School of Music
- Occupations: Violin and viola soloist
- Spouse: Igor Gruppman
- Website: vesnagruppman.com

Vesna Stefanovich-Gruppman is a Serbian violin and viola professor at the Rotterdam Conservatory (CODARTS), a position she has held since 2006.

== Biography ==
Stefanovich was born in Serbia which was then part of Yugoslavia. She met her future husband, Igor Gruppman, while they were both students at the Moscow Conservatory.

Vesna Stefanovich's solo career began when she was still a teenager, receiving First Prize at the Jaroslav Kocián International Violin Competition and becoming the first artist to win the National Violin Competition in her native Yugoslavia six times in a row. By the age of sixteen, she had performed as a soloist with such ensembles as the Munich Chamber Orchestra, the Moscow Philharmonic and the Prague Philharmonic.

She graduated from the Moscow Central Special School of Music and received her doctorate in performance and pedagogy from the Moscow Conservatoire, where she studied under the legendary teachers Yuri Yankelevich and Igor Bezrodny. Later, she studied with David Oistrakh.

Vesna Stefanovich-Gruppman also enjoys a pedagogical career. She is director of the Gruppman International Music Institute and teaches violin and viola at the Rotterdam Conservatory. In 2002, the American String Teachers Association honoured Vesna Stefanovich-Gruppman with the "Colleague Teacher of the Year" award.

Critically acclaimed for her "impeccable taste and beautiful singing tone", she regularly appears as a soloist and chamber musician. Most recently she has played with the Dallas Symphony, the Edmonton Symphony, Concerto Rotterdam Chamber Orchestra, the San Diego Symphony Orchestra, the National Philharmonic Orchestra of Ukraine and the London Philharmonic Orchestra, and in recital at London's Wigmore Hall and St John's in Smith Square, Amsterdam's Hermitage Hall, Kiev's Philharmonic Hall and the Mozart Hall in Prague.

Her solo and chamber music recordings have won high praise from such international publications as Gramophone Magazine, American Record Guide and Classical Disc Digest. Her recording of the Concerto for Two Violins and Orchestra by Malcolm Arnold (together with her violinist husband Igor Gruppman) for Koch International won a Grammy Award.

Gruppman was a professor at Brigham Young University and a founding member of the Orchestra at Temple Square which is currently conducted by her husband Igor.
