= Igor Gruppman =

Ukrainian violinist and conductor (born 1956)

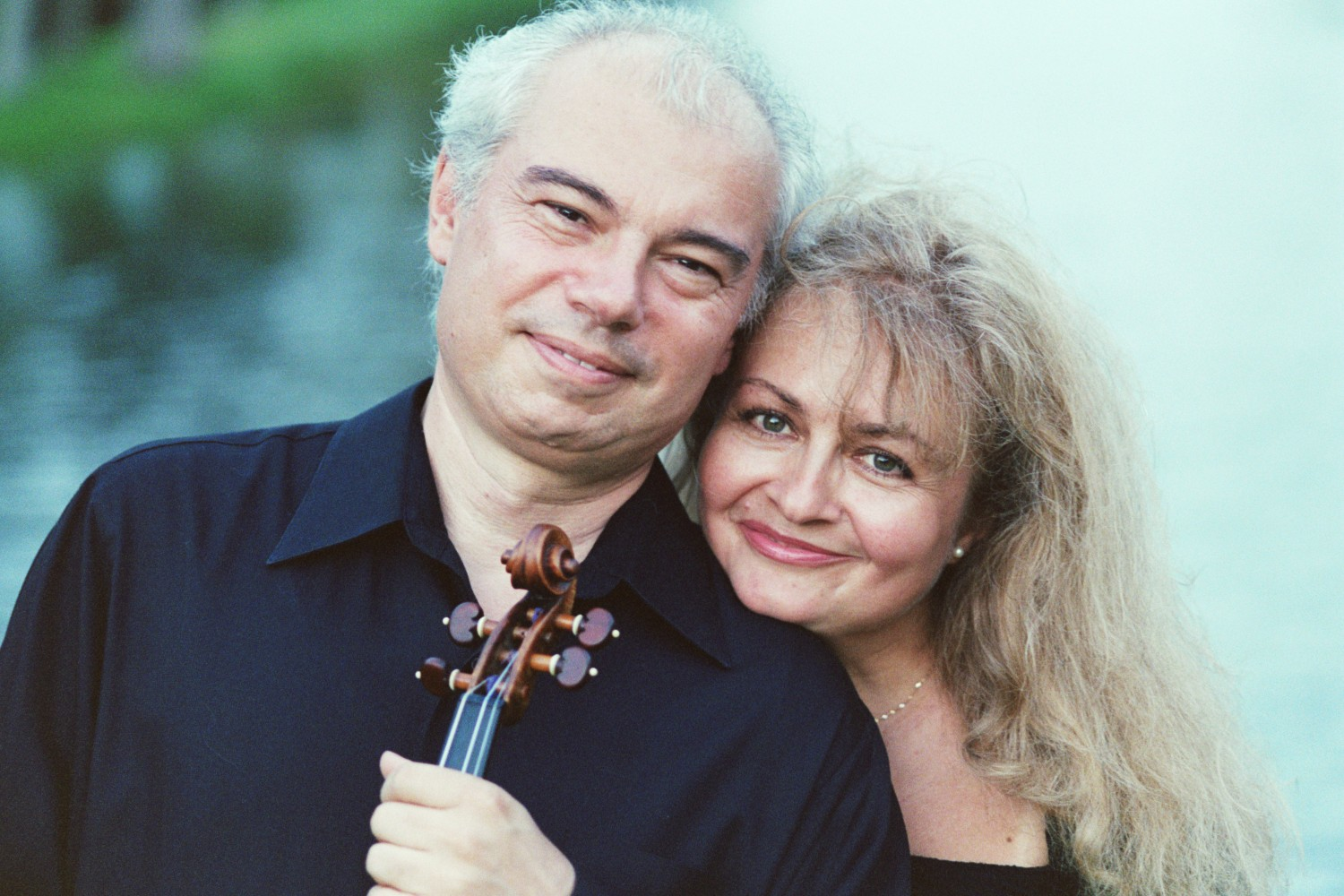
- Igor and Vesna Gruppman
- Born: July 4, 1956 (age 70); Kiev, Soviet Union
- Education: Moscow Conservatory
- Occupations: Concertmaster of the Rotterdam Philharmonic Orchestra, Conductor of the Orchestra at Temple Square, violin soloist
- Years active: 1967-present
- Spouse: Vesna Stefanovich-Gruppman
- Website: igorgruppman.com

Igor Gruppman (born July 4, 1956) is a Ukrainian-born violinist and conductor. He is the Principal Conductor of the Orchestra at Temple Square in Salt Lake City, Utah, a position he has held since 2003. In May 2009, Igor Gruppman was appointed by Valery Gergiev to the position of music director of the newly formed Mariinsky Stradivary Orchestra. He currently also is Concertmaster of the Rotterdam Philharmonic Orchestra.

Gruppman is a native of Kiev, Ukraine. He made his debut performance at the Kiev Philharmonic Hall in 1967. He is a graduate of the Moscow Conservatory where he studied under Leonid Kogan and Mstislav Rostropovich. Gruppman also studied with Jascha Heifetz at the USC School of Music in Los Angeles.

Gruppman emigrated to the United States with his family in 1979. Soon after his future wife, Vesna Stefanovich-Gruppman, whom he had known at Moscow Central Music School and at Moscow Conservatory, also came to the United States, they were married.

Igor Gruppman was the concertmaster of the San Diego Symphony from 1988 to 1995. He also was concertmaster of the London Symphony Orchestra from 1995 to 1998. He was Associate Conductor of the Florida Philharmonic from 1997 to 2003.

Gruppman and his wife won a Grammy Award in 1993 for the recording of Malcolm Arnold's Concerto for two violins. He and his wife lived in San Diego, California until 1997.

Gruppman and his wife Vesna Stefanovich-Gruppman were members of the music faculty at Brigham Young University from 1997 to 2003. In 1997 Gruppman was Guest concertmaster for the Royal Philharmonic Orchestra.

Igor Gruppman taught at the Idyllwild Arts Summer Program (connected with the Idyllwild Arts Foundation) in Idyllwild, California for twenty consecutive years.

In 2003 Gruppman also founded the Gruppman International Music Institute, designed to teach students from all over the world using distant-learning technologies.

Starting in 2004 Gruppman served as Concertmaster of the Rotterdam Philharmonic Orchestra. Gruppman is also currently a professor at Codarts, the Rotterdam Conservatoire.
