= Gérard Poulet =

French classical violinist

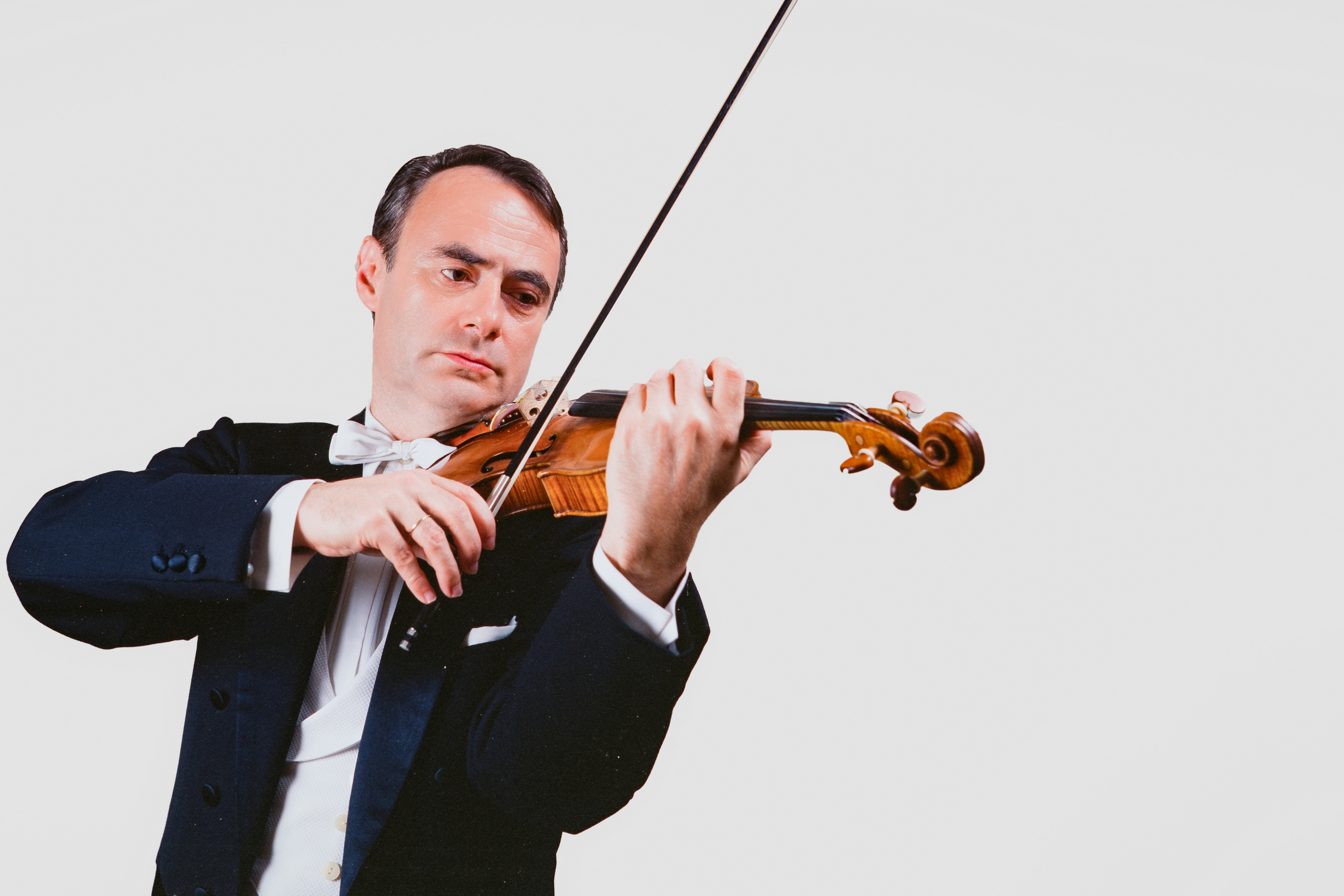
Gérard Poulet

Gérard (Georges) Poulet (born 12 August 1938) is a French classical violinist.

== Biography ==
Born in Bayonne the son of conductor Gaston Poulet, Poulet started studying the violin at age five. At 11 he entered the Conservatoire de Paris in André Asselin's class and was unanimously awarded first prize in violin at age 12. He performed Salle Gaveau the same year under the direction of his father with the Concerts Colonne.

In 1956, he won the 1st Grand Prix of the Paganini Competition in Genoa then perfected his skills with Zino Francescatti, Yehudi Menuhin, Nathan Milstein, and Henryk Szeryng. He considers the latter as "his father in music".

Poulet was professor, then honorary professor at the Conservatoire de Paris. His students included the violinists Yaïr Benaïm, Renaud Capuçon, Sarah Nemtanu, Jean-Marc Phillips-Varabédjian, Svetlin Roussev, Marie Scheublé, Klodiana Skenderi, Guillaume Sutre, Akiko Yamada, Guillaume Combet,. He was also a full professor at the École Normale de Musique de Paris and at the Tokyo University of the Arts.

In his discography, several recordings, notably Bartók's Sonata for Solo Violin and the six Bach's Sonatas and Partitas for Solo Violin, have been warmly welcomed by the critics.

== Films ==
- Une leçon particulière, directed by Claude Mouriéras, conception by Olivier Bernager and François Manceaux, 1987.
