= Ny Carlsberg Glyptotek =

Art museum in Copenhagen, Denmark

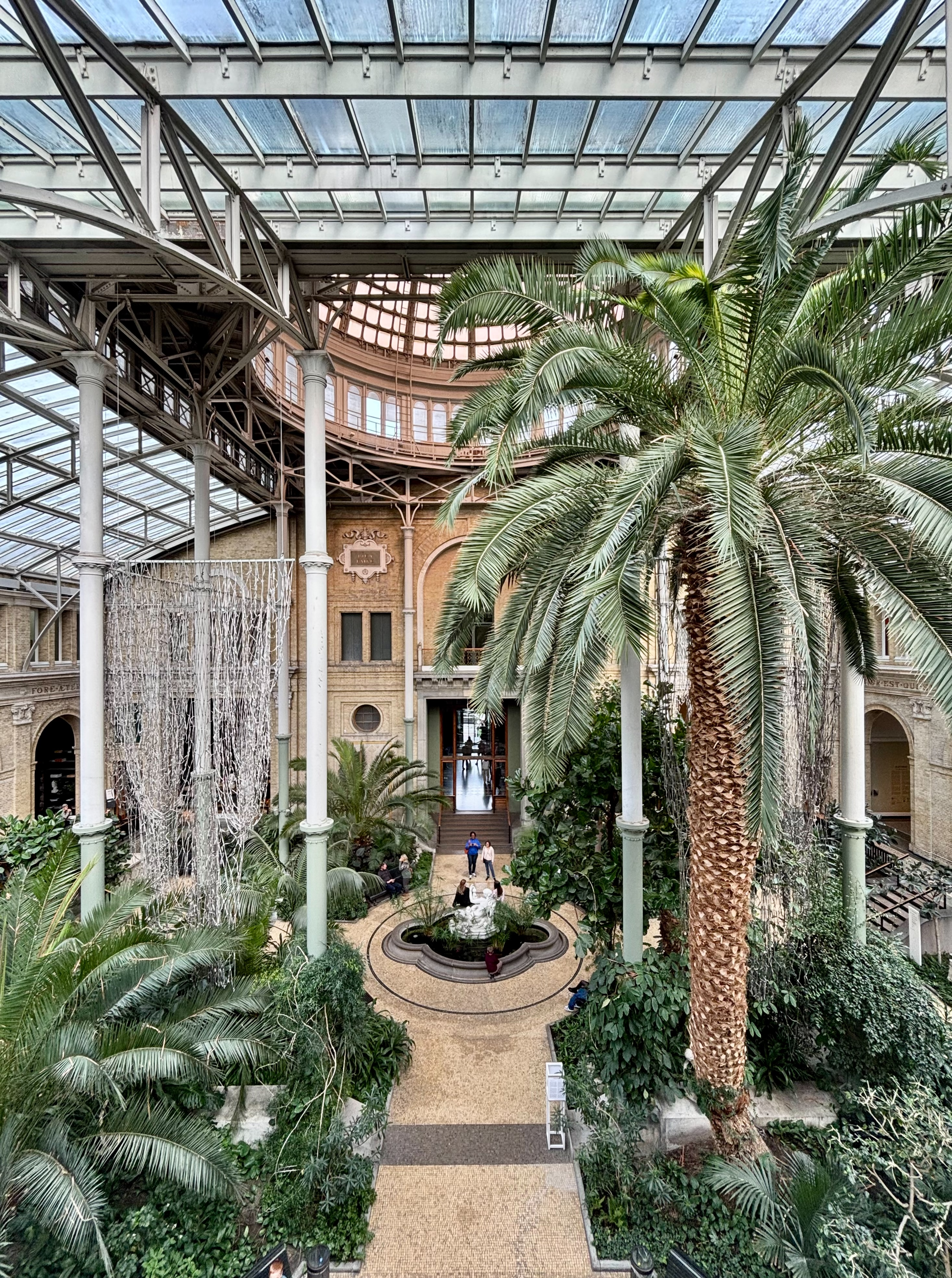
- Winter garden in New Carlsberg Glyptotek
- Interactive fullscreen map
- Established: 1897; 129 years ago
- Location: Copenhagen, Denmark
- Coordinates: 55°40′21″N 12°34′19″E
- Type: Art museum
- Key holdings: Rodin, Little Dancer of Fourteen Years, Woman with a Flower
- Collections: Ancient Greek sculpture, Roman sculpture, Post-impressionists, Danish Golden Age
- Collection size: >10,000
- Visitors: 514,608 (2019)
- Founder: Carl Jacobsen
- Director: Gertrud Hvidberg-Hansen
- Chairperson: Christine Buhl Andersen
- Architects: Vilhelm Dahlerup (1897), Hack Kampmann (1906), Henning Larsen (1996)
- Website: www.glyptoteket.com

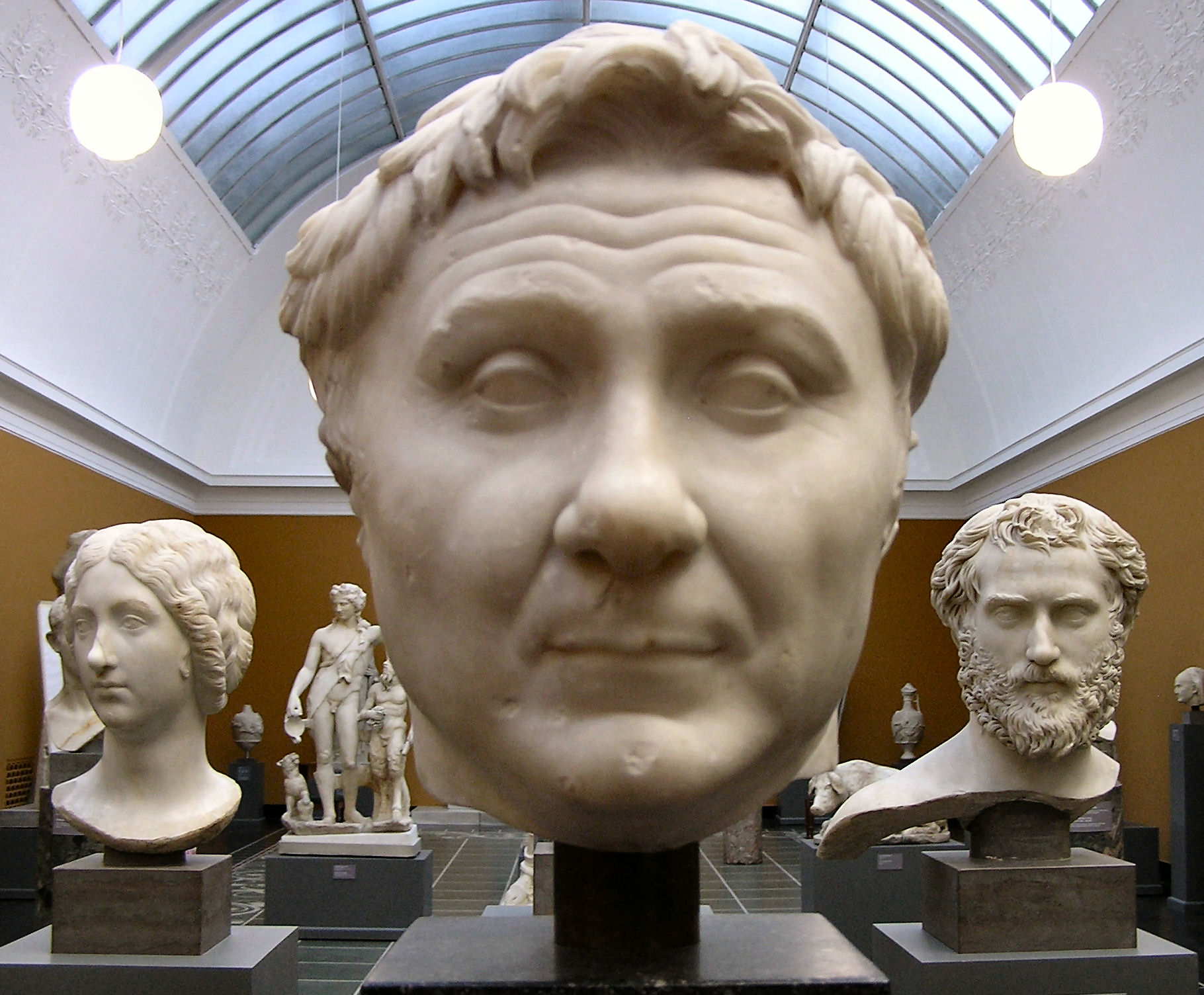
Hall of Roman figures. In the front, Pompey

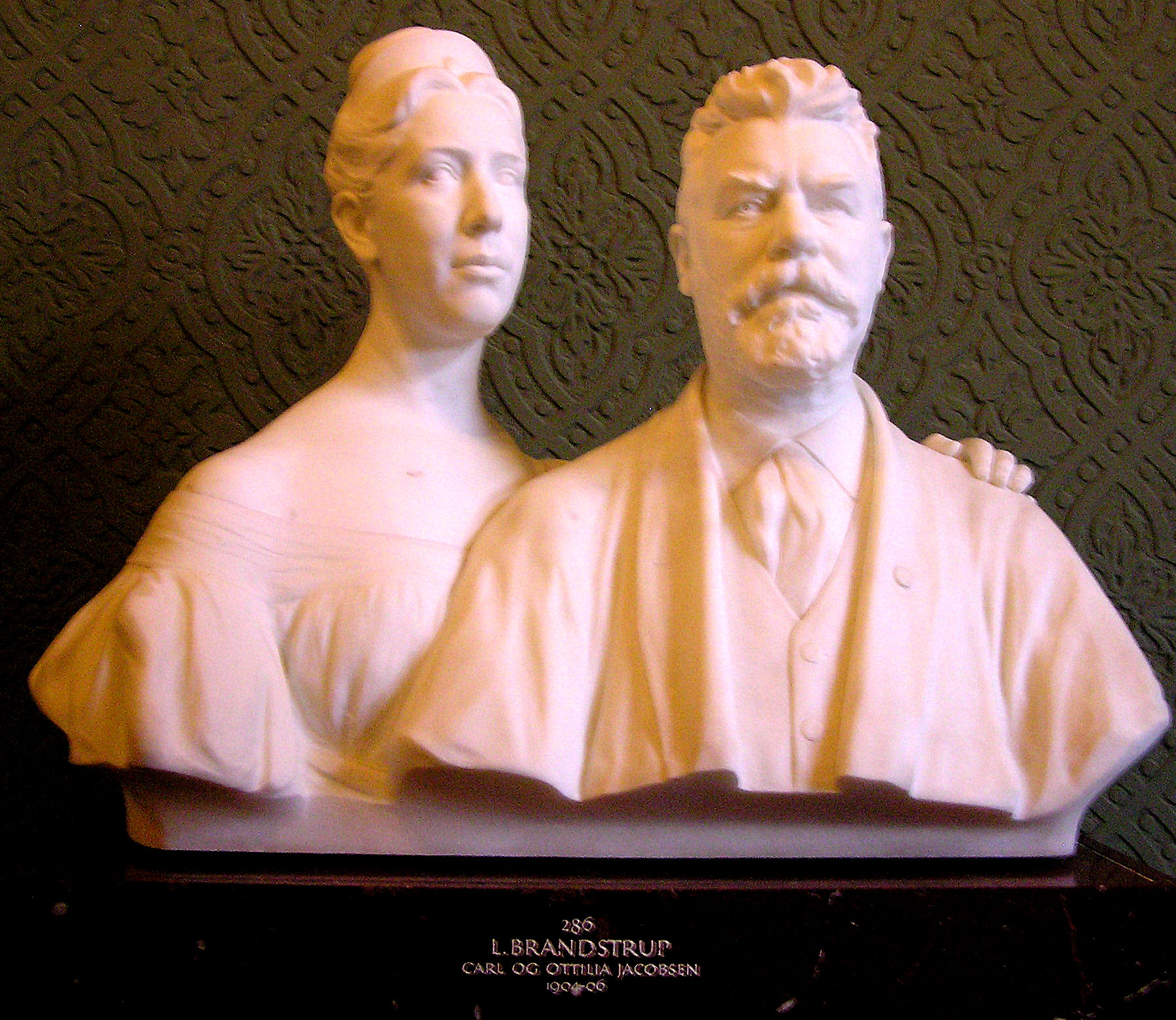
Carl Jacobsen and his wife Ottilia, sculpted by Ludvig Brandstrup

The Ny Carlsberg Glyptotek ("ny" means "new" in Danish; "Glyptotek" comes from the Greek root glyphein, to carve, and theke, storing place), commonly known simply as Glyptoteket, is an art museum in Copenhagen, Denmark. The collection represents the private art collection of Carl Jacobsen (1842–1914), the son of the founder of the Carlsberg Breweries.

Primarily a sculpture museum, as indicated by the name, the focal point of the museum is antique sculpture from the ancient cultures around the Mediterranean, including Egypt, Rome and Greece, as well as more modern sculptures such as a collection of Auguste Rodin's works, considered to be the most important outside France. However, the museum is equally noted for its collection of paintings that includes an extensive collection of French impressionists and Post-impressionists as well as Danish Golden Age paintings.

The French Collection includes works by painters such as Jacques-Louis David, Monet, Pissarro, Renoir, Degas and Cézanne, as well as those by Post-impressionists such as van Gogh, Gauguin, Toulouse-Lautrec and Bonnard. The museum's collection includes all the bronze sculptures of Degas, including the series of dancers. Numerous works by Norwegian-Danish sculptor Stephan Sinding are featured prominently in various sections of the museum.

== History ==
=== First Glyptoteque ===
Carl Jacobsen was a dedicated art collector. He was particularly interested in antique art, but over the years he also acquired a considerable collection of French and Danish sculptures. When his private villa in 1882 was extended with a winter garden, sculptures soon outnumbered plants in it. The same year the collection was opened to the public. In the following years the museum was expanded on a number of occasions to meet the need for more space for his steadily growing collections. In 1885 his 'house museum' had grown to a total of 19 galleries, the first 14 of which had been designed by Vilhelm Dahlerup while Hack Kampmann had built the last four as well as conducted a redesign of the winter garden.

=== New museum ===
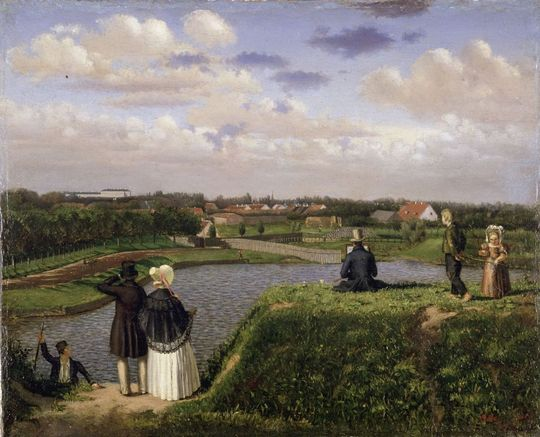
View from Holck's Bastion of the site which was chosen for the new Glyptotek, painting from 1839 by Sally Henriques

In spite of the many extensions, it was finally clear the existing premises were inadequate and that a new building was needed. On 8 March 1888 Carl Jacobsen donated his collection to the Danish State and the City of Copenhagen on condition that they provided a suitable building for its exhibition. Copenhagen's old fortifications had recently been abandoned and a site was chosen on a ravelin outside Holcks Bastion in the city's Western Rampart, just south of the Tivoli Gardens which had been founded in 1843. Jacobsen was displeased with the location which he found to be too far from the city centre and he had also reservations about the proximity of Tivoli which he found common. Instead he wanted a building on the emerging new city hall square, yet in the end he accepted.

It was Carl Jacobsen who chose the name for the museum, with inspiration from Ludwig I's Glyptothek in Munich, as well as Vilhelm Dahlerup as the architect for the assignment. The moat around the radan was filled and the new museum opened first on 1 May 1897. At first it only included Jacobsen's modern collection with French and Danish works from the 18th century.

In January 1899 Carl Jacobsen donated his collection of Antique art to the museum which made an expansion necessary. It was designed by Hack Kampmann while Dahlerup designed a winter garden which connected the new wing to the old building. It was inaugurated in 1906.

In 1996 the museum was once again extended, this time with an infill constructed in one of its courtyards to the design of Henning Larsen. In 2006, the building underwent a major renovation programme under the direction of Danish architects Dissing + Weitling. and Bonde Ljungar Arkitekter MAA.

== Architecture ==
The building is often noted for its elegance in its own right and the synthesis it creates with the works of art.

The Dahlerup Wing, the oldest part of the museum, is a lavish historicist building. The façade is in red brick with polished granite columns in a Venetian renaissance style. It houses the French and Danish collections.

The Kampmann Wing is a more simple, neo-classical building, built as a series of galleries around a central auditorium used for lectures, small concerts, symposiums and poetry readings.

The two wings are connected by the Winter Garden with mosaic floors, tall palms, a fountain and topped by a dome made in copper and wrought iron.

The Henning Larsen Wing is a minimalistic infill, built in a former inner courtyard and affording access to the roof. Official meetings and banquets sometimes take place in the Glyptotek, such as the certification of Polio-free Europe, 21 June 2002.

== Collections ==
The Ny Carlsberg Glyptotek's collections comprise more than 10,000 works of art.

=== Antique collection ===
The Antique collection displays sculptures and other antiquities from the ancient cultures around the Mediterranean.

The extensive Greek, Roman and Etruscan Collection comprises marble statues, small terra cotta statues, reliefs, pottery and other artifacts. They include 950 sculptures and Etruscan antiquities that were purchased by German archaeologist Wolfgang Helbig, Theidoit Jacobsen's broker in Rome for 25 years.

The Egyptian Collection comprises more than 1,900 pieces, dating from 3000 BCE to the 1st century CE and representing both Ancient Egypt, the Middle Kingdom and the Roman Period. It was founded in 1882 when Carl Jacobsen made his first Egyptian acquisition, a Sarcophagus purchased from the Egyptian Museum in Cairo. Many of the objects in the collection were augmented when the Ny Carlsberg Foundation sponsored excavations in Egypt in the beginning of the 20th century led by the English Egyptologist W. M. F. Petrie. The holdings include several mummies, displayed in a crypt-like gallery below the normal galleries.

The Near Eastern Collection spans a period of 7150 years, the oldest artifact being from 6500 BCE and the youngest being from 650 CE, featuring such cultures as the Levant, Mesopotamia, Anatolia and Persia.

=== French Collection ===
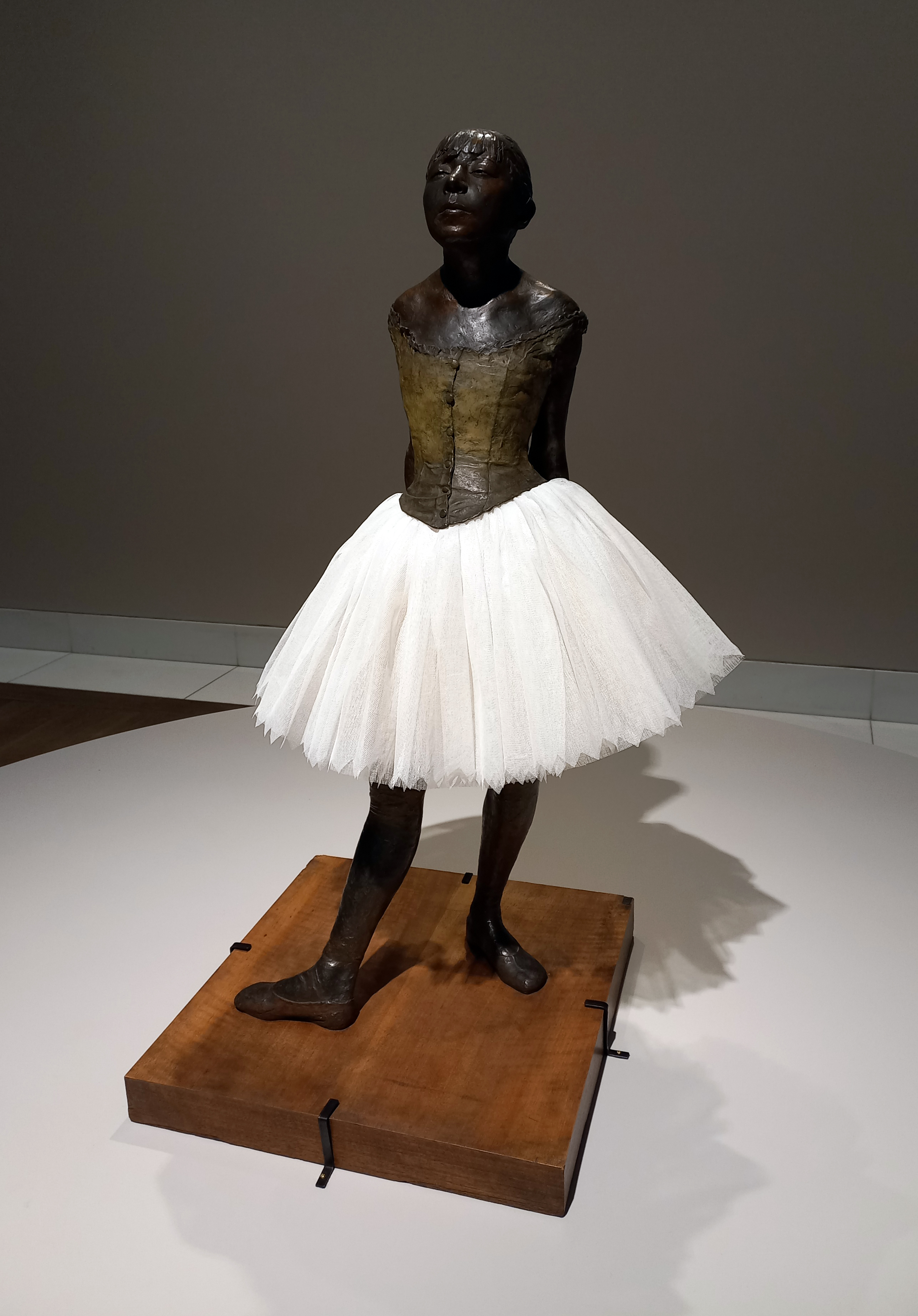
Edgar Degas: Little Dancer of Fourteen Years

The main focus of the French Collection is 19th-century French painting and sculpture. The painting collection contains works by such painters as David and Manet, as well as a large collection of Impressionist painters such as Monet, Cézanne and Bonnard. The single painter represented with most paintings is Paul Gauguin with more than 40 works. The museum also holds a large collection of French 19th-century sculpture by artists such as Carpeaux and Rodin, the Rodin collection being one of the largest in the world, as well as a complete collection of Degas' bronze sculptures.

=== Danish Collection ===
The Danish Collection contains a large collection of Danish Golden Age paintings by painters such as Eckersberg, Købke and Lundbye. It also contains the largest representation of Danish Golden Age Sculpture in the country.

=== European Collection ===
The European Collection comprises works from the 18th to the 20th century. Represented sculptors include Neoclassicists such as Canova, Sergel, Carstens, Flaxman, Rauch and Baily, as well as Modernists like Meunier, Klinger, Picasso and Giacometti.

The collection also comprises a small collection of Modern paintings of artists such as Arp, Ernst, Miró, Poliakoff and Gilioli.

== Auditorium ==
=== Concerts ===
The Auditorium is mainly used for classical concerts, including the Helge Jacobsen concert series. Helge Jacobsen Concerts have included the Austrian Hagen Quartet, the Russian violinist Alina Ibragimova, the French pianist Cédric Tiberghien, the Russian bariton Sergei Leiferkus, the French Ysaÿe Quartet and German tenor Jonas Kaufmann among others.

The Ny Carlsberg Glyptotek is in general noted for its good acoustics, both in the auditorium and in the surrounding long halls. The Auditorium has been used as a rehearsal room by the Early music vocal ensemble Musica Ficta, often within opening hours of the museum, occasionally adding music to the museum experience, and it has also regularly performed concerts, both in the Auditorium and the surrounding halls. Pioneer overtone singer David Hykes in the Ny Carlsberg Glyptotek in 1997.

Occasionally the Auditorium is also used for other musical genres, such as the Danish Klezmer group Mames Babegenush.

=== Other cultural events ===
The Auditorium is also used for other cultural events, such as poetry readings, lectures and debates.

== In popular culture ==
The museum is used as a location in the films Stjerneskud (1947), Fodboldpræsten (1951), Dorte (1951), Mød mig på Cassiopeia (1951), Bruden fra Dragstrup (1955) and Den kære familie (1962).

The building was the inspiration for the set design of the Valkyries' Rock in Kasper Holten's 2006 production of Wagner's Der Ring des Nibelungen at the Copenhagen Opera House.

== Gallery ==
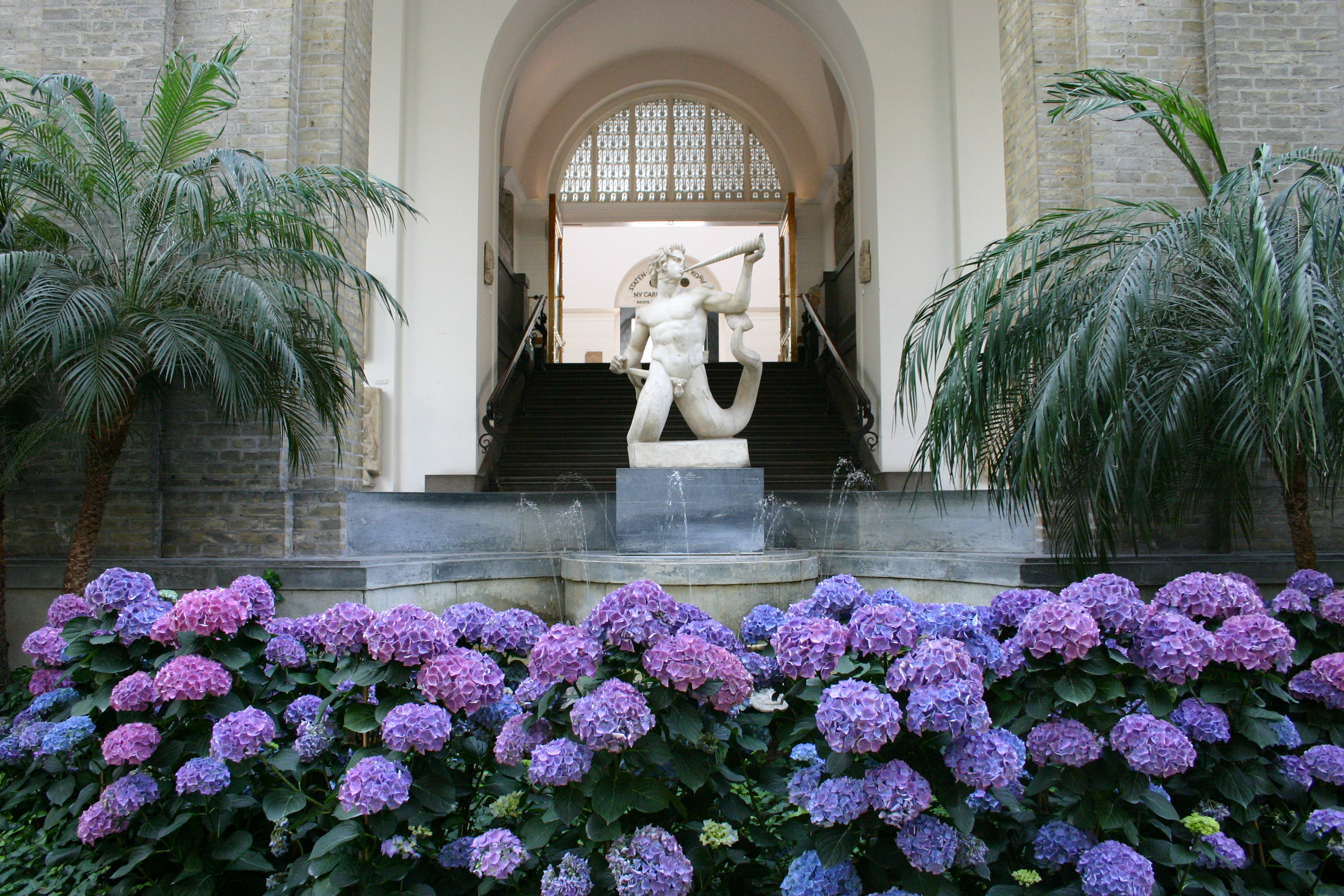
Winter garden, Ny Carlsberg Glyptotek

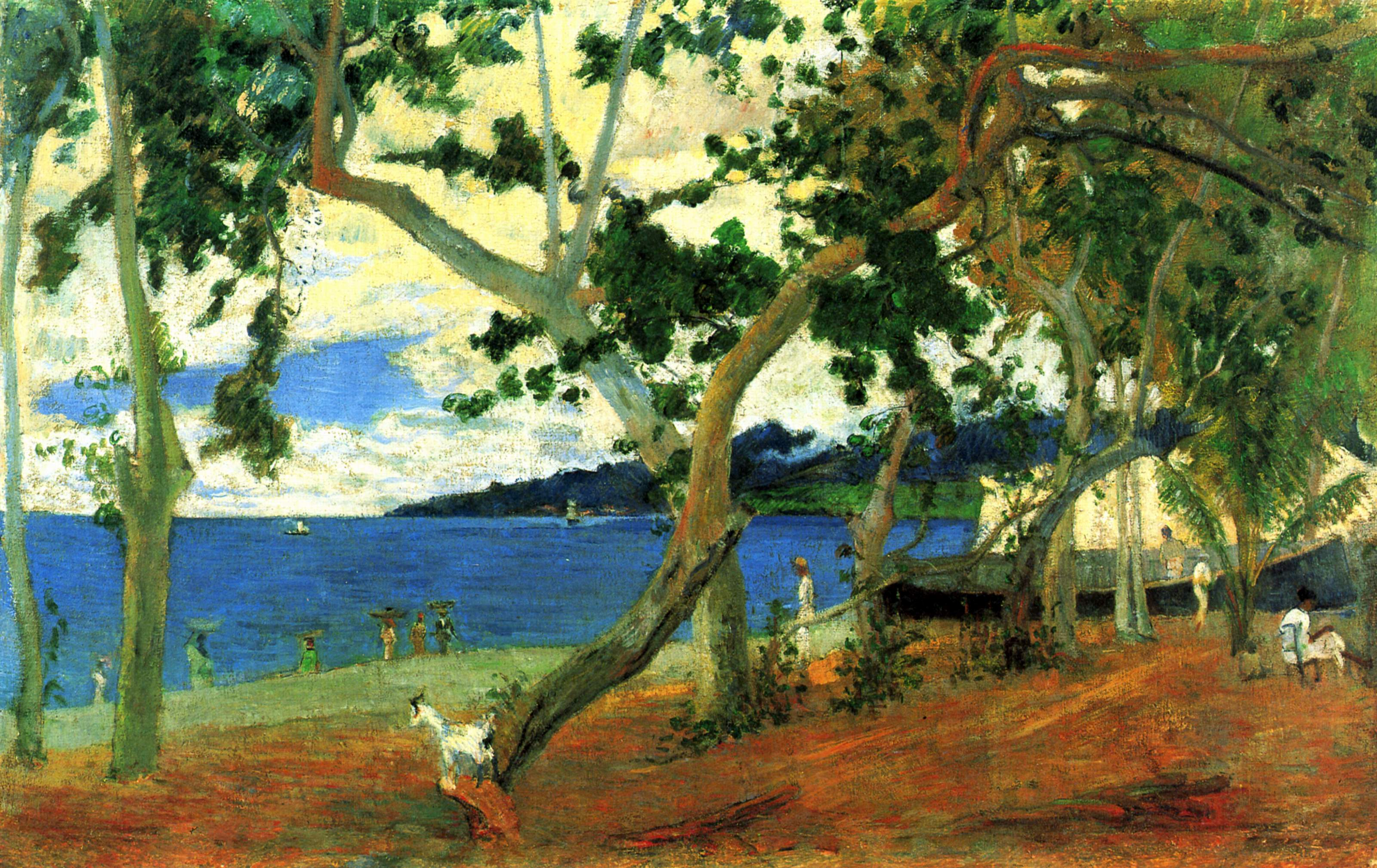
Paul Gauguin: Bord de mer I (Seaside I)

Part of the Ny Carlsberg Glyptotek garden

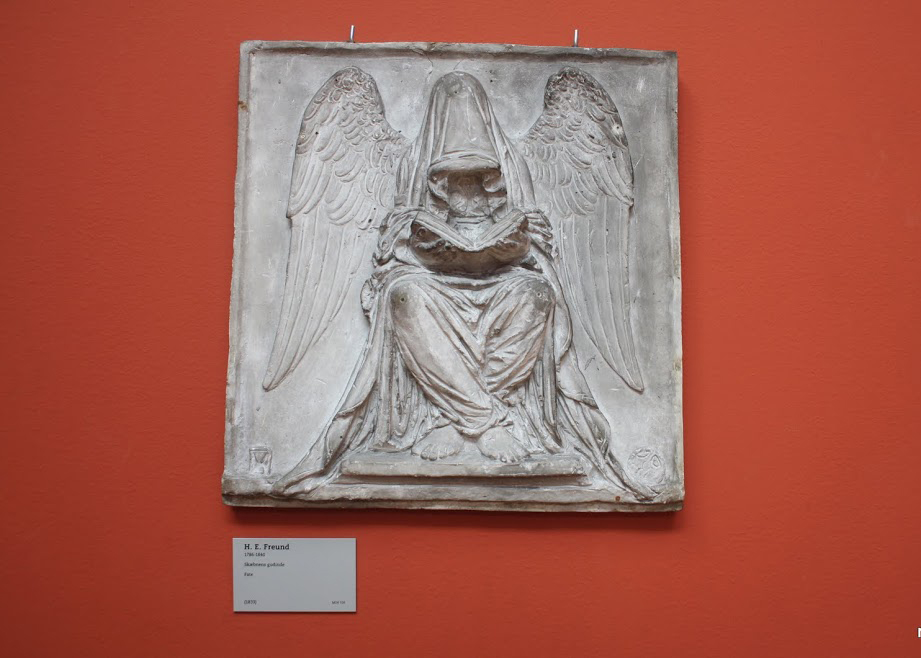
Fate
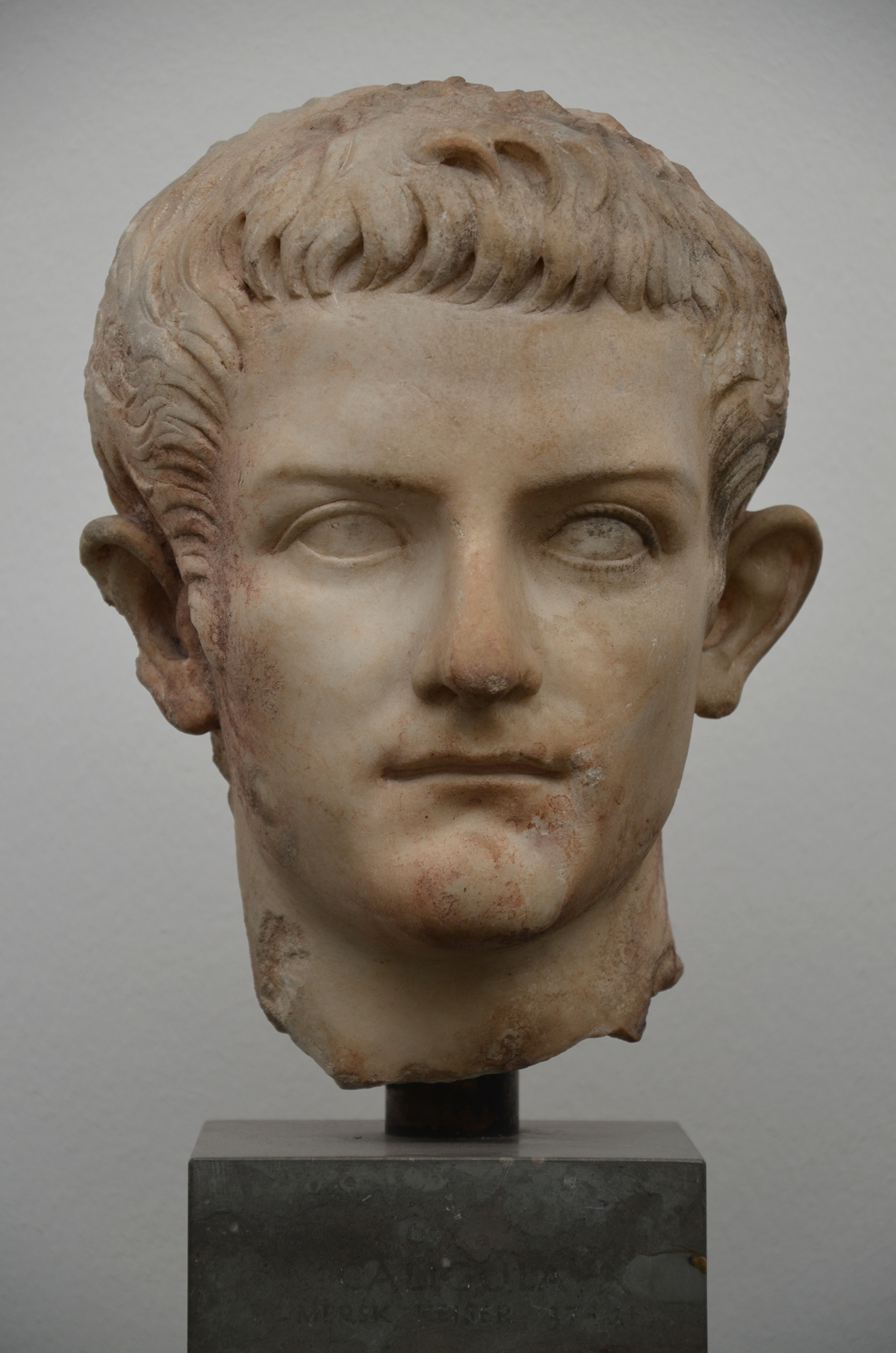
Portrait of Caligula (with traces of polychromy), AD 37-41

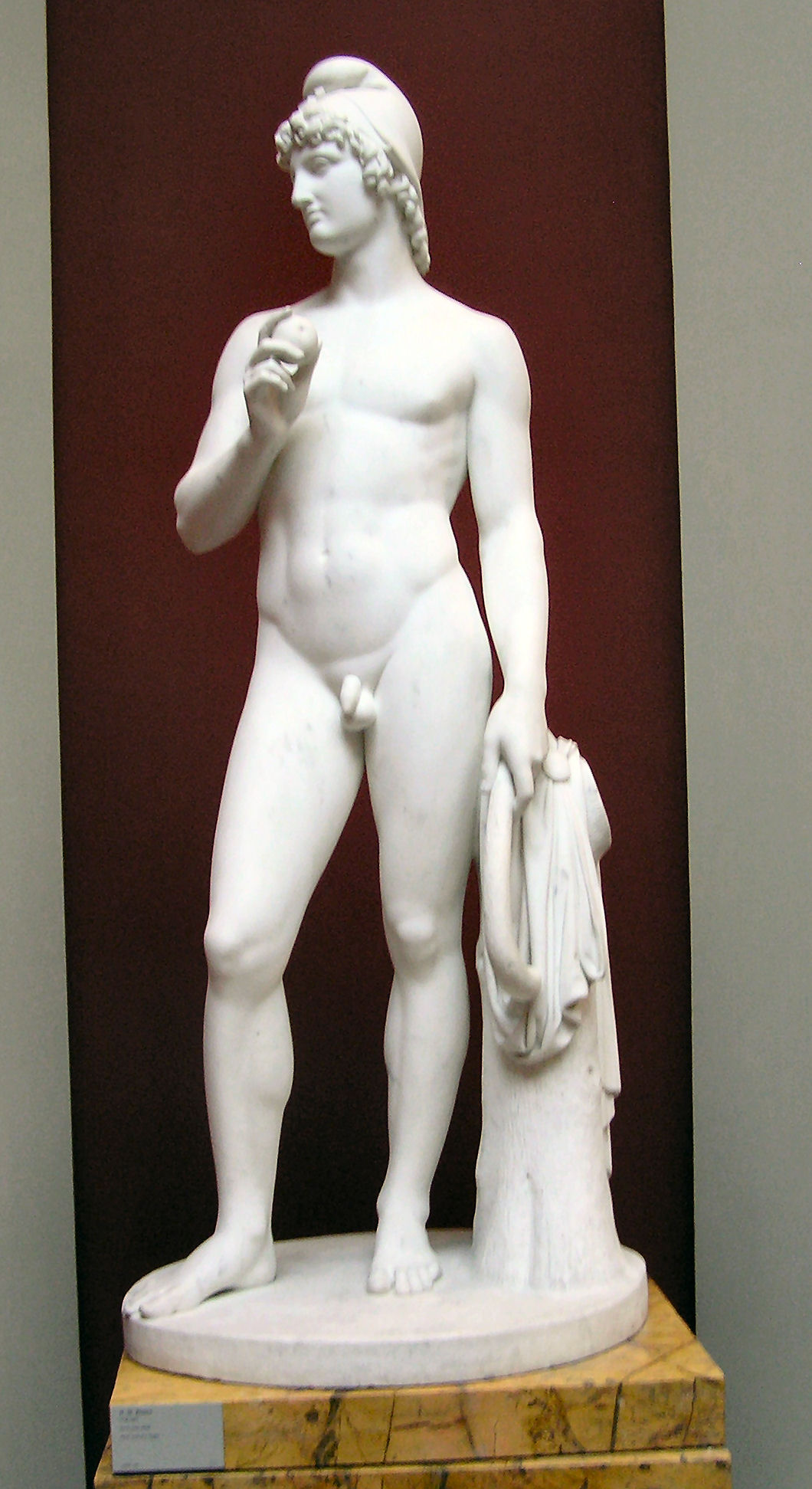
Herman Wilhelm Bissen:
Prince Paris with apple

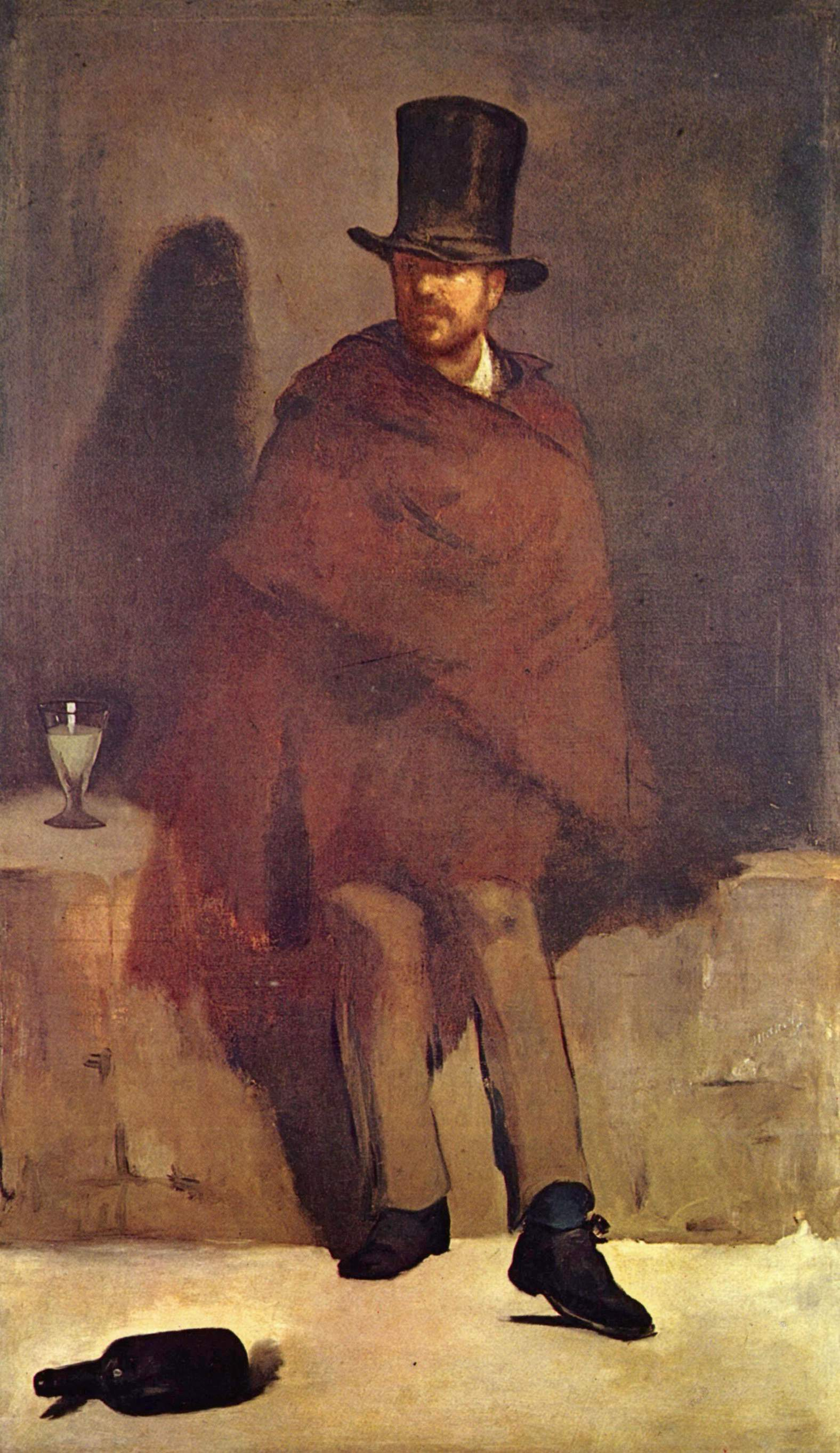
Édouard Manet:
The Absinth Drinker

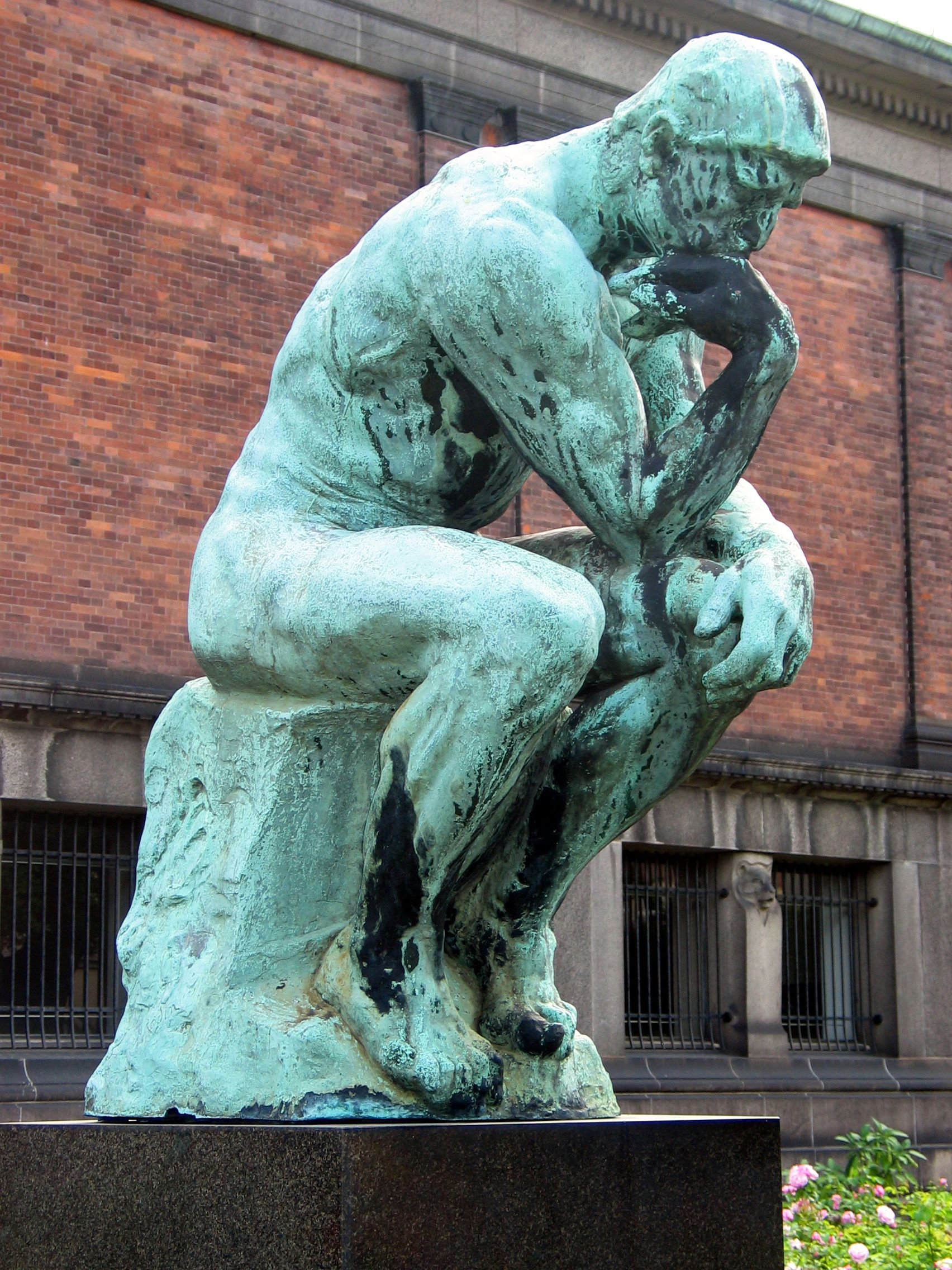
Auguste Rodin:
The Thinker

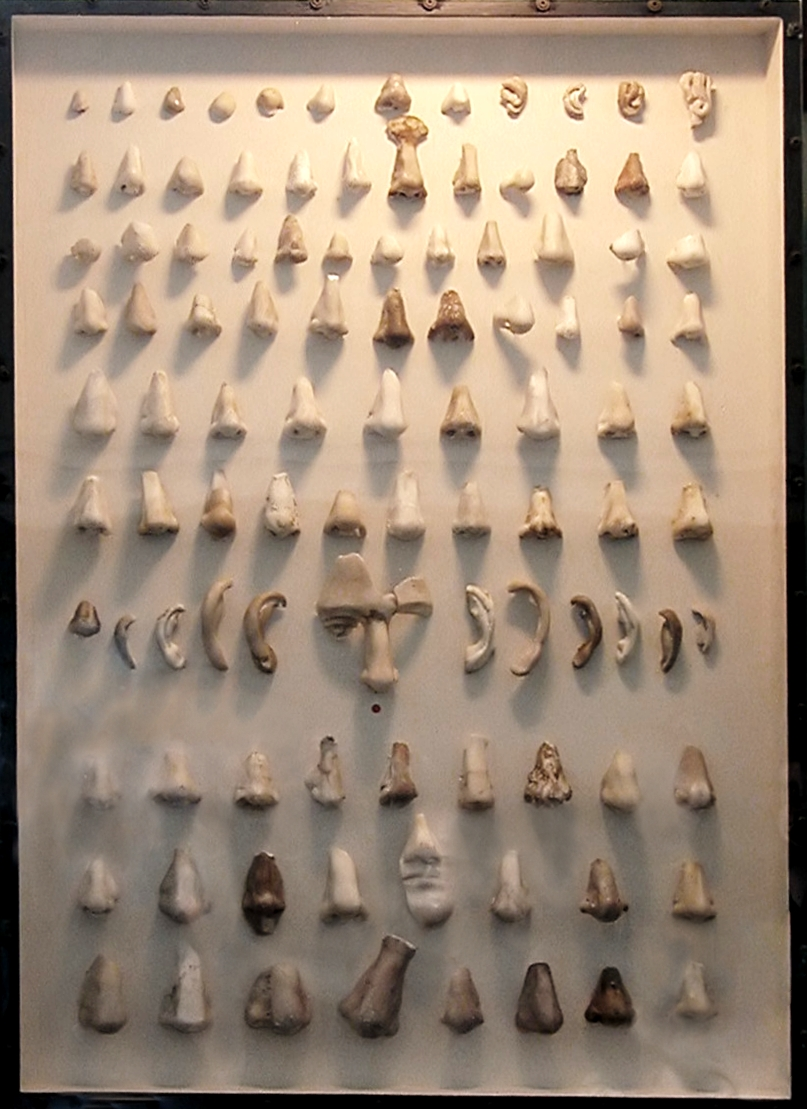
Nasothek display of noses used for restoration

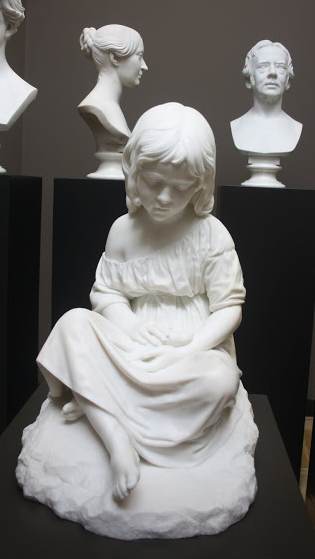
Girl with bird

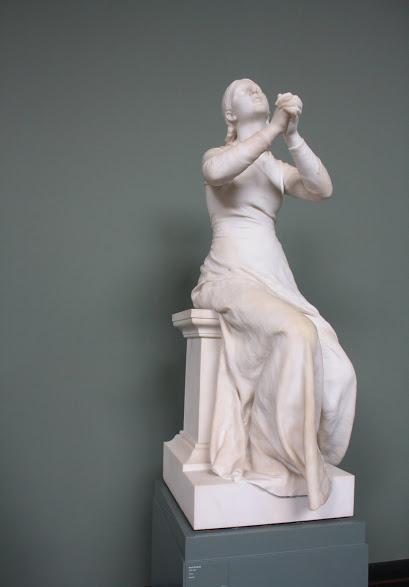
Fidelity

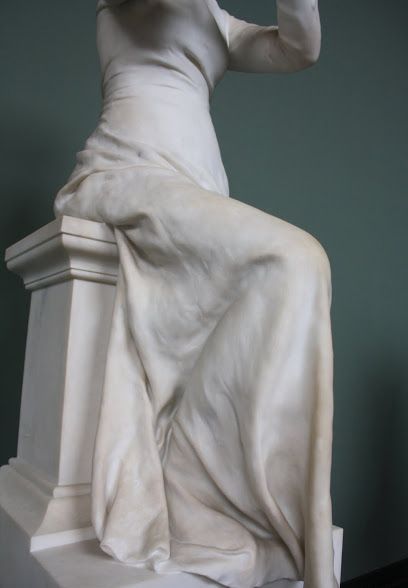
Fidelity (close-up)

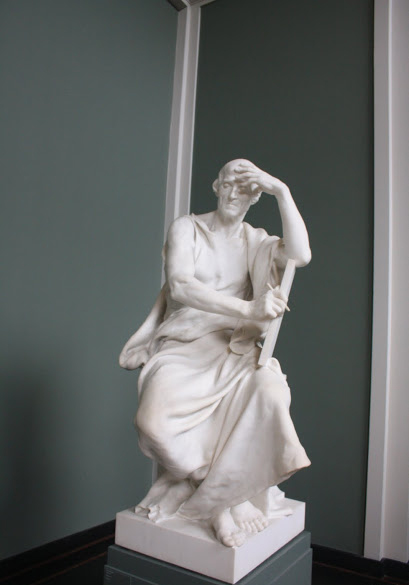
Prudence

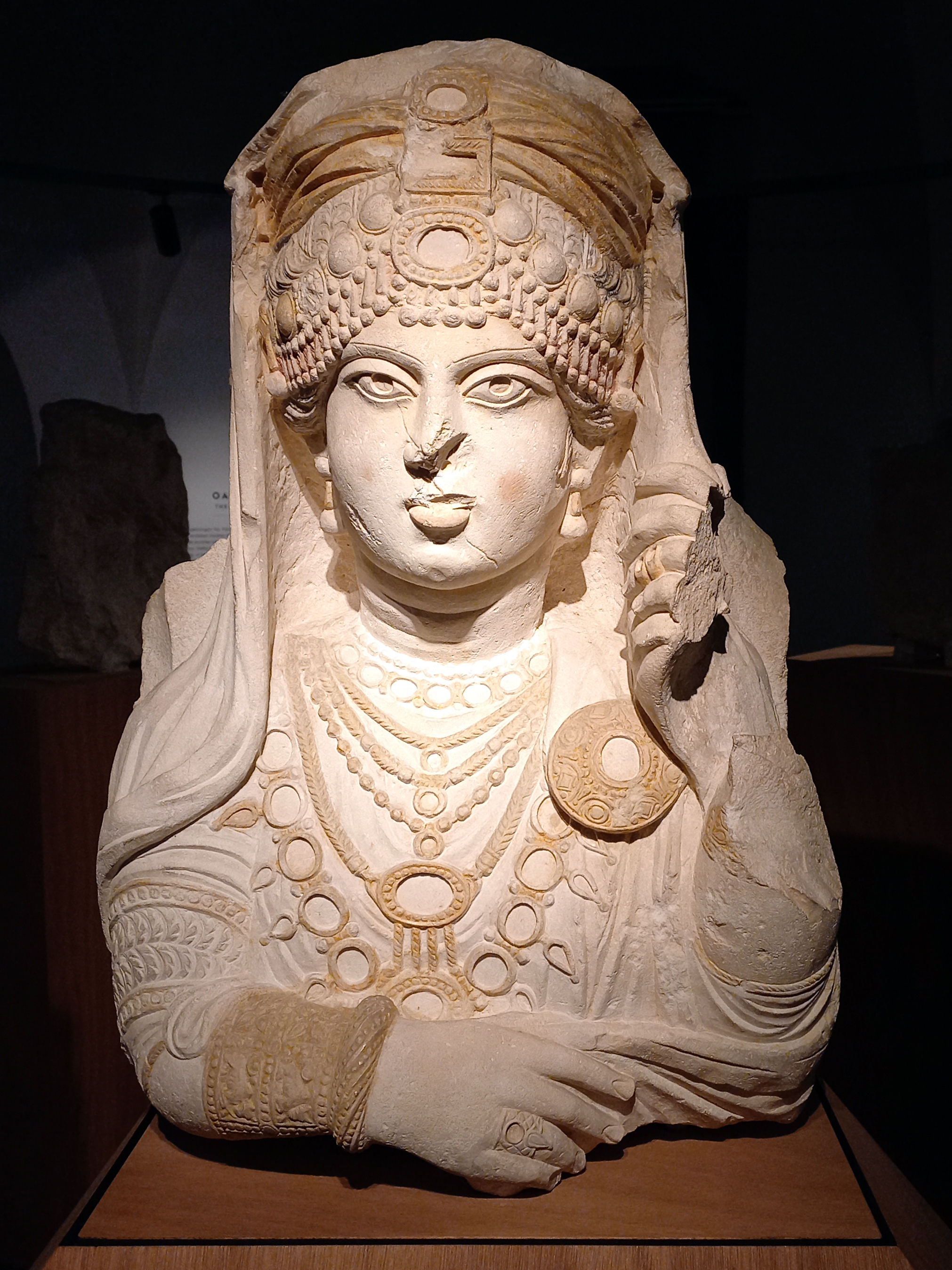
Beauty of Palmyra

== See also ==
- Carlsberg Foundation
- The Carlsberg District
- H. C. Andersens Boulevard
- Paul Dubois (sculptor)
- Laurentian Sow (sculpture)
