= Laurentian Sow =

Ancient Roman Marble sculpture of the Ny Carlsberg Glyptotek

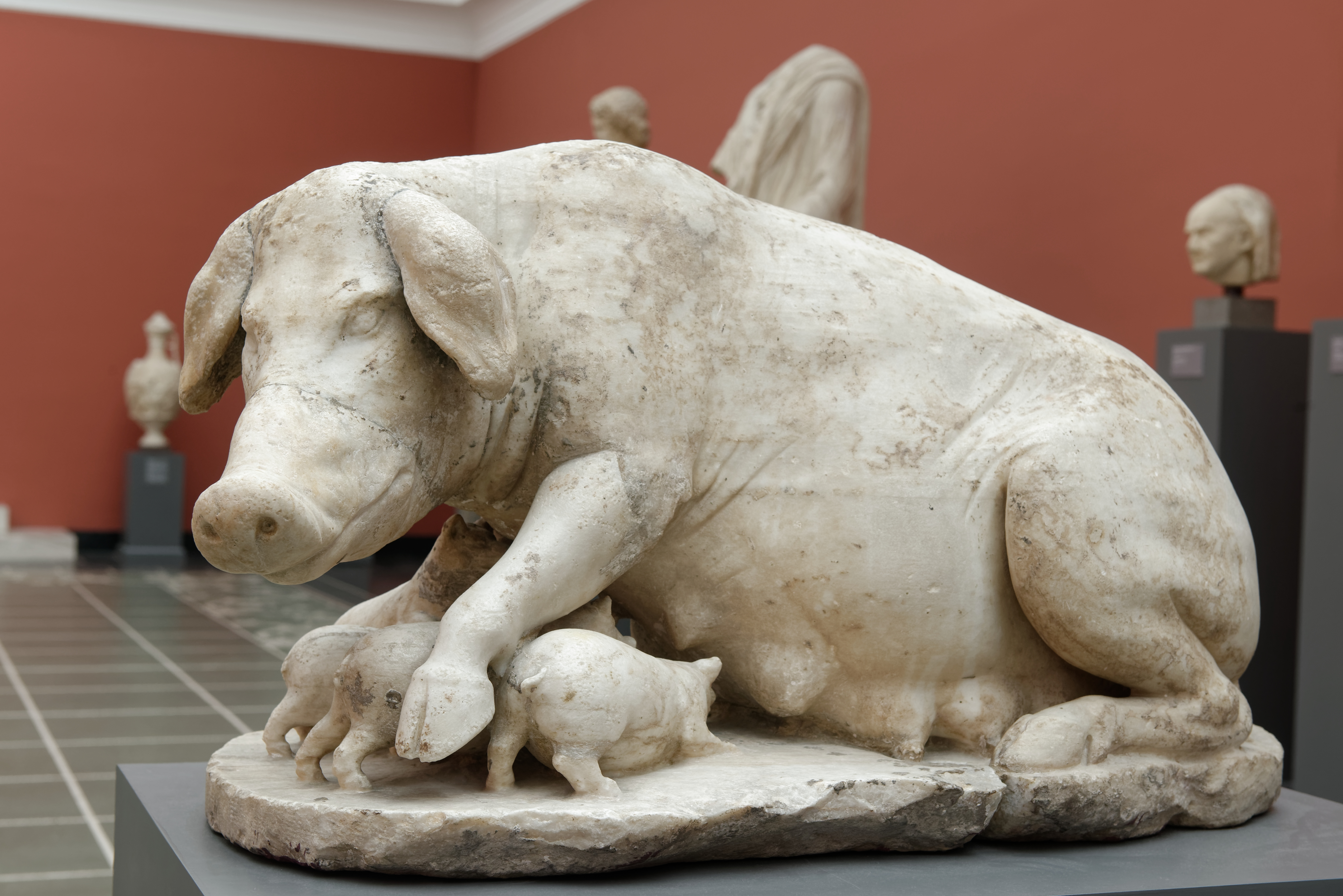
- Artist: Unknown
- Year: 1839 (marble, 1959)
- Type: Marble
- Dimensions: 46 cm × 75 cm (18 in × 30 in)
- Location: Ny Carlsberg Glyptotek; Copenhagen

The Laurentian Sow is a 1st or 2nd century AD Roman marble sculpture of a sow with feeding suckling pigs, currently on display in the Ny Carlsberg Glyptotek in Copenhagen, Denmark.

== Iconography ==
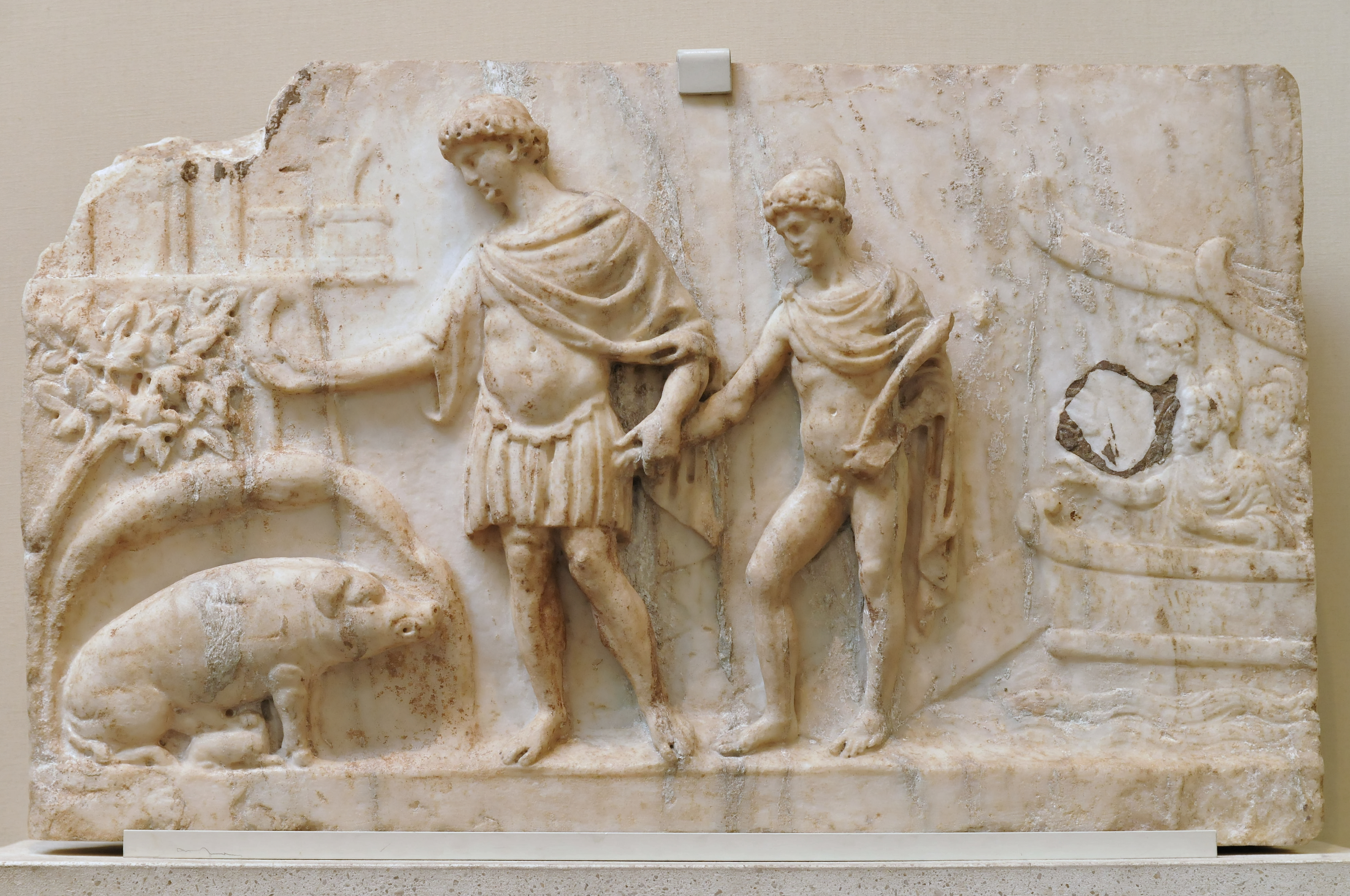
The Laurentian Sow seen in a relief from the same period.

The sculpture relates to the story of Aeneas according to a prophecy of a priest of Apollo. Æneas lands on the shores of Old Latium with his son Ascanius behind him; on the left, a sow tells him where to found his city.

== History ==
The sculpture was acquired by the Ny Carlsberg Glyptotek on 1 January 1909.
