= Marie Scheublé =

French classical violinist (born 1974)

Marie Scheublé (born in 1974) is a French classical violinist.

== Biography ==
Scheublé began her violin studies at the age of 5, then became a student of Gérard Poulet at the age of 9. She won First Prize in chamber music at the age of 16, followed by First Prize in violin at the Conservatoire de Paris. She followed the masterclasses of Zakhar Bron, Franco Gulli, Yehudi Menuhin, Giorgio Ferrari. At 18, she won the First Prize in the Yehudi Menuhin International Competition in front of a jury composed of Lord Menuhin, Gidon Kremer, Vladimir Spivakov, Zakhar Bron, Bruno Monsaingeon and Maurizio Fuks.

She is known for her interpretations of the post-romantic repertoire, in particular for her interpretation of Sibelius' Violin Concerto Op. 47. Her recording of the two Shostakovich violin concertos was praised by the critic of Le Monde intensity and the breathtaking beauty of Scheublé's sonorities.

She appears in the documentary Une leçon particulière avec Gérard Poulet (directed by Catherine Zins in 1991), performing the same concerto.

== Selected discography ==
- 1996: Sibelius by Marie Scheublé: violin concerto Op. 47, orchestral legend no. 1 Op. 22, Piece for violin and orchestra Op. 77 (Arion);
- 1995: Shostakovitch: concertos for violin n°1 and 2 (Arion).
