= Ysaÿe Quartet (1984) =

The Ysaÿe Quartet (Quatuor Ysaÿe) was a French string quartet that was founded in 1984 by students at the Conservatoire de Paris named after the original Ysaÿe Quartet. It ended its existence in January 2014.

Its members as of the time they disbanded were:

- Guillaume Sutre (violin) (previously Christophe Giovaninetti)
- Luc-Marie Aguera (violin) (previously Romano Tommasini)
- Miguel da Silva (viola)
- Yovan Markovitch (cello) (previously Carlos Dourthe, then Michel Poulet, then Marc Coppey, then François Salque)

The ensemble undertook studies with members of the Amadeus Quartet in Cologne from 1986 to 1989. It won prizes at competitions in Trapani (2nd), Portsmouth (2nd) and Evian (1st). The quartet won admiration for its recordings of the quartets of Debussy and Ravel, and, with pianist Pascal Rogé, of the quintets of Fauré. They also performed a set of Mozart's "Haydn" Quartets for the Decca label to much acclaim. They taught at CNR in Paris and gave masterclasses in the mountain city of Flaine in France.
