= Guillaume Sutre =

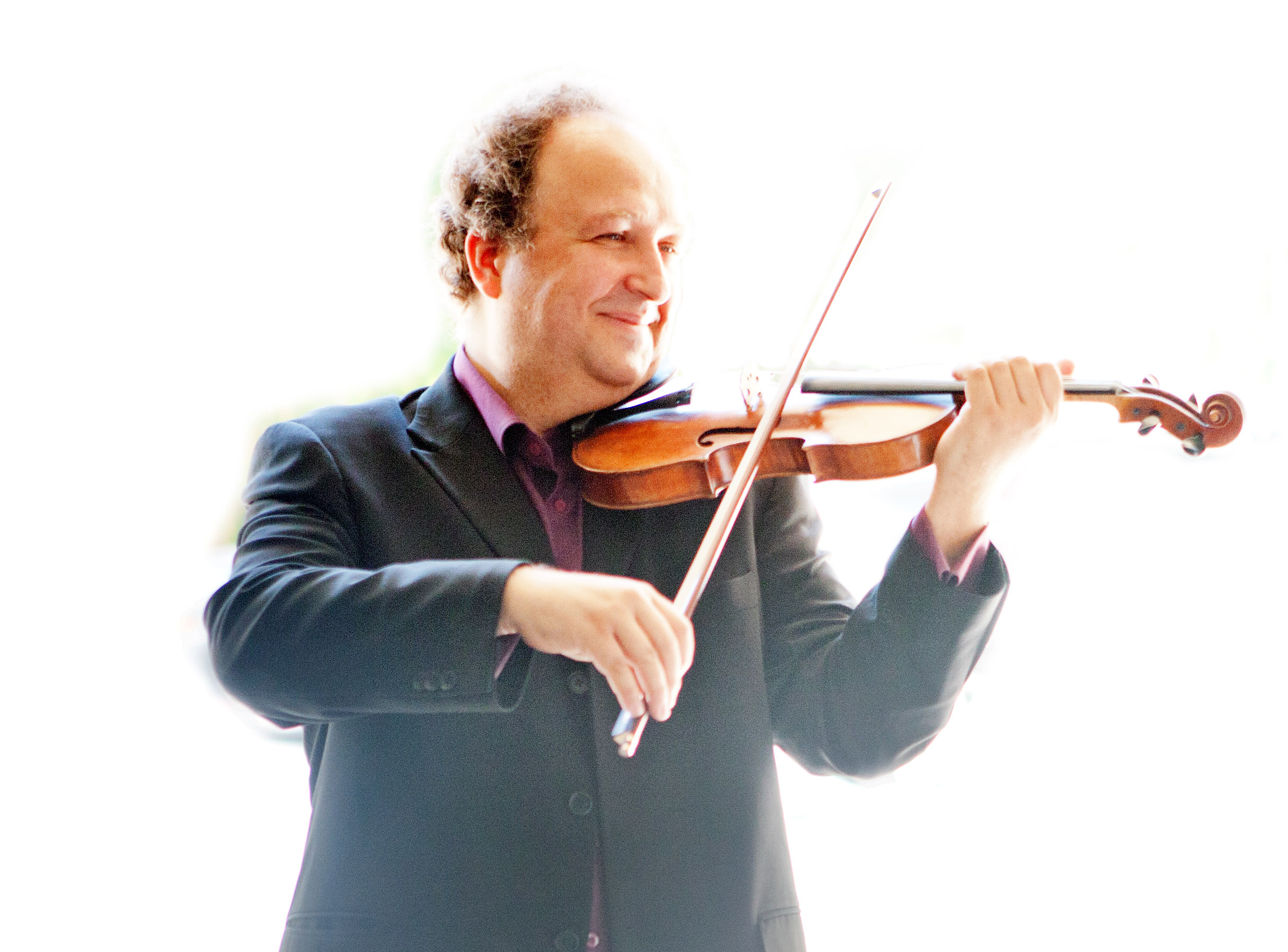
Guillaume Sutre in 2014.

Guillaume Sutre (born in 1969) is a French classical violinist.

== Ensembles ==
- 1987–1995: Trio Wanderer, founding member
- 1995–2014: Ysaÿe Quartet, 1st violin
- 1991– : Duo Sutre-Kim, violin and harp

== Teaching ==
- 1995–2008: Conservatoire à rayonnement régional de Paris (C.R.R.), Chamber music teacher, Ysaÿe Quartet's class
- 2008–2017: University of California, Los Angeles (UCLA), Professor of violin and chamber music, director of chamber music
- Since 2019: Tianjin Juilliard School, Professor of violin and chamber music

== Discography ==
- 1990: Dvořák and Shostakovich, Trios with Piano Op. 90 "Dumky" & Op. 67, Trio Wanderer (Festival d'Auvers-sur-Oise)
- 1993: Chausson's Trio with Piano Op. 3, Trio Wanderer (K617)
- 1995: Mendelssohn, Trios with Piano Op. 49 & 66, Trio Wanderer (Sony Classical)
- 1996: Britten and Poulenc, François Leleux, oboe; G. Sutre, M. da Silva, Marc Coppey, cello; Emmanuel Strosser, piano (Harmonia Mundi)
- 1997: Fauré, Quartets and Quintets with piano, Ysaÿe Quartet; Pascal Rogé, piano (2CDs Decca)
- 2000: Boucourechliev's String quartets, Ysaÿe Quartet (Æon)
- 2002: J. Haydn & W-A. Mozart: Duos for Violin & Viola, G. Sutre & M. da Silva (2CD Transart Live)
- 2002: M. Bruch: Double Concerto in E minor Op. 88 - 8 Pieces Op. 83, G. Sutre, M. da Silva, B. Fontaine, Stefan Sanderling, Orchestre de Bretagne (Transart Live)
- 2003: J. Haydn: 3 String Quartets Op. 54, Ysaÿe Quartet (Ysaye Records)
- 2004: R. Schumann: 3 String Quartets Op. 41, Ysaÿe Quartet (Ysaye Records)
- 2004: W-A. Mozart: Quintet with clarinet K. 581, Trio des Quilles K. 498, Adagio & Fugue K. 546, Michel Portal, clarinet; Jean-Claude Pennetier, piano; Ysaÿe Quartet (Ysaye Records)
- 2005: L-V. Beethoven: Rare Chamber Music, Ysaÿe Quartet, Shuli Waterman (Ysaye Records)
- 2005: Louise Farrenc: Chamber music, G. Sutre, Brigitte Engerer, M. da Silva, F. Salque, F. Leleux, R. Guyot, G. Audin, P. Bernold, A. Cazalet, V. Pasquier, J-F. Neuburger (Naïve Live)
- 2005: Albéric Magnard & G. Fauré: String quartets, Ysaÿe Quartet (Ysaye Records)
- 2006: W-A. Mozart's Quartets with piano, Jean-Claude Pennetier, Ysaÿe Quartet (Ysaye Records)
- 2006: C. Debussy, I. Stravinsky & G. Fauré, Ysaÿe Quartet (Wigmore Hall Live)
- 2007: J. Haydn's The Seven Last Words of Christ Op. 51, Ysaÿe Quartet, Michel Serres (Ysaye Records)
- 2007: C. Franck: String Quartet, Quintet with Piano, Sonata for Piano and Violin, Pascal Rogé, Ysaÿe Quartet (Ysaye Records)
- 2008: Paul Chihara's Quintet with Piano La Foce, Pascal Rogé, Ysaÿe Quartet (Bridge)
- 2012: L-V Beethoven: String Quartets Op. 18 No. 3, Op. 74 & Op. 135 | Ysaÿe Quartet (Ysaye Records)
- 2012: J. Brahms & A. Schoenberg: String Quartets No. 3 Op. 67 & Verklärte Nacht sextet, I. Charisius, V. Erben (Ysaye Records)
- 2015: Pensées Intimes, Musicians and the Great War, Sonatas for Violin & Piano, G. Sutre, S. Vanhauwaert (Hortus)
- 2015: Joseph Wölfl: The Paris Years (1801-1805), G. Sutre, KH. Kim-Sutre, S. Vanhauwaert (Sonarti)
- 2016: R. Kreutzer & NC. Bochsa: 6 Nocturnes Concertants, Sutre-Kim Duo (Sonarti)
- 2017: Parfums d’Amour, 25th Anniversary of the Sutre-Kim Duo, Sutre-Kim Duo (Sonarti)

== Instruments ==
- 1995–1999 : Violin by Antonio & Hieronymous Amati.
- 1999–2003 : Violin by Carlo Tononi (Venice 1727)
- 2003–2008 : Violin by Giovanni Battista Guadagnini (Parma 1770)
- 2008– : Violin by Gregorio Antoniazzi (Colle 1738)
