= Nasothek =

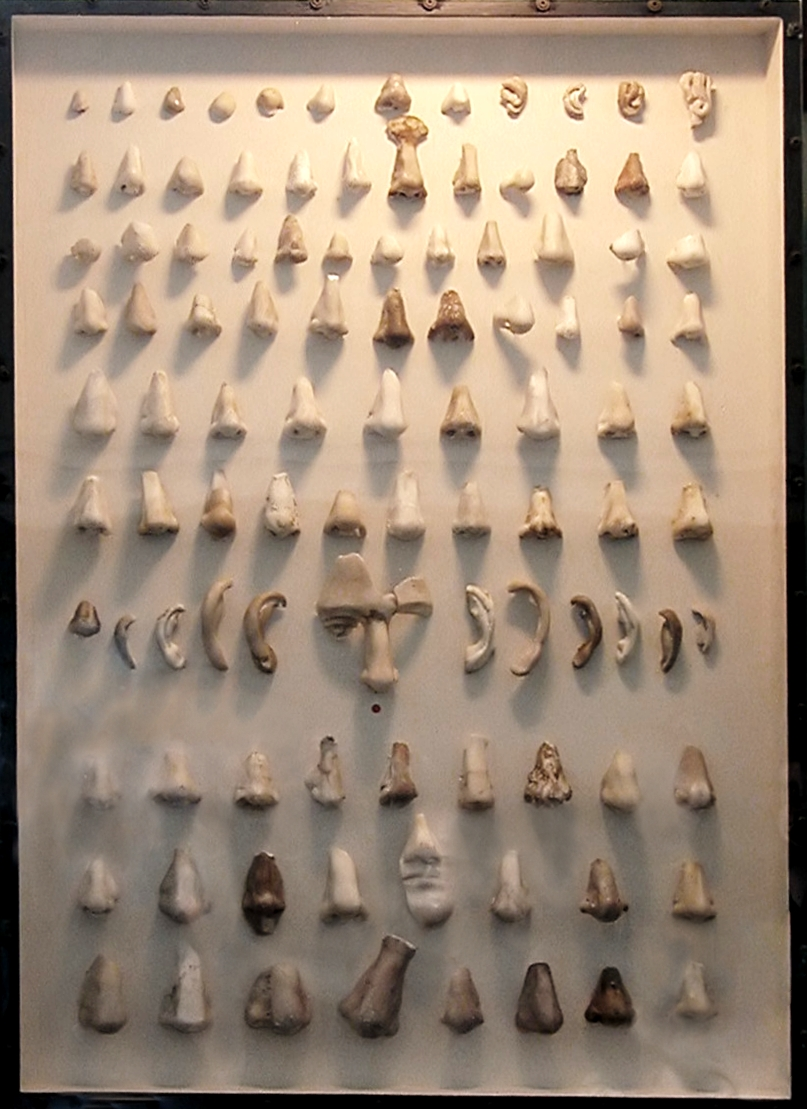
Nasothek displaying marble body parts once used to "repair" antique statuary.

A nasothek (from the Latin nasus "nose" and Greek θήκη "container") is a collection of sculpted noses.

== Carlsberg display of restoration noses ==
The Ny Carlsberg Glyptotek museum in Copenhagen has a nasothek collection that displays restored noses that were removed from portrait busts and statues after changes in the museum's art restoration policies. The noses, some made of marble and others of plaster, were all originally exhibited on the Greek and Roman statues in the glyptotek itself.

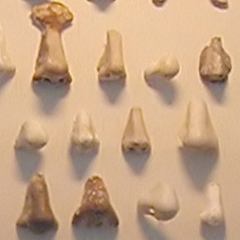
Detail: A closer look at the Copenhagen Nasothek display shows wide variety in surface textures and style.

The white marble favored by Classical sculptors is easily broken, and many antique statues have been damaged since their creation by accidents, iconoclasm, or vandalism. During the 19th century, it was common practice for museums to exhibit such marble sculptures in a "restored" state, with damaged parts repaired or reconstructed to make the statue look as much as possible as it did when it was first created. The noses of antique statues are especially likely to be damaged or missing, so many Greek or Roman statues acquired new noses during this era. Modern exhibition practice may differ from museum to museum. The minimalist approach prescribes removing such 19th-century additions in the interest of authenticity, as has been done in Copenhagen.

The Ny Carlsberg museum, which has an extensive collection of Greek and Roman marble statues, participated both in 19th-century restoration and in 20th-century "de-restoration." As a result, many Roman portrait heads are now noseless again, with their restored noses removed to the museum's nasothek.

The museum display explains its contents in both Danish and English. The English description says, "The word nasothek means a collection of noses, in analogy with discotheque, a collection of records." The Danish explanation compares "nasotek" (Danish equivalent of "nasothek") to "bibliotek", a collection of books.

== Lund display of plaster casts of noses ==
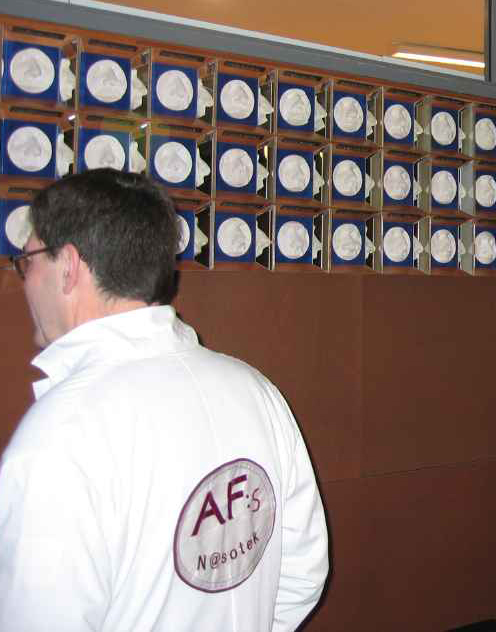
Display of plaster casts of noses at Lund University

The Nasoteket at Lund University in Sweden consists of a display of more than 100 plaster casts of noses, including a cast of the metal prosthetic nose of Tycho Brahe.
