= Marc Coppey =

French cellist

Marc Coppey (born 1969 in Strasbourg) is a French contemporary classical cellist.

== Biography ==
In 1988 at the age of 18, Marc Coppey won the two highest prizes of the International Johann Sebastian Bach Competition: the first prize and the special prize for best Bach performance. He was then noticed by Yehudi Menuhin.

He made his public performance debuts in Moscow and in Paris playing the Tchaikovsky Piano Trio with Menuhin and Viktoria Postnikova, on the occasion of a concert filmed by Bruno Monsaingeon. Rostropovich invited him to the Evian Festival and, from then on, his soloist career unfolded under the direction of Emmanuel Krivine, Rafael Frühbeck de Burgos, Michel Plasson, Jean-Claude Casadesus, Theodor Guschlbauer, John Nelson, Raymond Leppard, Erich Bergel, Philippe Bender, Alan Gilbert, Lionel Bringuier, Paul McCreesh, Yutaka Sado, Kirill Karabits and Asher Fisch.

Coppey is particularly known for his long-standing chamber music partnership with Russian pianist Peter Laul. The two musicians have collaborated on numerous recording projects and concert performances, specializing in the repertoire of Russian and European cello sonatas.

In July 2005, Coppey and Laul recorded a groundbreaking double album titled Russian Sonatas for Cello and Piano featuring works by Sergei Rachmaninov, Sergei Prokofiev, Dmitri Shostakovich, and Alfred Schnittke. This recording was notable as the first complete recording to unite all four major Russian cello-piano sonatas on a single release. The album was released on the Aeon label and recorded in Toulouse. Critics noted Laul's "sovereign" piano accompaniment, particularly praising his contributions to the technically demanding passages in Shostakovich's sonata.

In 2017, Coppey and Laul performed live recordings of Beethoven's complete works for cello and piano at the Small Hall of the St. Petersburg Philharmonia in Russia, which was released on the Audite label. The performance took place over two consecutive nights in the same historic venue where premieres of Haydn's Creation (1802) and Beethoven's Missa Solemnis (1824) had taken place. Coppey noted in an interview that he and Laul had been performing this sonata cycle together for over 20 years, bringing to the live recording a mature understanding of Beethoven's compositional voice.
