= Kaulbach =

Kaulbach or von Kaulbach is a German surname. Notable people with the surname include:

- Anna van Gogh-Kaulbach, Dutch writer and translator
- Bruno Franz Kaulbach (1880–1963), Austrian Lawyer
- Charles Edwin Kaulbach (1834–1907), Canadian merchant, ship owner and political figure
- Frida von Kaulbach (1871–1948), Dutch violinist
- Friedrich Kaulbach (1822–1903), German painter
  - Antonie Kaulbach, German painter, daughter of Friedrich Kaulbach
  - Anton Kaulbach (1864–1934), German painter, son of Friedrich Kaulbach
  - Friedrich August von Kaulbach (1850–1920), German painter, son of Friedrich Kaulbach
    - Henriette Agnete Kitty von Kaulbach, German-Dutch painter
  - Isidore Kaulbach, German writer
- Wilhelm von Kaulbach (1804–1874), German painter
  - Hermann von Kaulbach (1846–1909), German painter, son of Wilhelm von Kolbach

== See also ==
- Kaulback, a similar surname
- Kreimbach-Kaulbach, municipality in Rhineland-Palatinate
- 5491 Kaulbach, an asteroid.
