= Julius Eichberg =

German-born composer (1824–1893)

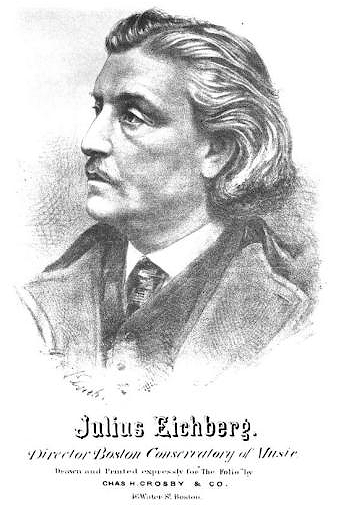
Portrait of Eichberg, c. 1870s

Julius Eichberg (13 June 1824 – 19 January 1893) was a German-born composer, musical director and educator who worked mostly in Boston, Massachusetts.

== Biography ==
Julius Eichberg was born in Düsseldorf, Germany to a Jewish family. His first musical instruction came from his father whose pupil was an acceptable violin player by his seventh year. He had further early violin instruction with F. W. Eichler, Julius Rietz, and with Johannes Fröhlich at the Musical Academy of Würzburg. Upon the recommendation of Felix Mendelssohn, he entered the Brussels Conservatoire at the age of nineteen, where he took first prizes for violin playing and composition. He was a pupil of Belgian composer Charles Auguste de Bériot, studied composition under François-Joseph Fétis, and studied violin under Lambert Joseph Meerts.

For eleven years he occupied the post of professor in the Conservatoire of Geneva, in Switzerland, and directed an opera troupe.

In 1857, he went to the United States, staying two years in New York City and then proceeding to Boston, Massachusetts, where he became the chef d'orchestre at the Boston Museum, directing the Boston Museum Concerts until 1866. These concerts were a major fixture in the Boston musical scene, showcasing light and popular music as well as choral and orchestral works. It afforded Eichberg an opportunity to play his own compositions, including his operettas A Night in Rome and Rose of Tyrol. His most successful work, The Doctor of Alcantara, was premiered at the Boston Museum at the April 7, 1862 concert, and ran throughout the country for 20 years. The piece was, according to Kurt Gänzl, the "first American musical".

He formed a trio with cellist August Kreissmann and pianist Hugo Leonhard, who played in a series of "Musical Soirées" in Boston in the early 1860s. Gottschalk accompanied Eichberg in a series of concerts in Boston in 1862.

In 1867 he founded and directed the Boston Conservatory of Music, and in the same year he was elected superintendent of music in the Boston Public Schools, which position he long held. He also founded the Eichberg Violin School; Marietta Sherman Raymond and Arma Senkrah were students. He later composed symphonies and piano pieces. Eichberg died in Boston on January 19, 1893; his obituary gives January 18. He was interred at Mount Auburn cemetery, the first burial there of an identifiable Jew.

== Family ==
He married Sophie Mertens, and they had one child, Annie Philippine Eichberg, who was born in Geneva, Switzerland, c. 1856. Her second husband was the English publisher John Lane.

== Works ==
Eichberg published several educational works on music. As a composer he is particularly known for his three operettas, The Rose of Tyrol (1865), The Two Cadis (1868) and A Night in Rome, and the opera The Doctor of Alcantara (1862) to an English libretto by Benjamin Edward Woolf.
