= Rosario Guerrero =

Spanish dancer (c. 1880 – 1960s)

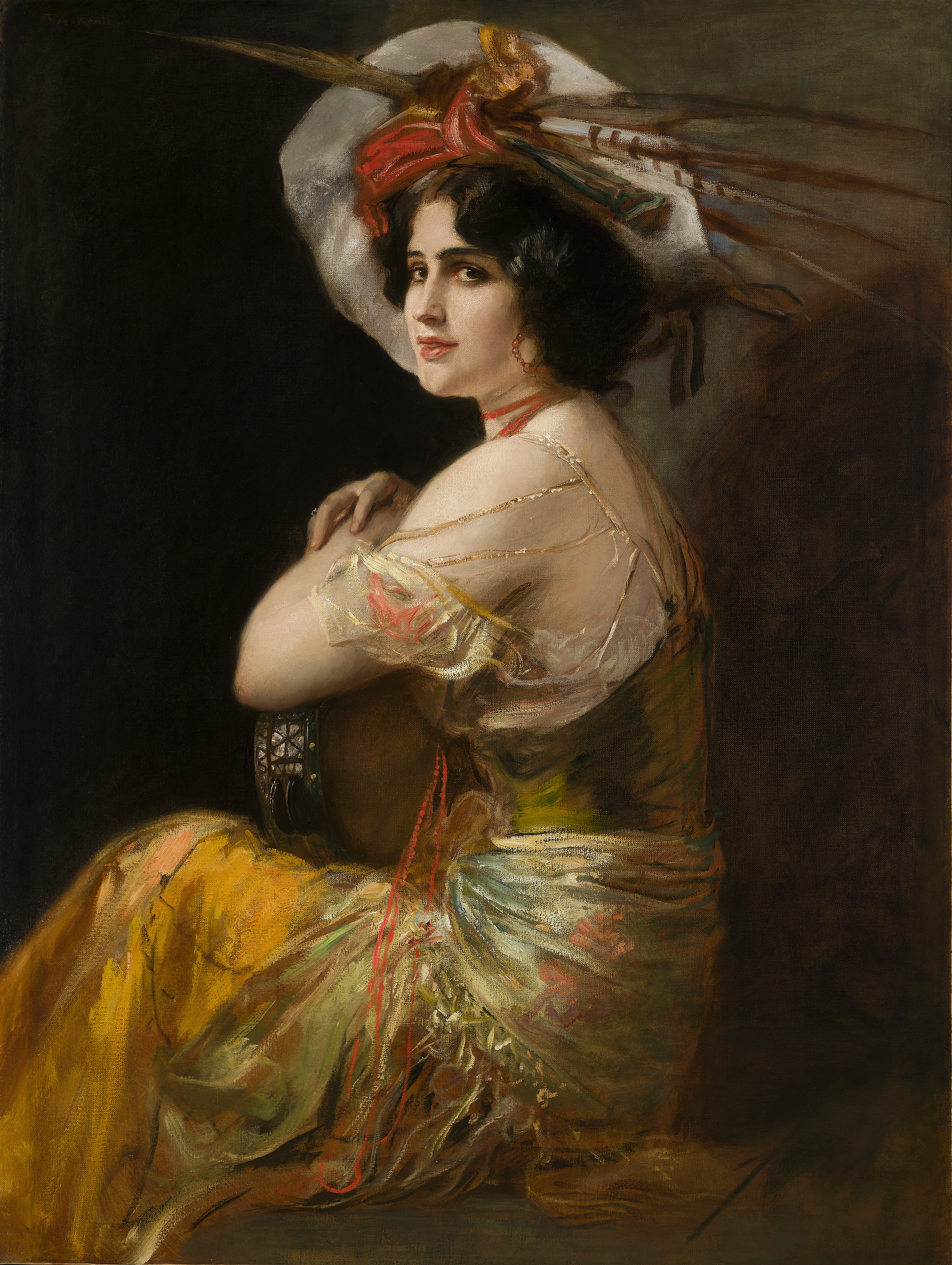
- Friedrich August von Kaulbach, "Rosario Guerrero as Carmen" (circa 1908)
- Born: Rosario Fernández Guerrero about 1880; Spain
- Died: 1960s (aged c. 80); Madrid
- Other names: La Bella Guerrero, Rose Guerrero
- Occupation: dancer

Rosario Fernández Guerrero (born about 1880 – died 1960s) was a Spanish dancer and pantomimist with an international career. Although she was not a singer, she is most often associated with the role of Carmen.

== Early life ==
Guerrero was born in Spain; some sources give Madrid as the city, while she recalled a childhood in Seville.

== Career ==
Guerrero danced in Paris and London as a young woman. She danced a ballet version of Carmen in 1903 in London at the Alhambra Theatre. "I reveled in it," she told an interviewer, "I felt that I was Carmen, and do you know, I verily believe that my Don José was now and again really afraid of me." She danced in New York in 1903 and 1904, appearing in The Rose and the Dagger and The Red Feather. In 1905, she was in London again, in a pantomime called The Nightmare with music by A. Porinelly, at the Palace Theatre.

In 1906 there were reports that she was hospitalized in Vienna in 1906, found "violently insane" from "excessive dancing". She performed pantomime shows in London in 1908, in New York and Chicago in 1909, and in other American cities including San Francisco and Indianapolis in 1910. She owned a "small estate" in France.

Guerrero was described as a "famous beauty" in 1908. She posed for a series of portraits by German artist Friedrich August von Kaulbach, who considered them among his best work. Arthur Kampf's celebrated 1906 canvas, Spanische Tänzerin is similarly believed to be a portrait of Guerrero.

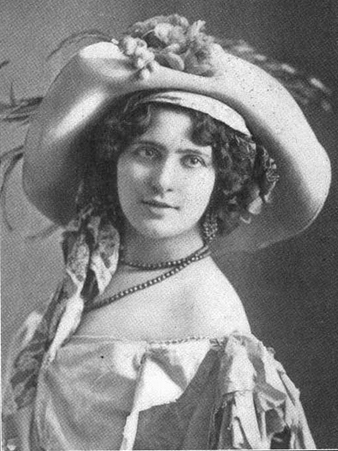
Rosario Guerrero, from a 1905 publication.

Her sister Enriqueta, billed as "the Little Guerrero" and "Guerrerrito", also worked as a dancer in London in the 1900s.
