= Arma Senkrah =

American musician (1864–1900)

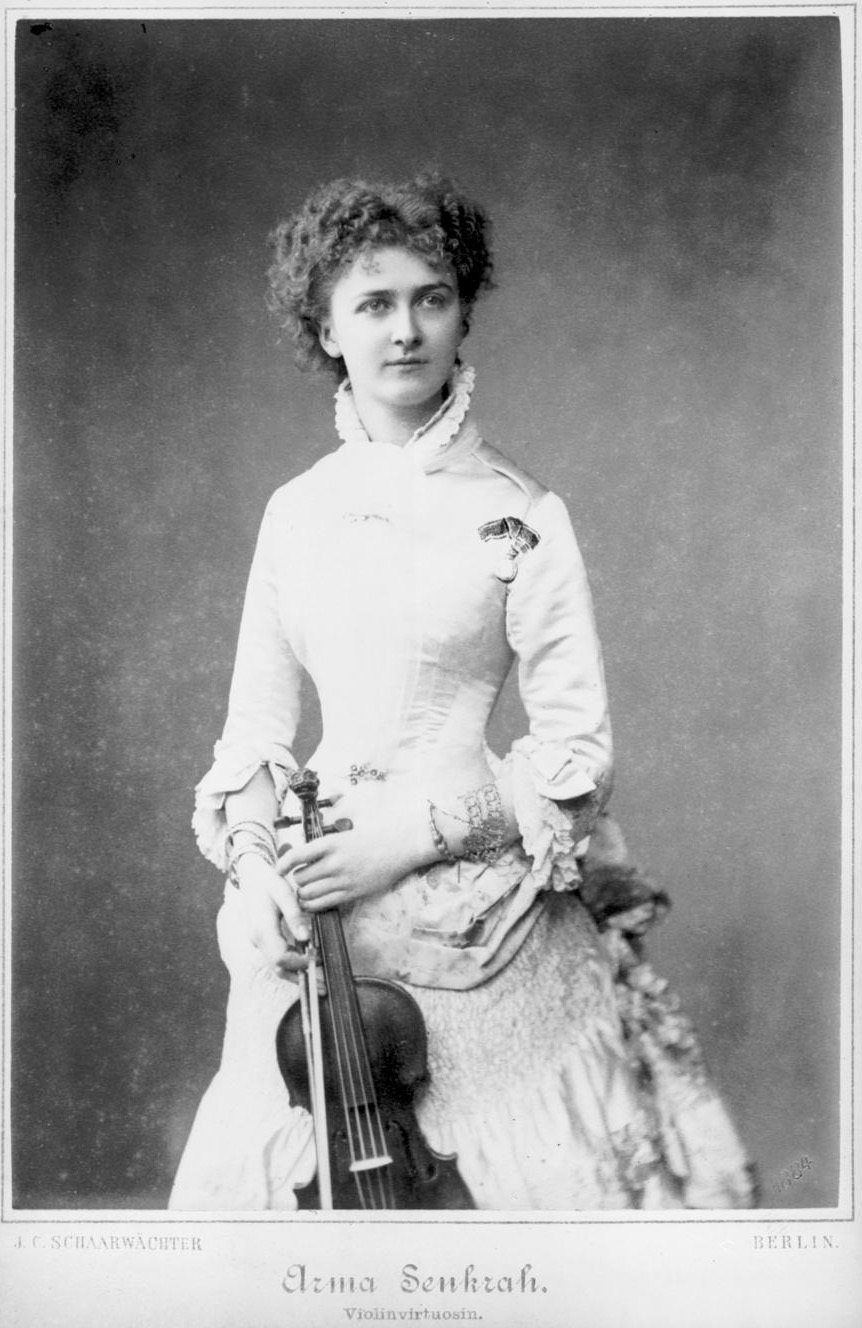
Arma Senkrah (1884)

Arma Senkrah (born Arma Levretta Harkness, 6 June 1864 – 3 September 1900) was an American violinist who performed in Europe. Her short career ended in marriage and then suicide.

Some time in the 1880s after her professional career in Europe began, her first name began to be attributed as Anna. There is no evidence to support this name; Anna was likely a misreading of Arma.

== Early life and education ==
Harkness was born in Williamson, New York, and she showed prodigious musical talents very early in life. When she was 3 years old, her family moved to Boston, where her father L. B. Harkness started a newspaper stand. At a very young age, Harkness studied violin and piano under her mother. She began violin lessons at age 5, and at age 7 began two years of study at the Boston Conservatory of Music under Julius Eichberg.

At age 9, Harkness then left to study in Europe, accompanied by her mother. She had intended to study with Ferdinand David, who died just before she arrived. From 1873 to 1875 she studied instead with Arno Hilf in Leipzig; during this time she met Otto von Bismarck who was enamored of her playing. Harkness went to Bremen in early 1876 and met Henryk Wieniawski, who encouraged her to continue her studies, so she and her mother went to Paris in hopes of finding more instruction.

They called upon Jean-Delphin Alard in hopes of private instruction. When he heard her play, he instantly arranged for her to be examined and interviewed for entrance to the Conservatoire de Paris for the term that had just begun three days prior. She matriculated and studied there for five years, under Lambert Massart and Charles Dancla. Rival orchestra leaders Édouard Colonne and Jules Pasdeloup vied for her talents.

During this time in Paris her reputation grew rapidly. Vieuxtemps would call upon her when visiting Paris, she performed at Rosine Laborde's soirees, and she played to the public at the 1878 Paris Exposition's concerts in Trocadéro Palace. In 1880 she won the conservatory's 2nd prize playing Pierre Rode's first concerto. An enthusiastic review in La Liberté said: "What purity of tone! What style! What marvellous skill! Her running staccati are surprisingly uniform. The enthusiastic demonstrations lasted until the end of the concerto. Next year Miss Harkness will surely obtain the first prize; it is a recompense she has a right to expect."

In 1881, she won the conservatory's first prize at age 17, receiving a Guadagnini violin inscribed with her name.

== Professional life ==
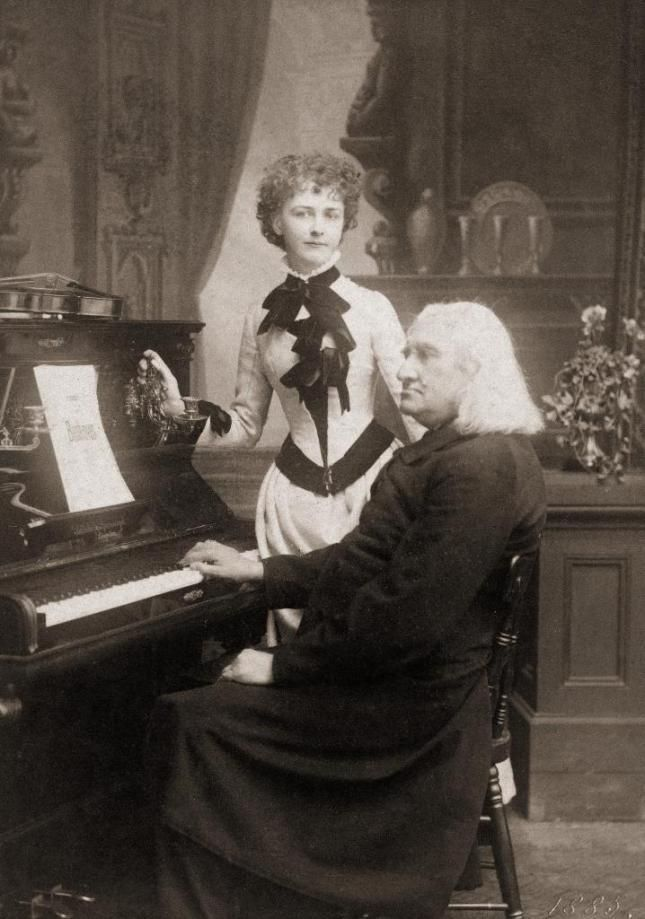
Arma Senkrah and Franz Liszt (1885)

She embarked on a successful career as a solo violinist at age eighteen in 1882. Her Berlin manager Hermann Wolff, believing that he could not market her as "Arma Harkness, from America", had her reverse her name and market herself as the more exotic "Arma Senkrah, from India". She became one of few female violinists to successfully establish her career during the 19th century, performing throughout Europe in the 1880s. Performances included:

- June 25, 1882 soirée at Marie Roze's house in London
- Her professional debut on 25 November 1882, London at Crystal Palace, performing the Vieuxtemps D minor Violin Concerto and Sarasate's Spanish Dance. She played Crystal Palace a few weeks later, playing Saint-Saens' Introduction and Rondo Capriccio, and Wieniawski's Polonaise Brillante.
- 1883 tour of Denmark and Sweden
- 1884 tour of Germany, including Jan 3 at the Leipzig Gewandhaus, September 30 in Berlin performing the Vieuxtemps D minor Concerto, and an early 1884 concert in Berlin attended by Joseph Joachim and Émile Sauret.
- Playing in Meningen at a ducal concert at the invitation of Hans von Bülow.
- 18 December 1885, Frankfurt Museum Concert, performing the Mendelssohn Violin Concerto.

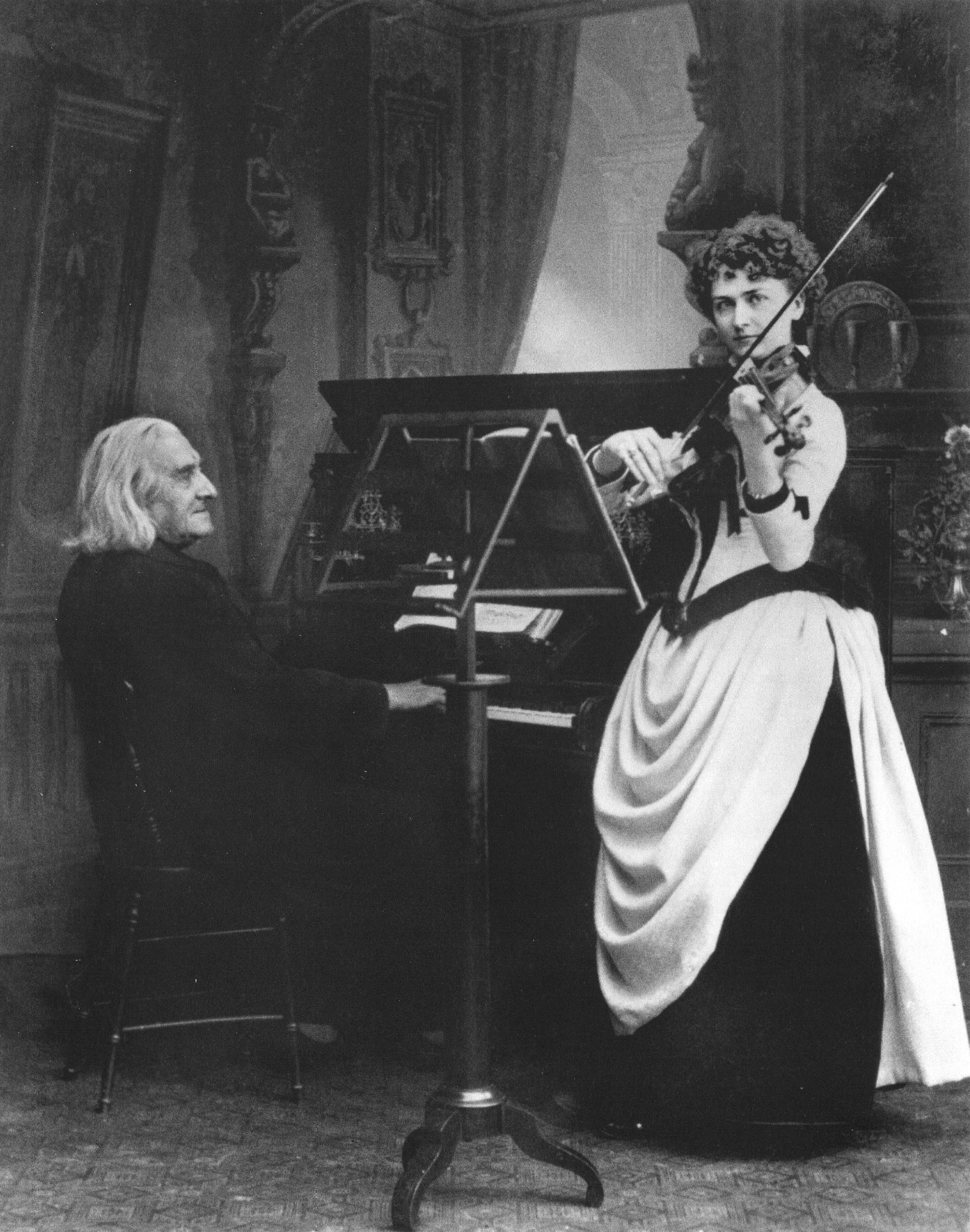
Performing with Liszt (1885)

In 1884 she became part of the circle around Franz Liszt in the last year of his life and settled in Weimar. She played Raff's Sonata Op. 73 with Moriz Rosenthal in one of Liszt's master classes. With Liszt accompanying, she played Beethoven's Spring sonata several times at Liszt's Altenburg matinée concerts. Some historians attribute much of her subsequent professional success by her capitalizing on her connection to Liszt, distributing photos of her and Liszt.

In 1885, she met Alexander Borodin in Weimar due to her association with Liszt.

In late 1886 she embarked on a concert tour of Russia, accompanied by George Liebling. In Moscow she met Tchaikovsky. Her performance with the Berlin Philharmonic on 4 October 1886 included his Sérénade mélancolique.

She was appointed chamber virtuoso to the court of the Grand Duke of Saxony Charles Alexander, where Karl Halir was the orchestra's concertmaster.

One of her last concerts was in Frankfurt, on 17 February 1888, where she played the G minor Violin Concerto by Max Bruch.

== Death and legacy ==
In 1888 she married a German lawyer from Weimar named D. Adolf Hoffmann, and stopped concertizing. On 3 September 1900, after twelve years of marriage, she shot herself with a revolver while in Weimar. Various reasons for suicide have been put forth, including a brain disorder, or according to Amy Fay, driven to despair over her husband's infidelities, or according to sensational newspaper articles driven to despair by her over-controlling husband who refused to allow her to perform, or even to "anonymous letters". Maud Powell hinted in a widely published 1908 article that Harkness' hatred for the violin caused her death. Amy Fay also wrote in a monthly music magazine from 1901 that Arma had shot herself through the heart. According to the same magazine, she had left behind a son.

Fauré, Váša Laub, and Gustav Hollaender all dedicated compositions to Senkrah. A collection of personal photographs and her carte de visite are archived at Brown University.

The 1750 Guadagnini she won at conservatory is now nicknamed after her. It was played Frida Scotta and from 1937-1997 by Isaac Stern. She owned a 1685 Stradivarius that is also now nicknamed after her.

Cellist Louis Milch, who was principal cellist in Johann Strauss II's orchestra in Vienna before moving to Minnesota, named his daughter Arma Senkrah Milch. She too became a violinist, most notably forming a duo and trio with her sisters and playing on the Orpheum Vaudeville circuit from 1908-1912.
