= Marietta Sherman Raymond =

American conductor and violinist (1862–1949)

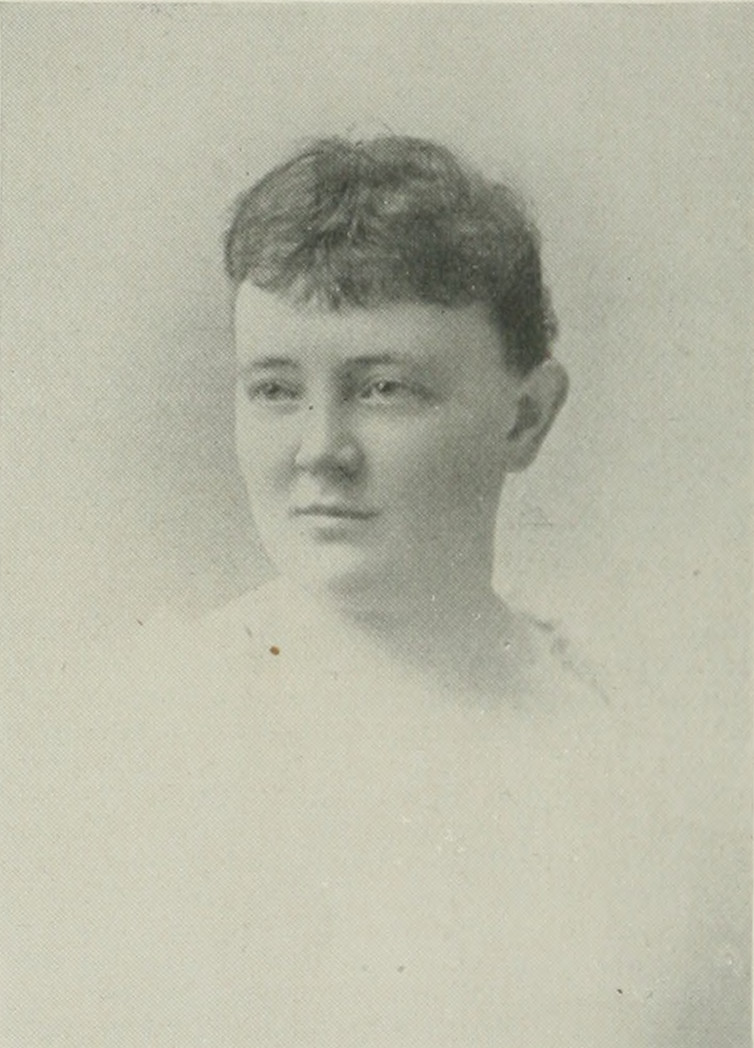
- Portrait photo from A Woman of the Century

Background information
- Born: Marietta Ruth Sherman; July 5, 1862; Lowell, Massachusetts, US
- Died: September 22, 1949 (aged 87) Brookline, Massachusetts, US
- Genres: Popular music; classical music
- Occupations: Violinist; musical educator; orchestral conductor
- Instrument: Violin
- Member of: Beacon Orchestral Club; Raymond Orchestra
- Spouse: J. Maxfield Raymond (m. 1892)

Marietta Sherman Raymond (née, Sherman; 1862–1949) was an American musical educator and orchestral conductor, as well as a successful violinist. In 1892, in Boston, Raymond was regarded as the most successful violin soloist, among women, while noting, too, that she conducted an orchestra of 50 young women, many of whom were prominent in Boston society. She was the leader and manager of the Beacon Orchestral Club and the Raymond Orchestra.

== Early life and education ==
Marietta (nickname, "Etta") Ruth Sherman was born in Lowell, Massachusetts, July 5, 1862.

She showed a strong liking and talent for music, and at the age of seven, she began the regular study of the art. With her parents, she removed to Boston, and at the age of nine, commenced the study of the piano and organ. After a short course on the piano, she began the study of the violin, with William Shultz, formerly first violin of the Mendelssohn Club. She afterwards studied with Julius Eichberg and Charles N. Allen, being with the latter for ten years.

== Career ==
As teacher of violin, she joined the faculty of Wellesley College of Music, 1891–96. In addition, she had about 50 private pupils.

It is as leader of the Beacon Orchestral Club that she was best known. That club grew from six young women at its starting point of 1881, to 50 under Raymond's training and direction. Of these, however, many were amateurs, so it did not number a strictly professional membership of over 25. Many of the members belonged to the most prominent families of Boston. The players presented a striking appearance in costumes of white silk, with gold cord trimmings. They won success during various seasons, playing in New York City for the Frank Leslie magazine's Doll Fair, for the Woman's Charity Club in the Boston Music Hall, and for many weddings and receptions given by society people. Their repertory was extensive, and embraced both popular and classical music, with solos by the different instrumentalists. The opinion of the press in the various towns and cities where the club appeared was that it was justly entitled to the claim that "it is the finest ladies' orchestra in the world." During the summer months, Raymond divided the club and furnished music in the various hotels.

Under her direction, the club became a prominent women's orchestral ensemble of the period. An orchestra composed entirely of women was unusual at the time. Most of its players were American, and it included an unusually large number of women performing on wind instruments, which were then rarely played by women.

== Personal life ==
She made her headquarters in the Hoffman House, Boston.

On March 24, 1892, in Boston, she married J. Maxfield Raymond.

Marietta Sherman Raymond died in Brookline, Massachusetts, September 22, 1949.
