= Frida Scotta =

Danish violinist (1871–1948)

- Frida Scotta in 'The Picture Magazine' in 1896
- Born: Frida Schytte; March 31, 1871; Copenhagen, Denmark
- Died: April 29, 1948 (aged 77); Ohlstadt, American occupation zone in Germany
- Other names: Frida von Kaulbach
- Education: Conservatoire de Paris (1890)
- Years active: 1888–1903
- Spouse: Friedrich August von Kaulbach
- Children: 3
- Honours: Royal Medal of Recompense

Frida Scotta (31 March 1871, Copenhagen – 29 April 1948, Ohlstadt) was a Danish violinist who performed under a stage name. She was born Frida Schytte in Copenhagen on 31 March 1871 and married the painter Friedrich August von Kaulbach in 1897, taking his surname to become Frida von Kaulbach.

Scotta trained with Lambert Massart and Henri Berthelier at the Conservatoire de Paris. She went on to have international success as a violinist, taking concert tours through Austria-Hungary, France, Germany, Russia, Scandinavia, and the United Kingdom. She was decorated by several European courts, including the gold Royal Medal of Recompense in 1893.

== Career ==
By the age of 6, Frida demonstrated abilities with the violin. Before the age of 15, her father gave her a Stradivarius. She received her first formal violin lessons from royal chapel musicians Ferdinand Stockmarr and Valdemar Tofte in 1884.

In 1888, at the age of 17, she took Tofte's recommendation and traveled to Paris to continue her training at the Conservatoire de Paris. She passed the conservatoire's entrance exam and was admitted in 1888. There, she was instructed by Lambert Massart and Henri Berthelier. While studying in Paris, she took trips back to Denmark to perform. In Copenhagen, she was a soloist at a philharmonic concert in 1889, and in the spring of 1890, she toured Denmark with the pianist Helga Thiess. She graduated from the Conservatoire with distinction in 1890.

After making her 1889 debut in Copenhagen, she built her career around concert tours, on which her mother chaperoned her. Her tours gained her fame in Austria-Hungary, France, Germany, Russia, Scandinavia, and the United Kingdom. She most frequently performed in Germany, where she was associated with venues in Baden-Baden, Berlin, Frankfurt, Mainz, Munich, and Wiesbaden.

Her repertoire included the violin concertos of Felix Mendelssohn, Max Bruch, Camille Saint-Saëns, and Henryk Wieniawski, as well as chamber music of Johann Sebastian Bach, Ludwig van Beethoven, Edvard Grieg, and Johan Svendsen. She was particularly known for her performance of Zigeunerweisen and a variety of French virtuoso pieces. She was known to have performed alongside cellist Hugo Becker, pianist and later author Annette Kolb, and pianist Hermann Zilcher. In addition, she maintained personal relationships with Carl Flesch, Paul Grümmer, Ingeborg Bronsart von Schellendorf, Hans Bronsart von Schellendorff, and Richard Strauss and his wife Pauline.

It had become more common for women to pursue musical careers as violinists in the 1880s, however, Scotta still faced criticism that her male contemporaries did not. Critics noted that her performances were more soulful than sentimental, and that she played with an unusually high tone for a woman. Comparisons were often drawn between her, Teresina Tua, and Arma Senkrah, as all three were popular female concert violinists in Europe. She retired from her work as a violinist when expecting her third child, making her final performance in 1903.

== Personal life ==
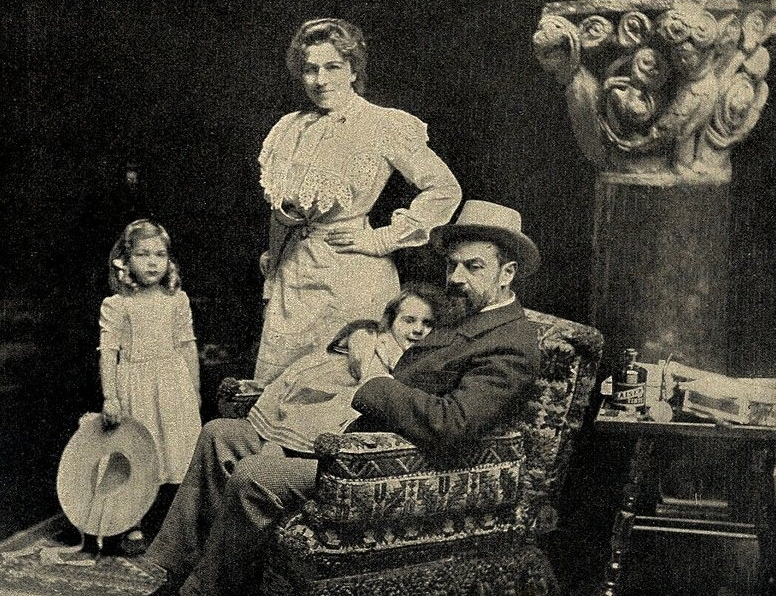
Frida, her husband Friedrich August von Kaulbach, and their daughters Doris and Hedda, 1902

Frida Schytte was born on 31 March 1871 in Copenhagen. Her mother, Ausa Høhling (1837–1916), was Icelandic. Her father, Carl Frederik Vilhem Schytte (1832–1899), was a lawyer of the Supreme Court and member of the Folketing. Her younger sister, Henriette, was born in 1873.

On 15 May 1897 she married Friedrich August von Kaulbach. The pair met while she was touring in Germany. Von Kaulbach was a painter and art collector who often used his Frida as a model for his valued portraits of women. A large number of his works featuring her survive, where she is depicted with the violin, used as a model for allegorical subjects, or presented with their children. She was also used as a model by Reinhold Begas for a monument to Wilhelm I, German Emperor. After their marriage, the couple settled in Munich were von Kaulbach had established his art career. They spent several months of the year at their country villa in Ohlstadt. When he died in 1920, Frida withdrew from public life and moved to Ohlstadt permanently.

She and her husband had three children: Doris (1898–1950), Henriette (1900–1992), and Mathilde (1904–1986). Frida taught her daughters to play the violin. Eventually, Doris switched to playing the viola and Henriette to the cello. Thus, she and her three daughters formed a string quartet which performed for family guests. Her daughter Henriette, or Hedda, became a renowned painter in Munich and Amsterdam. Her youngest daughter, Mathilde, became a musician herself and performed as a singer. Like her mother, Mathilde married a painter, Max Beckmann, who used her as the subject of many of his portraits. Mathilde and Max stayed with Frida at the villa in Ohlstadt frequently during the 1920s and 30s.

== Gallery ==
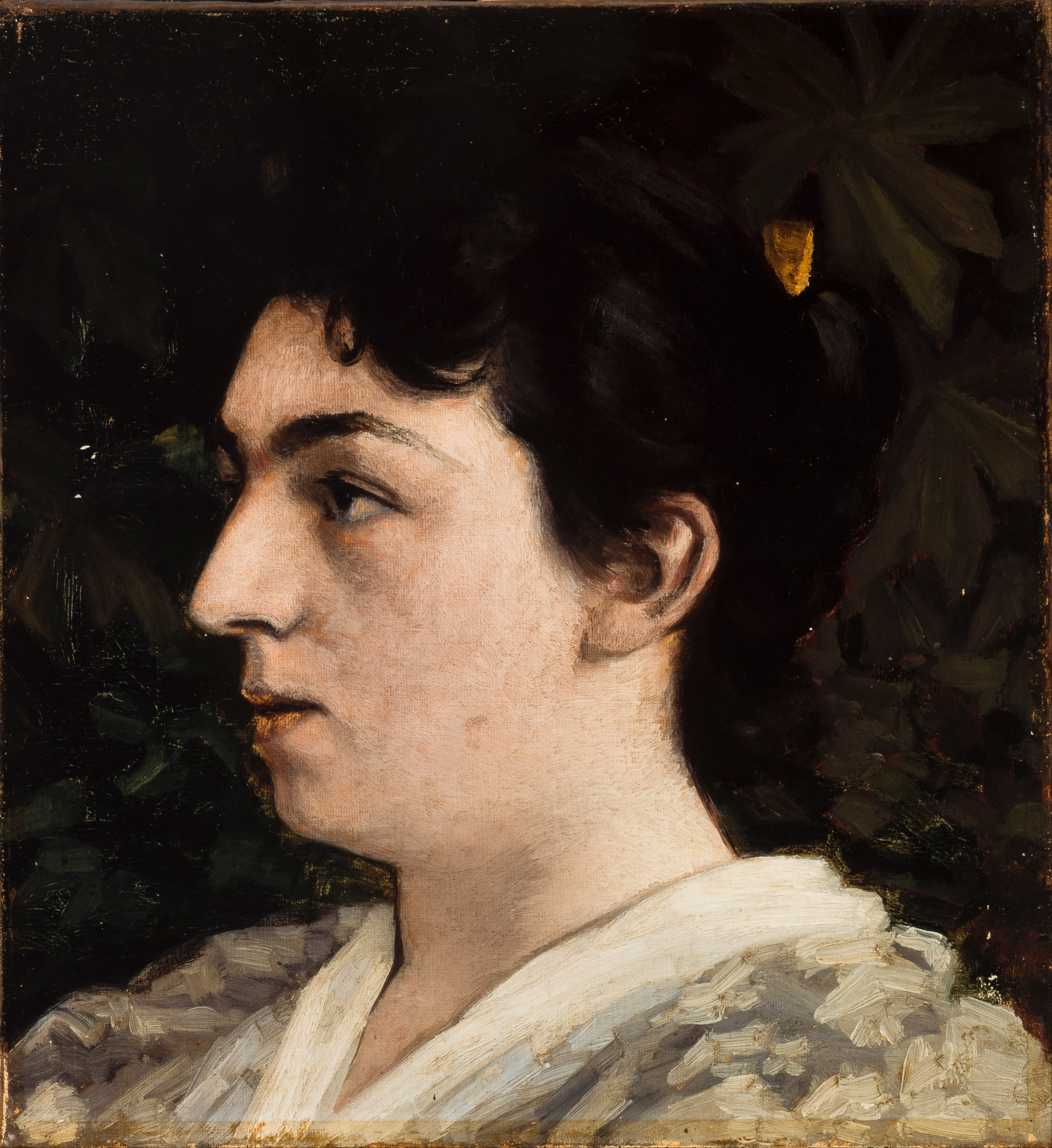
Portrait of Frida by Valdemar Schønheyder Møller, 1893

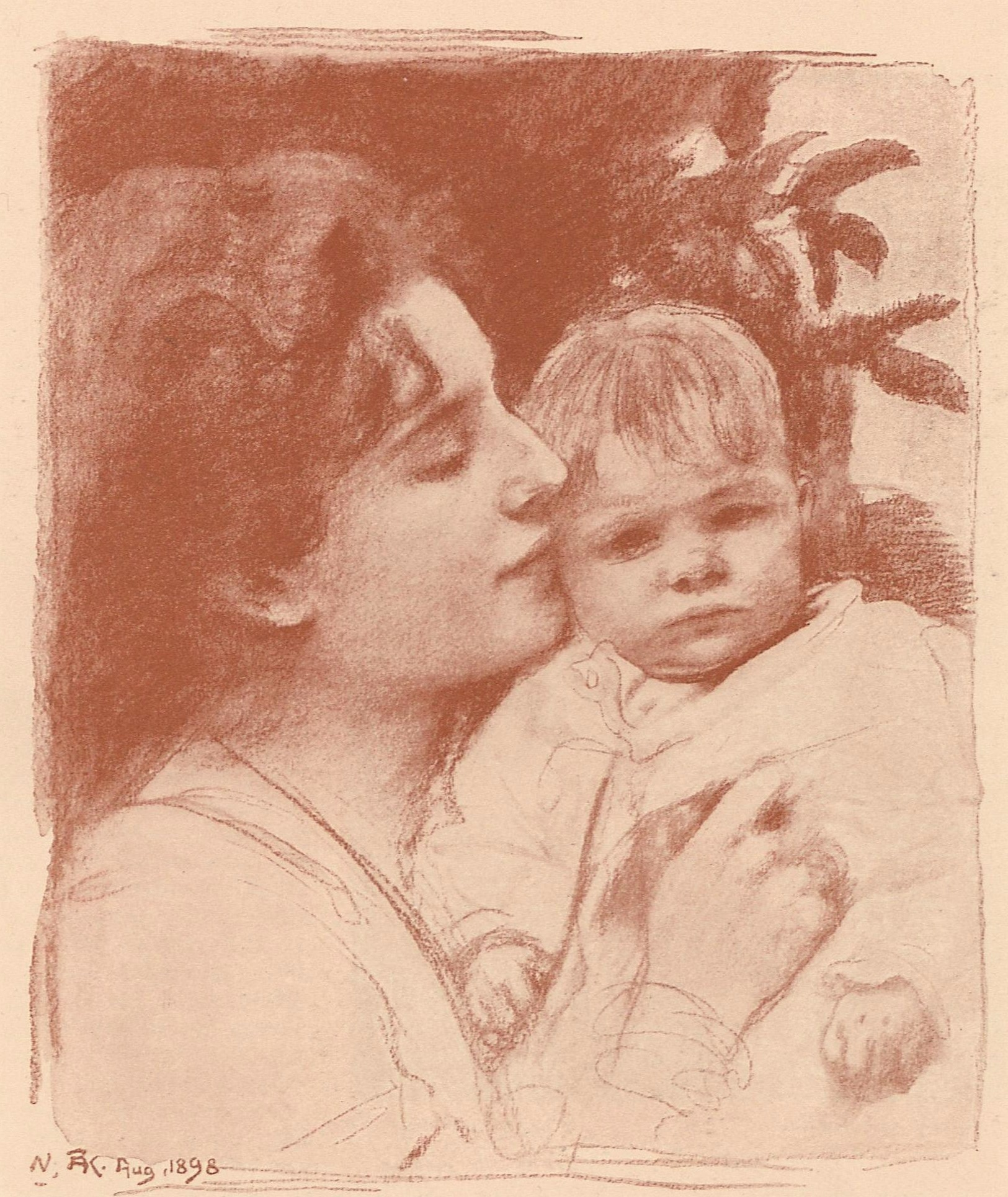
Frida and her daughter Doris in Frau von Kaulbach, Friedrich August von Kaulbach, August 1898

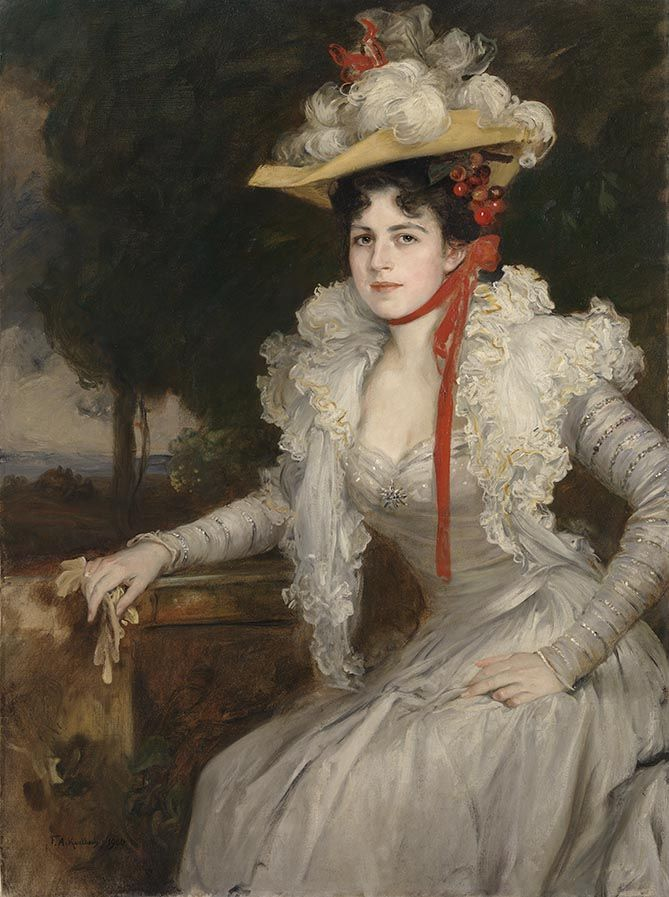
Die zweite Frau des Künstlers, Friedrich August von Kaulbach, oil on canvas, 1900

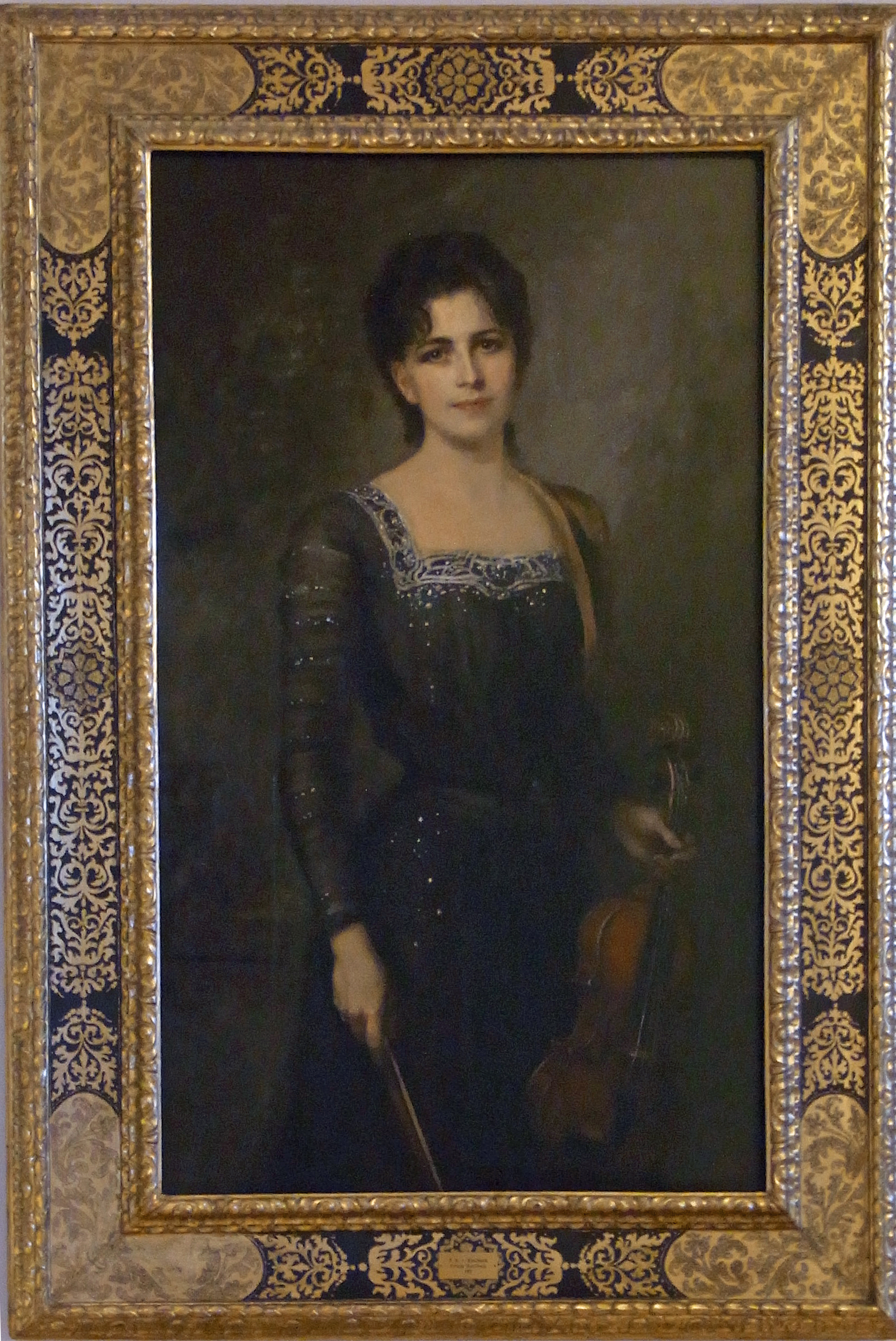
Die Frau des Künstlers mit Geige, Friedrich August von Kaulbach, oil on canvas, 1901

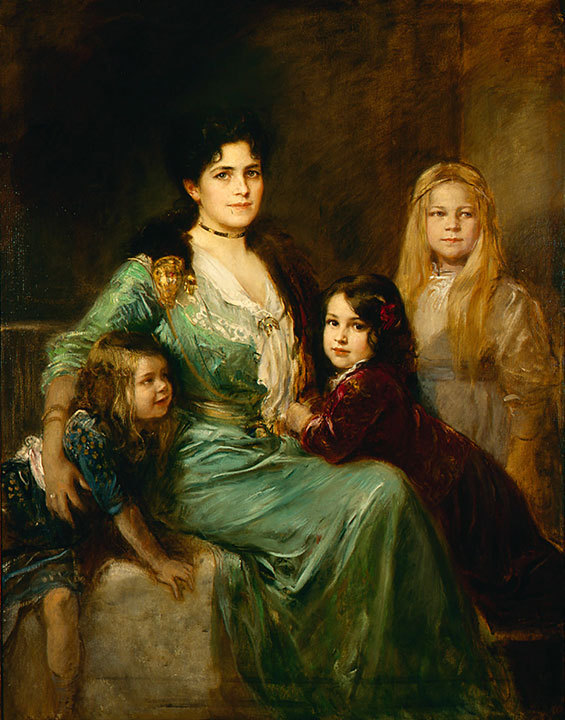
Porträt der Familie des Künstlers, Friedrich August von Kaulbach, oil on canvas, c. 1907
