= Kaulback =

Kaulback is a surname. Notable people with the surname include:

- Henry Kaulback (1830–1896), Canadian lawyer, ship owner, and politician
- Ronald Kaulback (1909–1995), British explorer, botanist, and geographer

== See also ==
- Kaulbach
