= Friedrich August von Kaulbach =

German painter

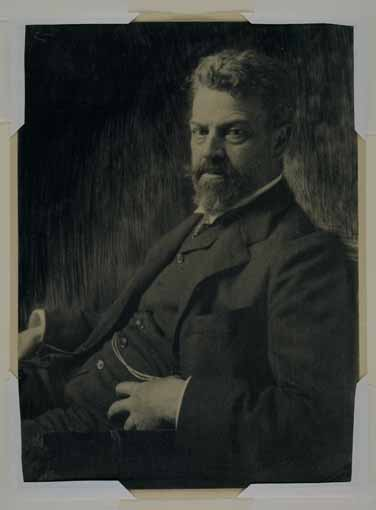
- Kaulbach in 1907; photograph by Frank Eugene
- Born: 4 June 1850; Munich, Kingdom of Bavaria
- Died: 26 July 1920 (aged 70); Ohlstadt, Germany
- Education: Kunstgewerbeschule
- Known for: portraitist, historical scenes
- Notable work: Spanish Dancer, Girl in the Woods, Girl with her dog
- Spouse: Frida Scotta
- Children: 3

Friedrich August von Kaulbach (2 June 1850 – 26 July 1920) was a German portraitist and historical painter.

Along with Franz von Lenbach and Franz von Stuck, he was known as one of the "Malerfürsten" (Enghlish: painter princes) and was one of the highest paid portrait painters in Germany. His works were commissioned by the uppermost social circles there and in America.

== Career ==
Friedrich August von Kaulbach was born on 2 June 1850 in Munich, Kingdom of Bavaria, to a family that included several well known artists. His brother, Sigmund (1854–1894), was also a painter, as were his half-siblings, Anton and Antonie. His half-sister, Isidore, was a novelist. Friedrich himself began his studies with his father, Friedrich Kaulbach.

Von Kaulbach then attended the Academy of Fine Arts, Nuremberg, where he studied with August von Kreling and Karl Raupp. He transferred to the Academy of Fine Arts, Munich, in 1871 and worked with Wilhelm von Diez. In 1883, he became a teacher there himself. Several stays in Paris followed. In 1886, he was appointed Director of the Academy of Fine Arts in Munich and was ennobled. He was also a member of the Prussian Academy of Art in Berlin.

== Personal life ==
In 1872, he married Anna Johanne Wilhelmine Lahmeyer (1849–1925), though the couple later divorced. On 15 May 1897, he married Frida Scotta, a famous Danish violist whom he had met while she was touring in Germany. He an Frida had three daughters: Doris (1898–1950), Henriette (1900–1992), and Mathilde (1904–1986). Henriette, or Hedda, became a renowned painter in Munich and Amsterdam. Their youngest daughter, Mathilde, became a singer and married the painter Max Beckmann. Mathilde and Max stayed at the family villa in Ohlstadt frequently during the 1920s and 30s, where Beckmann used von Kaulbach's former art studio.

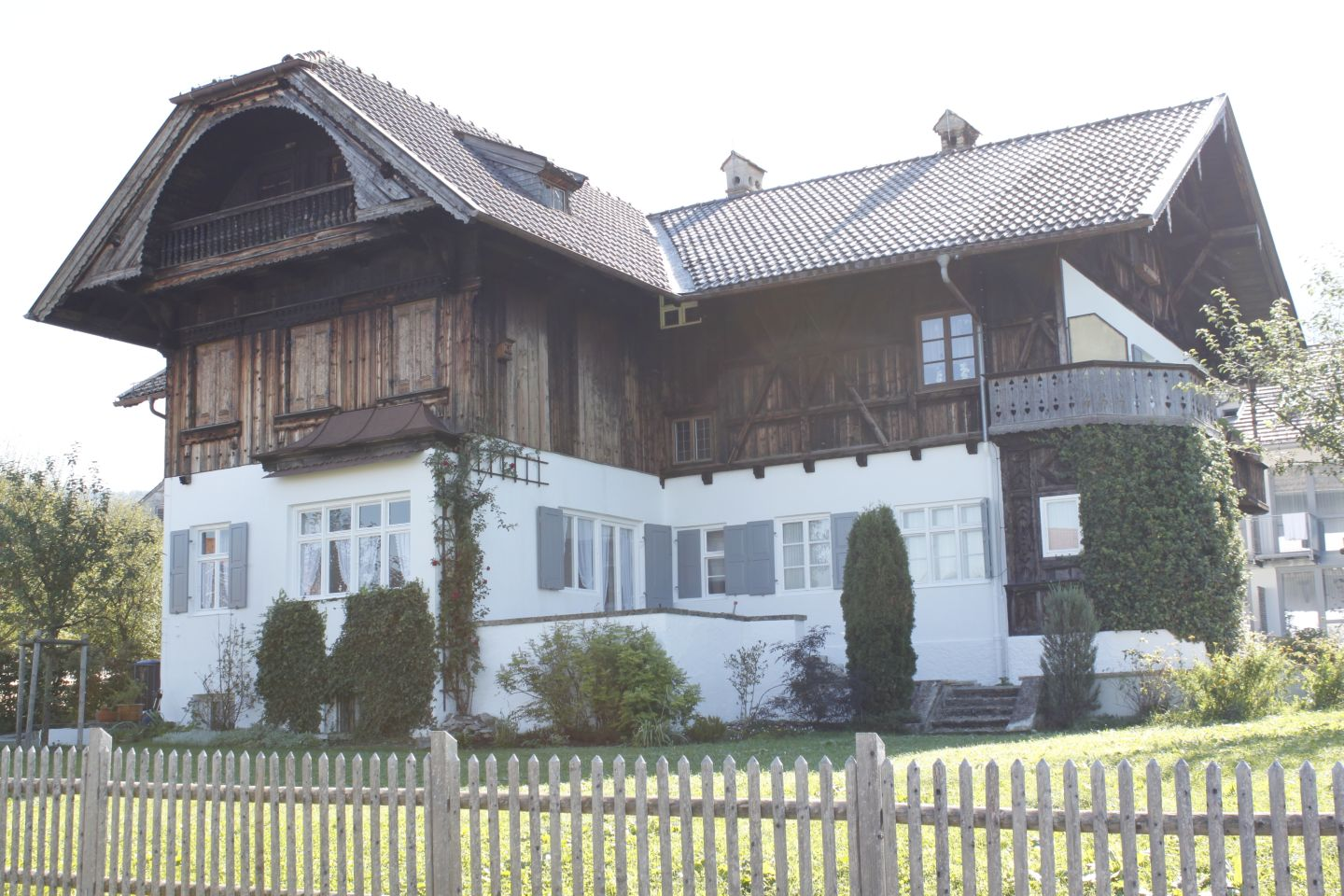
The Kaulbach Villa in Ohlstadt, built in 1893

In 1893, the Kaulbach Villa was built in Ohlstadt according to his designs. The villa served as the family's second summer residence and was his primary residence from 1910 until his death in 1920. Since 1997, it has been a museum, showing thirty of his paintings, a number of drawings, and his studio which is maintained in its original state.

== Selected paintings ==
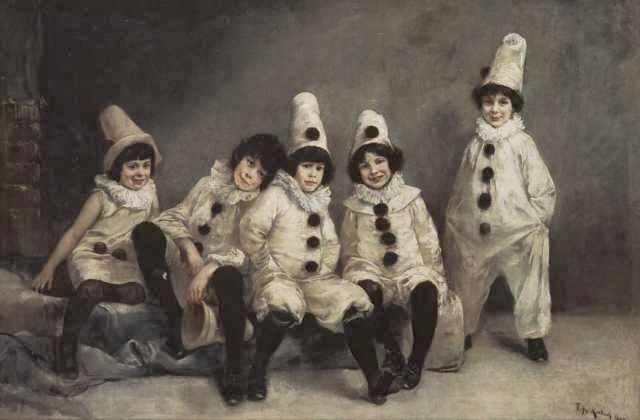
Children's Carnival (1888), depicting the five children of mathematician Alfred Pringsheim, including Katia Pringsheim (far left)

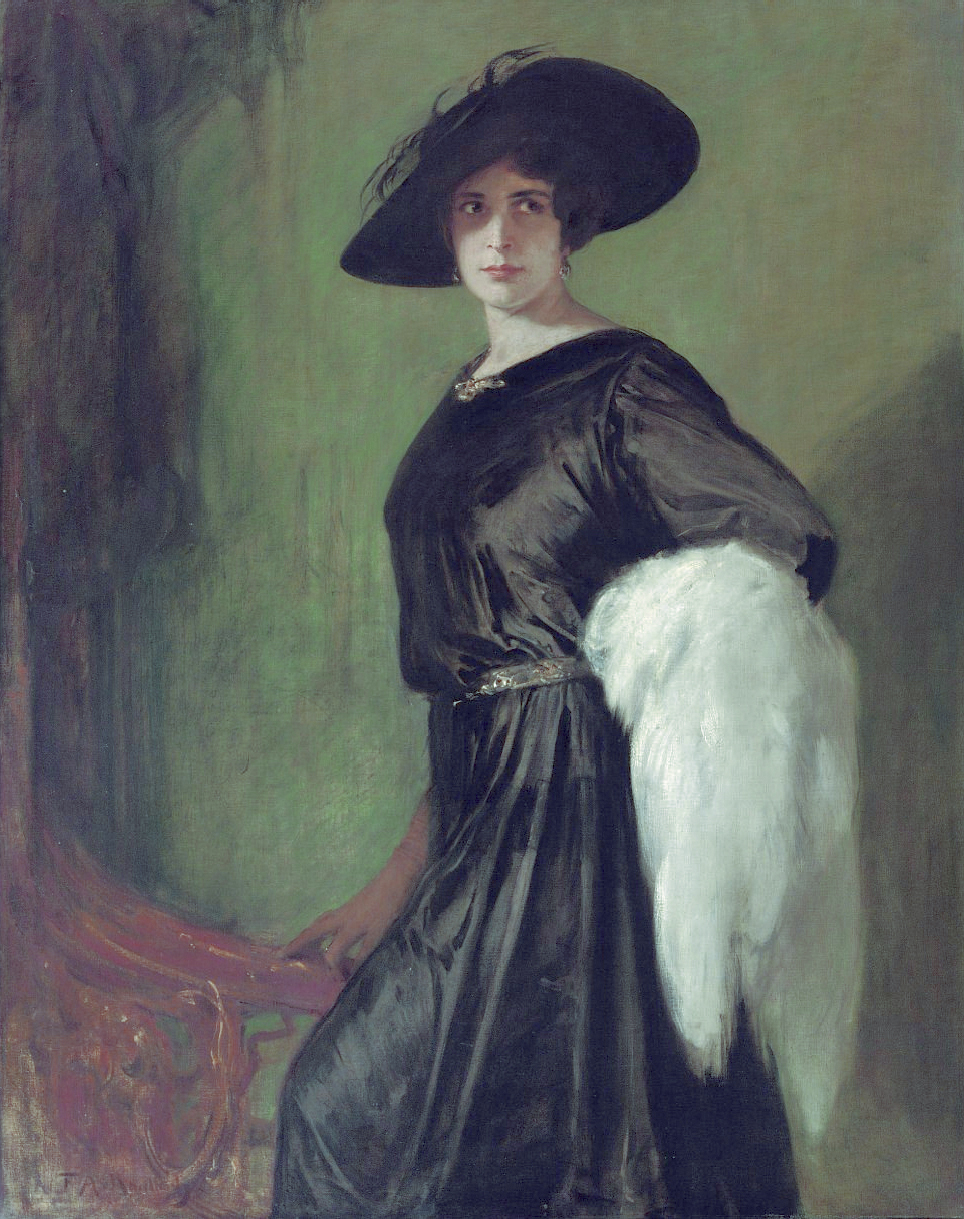
Portrait of the actress, Hanna Ralph

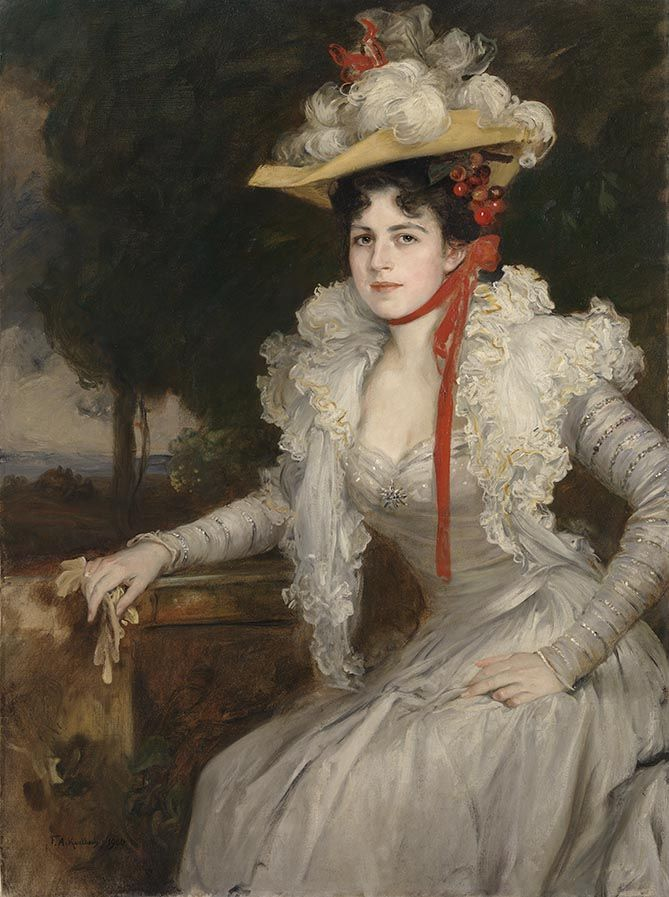
Frieda Kaulbach, geb. Scotta, die zweite Frau des Künstlers, 1900

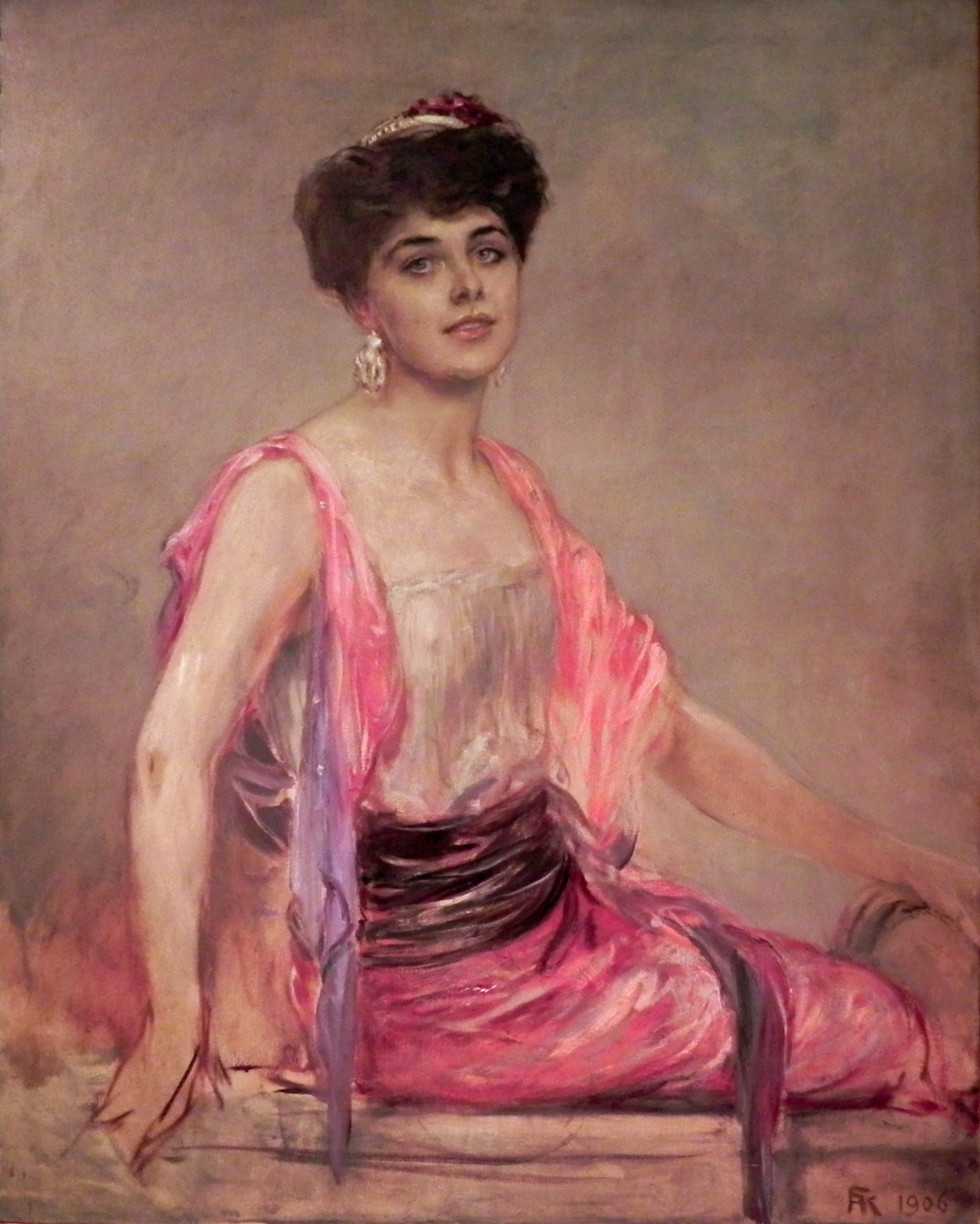
Studie zu einem Bildnis der Sängerin Geraldine Farrar, 1906

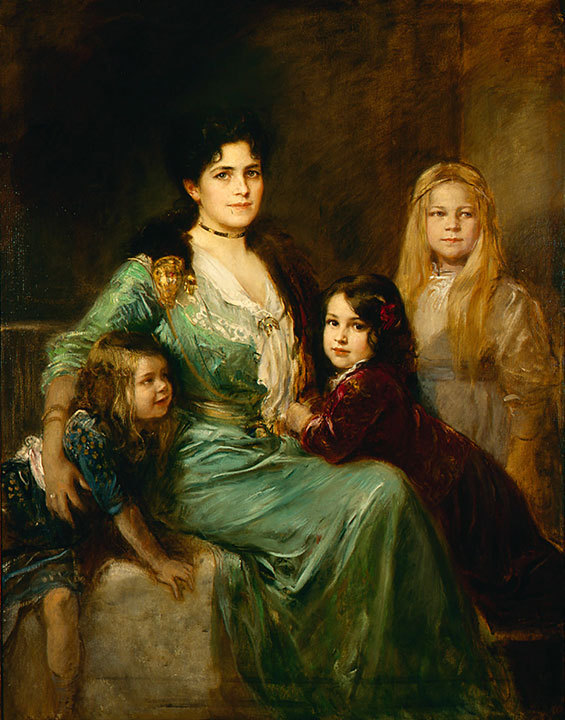
Porträt der Familie des Künstlers, featuring von Frida and his three daughters, c. 1907

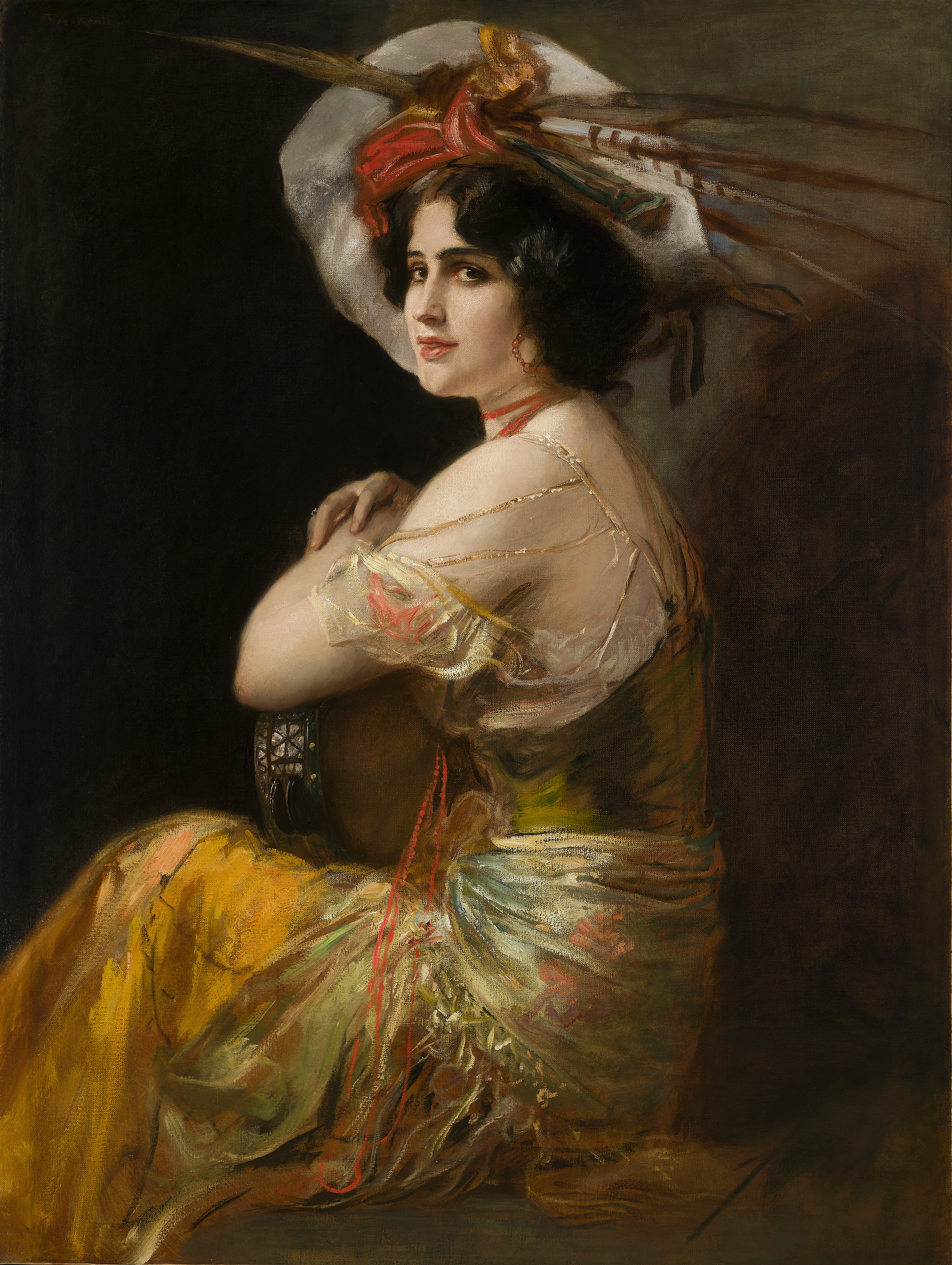
Rosario Guerrero als Carmen or The Spanish dancer, c. 1908

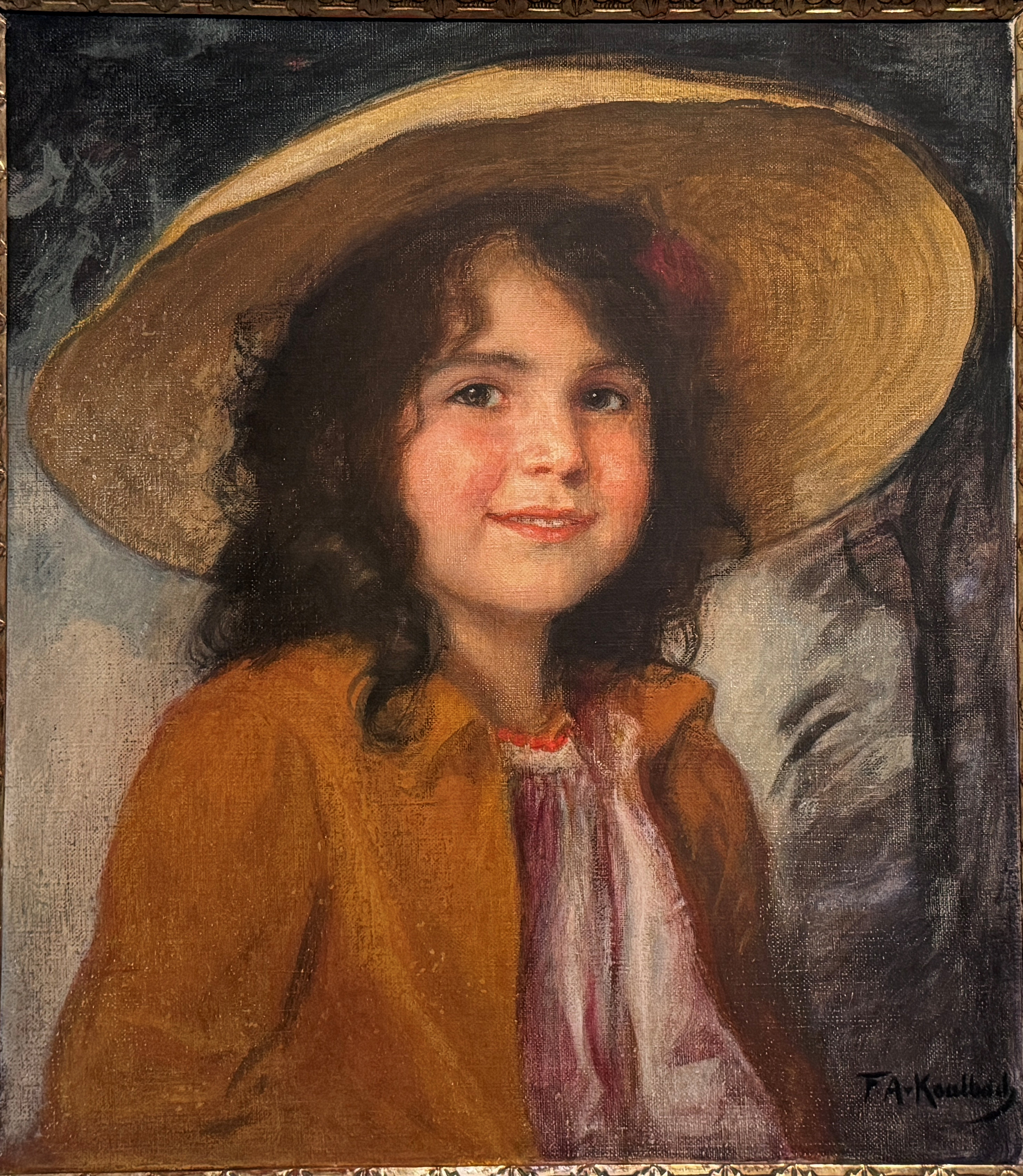
Portrait of Hedda, Anhaltische Gemäldegalerie Dessau

== See also ==
- List of German painters
