= Anton Kaulbach =

German painter

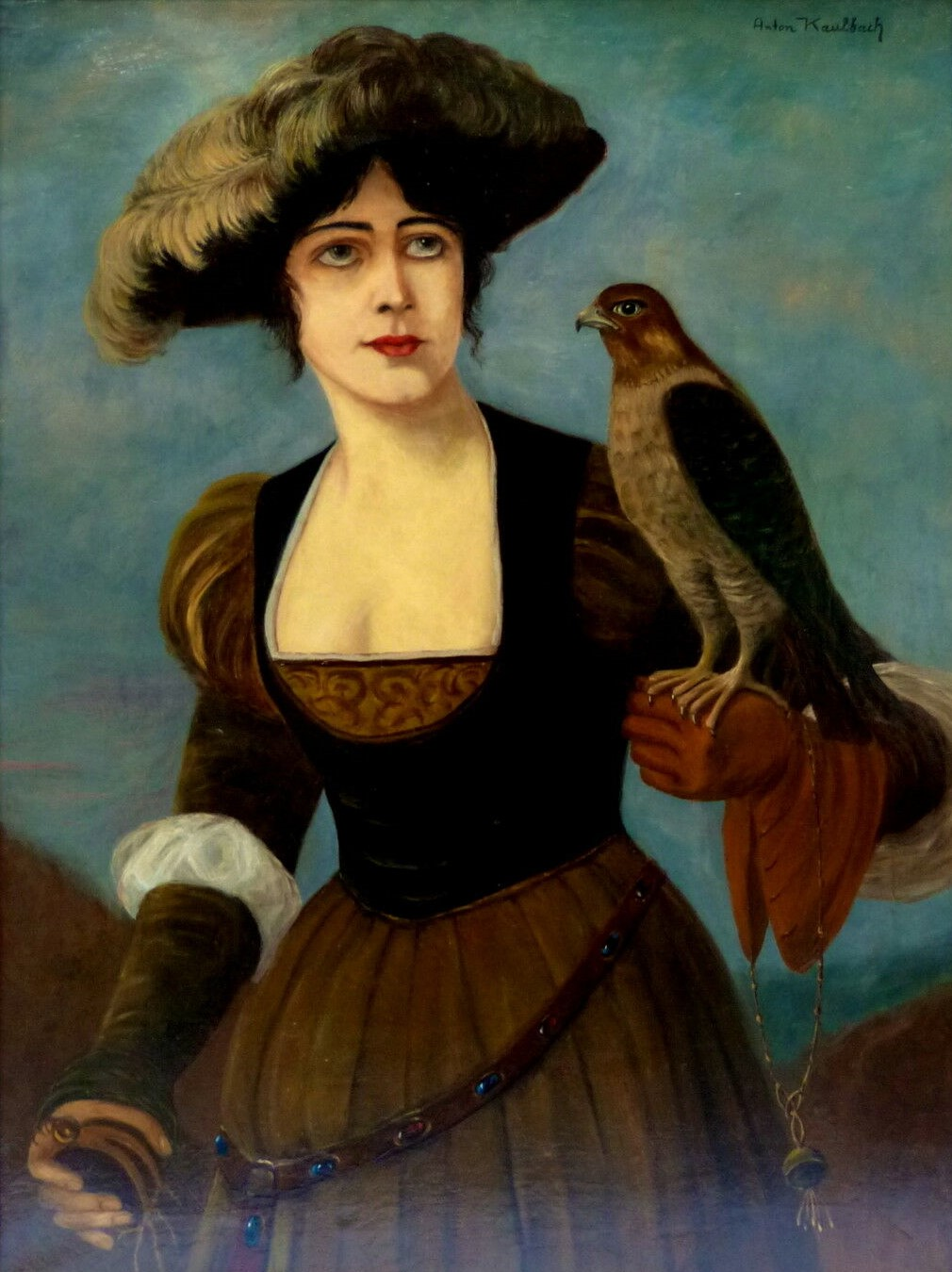
Falconer

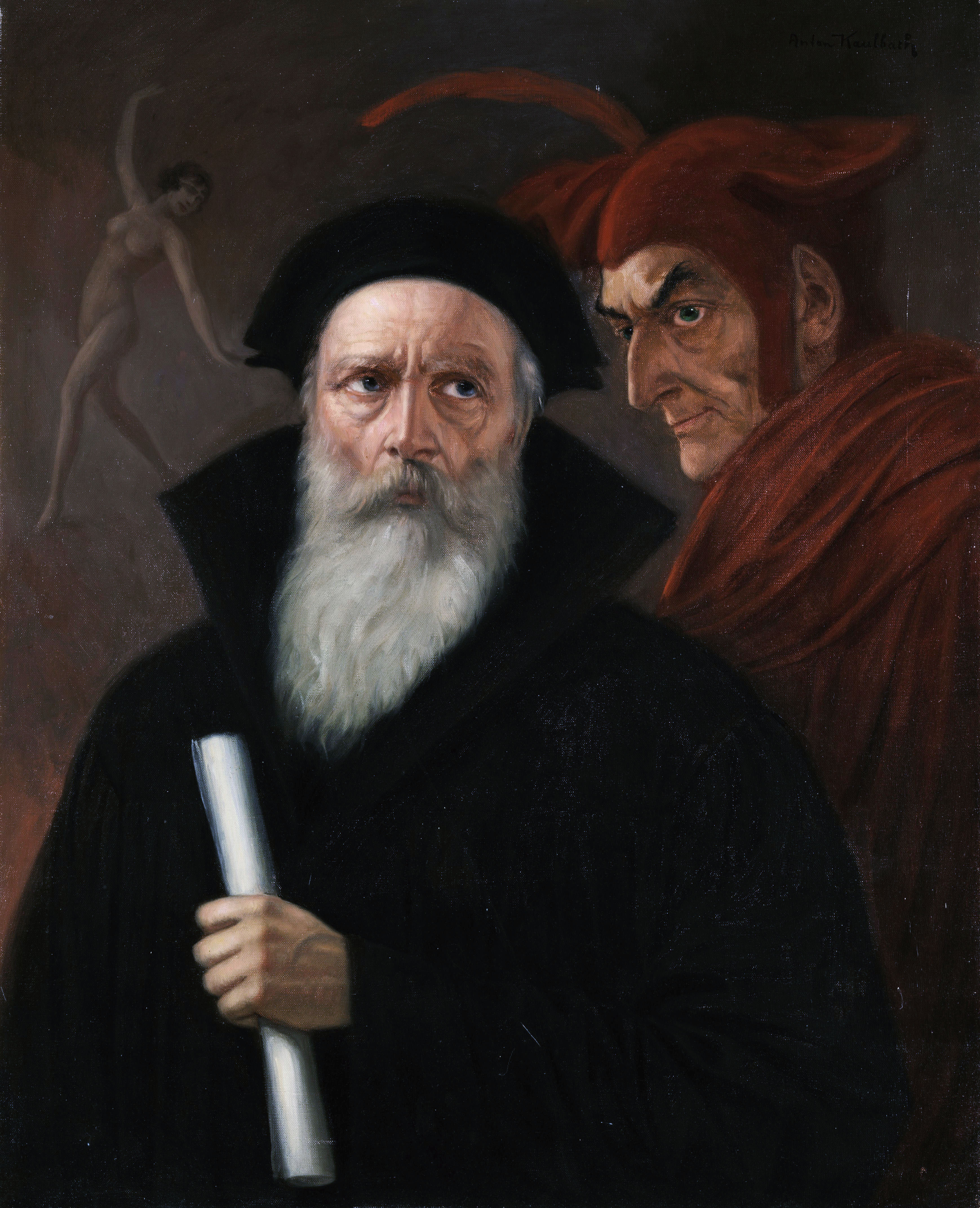
Faust and Mephisto

Wilhelm Anton Kaulbach (8 August 1864 – 23 April 1934) was a German portrait painter.

== Biography ==
He was born in Hanover to the painter, Friedrich Kaulbach, and his third wife, Marie, née Wellhausen. His sister, Antonie, and his half-brothers, Friedrich August and Sigmund (1854–1894) were also painters. He became deaf while still a small child, and attended a special deaf-mute school in Hildesheim. He was there for nine years, living with foster parents.

His first lessons in art came from his father. In 1882, Friedrich August brought him to Munich, where he studied at the Academy of Fine Arts. In 1883, he joined a group for the hearing impaired, the "Monachia Gruß". In 1888 he had his first showing at a major venue; displaying his painting Two Chess Players at an exhibition in the Glaspalast. He would later focus on portraits, but continued to produce the occasional genre painting.

From 1895 to 1900, he lived in Hamburg. In 1898, he married Eva Bohl (1878–1953), from Grabow, who would serve as a model for many of his paintings. They had three children. Their daughter, Gisela, would become a sort of conservator for his works, and helped identify many whose authorship was in question.

After 1901, he lived in Berlin and was named an honorary member of "Hufeisen Kunst und Handwerk" (Horseshoe Arts and Crafts), a deaf-mute society founded by Heinrich Fick.
