= Henriette Agnete Kitty von Kaulbach =

Dutch artist

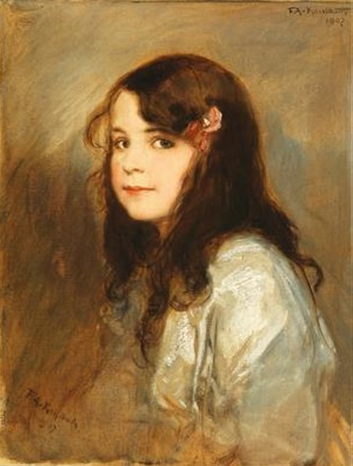
- Portrait of Daughter Hedda, 1907 by Friedrich August von Kaulbach
- Born: 6 February 1900; Munich, Germany
- Died: 1992 (aged 91–92)
- Other names: Hedda von Kaulbach
- Known for: Painting

Henriette Agnete Kitty "Hedda" von Kaulbach (1900–1992) was a German–Dutch painter.

== Biography ==
Von Kaulbach was born on 6 February 1900 in Munich. She was the daughter of the musician Frida Scotta and the artist Friedrich August von Kaulbach. She attended the Akademie der Bildenden Künste (München) (Academy of Fine Arts, Munich). She was married for a time to the German sculptor Toni Stadler (1888-1982). From the late 1920s to the mid 1940s she lived in Amsterdam. Von Kaulbach's work was included in the 1939 exhibition and sale Onze Kunst van Heden (Our Art of Today) at the Rijksmuseum in Amsterdam. Von Kaulbach died in 1992.
