= Valdemar Schønheyder Møller =

Danish painter

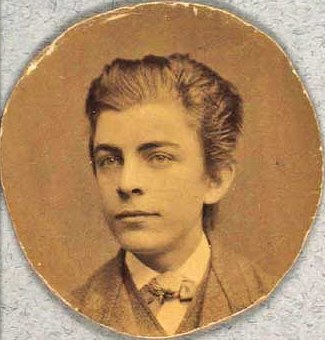
Valdemar Schønheyder Møller (1880s)

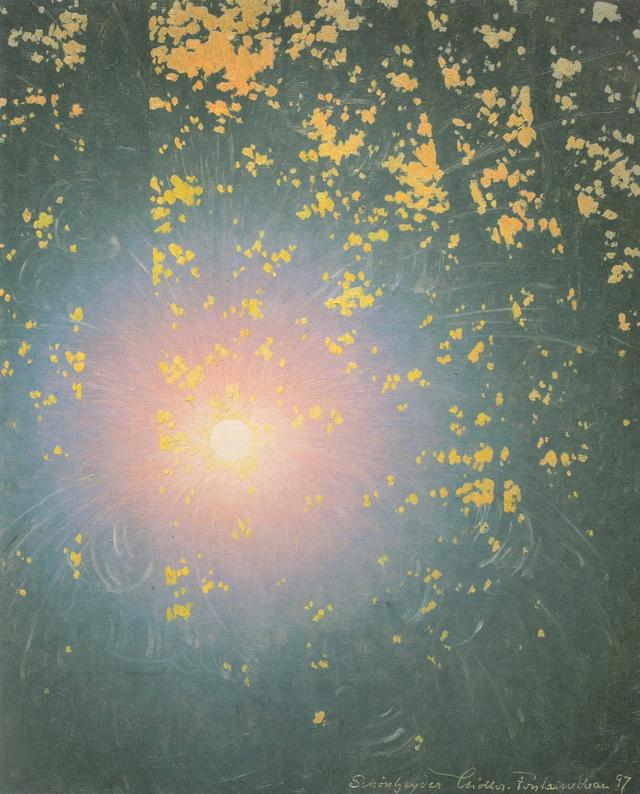
Fontainebleau (1897)

Valdemar Christian Schønheyder Møller (5 January 1864 – 3 May 1905) was a Danish painter, known principally for his depictions of sunlight.

== Biography ==
Møller was born at Aarhus, Denmark. He was the son of Carl Johan Ferdinand Møller (1815–73) and Reinholdine Christiane Schønheyder (1835–1904).

He began his art studies at the Royal Danish Academy of Fine Arts (1883–84), then switched to the Kunstnernes Frie Studieskoler, where he studied under the supervision of P.S. Krøyer. It was there he became friends with Vilhelm Hammershøi (1864–1916) and took photographs that became the basis for some of Hammershøi's early paintings. He was, in fact, one of the earliest Danish painters to use photography as an artistic medium.

In 1891, he moved to Skagen, where he became acquainted with the Skagen Painters, and remained there until 1893. It was in Skagen that he began his intensive study of the effects of light.

In 1894, he went to Paris to join his brother, Tyge, who was an art collector; then settled in Fontainebleau in 1896. He continued his studies of light, producing a series of over thirty works with the sun's direct light as their theme; many depicting the sun as rises, shining through the trees. Sometimes, he would briefly stare at the sun, to recreate the lights and colors induced in his retina. He soon became known as the painter of the sun (Le peintre du Soleil).

Although largely forgotten today, he was once a familiar figure at exhibitions, including the Charlottenborg Spring Exhibition (1885–87, 1889–92), the Salon de la Société Nationale (1895–1903) and at Exposition Universelle (1889) and Exposition Universelle (1900).

Throughout his life, he suffered from bipolar episodes. In 1901, he was admitted to Århus Sindssygehospital, the psychiatric hospital in Aarhus and remained there until his death in 1905.
