= Friedrich Kaulbach =

German painter (1822–1903)

Theodor Friedrich Wilhelm Christian Kaulbach
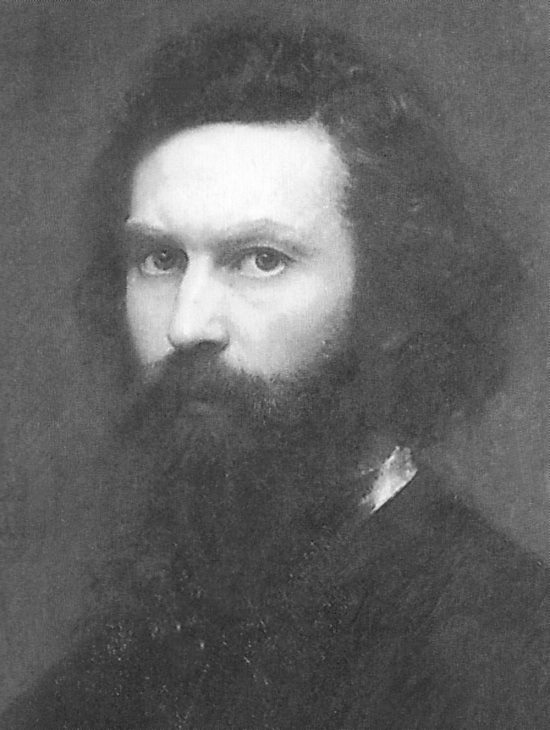
- Kaulbach in 1862 (Self-portrait?)
- Born: 8 July 1822; Bad Arolsen, Principality of Waldeck and Pyrmont
- Died: 17 September 1903 (aged 81); Engesohde, Hanover
- Known for: portraitist, historical scenes
- Notable work: Portrait of Girl and Dog, Coronation of Charlemagne
- Movement: late Romantic
- Awards: Gold Medal, Berlin Art Academy, 1873
- Patrons: George V, King of Hannover

Theodor Friedrich Wilhelm Christian Kaulbach (8 July 1822 – 17 September 1903) was a German painter from Bad Arolsen, Principality of Waldeck and Pyrmont. His father was Christian Kaulbach (1777–1847), a cabinet maker in Arolsen. He was also the cousin and at one time the student of the painter Wilhelm von Kaulbach, son of Philipp Karl Friedrich v. Kaulbach (1775–1846), goldsmith and amateur painter.

== Early years ==
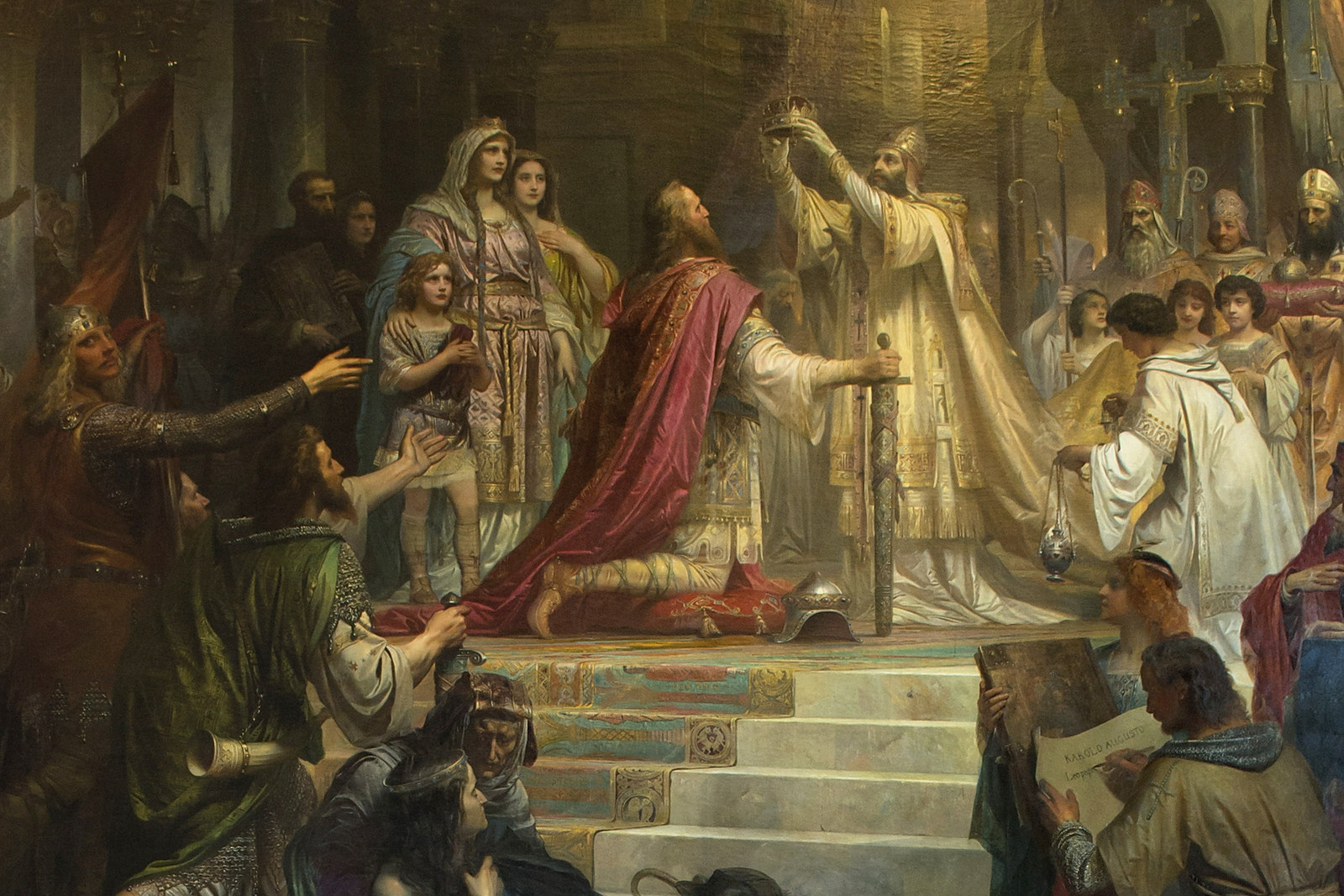
Coronation of Charlemagne, 1861

After a visit to Venice in 1844, he and his uncle parted ways. He painted independently until 1848, when he executed the painting Adam and Eve beside the body of Abel. This led to a call to a professorship at the Academy of Fine Arts, Munich, which he declined.

In 1850 he traveled to Paris, where he produced historical paintings, and supported himself through portraiture. In 1850, Maximilian II of Bavaria commissioned him to paint the Coronation of Charlemagne for the Museum Maximilianeum. The picture was completed in 1861.

== Establishment as court painter in Hanover ==
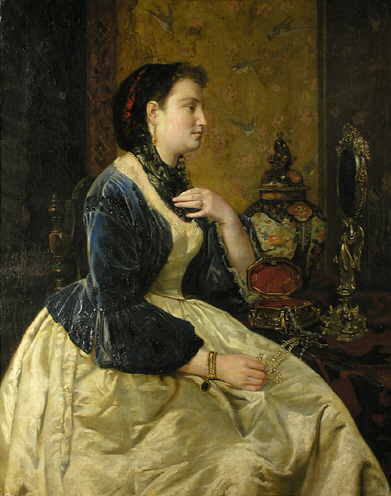
Woman at her jewelry table

Kaulbach served as the court painter to King George V, whom he repeatedly portrayed, where he was a favorite portrait painter of the local nobility. While he was the court painter to Hanover, he received a professorship at the Technical University. Among other benefits, the king gave him his own studio and residential building, designed by the architect Christian Heinrich Tramm (1857–60) on Waterloo Street in Hanover. The house today is part of the Waterloo Beergarden. In her memoirs, his daughter Isidore described the visitors to the family home, who included Johannes Brahms, Clara Schumann, Franz Liszt, Joseph Joachim, Ernst von Wildenbruch and Anton Rubinstein.

His numerous portraits, such as those of Empress Elisabeth, Crown Prince Albrecht, and the Count and Countess Stolberg, are extraordinarily detailed. His best women's portraits enhanced his reputation. Kaulbach received the Gold Medal from the Berlin Art Academy at the 1873 Vienna World's Fair.

Friedrich Kaulbach's grave may be found at the Stadtfriedhof Engesohde in Hanover.

Kaulbach's sons, Friedrich August, Anton and Sigmund (1854–1894) were also painters.

== Prominent works ==
- Adam and Eve by Abel's Body (1848, Museum für Bildende Künste, Leipzig)
- Elisabeth Nay (1860; Niedersächsisches Landesmuseum)
- Coronation of Charlemagne (1861, Maximilaneum, München)
- Juliet Capulet’s Wedding Morning (1862–1903; Niedersächsisches Landesmuseum, Hannover)
- Blind King George V (c. 1866; Hannover, Niedersachs. Landesmuseum)
