= David Owen Norris =

British pianist, composer, academic, and broadcaster

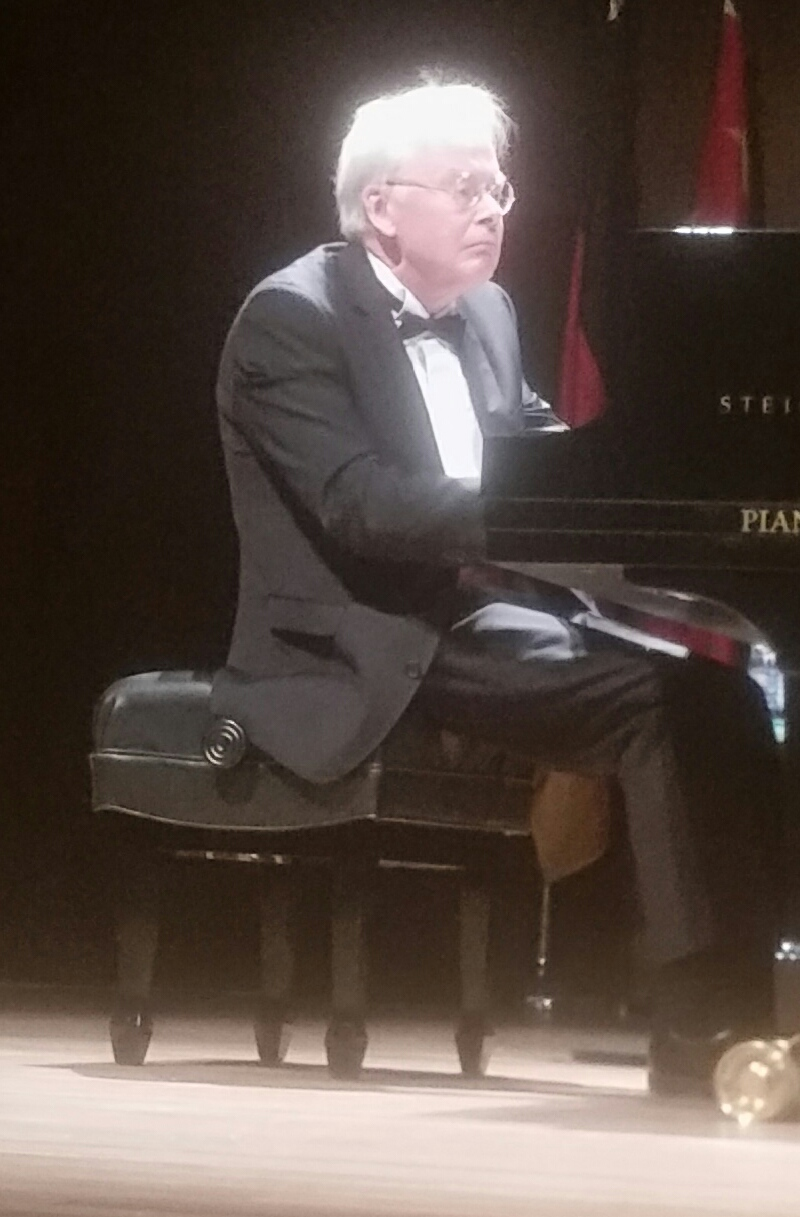
- Norris performing in Montreal, 2017
- Born: June 16, 1953 (age 73); Long Buckby, Northamptonshire, England
- Education: Keble College, Oxford
- Musical career
- Occupations: Pianist, composer, academic, broadcaster
- Instrument: Piano
- Website: www.davidowennorris.com

David Owen Norris, FSA (born 16 June 1953) is a British pianist, composer, academic, and broadcaster.

== Early life ==
Norris was born in Long Buckby in Northamptonshire, England, later attending Daventry Grammar School. He took lessons locally from composer Trevor Hold before going on to study music at Keble College, Oxford where he was organ scholar; he is now an Honorary Fellow of the college.

== Career ==
After leaving Oxford, he studied composition and worked at the Royal Opera House as a repetiteur. As a pianist, he has accompanied soloists such as Dame Janet Baker, Larry Adler and John Tomlinson, and his solo career has included appearances at the Proms and performances with the Chicago Symphony Orchestra and Detroit Symphony Orchestra.

He has also presented the Playlist Series for BBC Radio 4, and appeared in a number of television documentaries.

== Academia ==
He is a professor at the University of Southampton where he is head of keyboard, and a visiting tutor at the Royal Northern College of Music. He has also been Gresham Professor of Music and a professor at both the Royal College of Music and the Royal Academy of Music (having earlier been a student there).

== Composition ==
Norris has enjoyed success as a composer in a wide range of musical styles. His Piano Concerto and Symphony were first performed at Dorchester Abbey by the English Music Festival, as was his oratorio Prayerbook, which has been frequently performed and studied subsequent to its premiere.

His song cycles Think Only This (settings of war poetry) and Tomorrow Nor Yesterday (settings of the poetry of John Donne) have been released on a disc entitled Fame's Great Trumpet. His operas and operettas, including Die! Sober Flirter and The Jolly Roger, have been performed on BBC Radio and around the UK and Europe, as have several pastiches of Mozart.

== Honours ==
In 1991, Norris received the Gilmore Artist Award.

== Recordings ==
(* = Premiere recordings)

=== Piano concertos ===
- Constant Lambert, Rio Grande (Gilmore Festival Records) Yoshimi Takeda KSO 1996
- Constant Lambert, Piano Concerto (ASV CD WHL 2122) Barry Wordsworth BBCCO* 1999
- The World's First Piano Concertos [on Square Piano] (Avie AV0014) Sonnerie 2003
- Edward Elgar, Piano Concerto realised Walker (Dutton CDLX 7148) David Lloyd-Jones BBCCO* 2005
- Joseph Horovitz, Jazz Concerto (Dutton CDLX 7188) Horovitz Royal Ballet Sinfonia 2007
- Richard Arnell, Piano Concerto (Dutton CDLX 7184) Martin Yates RSNO* 2007
- Montague Phillips, Piano Concertos in F♯ minor and in E (Dutton CDLX 7206)*Gavin Sutherland BBCCO 2008
- Victor Hely-Hutchinson, Jazz Concerto 'The Young Idea: cum grano salis’ (Dutton CDLX 7206)* 2008

=== Solo piano ===
- Edward Elgar/Sigfrid Karg-Elert, First Symphony (AVM AVZ-3024)* 1990
- Elgar, Sketches for Third Symphony (NMC D052)* 1998
- Peter Maxwell Davies, Farewell to Stromness (MPR 203) 1998
- Elgar, Complete Piano Music (Elgar Editions EE 002)* 2003
- George Dyson, Complete Piano Music (Dutton CDLX 7137)* 2004
- Elgar, Songs & Piano Music played on Elgar's 1844 Broadwood (Avie AV2129) Amanda Pitt, Mark Wilde, Peter Savidge (Two world premieres*) 2007
- Audio-guide to the Cobbe Collection of Composer-related instruments at Hatchlands, playing pianos formerly belonging to J. C. Bach, Charles Dibdin, Johann Baptist Cramer, Frédéric Chopin, Sigismond Thalberg, Franz Liszt, Georges Bizet, Edward Elgar etc. 2008
- Elgar/Karg-Elert/Norris, Symphonic Study Falstaff, Pomp & Circumstance (Elgar Editions EECD009)* 2009
- Giles Easterbrook, The Moon Underwater: Chamber music and piano solo (Prima Facie PFCD002)* 2010
- Roger Quilter, Complete Piano Music (EMR CD02)* 2011
- Felix Mendelssohn, Complete Songs Without Words (not yet released)

=== Vocal ===
- Roger Quilter, Songs (Hyperion A 66208) David Wilson-Johnson, baryton
- Percy Grainger, Songs (Pearl SHE 572) David Wilson-Johnson, baryton
- Franz Schubert, Winterreise (Hyperion A66111) David Wilson-Johnson 1984
- Arthur Somervell, Songs (Hyperion CDA 66187) David Wilson-Johnson 1986
- Benjamin Britten, The Turn of the Screw (Collins 70302) Bedford, Lott, Langridge 1993
- Gerald Finzi, Songs (GMN CO116) David Wilson-Johnson 1996
- Britten, Saint Nicolas, Steuart Bedford, Philip Langridge Naxos 8.557203 1996
- Schubert, Songs by Ludwig Gotthard Kosegarten and Johann Wolfgang von Goethe [including the only recording of Schubert's first song-cycle] (Dogstar DS001) Ian Partridge, Jennifer Bates, Ruth Peel* 2000
- Granville Bantock, Songs (Dutton CDLX 7121) Jean Rigby, Peter Savidge 2002
- London Pride (Song Recital), Catherine Bott (Hyperion CDA67457)* 2004
- Quilter, Complete Duets and Traditional Song Arrangements (Naxos 8.557495) Amanda Pitt, Joanne Thomas, Philip Langridge, David Wilson-Johnson, baryton* 2005
- Edward Elgar, Songs & Piano Music played on Elgar's 1844 Broadwood (Avie AV2129) Amanda Pitt, Mark Wilde, Peter Savidge (Two world premieres*) 2007
- Music of the Pleasure Gardens (Signum Classics SIGCD101) Philip Langridge 2007
- Trevor Hold, Song Cycles (Dutton CDLX 7213) Amanda Pitt, David Wilson-Johnson* 2008
- Victor Herbert, Songs (Linn CKD335) James Gilchrist* 2009
- Priez pour paix War-Songs (Prelude CDPR2550)* Philip Langridge, Jennifer Langridge 2010
- Entertaining Miss Austen (Dutton Epoch CDLX 7271) Amanda Pitt, John Lofthouse * 2011
- Britten in Scotland (Naxos 8.572706) Mark Wilde 2011
- Mr. Hook's Original Christmas Box (Dogstar DS010) Highcliffe Junior Choir* 2011

=== Chamber music ===
- Arnold Bax, Piano Quintet (Chandos CHAN 8795) Mistry Quartet 1990
- Edward Elgar, Piano Quintet (Argo 433 312–2) Mistry Quartet 1991
- Camille Saint-Saëns, The Carnival of the Animals (Chandos 9244) I Musici di Montreal
- Norris, All Together Now (Gilmore Festival Records)* 1996
- Frank Bridge, Viola Music (ASV CD DCA 1064) Louise Williams 1999
- George Dyson, Complete Chamber Music (Dutton CDLX 7137)* 2004
- Ludwig van Beethoven, Viola Arrangements (Toccata TOCC 0108)* Paul Silverthorne 2010
- Francis Poulenc, Babar the Little Elephant; Saint-Saëns, The Carnival of the Animals (the latter with David Coram at the Organ of Romsey Abbey, and both with narration by Richard Briers) Cathedral Classics CCCD101 2011
- Percy Sherwood, Music for cello & piano (Toccata) Joseph Spooner *Feb 2012
- John Blackwood McEwen & Arnold Bax, Viola Sonatas (EM Records) Louise Williams* Feb 2012
- Alan Rawsthorne, Kenneth Leighton, Elizabeth Maconchy, Gordon Jacob, Viola Music (EM Records) Louise Williams* Summer 2012

=== Radio programmes ===
- A History of Private Life (BBC Audio 2010 ISBN 978-1-4084-6745-9. – 6 CDs)
- From Ivory To Plastic (1998), BBC Radio 4 – From Ivory To Plastic at BBC Online
