= David Wilson-Johnson =

British operatic and concert baritone (born 1950)

David Wilson-Johnson (born 16 November 1950, in Northampton, England) is a British operatic and concert baritone.

== Career ==
David Wilson-Johnson was educated at Wellingborough School, and studied Modern and Mediaeval Languages at St Catharine's College, Cambridge. As a singer he studied at the Royal Academy of Music in London, where he won the Dove Prize for most distinguished student.

In 1976, Wilson-Johnson made his operatic debut in Henze's "We Come to the River" at the Royal Opera House at Covent Garden, where he subsequently sang important roles in many operas. In 2006, he decided to retire from the stage production of opera performance, but return to stage Swallow for "Peter Grimes" (dir. Willy Decker / cond. Yutaka Sado) at Teatro Regio di Torino in 2010. He is still involved in giving concerts (including opera's concert version) worldwide with the major orchestras and recitals with his regular pianist David Owen Norris.

David Wilson-Johnson was Professor of Singing at the Conservatory of Amsterdam from 2005 to 2010, and is a Fellow of the Royal Academy of Music.

He has worked with prominent conductors including Vladimir Ashkenazy, Frans Brüggen, Pierre Boulez, Charles Dutoit, Carlo Maria Giulini, Nikolaus Harnoncourt, André Previn, Sir Simon Rattle, Gennadi Rozhdestvensky, and Evgeny Svetlanov.

== Proms ==
After the 9/11 attacks of 2001 he sang Beethoven's Ninth Symphony under Leonard Slatkin at the 2001 Last Night of the Proms to a worldwide audience of 340 million.

== Discography ==
- Haendel : Dixit Dominus and Coronation Anthem n°1, Monteverdi Choir and Orchestra, dir. John Eliot Gardiner, with Felicity Palmer and Margaret Marshall, sopranos, Charles Brett and Marc-Angelo Messana, counter-tenors, Richard Morton and Alastair Thompson, tenors, David Wilson-Johnson, bass. Erato, 2292-45136-2, 1978 (Recording in October 1976 and January 1977, Henry Wood Hall - London.
- Haendel : Athalia, Kammerorchester Basel, Vocalconsort Berlin, conductors Paul Goodwin, with Geraldine McGreevy and Nuria Rial, sopranos, Lawrence Zazzo, counter-tenor, Charles Daniels, tenor, Deutsche HM, 88697723172, 2010.
- Franz Schubert, Winterreise, David Wilson-Johnson, David Owen Norris, piano. (Hyperion A66111) 1984
- Arthur Somervell,Songs, David Wilson-Johnson (Hyperion CDA 66187)1986
- Johann Sebastian Bach : Weltliche Kantaten, Gustav Leonhardt, Label Philips / 442 779-2; Produktionsjahr 1995.
- Percy Grainger, Songs, David Wilson-Johnson, David Owen Norris, piano. (Pearl SHE 572).
- Gerald Finzi, Songs, David Wilson-Johnson, David Owen Norris, piano. (GMN CO116)1996
- Roger Quilter, Songs, David Wilson-Johnson, David Owen Norris, piano. (Hyperion A 66208).
- Roger Quilter : Folk-Song Arrangements / Part-Songs for Women's Voices (Complete) (English Song, Vol. 11); David Wilson-Johnson; David Owen Norris, piano. ℗ 2005 Naxos, Naxos 8.557495.
- Haydn : Die Schopfung (The Creation, Salzburger Bachchor. Released: Jan 2005, Label: Oehms Classics.
- Berlioz : L'Enfance du Christ, David Wilson-Johnson, Mireille Delunsch, Tsuji, Dazeley, Salzburg Mozarteum Orchestra, Bolton. Released: Jan 2007, Label: Oehms Classics.
- Trevor Hold, Song Cycles, Amanda Pitt, David Wilson-Johnson*, David Owen Norris, piano.(Dutton CDLX 7213) 2008
- Beethoven : Symphony No.9, Christiane Oelze, Ingeborg Danz, Christoph Strehl, David Wilson-Johnson, Collegium Vocale Gent Royal Flemish Philharmonic, conducted by Philippe Herreweghe, Pentatone Classics, 2010.
- Berlioz : Béatrice et Bénédict, Laurent Naouri, David Wilson-Johnson, Susan Gritton, Kenneth Tarver, London Symphony Orchestra, Sir Colin Davis, LSO live.
- Elgar : The Dream of Gerontius op. 38. Avec Lilli Katriina Paasikivi-Ilves, Mark Tucker and David Wilson-Johnson (baritone); the Sydney Symphony Orchestra : direction, Vladimir Ashkenazy. Nominated for an ARIA Award in 2012.

David Wilson-Johnson has made over 250 CDs.
