= Martin Roscoe =

English classical pianist (born 1952)

- Born: 3 August 1952 (age 73); Runcorn, Cheshire, England
- Education: Royal Manchester College of Music
- Genres: Classical music
- Occupations: Pianist; Educator
- Award: Sydney International Piano Competition

Martin Roscoe (born 3 August 1952) is an English classical pianist. He performs as a concerto soloist, as a recitalist and as a chamber musician.

== Early life ==
Martin Roscoe was born in Halton, Runcorn, Cheshire. He first became serious about music at the age of seven after being "bowled over" by a performance at The Proms of the Symphonie Fantastique by Berlioz on 19 August 1959. He later went on to study at the Royal Manchester College of Music with Gordon Green and Marjorie Clementi.

Awards he won early in his career included the Davas Gold Medal in 1973, the Silver Medal of the Worshipful Company of Musicians in 1974, the British Liszt Piano Competition in 1976 and he was a prizewinner in the Sydney International Piano Competition in 1981.

== Career ==
Roscoe has developed close links with the Royal Liverpool Philharmonic Orchestra, the BBC National Orchestra of Wales and the Manchester Camerata. He has played as a soloist under many of the world's leading conductors, including Simon Rattle, Kent Nagano, Libor Pešek, Luciano Berio, Yan Pascal Tortelier, Andrew Litton and Mark Wigglesworth. Roscoe gives regular recitals at the Wigmore Hall. Roscoe has appeared in BBC Henry Wood Promenade Concerts on six occasions and has made more than 300 broadcasts with the BBC. He has an international reputation and has played in many countries, including Hong Kong, Singapore, Spain, Switzerland, South America, Australia, USA and France.

As a student, he formed a piano duo with Peter Donohoe and they have performed and made recordings together since. Their recording of music by Gershwin on Carlton Classics was chosen as Editor's Choice in the August 1997 issue of Gramophone. As a chamber musician he has performed with Tasmin Little, Emma Johnson, Steven Isserlis, Michael Collins, Steven Osborne, the Leopold String Trio and the Chilingirian, Vanbrugh, Tale, Schidlof, Carmina, Brodsky, Endellion and Sorrel String Quartets. The details of Roscoe's recordings are shown in the table below.

Before becoming a teacher at the Guildhall School of Music & Drama, Roscoe had held positions at the Royal Northern College of Music and the Royal Academy of Music. He is the artistic director of the Beverley Chamber Music Festival and the Ribble Valley International Piano Week. He has been granted an honorary Doctorate of Music by the University of Hull.

== Discography ==
Year	Title	Composer	Record Company	Reference	Other artistes
1977	Silentium	Arvo Pärt	EMI Classics	5624342	
1993	Piano Concerto No 1 in E minor, Op. 5 Piano Concerto No 2 in B minor, Op. 42	Dohnányi	Hyperion	CDA66684	BBC Scottish Symphony Orchestra
1993	Rodeo: Four Dance Episodes	Copland	ASV Platinum	PLT 8504	Michael Collins, clarinet Vanbrugh Quartet
1994	Dolly Suite Souvenirs de Bayreuth	Fauré	Hyperion	CDA66911/4	Kathryn Stott, piano
1994	Dance Suite, Op. 28; Piano Concerto, Op. 26; Variations, Op. 36	Bernard Stevens	Marco Polo	8.223480	Ireland National Symphony Orchestra
1994	Fratres (1980); Spiegel im Spiegel	Arvo Pärt	EMI Classics for Pleasure	5758052	Tasmin Little, violin
1995	Piano Works, Volume 1	Szymanowski	Naxos	8.553016	
1995	Quintet for Piano and Strings, Op. 67 Trio for Piano and Strings; Sonata for Viola/Cello and Piano	Amy Beach; Rebecca Clarke Rebecca Clarke	ASV	932	Endellion String Quartet
1996	Piano Works, Volume 2	Szymanowski	Naxos	8.553300	
1996	Piano Works, Volume 3	Szymanowski	Naxos	8.553867	
1997	Rhapsody in Blue; Porgy and Bess Fantasia	Gershwin	Carlton Classics	30368 01297	Peter Donohoe, piano
1998	Piano Concerto No 1 in F major, Op. 10; Piano Concerto No 2 in C major, Op. 24	Ignaz Brüll	Hyperion	CDA67069	BBC Scottish Symphony Orchestra
1998	Piano Sonatas	Clementi	CRD Records	CRD 3500	
1998	Violin Sonata in E minor Violin Sonata No. 2 in D minor	Elgar; Bax	Global Music Network	GMNC 0113	Tasmin Little, violin
1998	Works for cello and piano	Rachmaninoff	Black Box	BBM1044	Moray Welsh, cello
2001	Peacock Pie	Various	Hyperion	CDA67316	Guildhall Strings
2001	Piano Concerto in B flat minor, Op. 27; Piano Concerto in B flat major, Op. 30	Robert Fuchs; Friedrich Kiel	Hyperion	CDA67354	BBC Scottish Symphony Orchestra
2002	Concerto for two pianos and orchestra	Bliss	Naxos	8.557146	Peter Donohoe, piano Royal Scottish National Orchestra
2002	Music for two pianos	Rachmaninoff	Naxos	8.557062	Peter Donohoe, piano
2002	The Berserking	James MacMillan	Chandos	CHAN 10092	BBC Philharmonic
2002	Warsaw Concerto from Dangerous Moonlight	Richard Addinsell (arr. Roy Douglas)	Chandos	CHAN 10046	BBC Philharmonic
2003	Visions de l'Amen	Messiaen	Hyperion	CDA67366	Steven Osborne, piano
2003	Piano transcriptions	Bach, transcribed Samuil Feinberg	Hyperion	CDA67468	
2003	Phantasy, Piano Quartet in F♯ minor	Bridge	Naxos	8.557283	Maggini Quartet
2003	Piano Works, Volume 4	Szymanowski	Naxos	8.557168	
2004	From The Unforgettable Year 1919	Shostakovich	Chandos	CHAN 10361	BBC Philharmonic
2005	Piano Quintet, Op. 57	Shostakovich	Chandos	CHAN 10329	Sorrel Quartet
2005	Ballade No. 1 Ballade; Kreisleriana	Chopin; Robert Keeley; Schumann	Dunelm	DRD0247	
2006	Music for two pianos	Bax	Naxos	8.570413	Ashley Wass, piano
2006	Violin Sonata in D, Op. 12, No 1 Violin Sonata in C minor, Op. 30, No. 2 Violin Sonata in G, Op. 96	Beethoven	ASV Gold	GLD4023	Peter Cropper, violin
2011	Highland Concerto; Normandy (Symphonic Variations) Concertstück	Somervell & Cowen	Hyperion Records	CDA67837	BBC Scottish Symphony Orchestra
