= Violin Concerto in G minor =

Violin Concerto in G minor may refer to:

- Violin Concerto No. 1 (Bruch)
- Violin Concerto (Somervell)
- Violin Concerto No. 2 (Prokofiev)
