= Double Violin Concerto =

Double Violin Concerto may refer to:

- Concerto for Two Violins and String Orchestra, Op. 77 by Malcolm Arnold
- Concerto for Two Violins in D minor, BWV 1043 by Johann Sebastian Bach
- Double Concerto for Two Violins and Orchestra, Op. 49 by Gustav Holst
- Concerto for Two Violins and Orchestra by Karl Marx
