= Adila Fachiri =

Hungarian violinist (1886–1962)

Adila Fachiri (26 February 1886 – 15 December 1962) was a Hungarian violinist who had an international career but made her home in England. She was the sister of the violinist Jelly d'Arányi, with whom she often played duets.

Born Adila Arányi de Hunyadvár in Budapest, her early musical education was at the Royal Academy of Music in Budapest. She began to study violin under Jenő Hubay when she was ten years old. At the age of 17, she won the artists' diploma, the highest musical distinction in Hungary. She was a great-niece of Joseph Joachim, and she studied with him in Berlin until his death, being possibly the only private pupil he ever accepted. He bequeathed to her one of his Stradivarius violins.

She first went to England in 1909, and in 1915, she married Alexander Fachiri, an English barrister living in London. By 1924, she had played in public in Hungary, Austria, Germany, Italy, France and the Netherlands, as well as appearing regularly at London concerts. One of her preferred accompanists was the pianist Julie Lasdun, mother of architect Denys Lasdun.

Adila Fachiri made a recording of the Beethoven 10th violin sonata with Donald Tovey. She was the dedicatee of the 1930 violin concerto by Sir Arthur Somervell.

On 3 April 1930 she and her sister gave the first performance of the Concerto for Two Violins of Gustav Holst, at a Royal Philharmonic concert at the Queen's Hall, under the direction of Oskar Fried. Holst wrote the concerto for them.

In March 1933, the sisters were involved in a spiritualistic séance in London, at which the existence of Robert Schumann's Violin Concerto in D minor was revealed to them through the 'voices' of Schumann himself and of their late grand-uncle, Joachim.

She died in 1962, aged 73.

== Sources ==
- A. Eaglefield-Hull, A Dictionary of Modern Music and Musicians (Dent, London 1924)
- R. Elkin, Royal Philharmonic (Rider & co., London 1946).
- J. MacLeod, The Sisters d'Aranyi (Allen & Unwin, London 1969). ISBN 9780047800153
- R. Magidoff, Yehudi Menuhin, The Story of the Man and the Musician (Robert Hale, London 1956)
