= Irving S. Gilmore =

American philanthropist and arts patron

Irving Samuel Gilmore (1900–1986) was a musician, retail businessman, and philanthropist. He worked at and eventually led the Gilmore Brothers department stores business established by his uncle and father.

He was the youngest son of James F. Gilmore (1857–1908) and Carrie Maria Sherwood Gilmore Upjohn (1866–1953). His older brothers were James Stanley Gilmore (1890–1982) and Donald S. Gilmore. His father immigrated to the United States from Belfast, Ireland.

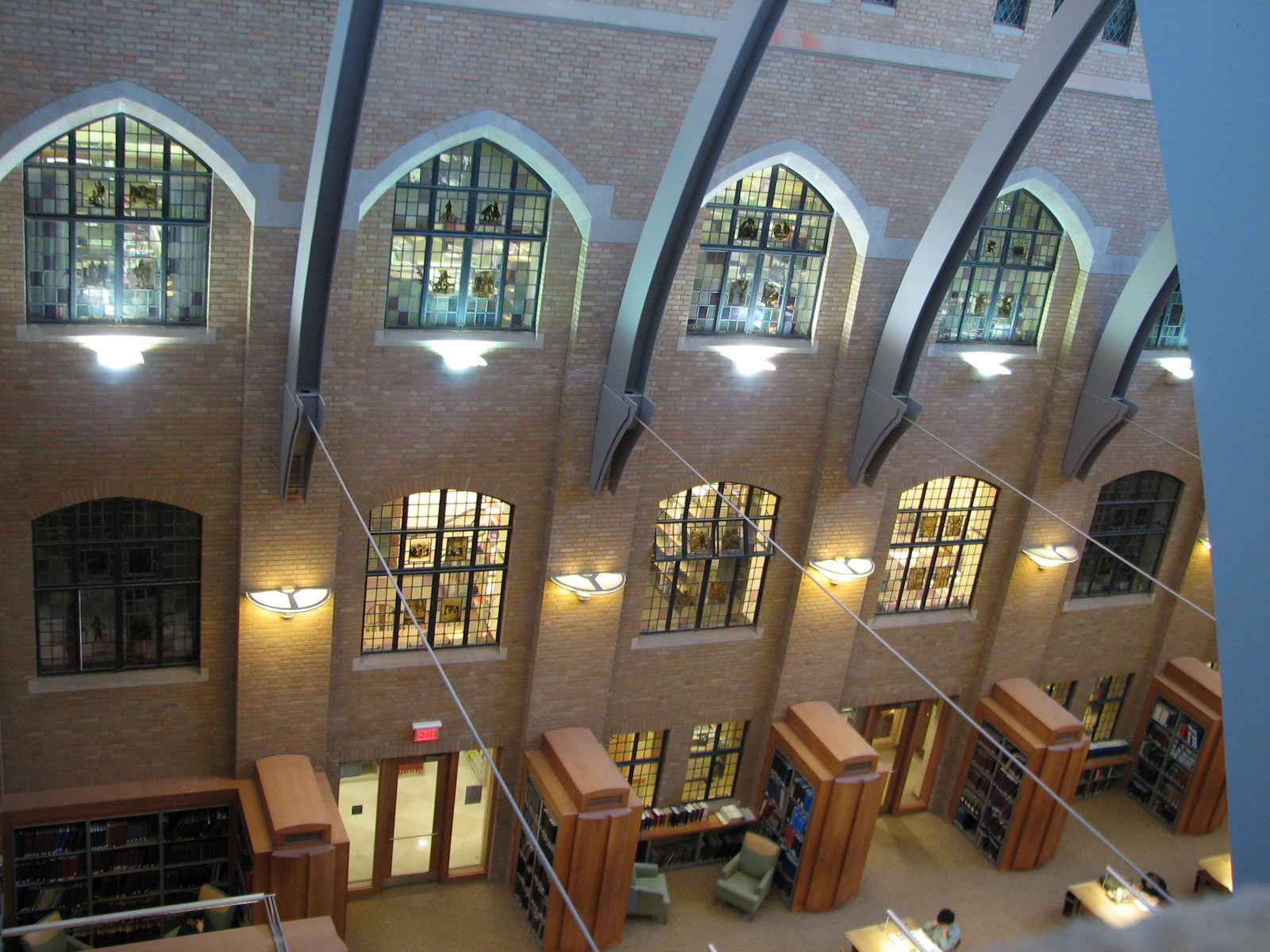
Irving S. Gilmore Library at Yale

He attended Kalamazoo High School and Lawrenceville School in Lawrenceville, New Jersey. He graduated from Yale University with a music degree. He supported the Kalamazoo Symphony. He also funded the city's annual Christmas parade.

Gilmore lived in Kalamazoo. His home at 530 West South Street in Kalamazoo is now part of the South Street Historic District and was for sale in 2021.

== Legacy ==
The Irving S. Gilmore Foundation he established has granted more than $30 million since the mid-1980s including $2 million to help fund the Irving S. Gilmore Theatre Complex, $4 million to create the Irving S. Gilmore Fine Arts Equipment Endowment, $2 million to support the Virtual Imaging Technology Lab initiative and a dance studio located atop Dunbar Hall, and $3.5 million in to create the Center for Advancing Arts Research (CFAAR), a laboratory and immersive experiences venue. Western Michigan University's music school is named for him. and it has a theater named for him. The Irving S. Gilmore Keyboard Festival (now called the Irving S. Gilmore International Piano Festival) is named for him as is the Irving S. Gilmore Music Library at Yale Music School. Irving's Market was also named for him.

The Kalamazoo Valley Museum has photographs of him and other business leaders from the community who were involved in planning the downtown mall.
