= Jelly d'Arányi =

Hungarian violinist (1893–1966)

Jelly d'Aranyi
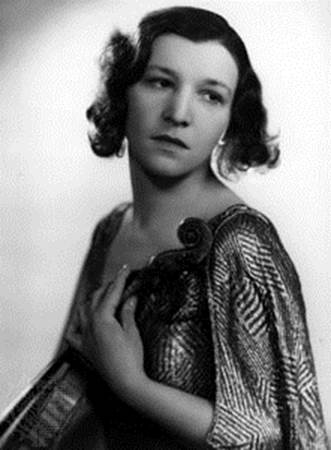
- Jelly d'Aranyi in 1923

Background information
- Born: Jelly Aranyi de Hunyadvár; 30 May 1893; Budapest, Austria-Hungary
- Died: 30 March 1966 (aged 72) Florence, Italy
- Genre: Classical
- Occupation: Violinist
- Instrument: Violin

Jelly d'Aranyi, fully Jelly Aranyi de Hunyadvár (Hungarian: Hunyadvári Aranyi Jelly) (30 May 1893 – 30 March 1966) was a Hungarian violinist who made her home in London. The great-niece of Joseph Joachim and sister of violinist Adila Fachiri, she became one of the leading violinists of her generation. After studying at the Franz Liszt Academy of Music in Budapest, she established herself as a prominent chamber musician and soloist, forming notable collaborations with Pablo Casals and Frederick Septimus Kelly. Several major composers dedicated works to her, including Béla Bartók's two violin sonatas, Maurice Ravel's Tzigane, Ralph Vaughan Williams' Concerto Accademico, and Gustav Holst's Double Concerto for Two Violins. She played an unusual role in the discovery of Robert Schumann's lost Violin Concerto through a séance in 1933.

== Early life and education ==
D'Aranyi was born in Budapest, the great-niece of Joseph Joachim and sister of the violinist Adila Fachiri, with whom she often played duets. She began her studies as a pianist, but switched to violin at the Music Academy in Budapest when Jenő Hubay accepted her as a student.

== Career ==
After concert tours of Europe and America as a soloist and chamber musician d'Aranyi settled in London. She formed a notable chamber trio with the Spanish cellist Pablo Casals and the Australian pianist Frederick Septimus Kelly, with whom she was in love, even referring to him as her "fiancé". On memorable occasions, she and Béla Bartók gave sonata recitals together in London and Paris. His two sonatas for violin and piano were dedicated to her; Jelly and Bartók presented them in London in March 1922 (No. 1) and May 1923 (No. 2).

She was an excellent interpreter of Classical, Romantic and modern music. After d'Aranyi had, at his request, played "gypsy" violin music to him one evening, Maurice Ravel dedicated his popular violin-and-piano composition Tzigane to her. Again at his request, she gave the first British performance of the Sonata for Violin and Cello in 1922. Ralph Vaughan Williams dedicated his Concerto Accademico to her. Gustav Holst's Double Concerto for Two Violins was written for Jelly and Adila.

D'Aranyi played a curious role in the emergence and 1937 world premiere of Robert Schumann's Violin Concerto. On the basis of messages she received at a 1933 séance, allegedly from Schumann himself, about this concerto of which she had never previously heard, she claimed the right to perform it publicly for the first time. That was not to be, but she did perform it at the London premiere.

== Personal life ==
From her 20s, d'Aranyi was a lifelong friend of Georgie Hyde-Lees, the wife of W. B. Yeats.

She died in Florence in 1966, aged 72.

== Legacy ==
The D'Aranyi String Quartet is named after d'Aranyi. The Bourjois perfume "Printemps de Paris" invented by Constantin Weriguine in 1931 was named for her.

Elgar's Tenth Muse, a 1996 television movie, depicts a tentative relationship between the widowed Edward Elgar (James Fox) and d'Arányi, played by Selma Alispahić.
