= Donald Gilmore =

American businessman and philanthropist

Donald Sherwood Gilmore (March 7, 1895 – December 21, 1979) was an American businessman and philanthropist.

== Personal life ==
Gilmore was the middle son of James F. Gilmore (1857–1908) and Carrie Maria Sherwood Gilmore Upjohn (1866–1953). His older brother was James Stanley Gilmore (1890–1982) and his younger brother was Irving Samuel Gilmore (1900–1986).

Gilmore graduated from The Lawrenceville School in New Jersey in 1916, after which he briefly attended Yale University.

In 1916, Gilmore married his step-sister, Genevieve Upjohn (1894–1990). His mother and her father, William Erastus “W.E.” Upjohn (1853–1932), married in 1913 after the deaths of their first spouses. Donald and Genevieve Upjohn Gilmore had three daughters: Carol Gilmore Boudeman (1917–1991), Jane Gilmore Maloney (1919–1996), and Martha Gilmore Parfet (1925–2017).,

Gilmore’s hobbies included silver work and collecting antique cars. In 1966, Gilmore established the Gilmore Car Museum, which as of 2023 contains over 400+automobiles and is open year-round.

== Career ==
Gilmore began his career in 1916 at Gilmore Brothers, the department store founded by his father and uncle in Kalamazoo, Michigan in 1881. Gilmore became a member of the department store’s board of directors in 1917.

In 1928, Gilmore’s brother-in-law, Harold Upjohn, then head of The Upjohn Company, died suddenly as a result of a post-surgical embolism. Losing his only son, Gilmore’s father-in-law (who was also his step-father), W.E. Upjohn, convinced Gilmore to join The Upjohn Company.

In 1929, Gilmore joined The Upjohn Company’s board of directors, and in 1930 he began a new career with the Company. Shortly before W.E. Upjohn’s death on October 18, 1932, Gilmore was made vice-president of the company. As vice-president, he oversaw the expansion of Upjohn Company branch offices from three to eleven, and dramatically expanded the company’s home office and plant operations.

In 1943, Gilmore became President and General Manager of The Upjohn Company. He guided the company through WWII and post-war building projects. Gilmore was responsible for bringing renowned Chicago-based architecture firm, Skidmore, Owings & Merrill, to Kalamazoo for the construction of Upjohn Company Corporate Headquarters (Building 88).

Gilmore’s greatest legacy is negotiating The Upjohn Company’s 1958 transition to a publicly traded company. On October 24, 1958, The Upjohn Company’s board of directors voted to recommend public ownership of the company. On December 11, 1958, the Board voted for a twenty-five to one stock split, and Gilmore negotiated a $45.00 price per share. On January 5, 1959, The Upjohn Company was “formally accepted for listing and trading on the New York Stock Exchange.”
