= Violin Concerto (Schumann) =

Composition by Robert Schumann

- by Robert Schumann
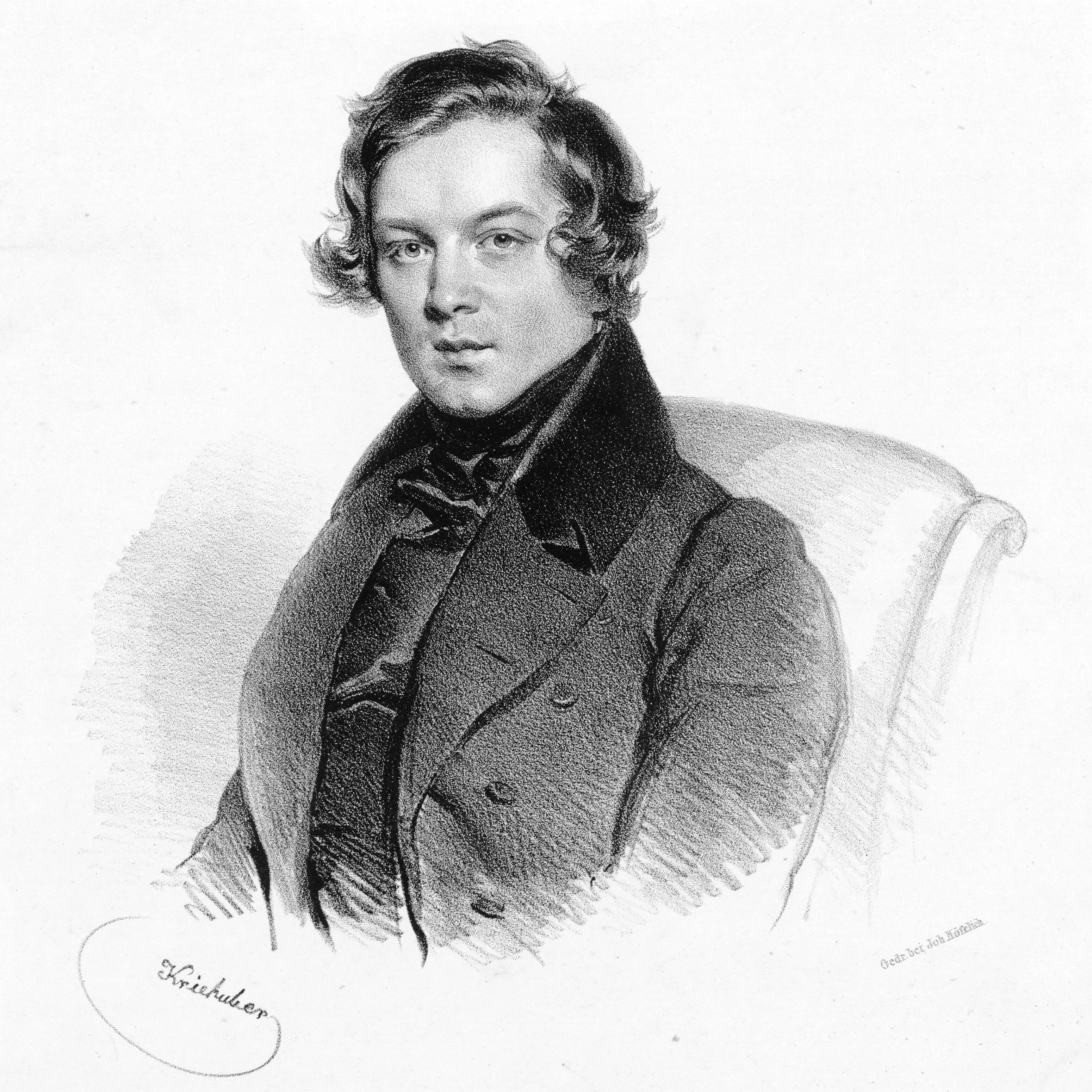
- Key: D minor
- Catalogue: WoO 23
- Composed: 1853
- Movements: Three
- Scoring: Violin and orchestra

Premiere
- Date: 26 November 1937
- Location: Berlin
- Performers: Georg Kulenkampff

Robert Schumann's Violin Concerto in D minor, WoO 23, written in 1853, was his only violin concerto and one of his last significant compositions. It remained unknown to all but a very small circle for more than 80 years after it was written.

== Music ==
The concerto is scored for solo violin, two flutes, two oboes, two clarinets in B♭, two bassoons, two horns in F, two trumpets in B♭, timpani, and strings.

External audio
- Performed by Joshua Bell with the Cleveland Orchestra under Christoph von Dohnányi
- I. In kräftigem, nicht zu schnellem Tempo
- II. Langsam
- III. Lebhaft, doch nicht schnell

The concerto is in the traditional three-movement quick-slow-quick form. It belongs less to the poetic and passionate style of Schumann's early masterpieces than to the more objective, classical manner of his later music, as ushered in by the Rhenish Symphony of 1850.

1. In kräftigem, nicht zu schnellem Tempo (D minor – D major)
2. Langsam (B♭ major)
3. Lebhaft, doch nicht schnell (D major)

The opening movement, which is in sonata form, is conceived more on symphonic than concertante lines. Its powerful opening subject dominates the proceedings, and although the violin’s role is extremely taxing, its subordination to a "symphonic" scheme is emphasized by the fact that there is no cadenza.

The second movement, in B♭, has the character of an intensely lyrical intermezzo, the theme of which hints toward the Geistervariationen WoO 24, and passes without pause into the third movement. Until its penultimate bar this movement uses no wind except bassoons and trumpet.

The third movement is a vigorous and dance-like sonata-rondo finale in the parallel major, D major, and has a strong polonaise rhythm.

== Composition ==
Schumann wrote it in Düsseldorf between 11 September and 3 October 1853 for the violinist Joseph Joachim. He had just previously completed another work for Joachim, the Fantasie in C major, Op. 131. On 1 October, the young Johannes Brahms entered Schumann's life. It appears that Schumann composed the finale of the Concerto in three days: 1–3 October, after making Brahms’s acquaintance. Later in October, he collaborated with his new friend Brahms and his pupil Albert Dietrich in the 'F-A-E' Sonata for violin and piano, also written for Joachim.

== Subsequent history and conflicting opinions ==
Though Joachim performed Schumann’s Fantasie, he never performed the Violin Concerto. After playing it through with the Hannover Court Orchestra (of which Joachim was the concertmaster) for Schumann in October 1853, Joachim retained the manuscript for the rest of his life. After Schumann’s attempted suicide in February 1854 and subsequent decline and death in a sanatorium in Endenich, Joachim evidently suspected the Concerto was a product of Schumann’s madness and thought of the music as morbid. Joachim’s biographer Andreas Moser reproduced a letter in which Joachim discussed Schumann’s Concerto as showing ‘a certain exhaustion, which attempts to wring out the last resources of spiritual energy’, though ‘certain individual passages bear witness to the deep feelings of the creative artist’.

Joachim’s opinion prevailed on the composer’s widow Clara and on Brahms, and the work was not published in the Complete Edition of Schumann’s works and was in effect kept secret throughout the 19th century. Brahms did however publish, in a supplementary volume of the Schumann Edition, ‘Schumann’s last musical thought’, a theme on which Schumann had begun to compose variations in early 1854. Schumann had thought the theme had been dictated to him by the spirits of Mendelssohn and Schubert, no longer recognizing that it was a melody he had used in the slow movement of the Violin Concerto. Brahms also wrote a set of piano-duet variations on this theme, his Opus 23.

=== Spirit voices ===
Joachim deposited the manuscript of the concerto with the Prussian State Library in Berlin, and stated in his will (he died in 1907) that the work should be neither played nor published until 100 years after the composer's death, i.e. until 1956. However in March 1933, during a spiritualist séance in London attended by Joachim's two great-nieces, the sister violinists Jelly d'Arányi and Adila Fachiri, a spirit-voice identifying himself as Robert Schumann requested Miss d'Aranyi to recover an unpublished work of his (of which she claimed to have no knowledge) and to perform it. In a second message, this time from the spirit of Joachim, they were directed to the Prussian State Library.

=== Menuhin's involvement ===
Yet no more was heard for four years, until in 1937 Schott Music, the music-publisher in Mainz, sent a copy of the score to Yehudi Menuhin asking for an opinion. He played it through with Hephzibah Menuhin, and reported to the conductor Vladimir Golschmann in July 1937 that it was the historically missing link of the violin literature. Menuhin planned to deliver the world premiere at San Francisco, and announced it for 3 October, but was interrupted by the appearance of Jelly d'Aranyi, who claimed the right of first performance for herself on the basis of the spiritualist messages.

=== First performances and recording ===
However, all of this was to no avail, for the world copyright to the concerto was held in Germany, and the German government insisted on the world premiere being given by a German. Georg Kulenkampff had worked on the score in some detail to render it playable, with Paul Hindemith (who, though his own works were now prohibited from performance in Germany, prepared the violin-piano reduction) and with Georg Schünemann, and it was Kulenkampff who gave the first performance, on 26 November 1937, with the Berlin Philharmonic. Kulenkampff recorded it soon after the first performance. Menuhin gave the second performance, in the piano version, accompanied by Ferguson Webster, at Carnegie Hall, New York, on 6 December 1937, and repeated this with the St Louis Symphony Orchestra under Golschmann on 23 December. Jelly d'Aranyi gave the first London performance, with the BBC Symphony Orchestra at the Queen's Hall.

The concerto slowly made its way into the concert repertoire and is now recognized as an important work of the composer. For a recording made in 1988 the Austrian violinist Thomas Zehetmair went back to Schumann’s original manuscript, correcting many errors in the published edition.

== Dietrich's concerto ==
Albert Dietrich, who must certainly have seen Schumann’s Violin Concerto in the month of its completion, composed a Violin Concerto of his own in 1874, intended for Joachim, which is in the same key (D minor); Dietrich's finale however uses polka rather than polonaise rhythms. It is possible that it was influenced by his private knowledge of the unperformed work (though Brahms's influence is easier to detect).

== Selected recordings ==
- Henryk Szeryng, London Symphony Orchestra, under Antal Doráti, Mercury, 1964
- Gidon Kremer, Philharmonia Orchestra of London, under Riccardo Muti, 1983
- Thomas Zehetmair, Philharmonia Orchestra, under Christoph Eschenbach, Teldec, 1989
- Gidon Kremer, Chamber Orchestra of Europe, under Nikolaus Harnoncourt, 1994 (live)
- Joshua Bell, The Cleveland Orchestra, Christoph von Dohnányi, 2005
- Isabelle Faust, Freiburger Barockorchester, under Pablo Heras-Casado, Harmonia Mundi, 2015
- Niek Baar, Deutsche Radio Philharmonie, Christoph Poppen, Channel Classics, 2024

== Sources ==
- Hans Gál, Schumann Orchestral Music (London: BBC Music Guides, 1979), 59–62. ISBN 9780563124238
- Clifton Helliwell, Music in the Air (Tabb House, Padstow 1989), pp. 87–89. ISBN 9780907018643
- R. Magidoff, Yehudi Menuhin: The Story of the Man and the Musician (Robert Hale, London 1956), 182–87.
- Erik Palmstierna, Horizons of Immortality (Constable and co., London 1937).
