= Piano Concerto (Somervell) =

Composition by Arthur Somervell

The Piano Concerto in A minor, "Highland" is a composition for piano and orchestra by Sir Arthur Somervell. it was the composer's second work for piano and orchestra following the Normandy Variations of 1913.

== Background ==
The concerto was composed by Somervell for pianist Jessie Munro, who first performed the work in 1921 in Guildford with the composer conducting the Claude Powell Orchestra. This was followed by a further performance in Bournemouth on 23 February 1922. Following this second performance the work fell into obscurity, with Somervell deciding not to publish the work, in contrast to his treatment of the later Violin Concerto.

The work was not performed again until Hyperion Records recorded it in 2011 as part of their "Romantic Piano Concerto" series with Martin Roscoe as the soloist paired with Martyn Brabbins and the BBC Scottish Symphony Orchestra.

== Movements ==
The concerto is in three movements:

1. Allegro moderato
2. Adagio
3. Allegro

A typical performance takes around 27 minutes.

== Reception ==
Reception of the concerto following its revival has been varied with most reviewers liking the work, Chang Tou Liang, writing in 2012 for the Straits Times, considered the work "...enjoyable..." and compared it with Bruch's Scottish Fantasy noting that the works "...original but highly folksy themes..." remained in memory after listening to it. Lee Passarella, writing in 2012 for the online magazine Audiophile Audition, echoed these comments and both writers suggested that the work could be substituted for Grieg's Piano Concerto in concert programs.

John France, writing for Musicweb International, like Liang & Passarella noted the works use of folk-like themes, but considered that while the work was "...a wee bitty full of ‘clichés.’" it was nevertheless something he would listen to again.

Jeremy Nicholas's comments in his 2011 Gramaphone magazine review echo those of Liang, Passarella and France, stating that the work was well worth reviving.

Andrew Clements, in his 2011 review in The Guardian considered the work unmemorable however.
