= Gilmore Car Museum =

Automobile collection and museum in Michigan, United States

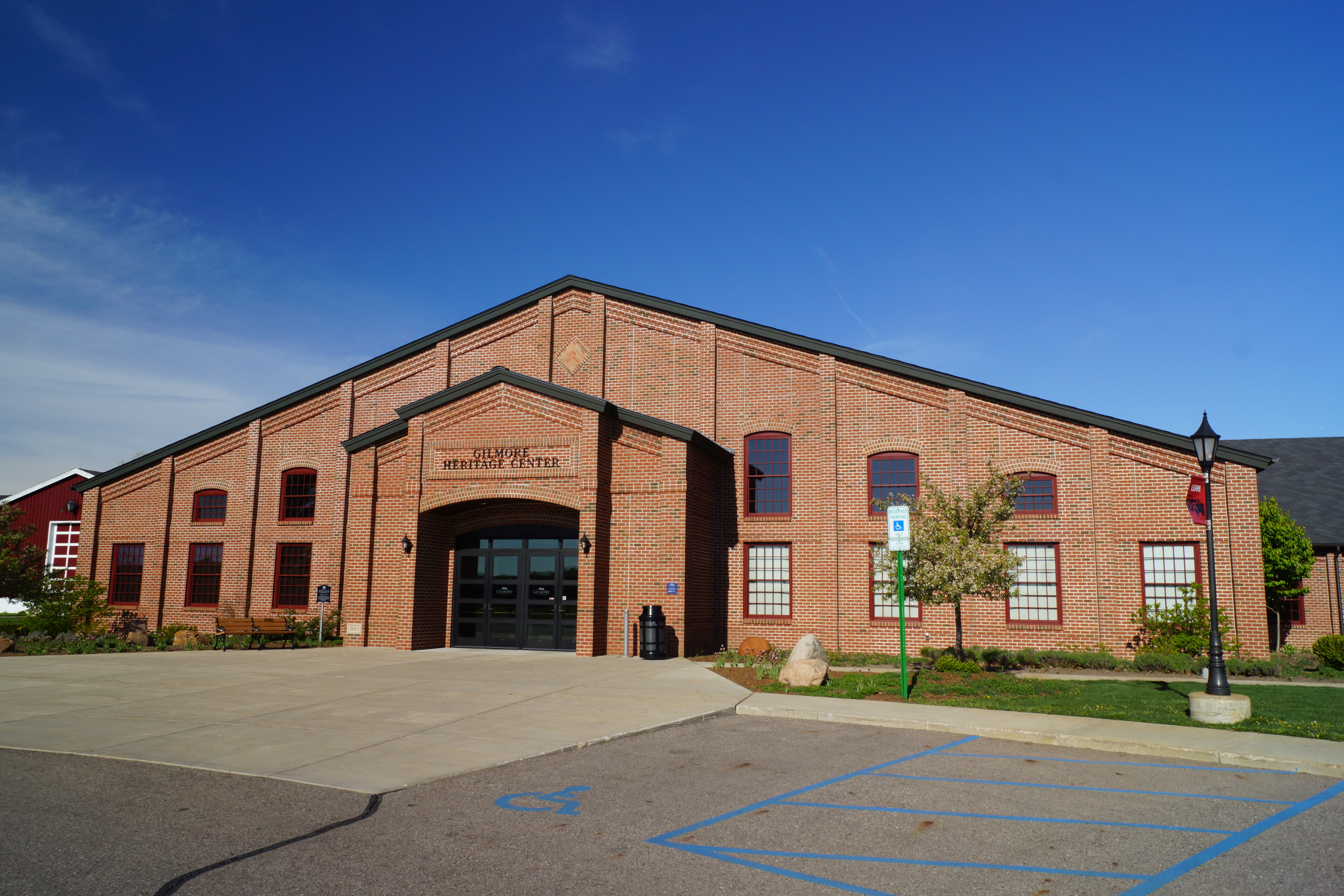
- Gilmore Heritage Center building
- Established: July 31, 1966; 60 years ago
- Location: 6865 W. Hickory Road, Hickory Corners, Michigan 49060
- Coordinates: 42.4405°N 85.4216°W
- Type: Automobile museum
- Collection size: 400+ antique cars, motorcycles, & more
- Visitors: 130,000 (annually)
- Founder: Donald S. Gilmore
- Website: gilmorecarmuseum.org

The Gilmore Car Museum is an automobile museum located in Hickory Corners, Michigan, United States. The museum exhibits over 400 vintage and collector vehicles and motorcycles from all eras in several buildings located on a 90-acre (36.4 ha) campus. The museum claims to be the largest automobile museum in North America. It is part of the MotorCities National Heritage Area.

== History ==
Donald S. Gilmore, a businessman, started collecting vintage vehicles in the early 1960s. His first vehicles included a 1927 Ford Model T and a 1913 Rolls Royce. Gilmore's interest in cars was initiated by the work needed to restore a 1920 Pierce-Arrow at his home on Gull Lake. He collected automobiles and needed more space, so he purchased 90 acres (36.4 ha) of land in southwestern Michigan. His wife, Genevieve, suggested turning the collection into a museum and they established a non-profit foundation. They opened the museum to the public on July 31, 1966 featuring 35 automobiles.

== Exhibits ==
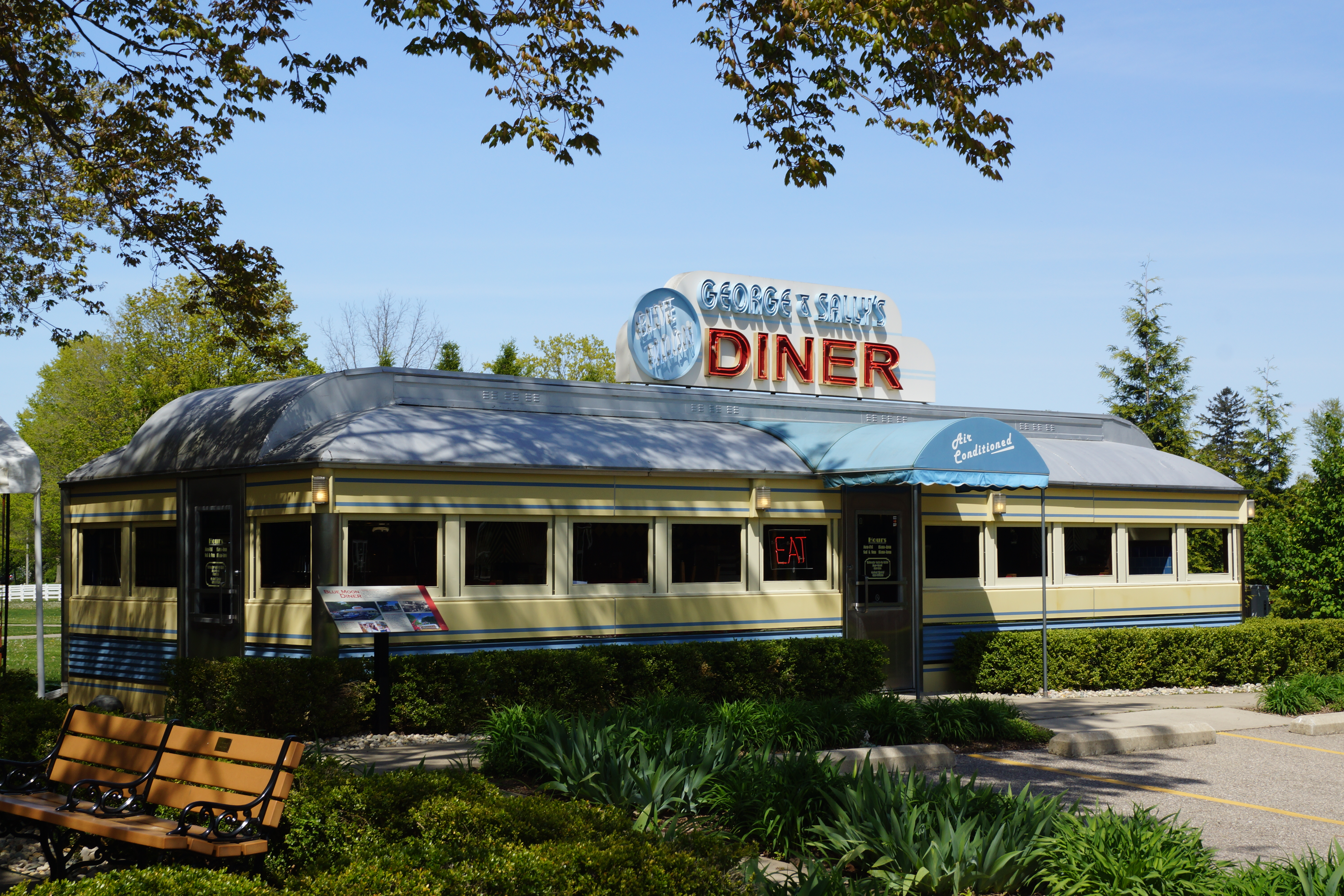
Diner at the Gilmore Car Museum

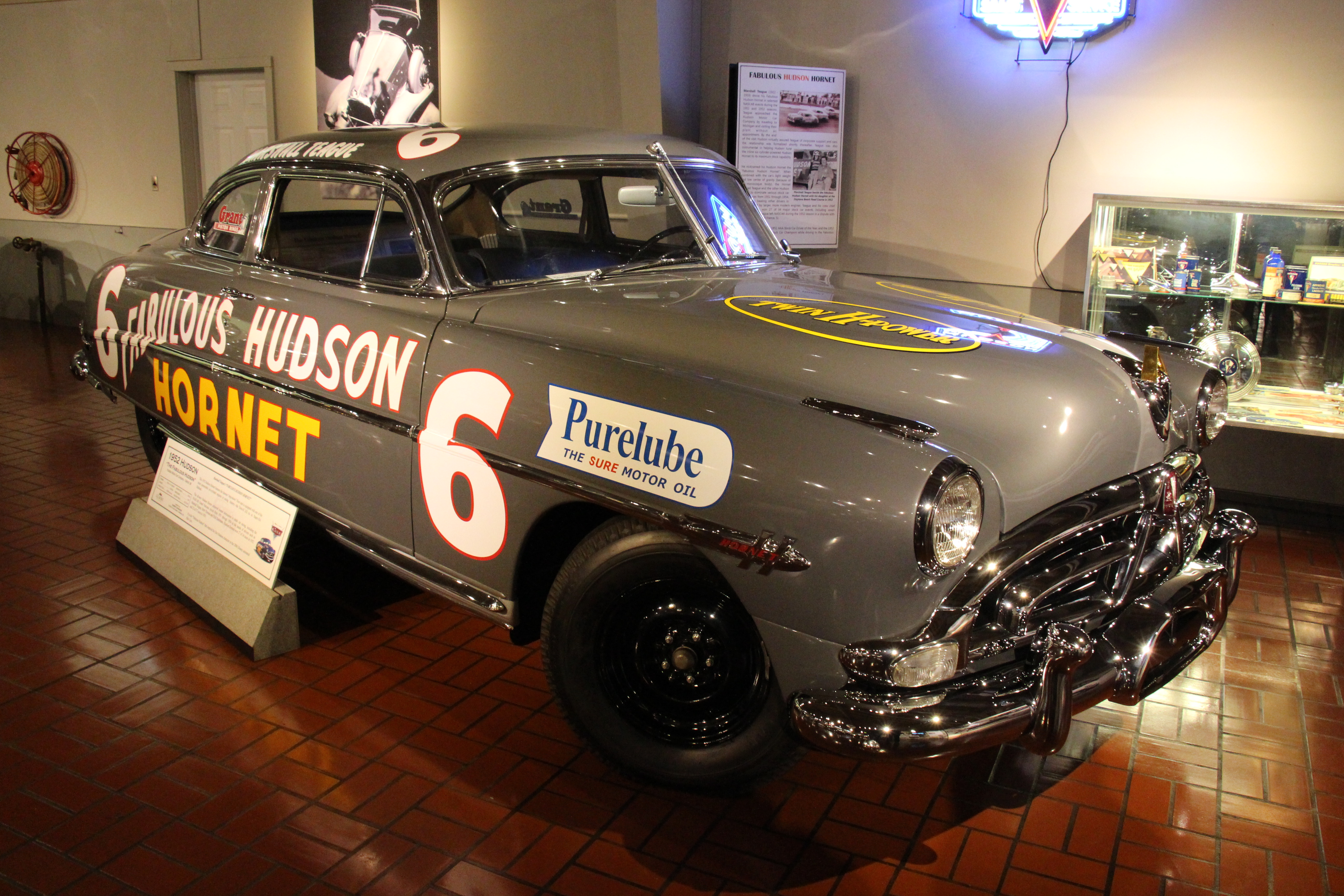
Hudson Hornet prepared by Smokey Yunick for Herb Thomas raced in NASCAR series

The museum's collection now consists of over 400 vehicles. These include a 1899 Locomobile powered by steam and a 1930 Rolls-Royce prop car used in the 1967 film The Gnome-Mobile. The movie car was donated by an admirer of Gilmore's collection, Walt Disney. In addition to automobiles, the displays also include racing cars, motorcycles, trucks, taxis, and engines. These include the Fabulous Hudson Hornet that dominated stock car racing from 1951 through 1954 and immortalized in the Cars movies, motorcycles such as the customized 1952 Triumph TR5 Trophy from the The Fonz and the Happy Days Gang TV series, and a 1954 Willys pickup descended from the Jeep of World War II fame.

Many exhibits rotate throughout the year. There are restored buildings to explore, special events throughout the year, and the venues are accessible.

The museum claims to have the largest display of automotive mascots and name badges in North America. The over 1,500 hood ornaments illustrate the evolution from utilitarian thermometers and radiator caps to corporate logos to symbols of the car itself. The campus includes a 1941 Blue Moon Diner, that was relocated from Meriden, Connecticut. There is also a replica 1930s Shell fuel station with a gallon of gas permanently fixed at 18 cents. The complex is one of North America's largest automobile museums with 190,00 square feet of exhibit space.

The museum offers a hands-on experience of driving simplistic Ford Model T vehicles that were built between 1908 and 1927.

Visitors during the summer months can take part in many events, including enthusiast car club shows.

== Partner museums ==
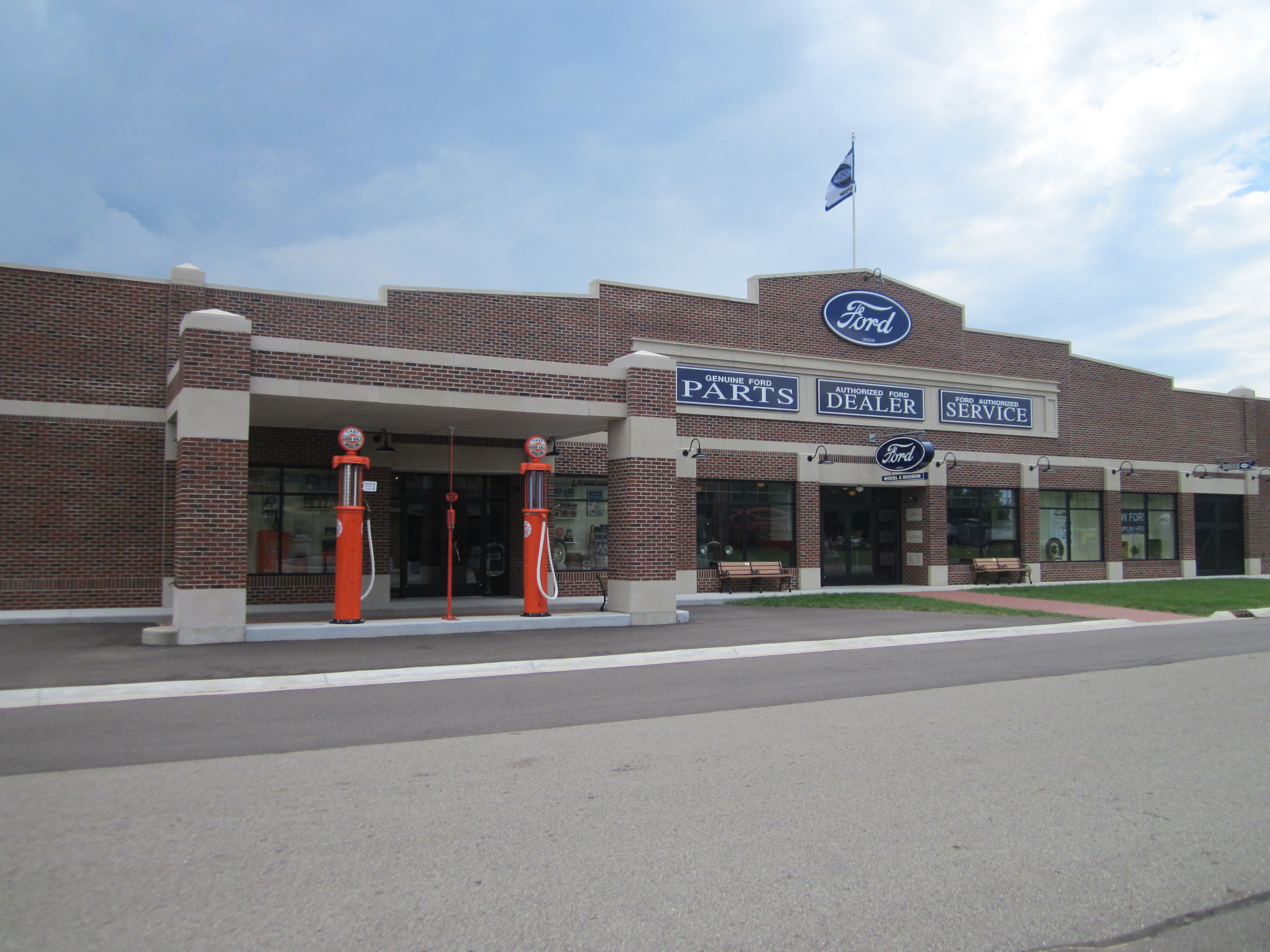
The Model A Ford Museum

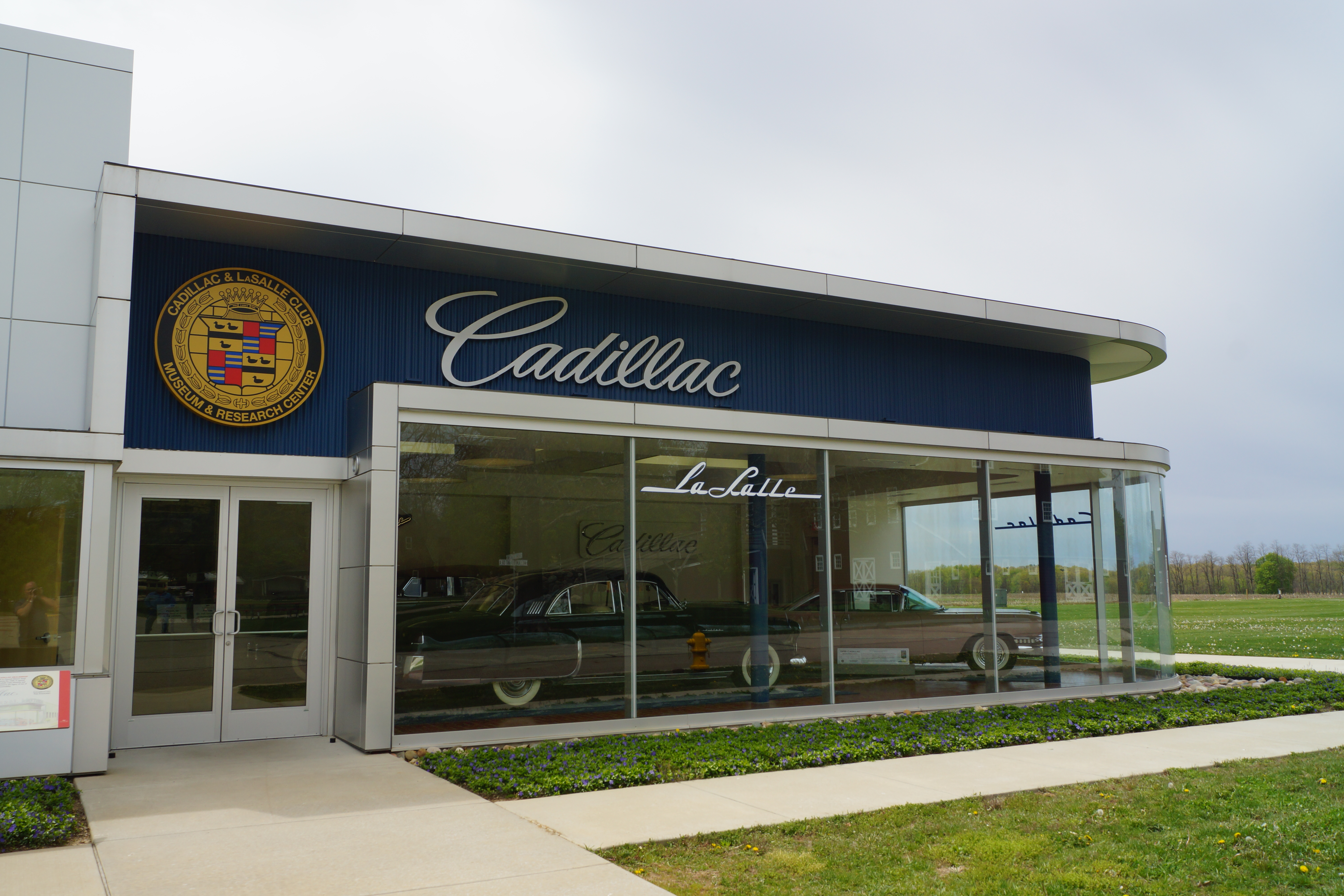
Cadillac dealership built to 1948 GM designs on the Gilmore campus

Seven smaller, independent museums are located on the Gilmore Car Museum campus:

- Classic Car Club of America Museum - all cars recognized by the CCCA as "Full Classics"
- Model A Ford Museum - the largest public museum dedicated to this model
- Lincoln Motor Car Heritage Museum - patterned after a historic Lincoln dealership
- Cadillac LaSalle Club Museum & Research Center - automobiles, display engines, and artifacts in a dealership building
- Pierce-Arrow Museum
- Franklin Automobile Collection - automobiles, engines, and artifacts from the H.H. Franklin Club
- Museum of the Horseless Carriage

The Midwest Miniatures Museum was established in 2007 in a farmhouse on the Gilmore campus until its relocation to Grand Haven, Michigan, and opened on November 6, 2021.

On July 8, 2026, the Gilmore Museum began a capital campaign and broke ground for a $3.6 million expansion project that will include expanding the "performance car gallery" as well as a new "education and engagement center" tailored for ages 5 to 15.
