= South Street Historic District (Kalamazoo, Michigan) =

- U.S. National Register of Historic Places
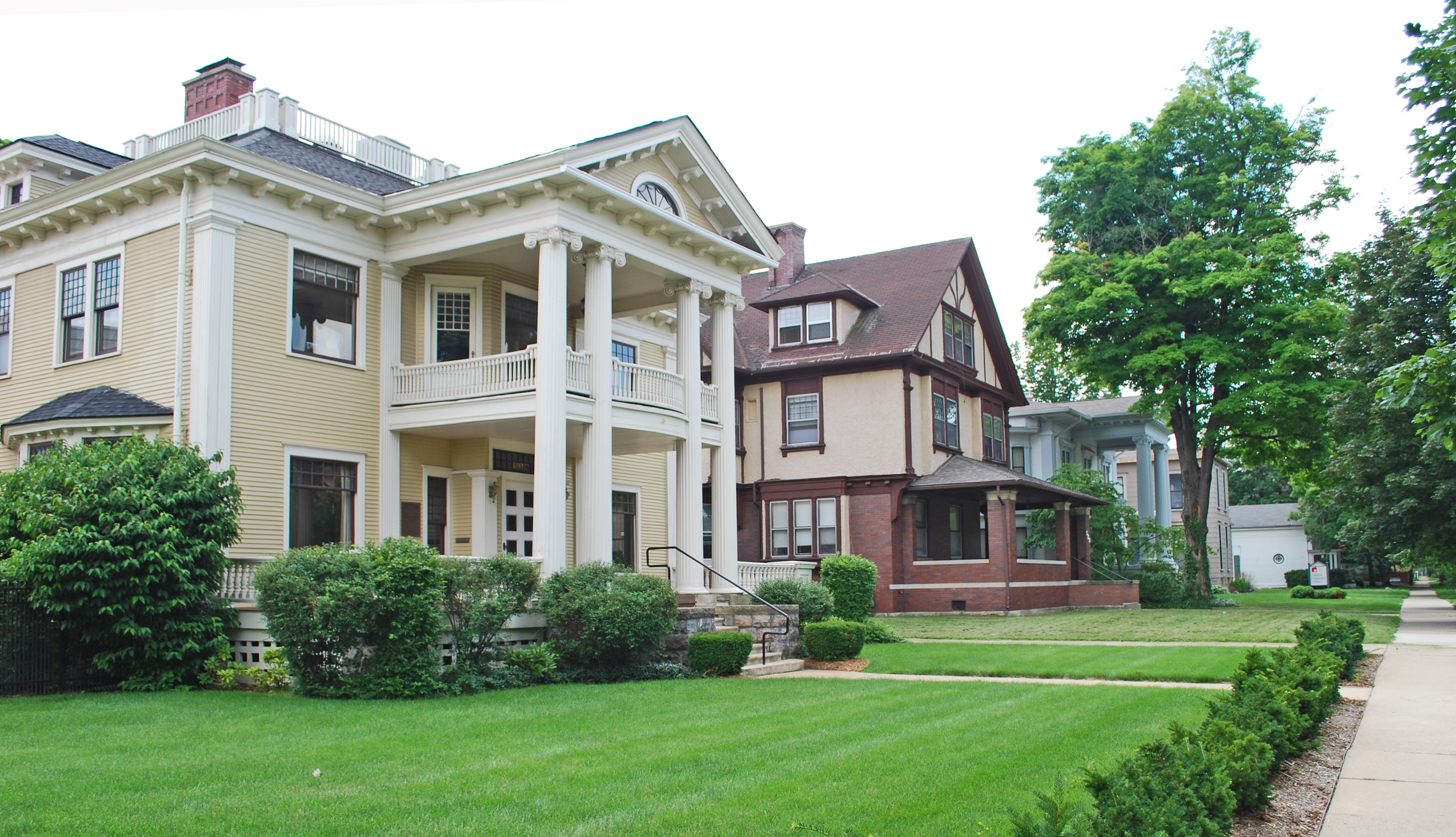

- Location within Michigan Location within the United States
- Interactive map
- Location: South St. between Oakland Dr. and Westnedge Ave., W. Lovell St. from Oakland Dr. to Pearl St., and Academy St. E of Oakland, Kalamazoo, Michigan
- Coordinates: 42°17′22″N 85°35′32″W
- Area: 27.9 acres (11.3 ha)
- Architectural style: Italianate, Gothic Revival, Queen Anne
- NRHP reference No.: 79001159 (original); 95000447 (increase)

Significant dates
- Added to NRHP: August 28, 1979
- Boundary increase: April 14, 1995

The South Street Historic District is a primarily residential historic district located along South Street between Oakland Drive and Westnedge Avenue, along West Lovell Street from Oakland Drive to Pearl Street, and Academy Street East of Oakland in Kalamazoo, Michigan. The portion of the district along South Street was listed on the National Register of Historic Places in 1979, and the remainder was listed in 1995.

== History ==
Kalamazoo was first settled in 1829, and the acreage that makes up the current South Street Historic District was platted in 1839. Most of the first plots were purchased by speculators, but in the later 1840s some modest Greek Revival houses were constructed in the district. In the 1850s and 1860s, the neighborhood rapidly became a fashionable and upscale place to live, and larger and more elegant houses appeared in the district as upper-class citizens moved in. Important local residents who lived in the district in the late 1800s included Allen Potter, the first mayor of Kalamazoo, Frank B. Lay, owner of the Michigan Buggy Company, Oscar K. Buckhout, a local produce wholesaler, and Albert M. Todd, owner of a large peppermint oil distilling company.

As the twentieth century progressed, some additional houses were constructed in the rear of what had been through-yards for the larger houses on South Street. In addition, several houses were converted to duplexes or apartments, and a few of the latest structures were built as duplexes. In the later 20th century, the district remained cohesive, as very few buildings were demolished or even significantly altered. The handful of post-1945 infill houses are consistent in scale with the remainder of the neighborhood. Preservation activities have ensured that the neighborhood retains its historic character.

== Description ==
The original portion of the South Street Historic District contains twenty-nine 19th- and early 20th-century single-family houses dating from the 1840s to the 1910s. Architectural styles range from Greek Revival and Gothic Revival to Italianate, Queen Anne, Georgian Revival, and English Tudor. many of the houses are large, and most possess considerable architectural merit.

The second portion of the district contains 87 single- and two-family houses. These are of the same architectural styles as the original South Street houses, but also include early 20th-century Prairie and Craftsman examples.
