= Trevor Hold =

British composer, poet and author (1939–2004)

Trevor Hold (21 September 1939 – 28 January 2004) was an English composer, poet and author, best known for his song cycles, many of them setting his own poetry.

== Biography ==
Born in Northampton, Hold suffered an attack of polio at the age of seven, which affected his left arm. Piano lessons were used as therapy, and this led to an early interest in writing for the piano. He also began writing poetry in his teens. Hold was educated at Northampton Grammar School (1950–57), and went on to study at the University of Nottingham, where he completed a first class honours in music, followed by an MA.

He became Head of Music at Market Harborough Grammar School, and from 1963–65 assistant lecturer in music at Aberystwyth University. From there he moved on to a lectureship in music at Liverpool University (1965–70). By this time he was already composing. After Liverpool, Hold settled with his family at Dovecote House in the village of Wadenhoe, East Northamptonshire, where he lived for over thirty years. For two decades he taught at the University of Leicester and became a central figure in the local music making of the East Midlands, composing and conducting for local choirs and orchestras, and teaching adult education classes. One of his students was the pianist David Owen Norris.

Hold took early retirement from Leicester in 1989 to concentrate on composing and writing. He died unexpectedly after contracting cancer in January 2004, aged 64.

== Music ==
An early success was the song cycle for soprano, baritone and chamber orchestra The Unreturning Spring (1962–3), setting seven poems by the wartime pilot- poet James Farrar, and showing the influence of Benjamin Britten. it was followed the next year by For John Clare (1964) for tenor and instrumental ensemble, the piece he considered to be his true opus 1. The poet John Clare, who lived in Northampton for over 20 years, was a major influence. Hold won the Clements Prize for his First String Quartet (1965) and the Royal Amateur Orchestral Society Prize for his overture My Uncle Silas (1967).

Although he generally made little effort to promote himself as a composer outside of his local area, contact with the BBC in Birmingham led to a series of broadcasts of his song cycles with leading performers, including Gathered from the Field (words John Clare, 1977) and cycles setting his own words such as The Image Stays (1979), River Songs (1982) and Book of Beasts (1984). He also set the poetry of e.e. cummings in the cycle I'll Sing (1988). He wrote very few separate songs. As the song cycles became more dramatic he turned increasingly to opera, most notably in The Second Death (1983).

The piano suite Kemp's Nine Daies Wonder was broadcast by John Ogdon in 1988, and became Hold's best known work for piano. There are also four piano sonatas, written during the last two years of his life and performed by Peter Jacobs. The chamber music includes two string quartets (1965, 1992), the Wind Quintet (1973–5), and the Clarinet Quintet (1983).

His orchestral works include two symphonies (1974–77 and 1993–5) and the Piano Concerto (1992). The broadcast premiere of his Symphony No 1 on 8 April 1988 by the BBC Philharmonic Orchestra conducted by Odaline de la Martinez gave him a rare moment on the national stage. The Symphony No. 2, Four Landscapes (1993-95), is a late example of a programme symphony.

=== Recordings ===
Recordings of three of the song cycles - The Image Stays, River Songs and Voices from the Orchard - are available, performed by David Wilson-Johnson (baritone), Amanda Pitt (soprano) and David Owen Norris (piano). Ailish Tynan (soprano) and Roderick Williams (baritone) have recorded The Unreturning Spring with the BBC Concert Orchestra. There are also two discs of the piano music, performed by Peter Jacobs.

== Poet and author ==
Aside from music, Hold's main interest was in natural history, and this influence can be seen in both his music and in the English pastoral sensibility of his poetry. (Like Messiaen, Hold was fascinated by the relationship between birdsong and music). His four poetry collections - Time And The Bell (1971), Caught In Amber (1981), Mermaids And Nightingales (1991) and Chasing The Moon (2001) show the influence of John Clare and his description of the Northamptonshire landscape in local dialect.

In 1978 Hold produced The Walled-in Garden, a short study of the songs of Roger Quilter. Towards the end of his life he published a full length study of English Romantic song, Parry To Finzi: 20 English Song Composers (2002).
