= Double Concerto (Holst) =

1930 work for two violins and orchestra, by the English composer

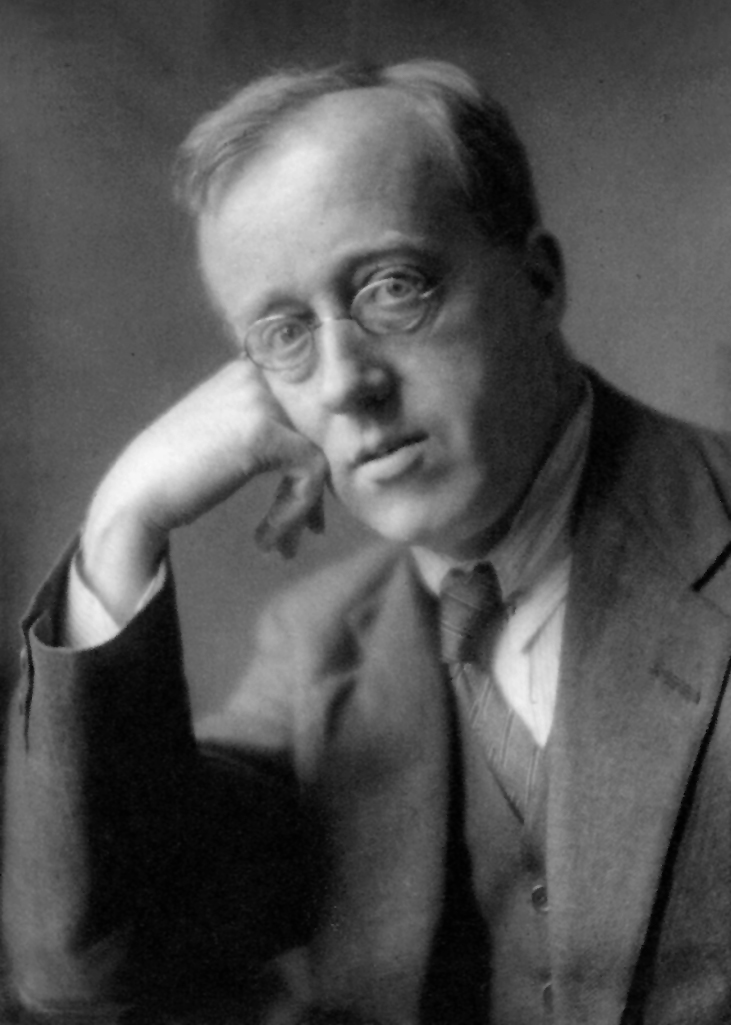
Gustav Holst ca. 1921

The Double Concerto for Two Violins and Orchestra (H. 175; Op. 49) is a work by Gustav Holst in three movements played without a break. It was written in 1929 and first performed in 1930 by its dedicatees, the sisters Adila Fachiri and Jelly d'Arányi. Though now praised by many critics, it has never been frequently performed in the concert hall. It is characterized by fugal counterpoint, folk-like melody, and bitonality without dissonance.

== Scoring ==
Apart from the soloists, the Double Concerto is scored for two flutes, two oboes, two clarinets in B♭, two bassoons, two horns in F, two trumpets in C, timpani, and strings. The 2nd flute, 2nd oboe, 2nd bassoon, 2nd horn, 2nd trumpet and timpani are cued in.

== Composition ==
On 21 September 1927, Holst heard the Bach Concerto for Two Violins performed at the Queen's Hall, the sisters Adila Fachiri and Jelly d'Arányi being the soloists. Though he had never been much tempted to produce solo concertos, he was now moved to consider a double violin concerto. Other commitments delayed this project for two years, but in August 1929 he began work, bringing it to a first completed sketch in September. In October, he gave the manuscript to Fachiri and d'Arányi for their consideration. Early in 1930, he rehearsed it with them at their studio.

== Significant performances ==
The Double Concerto was first performed by the dedicatees, Fachiri and d'Arányi, with the Royal Philharmonic Orchestra under Oskar Fried, at a Queen's Hall concert on 3 April 1930. Though the soloists were quite equal to the score's challenges, Fried's contribution was not well received; he was described in the press as "quite the least acceptable conductor heard at a London symphony orchestra concert for a long time". During the interval Holst was presented with the Royal Philharmonic Society's rarely-bestowed Gold Medal.

It was, many years later, performed along with The Planets and The Hymn of Jesus at the Royal Philharmonic Orchestra's Holst Centenary concert in 1974.

== Structure ==
The Double Concerto consists of three movements played without a break:

1. Scherzo
2. Lament
3. Variations on a Ground

The first movement, a scherzo, opens with an ostinato rhythm played by cello and double bass, to which a first theme is added by clarinets, bassoons and violas. A fugue is then begun as the first violin soloist, the second soloist, viola and cello enter one by one. Their counterpoint turns into a bitonal passage for the two soloists, then to a return of the first subject. The movement ends with the second soloist returning to a thematic element given earlier by the first, and the first reprising the second soloist's theme from the bitonal passage.

The second movement, a mostly bitonal Lament, comprises a melancholy theme in 5/4 reminiscent of late Shostakovich, played by the unaccompanied soloists. The orchestra with muted strings make a gradual entry, as if to soothe, but the melancholy mood continues to the end. This movement includes an extended passage taken from his earlier Terzetto for flute, oboe and viola.

The third movement is called Variations on a Ground. The first violin establishes the rather bumpy ground, the second takes it up, then the second violin plays pizzicato while the first accompanies it, and finally the second accompanies the pizzicato first violin. In these fast-changing passages there are displays of cross-rhythm and bitonality in 5/4 and 7/4 time.

== Reception ==
Initially, music critics were divided in their opinion of the Double Concerto. It was called "highly intellectualized", and even "absolutely threadbare", but the Daily Telegraph wrote that it was "completely satisfactory, for even at a first hearing the close relation between form and material is obvious", and noted that the second movement's melody had "moments of rare beauty" in spite of being "just a little heartless". Holsts's friends were encouraging. Ralph Vaughan Williams told him that "The Lament & Ground are splendid – I'm not quite so sure about the scherzo – and even that boils down to not being quite so sure about the 6/8 tune". R. O. Morris wrote that "You made your 2 keys sound like one key, and how otherwise should it be? Any fool can write in X^{n} keys and make it sound like X^{n} keys.

But the subtlety and detachment of the concerto puzzled audiences, who would have preferred Holst to carry on writing works along the lines of The Planets. It has over the years been an infrequently performed work, perhaps because it gives soloists no chance to display their virtuosity, or because a concerto only about 14 minutes long is hard to programme. In recent years, one critic has written that he found the Double Concerto "not a wholly satisfactory work: there is too much slow music, and the outer movements lose momentum through frequent changes of speed". Others, on the other hand, have described it as "striking...a fine example of Holst's later, sparer style", "a wonderful work, rhythmic and colourfully orchestrated", and as a fine example of "the art that conceals art. It is remarkable that the composer of The Planets was a composer of such subtlety." Paul Shoemaker called it "one of my very favorite of all Holst's works; it is amazing that it is not more frequently played."

== Editions ==
- Holst, Gustav (1930). Double Concerto for Two Violins and Orchestra. Op. 49. London: J. Curwen.
- Holst, Gustav (1973). Holst, Imogen (ed.). Double Concerto for Two Violins and Orchestra. Op. 49 (Revised ed.). London: Curwen. ISBN 0852490305.
- Holst, Gustav (1977). Holst, Imogen; Matthews, Colin (eds.). Collected Facsimile Edition of Autograph Manuscripts of the Published Works. Volume 2: Works for Small Orchestra. London: Faber Music. ISBN 9780571100088.

== Discography ==
- Emanuel Hurwitz, Kenneth Sillito (violins), English Chamber Orchestra, cond. Imogen Holst (1970). Double Concerto, Capriccio, Two Songs Without Words, Golden Goose Ballet Music (LP). Lyrita. SRCS 44.
- Andrew Watkinson, Nicholas Ward (violins), City of London Sinfonia, cond. Richard Hickox (1994). Holst: St Paul's Suite, Brook Green Suite, Double Concerto, A Fugal Concerto, Lyric Movement, Two Songs Without Words (CD). Chandos. CHAN 9270.
- Janice Graham, Sarah Ewins (violins), English Sinfonia, cond. Howard Griffiths (2007). Holst: Double Concerto, St Paul's Suite, Brook Green Suite (CD). Naxos. 8.570339.
