= Violin Concerto (Somervell) =

The Violin Concerto in G minor is a composition for violin and orchestra by Sir Arthur Somervell. In addition to being the composers second work for these forces following the Concertstück he had composed in 1913, it was also the composer's last major orchestral work.

== Background ==
The concerto was composed in 1930 by Somervell for violinist Adila Fachiri, the great-niece of violinist Joseph Joachim, who first performed the work in Edinburgh in 1932 supported by the Reid Orchestra under Mary Grierson, further performances, most notably featuring the BBC Symphony Orchestra under Adrian Boult followed in 1933.

It would appear that this success led the composer to choose, unlike his earlier Highland Concerto, to have the work published by Boosey & Co. in 1933.

Despite the initial success and publication, the work was not performed again after 1933 until Hyperion Records recorded it in 2004 as part of their "Romantic Violin Concerto" series with Anthony Marwood as the soloist paired with Martyn Brabbins and the BBC Scottish Symphony Orchestra.

== Movements ==
The concerto is in three movements:

1. Allegro moderato e con grazia
2. Adagio
3. Allegro giocoso

A typical performance takes around 33 minutes.
