= Arthur Somervell =

British composer and art song writer (1863-1937)

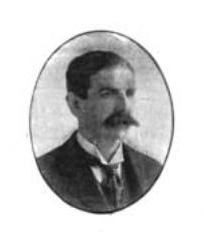
Somervell in 1896

Sir Arthur Somervell (5 June 1863 – 2 May 1937) was an English composer and educationalist. After Hubert Parry, he was one of the most successful and influential writers of art song in the English music renaissance of the 1890s–1900s. According to Michael Hurd, his most important work is found in the five song cycles, particularly his settings of Tennyson in Maud (1898) and Housman in A Shropshire Lad (1904).

== Career ==
He was born in Windermere, Westmorland, the son of Robert Miller Somervell and his wife. His father was a shoe manufacturer who served as a JP, of "Hazelthwaite" at Windermere (1821-1899). The Somervell (originally Somerville) family came from Scotland, settling in London in the 1700s.

Somervell's brother, Colin Somervell, became a shoe-manufacturer like their father and later served as High Sheriff of Westmorland in 1916. Colin's son, Maj. Arnold Colin Somervell, O.B.E., served in this office in 1936; later, other members of the Somervell family also served.

Somervell was initially educated at Uppingham School and King's College, Cambridge, where he studied composition under Sir Charles Villiers Stanford. From 1883 to 1885 he studied at the High School for Music, Berlin, and from 1885 to 1887 at the Royal College of Music in London, under Parry. He studied composition with Friedrich Kiel. He became a professor at the Royal College of Music in 1894, and conducted his own works at the Leeds and Birmingham Festivals, 1895-97.

In 1890 Somervell married Edith Lance Collet (1861-1944). There were four children: Viola Helen Antonia, Katharine Margaret, Hubert Arthur, and Ronald Arthur. Through their daughter Katherine ('Kit'), who became a dancer with Sergei Diaghilev's Ballets Russes, they were grandparents of writer Elizabeth Jane Howard.

Somervell was also influential in the field of music education. He worked for twenty-eight years as one of His Majesty's Inspectors of Schools (HMI), with special responsibility for the teaching of music. He was appointed Inspector of Music at the Board of Education and Scottish Education Department in 1901 (succeeding John Stainer). In June the following year he received the degree Doctor of Music from the University of Cambridge.

Somervell was knighted in 1929. After retirement he continued as Chairman of the School Orchestra Festivals, Queen's Hall, from 1932 until his death. He died at his home, 105 Clifton Hill, St John's Wood, aged 73. After he was cremated, his ashes were buried in the place of his birth, the Lake District, specifically within Grasmere Cemetery.

== Music ==
Somervell's style was conservative, and shows the influence of Mendelssohn and Brahms. He achieved success in his own day as a composer of choral works such as The Forsaken Merman (1895), Intimations of Immortality (which he conducted at Leeds Festival in 1907), and a short oratorio The Passion of Christ (1914). For a time this rivalled Stainer’s ubiquitous Crucifixion in popularity. His only symphony, Thalassa, was first performed in February 1913, and clearly follows on from the example of Brahms. The central ‘Lost in Action’ slow movement was regularly played as a stand-alone piece during the First World War. The Clarinet Quintet was first performed by Haydn Draper at the Wigmore Hall on 19 May, 1919, but received few other performances until the recent revival of interest. His Violin Concerto of 1930 was dedicated to the violinist Adila Fachiri. His popular Handel adaptation "Silent Worship" was featured in the 1996 film Emma.

Today he is chiefly remembered for his song cycles, such as Maud (after Tennyson, 1898) and the first known musical setting (1904) of A. E. Housman's A Shropshire Lad. Trevor Hold points out that Somervell had "a genuine, deep affection for literature", reflected in his wide and eclectic choice of texts. Maud was the first successful English song cycle, and "remains one of the masterpieces of English song". Stephen Banfield considers the Robert Browning cycle A Broken Arc (1923) his best, and 'The worst of it' his best song.

== Recordings ==
- The Violin Concerto in G minor (1930) received its first recording in 2005 by Anthony Marwood and the BBC Scottish Symphony Orchestra, conducted by Martyn Brabbins.
- The "Thalassa" Symphony in D minor (The Sea Symphony), received its world premiere recording in 2011 for Cameo Classics, nearly 100 years after its composition. Written in 1912, the second movement, 'Elegy', commemorates Robert Falcon Scott's death in the Antarctic that year. The Malta Philharmonic Orchestra was conducted by Michael Laus.
- The Piano Concerto (1921) and the Normandy Variations for piano and orchestra (1912) were recorded for Hyperion Records in 2011, with Martin Roscoe and the BBC Concert Orchestra under Martin Yates.
- Two conversations about Bach (1915) for two violins and piano received its premiere recording in 2015, by Rupert Marshall-Luck (both violins, double-tracked), and Matthew Rickard (piano).
- The Clarinet Quintet in G major (1913) was recorded by Stephan Siegenthaler and the Leipzig String Quartet on CPO in 2016.
- There are many recordings of A Shropshire Lad and Maud. But the lesser known song cycle A Broken Arc (setting Browning) from 1923 has also been recorded.

== Compositions ==
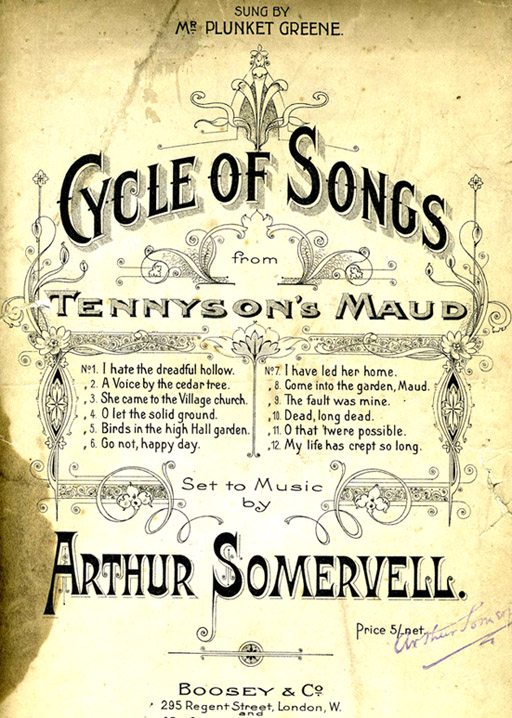
Titlepage of Somervell's 'Maud' cycle, Boosey & Co. 1898

=== Operettas ===
- The Enchanted Prince
- Princess Zara; Knave of Hearts (Novello)
- Golden Straw (Curwen)
- Thomas the Rhymer

=== Orchestral works ===
- Thalassa Symphony in D minor (1912) (Boosey)
- Helen of Kirconnel (Novello)
- In Arcady (Suite for small orchestra) (Donajowski)

=== Concertante works ===
- Normandy, symphonic variations for piano and orchestra (Augener, 1911)
- Concertstuck for violin and orchestra (Augener, 1913)
- Highland concerto in A minor for piano and orchestra (1920)
- Violin Concerto (1930).

=== Choral ===
- Mass
- Power of Sound
- The Charge of the Light Brigade
- Elegy (Chorus and orch.) (Novello)
- Song of Praise (chorus and orch.) (Metzler)
- To the Vanguard; Passion of Christ (chorus and orch.) (Boosey)
- Mass in D minor (Ricordi).
- Windermere a tune to the hymn 'O Lord our God, arise!'

=== Chamber music ===
- Quintet for clarinet and strings
- Suites, studies and pieces for violin and piano (Augener, Weekes, Williams and Ashdown)
- Variations for 2 pianos (Augener)

=== Songs ===
- Six songs by Robert Burns (1885–86)
- Maud Cycle (1898)
- Four songs of Innocence (1899)
- Singing Time, songs for small children (1899)
- Love in Springtime Cycle (1901). (Boosey)
- A Shropshire Lad Cycle (1904)
- James Lee's Wife Cycle (1908)
- A Broken Arc Cycle (1923)
- Windflowers, Cycle for vocal quartet (Boosey).

=== Musical education works ===
- Rhythmic Gradus for pianoforte (Bosworth)
- Exercises in sight-reading, etc. (Curwen)
- School of Melody, 10 Progressive Tunes for viola and piano (1919): (Augener)
- Sight-reading, 6 vols (Swan)
- Sight-reading exercises (Augener)
- Charts of the rules of Harmony and Counterpoint (Clarendon press)

== Sources ==
- A. Eaglefield-Hull (Ed.), A Dictionary of Modern Music and Musicians (Dent, London 1924).
- T. Holt, Parry to Finzi: Twenty English Song-Composers (Boydell Press, Woodbridge 2002), 87-101.
- K. Shenton, 'Sir Arthur Somervell', in British Music Society Journal 9 (1987), 45-54.
