= Jacques Herbillon =

French baritone (1936–2003)

- Born: 20 May 1936; Reims, Grand Est, France
- Died: 16 May 2003 (aged 66)
- Education: Conservatoire de Reims; Conservatoire de Musique de Genève
- Occupation: Baritone
- Musical career
- Genres: Classical; opera
- Label: Calliope

Jacques Herbillon (20 May 1936 – 16 May 2003) was a French baritone singer.

== Life ==
Born in Reims, Herbillon studied at the Conservatoire de Reims, at the École Normale de Musique de Paris with Gabrielle Gills, and at the Conservatoire de Musique de Genève with Pierre Mollet. He received the Gabriel Fauré Grand Prize and the Geneva International Music Competition Prize.

A great specialist of Gabriel Fauré, from 1961 he undertook numerous concert and recital tours under the aegis of the Jeunesses musicales de France. He performed internationally in many chamber operas and also participated in many premieres.

He recorded Fauré's melodies with the Romanian pianist Théodore Paraskivesco, including La Bonne Chanson and L'Horizon chimérique and also an album of mélodies by Ravel, including the Don Quichotte à Dulcinée song cycle; these recordings were issued by the Calliope label.

== Discography ==
=== 33rpm ===
- Gabriel Fauré, Mélodies, with Théodore Paraskivesco (piano), Op. 1, 2, 4, 5, 6, 7 and 8 – CAL 1841
- Gabriel Fauré, Mélodies, with Théodore Paraskivesco (piano), p. 21 Poème d'un jour, Op. 18, 23, 27, 39 and 43 – CAL 1842
- Gabriel Fauré, Mélodies, with Théodore Paraskivesco (piano), Op. 58 5 Mélodies de Venise, Op. 46, 51 and 57 – CAL 1843
- Gabriel Fauré, Mélodies, with Théodore Paraskivesco (piano), Op. 61 La Bonne Chanson, Op. 76, 83, 85 and 86 – CAL 1844
- Gabriel Fauré, Mélodies, with Théodore Paraskivesco (piano), Op. 3 nº2, Op. 92, 94, Op. 106 Le Jardin clos, Op. 113 Mirages, L'Horizon chimérique – CAL 1845
- Henri Duparc, Mélodies, with Chantal Debuchy (piano) – CAL 1801
- Maurice Ravel, Mélodies, with Théodore Paraskivesco (piano) – CAL 1856
