= Caroline Haffner =

Caroline Haffner is a musical performer.

== Biography ==
She was born Caroline Murat in Paris and studied piano with Alfred Cortot and Samson François, Pierre Sancan, and later with Lev Oborin in Moscow. She was awarded her Licence de Concert when she was 14 years old from the Ecole Normale de Musique de Paris. Caroline started a lifelong career as teacher and performer aged 18 in Paris. She won the Grand Prix at the Genève International Competition and the Terni Casagrande. She cofounded with Martin Engstroem the Verbier Academy.
