= John Robilette =

John Robilette is an American classical pianist.

== Performance career ==
His international concert career has included performances in 24 countries: the United States, Russia, the Netherlands, England, France, Switzerland, Austria, Luxembourg, Iceland, Poland, Germany, Hungary, Bulgaria, Czechoslovakia, Belarus, Italy, Portugal (and the Azores), Turkey, Argentina, Uruguay, Brazil, Venezuela, The Dominican Republic, and Chile. He has performed at The Wigmore Hall and Saint John Smith’s Square in London; the Kennedy Center and the Coolidge Auditorium of the Library of Congress in Washington, D.C.; the Sala Cecelia Meireles in Rio de Janeiro, Brazil; in a live recital and interview over WNYC public radio in New York City (“Around New York”); and at the National Portrait Gallery of the Smithsonian Institution as one of the official events of the 1981 presidential inauguration. He has made commercial recordings with international distribution that have garnered critical acclaim. His repertoire has covered Mozart to Saint-Saëns, with renditions of major piano concertos including: Beethoven, Schumann, Franck and Saint-Saëns and the Mozart Rondo in D. These have also been broadcast in U.S. major cities. The emotional and romantic warmth of his playing, plus the elegance and generosity of expression have led some critics to regard him as a throwback to the “Golden Age” of piano playing. He has represented the United States as a cultural ambassador on world tours to Europe and South America in 1987 and 1988, and has since performed in the residencies of American ambassadors including ones in Buenos Aires, Montevideo, Santa Domingo, Prague, Luxembourg, Belarus, and London.

== Education ==
Born in Chicago, Illinois, and raised in Wisconsin, Robilette began his early studies in the Midwest with a pupil of Alfred Cortot. Afterward, he went to the École Normale de Musique in Paris, France, where he studied with Madame Bascourret de Guèraldi, a former assistant to Cortot. He then went to Los Angeles to study with Aube Tzerko, a former assistant to Artur Schnabel, thus establishing a link with the interpretive style of two of the greatest pianists of the first half of the twentieth century. During this time, Robilette was chosen as a Tanglewood Fellow where he came under the aegis of Raymond Lewenthal and was awarded three public performances of chamber music (including the Liszt Grand Duo) at the Tanglewood Summer Music Festival in 1974.

Afterward, Robilette was privately sponsored by people in Hollywood and Switzerland to return to Europe for further study with Louis Kenner and Peter Feuchtwanger in London. Robilette holds an MFA from UCLA and a Doctor of Musical Arts from the Catholic University of America, where he came under the guidance of American pianist William Masselos.

== Administrative ==
Robilette has helped wed the arts and music to U.S. public diplomacy and cultural exchange, having created the Artistic Ambassador Program for Charles Z. Wick, who led the United States Information Agency in the 1980s and was a close friend of Ronald Reagan. After establishing this federal program, Robilette directed it for seven years, during which time it extended to 63 countries. The program held live auditions in the 50 U.S. states seeking unrecognized American classical musicians, who were then sent on concert tours throughout the world as part of American public diplomacy. The New York Times called it “an innovative cultural program,” and Musical America said that, “It is doubtful if any federal program in this century has proven more cost-effective.” The program was honored in the East Room of the White House in May 1986. Robilette also commissioned eminent American composers to write pieces for the Artistic Ambassadors tours. These composers included: Morton Gould, Norman Dello Joio, George Rochberg, Ernst Bacon, Ross Lee Finney, Elie Siegmeister, Benjamin Lees, Leo Smit, Lee Hoiby, Robert Muczynski, William Mayer, George Perle and Lukas Foss. Their manuscripts reside in a special archive at the Library of Congress.

In 2002, he was asked to design and oversee a live concert series at the Voice of America in Washington, D.C., in celebration of the VOA’s 60th anniversary of broadcasting. This series featured leading classical artists in the United States and was broadcast biweekly to thirty million people throughout the world. The Washington Post called it an "artistically distinguished lunchtime recital series."

In 2005, Robilette organized “The Power of Great Music in the Revival of US Public Diplomacy” at the Library of Congress in Washington D.C. Funded by Alcoa, the evening featured many distinguished cultural icons and political leaders of the United States who all called on the American government to do more in using music to create understanding between people. Georgie Anne Geyer, the syndicated columnist, brought attention to the evening and the roster, writing, “It is made up of sterling Americans such as John Robilette, the great pianist who performed that evening and started the original program.”

== Teaching ==
Robilette has given public master classes at the Mozarteum in Innsbrück, Austria, the National Conservatory in Belarus and two weeks of master classes at the University of Rio de Janeiro in Brazil. In the United States, he has conducted master classes at Rice University, the University of Tennessee at Knoxville, and George Washington University in Washington, D.C. He has also served on the piano faculties of Westchester University in Pennsylvania and The Catholic University of America.

== Selected discography ==
- "Schumann Piano Concerto and Carnaval" (ProArte CDS 3464)
- "French Piano Album" (ProArte 3491)
- "John Robilette Piano Concerti - Beethoven, Mozart, Saint-Saëns” (Musicians Showcase Recordings MS 1031)
- "John Robilette Live At Wigmore Hall in London" (Musicians Showcase Recordings MS 1043)
- “Piano: The Greatest Hits” (Reference Gold by Intersound)
