= Sabri Moudallal =

Syrian singer (1918–2006)

Sabri Moudallal صبري مدلل
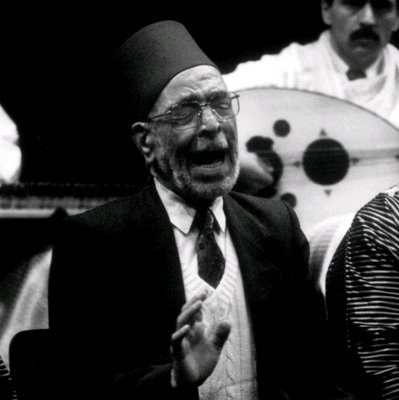

Background information
- Born: 1918; Aleppo, Syria
- Died: 2006 (aged 87–88) Aleppo, Syria
- Genres: Syrian, Arabic Music, Sacred Music, Muwashahat, Qudud Halabiya
- Occupation: Singer
- Instrument: Vocals

Sabri Moudallal (Arabic: صبري مدلل; 1918 – August 2006) was a singer and composer of traditional Syrian music, as well as a businessman.

== Biography ==
Sabri Moudallal was born in the Al-Jalloum neighborhood in Aleppo in 1918. Sabri Moudallal grew up in a musical environment, attending Sufi Zikr ceremonies with his father, who also sent him to Qur'anic school to memorize the Qur'an and study Quranic recitation, the musical recitation of the holy text. The teacher, recognizing the student's musical potential, suggested he go study properly under one of the greatest masters of classical Arabic music in Aleppo at the time, Omar al-Batsh. It was under al-Batsh that Moudallal learned the style and forms of classical Arabic music, the maqams, the muwashshah, the dawr, the layali, the qasidah and mawal and of course the traditional Aleppine qudūd. Moudallal has stated that the first piece he was taught by al-Batsh was al-Batsh's very own composition for the muwashshah Kaḥḥal as-Siḥr Oyunan in the Bayat maqam.

He eventually came to work as a muezzin at the Great Mosque of Aleppo. In 1949, he first sang on Syrian radio. In 1954, he founded a religious music ensemble along with fellow Aleppian sacred music singer, Hassan Haffar.

Moudallal's repertoire consisted primarily of sacred Islamic music, and he was best known for his vast knowledge and mastery of the muwashshah, an old Andalusian poetic form which he studied under al-Batsh, but he was known to perform secular music as well. He was also well known for his mastery of the waslah form, a type of suite common in classical Arabic music. He played a central role in popularizing the traditional musical style of Aleppo throughout Syria and internationally, along with his younger and more popular contemporary, Sabah Fakhri. He was the original performer of several well-known Syrian songs, such as Ib'atli Jawab, which he first performed in 1949, later to become well known through its rendition by Sabah Fakhri, who regularly included it in his performances. According the Aleppian musicologist Muhammad Qadri Dallal, who studied Moudallal's music, his style was influenced by the great modern Egyptian composers, such as Sayyid Darwish, Mohamed El Qasabgi, Mohammed Abdel Wahab, Zakariya Ahmed and Dawood Hosni, which gave his music a new color that didn't previously exist in sacred Islamic music.

Moudallal was also known for his circular breathing technique, which enabled him to breathe while singing, thus making it possible to sing for long periods of time without a pause.

In 1975, Moudallal and his ensemble, including Abdel Raouf Hallak and Hassan Haffar, travelled to Paris to perform a concert of sacred Islamic music. In 1980, the recording of this concert would become Moudallal's first album appearance.

In 1997, a documentary for Syrian television called Aleppo... Maqamat of Pleasure and Delight, directed by Syrian director Mohamed Malas, was produced about Moudallal and his life. The film includes extensive interviews with Moudallal about his life and musical career.

In 1990s, he began to perform with Ensemble Al-Kindi, an Aleppian-based Sufi musical group. This collaboration led to the album The Aleppian Music Room, which came out in 1998.

In 2006, Muhammad Qadri Dallal published a study on Moudallal's music and its roots in the traditional Aleppine style.

== Discography ==
- Muezzins d'Alep – Chants religieux de l'Islam, Ocora, Paris, 1980.
- Wasla d'Alep – Chants traditionnels de Syrie, Inedit, France, 1988.
- Sacred and Profane Songs of Syria, Institut de Monde Arabe, Paris, 1998.
- The Aleppian Music Room (with Ensemble Al-Kindi), 1998.
- Songs from Aleppo, Institut de Monde Arabe, Paris, 1999.
