= List of compositions by Joaquín Nin =

The following is a list of compositions by Joaquín Nin.

== Ballets ==
- L’Écharpe bleue (1937)

== Opera ==
- L'autre, lyrical mimodrama in three acts (1912) (lost)

== Chamber ==
- Cantos de España (1926) — for violin and piano
  - Arranged for cello and piano (1927)
- En el jardín de Lindaraja (1927) — for violin and piano
- Minué en estilo antiguo (1928) (lost) — for lute quartet
- Suite española (1928) — for violin and piano
  - Arranged for cello and piano (1930)
- Cinco comentarios (1928) — for violin and piano
- Rapsodia ibérica (1930) — for violin and piano
- Cantilena asturiana (1934) — for violin and piano

== Solo piano ==
- Cadena de valses (1919)
- Danza ibérica, "En Sevilla una noche de Mayo" (1925)
- Mensaje a Claudio Debussy (1929)
- "1830": Variaciones sobre un tema frívolo (1930)
- Tres danzas españolas (1938)
  - Danza murciana
  - Danza andaluza
  - Segunda danza ibérica
- Canto de cuna para los huérfanos de España (1939)
- Pregón cubano (Allá lejos) (1940)

== Vocal music ==
- Veinte cantos populares españoles (1923) — for voice and piano
- Chansons picaresques espagnoles anciennes (1926) — for voice and piano
- Quatorze airs espagnols anciens (1926) — for voice and piano
- Canciones populares españolas (1926) — for female choir and piano
- Canto elegíaco (vocalización) (1929) — for mezzo-soprano and orchestra
- Diez villancicos españoles (1932) — for voice and piano
- Le chant du veilleur (1937) — for voice and instruments
- Vierge au Calvaire (1932) — for soprano and women's choir
