= Théodore Paraskivesco =

French pianist

Théodore Paraskivesco (born 11 July 1940 in Bucharest) is a naturalized French pianist of Romanian origin.

== Biography ==
Paraskivesco entered the Bucharest Conservatory and studied with Silvia Șerbescu. He graduated with five first prizes. In 1961, he was awarded the Georges Enesco International Competition prize. He then received a scholarship from the French government and continued his musical studies in Paris with Magda Tagliaferro, Yvonne Lefébure and Nadia Boulanger. In 1970, he won the Prix Claude Debussy, and is one of the most respected performers of Debussy's works.

He once taught piano and chamber music at the Conservatoire de Paris (1985) and gives several master classes, notably in Greece and Japan. In 1995, he was also appointed professor of piano at the Conservatoire européen de Paris. He plays in trio with Jean Estournet and Michel Strauss and accompanies singers for melodies.

== Discography ==
Most of the pianist's remaining recordings are published under the Calliope label:

- Claude Debussy: Complete work for piano (1980).
- Beethoven: Sonatas for piano: Op. 31 nº 2 Tempest, Op. 57 Appassionata.
- Gabriel Fauré: Mélodies (Automne, Clair de lune, Les berceaux, et al.) with Jacques Herbillon
- Maurice Ravel: Don Quichotte à Dulcinée, Chansons madécasses and other melodies with Jacques Herbillon.
- Robert Schumann: Liederkreis Op. 39 with Audrey Michael.

== Bibliography ==
- Pâris, Alain (2004). Dictionnaire des interprètes et de l'interprétation musicale depuis 1900. Bouquins (in French). Paris: Éditions Robert Laffont. p. 1289. ISBN 2-221-10214-2. OCLC 300283821.
