= Muhannad Shono =

Saudi artist (born 1977)

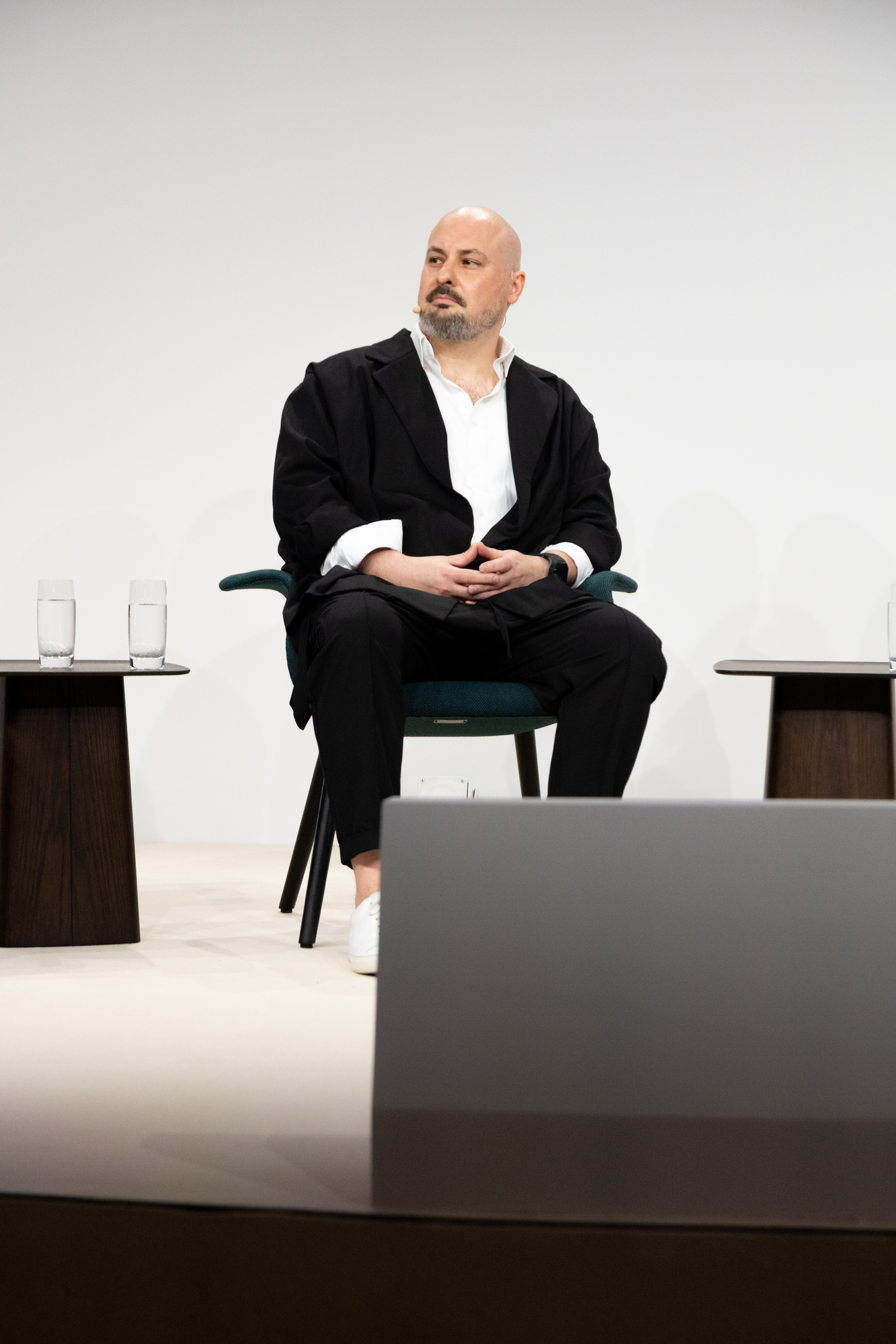
Muhannad Shono, artist, at the Art Basel international art fair in Basel, Switzerland in June 2025.

Muhannad Shono (Arabic: مهند شونو, born 1977) is a Saudi artist and curator, known for his multidisciplinary practice, which includes installation, drawing, painting, and sculpture, often incorporating robotic elements. His work explores themes of memory, identity, and the power of narrative, with a recurring interest in notions of the "natural." Shono represented Saudi Arabia at the 59th Venice Biennale (2022) with the large-scale installation The Teaching Tree. Shono was awarded the Ordre des Arts et des Lettres by the French president in recognition of his contributions to art and impact on the Saudi cultural scene.

== Early life ==
Muhannad Shono was born in Riyadh, Saudi Arabia, in 1977. His parents, both Circassians, whose families had fled Stalin's persecution of ethnic and religious minorities in the Russian Caucasus, were born in Damascus, Syria. The father is of Chechen origin, and the mother is Karachay. Both settled in Muhajreen, where they met and got married. They immigrated to Saudi Arabia in 1974. Shono is their eldest son; he has a brother and a sister. Shono earned a BA in architecture from King Fahd University of Petroleum and Minerals in Dhahran in 2000.

== Career ==
Muhannad Shono's artistic practice pushes boundaries and invites the spectator to reimagine the relationship with culture and identity. His work has been exhibited internationally, often examining the intersections of personal history and collective memory.

His 2022 installation, The Teaching Tree, presented at the 59th Venice Biennale (2022), symbolized the resilience of creative thought, using over 10,000 palm fronds and robotic elements to create a breathing, evolving form. The work was curated by Reem Fadda for the Saudi Pavilion. His piece The Lost Path (2020) was part of Desert X AlUla, exploring mythological landscapes and the tension between presence and absence.

Shono was the contemporary art curator for the Islamic Arts Biennale 2025 in Jeddah. He is currently living and working in Riyadh, running Studio SHONO at JAX District, Diriyah.

== Awards and honors ==
2021-2022: National Cultural Award in Visual Arts, Saudi Arabia
2024: French Order of Arts and Letters at the rank of Knight

== Selected exhibitions ==
Biennales

2025: Desert X, Palm Spring, California, USA.
2023: Letters in Light (Lines we Write), The Islamic Arts Biennale, Jeddah, Saudi Arabia.
2022: The Teaching Tree, The National Pavilion of Saudi Arabia, la Biennale di Venezia. Curated by Reem Fadda.
2022: After the Fall, 6th Lyon Biennale, Lyon, France.
2021: On Losing Meaning, Diriyah Contemporary Art Biennale, Riyadh, Saudi Arabia.
2020-21: BIENALSUR, Riyadh, Saudi Arabia; Buenos Aires, Argentina; Montevideo, Uruguay.
2020: The Lost Path, Desert X, Al Ula, Saudi Arabia. Curated by Raneem Farsi, Aya Aliriza & Neville Wakefield.

Group exhibitions (Selected)

2024: On Losing Meaning, Forest Festival of the Arts, Okayama, Japan.
2024: The Ground Day Breaks, Poetic Illuminations, Paço Imperial, Rio de Janeiro, Brazil. Curated by Diana Wechsler.
2024: The Unseen, Louvre Abu Dhabi, UAE.
2023: And to Flounder in This Sea Is Sweet to Me, Sea Art Festival, Busan, South Korea.
2022: Amakin, 21,39 Jeddah Arts, Jeddah, Saudi Arabia. Curated by Venetia Porter.
2022: On This Sacred Day, AlUla, Saudi Arabia.
2020: The Last Garden of Al-Khidr, I Love You Urgently, 21,39 Jeddah Arts, Jeddah, Saudi Arabia. Curated by Maya El Khalil.
2019: Zamakan, Ithra, Dhahran, Saudi Arabia.
2019: The Caliph Seeks Asylum, Site-Specific Installation for the GAM Sculpture Garden, Torino, Italy.
2018: Albukhary Foundation Gallery, British Museum, London, UK. Curated by Venetia Porter.
2018: In The Open Or In Stealth, MACBA, Barcelona, Spain. Curated by Raqs Media Collective.
2017: After the Wildly Improbable, HKW Haus der Kulturen der Welt, Berlin, Germany. Curated by Adania Shibli.

== Collections ==
The work of Muhannad Shono can be found in several permanent collections:

The Silent Press, Centre Pompidou, Paris, France.
Approaching Stillness, The Black Gold Museum, Riyadh, Saudi Arabia.
The Wall, The British Museum, London, UK.
The Wedge, The British Museum, London, UK.
The Book of Al, The Art Jameel Foundation, Dubai, UAE.
The Unseen, Louvre Abu Dhabi, UAE.
A Forgotten Place, Alserkal Advisory, Dubai, UAE.

== Monographs ==
2024: Muhannad Shono. Works [2014-2024], Kehrer Verlag
2024: Nysten, Anastasia, ed. 2024. Being Muhannad Shono. Selections, Issue 70
2022: Muhannad Shono. The Art Library, Rizzoli
