= Jean Micault =

French pianist (1924–2021)

- Born: 28 December 1924 Bois-Colombes, France
- Died: 16 November 2021 (aged 96)
- Genres: Classical
- Occupation(s): Pianist, music educator
- Instrument: Piano
- Spouse: Claudie Verhaeghe

Jean Micault (born 28 December 1924 in Bois-Colombes; died 16 November 2021) was a French pianist and music educator. He was a direct descendant of Philippe-Alexandre Le Brun de Charmettes, a well-known French historian, writer and administrative expert of the 18th and 19th century.

== Life ==
Micault was interested in music from a young age. He studied harmonic theory and earned a diploma as a music educator. His teacher was, among others, the French pianist and music teacher Alfred Cortot. He first studied with him and then worked for a long time as his assistant at the Accademia Musicale Chigiana in Siena (Italy). Subsequently, he was a pupil of the internationally renowned Beethoven specialist Wilhelm Backhaus.

Micault then was appointed professor at the École Normale de Musique de Paris, where he taught continuously until 2006. At the same time, Micault succeeded Walter Gieseking and Andor Foldes as professor of piano at the Hochschule für Musik Saar in Saarbrücken in 1979. From 1996 to 2005, he was also in charge of the "Masterclasses" in piano and voice at the Conservatory Thionville, Lorraine.

In addition to his pedagogical work, Micault performed as a concert pianist of international standing in numerous countries around the world. He was considered one of the main interpreters of the Romantic repertoire (Beethoven, Schumann, Chopin, Liszt), but he also addressed other styles. Among other things, he included the works of the hitherto lesser-known French composer Maurice Journeau in his repertoire, thus helping this composer to become better known. Furthermore, Micault accompanied vocal interpreters from the field of lyric singing.

In addition to his full-time activities, Micault has been involved in numerous advanced training events in Europe and overseas, as well as being a jury member at well over 100 renowned music competitions. For several years he has been president of the internationally renowned piano competition "Citta di Sulmona" in central Italy.

Jean Micault taught and wrote in four languages: French, English, German and Italian. He was married to the soprano Claudie Verhaeghe. For many years, the couple's life centred on Saarbrücken, the capital of the Saarland.

== Awards and prizes ==
Already at a young age, Micault received awards in the fields of "Musique esthétique" and chamber music. Furthermore, he received the following prizes in his subject "piano":

- First prize for pianists from the National Conservatory of Music in Paris
- First prize "Grand Prix Louis Diémer"
- First prize "Grand Prix International Pianist Competition Vercelli".

== Discography (selection) ==
- 19 Polish songs op. 74 CHOPIN, 6 Polish Songs LISZT; Claudie Verhaeghe soprano; Jean Micault piano; Discover International, 1995. (OCLC 40278983)
- The Women Composers (Fanny Mendelssohn, Clara SCHUMANN, Alma MAHLER); Claudie Verhaeghe soprano; Jean Micault piano; Arcobaleno, 1994, AAOC-93292 Sonata n°2 and 3, CHOPIN, Discover International, Live Recording 1982, DICD 920286 CHOPIN, Waltzes, Arcobaleno, 2003, AAOC - 94432 JOURNEAU, Prélude, Nocturnes, Nouvelles Impressions Fugitives, (Jean MICAULT, Thomas BETZ, pianistes) 2001, SKARBO DSK 1011
- Symphonie en ré mineur Variations symphoniques pour piano et orchestre; César Franck; Jean Micault; Louis Fourestier; Orchestre des cento soli. Paris : Le club français du disque. (OCLC 54019039)

== Literature ==
- Effertz, Lilo: Applaus und Blumen für Jean Micault. In: Saarbrücker Zeitung v. 11. Juni 1999
- Schwambach, Oliver: Das Herantasten des Pianisten. In:Saarbrücker Zeitung (Kultur) v. 28. Dezember 2009
