= Colette Maze =

French pianist (1914–2023)

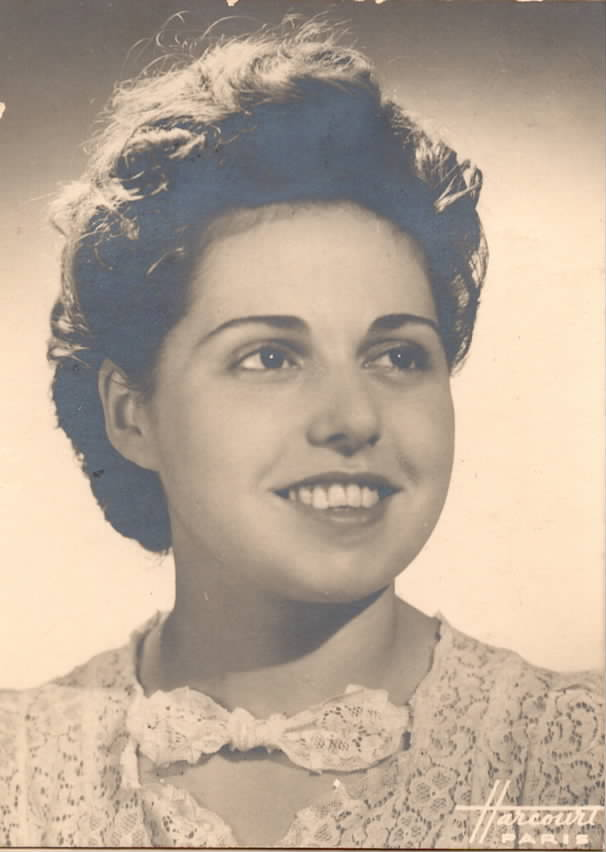
- Maze, c. 1934
- Born: Colette Saulnier; 16 June 1914; Paris, France
- Died: 19 November 2023 (aged 109); Paris, France
- Education: École Normale de Musique de Paris
- Occupations: Pianist; piano teacher

Colette Maze (16 June 1914 – 19 November 2023) was a French classical pianist who studied with Alfred Cortot and Nadia Boulanger. She began recording in her 90s, with a preference for the music by Claude Debussy who was still alive when she was born. She released her seventh album in 2023, as possibly the oldest recording pianist. When she turned a centenarian, she became a favourite of social media.

== Biography ==
She was born Colette Saulnier in Paris on 16 June 1914. Her father, Léon Pierre Saulnier, was the manager of a fertilizer plant. Her grandmother played the piano, and her mother, Denise Claire Piollet, played violin, both giving concerts at their home. The girl began playing the piano at age five. She was educated at home until she was a teenager. She studied piano at the École Normale de Musique in Paris from age 15. Her teachers were Alfred Cortot, Nadia Boulanger and Jeanne Blanchard. She received a Pleyel piano for her 18th birthday which she kept for life.

She wanted to become a professional concert pianist, but her parents opposed the idea, and she failed the final exam. She completed studies to be a piano teacher, and taught decades at both the Ecole Normale de Musique and the conservatoire of Bagneux, Hauts-de-Seine.

After World War II she fell in love with a married man; she raised their son, Fabrice, as a single mother in a small apartment, cut off from her family. She married Émile Fernand Maze, a musician, in Paris on 29 December 1958.

She focused on music by composers from the Romantic period, such as Robert Schumann and Claude Debussy, saying:

I always preferred composers who gave me tenderness, like Schumann and Debussy. Music is an affective language, a poetic language. In music there is everything — nature, emotion, love, revolt, dreams; it's like a spiritual food.

She was fond of the love story of Schumann and his wife Clara. She recorded from her 90s until she was 109, playing the piano daily for four hours to maintain her memory.

Maze died at her home in Paris on 19 November 2023, aged 109.

== Recording ==
When Maze was already in 90s, her son urged her to record, to preserve the tradition of Cortot's teaching, being one of his last surviving pupils, and her unique way of playing. While hesitant at first, she began recording on a Steinway piano in her apartment.

She released seven classical albums, including a CD dedicated to Claude Debussy. In 2021, aged 107, she released her sixth album. In 2023, aged 109, she released her seventh album, including music by George Gershwin, Astor Piazzolla, Schumann and again Debussy, some of the works with guitarist and arranger Bertrand Cazé.

She was a favourite of social media from age 100.

=== Discography ===
- Debussy, Claude (2004). Préludes 1er livre. Seven doc; Siqtrib. EPI. OCLC 590014535.
- Debussy, Claude (2014). Clair de lune; Estampes; Children's corner; La plus que lente. OCLC 927456582.
- Debussy, Claude (2015). Colette Maze Interpréte Claude Debussy. Continuo Classics. ASIN B00K5T1LHM.
- 104 Ans de Piano. Continuo Classics. 2018. ASIN B07B14J44V.
- Debussy, Claude; Satie, Erik; Ravel, Maurice; Su, Zhenzhen (2019). 105 Ans de Piano. Continuo Classics. OCLC 1182602339.
- Debussy, Claude (2021). Un Siècle avec Debussy. Continuo Classics. ASIN B08ZVWPHB8.
- Sakamoto, Ryuichi; Debussy, Claude; Piazzolla, Astor; Gershwin, George; Schumann, Robert (2023). 109 Ans de Piano. Continuo Classics.
  - Ryuichi Sakamoto: "Merry Christmas Mr Lawrence"
  - Debussy: Images oubliée, No. 1
  - Piazzolla: Oblivion
  - Gershwin: The Man I Love, Prelude, No. 2
  - Schumann: Fantaisie, Op. 111, Kinderszenen
