= Veinte cantos populares españoles =

- by Joaquín Nin
- Year: 1923
- Form: Song collection
- Language: Spanish; Valencian/Catalan; Galician; Asturian
- Published: 1923 - Paris (Book I); 1924 - Paris (Book II)
- Publisher: Max Eschig
- Movements: 20
- Scoring: Voice and piano

Veinte cantos populares españoles (from Spanish: Twenty Spanish Folk Songs), also referred to by its French title Vingt chants populaires espagnols, is a song collection by Cuban composer Joaquín Nin. One of the composer's lengthiest compositions and the one that prompted most arrangements and adaptations, it was finished in 1923.

== Background ==
This collection reflects a broader trend in the composer’s work at the time, which involved a deep fascination with Spanish folk music. This trend, which started with the use of Spanish folk material in his now-lost opera L'autre (1912), was part of Nin's commitment to promoting it internationally, especially in France, where he resided for some time, and Cuba, which had gained independence from Spain in 1898. In a way similar to Béla Bartók, Nin attempted not just to compile music from different Spanish regions, but to make harmonizations and stylizations of them, slightly changing melodies to make them suitable for concert audiences.

Today, the harmonizer is responsible for evoking the environment in which the popular song should be situated, as well as its meaning, its function, and the circumstances in which it is or was traditionally heard. The task, therefore, is to evoke rather than to reproduce or imitate; that is, to stylize each song, to extract from each one its own style and, with that style, to treat a single song. Such is the current norm of the harmonizer—a task closer to that of a composer than of a mere harmonist.

— Joaquín Nin, Dos audiciones de música española

The Veinte cantos were first performed in Paris, at the Théâtre des Champs-Élysées, on November 22 and 29, 1923. The songs were not performed as a cycle, but rather as selected songs in recitals given by Nin at the piano and Spanish soprano Maria Barrientos. On November 22, Polo was first performed as an free arrangement of a same-titled composition by tenor and composer Manuel Garcia. On November 29, the composition was premiered as Huit chansons populaires, and consisted of two Galiciennes, Chanson du Comte Sol, Malaguena, Montagnarde, Saeta, Jota tortosina, and Jota valenciana, which concluded the recital.

Each song has a specific dedicatee: Tonada de Valdovinos and Cantar were dedicated to Gabrielle Gills; Tonada de la niña perdida and Granadina were dedicated to Vera Janacopoulos; and Maria Barrientos was the dedicatee of all the rest of the pieces in Book I. The Tres canciones gallegas were dedicated to Speranza Calo, Marya Freund, and Louise Alvar, respectively. Asturiana was dedicated to Jane Bathori, Paño murciano was dedicated to Ninon Vallin, and Villancico Catalán was dedicated to Suzanne Balguerie. El cant dels aucells bore a special dedication: it was dedicated to Magdeleine Greslé, "asking her to wear this humble Catalan flower in the beautiful name of Claude Debussy, the beloved master". El vito was dedicated to Madeleine Grey and Polo was dedicated to Alicita Felici. The only piece without any dedications was Canto andaluz.

The first book was published in 1923 in Paris by Max Eschig. The publisher had a commercial arrangement that allowed them to publish Nin's works even before their premieres.The second book was published in 1924, after Polo and Galiciennes were first performed.

=== Arrangements ===
Veinte cantos was very influential in Nin's own later oeuvre, and many of his later compositions were arrangements or adaptations based on pieces first devised in it. The arrangements and adaptations include:

- Canciones populares españolas, for female chorus and piano (1926)
- Chants d'Espagne, for violin and piano (1926)
  - arranged for cello and piano (1927)
- Suite española, for violin and piano (1928)
  - arranged for cello and piano (1930)
- Cinco comentarios, for violin and piano (1928) (No. 1 was based on Tonada de Valdovinos)
- La vierge au Calvaire (Estampa andaluza), for soprano, female chorus and piano (1932) (based on Saeta)
- Cantilène asturienne, for violin and piano (1934) (based on Asturiana)
- Tres danzas españolas, for piano (1938)

A further adaptation of three movements was presumably devised for lute quartet. The 1928 arrangement, entitled Minué en estilo antiguo, consisted of three movements: De Murcia, De Andalucía, and De Castilla. It was dedicated to Cuarteto Aguilar, who toured the US, Argentina, and Spain extensively between 1929 and 1931. Both the manuscript and all editions of the quartet are now considered to be lost.

== Structure ==
This cycle consists of twenty songs scored for voice (typically a soprano) and piano. The movement list is as follows:

Structure of Joaquín Nin's Veinte cantos populares españoles
Book I
No.	Title	Region	Time period	Tempo marking	Bars	Arranged into
I	Tonada de Valdovinos	Castile	16th century	Moderato	56	Suite espagnole, for violin and piano (1928) (No. 1)
II	Cantar	Castile	16th century	Moderato	57	—
III	Tonada de la niña perdida	Castile	16th century	Moderato	44	Chansons populaires espagnoles, for female chorus and piano (1926) (No. 1); Suite espagnole, arrangement for cello and piano (1930) (No. 1)
IV	Montañesa	Castile	—	Lento - Allegro - Lento (come prima)	56	Chants d'Espagne, for violin and piano (1926) (No. 1); Arrangement for cello and piano (1927)
V	Tonada del Conde Sol	(Murcia)	—	Allegro	63	Chants d'Espagne, for violin and piano (1926) (No. 2); Arrangement for cello and piano (1927)
VI	Malagueña	Andalusia	—	Allegro aperto - Allegro ma non tanto	125	—
VII	Granadina	Andalusia	—	Allegro	93	Chants d'Espagne, for violin and piano (1926) (No. 4); Arrangement for cello and piano (1927)
VIII	Saeta	Andalusia	—	Lento	52	Chants d'Espagne, for violin and piano (1926) (No. 3); Arrangement for cello and piano (1927); La Vierge au Calvaire, for soprano, female chorus, and piano (1932)
IX	Jota tortosina	(Tortosa)	—	Quasi presto	81	—
X	Jota valenciana	(Valencia)	—	Allegro	137	—
Book II
XI	Tres canciones gallegas (I)	(Galicia)	—	Andante molto espressivo	59	—
XII	Tres canciones gallegas (II)	(Galicia)	—	Andantino molto espressivo	74	Chansons populaires espagnoles, for female chorus and piano (1926) (No. 3)
XIII	Tres canciones gallegas (III)	(Galicia)	—	Allegretto	61	—
XIV	Asturiana	(Asturias)	—	Tranquillo	45	Chansons populaires espagnoles, for female chorus and piano (1926) (No. 4); Suite espagnole, arrangement for cello and piano (1930) (No. 3); Cantilène asturienne, for violin and piano (1934)
XV	Paño murciano	Murcia	—	Liberamente - Quasi allegro	73	Suite espagnole, for violin and piano (1928) (No. 2); Arrangement for cello and piano (1930); Trois danses espagnoles, for piano (1938) (No. 1)
XVI	Villancico catalán	(Catalonia)	—	Andante - Andantino - Andante	90	Chansons populaires espagnoles, for female chorus and piano (1926) (No. 2); Suite espagnole, for violin and piano (1928) (No. 3)
XVII	El cant dels aucells (Hommage à Claude Debussy)	Catalonia	—	Andantino - Andantino molto espressivo	95	—
XVIIb	El cant dels aucells (Hommage à Claude Debussy) (Simplified version)	Catalonia	—	Andantino molto espressivo	90	—
XVIII	El vito	Andalusia	—	Allegro risoluto	133	Suite espagnole, for violin and piano (1928) (No. 2); Arrangement for cello and piano (1930); Trois danses espagnoles, for piano (1938) (No. 2)
XIX	Canto andaluz	(Andalusia)	—	Allegro deciso ma con grazia	86	—
XX	Polo	Andalusia	—	Allegretto	102	Trois danses espagnoles, for piano (1938) (No. 3)

Nin acknowledged the influence of Andalusian folk music as the spearhead of Spanish music, even though he wanted to highlight regional music that was, in his opinion, overlooked after Albéniz's Iberia. Most songs were written in Spanish, every song being translated into French by Henri Collet, even though Jota valenciana is partly sung in Valencian, the Tres canciones gallegas are all sung in Galician, Asturiana is sung in Asturian, and Villancico catalán and El cant dels aucells is originally written in Catalan.

== Recordings ==
Veinte cantos was partially performed by the composer frequently throughout his life in Europe. Amongst the oldest and most authoritative recordings is the one taken by Odeon, on December 3, 1929. The recording, taken at the Salle du Conservatoire, in Paris, featured Ninon Vallin as the soprano and the composer at the piano. On this occasion, only Tonada de la niña perdida (No. 3), Montañesa (No. 4), Malagueña (No. 6), Granadina (No. 7), Canto andaluz (No. 19), and Polo (No. 20) were recorded. Nin went on to record selections of this composition with Polydor, Columbia, Pathé, HMV, and Gramophone, among others.

== Reception ==
The collection was described as "of singular distinction for their Hispanism and their novelty" by Spanish musicologist José Subirá. Spanish composer Manuel de Falla wrote in a letter sent to Nin on January 3, 1925: "Needless to tell you, dear Joaquín, the joy with which I received your songs and the keen desire I have to receive the second book. We shall speak of them in full detail in Paris, for by letter it would be impossible to do so effectively. In any case, I congratulate you from the heart for what you have already accomplished in this first published work. There are things I like very much. We shall speak later, with the necessary calm. You may yet go very far, Joaquín!"
