= Samson François =

French pianist and composer (1924–1970)

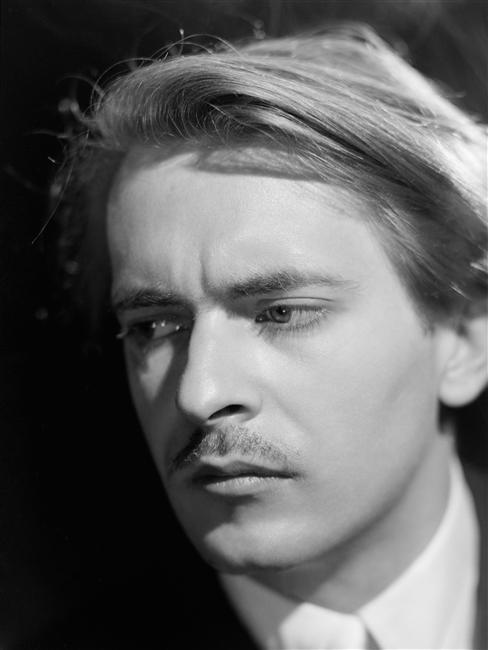
François, 1948

Samson Pascal François (18 May 1924 – 22 October 1970) was a French pianist and composer.

== Biography ==
François was born in Frankfurt where his father worked at the French consulate. His mother, Rose, named him Samson, for strength, and Pascal, for mind. François discovered the piano early – at the age of two – and his first studies were in Italy, with Pietro Mascagni, who encouraged him to give his first concert at the age of six.

He studied in the Conservatoire in Nice from 1932 to 1935, where he again won first prize. François then came to the attention of Alfred Cortot, who encouraged him to move to Paris and study with Yvonne Lefébure at the École Normale de Musique. He also studied piano with Cortot (who reportedly found him almost impossible to teach), and harmony with Nadia Boulanger. In 1938, he moved to the Paris Conservatoire to study with Marguerite Long, the doyenne of French teachers of the age. He won the piano section of the inaugural (1943) Marguerite Long-Jacques Thibaud Competition.

He was particularly admired for his performances of Chopin, Schumann, Debussy, and Ravel. In 2012 his Debussy recordings were awarded the "Preis der Deutschen Schallplattenkritik". His entire studio discography was reissued on compact disc in 2020 by Warner Classics.

François was a keen jazz fan—particularly of the pianist Bud Powell, who lived and performed in Paris—and claimed that jazz influenced his playing. He composed, among other works, "Magies Noires" for solo piano, a concerto for piano and orchestra, and incidental music for film.

He married Josette Bahvsar, and their son Maximilien was born in 1955. Maximilien, who published a biography of his father in 2002 (see bibliography below), died in New Mexico on October 11, 2013. Samson François's extravagant lifestyle, good looks, and passionate but highly disciplined playing, gave him a cult status as a pianist. He had a heart attack on the concert stage in 1968. His early death followed only two years later.

François himself said "never play simply to play well" and, in a remark clearly inspired by his jazz influences, "It must be that there is never the impression of being obliged to play the next note."

== Bibliography ==
- Roy, Jean: Samson François, le poète du piano, éditions Josette Lyon, ISBN 2906757853.
- Spycket, Jérôme, Scarbo, 1985 (in French – a biography of François)
- François, Maximilien-Samson, Samson François, histoire de… mille vies (1924–1970). Editions Bleu Nuit (2002). ISBN 2-913575-54-4 (in French)
