= Congyu Wang =

Congyu Wang 王聪瑀
- Born: Wang Congyu; 7 January 1992 (age 34); Singapore
- Genre: Classical music
- Occupation: Pianist
- Instrument: Piano
- Years active: 2012 - present
- Spouse: Julie Lu (m. 2015)
- Website: Official website

Congyu Wang (Chinese: 王聪瑀} (born 7 January 1992) is a Singaporean concert pianist based in Réunion, France.

== Early life ==
Wang was born in 1992, in Singapore, and has an elder sister. He began playing piano at the age of three. Despite resistance from his parents over his decision to further his studies in piano, he attended Ecole Normale de Musique de Paris with a scholarship, where he studied with French pianists Jean-Marc Luisada and Odile Catelin-Delangle. Later, he attended the Schola Cantorum de Paris where he studied with Gabriel Tacchino.

== Career ==
By the time Wang turned 18, he had participated in several international piano competitions in cities such as Berlin, Bordeaux, Vulaines Sur Seine, Lagny Sur Marne, Merignac, Paris and Slovenia. In the competitions held in Berlin and Bordeaux, he emerged victorious and received the Grand Prizes., as well as a prize at one of the prestigious competitions in Asia, the Ananda Sukarlan Award in Jakarta, Indonesia.

In 2015, Wang released his debut album, Charme, a collection of piano works by French composer Francis Poulenc. The album was released on KNS Classical and received positive reviews from multiple news outlets including Today. In 2018, he released his second album, Reflets dedicated to Claude Debussy on the centennial of the French composer's death. In the same year, he founded the Piano Island Festival and Piano Concerto Festival.

During the COVID-19 pandemic, Wang taught piano students virtually. After the pandemic, with the resumption of concerts and shows, in 2022, Wang became a Steinway Artist. Prior to this, he was a Young Steinway Artist for about 10 years.

Given that Wang has pursued the majority of his musical education in France, he exhibits a strong inclination towards French composers and classical musical genres. With a repertoire comprising nearly 30 piano concertos, Wang has extensively studied the complete solo piano works of Frédéric Chopin and Francis Poulenc. Consequently, he has performed in over 800 recitals globally and has shared the stage with numerous renowned musicians including such as Romain Leleu, Agnes Kallay, Giancarlo de Lorenzo, Elena Xanthoudakis, Grigor Palikarov, Quatour Arsis etc. In December 2023, Wang published his autobiography, The Wandering Pianist which reached the bestseller status on Amazon.

== Personal life ==
In 2010, while studying in Paris, he met his future wife, Julie Lu, a fellow student Chinese French from the Reunion Island. They were married in 2015, and Wang would move to Reunion Island.

== Discography ==
- 2015 - Charme
- 2018 - Reflets
