= Qudud Halabiya =

Traditional Syrian song genre

Qudud Al-Halabiya
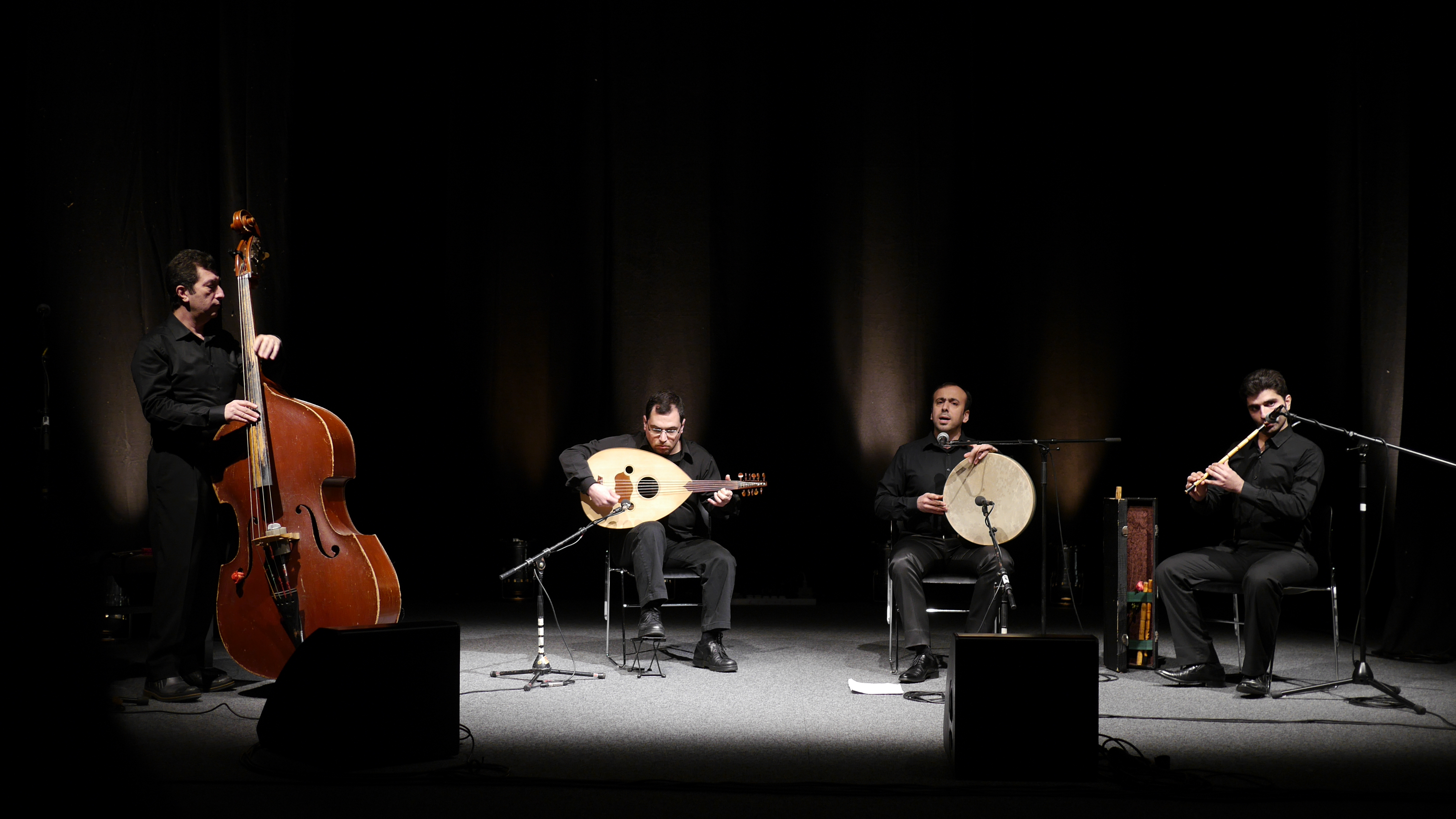
- A group of Syrian musicians from Aleppo
- Native name: قدود حلبية
- Cultural origins: Syria

Al-Qudoud Al-Halabiya
- UNESCO Intangible Cultural Heritage
- Country: Syria
- Reference: 01578
- Region: Arab States

Inscription history
- Inscription: 2021 (16th session)
- List: Representative

The Qudud Al-Halabiya (Arabic: قدود حلبية, romanized: Qudūd Ḥalabīya, literally "musical measures of Aleppo") are traditional Syrian songs combining lyrics in Classical Arabic based on the poetry of Al-Andalus, particularly that in muwashshah form, with old religious melodies collected mainly by Aleppine musicians. Their themes are most often love, longing and spirituality.

At the 16th session of the Intergovernmental Committee for the Protection of the Intangible Cultural Heritage in December 2021, the entire set of songs was included into the UNESCO's intangible cultural heritage list as Intangible cultural heritage.

== History ==
Qudud Halabiya originated in al-Andalus. However, it was formed as a musical genre in the Levant, mainly in the city of Aleppo. It was developed by the musicians in Aleppo, based on secular, folk and religious songs.

During the 20th century, Qudud Halabiya further developed and popularized by many Aleppine musicians including Omar al-Batsh (1885–1950), Abdul Qader al-Hajjar (1917–1993), Bakri al-Kurdi (1909–1978), Bakri Rajab (1910–1979), Sabri Moudallal (1918-2006), Sabah Fakhri (1933-2021), Mohammad Khairy (1935-1981), etc.

Contemporary Qudud Halabiya performers include Mohammad Qadri Dallal, Shadi Jamil, Nihad Najjar, Hamam Khairy, Shahd Barmada, Nadya Manfukh, Subhi Toufic, Ahmad Azrak etc.

== Famous songs ==
=== "Ya Tira Tiri" ===
"Ya Tira Tiri Ya Hamama" (Fly, fly away, my dove) has been famously sung by Fairouz and Sabah Fakhri. It was also played by Abdallah Chahine on his Oriental piano.

== See also ==
- Muwashshah
- Tarab
