= Schola Cantorum de Paris =

Private music conservatory in Paris, France

Coordinates: 48°50′30″N 02°20′29″E

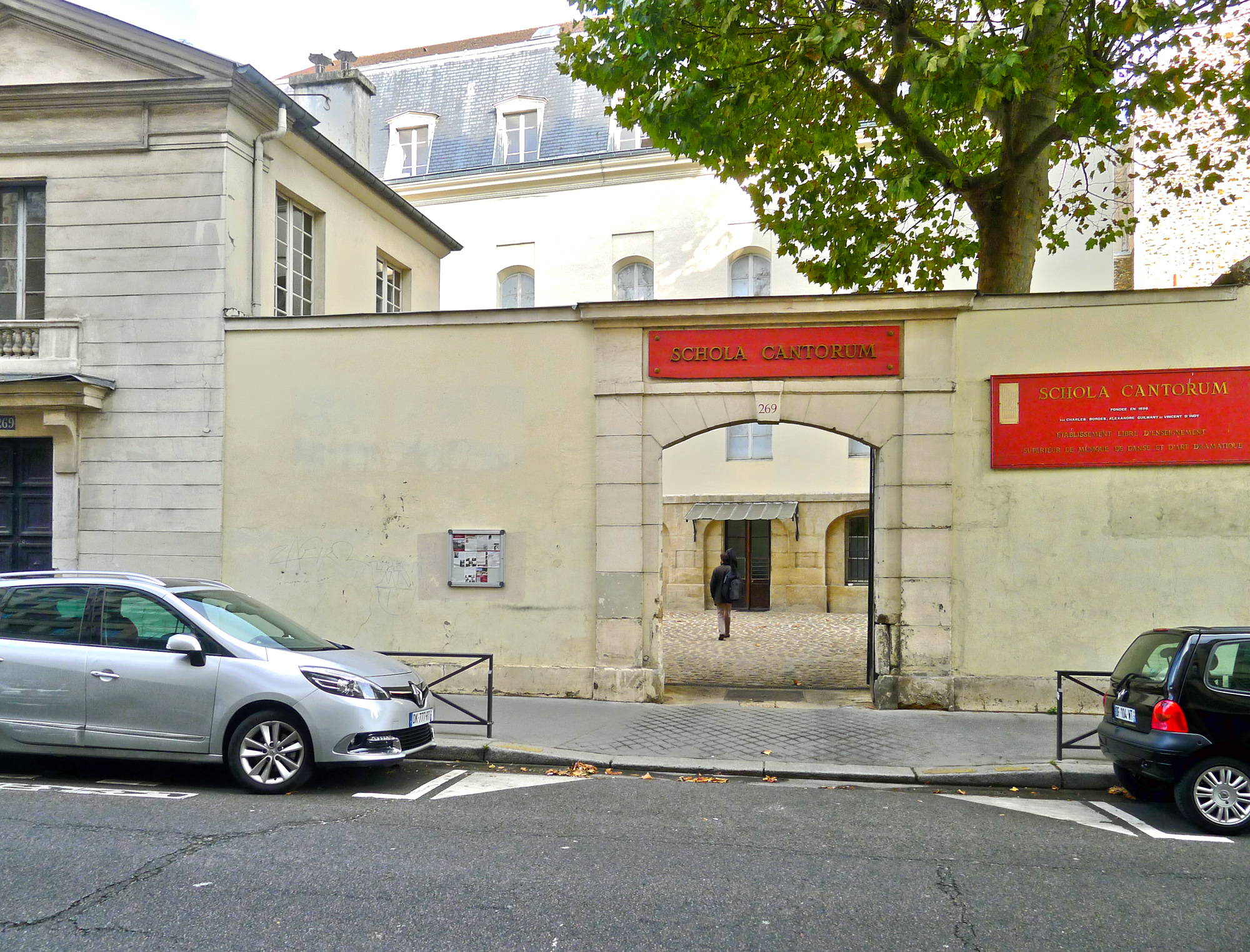
Schola Cantorum

The Schola Cantorum de Paris (schola cantorum being Latin for 'singers' school') is a private music conservatory located in the Latin Quarter of Paris. It was founded in 1894 by Charles Bordes, Alexandre Guilmant and Vincent d'Indy as a counterbalance to the Paris Conservatoire's emphasis on opera.

== History ==
The Schola was founded in 1894 and opened on 15 October 1896 as a rival to the Paris Conservatoire. Alexandre Guilmant, an organist at the Conservatoire, was the director of the Schola before d'Indy took over. D'Indy set the curriculum, which fostered the study of late Baroque and early Classical works, Gregorian chant, and Renaissance polyphony. According to the Oxford Companion to Music, "A solid grounding in technique was encouraged, rather than originality, and the only graduates who could stand comparison with the best Conservatoire students were Magnard, Roussel, Déodat de Séverac, and Pierre de Bréville." The school was originally located in Montparnasse; in 1900 it moved to its present site, a former convent in the Quartier Latin.

When it was founded, the Schola’s objectives were to return to the performance of plainchant in the Gregorian tradition, to revive the music of Palestrina, to create modern religious music, and to enrich the repertoire of organists. During its early years, the Schola Cantorum de Paris expanded its activities to various regions of France through festivals, conferences, and musical events. The early 20th century was marked by a shift away from the original goals regarding the performance and promotion of early music. Composition now became the focus of the schola’s activities.

=== Notable teachers ===
- Isaac Albéniz
- Léon Barzin
- Antoine Geoffroy-Dechaume
- Wanda Landowska
- Jean Langlais
- Olivier Messiaen
- Darius Milhaud
- Albert Roussel

== Alumni ==
In addition to those mentioned above, students, not all full-time, have included:

- Joseph Canteloube
- Helen Eugenia Hagan (African American)
- Anne Terrier Laffaille
- John Jacob Niles (Kentucky)
- Cole Porter (for a few months in 1920) (Indiana)
- Georgios Poniridis
- Theodor Rogalski (Romania)
- Yvonne Rokseth
- Félix Raugel
- Dulce María Serret
- Erik Satie (as a mature student)
- Joaquin Turina (Spain)
- Edgard Varèse
- Congyu Wang (Singapore)
