= Muhajreen Palace =

Presidential Palace and State Guest House in Damascus, Syria

Coordinates: 33.5216861993°N 36.271629565°E

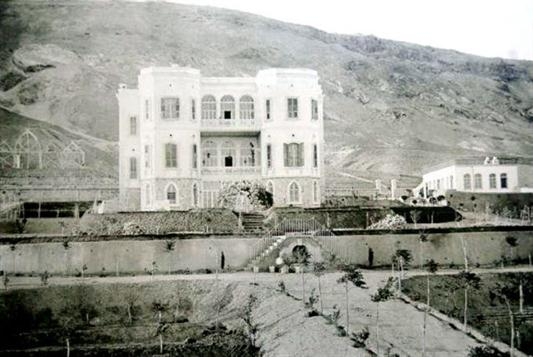
Muhajreen Palace overlooking Damascus

The Muhajreen Palace in Damascus, Syria, also referred to as the Al-Muhajireen Palace, is a historically significant building located in the Muhajreen neighborhood on the slopes of Mount Qasioun. It served as the first presidential palace of Syria, and was subsequently used as a state guest house.

== History ==
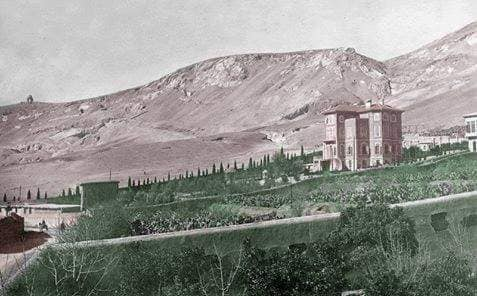
Muhajreen Palace with Mount Qasioun in the back

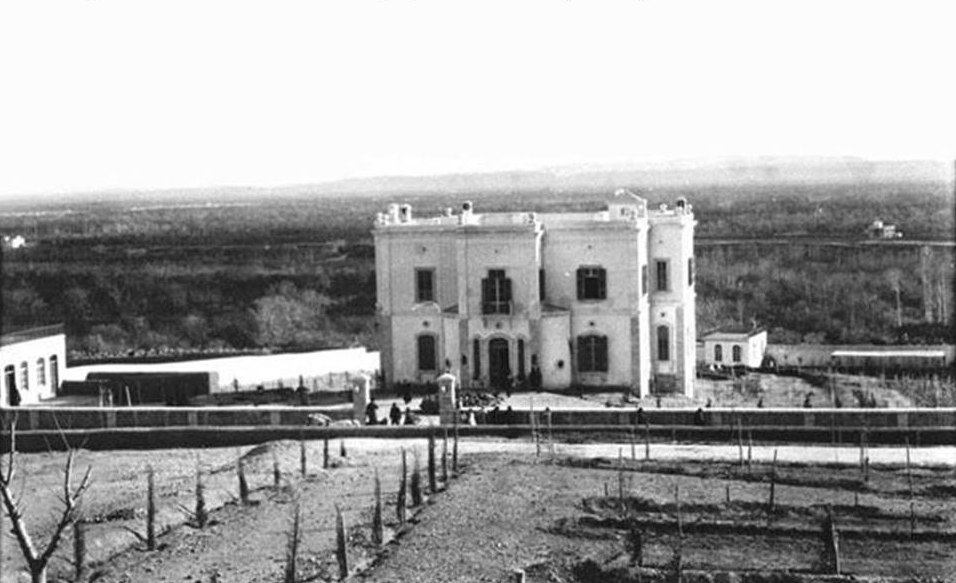
Muhajreen Palace

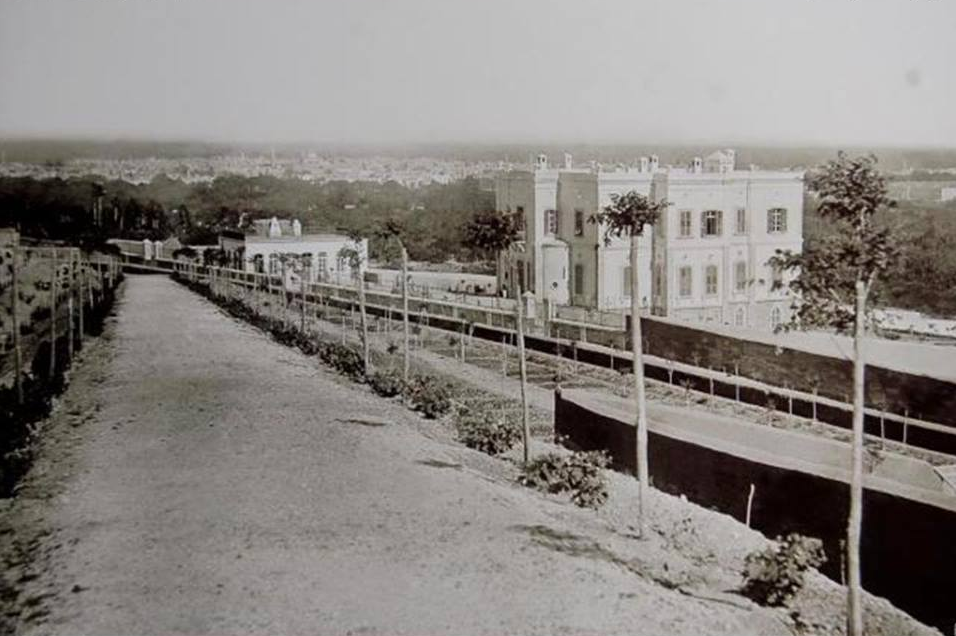
Muhajreen Palace with the old city of Damascus in the back

The Muhajreen area was initially developed in the late 19th century by Ottoman governor Hüseyin Nâzım Pasha (1854–1927), who settled Muslim immigrants from Crete there following sectarian strife.

The palace was constructed by Nazim Pasha between 1902 and 1904, based on a design by the Spanish architect Fernando de Aranda, who also created several other early 20th-century monuments in Damascus.

The property was later sold to the Egyptian Wahba Khurshid Pasha for five thousand Ottoman pounds. During the World War I, the palace served as the official residence of Djemal Pasha and the Ottoman army command. From 1915 to 1918, it was repurposed as a military hospital under the supervision of Amal Pasha Al-Mersini. King Faisal resided there after his coronation in Syria in March 1920, remaining until his departure following the Battle of Maysalun in July of the same year. Subsequently, the palace housed the embassy of the Kingdom of Iraq during the interwar period.

The building gained further prominence when it became the residence of Syria's first elected president, Muhammad Ali Bey al-Abid (1932–1936). During his presidency, the neighborhood's connectivity and importance increased with the introduction of a tramway line connecting it to central Damascus. The palace's architecture reflects an eclectic blend of styles from its era, combining Ottoman influences with early modern design elements.

In the second half of the 20th century, it continued to serve as a presidential palace before it became a state guest house of the Syrian government. The palace underwent extensive renovation in 2009 and 2010.

After the Fall of Damascus and ousting of president Bashar al-Assad in December 2024, citizens entered the palace taking photos and looting valuable items such as furniture and ornaments.

== Literature ==
- Weber, Stefan (2006). Zeugnisse kulturellen Wandels Stadt, Architektur und Gesellschaft des osmanischen Damaskus im 19. und frühen 20. Jahrhundert (Thesis) (in German). Berlin: Freie Universitat Berlin.
