= Sabah Fakhri =

Syrian singer (1933–2021)

Sabah Fakhri صباح فخري
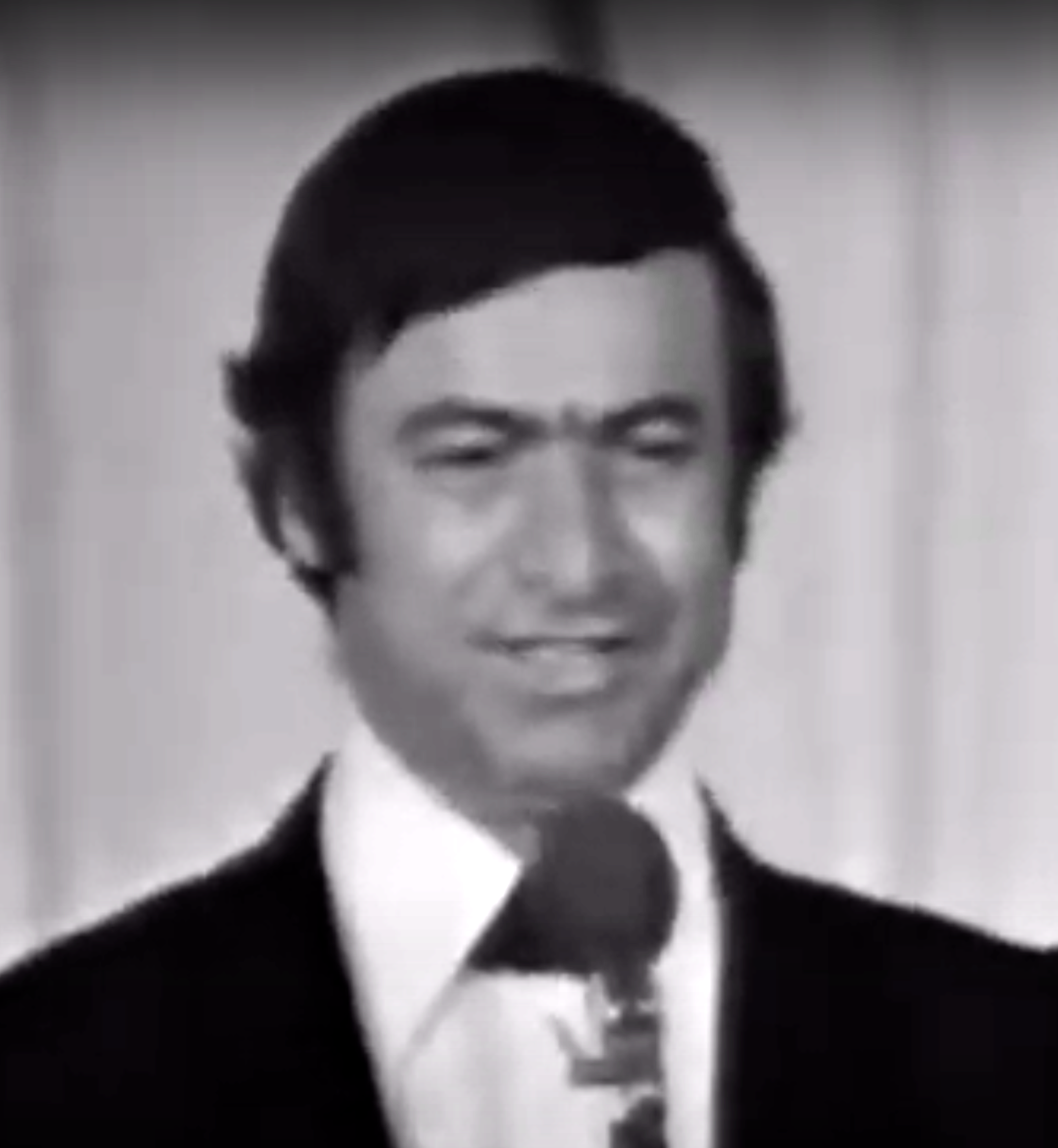
- Fakhri performing in Tunisia in 1973

Background information
- Also known as: Sabah Fakhri
- Born: Ṣabaḥ al-Din Abu Qaws; May 2, 1933; Aleppo, Syria
- Died: November 2, 2021 (aged 88) Damascus, Syria
- Genres: Classical Arabic (Syrian, muwashahat, qudud halabiya)
- Occupation: Singer
- Instrument: Vocals
- Years active: 1965–2010

Sabah al-Din Abu Qaws (Arabic: صباح الدين أبو قوس; May 2, 1933 – November 2, 2021), commonly known as Sabah Fakhri (Arabic: صباح فخري, Syrian Arabic pronunciation: [sˤɑˈbɑːħ ˈfæχɾi]), was a Syrian tenor singer from Aleppo.

With over 50 years of popularity as a singer, Sabah Fakhri modified and popularized the then-fading forms of traditional Arabic music Muwashahat and Qudud Halabiya. He was known for his strong vocals, control and execution of Maqamat and harmony, as well as his dominant and charismatic performances on stage.

== Biography ==
Sabah was born in Aleppo, Syria, in 1933, then a major center for Arabic and Oriental music. He enrolled in the Academy of Arabic Music of Aleppo, and later studied at the Academy of Damascus, from which he graduated in 1948. He was given the stage name "Fakhri" by his mentor, Syrian nationalist leader Fakhri al-Baroudi, who encouraged him as a young boy to stay in Syria and not travel to Italy. One of Fakhri's earliest performances was in 1948 at the Muhajreen Palace in Damascus, before President Shukri al-Quwatli and Prime Minister Jamil Mardam Bey. Unlike many Arab artists, he never studied or worked in Cairo, insisting that his fame is linked to the artistic heritage of his homeland, Syria.

After studying muwashshahat, rhythms, Samah dance, poems, adwar, solfège, and playing the oud—under the guidance of prominent figures in Arabic music and great Syrian musicians such as Sheikh Ali al-Darwish, Sheikh Omar al-Batsh, Majdi al-Aqili, Nadim and Ibrahim al-Darwish, Muhammad Rajab, and Aziz Ghannam—he worked in his youth as an employee for the Awqaf (religious endowments) of Aleppo and as a muezzin at the Al-Rawda Mosque there.

Sabah Fakhri was one of the very few singers from Arabic-speaking countries to have reached widespread popularity by singing in the Arabic language (including Europe, Asia, the Americas, and Australia). His name is enshrined in the Guinness Book of Records for his prowess in Caracas, Venezuela, where he sang continuously for 10 hours without pause.

In 1998, Fakhri became a member of the Syrian parliament for the session, as a representative of artists.

== Interaction with the audience ==
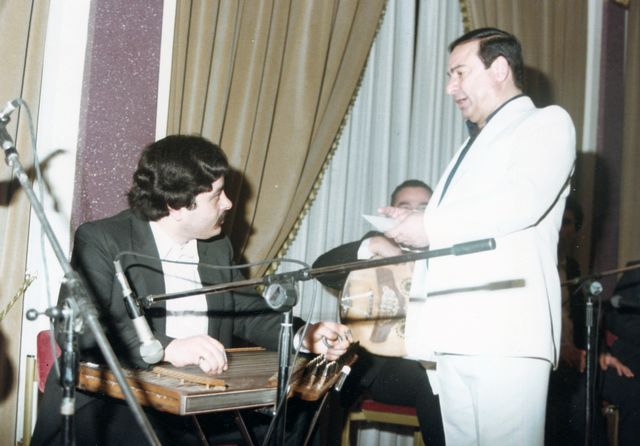
Fakhri with qanun player Hassan Tnnary

When he performed, Fakhri insisted on interacting with his audience. Before singing, he insisted on having a good atmosphere by having good musicians and an appropriate sound system. While performing he asked for the lights to remain on, to interact with the audience. He said that the audience played a key role in bringing out the performer's creativity. The audience should be aware of the music and poetry, so they would value the music given to them.

He refused to comment or take sides on the Syrian civil war, but kept in touch with family and friends in Syria throughout.

== Death ==
Fakhri died on November 2, 2021, in Damascus, aged 88.

== Major works ==
Fakhri sang many traditional songs from Aleppo, based on the poems of Abu Firas al-Hamdani, Al-Mutanabbi and other poets. He also worked with contemporary composers. Some of his most popular songs are:

- Yā Hādī al-‘Ess / Mālek Yā Ḥelwa(t) Mālek
- Khamrat el-Ḥobb
- Yā Ṭīra(t) Ṭīrī
- Fōg el-Nakhal (Iraqi song)
- ’Adduka al-Mayāss
- Yā Māl el-Shām
- Muwashshaḥ Imlīlī / Yā Shādī el-Alḥān
- Eba‘atlī Jawwāb
- Ah Yā Ḥalō

== Awards ==
Fakhri received a certificate of appreciation and the key to the city of Las Vegas, Nevada, in recognition of his art and his efforts to enrich the traditional Arabic artistic movement.

He was similarly awarded the key to the city of Detroit, Michigan, and the key to the city of Miami, Florida, along with a certificate of appreciation. UCLA held a ceremony in his honor at Royce Hall, presenting him with certificates of appreciation for having carried, and continuing to carry, the banner of reviving authentic Arabic vocal heritage.

He has performed at the Nobel Peace Prize hall in Sweden and the Beethoven Hall in Bonn, Germany. In France, he performed at the Palais des Congrès in Paris, as well as several concerts at the Arab World Theater in Paris and the Amandier Theater in Nanterre. He also conducted an artistic and cultural tour of Britain, where he performed concerts and gave lectures on Arabic music and instruments in London, York, Cardiff, Birmingham, Chesterfield, Manchester, Derbyshire, and Coventry.

President Habib Bourguiba held a ceremony in his honor and awarded him the Tunisian Cultural Order in 1975. On February 5, 2000, Sultan Qaboos presented him with a medal of honor in recognition of his artistic contributions over half a century and his merit in preserving Arabic vocal heritage. In 1978, he won the gold medal at the Arabic Song Festival in Damascus.

He received the Arabic Singing Award from the United Arab Emirates as one of the most important pioneers who continue to contribute to and perform authentic Arabic vocal heritage. The Egyptian Ministry of Tourism honored him with the Cairo International Song Festival award in recognition of his artistic contributions, which have enriched the field of authentic Arabic singing to serve as a source of joy for future generations of connoisseurs of fine art. He was also honored by the Arabic Music Festival and Conference in Egypt, receiving letters of thanks for his participation and contributions over several years at the Grand Opera House, the Republic Theater in Cairo, and the Conference Palace theater in Alexandria.

During his participation in the tenth session of the Fes Festival of World Sacred Music in 2004, the President of the Fes-Sais Association presented him with a certificate of appreciation and honorary membership to the festival's board of directors in reverence of his art and recognition of his efforts to preserve Arabic musical and vocal heritage. Additionally, the Governor of Fes presented him with the key to the city, a certificate of appreciation, and honorary membership to the city council, which was the first time the key key to the city was granted to a foreign artist.

On June 22, 2004, the Arab League Educational, Cultural and Scientific Organization (ALECSO) presented him with an honorary award, the organization's shield, and a document detailing the reasons for the award, citing his preservation and promotion of Arabic music.

On 12 February 2007, Fakhri was awarded the Syrian Order of Merit of Excellent Degree by the former Syrian president Bashar al-Assad in recognition of his achievements in serving and his role in reviving the artistic heritage of Syria.

== Honors ==
- Lebanon: Commander of the National Order of the Cedar.
- Morocco: Grand Cordon of the Order of Ouissam Alaouite.
- Oman: Grand Cordon of the Order of Civil Merit.
- Syria: Grand Cordon of the Order of Civil Merit.
- Tunisia: Grand Cordon of the National Order of Merit
