= Shadi Jamil =

Syrian singer from Aleppo (born 1955)

Shadi Jamil شادي جميل
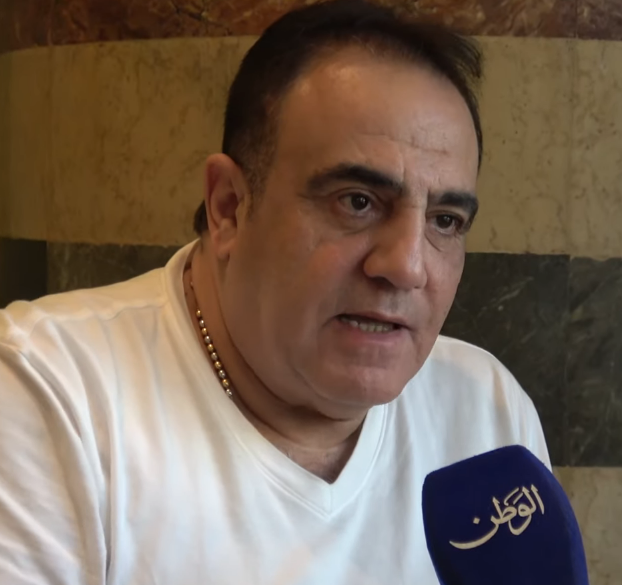
- Jamil in June 2020
- Born: Georges Gebran جورج جبران; 22 September 1955 (age 70); Aleppo, Syria
- Occupations: Singer, musician
- Musical career
- Genres: Qudud Al Halabiyya; Arabic pop; Mawwal; Folk

Shadi Jamil (Arabic: شادي جميل) (born 16 September 1955) is a Syrian singer from Aleppo who specializes in the Qudud Al Halabiyya genre. Shadi is known as one of the best Arabic singers in the world.

== Major works ==
- Ensa Gharamak
- Ya Hbayeb
- Ayel mani Ayel
- Lesh Ana
- Toul el bunayyah
- Esmek ya Shahbah (for Aleppo)
- Qoumou ta nerkos Arabiyeh
