= Victor Paukstelis =

Lithuanian pianist and painter (born 1983)

- Viktoras Paukštelis
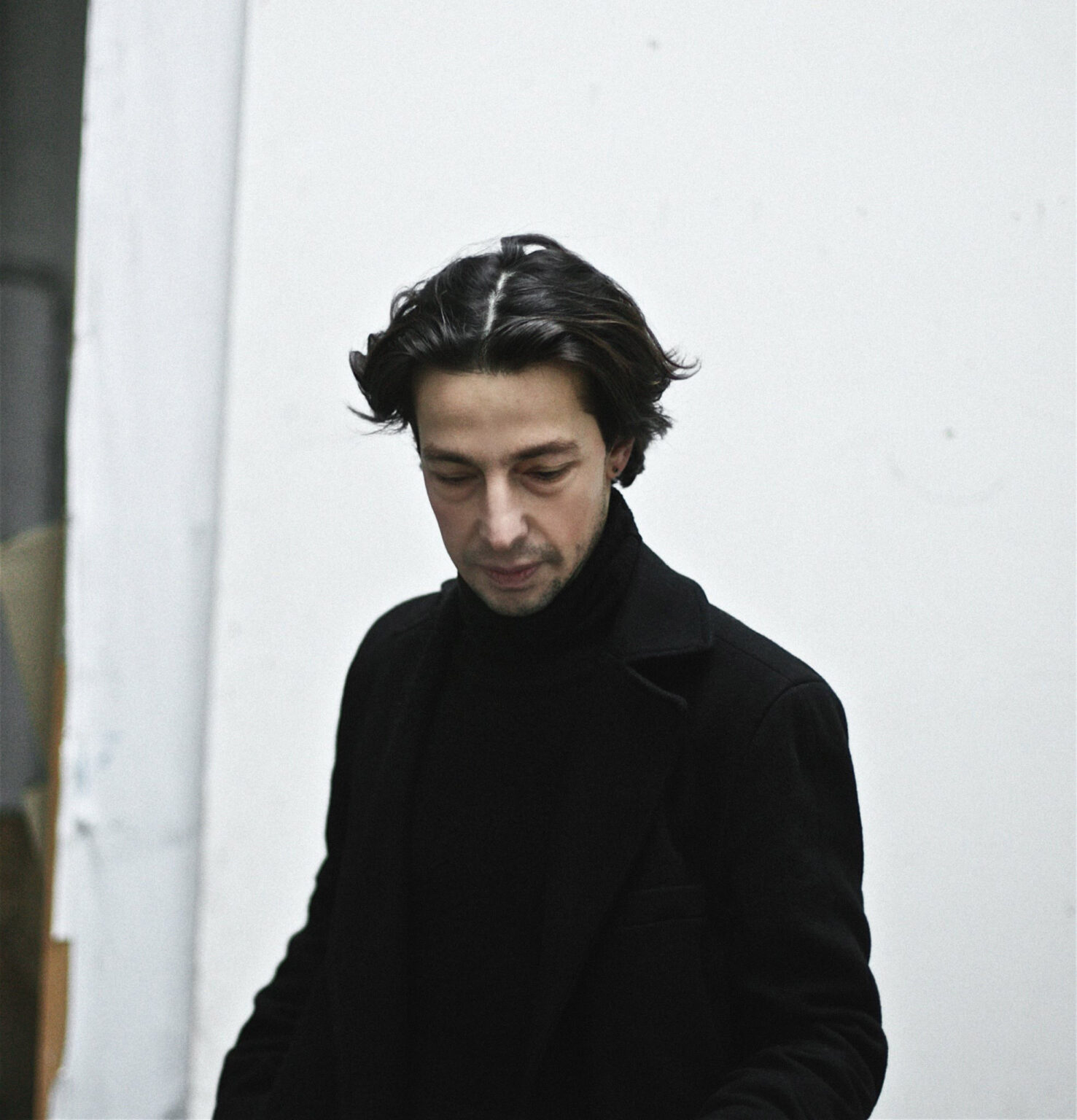
- Born: 25 May 1983 (age 42); Vilnius, Lithuania
- Occupations: Painter and pianist
- Website: https://victorpaukstelis.com/

Victor Paukstelis (born Viktoras Paukštelis, 25 May 1983) is a Lithuanian pianist and painter.

== Early life and education ==
Paukstelis was born in Vilnius, Lithuania. A graduate of the National M. K. Čiurlionis School of Art and Balys Dvarionas Music School, he has obtained a Bachelor's, Master's and a Licentiate of Arts degree from the Lithuanian Academy of Music and Theatre, a Bachelor's and Master's degree from Vilnius Academy of Arts and has studied at Ecole Normale de Musique de Paris.

== Professional career ==
=== Pianist ===
Paukstelis' repertoire includes piano music by Jean-Philippe Rameau, Domenico Scarlatti, Anatoly Lyadov, Alexander Scriabin, César Franck. He also plays music pieces composed by his brother Vytautas Paukstelis. Victor is the head judge on the judge panel of Musica Amabile young Lithuanian pianists' competitions.

==== Festivals and competitions ====
- 2002: Verbier Festival, Switzerland (tutored by Gary Graffman and Boris Petrushansky)
- 2002, 2003: The Music Festival of Pite Alvdal, Sweden (tutored by Jiri Hlinka)
- 2003: The International Holland Music Sessions Festival, the Netherlands (tutored by Mikhail Voskresensky)
- 2004: West Chester University, United States (tutored by Anthony di Bonaventura)
- 2005: Yamaha Pianist Competition, Lithuania
- 2008: Accademia Internationale di Musica di Cagliari, Italy
- 2009: Albert Roussel scholarship Ecole Normale de Musique de Paris, France
- 2010: Cite des Arts de Paris scholarship, France
- 2015 March 26: A recital at Berlin Philharmonic 'Recital of Restless Paintings', Berlin, Germany
- 2015 September 27: A solo recital at Carnegie Hall 'Recital of Restless Paintings', New York City, United States
- 2016 October 27: A solo recital at Musikeverien, 'Recital of Restless Paintings'in Vienna, Austria
- 2016 November 30: A solo recital at Carnegie Hall, New York City, United States

=== Painter ===
Solo exhibitions:

- 2012: Beatrice Grinceviciute Museum, Vilnius, Lithuania
- 2013: Beatrice Grinceviciute Museum, Vilnius, Lithuania
- 2014: Marija and Jurgis Slapeliu Museum, Vilnius, Lithuania
- 2016: Pylimo gallery, Vilnius, Lithuania
- 2016: The Niagara Pumphouse Arts Centre, Niagara-on-the-Lake, Canada.
- 2017: exhibition "Eclipse" at "Music gallery", Vilnius, Lithuania
- 2017: exhibition "Belvedere", in gallery "Meno forma", Kaunas
- 2018: exhibition "Vanishing Portraits" at gallery "Akademija", Vilnius, Lithuania
- 2018: exhibition "I Cannot Remember Her Name" at gallery "Kunstkamera", Vilnius, Lithuania
- 2019: exhibition "Cultural Landscapes" at I. Kant public library, department of art, Klaipėda, Lithuania
- 2019: exhibition "The Dream of an Ornithologist" at gallery "Baroti", Klaipėda, Lithuania
- 2019: exhibition "House of Jäger" at gallery "Kunstkamera", Vilnius, Lithuania
- 2020: exhibition "The Dream of an Ornithologist" at Town Hall, Vilnius, Lithuania
- 2020: exhibition "Zealand" at Arka Gallery, Vilnius, Lithuania
- 2021: exhibition "Gambit" at Klaipėda Culture Communication Center, Klaipėda, Lithuania
- 2022: exhibition "Dehermetization" at Lukiškės Prison 2.0, Vilnius, Lithuania
- 2022: exhibition "Forbidden Landscape" at The Samogitian Art Museum, Mykolas Oginskis Palace, Plungė, Lithuania
- 2023: exhibition "Viktoras Paukštelis. Chromatica. Painting (2020–2023)" at M. K. Čiurlionis National Museum Of Art, Kaunas, Lithuania.
- 2024 exhibition "Dissonances", POUSH, Paris, France
- 2025 exhibition "Untitled...after...", VCRB gallery, Antwerp, Belgium

Combined exhibitions:

- 2011: with Tomas Kiauka at I. Simonaityte Public Library, Klaipėda, Lithuania
- 2012: with Tomas Kiauka at the Lithuanian Artists' Association, Vilnius, Lithuania
- 2014: with Tomas Kiaukia at Kėdainiai Polycultural Centre, Kėdainiai, Lithuania
- 2019: with Sigita Maslauskaite at gallery "Kunstkamera", Vilnius, Lithuania

Selected group exhibitions:

- 2013: Donelaitis 2013, Arka Gallery, Vilnius, Lithuania
- 2013: The Anatomy of the 21st Century, Arka Gallery, Vilnius, Lithuania
- 2016: exhibition "WUNDERKAMERAden" in gallery "Meno forma", Kaunas
- 2017: exhibition "Khôra" at Academy of Fine Arts in Gdansk, Poland
- 2018: Art Fair "ArtVilnius'18", Lithuania.
- 2019: exhibition "Carnival" at Pamenkalnis gallery, Vilnius, Lithuania.
- 2019: exhibition "Recommendation" at Klaipėda Culture Communication Center, Klaipėda, Lithuania.
- 2021: "Biennale Européenne des Blancs Manteaux", "La Halle des Blancs Manteaux", Paris, France
- 2023 / 2024: VILNIUS VIBES, Angermuseum, Erfurt, Germany
- 2023 / 2024: 7TH BIENNIAL OF PAINTING, Hrvatsko društvo likovnih umjetnika, Zagreb, Croatia
- 2025: exhibition "Summer in the city", VCRB gallery, Antwerp, Belgium
- 2025 M. K. ČIURLIONIS TODAY: FOREST, SEA, AND…, Palanga Resort Museum, Palanga, Lithuania

Paukstelis presented his animated painting project "Restless Paintings" in Austria, Germany, United States and Sweden

== Discography ==
- 2013: 'Bach Liszt Debussy Victor Paukstelis' (Baltic Optical Disc)
- 2014: 'Bach Lyadov Scriabin Piano Music' (Sheva Collection)
- 2015: 'Rameau Schumann Franck'(Sheva Collection)
- 2020: 'Mozart, Beethoven, Pärt, Chopin' (Sheva Collection)
