= Julien Jalâl Eddine Weiss =

French musician and composer (1953–2015)

- Born: Julien Weiss; October 18, 1953; Paris, France
- Died: January 2, 2015 (aged 61); Paris, France
- Resting place: Père Lachaise Cemetery, Paris, France
- Occupations: Musician, composer
- Known for: Founder of Al-Kindi Ensemble
- Awards: Officer of the Order of Arts and Letters (France)

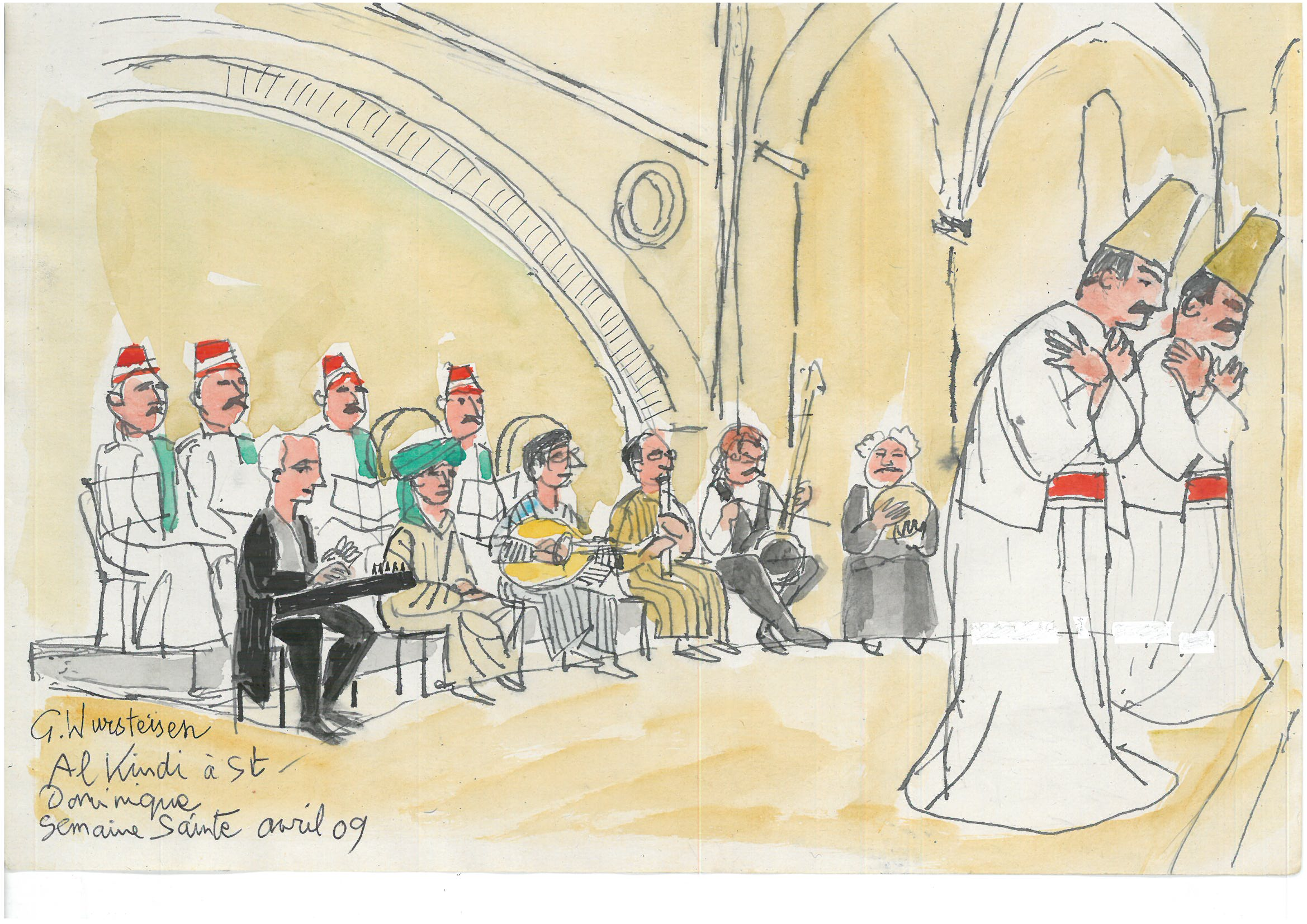
Artistic impression of Julien Weiss with Al Kindi musical group, Festival Art Sacré Perpignan, 2009

Julien Jalâl Eddine Weiss (October 18, 1953 – January 2, 2015) was a French musician, composer and the founder of Al-Kindi Ensemble, a Sufi musical group based in Aleppo, Syria.

== Biography ==
Born Julien Weiss on October 18, 1953, in Paris to a Swiss-German mother and an Alsatian father, he started as a classically trained guitarist, that he had learned at the École Normale de Musique de Paris. As a student in 1976, he was fascinated by classical Arabic music when he met Munir Bachir, the Iraqi grand master of the oud (oriental lute). He then embarked on the study of this instrument and of the refined laws governing oriental micro-tonal music.

Abandoning the oud for the qanûn, a sort of oriental zither, which he learned from masters in various countries of the Middle East, Julien Weiss founded in 1983 the instrumental ensemble Al-Kindi. Initially conceived as a takht (small ensemble of soloists) devoted to Arab classical music. Three years later, in 1986, he converted to Islam and took the name Julien Jalâl Eddine Weiss as an homage to Jalāl ad-Dīn Muhammad Rūmī. During his career, Weiss performed at more than five hundred concerts, notably at the Théâtre de la Ville de Paris, the Institut du Monde arabe in Paris, the Beiteddine Festival in Lebanon, Carnegie Hall in New York, and at Nuits de Fourvière in Lyon, as well as in cities such as Hong Kong, São Paulo, and Washington. In 2001, he was made an Officer of the Order of Arts and Letters by the French Republic. Weiss died of cancer on 2 January 2015 in Paris at the age of 61. He is buried in the Père Lachaise Cemetery in Paris, France.

== Tributes ==
French novelist Mathias Énard cited his death in his novel Boussole (translated into English as Compass).

== See also ==
- Arabic music - Sacred and Art music
- Sufi music
