= Al-Kindi Ensemble =

Sufi musical group

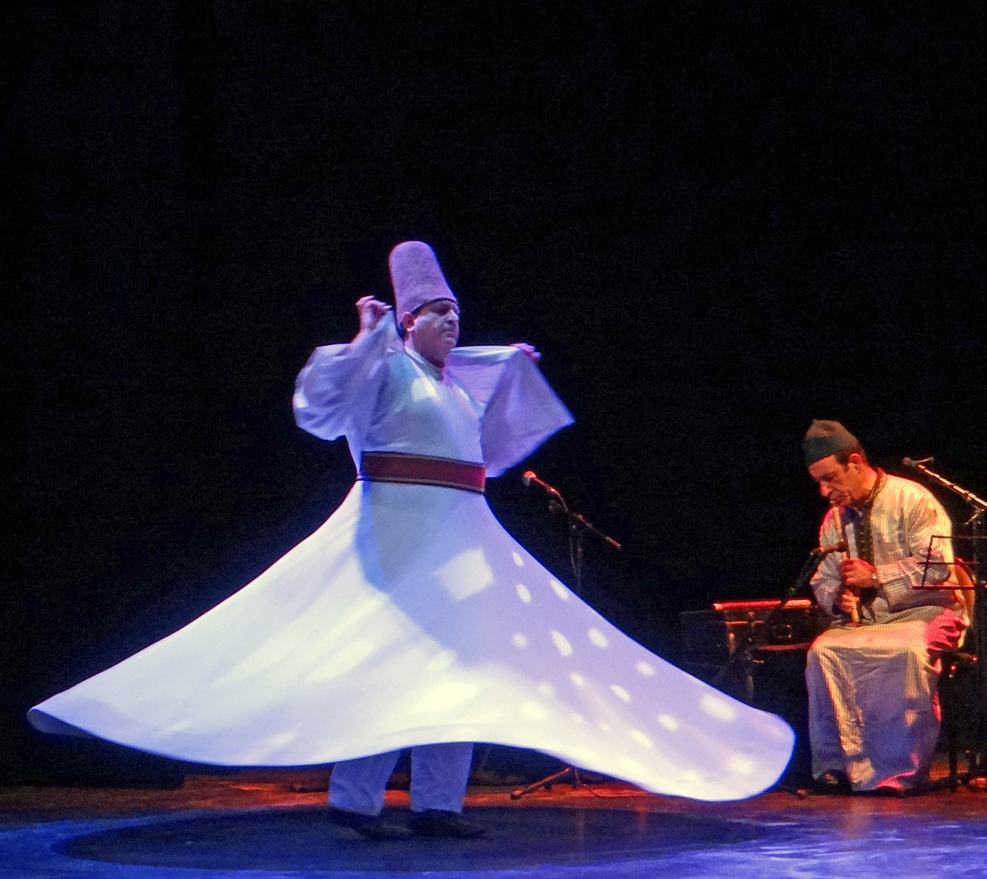
Performance of Al-Kindi Ensemble at the Arab World Institute, Paris

Al-Kindi Ensemble is a Sufi musical group founded in 1983 by Julien Jalâl Eddine Weiss. Based in Aleppo, Syria, Al Kindi Ensemble is known for its interpretations of the Arab-Muslim and Sufi musical traditions.

== History ==
Founded in 1983 in Aleppo by Julien Weiss as a tribute to Al-Kindi, a philosopher and music theorist of Arab world, Al Kindi Ensemble began its journey with the spirit to explore Arab-Andalusian, Oriental, Turkish and Iranian influences in music. The ensemble wanted to acquire a repertoire from the entire Arab world. At the beginning the group consisted of only three instrumentalists. The Egyptian Tar and Riqq player Adel Schams Eldin, Julien Weiss and the Syrian Nay player Ziad Kadhi Amin. Initially, the ensemble only played instrumental pieces. Julien Weiss later decided to expand the group. He traveled to Syria and met with Sheikh Hamza Shakkûr, a well-known singer of classical music. Shakkûr was also the head of the Sufi community of the whirling dervishes. In 1986, Weiss converted to Islam and settled in Aleppo. There he started a collaboration with singers of Arab classical music from Iraq and Syria, such as Adib Dayikh and the Tunisian singer and musician Lotfi Bouchnak.

== Musical style ==
Accompanied by devotional chanting, the group uses multiple instruments such as oud, spike fiddle (joze), ney, percussion and qanun to create their performances. In their concerts, the musicians have been accompanied by whirling dervishes such as Sahin Nasir from Istanbul, Maher and Hatem Al Jamal from Damascus, and Yahyah Hamami and Yousef Shreymo from Aleppo.

== Musicians ==
=== Instrumentalists ===
- Julien Jalâl Eddine Weiss (died in 2015), qanûn player and director of the ensemble
- Adel Shams El Din, Egyptian master of the riqq
- Mohamed Saada (died in 2005), Tunisian ney player and musicologist
- Abd al Salam Safar (died 1999), master of Syrian taqsim and nay player
- Zyad Qadi-Amin, flutist from Damascus
- Mohamed Qadri Dalal, Syrian master of the Ud
- Mohamed Gomar, Iraqi master of the joze
- Ozer Ozel, the lute master from Turkey
- Alem Kasimov, master of the Azerbaijani tar
- Mehmet Refik Kaya, Turkish master of the Sufi and Ottoman rabab
- Osman Oksuzoglu, Turkish master of Ottoman kudüm

=== Singers ===
The Al-Kindî Ensemble has welcomed many solo singers since 1990 including:

- Sheikh Hamza Shakkûr (died in 2008)
- Sabri Moudallal, interpret of religious songs and muezzin of the great mosque of Aleppo (died 2006)
- Adîb Al-Dâyikh (died in 2000), ghazal reciter from Aleppo
- Sheikh Habboush, the leader of the zawiya qaderiya Sufi brotherhood from Aleppo
- Omar Sarmini, Syrian master of the qasidah
- Huseyn Ismail Al Azami, master of the classical Iraqi maqam from Baghdad
- Dogan Dikmen, Ottoman classical singer and professor at Yıldiz University and member of the TRT orchestra in Istanbul
- Bekir Buyukbas, hafiz and muezzin of the Sultan Fethi mosque in Istanbul
- Lotfi Bouchnak, malouf singer from Tunis
- Constantin Angelidis, from Athens, Greece

== Discography ==
- (1988) Arab Classical Music, instrumental trio with Mohamed Saada
- (1993) Classical Songs from Tunisia and the Middle East, with Lotfi Bouchnak
- (1994) Syria: Takasim & Sufi Chants From Damaskus with Hamza Shakkûr
- (1995) The Passion of the Thousand and One Nights with Husayn Ismail Al-Azami
- (1995) Sufi Songs from Damascus with Hamza Shakkûr
- (1998) The Aleppian Music Room with Sabri Moudallal and Omar Sarmini
- (1999) The Whirling Dervishes of Damascus with Hamza Shakkûr
- (2001) The Crusades - Tribute to Prince Ousama Ibn al Mounqidh with Omar Sarmini
- (2003) Aleppian Sufi Transe with Sheikh Habboush
- (2006) Ottoman Perfumes with Dogan Dikmen and Omar Sarmini
- (2011) Arab Music From The Time Of The Crusaders with Omar Sarmini
