= École Normale de Musique de Paris =

French music conservatory

Coordinates: 48°53′02.04″N 02°18′32.76″E

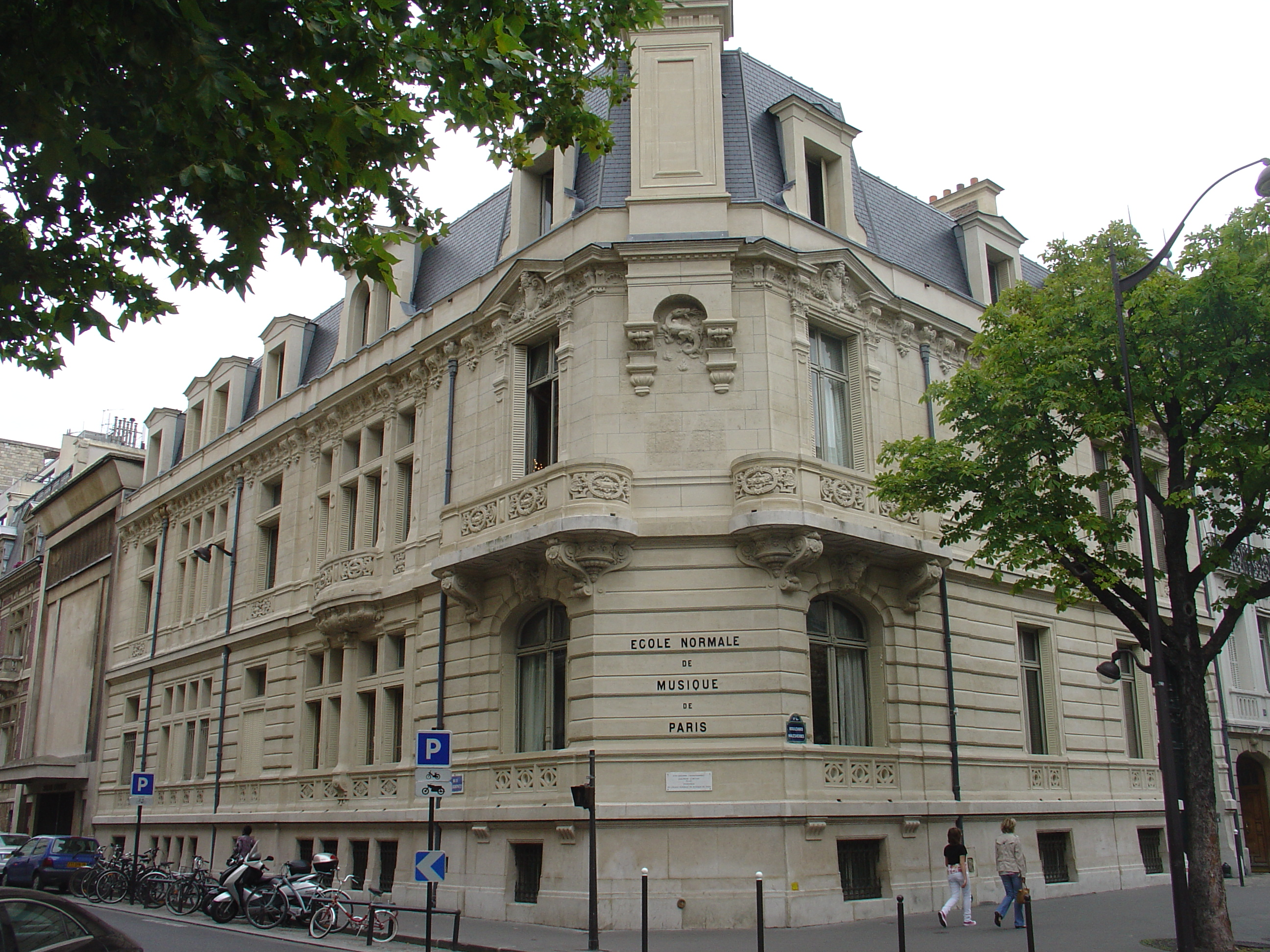
- École Normale de Musique de Paris
- Type: Private
- Established: 1919
- Founders: Auguste Mangeot, Alfred Cortot
- President: Paul Chardon
- Director: Françoise Noël-Marquis
- Students: 1,100
- Location: Paris, Île-de-France, France
- Website: ENMP

The École Normale de Musique de Paris "Alfred Cortot" (ENMP) is a conservatoire located in the 17th arrondissement of Paris. The school was founded in 1919 by Auguste Mangeot and Alfred Cortot. The term école normale (English: normal school) meant a teacher training institution, and the school was intended to produce music teachers as well as concert performers. It is officially recognised by the Ministry of Culture and Communication and is under the patronage of the Ministry of Foreign Affairs. The school is not recognised by the Bologna Process.

== History ==
The École was founded on 6 October 1919 as a private institution by French pianist Alfred Cortot and Auguste Mangeot, director of the magazine Le Monde musical.

In 1927, the school moved from a building in the rue Jouffroy-d'Abbans to 114 bis boulevard Malesherbes, a Belle Époque mansion given by the Marquise of Maleissye, where it is situated to this day.

In 1962, after Cortot's death, composer Pierre Petit became the school's new director. Two years later, 1964, conductor Charles Munch was named school president. In 1968, Henri Dutilleux succeeded Münch's position as president and stayed in office until 1974.

== Management ==
The board of directors included musicians of renowned standing including Elliott Carter and Jean-Michel Damase. Since 1 January 2013, Françoise Noël-Marquis has held the post of director of the school, replacing Henri Heugel.

== Salle Cortot ==
In 1929, the renowned architect Auguste Perret, who also responsible for the Théâtre des Champs-Élysées, designed a new 500-seat concert hall for the school. Named "Salle Cortot" after the school's founder, the hall was designed in the "Art Deco" style. Cortot once described it as: "A hall which sounds like a Stradivarius".

In 2001, a restoration of the Hall was carried out with the support of the French Ministry of Culture and Liliane Bettencourt. Today it hosts more than 160 concerts and musical events every year. Both the Salle Cortot and the school are registered as historical landmarks by the French Administration.

== Teaching ==
Higher education courses include instrumental, vocal, composition, film composition, orchestral conducting, chamber music and piano accompaniment disciplines. Training courses offering individual private lessons with visiting professors are also available upon prior audition. The school also has an intensive and tailored program for gifted musicians ages 11 to 16 who wish to pursue a career in music.

== Les Concerts de Midi & Demi ==
Every Tuesday, Wednesday and Thursday at 12:30, a free concert at Salle Cortot is given by the school's students of higher levels and/or its professors. The concept of the program was started by Jacques Lagarde in 1981 and carried on with the direction of Narcis Bonet. During the 2012-2013 season, Véronique Bonnecaze succeeded Bonet's place as its new artistic director. Since then, the post has been held successively by Franck Tourre and Stéphane Friédérich.

== Public masterclasses ==
Each year a set of public master classes with renowned musicians take place at the Salle Cortot. Notable artists who have lectured include Alfred Cortot himself, Samson François, Mstislav Rostropovich, Thomas Hampson, and, more recently, Anne Queffélec, Inva Mula, Natalia Gutman, Karine Deshayes, François-René Duchâble, Vincent Le Texier, Mikhail Rudy, Barbara Hannigan, Emmanuel Pahud, James Galway, Michel Portal, Maria João Pires, Abdel Rahman El Bacha, András Schiff and Vladimir Cosma.

== Notable alumni and academics ==
Former distinguished members of faculty include Jean-François Antonioli, Narcís Bonet, Pierre Bernac, Nadia Boulanger, Pablo Casals, Alfred Cortot, Georges Dandelot, Nelson Delle-Vigne Fabbri, Paul Dukas, Henri Dutilleux, Georges Enescu, Philippe Entremont, Zino Francescatti, Arthur Honegger, Wanda Landowska, Jean Micault, Charles Munch, Jeannine Richer, Magda Tagliaferro, Yoshihisa Taïra, Jacques Thibaud, France Clidat, Françoise Thinat and Pierre-Henri Xuereb.

Prominent current members of faculty include Rafael Andia, Henri Barda, Erik Berchot, Philippe Bianconi, Régis Campo, Rena Cherechevskaïa, Vladimir Chernov, Henri Demarquette, Caroline Dumas, Marie-Catherine Girod, Anssi Karttunen, Pierre Lénert, David Lively, Jean-Marc Luisada, Roselyne Masset-Lecocq, Patrick Messina, Daniel Ottevaere, Jean-Bernard Pommier, Bruno Rigutto, Eric Tanguy, Beatrice Thiriet, and Ramzi Yassa.

Illustrious alumni include cellists Antonio Janigro and Audrey Piggott; composers İlhan Baran, André Boucourechliev, Elliott Carter, Gabriel Cusson, Jacob Druckman, Alain Gagnon, Gérard Grisey, Jacques Hétu, Simeon ten Holt, Leonid Karev, Sophie Lacaze, Bruno Mantovani, Beatrice Siegrist, Gabriel Yared, Zygmunt Mycielski, Ron Nelson, Nick Norton, Michel Perrault, Marcel Poot, Milton Estévez, Arturo Rodas, Joaquín Rodrigo, Rodica Sutzu, Antoni Szalowski, Julien Jalâl Eddine Weiss, Chris Mary Francine Whittle and Margrit Zimmermann; composers-conductors Vítězslava Kaprálová, Timur Selçuk, Selmi Andak; conductors Charles Bruck, Sylvain Cambreling, Aaron Scott; flutist and Minister of culture of Egypt Ines Abdel-Dayem; harpists Rino Kageyama, Susann McDonald; guitarist Rafael Andia; musicologist Richard Hoppin, ethnomusicologist and Philippine National Artist José Maceda; organists Monique Gendron and Victor Togni; pianists Paul Badura-Skoda, Colette Maze, Jean-Paul Billaud, Richard Cass, Halina Czerny-Stefańska, Dino Ciani, Samson François, Ivan Ilić, Karen Keys, Yvonne Lefébure, Dinu Lipatti, Igor Markevitch, Jean Micault, Anilu Romero, Giuseppe Ciaramella-Vito Soranno, Victor Paukstelis, Caroline Haffner, Florence Delaage, John Robilette, Art Simmons, Siheng Song, François Weigel, Congyu Wang; violinist Eric Rosenblith.
