= Magdeleine Brard =

French pianist (1903–1998)

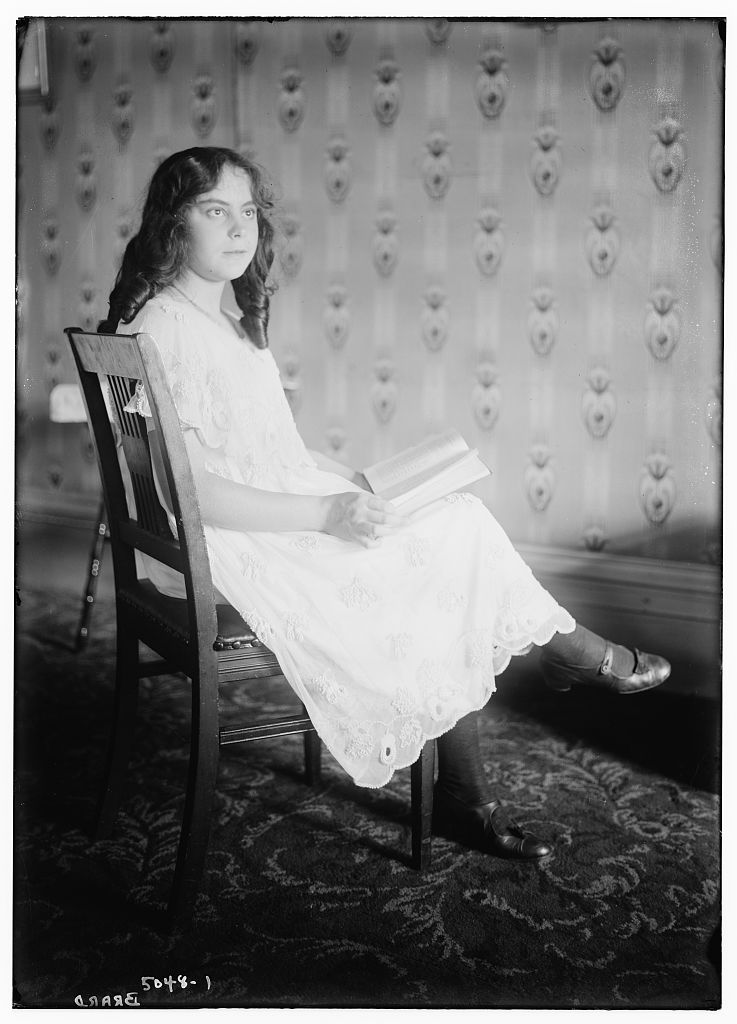
- Magdeleine Brard during her musical career, circa 1919; from the George Grantham Bain News Service collection, Library of Congress.
- Born: Magdeleine Marie Anna Brard; 7 August 1903; Pontivy, Brittany, France
- Died: 3 June 1998 (aged 94)
- Other name: Magda Brard
- Occupation: Pianist

Magdeleine Brard (7 August 1903 – 3 June 1998), also known as Magda Brard, was a French pianist. During the 1930s, she was associated with Benito Mussolini, and under his patronage ran a music school in Turin.

== Early life ==
Magda Marie Anna Brard was born in Pontivy, Brittany, the daughter of Alfred Brard, a businessman and politician. Her brother Roger Brard (1907–1977) became a naval admiral and president of the Societé Mathématique de France. She was a prize-winning student at the Paris Conservatoire, under Alfred Cortot.

== Musical career ==
Magdeleine Brard toured in the United States as a pianist in 1919, sponsored by the French ministry of fine arts. She was possibly the youngest female soloist ever with the Metropolitan Opera when she played there at age 15.

In spring 1922 she gave twenty concerts in France, and returned to the United States for further performances in the autumn of that year. During the 1922 visit, she volunteered as a subject of analysis at the Cleveland School of Character Diagnosis, a clinic interested in the personalities of high achievers. She made piano roll recordings of works by Liszt, Chopin, Schumann, Scriabin, Chabrier, Arensky, Massenet, Fauré, and Saint-Saens in the 1920s, and performed at New York's Hippodrome in 1925.

She played for Benito Mussolini at his Villa Torlonia in 1926, while she was pregnant with her first child. By the following year, they were understood to be lovers, and he demanded that she forgo further musical performances, and forbid the Italian press from covering any events where she performed. There were rumors that she was a French spy, and she was at risk from others in Mussolini's confidence.

In 1933, she opened a music school in Turin. She was director of the "Accademia della musica" from 1933 to 1943. She was arrested in 1945, but freed after intervention from French diplomats, and returned to Paris after the war. She taught Italian in a private school later in life.

== Personal life ==
Magdeleine Brard first married in 1920, to Edmondo Michele Borgo, a wealthy Italian businessman. The Borgos separated in 1936. She had three children, Reginaldo (born 1926), the son of Edmondo Borgo; Vanna (born 1932), believed to be the biological daughter of Benito Mussolini; and Micaela (born 1942), the daughter of Swiss businessman Enrico Wild, whom Brard married in 1945. Wild died in 1955. Magdeleine Brard died in 1998, aged 94 years.
