= Hüseyin Nâzım Pasha =

Ottoman statesman and governor

Hüseyin Nâzım Paşa
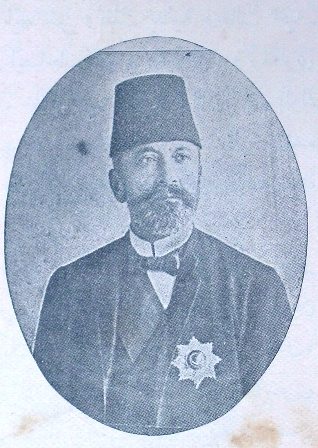
- Born: 1854; Constantinople, Ottoman Empire (now Istanbul, Turkey)
- Died: 1927 (73 years old); Istanbul, Turkey
- Occupation(s): Statesman, author, journalist

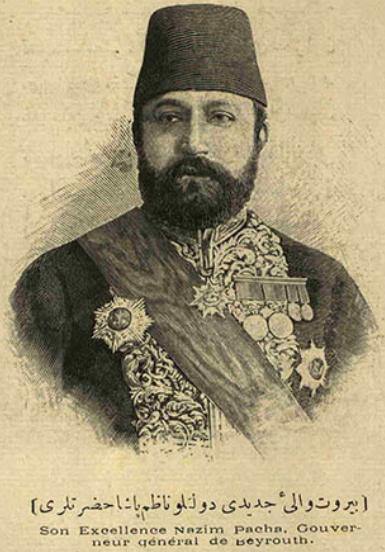
Nazim Pasha, the governor of Beirut Vilayet

Hüseyin Nâzım Pasha (born 1854, Istanbul – d. 1927, Istanbul) was an Ottoman statesman who held governorship positions in the last periods of the Ottoman Empire. He was also an author and a journalist.

He wrote literary articles for a long time in the newspapers İttihat, Tercüman-ı Hakikat, and Takvîm-i Vekayi. He served as the Governor of Beyoğlu and various other provinces.

== Life ==
He was born in Istanbul in 1854. His father Tahsin Efendi, who was from the Batumi dynasty, was one of the civil registry clerks at the Ministry of War.

He studied at Beyazıt High School and took lessons at Beyazid II Mosque. He relocated to Cyprus due to his father's exile. He learned Persian here. On his return to Istanbul, he studied French, algebra, geometry, philosophy, history and geography at Mahrec-i aklâm.

In 1872, at the age of 19, he entered the Tahrîrât-ı Ecnebiye Office. A year later he was sent to Paris to study law. He returned to Istanbul after students from Europe were recalled to the Ottoman Empire and became a clerk at the Tahrîrât-ı Ecnebiye Office once again. After a while, he resigned from this position to work as a journalist.

In 1877, he was appointed as a Turkish teacher at the Galata High School, and later as a clerk of the Turkish Red Crescent and the Komisyon-u Mahsûs. At the end of 1889, he was appointed as the governor of Beyoğlu, and in 1890 as the Minister of War. He received the rank of Vizier in 1894. For health reasons, he was removed from the Ministry of War in 1896. Four months later, he was assigned governor of Beirut and Syria; In 1906, he was appointed as the Deputy Governor of Cezâyir-i Bahr-ı Sefîd. After a while, he was appointed governor of Aydın and Edirne. He was awarded the Osmaniye, Liyakat, and Mecidiye medals, and Hejaz railways medals.

Nâzım Pasha, who died in Istanbul in 1927, was buried in the Karacaahmet Cemetery.

== Literary life ==
In addition to being a statesman, Hüseyin Nâzım Pasha was a poet, writer and translator. He wrote for a long time in the newspapers İttihad, Tercüman-ı Hakikat and Takvîm-i Vekâyi, and published a newspaper called Hülasa-i Efkar. He has two historical plays named Engizisyon Esrarı and Endülüs, and three plays named Aleksaviç, Sohum, and Hicret.

== Works ==
- Hüseyin Nazim Paşa, Hatıralarım. Ermeni Olaylarının İçyüzü. Istanbul: Selis Kitaplar 2003. ISBN 9758724223 (First serialized in the newspaper Yeni Gün in 1931).
