= Muhajreen =

Coordinates: 33°31′31″N 36°16′29″E

Al-Muhajreen المهاجرين
- Municipality
- Al-Muhajreen district in orange
- Country: Syria
- Governorate: Damascus Governorate
- City: Damascus

Population (2004)
  - Total: 55,510
- Time zone: UTC+3 (EET)
  - Summer (DST): UTC+2 (EEST)
- Climate: BSk

Muhajreen (Arabic: المهاجرين, romanized: al-Muhajreen) is a municipality and a neighborhood in the central part of Damascus, Syria, on the slopes of Mount Qasioun. The name means 'the immigrants'. It contains Abu Rummaneh, Al-Haboubi, Al-Maliki, Al-Marabit, Al-Mastaba, Al-Rawda and Shura.

== History ==
The village was first settled by Cretan Muslim immigrants in the late 19th century after they fled Crete, and was initially a suburb on the mountain.

The neighbourhood houses the Muhajreen Palace, the palace of the first president of Syria, which later became a state guest house of the Syrian government.
