= Gabrielle Gills =

French operatic soprano

Gabrielle Gills (born 1880) was a French operatic soprano.

== Biography ==
Gabrielle Gills
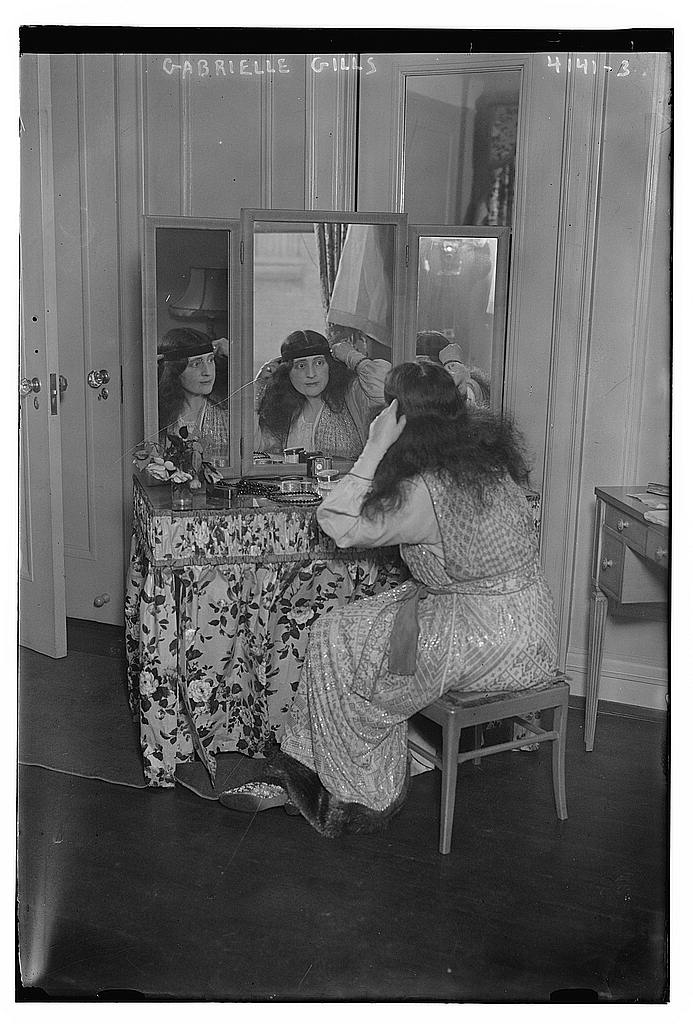
- Born: 1850
- Died: 1950

She was born in 1880 in France. Her first United States musical performance was in 1917 when she was brought from Paris, France by Otto Hermann Kahn, who was a wealthy financier and president of the Metropolitan Opera.

In 1917, after one of her New York recitals, she was described in the newspaper as "an artist of rare powers and accomplishment, wholly representative of the most characteristic features of French art."

She performed at New York's Metropolitan Opera House in concert on February 25, 1917 conducted by Richard Hageman.
