= Spéranza Calo-Séailles =

Greek painter, singer (1885–1949)

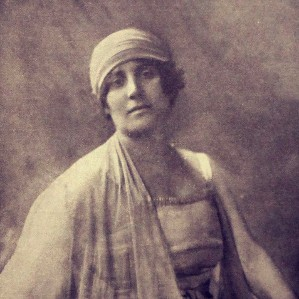
- December 1919 from "Monde Musical"
- Born: Elpís Kalogeropoúlou; 17 May 1885: Constantinople; (modern-day Istanbul, Turkey)
- Died: 18 February 1949 (aged 63); Paris, France
- Occupation: Mezzo-soprano
- Known for: inventing a type of cement

Spéranza Calo-Séailles or Elpís Kalogeropoúlou (Greek: Ελπίς Καλογεροπούλου; 17 May 1885 – 18 February 1949) was a Greek painter, inventor and opera singer. Though better known as a singer and artist, she also invented a type of decorative concrete which went under the name Lap.

== Life ==
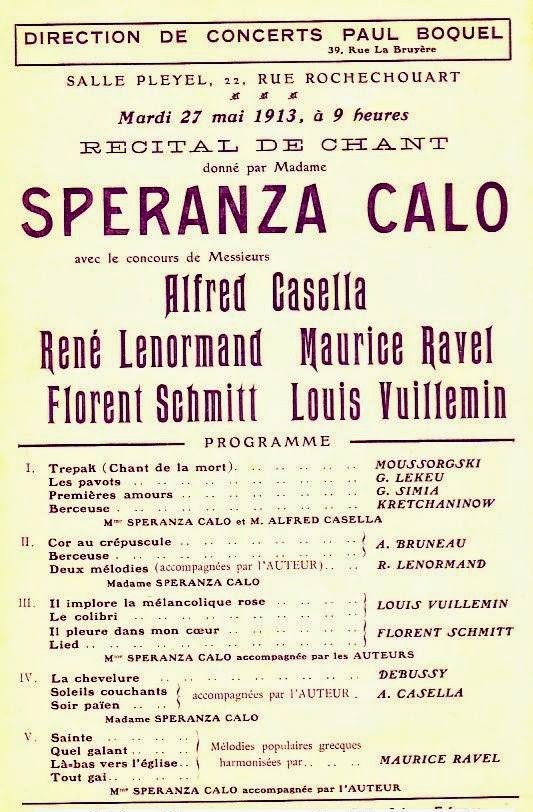
1913 Publicity for Spéranza Calo-Séailles

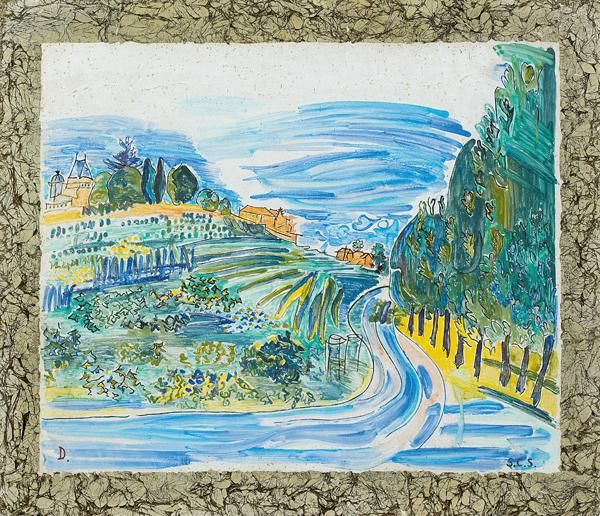
by Spéranza Calo-Séailles

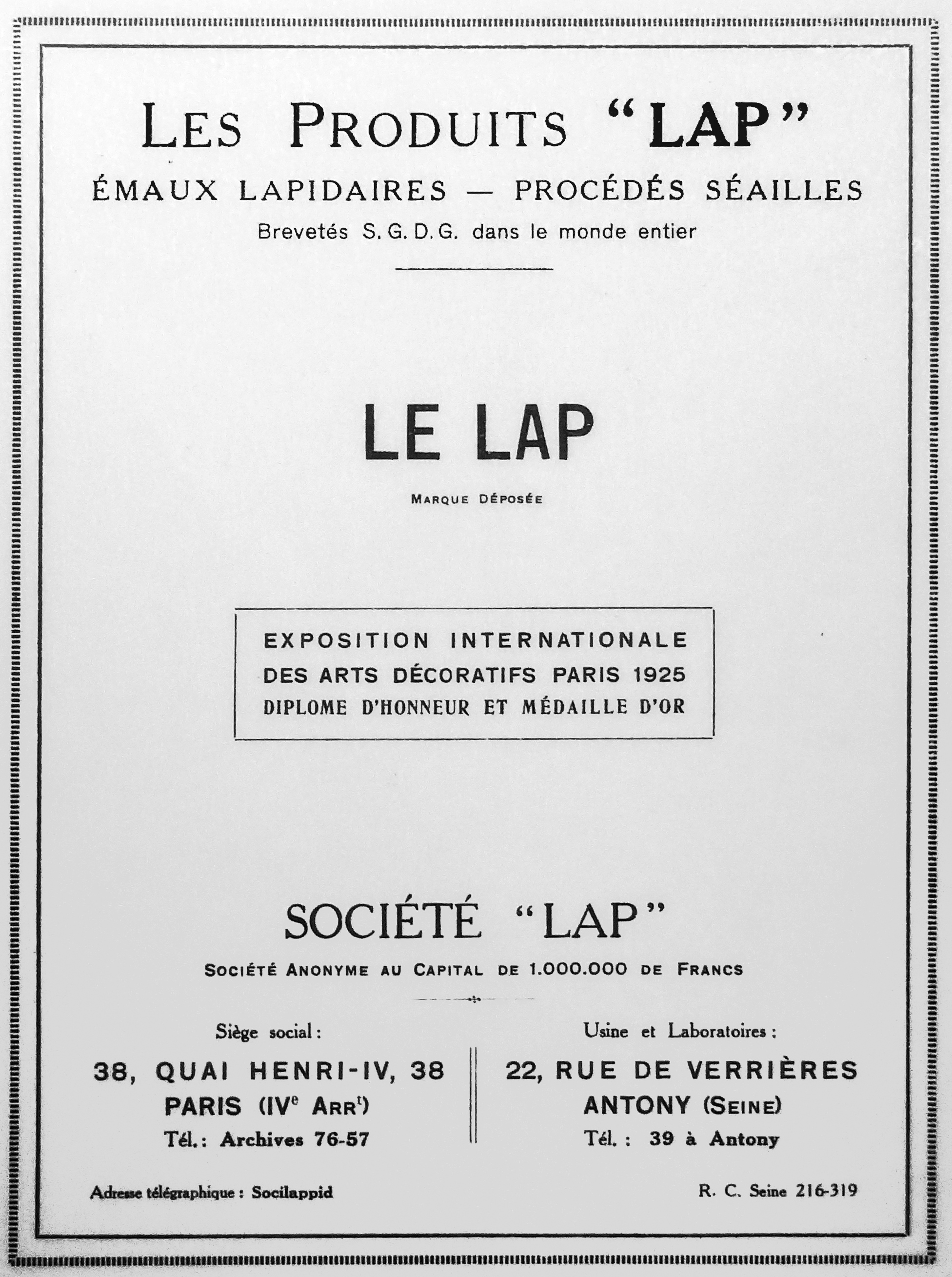
The Lap Society of 1,000,000 francs

Calo-Séailles was born in Constantinople in 1885 as Elpís Kalogeropoúlou. She first attracted attention as a mezzo-soprano and she acquired a patron who was willing to support her development. In 1923 she invented a type of decorative concrete and a patent was applied for in June 1923. The new material which went under the name Lap. Her invention was developed by her and her husband who was a Sorbonne Professor. In 1929 her Lap materials was used in the construction and decoration of the Halles de Boulongrin in Rheims. They provided a challenge when the building was renovated in 2012 and the panels were replaced with GR. In 1930 she was creating work using Lap with Tsuguharu Foujita. Foujita made her portrait and also created several works in Lap at the company's base in Antony.

== Famous artwork ==
Speranza Calo-Séailles was a Greek Impressionist & Modern artist who was born in 1885. Her work has been offered at auction multiple times, with realized prices ranging from 5,866 USD to 41,929 USD, depending on the size and medium of the artwork. Since 2018 the record price for this artist at auction is 41,929 USD for White Cat; & Kitten, blue and gold background, sold at Christie's Hong Kong in 2020. The artist died in 1949.

== Contributions and recognition ==
She showcased the works of various Greek composers, such as Émile Riadis, Dimitri Levidis, Petro Petridis, Georges Poniridy, Mario Varvoglis, and others. Her dedication extended to disseminating Greek Byzantine music and supporting contemporary Greek composers who studied in Europe or Russia. Notably, Calo-Séailles played a crucial role in introducing the works of Manolis Kalomiris, a prominent figure in the Neo-Hellenic Musical School, to French audiences. She performed Kalomiris's compositions in her concerts, and their artistic relationship was so significant that Kalomiris visited Paris to conduct his works and reciprocally, Gabriel Pierné, a French composer, conducted concerts in Athens. In 1939, Calo-Séailles and Kalomiris became in-laws through the marriage of their children.

Calo-Séailles' influence reached diplomatic circles, with Greek Prime Minister Eleftherios Venizelos attending her recitals in 1919 during the Paris Conference negotiations. Elena Venizelos, the prime minister's second wife, also attended performances by Calo-Séailles. In addition to performing Byzantine hymns and classical Greek music, Calo-Séailles regularly presented popular Greek melodies, both unaccompanied and harmonized by Greek and French composers, including Maurice Ravel. Her voice was praised for its beauty and expressive force in translating the dramatic accents of popular songs.

Throughout her career, Calo-Séailles participated in conferences on Hellenic music alongside notable figures like Hubert Pernot, Maurice Emmanuel, and Melpo Logotheti. Her contributions to the promotion of Greek music in France were extensive, and she left a lasting impact on the cultural exchange between Greece and France.

== Private life ==
In February 1913, Spéranza Calo married Jean Charles Séailles, son of the renowned Sorbonne philosophy professor Gabriel Séailles and painter Octavie-Charles Paul-Séailles. They settled in Antony, residing at 22 rue de Verrières (later 54 avenue du Bois de Verrières), which included a beautiful property with an old residence and a well-tended garden. The couple had four children: Jean, Simone, Pierre, and Violette.

During World War II, all the children, except Violette, joined the Resistance without initially informing their mother. Simone and Pierre distinguished themselves in the Sylvestre-Farmer network, while Jean and his wife Krino participated in the Saint-Mars-du-Désert maquis in Mayenne. Tragically, Simone was arrested by the Gestapo in 1944, leading to her deportation to Ravensbrück, where she perished (number 47.182). The family paid a heavy price for their involvement in the Resistance.

Simone's death profoundly affected Spéranza Calo, who would soon follow her daughter into the afterlife. The family, including Spéranza, her husband, and their two daughters, rests in a family vault in the old cemetery of Antony. Simone Séailles is commemorated by a street named after her in Antony. The family's wartime contributions are honored with various decorations, though their sacrifice reflects the harsh realities of the era.

== Awards and record prices ==
The 2023 record price for Speranza Calo-Séailles was for Le champ de course. The 2020 record price for Speranza Calo-Séailles was for White Cat; & Kitten, blue and gold background. The 2018 record price for Speranza Calo-Séailles was for "Vente aux enchères ".
