= Alfred Cortot =

French pianist (1877–1962)

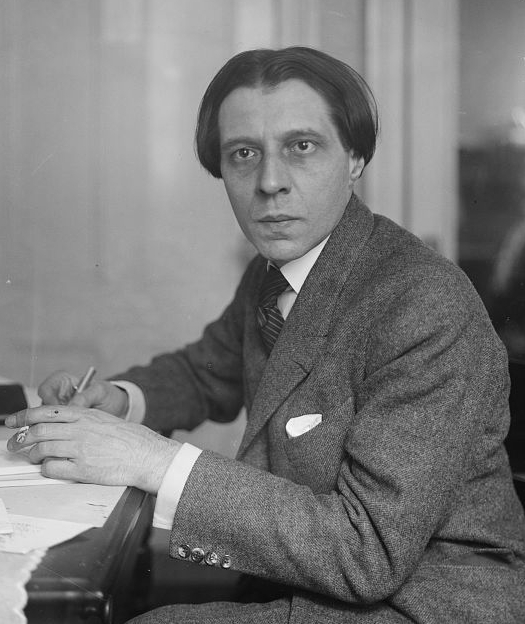
- Cortot, c. 1920s
- Born: Alfred Denis Cortot; 26 September 1877; Nyon, Vaud, Switzerland
- Died: 15 June 1962 (aged 84); Lausanne, Vaud, Switzerland
- Occupations: Classical pianist; conductor; academic teacher; music editor
- Organizations: École Normale de Musique de Paris

Alfred Denis Cortot (Note: Also spelled Cortôt in French.) (English: /kɔːrˈtoʊ/ kor-TOH, French: [alfʁɛd dəni kɔʁto]; 26 September 1877 – 15 June 1962) was a Swiss pianist, conductor, and teacher who lived and worked in France for many years. He was one of the most renowned classical musicians of the 20th century. A pianist of massive repertory, he was especially valued for his poetic insight into Romantic piano works, particularly those of Chopin, Franck, Saint-Saëns and Schumann. For Éditions Durand, he edited editions of almost all piano music by Chopin, Liszt and Schumann.

A central figure of the French musical culture in his time, he was well known for his piano trio with violinist Jacques Thibaud and cellist Pablo Casals.

== Biography ==
=== Early life ===
Cortot was born in Nyon, Vaud, in the French-speaking part of Switzerland, to a French father and a Swiss mother. His nationality was French. His first cousin was the composer Edgard Varèse. He studied at the Paris Conservatoire with Émile Decombes (a student of Frédéric Chopin), and with Louis Diémer, taking a premier prix in 1896. He made his debut at the Concerts Colonne in 1897, playing Beethoven's Piano Concerto No. 3.

Between 1898 and 1901 he was a choral coach and subsequently an assistant conductor at the Bayreuth Festival. In 1902 he conducted the Paris premiere of Wagner's music drama Götterdämmerung (The Twilight of the Gods). He formed a concert society named Société des Concerts to perform Wagner's Parsifal, Beethoven's Missa solemnis, Brahms' German Requiem, and new works by French composers.

=== Career ===
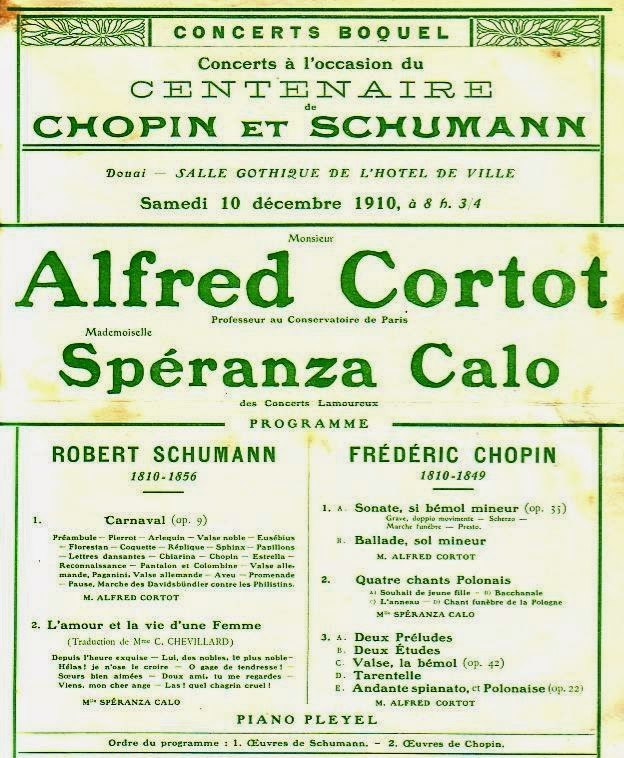
In concert with Spéranza Calo-Séailles

In 1905, Cortot formed a trio with Jacques Thibaud and Pablo Casals, which established itself as the leading piano trio of its era. In 1907, he was appointed Professor by Gabriel Fauré at the Conservatoire de Paris, replacing Raoul Pugno. He continued to teach at the Paris Conservatoire until 1923, where his pupils included Yvonne Lefébure, Vlado Perlemuter, Simone Plé-Caussade, Magdeleine Brard, Marguerite Monnot, and Rodica Sutzu.

In 1919, Cortot founded the École Normale de Musique de Paris. His courses in musical interpretation were highly regarded. For his many notable students, see here.

As a leading musical figure, Cortot traveled for many international music events. The French government sponsored two promotional tours to the United States and one to the Soviet Union in 1920. He conducted several orchestras and was often called upon to provide piano accompaniment for touring artists when in Paris. He was involved in music until his health failed, and taught master classes in piano in his advanced years.

On 21 March 1925, Cortot made the world's first commercial electrical recording of classical music for the Victor Talking Machine Company in Camden, New Jersey: Chopin's Impromptus and Schubert's Litanei, issued on Victor's Red Seal label.

=== World War II ===
During World War II, he accepted the position of Haut-Commissaire ("High Commissioner") for arts in the Vichy government and served twice (1941 and 1942) as a member of the Vichy's Conseil national ("National Council"). However, before this he took a strong stance in defending the French music tradition with the Beaux Arts administration (Fine Arts) supporting soldiers with music. Cortot had to leave this position after Pétain's appointment and exerted his energy instead into writing reports about cultural propaganda and defending French musical styles. He was charged with musical reform by the Pétain government, and the Vichy took control of musical activities. He became part of the comité d'organisation professionelle de la musique (The committee for the professional organisation of music) in 1942 and worked with Laval and Pétain.

In 1941 he participated in a Propaganda Staffel (Propaganda Squad) festival in Paris, and in 1942 played with Wilhelm Kempff for Nazi artist Arno Breker's art exposition, later meeting with Breker at Paul Morand's home. Pierre Laval was also present. Morand had a statue made of Cortot after his impression. He participated in official concerts in Paris during the occupation as well as in Germany in 1942.

Daisy Fancourt writes:

Indeed, in February 1943 Cortot had argued that musicians should not take part in the Service du travail obligatoire (Compulsory work service) introduced by Hitler, as it might compromise their future musical career. He had also called for musical prisoners to be able to join German orchestras. In May 1943 he had even succeeded in liberating twenty musician prisoners. His work extended to fighting in favour of Jewish musicians, such as the Polish soprano Marya Freund: after she was arrested in 1944 and moved to Drancy, Cortot helped to get her transferred to a hospital where she survived and escaped. Cortot was also not French, but Swiss, and claimed never to have felt the same nationalistic sentiment towards France that caused many other French musicians to flee the Nazis and emigrate to the US. He was married (although estranged) to a woman of Jewish origin, and was friends with Jewish intellectuals such as Leon Blum, the first Jewish Prime Minister of France.

After the war's conclusion, Cortot was found guilty by a French government panel of collaboration with the enemy and was suspended from performing for a year. He said in his defence, "I've given 50 years of my life to helping the French cause [...] when I was asked to become involved with the interests of my comrades, I felt I couldn't refuse. [...] I represented the interests of the French government less than the interests of France. [...] I have never been involved in politics." Once the suspension expired he returned to performing more than 100 concerts a season.

=== Death ===
Cortot died on 15 June 1962, aged 84, of uremia from kidney failure in Lausanne, Switzerland. His son was the painter, Jean Cortot.

== Contribution ==
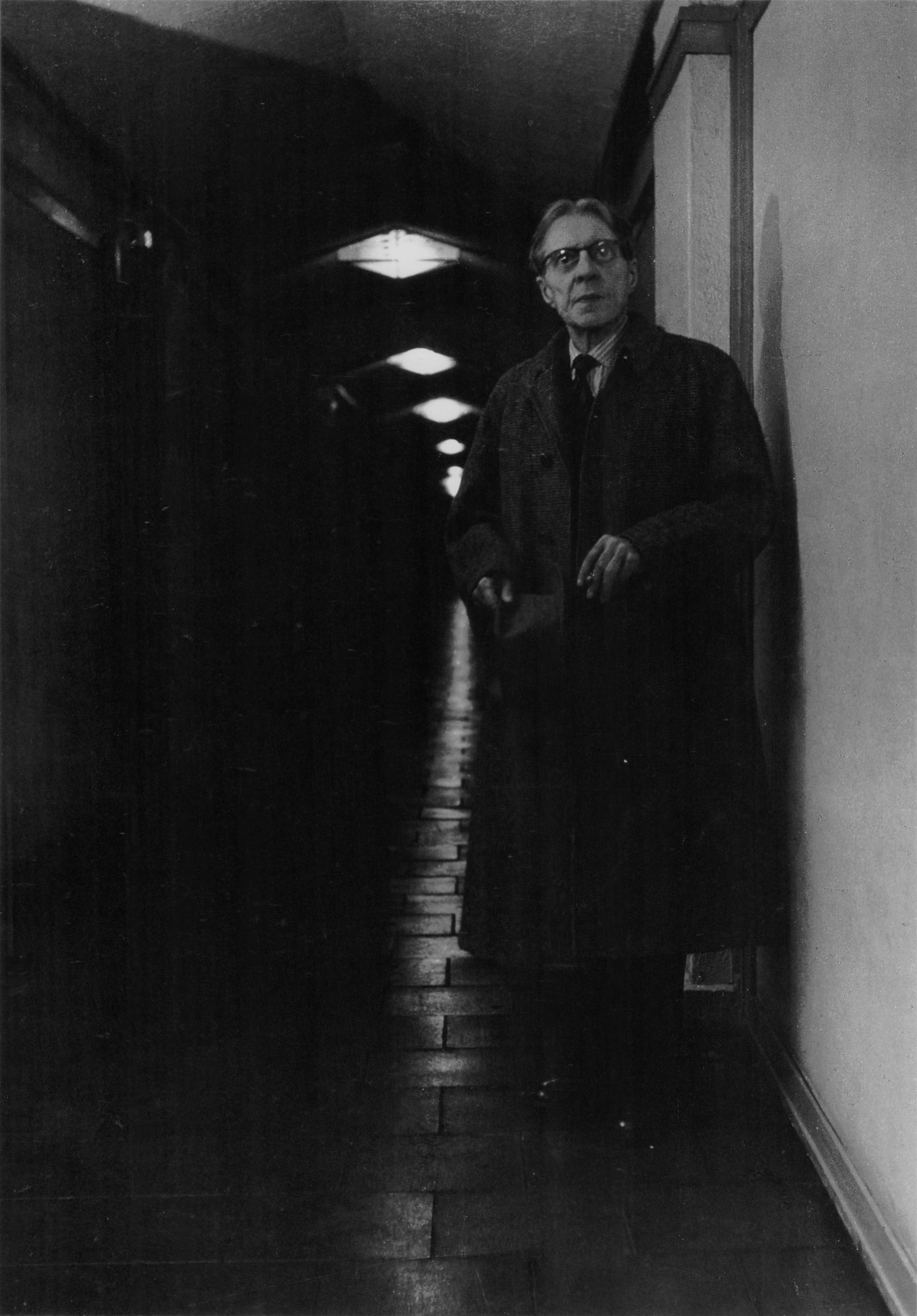
Cortot in 1953, by Shōji Ōtake

As one of the most celebrated piano interpreters of Chopin, Schumann and Debussy, Cortot produced printed editions of the piano works of all three, notable for their inclusion of meticulous commentary on technical problems and matters of interpretation.

Cortot suffered from memory lapses in concert (particularly notable from the 1940s onwards) and often left wrong notes on his later records. When in form, however, he showed a brilliant technique that could handle almost any kind of pianism. This gift is evident in his legendary recordings of Liszt's Sonata in B minor (the first recording ever made of the work) and Saint-Saëns' Etude en forme de valse. The latter thoroughly impressed Vladimir Horowitz, who – according to Cortot – approached Cortot to learn his "secret" in performing it; Cortot, however, did not divulge it to him.

He also wrote a good deal of didactic prose, including a piano primer: Rational Principles of Pianoforte Technique. This book contains many finger exercises to aid in the development of various aspects of piano playing technique.

== Bibliography ==
- Cortot, Alfred, La musique française de piano, 1930–48
- —, Cours d'interprétation, 1934 (Studies in Musical Interpretation, 1937)
- —, Aspects de Chopin, 1949 (In Search of Chopin, 1951)
- —, Grundbegriffe der Klaviertechnik, 1928

== Sources ==
- Gavoty, Bernard, Alfred Cortot, 1977 (in French)
- Manshardt, Thomas, Aspects of Cortot, 1994
