= Yvonne Lefébure =

French pianist and teacher

- Born: 29 June 1898; Ermont, France
- Died: 23 January 1986 (aged 87); Paris, France
- Occupations: Pianist, pedagogue

Yvonne Lefébure (29 June 1898 – 23 January 1986, Paris) was a French pianist and teacher.

== Early life and education ==
Lefébure began studying piano with a local teacher. In 1906, she was introduced to Marguerite Long, who advised her parents to pursue serious musical training. She entered the Paris Conservatoire, where she won a gold medal in the Concours des Petits Prodiges at the age of nine and a premier prix in Alfred Cortot's class at fourteen with Beethoven’s Appassionata Sonata, Op. 57.

She debuted with the Orchestre Lamoureux under Camille Chevillard, performing Saint-Saëns’s Piano Concerto No. 2 in G minor. However, her mother was concerned with overexposure and encouraged her to return to her studies at the Conservatoire. She went on to earn first prizes in piano, harmony, counterpoint, accompaniment, and fugue.

== Performing career ==
Despite her early success, Lefébure later stated that she had to relearn her piano technique, which she accomplished independently. This realization significantly influenced her teaching approach.

She continued to perform actively, debuting in England in 1933 at Wigmore Hall. Post–World War II, she appeared in the United States, including a recital at New York’s Town Hall.

In 1950, Pablo Casals invited her to perform at the first Prades Festival. She collaborated regularly with Casals and violinist Sándor Végh, performing Beethoven’s complete violin sonatas.

== Teaching ==
At age 26, Lefébure began teaching at Alfred Cortot’s École Normale de Musique, remaining there until World War II. After the war, she taught at the Paris Conservatoire from 1952 to 1967. Her notable students include Catherine Collard, Imogen Cooper, Dinu Lipatti, Samson François, Janina Fialkowska and Denise Roger.

In 1964, she founded the Juillet Musical de Saint-Germain-en-Laye, where she taught interpretation masterclasses.

== Legacy and discography ==
Lefébure championed French music and worked closely with composers like Maurice Emmanuel and Ravel. Her repertoire included works by Bach, Beethoven, Chopin, Schumann, Liszt, and Dukas.

She recorded for HMV, Le Chant du Monde, EMI, and Solstice, with many recordings later reissued on CD. Highlights include Beethoven’s late sonatas and the Diabelli Variations, as well as live performances with Wilhelm Furtwängler and the Berlin Philharmonic.

Following her death, an international piano competition was established in her name.

== Honors and Awards ==
- Officer of the Order of the Legion of Honour
- Grand Cross of the Ordre National du Mérite
