= Géry Moutier =

French classical pianist (born 1957)

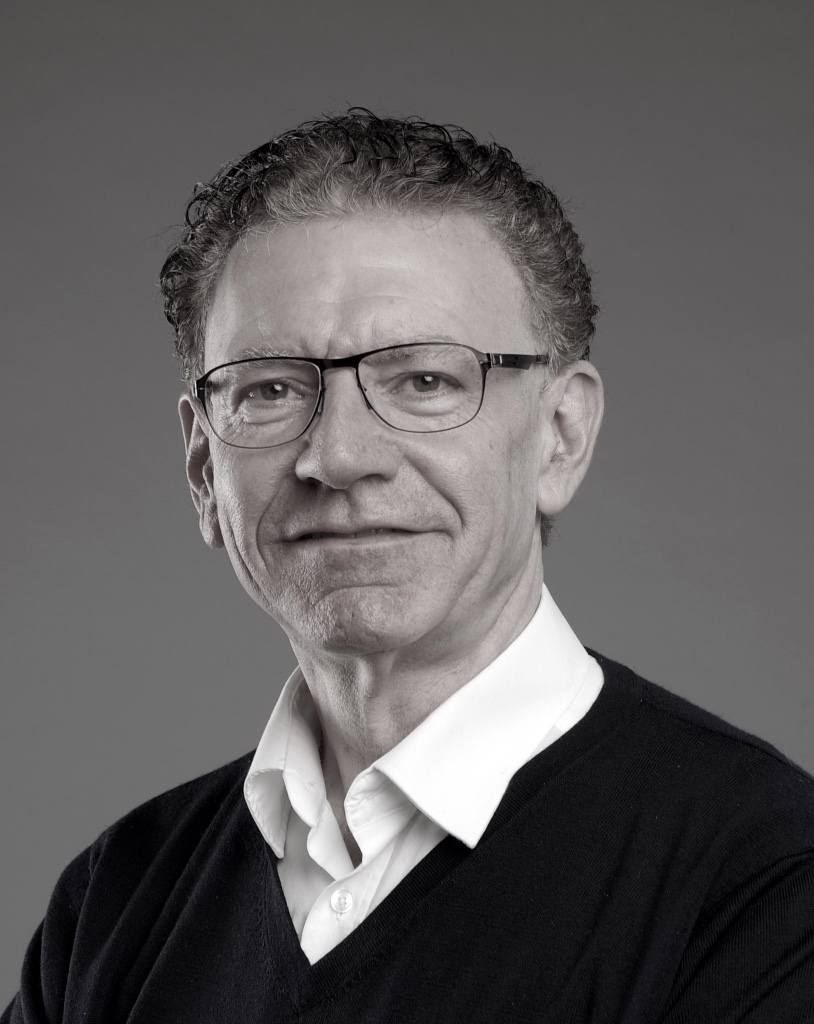
Géry Moutier

Géry Moutier (born 1957) is a French classical pianist, music educator, and director.

== Life ==
Born in Normandy in 1957, Moutier explored the piano at the age of four, with a mother who loved literature and a father - a graduate of the Van Der Kelen Institute - who was passionate about painting and architecture. Noticed by Tasso Janopoulo (partner of Jacques Thibaud), he immersed himself in the world of poetic song from the Paris of the sixties. At the age of eleven, he played at the Théâtre des Champs-Élysées with the Orchestre national d'Île-de-France and then with the Orchestre national de France. Received at thirteen years old at the Conservatoire de Paris (piano and chamber music, writing), Moutier first studied with Lucette Descaves. She passed on to him the heritage of Yves Nat, her knowledge of French music, and invited him to work as closely as possible with living composers. He explored the repertoire of chamber music with Jean Hubeau and Geneviève Joy-Dutilleux. After his First Prizes, he was received in a cycle of improvement where Reine Gianoli introduced him to the universe of Robert Schumann and transmitted to him her attachment - received from Edwin Fischer - to the work of Johann Sebastian Bach. She presented him to Paul Badura-Skoda. The meetings with György Sebők, Dmitri Bashkirov, then work with many conductors and composers determined his future.

A laureate of the Cleveland International Piano Competition, and Long-Thibaud-Crespin Competition, he was received on the day of his nineteenth birthday as a solo performer at Radio France. He was requested by Aldo Ciccolini to assist him at the Conservatoire de Paris where he became the youngest permanent teacher at the age of 22. Elected to the conservatory's bodies, he was involved in the reflection concerning the transfer of the establishment to the Cité de la Musique. Professor and keyboard coordinator at the conservatoire à rayonnement régional de Reims, Moutier then took over the direction of the Conservatory of Maisons-Alfort for seven years, where he gathered the teaching team around the link between education and culture, essential for the development of the child, and led the musical programming of the Theatre and the library in the same city.

He returned to higher education in 1997 as a permanent professor at the Conservatoire national supérieur de musique et de danse de Lyon where he founded and developed the keyboard department. He participates in major academies in Europe and Asia, is a guest in master classes at major universities and conservatories where he tirelessly encourages young musicians in their vocation and their need to share, often to the best international awards. Several first prizes in the Orléans Piano XXth century International Competition (including Florence Cioccolani, Wilhem Latchoumia, Maroussia Gentet), from his class at the CNSMD in Lyon, illustrate his commitment to contemporary creation.

His concerts have taken him to Rome (notably to the Villa Médicis), Prague, Moscow, Budapest, Vienna, Montreal, Seoul, etc. Moutier shared the stage with Gérard Jarry, Olivier Charlier, Raphaël Oleg, Boris Garlitsky, Amy Flammer, Roland Daugareil, Laurent Korcia, Dong-Suk Kang, Gérard Poulet, Tasso Adamopoulos, Bruno Pasquier, Pierre-Henri Xuereb, Michel Michalakakos, Gary Hoffman, Roland Pidoux, Philippe Muller, Alain Meunier, Jacques Di Donato, Alain Marion, Vincent Lucas, Philippe Pierlot, and with the Rosamonde, Ludwig and Castagneri string quartets.

On 1 September 2009, Moutier was appointed director of the Conservatoire national supérieur musique et danse de Lyon, establishment he will leave after three terms. While putting training by the stage at the heart of the curriculum he developed the Doctorate of Music Research and Practice, the international programs of artistic creation InMics and CoPeCO, numerous professional production and distribution partnerships (major festivals, orchestras, opera, companies, creation centres, CCN, Biennales), the renewal of musical and stage creation forms with other art schools (École nationale supérieure des arts et techniques du théâtre, Ensbal, Ensal, Cinéfabrique), and links with leading scientific and social science schools (co-founder of the CHELS with ENS, Sciences-Po, Ecole Centrale, VetAgro Sup).

Moutier has had the institution's real estate extension project approved, voted to extend mediation training to all students and adopted one of the first W/M Equality Charters for the institutions of the French Ministry of Culture.

Father of four children, including the trombonist Nicolas Moutier, Moutier is married to Hélène Bouchez, conductor.

== Awards ==
By decree of August 31, 2018, Moutier was promoted to the rank of Officer of the Ordre des Arts et des Lettres.

== Bibliography ==
- Rémy Campos (2016). Entretien avec Géry Moutier. Paris: L'Œil d'or. ISBN 978-2-913661-79-0.
- François Sabatier (2005). Questions à Géry Moutier. Lyon: Symétrie. pp. 172–173. ISBN 2-914373-19-8.
