= Nathalie Béra-Tagrine =

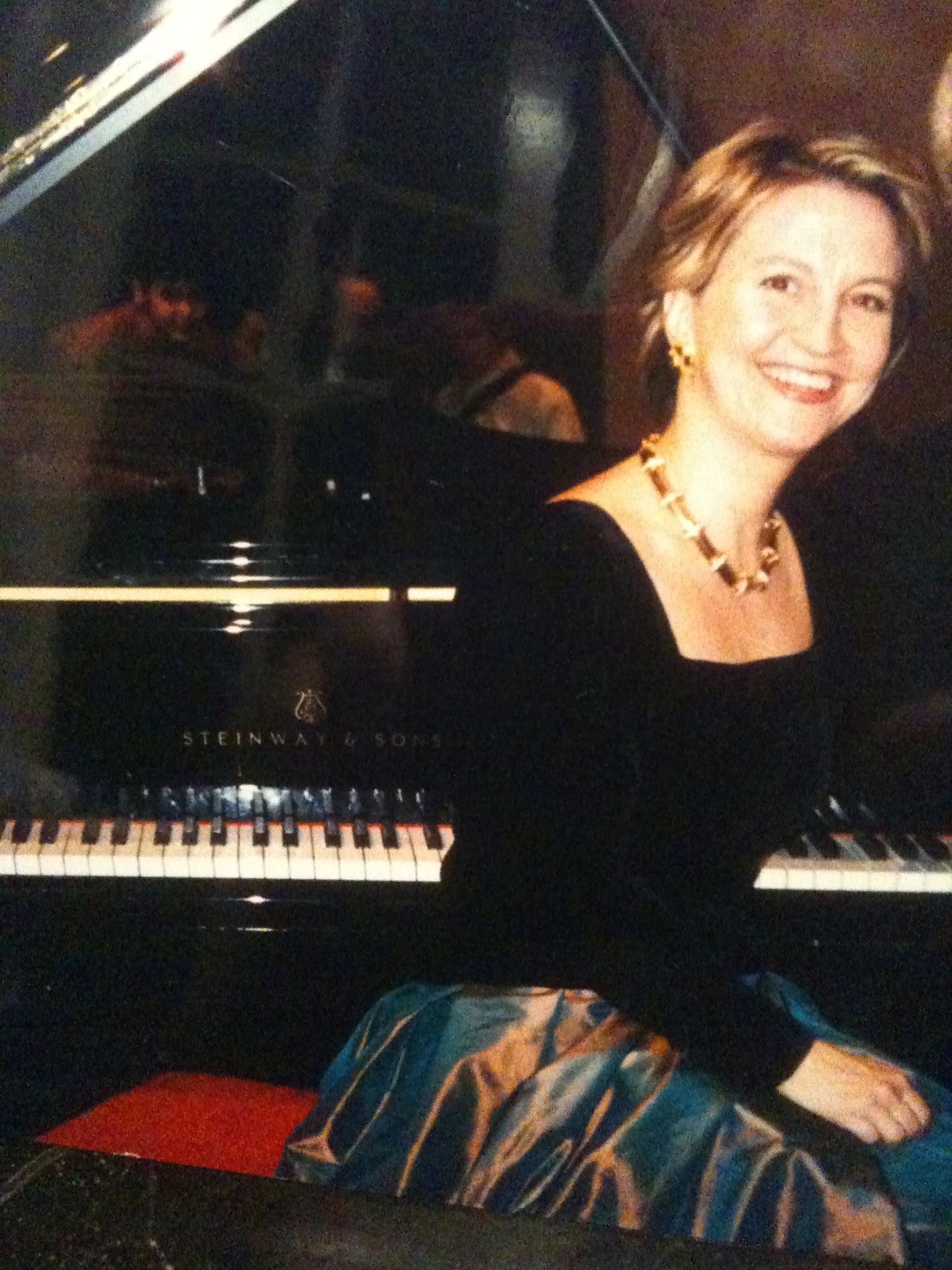

Background information
- Born: 15 February 1960 (age 66)

Nathalie Béra-Tagrine (born 15 February 1960) is a French classical pianist of Russian descent.

== Early life and career ==
Born in Boulogne-Billancourt, Béra-Tagrine learned to play the piano from the age of 3 1/2 under her the direction of her mother, pianist Nadia Tagrine.

At eleven years old, finishing her schooling with a 1st prize at the Schola Cantorum de Paris in the class of Nadia Tagrine, she entered the Conservatoire de Paris in the specialized solfeggio class of Berthe Duru where she obtained a 1st medal. The same year, she won a 1st prize unanimously in Superior at the "Kingdom of Music". This prize offered her the opportunity to play at the Salle Pleyel in Paris as soloist with the orchestra of the ORTF, under the direction of Pol Mule.

The year she turned twelve, she was unanimously awarded the Prix d'honneur at the Léopold Bellan national competition and a few months later entered first nominated in the Conservatory's higher piano classes of Lucette Descaves. She also followed the teaching of Jean Hubeau in chamber music, Jacqueline Robin in deciphering, Françoise Rieunier in musical analysis and Jeannine Rueff as well as Roger Boutry for harmony. In the following years, she played several times at the Théâtre des Champs-Élysées in the framework of the "Musigrains", in recital or with orchestra.

At sixteen, she won 1st prizes at the Conservatoire for piano and for chamber music.

At seventeen, she won the First Prize at the Cleveland International Piano Competition (USA).

The same year she was received at the Conservatory in cycle of perfection of piano (class of Ventsislav Yankov, assistant Nadia Tagrine) and chamber music (class of Jean Hubeau). Her young career was then enriched by numerous engagements in France and abroad (Europe, the United States, Japan) as well as broadcasts in various French and international radio and television stations.

While continuing to work with Nadia Tagrine, she enriched her repertoire through meetings with masters such as György Sebők, Vlado Perlemuter, Manuel Rosenthal, Gaby Casadesus, Lili Kraus, Dmitri Bashkirov and Sulamita Aronovsky.

== Awards and recognitions ==
Other awards will be added to her list of achievements:

- 1977 – Artist-soloist of Radio France.
- 1979 – 2nd prize of the Épinal International Piano Competition.
- 1981 – Grand prix Bruce Hungerford at the Young Concert Artists in New York city – (USA)
- 1983 – 1st nominated at the Clara Haskil International Piano Competition (Montreux-Vevey)
- 1983 – 3rd grand prix of the Chopin competition of Majorca (Spain)

Married since 1979 to Bertrand Mercier, a Polytechnician engineer and Doctor of Science, she spent 25 years as an international concert performer, mother of four children and teacher.

She is the soloist for major orchestras such as the Cleveland Orchestra and the Orchestre national de Lille and performs among others, under the direction of Lorin Maazel, Jean-Claude Casadesus, Philippe Bender, Sylvain Cambreling, Paul Staicu and Trajan Popesco.

Her chamber music partners are flutists Jean-Pierre Rampal and Shigenuri Kudo, cellists Maurice Baquet, Dominique de Williencourt, Cécilia Tsan, violinists Alexandre Schneider, Devy Erlih, Olivier Charlier, Annick Roussin, violinist Geneviève Laurenceau, harpist Lily Laskine, and soprano Ariane Douguet.

Since 2000, she has gradually moved away from the international scene to devote more time to her children and the teaching that fascinates her.

In September 2011 and June 2012, volumes 1 and 2 of the Tagrine Method were published by Van de Velde which pass on the teaching she received from her mother. She composed the pieces.

In January 2016, four collections containing 21 "Pièces récréatives" were published by Van de Velde publisher that complement the Tagrine Method.

In October 2017, was published a piece for piano: Terminal 2 (Van de Velde).

== Press excerpts ==
"Nathalie Béra-Tagrine took the measure of the work (Fantaisie de Schumann) and the mastery from one end to the other, alternating shadow and light, tension and rest with a perfectly controlled sound...". Claude Pascal – Le Figaro.

"Her playing is deeply sensitive, searching for what lies behind the notes and often reveals unexpected charms in a familiar score. A delightful touch, an airy technique, a deep power: Nathalie Béra-Tagrine kept us in suspense." Pierre Petit – Le Figaro.

"There is no mistake, Nathalie Béra-Tagrine is an ideal artist, in the most demanding acceptance of this term! - . Edgard Feder - France-Amérique – (New York city)

"Nathalie Béra-Tagrine knew not to present the tormented pages of Chopin's 4th ballad only as a skillful virtuoso but to make us suffer the deep truth and recreate them from within. A.Burkhalker – Feuille d’avis de Vevey

"The French revelation of Montreux. In 1979, her performance of Beethoven's Piano Concerto No.3 at the Palais des Festivals in Cannes left the audience with an extraordinary impression of technical quality, combined with surprising intelligence, authority and depth. Four years later, it is still with Beethoven that she conquered Montreux. In the 1st concerto this time, she supported its formal density and emotional richness from the first to the last bar. It emanates from her play a kind of ardent and controlled jubilation at the same time."

== Selected discography ==
- 1982 – 33 rpm: Chabrier – Fauré – Ravel – Satie – Milhaud (Pianissime.)
- 1990 – CD: Chopin – Liszt (Vogue)
- 1992-2000 – CD: Scriabine: 3 pièces op 2 – Intégrale des mazurkas op 3-4 études op 8. (Adda)
- 1994 – CD Ravel: Gaspard de la nuit – Sonatine – Jeux d'eau – Oiseaux tristes. (Vibrato Musique)
- 1995-2000 – CD "Piano-Passion": pièces diverses: Schubert – Chopin – Schumann – Liszt – Mendelssohn – Pierné – Scriabine. (Vibrato Musique – NBT001)
