= Nadia Tagrine =

Franco-Russian classical pianist

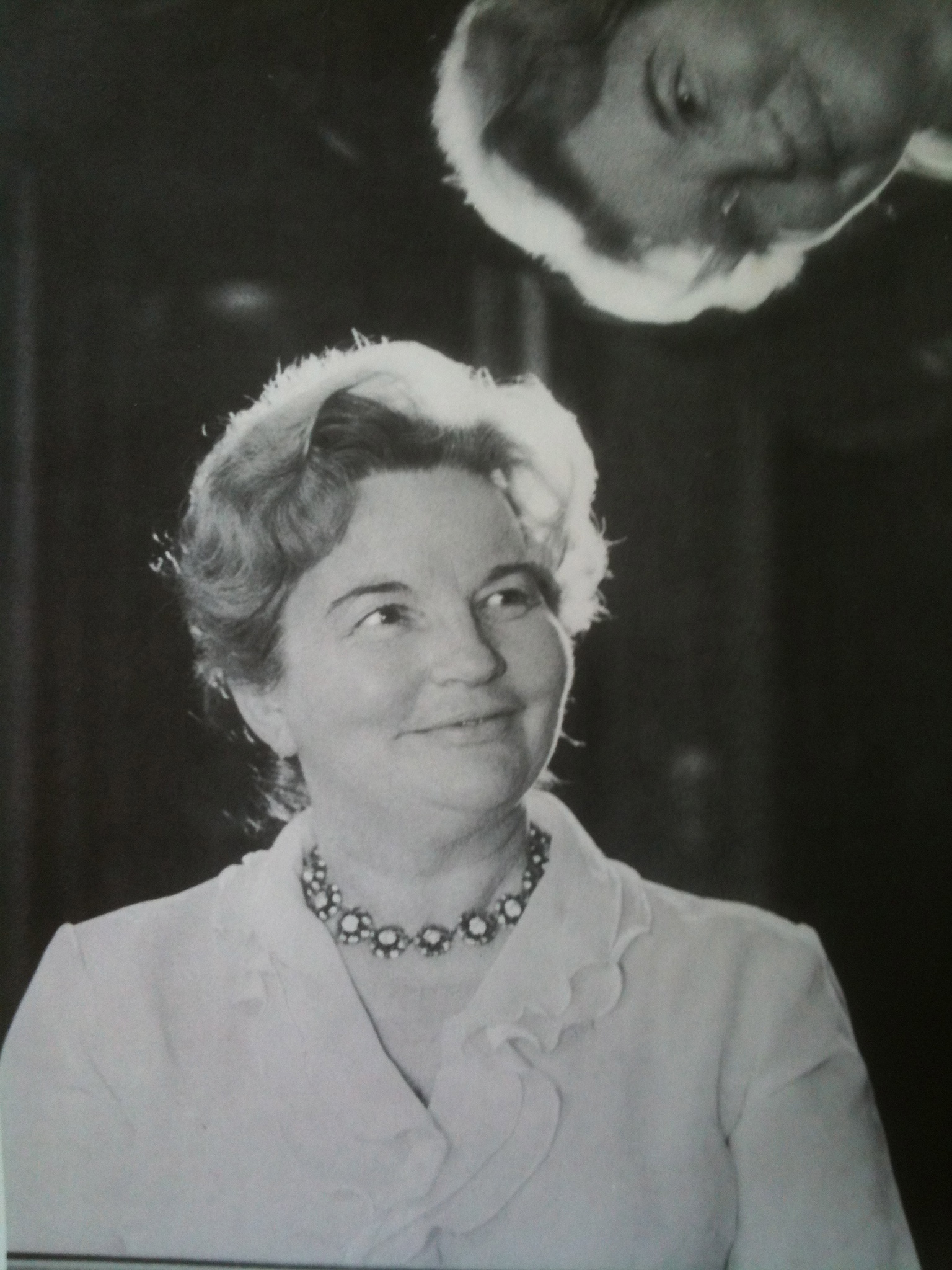
Nadia Tagrine

Nadia Tagrine (13 July 1917 – 1 June 2003) was a Franco-Russian classical pianist.

== Biography ==
Born in the 14th arrondissement of Paris, Tagrine learned the piano with two Russian refugee pianists, Lubochitz and Kamtchattoff then at the Conservatoire de Paris with Lazare-Lévy, Yves Nat and Joseph Calvet for chamber music.

Thereafter, always seeking to perfect herself, she enriched her knowledge with Vlado Perlemuter, Samson François, her classmate from the Conservatoire and finally, in 1956, with György Sebők.

Her admiration, her esteem for the latter were immense: it is the one who made her deepen the world of flexibility (discovered thanks to Lazare-Lévy) as well as the game based entirely on relaxation and the search for beautiful sound. On his advice, she stopped giving concerts for a year in order to totally modify her technique and adapt to that of the Hungarian school.

On 25 August 1944, her younger brother, Michel (Liberation Cross posthumously) died. He was a 21-year-old violinist and student of Galamian. A few months later her father, Boris, died.

Fate then made her meet Roland-Manuel who was looking for a voice for a dialogue radio program. He would be her spiritual father and from October 1944 she hosted the famous broadcast "Plaisir de la Musique". It was a live, public program that took place every Sunday at the Salle Favart. The dialogues between Tagrine and Roland-Manuel were interspersed with pieces played as soloist or with orchestra by Tagrine. Manuel Rosenthal, Lily Laskine, Francis Poulenc, Henri Dutilleux, Claude Delvincourt, Arthur Honegger, Irène Joachim and Jacques Chailley were among the many personalities invited to dialogue with them.

The 667th and last broadcast took place in October 1966.

Four books were derived from these programmes and translated into German, Spanish and Japanese.

Tagrine will produce alone other radio programs : "Toccata et variation sur un piano", every 15 days from 1958 to 1972, and "Interprètes d’hier et d’aujourd’hui", from 1972 to 1975.

During a tour of Scotland in 1947, she met her husband Marc-André Béra, a Normalien with an agrégation in English, then director of the Institut Français in Edinburgh. They remained married for nearly 40 years, until his death on 31 March 1990. They had two children together: Michel, another Normalien, agrégé in mathematics, and Nathalie, pianist.

Tagrine gave numerous concerts both in France and abroad.

She has performed as a soloist under the direction of conductors such as Ernest Ansermet, Manuel Rosenthal, Tony Aubin, Edmond Appia, Jean-François Paillard, Fernand Oubradous, and Serge Baudo.

Her repertoire was immense. She combined all periods, all styles, with the same desire to discover and make her contemporaries love music. Among them were Francis Poulenc, Henri Sauguet, Erik Satie, Darius Milhaud, Jacques Ibert, Georges Auric, Jean Françaix, Daniel-Lesur, Germaine Tailleferre, Olivier Messiaen.

She also premiered several works written for her: "Nocturne-Songe" by Roland-Manuel – 13 naive paintings by Alain Bernaud – "Danse des pantins" by Jean Rivier – Mon piano (12 easy pieces) by Jacques Chailley.

Her chamber music partners were first her brother Michel, then among others the violinists Devy Erlih and Yvonne Astruc, cellists Paul Bazelaire, Maurice Gendron, and Maurice Baquet, flutists Marcel Moyse and Jean-Pierre Rampal.

She taught in the upper grades at the Schola Cantorum de Paris from 1959 to 1980 and from 1978 to 1980 at the Conservatoire de Paris in the advanced training cycle as an assistant to Ventsislav Yankov, where she had her daughter Nathalie as a student. In 1970, she revived the Conservatoire Hortense Parent, rue de Tournon in the 6th arrondissement of Paris, and in 1980, having left the Schola, she developed the Conservatoire by opening numerous classes in instruments and solfeggio. There will be over 170 students per year.

Tagrine shared her career as a concert performer and teacher for several years, training numerous concert performers and teachers, including Laurent Grynszpan – composer and professor -, François Kerdoncuff, Annie Devize-Nalezny, Jean-Pierre Bartoli, Sylvie Lechevalier, Emmanuelle Bartoli, Gisèle Magnan, Philippe Tamborini, Maud Garbarini Irène Kudela, Stéphane Fuks, Véronique Bonnecaze, and of course her daughter Nathalie Béra-Tagrine.

She was a jury member at the Conservatoire de Paris, in national and international competitions as well as in specialized music and instrument aggrégation juries at the University of Paris IV Sorbonne.

In 1984, she was appointed vice-president of the "Guilde française des Artistes solistes".

Until the end of her life, at 85, she will play 2 pianos or 4 hands with her daughter, transmitting her knowledge for music with her students.

After she died in Château-Thierry, she was buried in the Vendières cemetery (Aisne).

In 2011, her daughter dedicated to her a piano method that transmits her teaching: La Méthode Tagrine (Van de Velde).

== Selected discography ==
- 1959: Wilhelm Friedemann Bach's Sonata in G major and 6 Polonaises. Erato Records EFM 42048 33 t
- 1963: Daniel-Lesur's Variations for piano and string orchestra. Erato mono LDE 3235 – stereo STE 50135 33 rpm
- 1984: Miscellaneous pieces for the first years of piano. "PIANINO 1". Pianissime MAG 2015 33 t

== Distinctions ==
- Chevalier of the Ordre National du Mérite.
- Officier of the Ordre des Arts et des Lettres.
