= Sabatier (surname) =

Sabatier is a French occupational name that means "shoemaker". Notable people with the surname include:

- Apollonie Sabatier, bohémienne and muse to some artists in Paris around 1850/60
- Armand Sabatier, French zoologist and photographer, discoverer of the Sabattier effect
- Bonaventure-Hypolithe Sabatier (1773–1842), French general
- Charles Wugk Sabatier (1819–1862), Canadian pianist, organist, composer, and music educator
- Ernest Sabatier (1886–1965), French historian, poet and a Catholic missionary
- François Sabatier (born 1937), French musicologist
- François Sabatier-Ungher (1818–1891), French philanthropist, art critic and translator
- Gabriel Sabattier (1892–1966), French general in World War II
- Grant Sabatier (born 1984), American author, podcaster, and entrepreneur
- Léopold Sabatier, French colonial administrator in Kon Tum and Đắk Lắk Province
- Louis Auguste Sabatier (1839–1901), French Protestant theologian
- Louis Rémy Sabattier (1863–1935), a French artist
- Patrick Sabatier (born 1951), French presenter for both radio and television
- Paul Sabatier (theologian) (1858–1928), French clergyman and historian
- Paul Sabatier (chemist) (1854–1941), Nobel-prize winning inventor of the Sabatier reaction
- Pierre Sabatier (1935–2023), French physicist
- Pierre Sabatier (artist) (1925–2003), French sculptor
- Pierre Sabatier (Maurist) (1682–1742), French Benedictine scholar
- Raphaël Bienvenu Sabatier (1732–1811), French anatomist and surgeon
- Robert Sabatier (1923–2012), French poet and novelist
