= Jean Hubeau =

- Born: 22 June 1917, France
- Died: 19 August 1992 (aged 75)
- Occupations: Pianist, Composer, Pedagogue

Jean Hubeau (22 June 1917 – 19 August 1992) was a French pianist, composer and pedagogue known especially for his recordings of Gabriel Fauré, Robert Schumann and Paul Dukas, which are recognized as benchmark versions.

== Biography ==
Admitted at the age of 9 years to the Conservatoire National Supérieur de Musique et de Danse de Paris, he studied composition with Paul Dukas, piano with Lazare Lévy, harmony with Jean Gallon, and counterpoint with Noël Gallon. He received first prizes in piano and in harmony in 1930 at 13 years. Aged 14 he won the first prize for accompanists, and in 1934, he received the second Prix de Rome with his cantata The legend of Roukmani (first prize was awarded to Eugène Bozza). The following year, he was honored by Louis Diémer.

With Henry Merckel, Hubeau made a highly praised recording of Mozart's violin sonata K454 in 1941.

In 1941, when Claude Delvincourt was appointed director of the Conservatoire, Hubeau was appointed to the vacancy left by Delvincourt at the head of the Music Academy in Versailles. In addition, he took the post of professor of chamber music of the Paris Conservatory from 1957 to 1982 where he trained many students such as Jacques Rouvier, Géry Moutier, Michel Dalberto, Jean-Yves Thibaudet, Olivier Charlier, Roland Daugareil, Cécilia Tsan, and Sonia Wieder-Atherton.

Landormy described Hubeau's compositional style as using a simple language, with no revolutionary intent, but displaying a freshness of invention evident in thematic material, rhythm and use of timbres.

== Compositions ==
- The Legend of Roukmani, cantata (1934)
- Concerto Héroique for piano and orchestra
- Concerto for violin and orchestra in C major (1939)
- Concerto for cello and orchestra in A minor (also reduction for cello and piano)
- Tableaux hindous, for orchestra (1935)
- La Fiancée du Diable, ballet
- Trois Fables de La Fontaine, ballet
- Un coeur de diamant ou l'Infante, ballet
- Sonata for chromatic trumpet and piano (1943)
- Violin sonata
- Rondes pastorales and ballads
- Humoresque Sonatina for horn, flute, clarinet and piano
- Huit Rondeaux et Ballades de François Villon
- Piano variations

== Discography ==
- Trumpet and piano with Maurice André
- Gabriel Fauré - Complete works for solo piano
- Gabriel Fauré - Elegie Op.24, Cello Sonatas No.1 Op.109 & No.2 Op.117 (Paul Tortelier, cello)
- Claude Debussy - Cello Sonata (Paul Tortelier, cello)
- Camille Saint-Saëns - Works for violin and piano (Olivier Charlier, violin)
- Georges Onslow - Grand Sextet, Op. 77b and Grand Septet, Op. 79
- Paul Dukas - Works for piano
- Jean Hubeau - Quatre Rondels de François Villon Mario Hacquard et Claude Collet
