= Sonia Wieder-Atherton =

Franco-American classical cellist

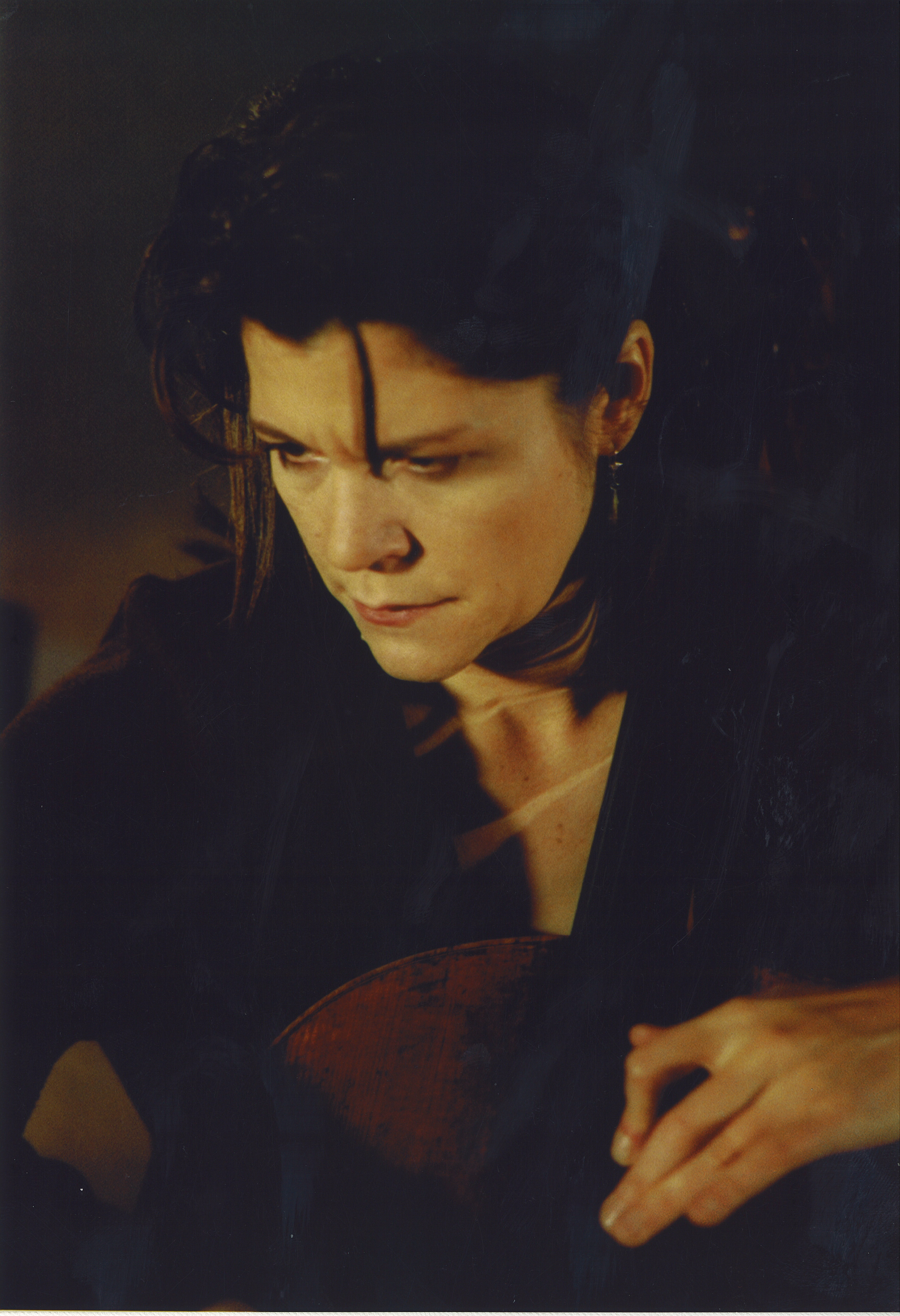
Sonia Wieder Atherton (2005)

Sonia Wieder-Atherton (born 1961) is a Franco-American classical cellist.

== Life ==
Born in San Francisco of a Romanian mother and an American father of Jewish origin, she grew up in New York and then in Paris where she entered the Conservatoire de Paris in Maurice Gendron's class. She is the sister of Claire Atherton.

After her studies at the Conservatoire de Paris in the cello classes of Maurice Gendron and chamber music of Jean Hubeau, she studied with Mstislav Rostropovich, then two years at the Moscow Conservatory with Natalia Shakhovskaya.

In 1986, she won a mention at the concours de violoncelle Rostropovitch.

From then on, she played as a soloist with the Orchestre de Paris, the Orchestre national de France, the National Orchestra of Belgium, the Orchestre Philharmonique de Liège, the Israel Philharmonic Orchestra, the Gulbenkian Orchestra of Lisbonne, the Orchestre de Chambre de Lausanne, the Luxembourg Philharmonic Orchestra.

She is regularly invited by major international festivals.

Composers dedicate works to her: Henri Dutilleux, Georges Aperghis (Le reste du temps, Profils for the duo she forms with Françoise Rivalland), Pascal Dusapin (including a cello concerto, Cello), Betsy Jolas, Ivan Fedele.

In chamber music, she plays with pianists Imogen Cooper, Jean-Claude Pennetier, Laurent Cabasso, cellists Raphaël Oleg and Silvia Marcovici, the violist Gérard Caussé, percussionist Françoise Rivalland. In 1999, the Académie des beaux-arts (France) awards her the Grand Prix Del Duca.

She is also a composer and occasionally arranger, notably composing the soundtrack for the film A Couch in New York (directed by Chantal Akerman). She composed the original music for the film L'Amour conjugal by Benoît Barbier).

In May 2011, she received the prize of the Fondation Renée-et-Léonce-Bernheim pour les arts, les sciences et les lettres which each year nominates three winners whose work has creative value in each of the fields of the arts.

On October 4, 2014, she participated in that year edition of Nuit blanche in Paris.

In 2015, she was made an Ordre des Arts et des Lettres.

On 1 July 2018, she performed pieces composed by Gabriel Fauré, David Zahavi, Max Bruch, Ludwig van Beethoven, Serguei Rachmaninov, Jean-Sébastien Bach at the entrance ceremony to the Panthéon of Simone Veil and her husband Antoine.

== Premieres ==
In recent years, Wieder-Atherton has been at the origin of many projects that she designs and stages:

- Chants juifs, a cycle for cello and piano where she is inspired by the art of the hazan.
- Chants d’Est, for cello and instrumental ensemble, conceived as a journey from Russia Mitteleuropa.
- Vita, for solo cello and three cellos, where she tells the story of Angioletta-Angel's life through two geniuses out of their time, Monteverdi and Scelsi.
- Odyssée for cello and imaginary choir, a woman alone with her cello accompanied by a soundtrack, confronts the elements. Wind, waves, chaos, storms...
- Little Girl Blue, by Nina Simone, with piano and percussions.

In addition, there are projects such as:

- D'Est en musique, a show created with the images from the film D’Est by Chantal Akerman.
- Danses nocturnes, with Charlotte Rampling, where the works of Benjamin Britten and Sylvia Plath meet.
- Navire Night, by Marguerite Duras, with Fanny Ardant.

== Discography ==
- Little Girl Blue, from Nina Simone, Naïve Records, 2014, with Bruno Fontaine and Laurent Kraif
- Vita Monteverdi Scelsi, Naïve, 2011
- Jewish songs, Naïve, 2010
- Chants d'Est sur le sentier recouvert, Naïve, 2009
- Brahms - Bach, Sony-BMG, 2007
- En Concerto, Sony-BG, 2006
- Rachmaninov : après un rêve, with Imogen Cooper, Sony-BMG, 2002
- Au commencement Monteverdi, Sony-BMG, 2001
- Schubert Trios / Arpeggione Sonata, Sony-BMG, 1998
- L'Ecclesiaste, with Sami Frey, RCA, 1996
- Un Divan à New York (B.O.F), RCA, 1996

== Participation ==
- Château de sable, on Jacques Higelin's album Beau Repaire, 2013
