= Conservatoire National =

Conservatoire National may refer to one of the following:

- Conservatoire national supérieur d'art dramatique (CNSAD), a college for acting, theatre and drama in Paris, France
- Conservatoire national supérieur de musique et de danse de Paris (CNSMDP), a college for music and dance in Paris, France
- Conservatoire national supérieur de musique et de danse de Lyon, a college for music and dance in Lyon, France
