= Sabatier (disambiguation) =

Sabatier is a brand of kitchen knife produced in France.

Sabatier or Sabattier may also refer to:

- Sabatier (surname)
- Sabatier (crater), a lunar crater.
- Mount Sabatier, a peak on the Antarctic island of South Georgia.
- Paul Sabatier University, in Toulouse, France

== See also ==
- Sabatier reaction, a method of producing methane in the presence of a catalyst.
- Sabattier effect, a photographic darkroom process (also known as pseudo-solarisation) that results in a partial image reversal.
