= Jörg Demus =

Austrian pianist (1928–2019)

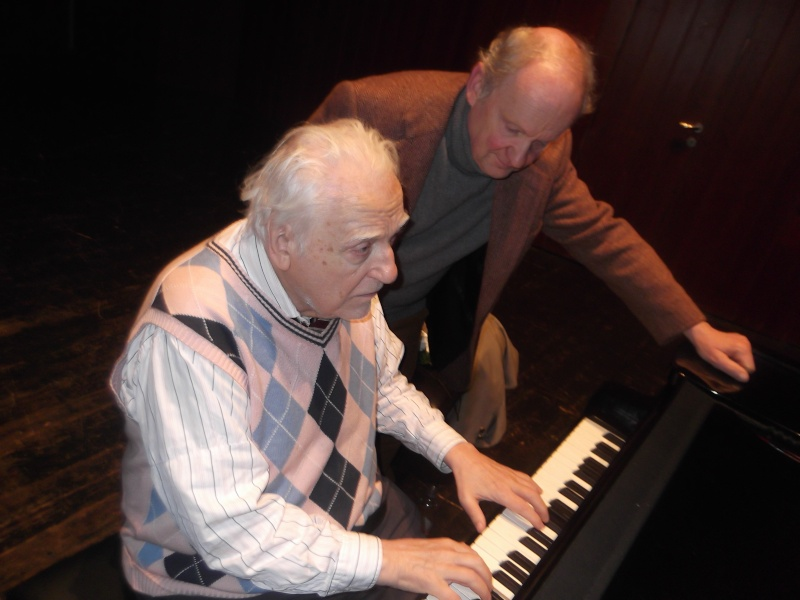
- Jörg Demus and his manager Manfred Jahn in 2016
- Born: Jörg Wolfgang Demus; 2 December 1928; St. Pölten, Lower Austria, Austria
- Died: 16 April 2019 (aged 90); Vienna, Austria
- Education: Vienna Academy of Music
- Occupations: Pianist; Composer; Academic teacher
- Awards: Ferruccio Busoni International Piano Competition; Mozart Medal; Austrian Cross of Honour for Science and Art; Legion of Honour

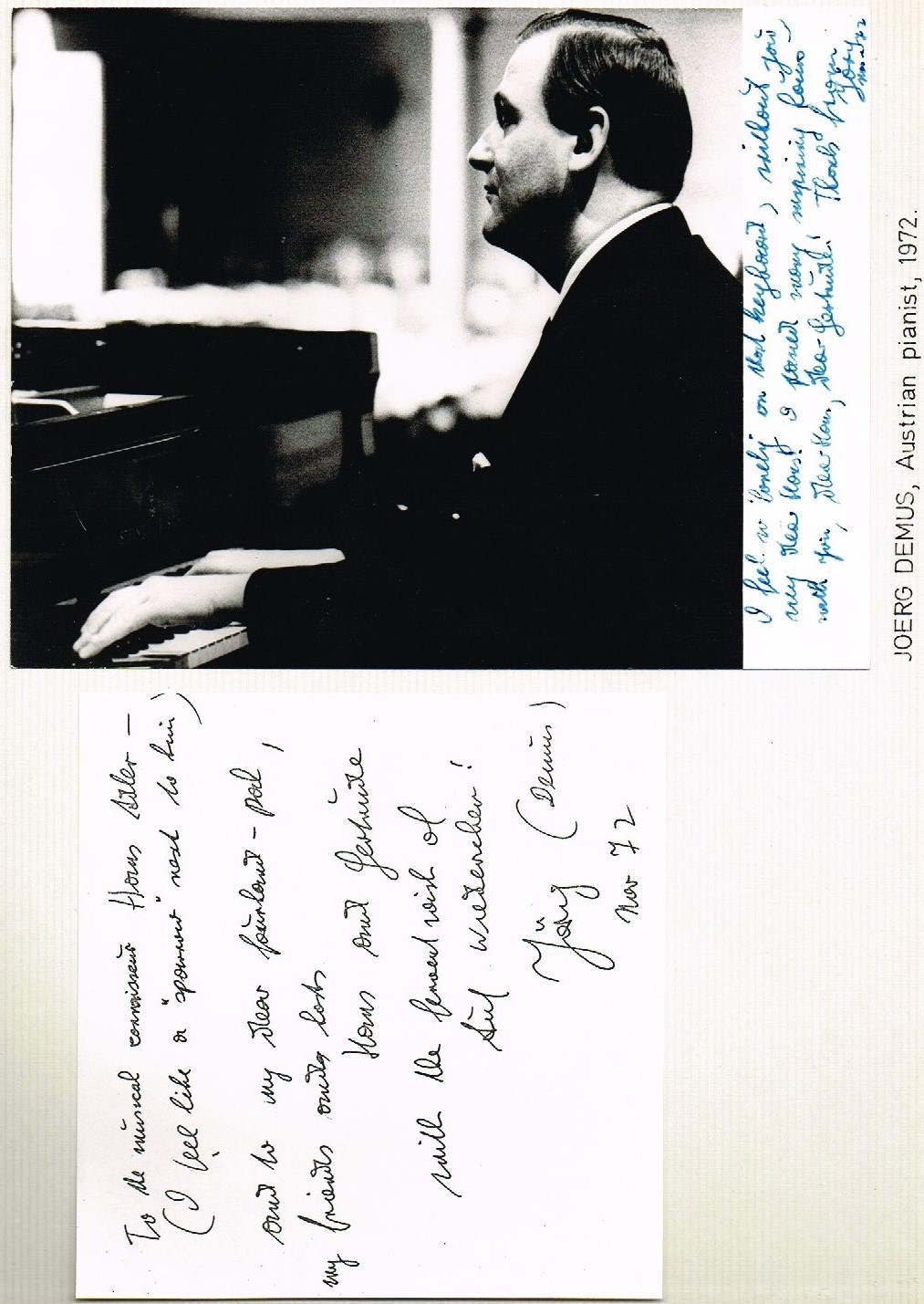
Demus in 1972, dedicated photo from a South Africa tour

Jörg Wolfgang Demus (2 December 1928 – 16 April 2019) was an Austrian classical pianist who appeared internationally and made many recordings. He was also a composer and a lecturer at music academies. In composition and playing, he focused on chamber music and lieder. He played with singers such as Elisabeth Schwarzkopf and Dietrich Fischer-Dieskau, as a piano duo with Paul Badura-Skoda, and with string players such as Josef Suk and Antonio Janigro. Demus was instrumental in bringing the historic fortepiano to concert podiums. He was a member of the Legion of Honour, among many awards. He is regarded as one of the leading Austrian pianists of the immediate post-World War II era.

== Early life and education ==
Demus was born in St. Pölten; his father was the art historian Otto Demus, and his mother was a concert violinist. At the age of six, Demus received his first piano lessons. Five years later, at the age of 11, he entered the Vienna Academy of Music, studying piano, composition and conducting. He made his debut as a pianist when he was still a student: at the age of 15, he played in the Brahms-Saal of the prestigious Gesellschaft der Musikfreunde Bach's Das wohltemperierte Klavier. He graduated in 1945, then 17 years old, after which he continued to study conducting with Josef Krips and Hans Swarowsky. Demus studied in Paris with Yves Nat from 1951 to 1953. In 1953 he further studied interpretation with Wilhelm Kempff, Arturo Benedetti Michelangeli, and Edwin Fischer, and attended master classes with Walter Gieseking.

== Pianist ==
In 1951, Demus made his first tour to South America and then appeared internationally in concert halls. He appeared in England and France. In 1972 he toured Southern Africa in all the major cities. In 1974, Demus performed for the Peabody Mason Concert series in Boston.

Demus was active as a lied accompanist and a chamber music partner, appearing with singers such as Elisabeth Schwarzkopf, Dietrich Fischer-Dieskau, Elly Ameling and Peter Schreier, and with string players such as Josef Suk and Antonio Janigro. He performed widely as a soloist on both modern and historical instruments, returning the fortepiano to concert podiums. Demus collaborated with Paul Badura-Skoda on the concert platform and on a book concerning the interpretation of Beethoven's piano sonatas.

His playing of Bach's works showed their structure as well as melodic lines. He favoured Schumann's music, revealing a high degree of playful levity besides romantic expressiveness. His playing of Debussy's music stands out in Klangsinn, a sense for a colourful impressionist sound world. He collected historic keyboard instruments and presented them to a museum. He lectured at the music academies of Vienna and Stuttgart.

Demus continued playing until shortly before his death, performing with Badura-Skoda at the 2018 Linz Brucknerfest. He died in Vienna on 16 April 2019, aged 90, after a short illness.

== Composer ==
Demus was also a composer, chiefly of music for the piano, chamber music and lied, composing in a generally conservative style. Music for cello and piano takes its inspiration from the poems of Paul Verlaine and the late music by Schumann. He also completed a fragmentary Piano Piece in C minor D. 916c by Schubert.

== Awards and prizes ==
In 1956 Demus won first prize at the Ferruccio Busoni International Piano Competition. Demus received the Mozart Medal of the Mozartgemeinde Wien in 1979. He was awarded the Österreichisches Ehrenkreuz in 2006, the Beethoven Ring of the Beethoven Society Vienna in 1977, the Robert Schumann Prize of the City of Zwickau and the Order of the Legion of Honour.

== Recordings ==
Among the many recordings by Demus are sets of the complete piano works by both Robert Schumann and Claude Debussy. He also recorded Schubert's Impromptus on the Deutsche Grammophon label. He made recordings on historical keyboard instruments, including, for example, the earliest such recording of Beethoven's "Waldstein" sonata in 1970, on a Broadwood dating from 1802.

He recorded several of his own compositions with cellist Maria Kliegel, including Poetische Sonate (Poetic Sonata) in G minor, Op. 8, Liebe (Love), Op. 21, after Verlaine's Crimen Amoris, the Cello Sonata in C minor, "Il Tramonto", Op. 35, and Nacht der Sterne (Starry Night), Op. 14.
