= Reine Gianoli =

French pianist (1915–1979)

- Born: 13 March 1915; Paris
- Died: 21 February 1979 (aged 63); Paris
- Occupation: French classical pianist

Reine Gianoli (13 March 1915 – 21 February 1979) was a French classical pianist.

== Biography ==
Born in Paris, Gianoli studied with Lazare Lévy, Alfred Cortot, Yves Nat and Edwin Fischer.

Throughout her career, she performed with the greatest orchestras and conductors, including Paul Paray, Felix Weingartner, Hermann Scherchen, Louis Auriacombe, Milan Horvat and Georges Sebastian. She played numerous times in the Strasbourg and Lucerne Festival musical seasons, sharing the stage with Pablo Casals, Pierre Fournier, Georges Enesco and Edwin Fischer.

In 1947, she was appointed piano teacher at the École Normale de Musique de Paris, then in 1977 at the Conservatoire de Paris. At both conservatories, she trained many musicians, such as André Boucourechliev, Maud Garbarini, Pierrette Mouledous, Géry Moutier, Catherine Joly and Jean-Yves Thibaudet.

Gianoli died in Paris on 21 February 1979 at age 63.

== Recordings ==
Gianoli made numerous recordings for the Westminster, BAM and Ades firms. Between 1947 and 1955, she recorded Mozart's 17 piano sonatas live.

Worth mentioning is also her recording of the complete trios of Haydn and especially her complete piano works of Schumann, which reflects both the richness of her culture and the freshness of her inspiration.

== Legacy ==
- A short film was dedicated to her by Marcel Bluwal and Claude Ventura. Duration: 13 min, year of production: 1967.
