= Ivan Donchev =

Bulgarian pianist

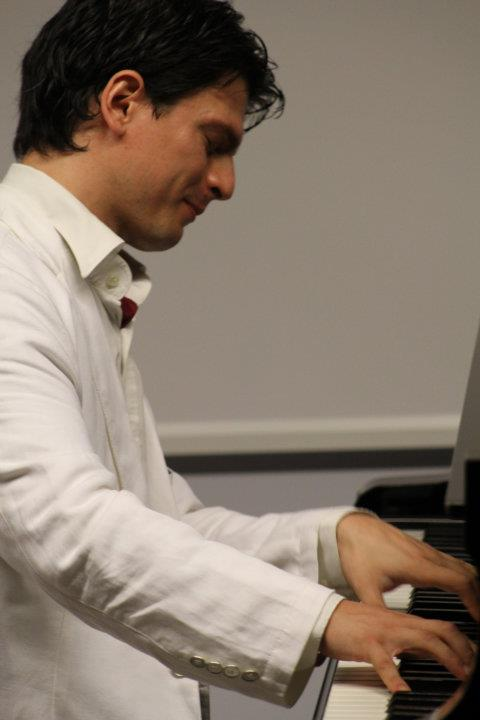
Ivan Donchev

Ivan Donchev (born August 11, 1981, Burgas) is a Bulgarian pianist.

== Biography ==
He began his musical studies at the age of five at “Pancho Vladigerov” National Music School in the class of Julia Nenova. From 2007 to 2013 he studied with Aldo Ciccolini. He made his debut as a soloist at nine with works by Bach, Beethoven, Czerny, Haydn and Berkovich. In 1994 – at the age of twelve – he made his concerto debut with Burgas Philharmonic Orchestra performing Haydn's Piano Concerto in D. The same year he won the 1st prize at "Svetoslav Obretenov" Piano Competition in Bulgaria. At 16 he won the 1st prize at the 2nd Piano Competition for German and Austrian Music in Burgas. Some months later - after taking part at the IInd "Carl Filtsch" International Piano Competition in Sibiu - he was awarded the special prize by the Chopin Society in Darmstadt. The same year he made his debut at the “Gasteig” concert hall in Munich and in other cities in Germany. In 2008 he won the XVIIIth Music Competition “Società Umanitaria” in Milan, ex-aequo with Federico Colli (among the other prize winners was Beatrice Rana).

In 2009 he made his debut at the Sala Verdi in Milan's Conservatory. He has performed at the Seiler Piano Festival in Kitzingen, Germany (2002), at the Festival de Radio France in Montpellier (2009), two concerts with Beethoven programs (including Sonata, op. 106 "Hammerklavier" and variations on a Theme of Diabelli, op. 120) at the 58th Festival dei Due Mondi in Spoleto (2015) and the US debut at Merkin Hall in New York City with the Concerto No. 5 "Emperor" op. 73 by Ludwig van Beethoven (2015). In 2010 he held recitals and master classes in Japan. In 2012 he made his debut in South Korea with the Concerto in A minor, op. 16 by Grieg. Between 2012 and 2014 he carried out three tours in South Korea where he played in the major cities of the country, both in recitals and with orchestra.

Ivan Donchev has performed with conductors such as Daniel Schweizer, Ivan Kozhuharov, David Crescenzi, Yordan Dafov, Stefano Trasimeni, Piero Romano, Grigor Palikarov, Giuseppe Lanzetta, Geum No-sang, Il Koo Lee. In 2008 he has received the “Sorrento Classica” prize from his mentor Aldo Ciccolini and in 2011 they have performed piano duo concert at Fenetrange Music Festival in France.

Donchev has recorded the world premiere of Vito Palumbo’s Quadro Sinfonico Concertante (dedicated to him by the author) and the 3rd Tchaykovsky’s piano concerto (RAI Trade - 2007). In 2011 he has released the complete recording of Liszt’s “Harmonies Poétiques et Religieuses” for Sheva Collection. The recording of Beethoven piano and violin sonatas with violinist Ivo Stankov for Gega new was 5 stars awarded by the British magazine “Musical Opinion”. In 2016 Ivan Donchev performed the 3rd piano concerto by Sergey Rachmaninov in Ekaterinburg. The concert was streamed by the Uralfest TV.

In June 2022, Donchev served on the jury of the second edition of the International Arthur Nikisch Conducting Competition, held in Pleven, Bulgaria, together with conductors including Nayden Todorov, Martin Roa and Tzanislav Petkov, Pleven Philharmonic concertmaster Chavdar Valkov, and jury president Philippe Entremont.

== Recordings ==
- CD Gega New (2017) Ivan Donchev. Live in Montpellier.
- CD Gega New (2014) Beethoven: Sonatas for Violin and Piano Nos. 4, 5, 8.
- CD Sheva Collection (2011) Liszt: Deux Légendes - Harmonies poétiques et religieuses.
- CD Rai Trade (2007) Tchaikovsky: Piano concerto n.3 op 75; Palumbo: Quadro sinfonico concertante for piano and orchestra. Oradea Symphonic Orchestra - Stefano Trasimeni, conductor.
