= Karen Gorden =

Musician

- Born: Springfield, Ohio, USA
- Occupations: Conductor and music director for symphony, opera, and contemporary classical music; advocate for accessibility and sustainability of the arts

Karen Gorden is a conductor and music director for symphony, opera, and contemporary classical music.

== Musical life and career ==
Gorden’s conducting career is associated with musical centers in Europe, the United States, and Asia such as the Staatsoper Berlin, The John F. Kennedy Center for the Performing Arts, and the National Centre for the Performing Arts in Mumbai, India.

Known as a musician's conductor, Gorden has worked with an international audience. She is also an advocate for global accessibility and sustainability for the arts.

Gorden has been awarded multiple international prizes, including the Special Jury Prize from the 50th Concours International d'Exécution Musicale de Genève for Conductors in Switzerland, the Prix Nadia Boulanger in France, and the Opera Award at the State Theatre Opava in the Czech Republic. She is a graduate with top honors from the Conservatoire National Supérieur de Musique de Lyon and the Yale University School of Music.
