= Helena Sá e Costa =

Portuguese pianist (1913–2006)

- Born: May 26, 1913; Porto, Portugal
- Died: January 9, 2006 (aged 92)
- Education: Lisbon National Piano Conservatory
- Occupation: Pianist

Helena Moreira de Sá e Costa GOSE (26 May 1913 – 9 January 2006) was a pianist, concert performer and teacher.

== Early life and education ==
She was the granddaughter of Bernardo Valentim Moreira de Sá (founder of the Porto Music Conservatory) and daughter of the pianist Leonilda Moreira de Sá e Costa and the pianist and composer Luís Costa. Her sister Madalena was a cellist.

She completed her course at Lisbon National Piano Conservatory with a maximum mark of 20 out of 20, having been taught by her parents and Vianna da Motta. She also studied with Artur Schnabel and Edwin Fischer.

== Career ==
She performed with Fischer in 40 concerts in Europe's major cities, playing J. S. Bach's keyboard concertos nos. 2, 3 and 4.

She performed in Europe, North America and, Brazil, Angola and Mozambique. She worked with all the Portuguese orchestra conductors, including Ernest Ansermet, Igor Markevitch, Paul Klecki and Swarowky. Among the artists she worked with in concert performances were Pierre Fournier, Pablo Casals, Maurice Gendron, Sándor Végh, Arthur Grumiaux, János Starker, L. Hoelscher, Ruggiero Ricci, Stich-Randall, Rita Gorr, and Zara Nelsova. She formed a duo with her sister, the cellist Madalena Costa. Also with her sister and the violinist Henri Mouton, she formed the Trio Portugália.

She taught in the Lisbon and Porto conservatories, and also oversaw courses in Cascais, Espinho, Estoril, Salzburg (Austria), Gunsbach (Albert Schweitzer Centre, in Alsace, France), Switzerland, Italy, England, Germany, Canada and America. At the Music School of the Porto Polytechnic Institute she was Chair of the Installation Commission and Chair of the Scientific Council.

She performed at festivals, including those at Strasbourg, Wiesbaden, Haarlem, Prades, Gulbenkian, Majorca, Costa del Sol, Sintra, Espinho and Costa Verde. She served on the judging panels at international contests such as those at Berlin, Berna, Vianna da Motta, Palma de Mallorca, Canada, Maria Callas (Athens), Luís Costa (Porto) and the Portuguese Covilhã, Musical Youth and João Arroyo contests.

Her recordings include the first book of J. S. Bach's The Well-Tempered Clavier; and also Beethoven's Concerto no. 4 and the "J. S. Bach Live Recording" (Porto 2001).

== Awards ==
She was awarded the Moreira de Sá prize (1939); the Beethoven prize instituted by Vianna da Motta (1937); The Commendation of the Order of Santiago de Espada (1982); the Grand Officer of the Military Order of Santiago da Espada, in 2001; the medal of Merit of the City of Porto (1983); attributed by the Secretary of State for Culture (1989); and the Almada Prize (2000).
