= Véronique Bonnecaze =

French classical pianist

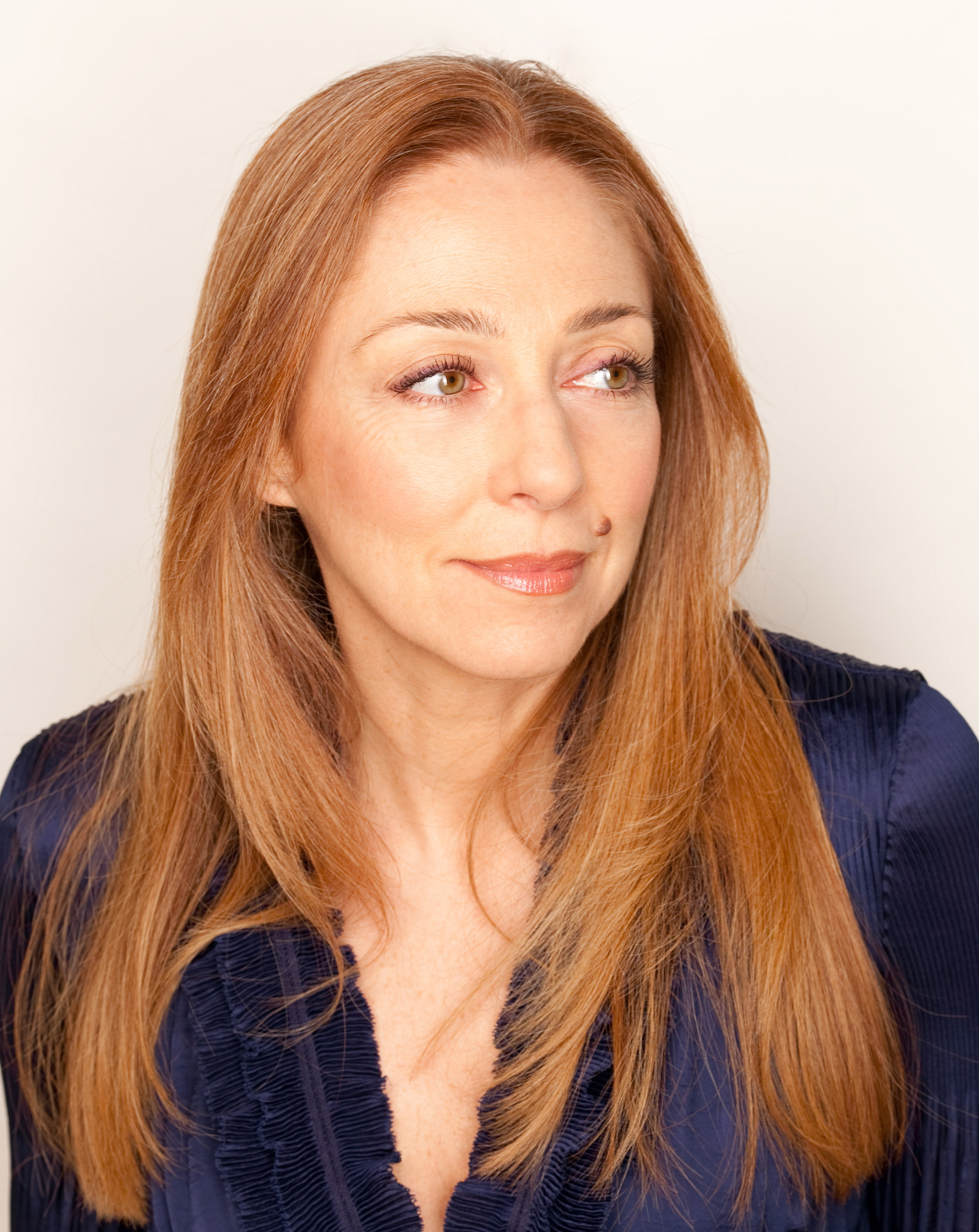
Véronique Bonnecaze

Véronique Bonnecaze is a 21st-century French classical pianist.

She studied at the Bordeaux Conservatoire, then at the Paris Conservatoire (CNSM) with Ventsislav Yankov. She also worked with Germaine Mounier, Vladimir Nielsen and with Oxana Yablonskaya at the Juilliard School in New York . She has won prizes and made the finals of many international piano competitions such as Geneva, Mavi Marcoz, Chopin Palma de Majorque, Pescara and Jaen.

She has played in recital and with orchestra in France (Gaveau and Cortot concert halls, Athénée Theater...), in Austria (Salzbourg Mozarteum), in Germany, in Switzerland (Geneva's Victoria Hall), in the United States (New York's Weill Hall), and also in Belgium, Spain, Italy, Hungary, Sweden, Greece, Japan, Lebanon...

Her recording of Chopin's Etudes was praised by Harold Schonberg, then music critic at the New York Times. This "talented pianist" has also recorded a Chopin CD (including the Third Sonata) and her double album Schumann-Liszt obtained the "Maestro" award of the "Pianiste" Magazine.

She is a tenured piano professor at the École Normale Cortot in Paris where she is also artistic director of the noon concerts and gives masterclasses among others in Japan and at the Cagliari Music Academy.

She has founded the Arcachon International Piano Competition, the « Harmonies du Soir » series at the Plaza Athénée hotel in Paris, the concerts series "Musical Emotions" at the "Cercle France-Amériques" in Paris, as well as a yearly selection event in Tokyo in order to award scholarships to study at the École Normale Cortot. She is also Vice President of the Francis Poulenc International Piano Competition and President of the Biscarrosse Musica Club.
