= Jacques Di Donato =

French musician and improviser

Jacques Di Donato (born 27 August 1942) is a French musician and improviser. A clarinetist, saxophonist and drummer, he works in various fields ranging from jazz to contemporary music, classical music and improvised music. He was a clarinet teacher at the Conservatoire national supérieur de musique et de danse de Lyon between 1984 and 2007.

== Biography ==
Born in Bourg-en-Bresse, Di Donato discovered music at the age of twelve, when he began playing in his father's ball orchestra. He later discovered the saxophone, then the clarinet, which became his instrument of choice.

He studied at the Conservatoire de Paris where he obtained his first prizes in clarinet and chamber music.

He has made numerous collaborations with artists such as Louis Sclavis, Pierre Boulez, Bernard Lubat, among many others.

He appeared as soloist in various orchestras, notably with the Orchestre philharmonique de Radio France from 1978 to 1990.

Leader of several ensembles (including "Trio de clarinettes", Jacques Di Donato Quintet, the "Mhère Quartet", the "Système Friche", and "Brahmâ"), he created and directed the festival "Fruits de Mhère, Les Champs de l'Improvisation", dedicated to avant-garde music and experimental arts in general. He was a member of the Saxophone quartet, with Jean-Louis Chautemps.

In 1998, he designed the B♭ clarinet model and the Signature for the Henri Selmer Paris instrument maker.

== Awards ==
Di Donato was made a Chevalier of the Ordre des Arts et des Lettres in 1985.

== Albums ==
- 1982: Mad Sax II, "Quatuor de saxophones", CY Records – 733613 WE 341
- 1991: Trio de clarinettes Live, Jacques Di Donato, Louis Sclavis, Armand Angster, FMP
- 1993: Clic!!!, Jacques Di Donato Quintet, Pan Music
- 1993: Green dolphy suite, Double trio, Enja Records
- 1995: Déblocage d'émergence, Michel Edelin quartet, AA Records
- 1996: Le Système Friche, Xavier Charles, Jacques Di Donato, In Situ
- 1996: Du Slavon Glagol, Khokhot
- 1999: La Compagnie des Musiques à Ouïr, la Lichère- Frémeaux associés
- 2007: Les p’tites chansons de Marc Perrone, Marc Peronne, Rue Bleue Productions
- 2010: Images et Personnages, Gael Mevel quintet, Leo Records
- 2011: Brahmâ, Brahmâ Trio
- 2012: Resurgence, Michel Edelin quartet, RogueArt
