= Hélène Bouchez =

French conductor (born 1973)

Hélène Bouchez (born 1973) is a French conductor.

== Life ==
Bouchez was born in Paris and grew up in Norway. After literary studies in hypokhâgne and khâgne (Lycée Fénelon, Paris) and a master's degree in musicology (Paris Sorbonne and Lyon Louis Lumière), she continued her musical training in piano and conducting.

She received a first prize for piano unanimously first nominated at the Conservatoire national supérieur musique et danse de Lyon (class of Roger Muraro and Éric Heidsieck) and a first prize in conducting unanimously first nominated at the Conservatoire de Paris, as well as the special Marcel Dautremer prize.

Winner of the Tokyo International Conducting Competition, she was awarded an endowment from the Min-On Association concert.

Selected by competition for international academies, her experience is enriched abroad, particularly in the United States: she is received in residence at Tanglewood where the Boston Symphony and the Tanglewood Music Center Orchestra stay. There she performed many critically acclaimed concerts, including a co-direction with Kurt Masur on radio. At the same time, she receives advice from Leonard Slatkin, Rafael Frühbeck de Burgos, Marin Alsop, Seiji Ozawa, and Christoph von Dohnányi.

In Switzerland, she directs Pierre Boulez' Notations alongside the composer at the Lucerne Festival.

Involved in the symphonic repertoire, she is the guest of various French orchestras: Orchestre national de Lyon, Orchestre philharmonique de Radio France, Rouen Philharmonic Orchestra, Orchestre régional Avignon-Provence, Orchestre national d'Île-de-France, Orchestre de Chambre Nouvelle-Aquitaine (Folles journées of Nantes), Orchestre de Picardie, Orchestre symphonique de Vichy.

She shares the stage with soloists, especially pianists Alexander Gavrylyuk and Conrad Tao, violinist Pierre Amoyal, harpist Marielle Nordmann.

In the United States, Hélène Bouchez is the guest of the Detroit Symphony, he National Symphony Orchestra, the New Mexico Philharmonic, the Fort Wayne Philharmonic Orchestra, and the Cabrillo Festival of Contemporary Music (California).

In Asia, she conducts the New Japan Philharmonic and the Pohang Symphony Orchestra in Korea. In Europe, she conducts the Sarajevo Philharmonic Orchestra, the Sofia Philharmonic Orchestra, and the Bartok Festival Orchestra in Hungary.

She is also associated with scenic events by conducting Stravinsky's L'Histoire du soldat (staged by Roland Auzet with the singer and actor Thomas Fersen), the premiere of Germaine Tillion's Le Verfügbar aux Enfers (Théâtre du Châtelet), Cine-concert (premiere and tours of À propos de Nice about Jean Vigo's short film, Brand upon the Brain! of Canadian filmmaker Guy Maddin).

She collaborates with contemporary composers such as Philippe Leroux, François Paris, Thierry Blondeau and gets involved in the music of her time at the Festival d'automne à Paris, the Manca Festival in Nice, festival Aujourd'hui musiques à Perpignan) with the Sillages, Syntax, Apostrophe, L'Instant donné ensembles, and the ensemble XX-XXI of the Conservatoire national supérieur de musique et de danse de Lyon, the Orchestre des Lauréats du Conservatoire de Paris. The Coup de cœur of the Académie Charles Cros was awarded to her recording of Homo Loquax by Pascal Ducourtioux with the Orchestre philharmonique de Radio France.

In conjunction with her stage activity, Bouchez has been teaching at the Conservatoire national supérieur de musique et de danse de Lyon since 2001 where she assists Marie-Josèphe Jude.
