= Pierre Sabatier (artist) =

French sculptor

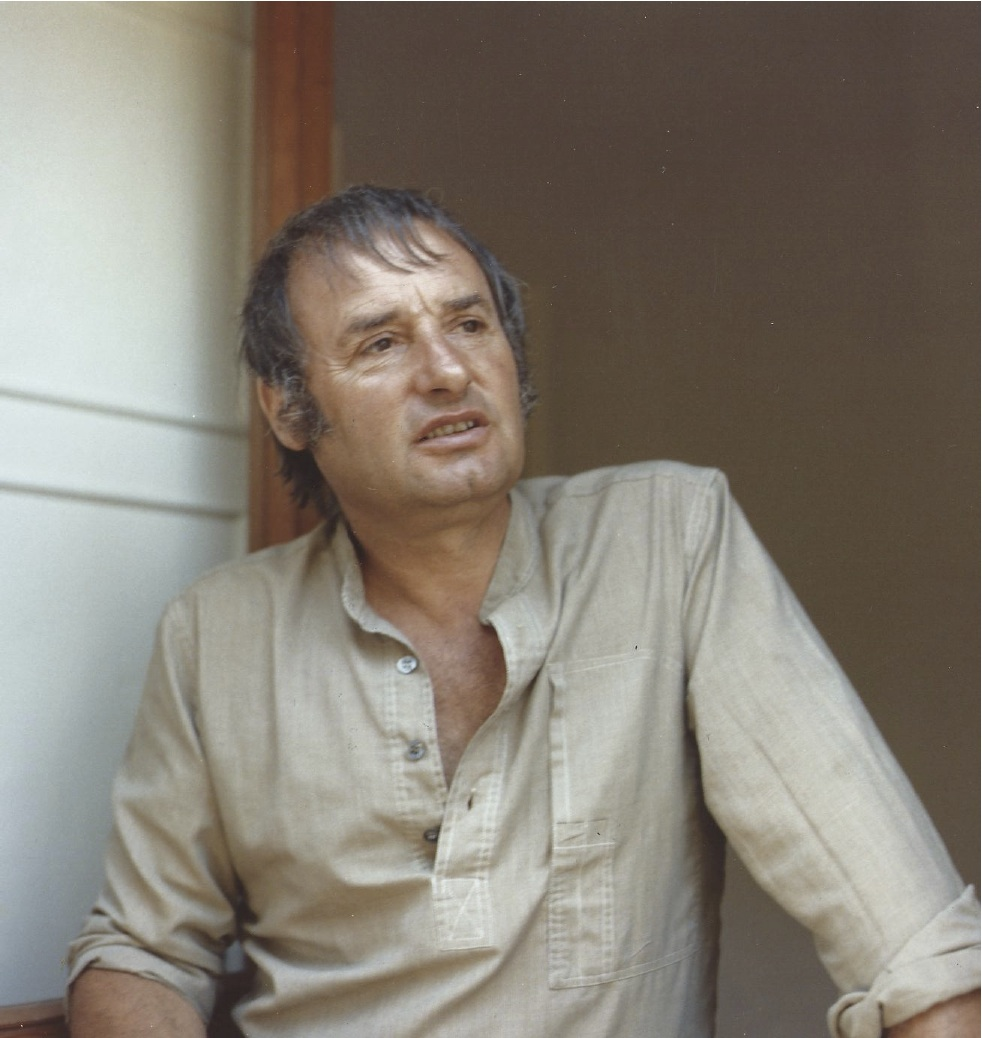
- Born: 1925; Moulins, France
- Died: 2003 (aged 77–78); Paris, France
- Education: École nationale supérieure des Arts Décoratifs, École nationale supérieure des Beaux-Arts
- Known for: Sculpture
- Movement: Modern Architecture

Pierre Sabatier (20 March 1925 – 3 May 2003) was a French sculptor who throughout his career produced over 150 major and diverse works in France and internationally.

== Biography ==
Born in 1925, Pierre Sabatier grew up in the French town of Moulins where he attended primary and secondary school. After WWII, he moved to Paris where, from 1949 to 1952, he attended classes at the École nationale supérieure des Arts Décoratifs and the École nationale supérieure des Beaux-Arts. For nearly fifty years, Sabatier accompanied the modern architecture movement with his dedication to building collective and monumental art. Many of his works were made possible by the "1% for art" law passed in France by André Malraux at the beginning of the 1950s and which stipulated the percentage of the budget of a public construction project that had to be consecrated to a work of art.

In 1965 the first issue of the review Le Mur Vivant (or The Living Wall) was published, prefaced by Raymond Lopez, Maurice Novarina and Le Corbusier. It was a hallmark date for artists committed to the integration of art into architecture and Sabatier became a committed member of the movement. Top architects of the period commissioned him for the conception and realization of interior elements, where Sabatier's works often had an important, functional role: partitions, doors, screen walls. Sabatier conceived his projects in collaboration with architects, rarely producing stand-alone pieces but instead works that worked within the global conception. His works figure in private buildings (company headquarters, banks, insurance companies) as well as in public spaces (high schools, universities, city halls, courthouses), both in France and internationally (in particular Belgium, Germany, Canada, Saudi Arabia and Iraq).

Pierre Sabatier continually explored new forms. In 1981, he designed the Kaleicycloscope, a metamorphic projection space in perpetual movement, made of pearl-finished aluminium and composed of rotating cylindrical elements. In 1995–2001 he developed the Siderolite, a sculpture in stainless steel tubes, placed in a designed natural environment. Beyond his monumental works in architectural and public spaces, Pierre Sabatier also created a significant number of works in the domain of religious art with the design of numerous liturgical objects and furniture.

In October 2014, the art auction house Piasa organised in Paris an auction and debate dedicated to the work of Pierre Sabatier. Ninety-eight percent (98%) of the lots were sold and a world record was established for the sale of the work "Falaise Noire". (See results announced in the French auction magazine La Gazette Drouot).

In November 2016 the Magen H Gallery organised the first Pierre Sabatier retrospective in the USA. Held in New York the exhibition included more than 100 works and the gallery published a 166-page book for the occasion, entitled "Substance, material, matter".

== Material and techniques ==
In the early 1960s, Pierre Sabatier began his career with large-scale murals in mosaic and ceramics. At the end of the 1960s he turned to metal, which was to become his preferred, signature material. Working with large surfaces and volumes, often using adapted tools of his own design, Pierre Sabatier worked with steel, pewter, brass, aluminium or copper. Stamped, chiseled, hammered, cut out, burnt, soldered, corroded, polished... Sabatier used all possible techniques to achieve the desired effect. The oxidation process of transforming metal through acid treatment, and for which he developed a unique know-how, is essential to the aesthetic of Sabatier's work and the key to its originality. In the 1980s Pierre Sabatier discovered new techniques with cement, that he used in creations for amusement parks and playgrounds.

To create such large-scale pieces, Pierre Sabatier worked from a vast workshop and studio in Aurouër (Allier), in the Bourbonnaise countryside near Moulins, where he trained and worked with a dedicated team of up to ten assistants.

== Selected works ==
- 1965: Aulnay-sous-Bois, France. St. Paul Church. Liturgical furniture. Choir screen in hammered copper with patina. Architect: Jean Le Couteur.
- 1967: Romorantin, France. Lycée Claude de France. Ceramic exterior 16m x 19m. Glazed porcelain tiles. Architect: François Davy. 1% commission.
- 1967: La Défense, Paris, France. Aquitaine Tower. Hall and central component. 600m2 sculpted space. Acid fresco on hammered and stamped copper. Architects: Luc et Xavier Arsène-Henry, Bernard Schoeller. Interior architect: Denis Voisin.
- 1968: Paris, France. Elisabeth Stadium. Ceramic exterior 40m x 2,50m. Enameled lava. Architect: Robert-Guy Sabrou. 1% commission.
- 1968: Grenoble, France. Grenoble Town Hall. Marriage halls, door-screens 11m x 2,50m. Crafted copper and pewter. Assembly hall, wall 12m x 3,30m. Stamped and oxidized brass. Architect: Maurice Novarina. Interior architect: Joseph-André Motte. Commissioned by the City of Grenoble and Isère Préfecture. 1% commission.
- 1969: Brussels, Belgium. Headquarters of Royale Belge. Boulevard du Souverain 25. Sculpted space, central component-auditorium 800 m2. Acid-treated and crafted brass. Architect: Pierre Dufau. Commissioned by S.A. d'Assurances.
- 1969: Bondy, France. Bondy Town Hall. Marriage halls. Wall sculpture 9m x 3,20m. Wrought pewter on copper. Interior architect: Joseph-André Motte. 1% commission.
- 1971: Créteil, France. Val de Marne Préfecture. Reception halls. Wall sculpture with sliding elements, 39m x 3,50m. Hammered, folded, bent back, openworked and oxidized copper and brass. Architect: Daniel Badani. 1% commission.
- 1974: Paris, France. 33, Rue François 1er. Parfums Rochas headquarters. Ephemeral façade following 1972 competition. 25m x 13m. Thermomodeled PVC tubes. Architect: Jean-Pierre Basile. Interior architect: Georges Ferran. Removed in 1987.
- 1975: La Défense, France. UAP - AXA Tower. CB 312. Halls. Three sculpted volumes in steel, oxidized to different degrees and with polished bevels, each volume 10m x 7m. Architects: Pierre Dufau and Jean-Pierre Dacbert.
- 1975: La Défense, France. Manhattan Tower. Sculpted environment. Waved aluminium treated with crystallized and pearled pigments. Architect: Michel Herbert.
- 1975: Paris. Maison de la Coopération Agricole – IN VIVO. 83–85, Avenue de la Grande Armée. Hall. Sculpted space. Brass, lead and wrought pewter. Architect: Jean DeMailly.
- 1975: Villetaneuse, France. Les Joncherolles Cemetery. Crematorium. Doors 6m x 3m. Pewter on wrought and overworked brass. Architect: Robert Auzelle.
- 1979: Calgary, Canada. Aquitaine Company of Canada Ltd. Hall. Sculpted space 150m2. Brass and pewter. Architects: Webb, Zerafa, Menkes, Housden. Interior architect: Denis Voisin.
- 1982: Bagdad, Iraq. International Airport. Themed terminals: Babylon, Nineveh, Samarra - 3 walls in sculpted metal, each 40m x 4m. Stamped and oxidized brass. Interior architects: Jean-Louis Berthet and Yves Pochy.
- 1994: Boulogne-Billancourt, France. New Billancourt Bridge. "Voilures" sign-sculpture. Inox. 18m high. Architect: Daniel Badani.
- 2000: La Défense, France. Notre-Dame-de-Pentecôte Church. Altar, ambon, tabernacle. Wrought and oxidized steel. Architect: Franck Hammoutène.
- 2000: La Défense, France. Coeur Défénse. Halls. 3 wall sculptures in wrought and oxidized steel, each 7,50m x 5,40m. Architect: Jean-Paul Viguier. Interior architect: Bernard Grenot.

Creation of numerous playgrounds made of process-dyed concrete, for detail refer to the website dedicated to Pierre Sabatier)

== Collections ==
Pierre Sabatier's work is represented in the MNAM/CCI collections of the Centre Georges Pompidou in Paris.

== Exhibitions ==
- 1981: Maison de la Culture de Nevers, personal exhibition
- 2015: Design Miami/Basel, Switzerland, with Magen H Gallery
- 2015 : PAD London, Magen H Gallery
- 2015 : PAD Paris, Galerie Yves Gastou
- 2015 : Exposition personnelle, Magen H Gallery (New York)
- 2016 : FOG Design + Art (San Francisco), Magen H Gallery
- 2016 : PAD London, Magen H Gallery et Chahan Gallery
- 2016 : Design Miami/Basel (Bâle et Miami), Magen H Gallery
- 2017 : FOG Design + Art (San Francisco), Magen H Gallery

Regular participation in festivals and salons:

- Salon des Artistes Décorateurs – SAD - Paris, Montréal
- Grands et Jeunes d'Aujourd'hui
- Comparaison
- Le Mur Vivant

See the detailed references on the website dedicated to Pierre Sabatier: as well as on the dedicated channel YouTube.

== Awards ==
- 1974: Médaille de Bronze des Arts Plastiques de l'Académie d'Architecture
- 1976: Médaille d'Argent des Arts Plastiques de l'Académie d'Architecture
- 2002: Chevalier de la Légion d'Honneur

== Bibliography ==
- "Pierre Sabatier, Sculpteur" by Domitille d'Orgeval (Éditions Norma : Paris 2011)
- Pierre Sabatier's work is referred to in numerous books, magazines and exhibitions catalogues, a full list of references is on the website dedicated to Pierre Sabatier
