= Ethel Tench Rogers =

American composer

Ethel Tench Rogers (February 21, 1914 – January 25, 2008) was a prolific American composer who published over 200 sacred and pedagogical compositions for organ, piano, synthesizer and voice.

Rogers was born in Newark, New Jersey, to Walter and Herrine Tench. She studied music with William Ichor, Arthur B. Kellsey, Tsuyi Matsuki, Lorrene McClintock, Edward J. McGinley, Howard Savage, and at the Austrian-American Institute in Vienna. She married Robert W. Rogers in 1934 and they had a son and a daughter.

Rogers arranged traditional hymns as well as music by Karl P. Harrington, J. Michael Haydn, William H. Jude, George C. Stebbins, and Will L. Thompson. She set biblical passages and texts by Kathryn Blackburn Peck and Isaac Watts to music.

Rogers taught piano and organ in Plainfield, New Jersey, and at the University of Missouri, Kansas City. She also presented workshops for the National Association of Organ Teachers. A Rogers Music Scholarship has been established at Baker University (Kansas).

Rogers’ compositions were published by the Boston Music Company, Lillenas Publishing Company (Nazarene Publishing House), Myklas Press, and Pro Art Publications. She often collaborated with Olive Nelson Russell:

- MELODIES AND SCALES in the most used keys by Ethel Tench Rogers and Olive Nelson Russell For all organs Westbury
- PLAY EASY SOLOS for all organs compilation arranged and original by Ethel Tench Rogers and Olive Nelson Russell
- PRO ART ALL ORGAN METHOD books 1,2,3 by Ethel Tench Rogers and Olive Nelson Russell
- PRO ART ALL ORGAN TECHNIC books 1,2,3 by Ethel Tench Rogers and Olive Nelson Russell
- SELECTED SOLOS for all organs arrangements Ethel Tench Rogers and Olive Nelson Russell
- VERY FIRST TUNES TO TRANSPOSE by Ethel Tench Rogers and Olive Nelson Russell For all organs

Rogers’ compositions included Evening Air, a piano piece for left hand alone; four cantatas; 62 books of organ works; over 150 anthems; and works for two pianos.
