= Nicolas Moutier =

Nicolas Moutier (born 3 March 1983) is a French classical trombonist, soloist at the Orchestre philharmonique de Strasbourg and teacher at the conservatoire de Strasbourg.

== Life ==
Born in Paris, Moutier, son of pianist Géry Moutier, entered the Conservatoire de Paris at the age of 17. He obtained the Trombone Prize (1st nominated, special mention of the jury) and the chamber music prize, then entered the advanced concertist cycle.

He worked with the Orchestre national du Capitole de Toulouse (as a winner of the Aida competition), and became trombone solo at the Musique de l'Air de Paris, then trombone solo at the Orchestre philharmonique de Strasbourg.

Moutier has won several international awards:

- 2nd Prize at the Prague Spring International Music Festival (2011, Czech Republic)
- 3rd Prize at the International Jeju Competition (2010, South Korea)
- Prize of the International Competition of Porcia (2007, Italy)
- 1st Grand Prize of the FMAJI International Competition
- winner of the Music Foundation of Europe
- winner of the Lyon International Chamber Music Competition (with the Feeling Brass Quintet)

Moutier regularly performs as a soloist and in recital, in France and abroad, where he also gives master classes (Russia, Japan, Taiwan, etc.).

He has recorded several disks (including Rémy Abraham's double concerto with Michel Becquet), produced several radio programs (France Musique, Czech national radio, etc.) and television (Victoires de la musique, etc.).

He is the dedicatee of several world premieres.

Moutier is a professor at the Strasbourg Conservatory and at the Haute école des arts du Rhin. He is a member of the International Eurocuivres Academy and gives master classes all over the world.

After being a member of the Feeling Brass Quintet, he was a member of the Opus 4 quartet, and is now the first trombone of the Namestra Ensemble.

Moutier is the bearer of cultural projects for the City of Strasbourg (concerts for Strasbourg Capital of Christmas, inauguration of the millennium of the cathedral, inauguration of the illuminations of the cathedral, ceremonies with the Council of Europe, etc.), he is also in the organization of several festivals in France, Switzerland, and Germany. He was the artistic director of the 2014 European Trombone Festival.

Moutier is president of the Association des Trombonistes du Bas-Rhin and vice-president of the Association des Trombonistes Français (ATF).
