= Olive Nelson Russell =

American composer and organist (1905–1989)

Olive Nelson Russell (28 September 1905 - 30 March 1989) was an American composer, organist, and pianist who wrote works for chorus, organ and piano.

== Life and career ==
Russell was born in Albert Lea, Minnesota, to Lora and Emil Nelson. She married Clarence Russell in 1935. Their son is the author Dick Russell. She studied music in Paris, and at the Sherwood Music School (today Columbia College) and the American Conservatory of Music, both in Chicago. Her teachers included Robert Casadesus and Yves Nat.

As a pianist, Russell performed in France (Bordeaux and Paris) and throughout the United States (Beloit, Dallas, Chicago, Houston, Milwaukee, Minneapolis, and New York). As a church organist, she worked in Chicago, Kansas City, and Minneapolis. She was a keyboard instructor at MacPhail College of Music from 1942 to 1947, and at the University of Missouri Kansas City from 1961 to 1971. Russell also gave a keyboard workshop at the El Paso Institute of the Arts in 1974. Russell died on 30 March 1989 in Aurora, Colorado.

Russell composed organ and choral works suitable for church performance, and teaching pieces for piano. She often collaborated with Ethel Tench Rogers. Many of her piano pieces were included in pedagogy collections. Her works were published by Belwin Mills Publishing Corp., CPP/Belwin Inc., Harold Flammer Inc., J Fischer & Bro., ProArt Publications, and Summy Birchard.

== List and compositions ==
=== Choral ===
- The Adoration (SSAA or SATB with piano or organ)
- We’re on the Job (mixed voices; text by Clarence Russell)

=== Organ ===
- Ancient Noels from the French Provinces
- Favorite Hymns for All Organs (arranged with Ethel Tench Rogers)
- Melodies and Scales in Most Used Keys (with Ethel Tench Rogers)
- Music for the Communion Service
- Play Easy Solos (with Ethel Tench Rogers)
- ProArt All Organ Method vol 1, 2, and 3 (with Ethel Tench Rogers)
- ProArt All Organ Technic vol 1, 2 and 3 (with Ethel Tench Rogers)
- Selected Solos (with Ethel Tench Rogers)
- Spirituals
- Very First Tunes to Transpose (with Ethel Tench Rogers)

=== Piano ===
- Many teaching pieces
- Easy Turnabout Duets
- Island Song
- Mariachi Band
- Scotch Plaid
