= Laurent Cabasso =

French classical pianist

Laurent Cabasso (born 25 August 1961) is a French contemporary classical pianist.

== Biography ==
Laurent Cabasso studied at the conservatoire de Paris. In 1982 he obtained the third prize at the Concours Géza Anda in Zurich.

He is a teacher at the conservatoire de Strasbourg and assistant professor at the CNSMDP.

== Discography ==
- 2011 - Beethoven: Diabelli Variations; Schubert: Wanderer Fantasy, Variation on a valz by Diabelli (Naïve Records)
- Schumann: Choc du Monde de la musique, Télérama
- Prokofiev: Grand prix du disque de l'Académie du disque français
- Shostakovich/Prokofiev with Sonia Wieder-Atherton: Joker of Crescendo
- Beethoven: selected in Le Monde among the best records of the year
- Diapason d'or for his recording dedicated to Liszt with organist Olivier Vernet.

His latest recording of Beethoven's "Diabelli Variations" and Schubert's "Wanderer-Fantasy", which appeared at the end of 2011 at Naïve records, was unanimously hailed by the press. The record was selected by France Musique and Télérama where Gilles Macassar wrote: "His recording imposes itself from the start with such a strong evidence, such an impression of "that's it", that one is certain to hold an interpretation that will be a landmark. A reference version? Better: a commitment sovereignly personal, both fully free and scrupulously exact!".
