= Philippe Tamborini =

French classical pianist

Philippe Tamborini (born 23 May 1958) is a French classical pianist and teacher.

== Early life ==
Tamborini began studying the piano at age seven. He studied at the Schola Cantorum de Paris with Nadia Tagrine and joined the Conservatoire de Paris in 1976.

== Career ==
In 1981, he won his first prizes in piano and chamber music in Jacques Rouvier and Geneviève Joy's classes, as well as the certificate of accompaniment in Anne Grapotte's class. After leaving the Conservatoire, he perfected his skills with Russian masters such as Yevgeny Malinin, Lev Naumov and Helena Varvarova.

He performs regularly in concert in France (Théâtre du Châtelet, Auditorium Saint-Germain, salle Debussy-Pleyel, Musicora, the Cité des Sciences, the "Espace Carpeaux" in Courbevoie, the "Espace Croix-Baragnon" in Toulouse...) and abroad (Friebourg, Geneva, Rome, Barcelona, Dublin...) as soloist and chamber music performer.

He has been teaching piano at the Conservatoire de Paris since 1993.
