= Gisèle Magnan =

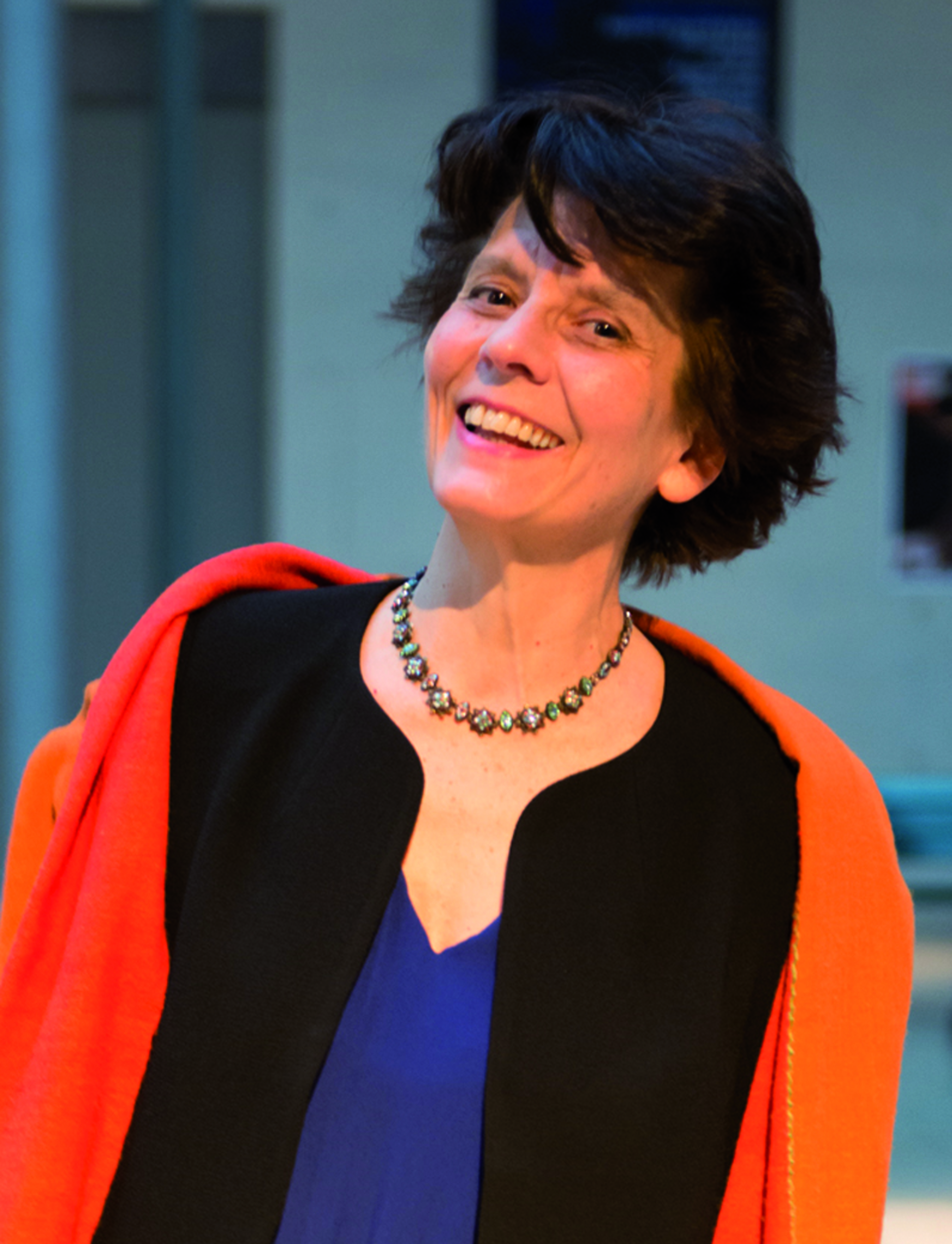

Background information
- Origin: France
- Genres: Classical
- Occupation: Pianist
- Instrument: Piano

Gisèle Magnan is a French classical pianist, founder and director of the association "Les Concerts de poche" that seeks to democratize classical music.

== Biography ==
Magnan began playing the piano at the age of seven at the Schola Cantorum de Paris, with Nadia Tagrine and Alfred Loewenguth. At 13, she entered the Conservatoire de Paris. There, she studied the piano with Vlado Perlemuter, chamber music with Geneviève Joy and music analysis with Betsy Jolas. She occasionally followed the teachings of the Austrian pianist Lili Kraus and the Russian pianist Dmitri Bashkirov. Magnan won three First prizes unanimously: piano (first nominated in the competition), chamber music and analysis. At the age of 19, when a concert career opened up for her, she decided to step back and perfect her art with the pianist Jean-Rodolphe Kars. Her musical "retirement" lasted four years, during which she also benefited from the teaching of the Russian pianist Nikita Magaloff and the advice of the Romanian conductor Sergiu Celibidache.

Gisèle Magnan's solo career really began in 1982. Hailed by Le Monde de la musique as "one of the best pianists of her generation", she quickly established herself on the French and international scene.

A committed pianist and mother of four children, Magnan suffers from the widening gap between classical music and the general public. To make this art accessible to the greatest number, she founded "Les Concerts de poche" in 2002 with the harpsichordist-composer Pierre-Alain Braye-Weppe, The association, which aims to bring great artists of classical music, jazz and opera to the countryside and neighbourhoods, really began its activities in 2005. Magnan organizes musical practice workshops and concerts (violinist Augustin Dumay, pianists Jean-Marc Luisada and Michel Dalberto, etc.) in community halls and neighbourhood houses. In 2007, Magnan ended her concert career to devote herself fully to the development of the "Concerts de Poche", whose head office is located at Féricy, in Seine-et-Marne.

Attached to transmission, Magnan continues to accompany young pianists such as Thomas Enhco and Jonathan Fournel. She also conducts workshops at the Conservatoire de Paris.

== Selected discography ==
- Beethoven's Piano Sonata No. 31 Op 110, 32 variations in C minor, Piano Sonata No. 21 Op 53, Adda, 1989 Choc du Monde de la Musique.
- Brahms's Variations and Fugue on a Theme by Handel Op 24, Six Pieces for Piano, Op. 118, Adès, 1995
