= Michel Michalakakos =

French violinist

Michel Michalakakos (born in 1954) is a French contemporary violist.

== Biography ==
Born in Athens, Michalakakos began to study viola at the age of thirteen with his father, Christos Michalakakos, and then entered the Conservatoire de Paris in Colette Lequien's class (alto), and Joseph Calvet's one (chamber music). He left in 1977 with a First Prize in viola while a year later, in 1978, he obtained his teaching certificate.

From 1979 to 1984 he joined the Orchestre National de France and from 1981 to 1993 he joined the Paris String Trio, with Jean Grout and Charles Frey.

He regularly performs with French and foreign orchestras and gives sonata recitals, notably with the pianist Martine Gagnepain, with whom he recorded several records. His chamber music partners include Roland Daugareil, Patrice Fontanarosa, Jean-Jacques Kantorow, Gérard Jarry, Régis Pasquier, Jean-Marc Phillips, Gérard Poulet, Vladimir Mendelsson, Henri Demarquette, Roland Pidoux, Bernard Cazauran, Isabelle Moretti, Philippe Bernold, Jean Ferrandis, Patrick Gallois, Maxence Larrieu, Michel Arrignon, Pascal Devoyon, the Élysée, Manfred, and Parisii Quartets.

Interested in all types of music, it is not uncommon to see him participate in concerts of tango, jazz, romani music, traditional folk music.

Since 1991, he has been a professor of sight reading at the Conservatoire de Paris but also a viola teacher at the Boulogne-Billancourt Conservatory since 1990. In addition to these activities, he teaches viola and chamber music as part of internships, international academies and masterclasses.

He often participates in master-classes at the Toulouse Conservatory.
