= Aldo Ciccolini =

Italian pianist (1925–2015)

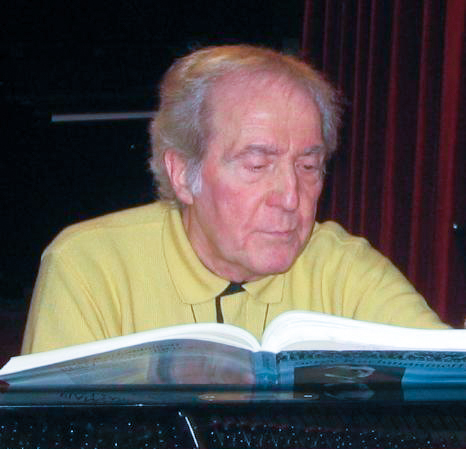
Aldo Ciccolini in 2005

Aldo Ciccolini (Italian pronunciation: [ˈaldo tʃikkoˈliːni]; 15 August 1925 – 1 February 2015) was an Italian pianist who became a naturalized French citizen in 1971.

== Biography ==
Aldo Ciccolini was born in Naples. His father, whose family bore the title of Marquis in the city of Macerata, worked as a typographer. Aldo Ciccolini took his first lessons with Maria Vigliarolo d'Ovidio, and entered Naples Conservatory in 1934 at the age of 9, with special permission of the director, Francesco Cilea. There he studied piano with Paolo Denza, a pupil of Ferruccio Busoni, and harmony and counterpoint with Achille Longo.

He began his performing career playing at the Teatro San Carlo at the age of 16. However, by 1946 he was forced to play in bars to support his family. In 1949, he won, ex-aequo (tied) with Ventsislav Yankov, the Marguerite Long - Jacques Thibaud Competition in Paris (among the other prizewinners were Paul Badura-Skoda and Pierre Barbizet). He became a French citizen in 1971 and taught at the Conservatoire de Paris from 1970 to 1988, where his students included Akiko Ebi, Jean-Yves Thibaudet, Artur Pizarro, Géry Moutier, Nicholas Angelich, André Sayasov and Jean-Luc Kandyoti. Other students included Fabio Mengozzi, Francesco Libetta, Antonio Pompa-Baldi, Domenico Piccichè, Ivan Donchev, Mark Bebbington and Jean-Marc Savelli.

Ciccolini was a celebrated interpreter and advocate of the piano music of the French composers Camille Saint-Saëns, Maurice Ravel, Claude Debussy, Charles-Valentin Alkan and Erik Satie as well as that of less prominent composers such as Déodat de Séverac, Jules Massenet and Alexis de Castillon.

Ciccolini was known for his having played the music of the Spanish composers Isaac Albéniz, Enrique Granados, and Manuel de Falla, as well as of Franz Liszt. Soprano Dame Elisabeth Schwarzkopf said of him "I have hardly met a more wonderful partner and a more delightful companion."

On 9 December 1999, he celebrated a career in France spanning 50 years with a recital at the Théâtre des Champs-Élysées in Paris.

In 2008, he was appointed commander of the French National Order of Merit.

== Death ==
Aldo Ciccolini died on 1 February 2015 at his Paris residence, aged 89.

== Recordings ==
Ciccolini made more than a hundred recordings for EMI-Pathé Marconi and other record companies, including the complete sonata cycles of Mozart and Beethoven, the complete solo piano work of Debussy and two separate cycles of the complete piano works of Satie.

In 2002, Ciccolini was awarded the Diapason d'Or for his recording of the entire solo piano works of Janáček for Abeille Music and of Schumann for Cascavelles. His complete Beethoven sonata cycle was re-published by the Cascavelle label in 2006. He also recorded such unusual repertoire as selections from the Péchés de vieillesse by Rossini and the complete piano music of Massenet.

== Honours and awards ==
- Officier of the Order of the Legion of Honour (1996)
- Commandeur of the Ordre des Arts et des Lettres
- Commandeur of the Ordre National du Mérite

== Sources ==
- Article on Aldo Ciccolini in French Wikipedia
- Bellamy, Olivier. Courage and silence. Essay included in Aldo Ciccolini: Enregistrements EMI 1950–1991 EMI 2009
