= François Sabatier =

French musicologist

François Sabatier (born in 1945) is a French musicologist, music historian and music educator.

== Biography ==
François Sabatier studied music history and musicology at the Conservatoire de Paris and the Paris-Sorbonne University.

The author of books on the relationship between music, literature and the fine arts, Sabatier also participates in the writing of notices in musical encyclopedias and articles in musicology journals. He is the editor of L'Orgue magazine and a member of the Organs committee of the City of Paris.

In 1996, he won the grand prix des Muses for Miroirs de la musique.

Since 1982, he has been a professor of art and civilization and music history at the Conservatoire de Lyon.

== Publications ==
- Books
  - Miroirs de la musique; la musique et ses correspondances avec la littérature et les beaux-arts de la Renaissance aux Lumières; XVe - XVIIIe siècles, vol. I, Fayard, col. Les Indispensables de la musique, Paris, 1998, 672 p. ISBN 9782213600895
  - Miroirs de la musique; XIXe - XXe siècles, vol. II, Fayard, Paris, 1998, 744 p. ISBN 9782213601441
  - La Musique dans la prose française; des Lumières à Marcel Proust, Fayard, Paris, 2004, 748 p. ISBN 9782213620855
  - Petit dictionnaire de la poésie mélomane; musique et poésie en France de 1800 à 1950, Zurfluh, series Le Temps musical, Bourg-la-Reine, 1997, 159 p. ISBN 2-87750-076-4
  - César Franck et l'orgue, Presses universitaires de France, series Que sais-je ?, 1982, 127 p. ISBN 2-13-037004-7
- Articles in collective publications
  - Henri Mulet et al. in Grove Dictionary of Music and Musicians, Oxford Music Online, 2010
  - Pierre Cochereau et al., in Guide de la musique d'orgue, dir. Gilles Cantagrel, Paris, 1991, ISBN 9782213027722
  - 25 ans CNSMD Lyon, dir. François Sabatier, éditions Symétrie, Paris, 2005, 272 p. ISBN 978-2-914373-19-7
  - L'Orgue, dir. François Sabatier, n° 247-248 and préc., éditions Symétrie, Paris, 2010, 272 p. ISSN 0030-5170
  - Le Guide de la Musique d'Orgue, dir. Gilles Cantagrel, Paris, Fayard, series Les indispensables de la musique, 2012 ISBN 9782213671390
