= Lucette Descaves =

French pianist and teacher

Lucette Descaves (1 April 1906 – 15 April 1993) was a French pianist and teacher, whose pupils included Jean-Yves Thibaudet, Geneviève Joy, Brigitte Engerer, Pascal Rogé, and Katia and Marielle Labèque.

== Biography ==
Born in Paris, daughter of the police commissioner Eugène Descaves (brother of the writer Lucien Descaves) and goddaughter of Camille Saint-Saëns, Lucette Descaves studied piano, encouraged by her mother. She entered the Paris Conservatoire while Gabriel Fauré was the director, in the class of Marguerite Long. Having won first prize for piano in 1923, she was herself put in charge of Long's preparatory class (during the Second World War, she taught the young student Michel Legrand, who in 1988 asked her to appear in his autobiographical film Cinq Jours en Juin). Subsequently, she became Yves Nat's teaching assistant. Lucette Descaves was regarded by Marguerite Long as her spiritual heir. In 1941, Descaves was made a piano professor at the Conservatoire.

As a pianist, she has premiered works by Jolivet (ritual dances, 1942 Concerto for piano, 1951) and Rivier (Concerto for Piano, 1954).

Until her retirement from the Conservatoire in 1976, she taught several outstanding pianists, including Jean-Yves Thibaudet, Geneviève Joy, Brigitte Engerer, Pascal Rogé, Katia and Marielle Labèque, Géry Moutier and Georges Pludermacher. Upon retirement of the Conservatory, she continued her teaching at the Rueil-Malmaison conservatory, directed by one of her former students, Jacques Taddei. See: List of music students by teacher: C to F#Lucette Descaves.

She also had a career as a concert soloist, performing under conductors such as Philippe Gaubert, Charles Münch and Andre Cluytens. She performed and premiered much contemporary music, most notably works by André Jolivet (Cinq danses rituelles, the Piano Concerto) and Jean Rivier. She also performed works by Gabriel Pierné and Bohuslav Martinů, and performed Sergei Prokofiev's Third Piano Concerto before the composer on 25 October 1931 at the Concerts Poulet.

She studied the complete piano works of Albert Roussel and Arthur Honegger with the composers before recording them on LP.

She was first married to the conductor and pianist Georges Truc (died 1941), artistic director of Pathé-Marconi France; she then married the conductor Louis Fourestier. She died aged 87 in Boulogne-Billancourt.
