= Raphaël Oleg =

French violinist, violist and conductor (born 1959)

Raphaël Oleg (born 8 September 1959) is a French violinist, violist and conductor.

== Biography ==
Born in Paris, Raphaël Oleg is the son of composer Alexandre Oleg. He began playing the violin at the age of seven with Hélène Arnitz, then, at the age of twelve, entered the Conservatoire de Paris in the class of Gérard Jarry. He also attended the lessons of chamber music of Maurice Crut and won his first prizes in 1976. He perfected his skills with Henryk Szeryng in Geneva, took music analysis classes with Betsy Jolas, and then worked with Pierre Amoyal when he was a laureate of the Long-Thibaud-Crespin Competition (3rd prize, 1977), Christian Ferras, Emmanuel Krivine and Jean-Jacques Kantorow.

In 1984, he was appointed a professor at the Fontainebleau Schools and in 1986, he was the first French to win the International Tchaikovsky Competition. Since 1995 he has been teaching at the City of Basel Music Academy.

He plays on a violin by the Lyon-based maker Jacques Fustier, made especially for him in 1987.

== Premieres ==
- Renaud Gagneux, Concerto for violin (1999)
- Ivo Malec, Ottava alta (1995)
- Serge Nigg, Concerto for violin n°2 (2000)
- Philippe Racine, Concerto for violin (2001)

== Honours ==
- 1997: prize of the Del Duca Foundation
- Chevalier des Arts et Lettres

== Bibliography ==
- Pâris, Alain (2004). "Oleg, Raphaël". Dictionnaire des interprètes et de l'interprétation musicale depuis 1900. Bouquins (in French). Paris: Éditions Robert Laffont. pp. 649–650. ISBN 2-221-10214-2. OCLC 300283821. Pâris 2004.
