= Bonaventure-Hypolithe Sabatier =

French officer

Bonaventure-Hypolithe Sabatier (14 July 1773 – 18 October 1842) was a French officer who was promoted to the rank of General de Brigade during the Hundred Days in 1815.

== Bibliography ==
- Broughton, Tony (18 June 2010), Burnham, Robert (ed.), "Generals of Napoleon's Hundred Days Officers promoted to the rank of General de Brigade", napoleon-series.org
