= La Gazette Drouot =

French periodical about art auctions

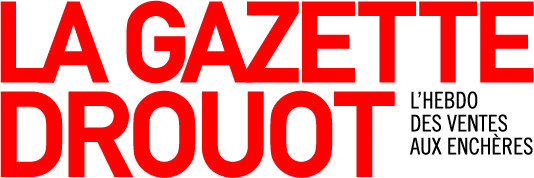
- Type: Weekly magazine
- Owner: Drouot Patrimoine (holding company)
- Editor-in-chief: Olivier Lange
- Founded: February 8, 1891; 135 years ago
- Language: French (print and online), English (online only)
- Headquarters: 18 Boulevard Montmartre; 75009 Paris; France
- Circulation: 24,288 (total, 2026)
- ISSN: 1169-2294
- Website: gazette-drouot.com

La Gazette Drouot is a French weekly magazine specialising in public auctions, works of art, antiques and the art market. Founded in 1891 under the title L'Hôtel Drouot, it covers auction activity, art objects, exhibitions, museums, artists and developments in the art trade.

== History ==
The publication was established in Paris in February 1891. Its first issues appeared under the title L'Hôtel Drouot, before the periodical adopted the name Gazette de l'Hôtel Drouot later that month. The publication was created in connection with the auction market and initially focused on public sales and auction announcements. Auctioneer Charles Oudart is credited with founding the publication. During its early years, it was issued daily and contained information about public auctions and other material related to the art trade. The periodical changed its publication frequency in February 1896, when it began appearing two or three times per week. Its contents gradually expanded beyond auction notices to include articles about art, artists, exhibitions, collections and cultural subjects. The publication became a weekly in 1945. During the following decades, it developed from a newspaper primarily associated with auction announcements into a magazine covering the art market and the wider art world. Its editorial content included articles about artists and artworks, exhibition reports, cultural subjects and specialist information for collectors and art professionals.

The publication was acquired by Drouot in 1968, according to a 2002 report in Le Monde about the auction house's business and ownership structure. The magazine's format and visual presentation evolved over time. Illustrations began appearing in the late nineteenth century, while photographic material became more prominent in the early twentieth century. Colour printing was introduced during the second half of the 1980s. The publication established an online presence in 1996. Its digital platform provides articles and information about auctions, alongside editorial material related to the art market. The digitisation of historical issues has also contributed to the preservation and accessibility of the publication's archives. In March 2021, the Institut national d'histoire de l'art (INHA) made the first sixty years of the periodical, covering February 1891 to December 1950, available through its digital library. The project was undertaken to improve access to the historical collection and to preserve fragile newspaper material.

== Editorial content ==
La Gazette Drouot covers public auctions and the art market, including paintings, furniture, decorative arts, antiques and other collectible objects. Its editorial content includes auction previews, sale reports, market information, articles about artists and objects, exhibition coverage, movie review and cultural news. The magazine also publishes articles examining artworks, collections, museums and developments in the art trade. Its coverage extends beyond Paris to auctions and art-market activity in other parts of France and internationally. La Gazette Drouot is published weekly in French. Its print edition is distributed through newsstands and subscriptions. The publication also operates a website containing articles, auction information, results and digital editions. An English-language digital edition, La Gazette Drouot International, provides selected editorial content about auctions, the art market and cultural subjects to an international audience. The publication also produces Le Drouot, an annual edition presenting a selection of notable objects sold at Drouot during the preceding auction season.

== Archives ==
Historical issues of La Gazette de l'Hôtel Drouot from February 1891 to December 1950 have been digitised and made accessible through the digital library of the Institut national d'histoire de l'art. The collection provides a historical record of auctions, dealers, collectors, artworks and art-market activity during the period. The periodical is catalogued by the Bibliothèque nationale de France, which records its publication history, title changes and successive publication frequencies.
