= Edwin Fischer =

Swiss musician (1886–1960)

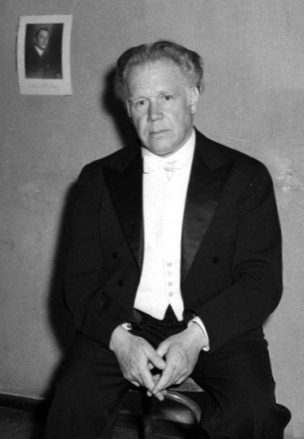
Edwin Fischer in the wardrobe of the Mozarteum concert hall before his concert on 7 August 1946

Edwin Fischer (6 October 1886 – 24 January 1960) was a Swiss classical pianist and conductor. He is regarded as one of the great interpreters of J.S. Bach and Mozart in the twentieth century.

== Biography ==
Fischer was born in Basel and studied music first there with Hans Huber, and later in Berlin at the Stern Conservatory under Martin Krause. He first came to prominence as a pianist following World War I. In 1926, he became conductor of the Lübeck Musikverein and later conducted in Munich. In 1932, he formed his own chamber orchestra, and was one of the first to be interested in presenting music of the Baroque and Classical periods in a historically accurate way. Although his performances were not historically accurate by present-day standards, they were for his time; e.g., he did conduct Bach and Mozart concertos from the keyboard, an unusual practice at that time.

In 1932, he returned once again to Berlin, succeeding Artur Schnabel in a teaching role at the Berlin Hochschule für Musik, who had emigrated from Germany because of increasing anti-Semitism. In 1942, he moved back to Switzerland, temporarily putting his career on hold through World War II. After the war he began to perform again, and gave master classes in Lucerne for a number of later prominent pianists such as Alfred Brendel, Helena Sá e Costa, Mario Feninger, Reine Gianoli, Anna Renfer, Paul Badura-Skoda and Daniel Barenboim.

As well as solo recitals, concerto performances and conducting, Fischer performed much chamber music. Particularly highly regarded was the piano trio he formed with the cellist Enrico Mainardi and the violinist Georg Kulenkampff (who was replaced by Wolfgang Schneiderhan after Kulenkampff's death).

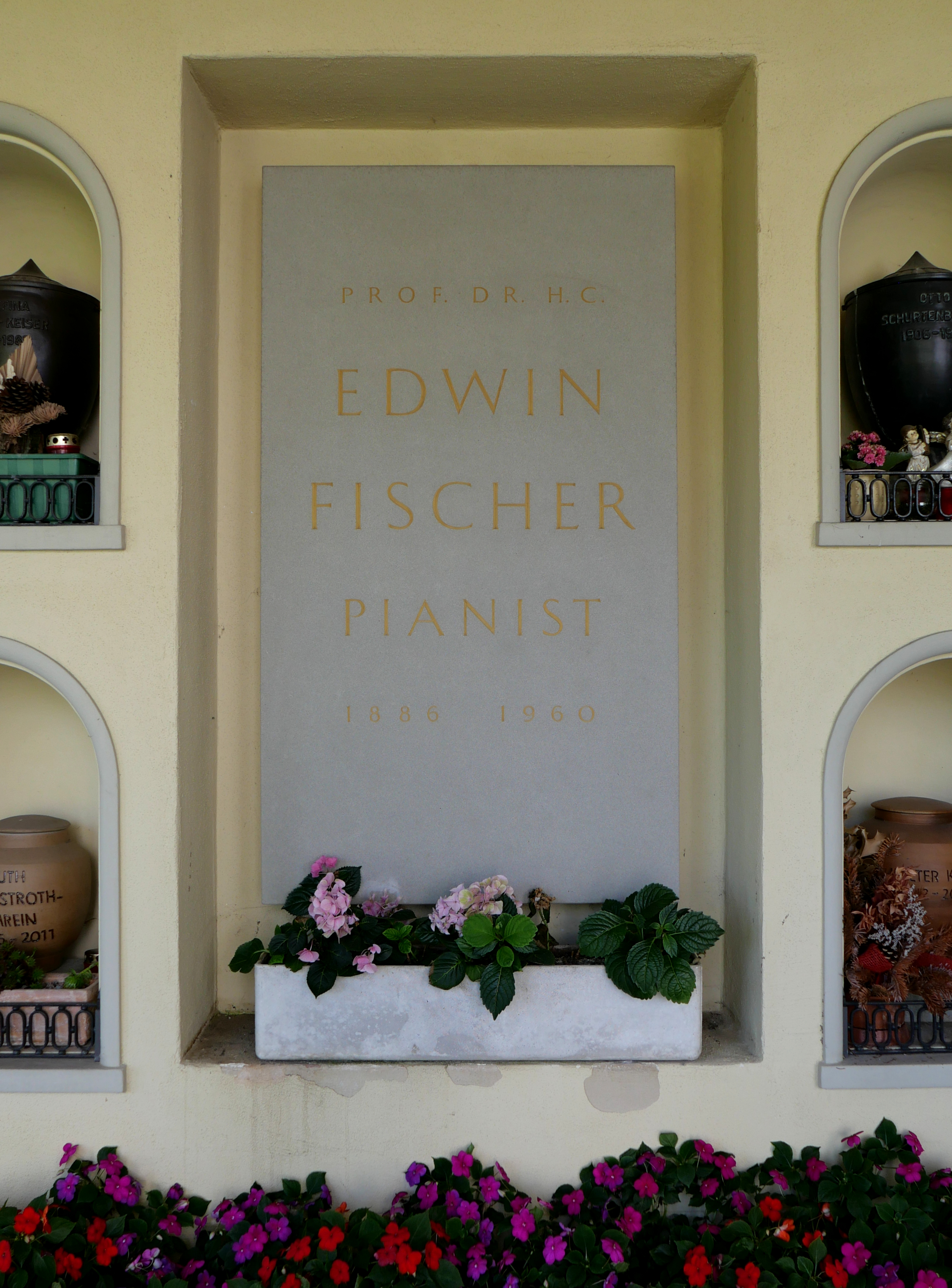
The grave in 2024.

Fischer published a number of books on teaching, and one on the piano sonatas of Ludwig van Beethoven. He also made a number of recordings, including the first complete recording of Bach's Well-Tempered Clavier for EMI Records, recorded on the piano from 1933 to 1936. Fischer's historically important recordings have been reissued on CD by EMI and specialty labels such as APR, Music & Arts, Pearl and Testament. Other classic recordings by Fischer include Bach keyboard concertos, miscellaneous solo Bach works such as the Chromatic Fantasia and Fugue, various sonatas by Mozart and Beethoven, Schubert's Wanderer Fantasy and Impromptus, Beethoven's Emperor and Brahms' Second Piano Concerto, both conducted by Wilhelm Furtwängler, and Mozart concertos K. 453, 466, 482, 491 and 503, the last three conducted by John Barbirolli, Lawrance Collingwood and Josef Krips in 1935, 1937 and 1947 respectively.

Fischer also accompanied Elisabeth Schwarzkopf in a 1950s EMI LP of Schubert Lieder. His last musical collaboration was with the violinist Gioconda de Vito. During their recording sessions for the Johannes Brahms first and third violin sonatas, he had to go to London for medical treatment, where he was told he was seriously ill. He died shortly afterwards in Zürich. His body was cremated and his ashes buried at the Friedental cemetery in Lucerne.

== Bibliography ==
- Fischer, Edwin, Musikalische Betrachtungen, Im Infel 1949 (Reflections on Music) (French Edition: Considérations sur la musique, Editions du Coudrier, 1951)
- Fischer, Edwin, Ludwig van Beethovens Klaviersonaten: Ein Begleiter für Studierende und Liebhaber, 1954 (Beethoven's Piano Sonatas: A Guide for Students and Amateurs, 1959)
- Fischer, Edwin, Johann Sebastian Bach: Eine Studie

== Sources ==
- Bredow, Moritz von. 2012. "Rebellische Pianistin. Das Leben der Grete Sultan zwischen Berlin und New York." (Biography on Edwin Fischer's student, Grete Sultan. Many details referring to Fischer and another student, Katja Andy. In German.). Schott Music, Mainz, Germany.ISBN 978-3-7957-0800-9
- Gavoty, Bernard, Edwin Fischer (in French)
- (collective) Dank an Edwin Fischer, Brockhaus 1962 (Tribute to Edwin Fischer)
