= Devy Erlih =

French violinist (1928–2012)

Devy Erlih (Paris, 5 November 1928 – Paris, 7 February 2012) was a French violinist and the 1955 winner of the Long-Thibaud competition.

== Background ==
Erlih was born in France in 1928 to first-generation immigrants to France from Bessarabia (now Moldova). His father was a folk musician who played the cimbalon and pan pipes. His parents made sure that he spoke only French so that he would not be known as an immigrant.

== Bibliography ==
- Sultan, Sophie (2018). Devy Erlih, portrait d'un violoniste pionnier (1928-2012). Rouen: Editions du Robec. ISBN 978-2-9564-338-0-4.
