= Yves Nat =

French pianist and composer (1890–1956)

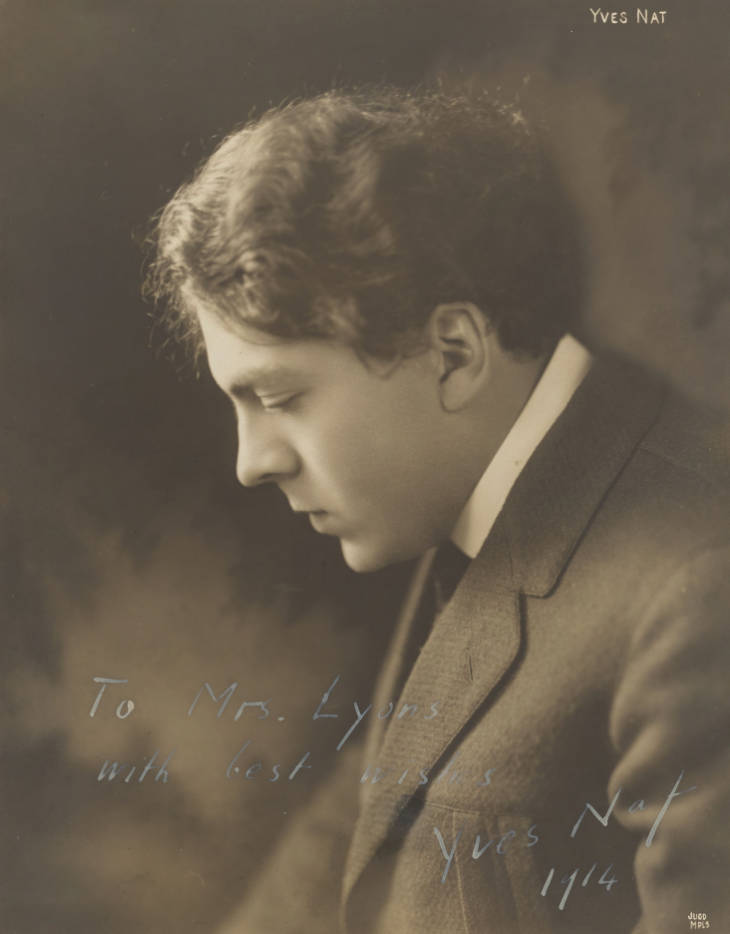
Nat (1 February 1914)

Yves Philippe Avit Nat (29 December 1890 – 31 August 1956) was a French pianist and composer.

== Biography ==
Nat was born in Béziers and showed an early aptitude for both piano and composition. By the age of seven he was allowed to improvise each Sunday at the organ of Béziers' cathedral during mass. At the age of ten he conducted his own Fantasie for orchestra.

Both Gabriel Fauré and Camille Saint-Saëns encouraged him to pursue his studies at the Conservatoire de Paris in the master class of the pianist Louis Diémer, receiving the class first prize in 1907. He dedicated himself to chamber music, undertook concert tours with the violinist Jacques Thibaud and George Enescu and appeared frequently in a duo with Eugène Ysaÿe. In 1911 he made the first of a number of tours of the United States. He was mobilised in the course of the First World War, around which time he produced the first of his published compositions, the Six Préludes pour Piano and the Six chansons à Païney.

In the years which followed, Nat toured and performed extensively. However, he retired from concert life in 1937 to devote himself to teaching in the Paris Conservatoire and composing. He emerged from this retirement in 1953 to play a small number of highly successful concerts. The last of these, on 4 February 1954 was the première of his own Piano Concerto, with the Orchestre National de la Radio-diffusion Française under the conductorship of Pierre Dervaux, at the Théâtre des Champs-Élysées in Paris. His most notable pupils include Fabienne Jacquinot, Jacqueline Eymar, Reine Gianoli, Santos Ojeda, Jean Martin, Jörg Demus, Gérard Frémy, Frederic Gevers, Geneviève Joy, Lucette Descaves, Jean-Bernard Pommier, Olive Nelson Russell, Pierre Sancan, Jean Derbès, Jacques Loussier and Jean-Marie Beaudet.

He died in Paris, aged 65, in 1956.

== Repertoire and reputation ==
His repertoire particularly covered the works of Schubert, Schumann and Brahms. Between 1951 and 1955, he recorded all 32 of the Beethoven piano sonatas. For a French pianist of his age, this recorded repertoire was unusual. Most French pianists who developed artistically in the years during and after the First World War tended to champion French composers and to avoid the staple German repertoire. Besides some of his Chopin, no recordings survive of Nat's extensive French repertoire.

Nat's strong technique and rich sonority suited the larger-scale Beethoven sonatas admirably. However, he was far from a bravura pianist - indeed, although his concerto has some formidable technical difficulties, it avoids the classic virtuoso approach, and instead tries to be what Nat himself described in a radio interview as a concerto for piano within the orchestra. He summed up his approach as Tout pour la musique; rien pour le piano, which might be translated as "Everything for the music, nothing for the piano".

His compositions reveal a composer who has a talent for framing simple melodic lines in imaginative harmonies, best illustrated by the slow movement of his piano concerto. His orchestral style is reminiscent of the style of Ravel, with a notable fondness for percussion instruments.

Beside the concerto and solo piano works, he composed chamber music and an oratorio.

== Bibliography ==
- Reverchon, Mona (2006). Yves Nat, un musicien de légende [Yves Nat, a legendary musician] (in French). Le Bord de L'eau. ISBN 2915651531. LCCN 2007353893. OL 19273413M.
- Nat, Yves (2006). Notes et Carnets (in French) (Alba ed.). ISBN 2911751442. OL 20159452M.
- Yves Nat, du pianiste compositeur au poète pédagogue, Claude Jouanna, Editions L'Harmattan, Univers musical, ISBN 2-7475-9139-5, November 2005, 248 pages
