= Jean-Yves Thibaudet =

French pianist (born 1961)

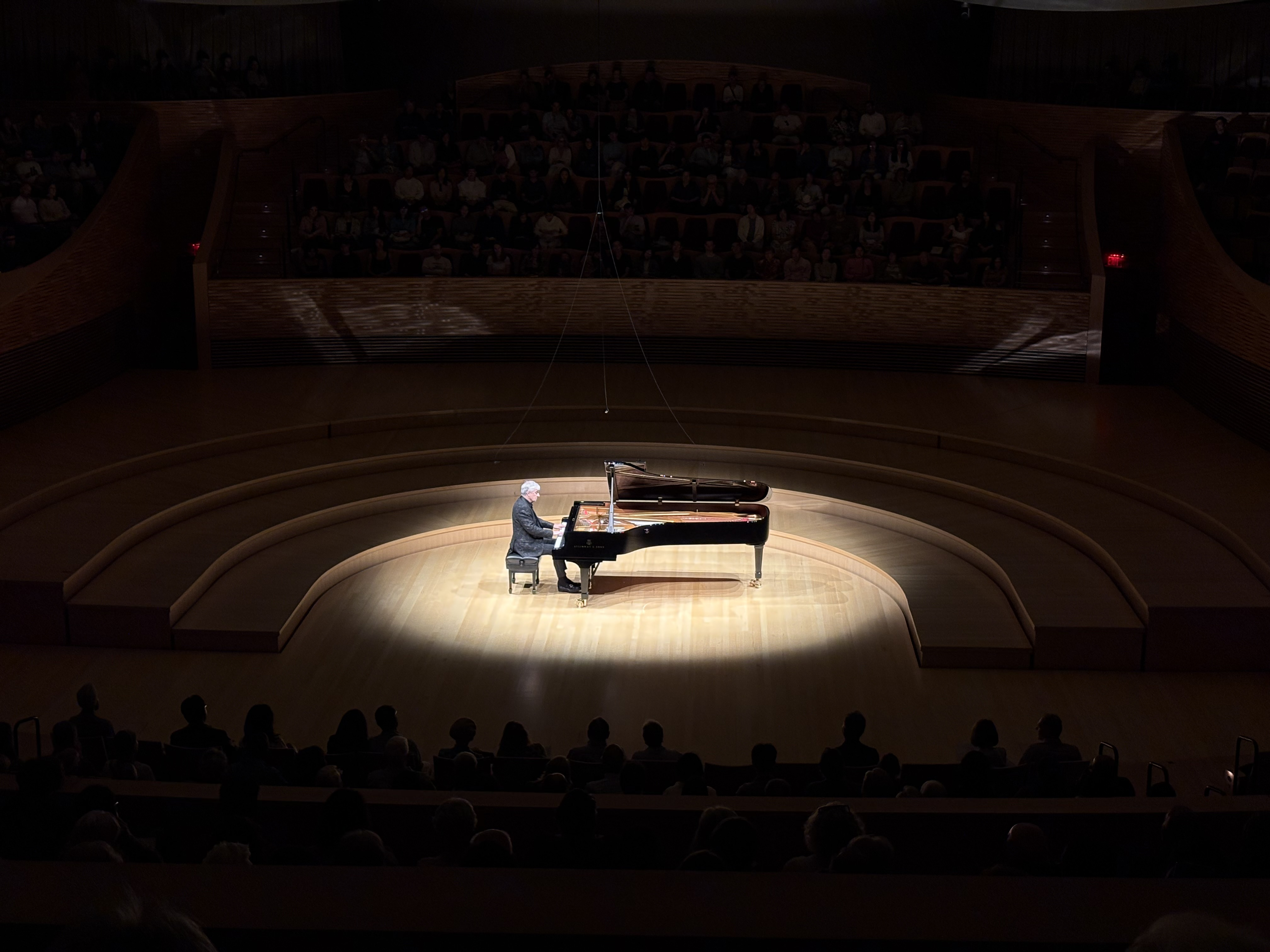
- Thibaudet performing at Stanford University

Background information
- Born: 7 September 1961 (age 65); Lyon, France
- Genre: Classical
- Occupation: Musician
- Instrument: Piano
- Label: Decca Classics
- Website: jeanyvesthibaudet.com

Jean-Yves Thibaudet (born 7 September 1961) is a French pianist. He recorded more then 50 albums.

== Early life and education ==
Thibaudet was born in Lyon, France, to non-professional musical parents. His father played the violin, and his mother, of German origin and a somewhat accomplished pianist herself, introduced the instrument to him.

Thibaudet entered the Conservatoire de Lyon at the age of five and began studying the piano. He made his first public appearance at the age of seven. He won a gold medal at the Conservatoire when he was twelve and subsequently entered the Conservatoire de Paris, where he studied with Aldo Ciccolini and Lucette Descaves. Three years later, he won the Premier Prix du Conservatoire and at the age of eighteen, won the Young Concert Artists Auditions in New York.

== Career ==
Thibaudet has performed with most of the world's leading orchestras including the Berlin Philharmonic, Royal Concertgebouw Orchestra, London Symphony Orchestra, Gewandhausorchester Leipzig, Orchestre de Paris, New York Philharmonic, Chicago Symphony Orchestra, Cleveland Orchestra and the Los Angeles Philharmonic. He has also appeared in the major concert halls of Europe, North America and Asia. In 2010, he was inducted into the Hollywood Bowl Hall of Fame.

Thibaudet also holds the honor of being the first ever Artist-in-Residence at the Boston Symphony Orchestra, Seattle Symphony Orchestra and the Colburn School in Los Angeles.

Among Thibaudet’s collaborators in performances and recordings are soprano Renée Fleming; mezzo-sopranos Cecilia Bartoli and Angelika Kirchschlager; violist Yuri Bashmet; violinists Joshua Bell, Midori, Lisa Batiashvili, Janine Jansen and Julia Fischer; cellists Truls Mørk, Daniel Müller-Schott, and Gautier Capuçon; and the Rossetti String Quartet. He also commissioned a piano concerto from James MacMillan, which he premiered with the Minnesota Orchestra in 2011.

Notably, Thibaudet's recording of Liszt drew rare praise from the great Vladimir Horowitz, who remarked, “It was amazing, such dexterity, such technique, such articulation, such command.”

=== Recordings ===
Thibaudet has made more than 50 recordings, most for the British label Decca Records. He made a box set of Erik Satie's complete works for solo piano, released on the composer's 150th birthday.

Thibaudet is well known for his interpretations of French classical music but has also made forays into the world of jazz, playing arrangements and transcriptions of improvisations on the CDs Conversations with Bill Evans (1997) and Reflections on Duke (1999).

Thibaudet is also known for his recordings of opera transcriptions. In 1993, he recorded arrangements of extracts from operas by Franz Liszt and Ferruccio Busoni. In 2007, Thibaudet released a CD entitled Aria: Opera Without Words, in which he selected several of his favorite arias and overtures, including some of his own transcriptions and those of Yvar Mikhashoff. He has since recorded a disc of Piano Concertos Nos. 2 and 5 by Camille Saint-Saëns (with Charles Dutoit and the Orchestre de la Suisse Romande, released in October 2007), and a disc of Gershwin works for piano and orchestra in Grofé's arrangements (released March 2010).

Thibaudet has also recorded compositions by composers including Addinsell, Brahms, Chopin, Debussy, d'Indy, Grieg, Liszt, Mendelssohn, Messiaen, Claus Ogerman, Rachmaninoff, Ravel, Satie, Schumann, and Richard Strauss.

Thibaudet’s playing can be heard on the movie soundtracks of The French Dispatch, The Portrait of a Lady, Pride & Prejudice, Extremely Loud and Incredibly Close, Wakefield, and Atonement, the last of which earned an Academy Award for Best Original Score.

== Awards ==
In 2001, Thibaudet was appointed a Chevalier de l'Ordre des Arts et des Lettres and in 2012 he was promoted to the grade of Officier.

- 2010 Hollywood Bowl, Hall of Fame
- 2025 Chevalier of the Ordre de la Légion d’honneur
- 2026 Avery Fisher Prize

== Personal life ==
Thibaudet and his partner Paul have homes in Los Angeles and Paris and often travel together; Thibaudet will not accept invitations unless his partner is also invited.

Thibaudet's concert attire was designed by Vivienne Westwood; he first asked her to design an outfit for his appearance at the London Proms in 2002. The two became close friends, and their relationship persisted to the end of her life; their final collaboration was a posthumously released vinyl reissue of Thibaudet's recording of Debussy's Préludes, with design by Westwood.

== Sources ==
- Kennedy, Michael and Joyce. Oxford Concise Dictionary of Music (5th edition). Oxford: Oxford University Press, 2007. ISBN 978-0-19-920383-3.
- Pound, Jeremy. "Le Grand Bleu", BBC Music Magazine, March 2010
