= Ventsislav Yankov =

Bulgarian pianist and pedagogue (1926–2022)

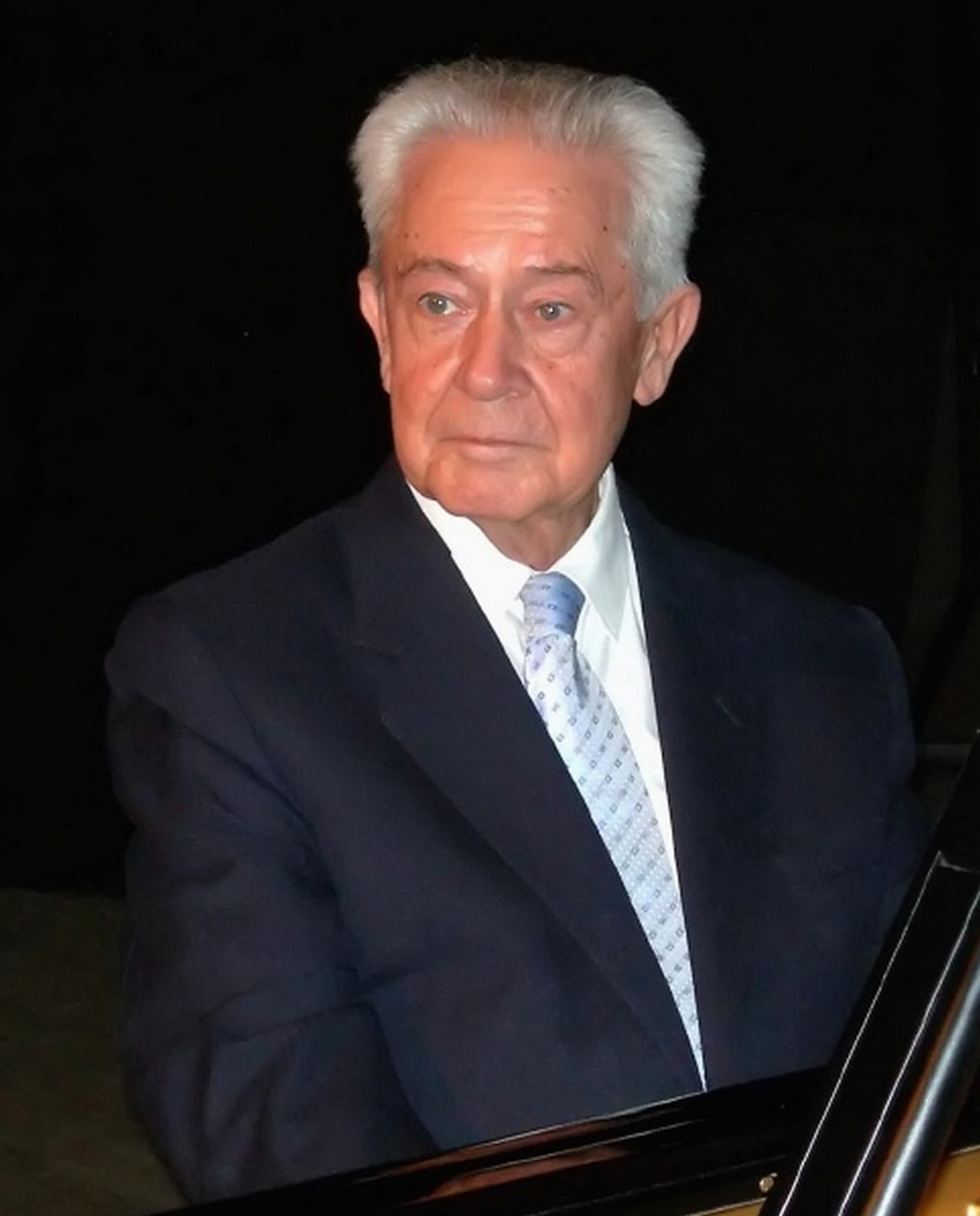
Ventsislav Yankov

Ventsislav Yankov (Bulgarian: Венцислав Янков) (24 March 1926 – 8 January 2022) was a Bulgarian pianist and pedagogue. He was born in Sofia on 24 March 1926. Trained in Berlin, he settled in France in 1946; three years later he won ex-aequo with Aldo Ciccolini the III Concours Marguerite Long-Jacques Thibaud's Grand Prize. An intercontinental concert career ensued. Yankov was a professor emeritus at the Conservatoire of Paris, where he held a professorship (1977–1991). As of 2005, he was still active as a concert pianist in France. He was a recognized interpreter of the music of Frédéric Chopin. Yankov died in Paris on 8 January 2022, at the age of 95.
