= Gérard Jarry =

French classical violinist

Gérard Jarry (Châtellerault, 6 June 1936 – Saint-Eliph, 18 January 2004) was a French classical violinist. In June 1951, he won the "Premier Grand Prix" at the Concours-Long-Thibaud, at the age of 15. In 1959, he founded the String Trio French, alongside Serge Collot and Michel Tournus.

In 1969, he joined Jean-François Paillard's Chamber Orchestra as concertmaster. He was part of the orchestra for thirty three years, during which he recorded Baroque and classical concertos, including the complete concertos of Jean-Marie Leclair, recorded in 1977 which won several major record awards; concertos by Haydn in 1973; Mozart in 1976; and Bach in 1978. In total, with Jean François Paillard, he produced more than 150 recordings (including fifty where he acted as soloist) and performed in more than 2,500 concerts on five continents.

He was a professor at the Conservatoire de Paris, and trained several generations of artists, some leading an international career.
