= Olivier Charlier =

French violinist (born 1961)

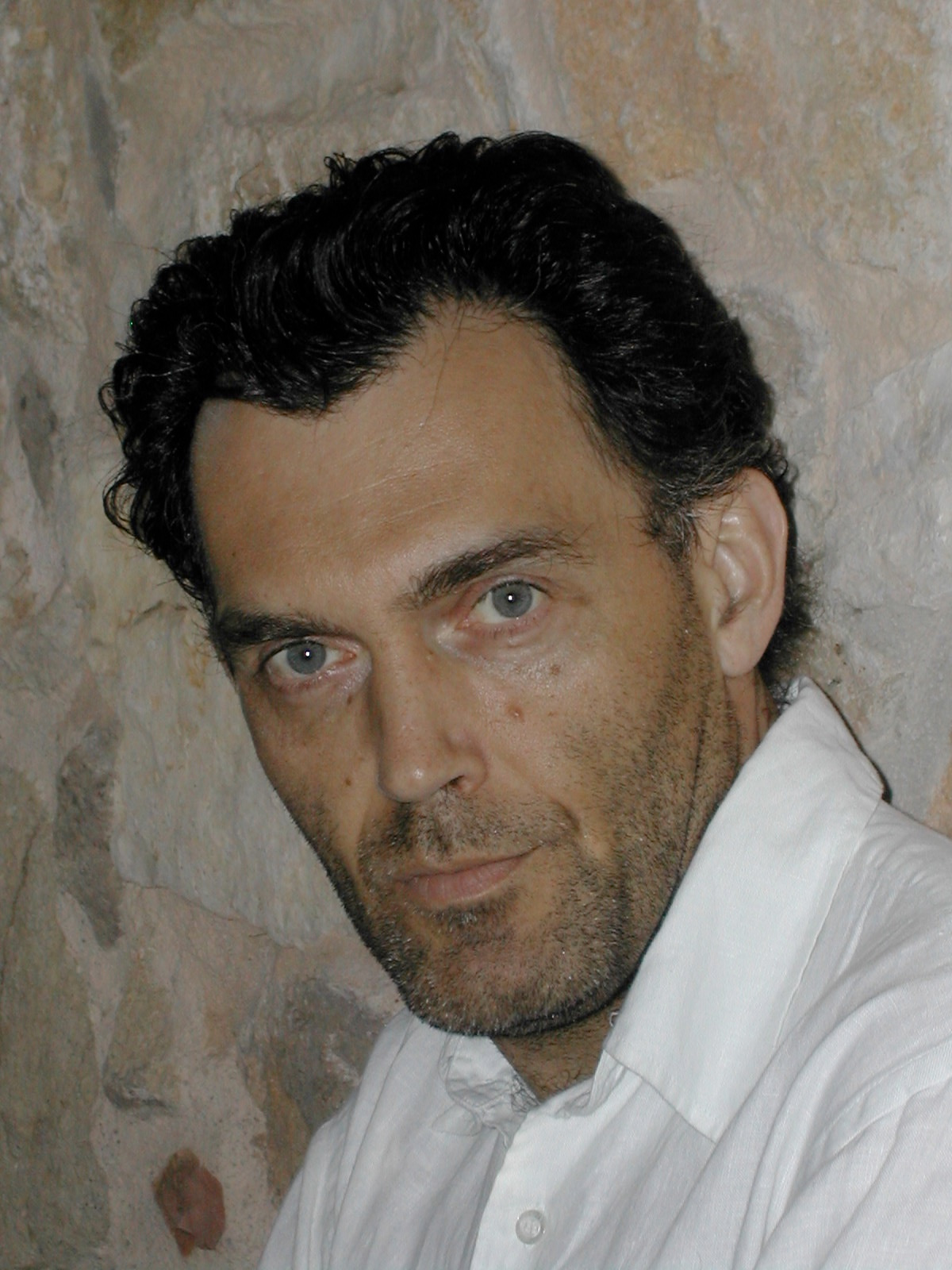

Olivier Charlier (born 17 February 1961) is a French classical violinist. He plays on a violin by Carlo Bergonzi dated 1747.

== Biography ==
Charlier was born in Albert, Somme and admitted at the age of 10 to the Conservatoire de Paris where he attracted attention from professionals in the field and earned a scholarship from Yehudi Menuhin and Henryk Szeryng in 1976.

He received top prizes at many international competitions including:1st place in Munich at 17, Montreal at 18, the International Jean Sibelius Violin Competition in Helsinki at 19, the two great French competitions Long-Thibaud-Crespin Competition (2nd grand prize) and Georges Enesco of the SACEM at 20, the International Violin Competition of Indianapolis (4th prize) at 21, and first place at the Young Concert Artists International Audition in New York in 1989 at the age of 28.

He is primarily known as a soloist.

== Bibliography ==
- André Encrevé, "Olivier Charlier", in Patrick Cabanel and André Encrevé (dir.), Dictionnaire biographique des Protestants français de 1787 à nos jours, Vol 1: A-C, Les Éditions de Paris Max Chaleil, Paris, 2015, p. 651-652 ISBN 978-2846211901
