= Conservatoire national supérieur de musique et de danse de Lyon =

National Conservatory of Music and Dance in Lyon
- CNSMDL
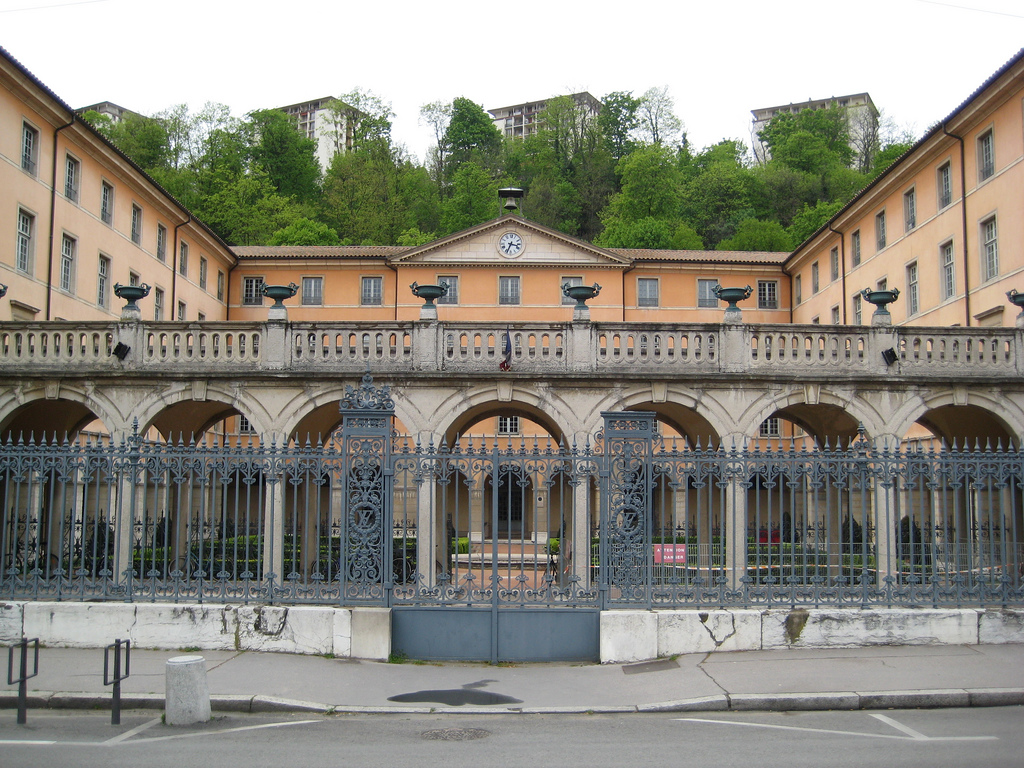
- Courtyard view from the banks

Location
- 3 Quai Chauveau; Lyon, 69009; France; 45°46′09″N 004°48′45″E

Information
- School type: conservatory
- Established: 1980
- Director: Géry Moutier
- Education system: Higher National Diploma professional musician or a dancer (DNSPM / DNSPD) master's degree worth
- Classes offered: Music; Dance
- Website: www.cnsmd-lyon.fr

The Conservatoire national supérieur de musique et de danse de Lyon (French pronunciation: [kɔ̃sɛʁvatwaʁ nɑsjɔnal sypeʁjœʁ də myzik e də dɑ̃s də ljɔ̃]; "Lyon National Superior Conservatory of Dance and Music"; CNSMDL), often simply the Conservatoire de Lyon, is a conservatory for the study of music and dance, located in Lyon, France.

It is one of the two existing Conservatoire national supérieur de musique et de danse in France, the other being the Conservatoire de Paris in Paris.

== About ==
Under the Ministry of Culture and Communication, CNSMDL is administered by a board whose chairman is appointed by the minister. The current director is Géry Moutier. He directs the conservatory with a deputy director. He is also assisted with a director of musical studies, a director of choreographic studies and a board of educational guidance. The teaching staff consists of 180 teachers, assistants and attendants. The administrative and technical team comprises 65 people. Enrollments are 500 musicians and 90 dancers. Foreign students account for 15% of the workforce.

The average season consists of nearly 300 public events that are part of the educational project, and help showcase the talent and the work of students, faculty and guest artists. Conservatory partnerships provide opportunities to expose students to the workplace.

The CNSMD Lyon is part of a network of fifty higher education institutions through the Erasmus exchange and also increases the projects with institutions outside Europe (in: Montreal, Bogota, Beirut). It has, for its projects and those of students, patronage of the SACEM, the Adams SPEDIDAM Patronage and Musical Société Générale, and for his actions at the international support of the Convention Cultures France, Region and DRAC Rhône-Alpes.

== Structure ==
The Conservatory offers an education for future professionals, selected by competitive audition. The studies are organized in two distinct cycles approved by the Bologna scheme. The first cycle (3 years) is sanctioned by the National Diploma graduate professional musician / dancer (and DNSPM DNSMD), and the second (2 years) to a degree equal to the rank of master.

== Departments ==
The faculty are grouped into ten departments:

- Department string
- Department woodwind
- Department brass
- Department keyboards
- Department voice and choral
- Department of Writing and composition
- Department early music
- Department of diploma course certificate of qualification (CA) music and dance
- Department of chamber music
- Department dance

== Annual budget ==
The annual budget of the institution is €11,048,054 and a grant from the direction of music, dance, theater and amounts to €9,632,911.

== Location ==
The CNSMD Lyon is located north of the district Old Lyon, quai Chauveau, in the 9th arrondissement of Lyon. Its historic buildings originally housed the Convent of the Sisters of St. Elizabeth (seventeenth century) and after the Revolution, became the speaker of the Veterinary School Lyon. The current layout of the premises was created by the architect Chabrol (mid-nineteenth century). In 1980, it was updated and expanded to accommodate the CNSMD Lyon.

== Directors ==
- 1980-1984: Pierre Cochereau
- 1984-2000: Gilbert Amy
- 2000-2009: Henry Fourès
- From September 2009: Géry Moutier.

== Notable alumni ==
- Mathieu Dufour
- Karen Gorden
- Adriana Kučerová
- Marc Soustrot (born 1949), conductor
- Jean-Yves Thibaudet
- Loli-Bahia Roubille (born 2002), model
