= Music of Aquitaine =

Aquitaine is a region in the southwest of France, consisting of the départements of Dordogne, Gironde, Landes, Lot-et-Garonne and Pyrénées-Atlantiques. It has a rich musical tradition dating back to before the Middle Ages and extending into the 21st century. The region is known for an annual musical event which takes place in June; during this period, nearly every village and town has a celebration of music and dance. Bordeaux is home to the Bordeaux National Orchestra and the Bordeaux National Ballet Company, both of which contribute to the Grand Théâtre de Bordeaux. The Bordeaux National Orchestra is very well known, and as of 2004 is conducted by Hans Graf.

== Pre-Medieval (before 500) ==
The earliest known composer in Aquitaine was Paulinus of Nola (353–431), a Roman Catholic bishop who was from the city of Bordeaux in Gironde.

== Medieval (500–1400) ==
=== Chant and the Abbey of Saint Martial, Limoges ===
According to Grove Music Online, in the Middle Ages the Aquitaine region played a significant role in developing a unique and important repertory of medieval music which encompossed both monophonic and polyphonic music. The region is noted for its contribution to Gallican chant with Aquitanian chant manuscripts being an important group of documents in the study of that music. Some of the earliest surviving neumatic notations of Western plainsong are from the Aquitanian chant manuscripts from the 9th century. The vast majority of these manuscripts were from the Abbey of Saint Martial, Limoges (ASML) which housed the largest collection of mediaeval music in all of France. The monk, composer, and scribe Adémar de Chabannes was an influential figure in the building of the music library at the ASML.

The Aquitaine region also contributed to the development of a combined gradual and secular antiphoner during the late 9th and early 10th centuries. The Bibliothèque nationale de France (BnF) contains several tropers (a specific type of musical manuscript) from the ASML. One of these tropers, dated to c. 930, encompasses incipits of chants intended for use at Vespers and Matins. Another document from the ASML at the BnF is an abridged monastic antiphoner dated to the late 10th century which contains partial music notation. The library and archive at the Toledo Cathedral in Spain houses the earliest known fully notated manuscript from Aquitaine; an antiphoner dated to the early 11th century.

In the early 10th century a type of unique improperia known as the Aquitaine Reproaches emerged with representative manuscripts of this type extending from 903 through 1240 in the BnF. Aquitanian chant manuscripts from the early 12th century demonstrate a unique type of florid music developed within the organum literature. These include manuscripts of 94 two-part vocal pieces; half of which were based on older melodies and text, and the other half containing newly composed music and text. Only a small number of these pieces were liturgical with the others adopting a strophic form of trope known as versus. The polyphony demonstrated in these Aquitanian manuscripts is credited as a precursor to further polyphonic development in the Codex Calixtinus from the later part of the 12th century.

=== Troubadour and music of court and church patronage ===
William IX, Duke of Aquitaine (1071-1126) is considered the earliest known troubadour. Of his 11 surviving poems, only one survives with music: Pos de chantar m’es pres talens. His grandson was the English ruler Richard the Lionheart who also had a reputation as a singer and poet, and spent most of his life not in England but in Aquitaine. Richard's song Ja nus hons pris survives with music. Richard's mother and William's daughter, Eleanor of Aquitaine (1122–1204), financially supported several troubadours, including Bernart de Ventadorn.

The Archdiocese of Bordeaux became the musical center of the region in the mid-14th century. The nephew of Archbishop Amanieu de La Mothe, Pierre de la Mothe, became a central figure in the musical life of the area in the latter half of the 14th century.

== Renaissance (1400–1600) ==
The choir at the Bordeaux Cathedral was founded in 1463, and in 1531 a new organ loft was built there. Other notable choirs were established at the Église Saint-Pierre de Bordeaux in 1481, and soon after at the Basilica of Saint Severinus, Bordeaux. These churches had influential music schools attached to the choirs that were an important early provider of music education in the region. Guillaume Pietrequin (fl. 1502 – c. 1528) was appointed choirmaster at the Église Saint-Pierre in 1517.

Composer Clément Janequin (c. 1485 – 1558) spent twenty-five years living and working in Bordeaux. The Bordeaux Cathedral, Aquitanian composers he associated with included Eustorg de Beaulieu (1495– 1552) and Lancelot du Fau.

== Baroque (1600–1750) ==
A group of local violinists founded the orchestra Frayrie de Monsieur Saint Genès in Bordeaux on 5 February 1621. From 1623 through 1635 the organ builder Valéran de Héman lived in Bordeaux; during which time he restored the organs at most of the major churches in the city. Pierre Trichet (1587 - 1644) was a lawyer for the Parliament of Bordeaux who wrote an important treatise on musical instruments, Traité des instruments de musique (c. 1640). When King Louis XIV visited Aquitaine, his arrival in Bordeaux on 5 October 1650 was marked by a performance of a Te Deum mass at the Bordeaux Cathedral. This same mass was repeated at the Cathedral with three combined choirs on 27 March 1666 in honor of the death of Anne of Austria. In 1657 René Ouvrard was appointed choirmaster at the Bordeaux Cathedral.

Nicolas Jacquet, the brother of Élisabeth Jacquet de La Guerre, was an organist and music teacher of note in Bordeaux in the late 17th century. In 1707 a group of amateur musicians founded the community orchestra Académie des Lyriques in Bordeaux. Among them was Abbe Jules Bellet (1672-1752). In 1712 the Académie nationale des sciences, belles-lettres et arts de Bordeaux was established by royal decree of Louis XIV. Composer and music historian Sarrau de Boynet (1685–1772) was an early director of this institution. It played in instrumental role in supporting the music, art, science, and other academic interests in the region until it dissolved in 1976.

Composer Charles Levens (1689–1764) was choirmaster at the Bordeaux Cathedral and produced a numbered of well regarded motets and masses. When the Infante of Spain visited in 1749 a cantatille he composed was played in her honor. The organ builder Dom Bédos de Celles (1709–1779) resided in Bordeaux and spent twenty years creating the organ at the Church of the Holy Cross, Bordeaux. In 1728 the composer Pierre Gaviniès was born in Bordeaux, but spent most his life as a musician in Paris.

== Classical (1750–1820) ==
The choir school at the Basilica of Saint Severinus was dissolved in 1776, and the choir school at the Bordeaux Cathedral ended in 1792. Several musical societies were established in Bordeaux during the classical period; including the Musée Littéraire (1783) and the Lycée (1787). The Musée Littéraire was succeeded by the Société Philomathique in 1808.

In 1761 the German composer, conductor, and violinist Franz Ignaz Beck moved to Bordeaux in the service of Louis François Armand de Vignerot du Plessis, 3rd Duke of Richelieu. When the newly built Grand Théâtre de Bordeaux was inaugurated on 17 April 1780, Beck was the theatre's first music director; leading the theatre's orchestra in performances of operas and symphonies among other types of works.

== Romantic (1800–1910) ==
The Grand Théâtre de Bordeaux was a significant opera house for French opera during the Romantic period. The house staged all of the great 19th century French operas and also underwent significant renovations to both its architecture and decoration during this period. Franz Litz visited Bordeaux in January 1826 and performed six recitals on a piano made by Sébastien Érard.

In 1817 Pierre Galin, developer of Galin-Paris-Chevé system, began teaching in Bordeaux. He died in 1821, the year the Conservatoire de Bordeaux was first conceived by France's Ministry of Culture. While proposed in 1821, the conservatory languished in planning stages and did not come into reality until many years later. In 1839 organ builders Aristide Cavaillé-Coll and Charles S. Barker restored the organ at the Bordeaux Cathedral.

In 1843 Louis Charles Lazare Costard de Mézeray (1806-1887) founded his own private conservatory in Bordeaux and that same year also established an orchestra, the Société Sainte Cécile (SSC). Mézeray's conservatory ultimately merged into the state run conservatory that had never truly gotten off the ground, and became the core program of what the government funded school initially built its foundation on. Henri Gobert led the Conservatoire de Bordeaux from 1883-1891; followed by Gustave Leloug from 1891-1896. The conservatory underwent significant improvement and growth under the leadership of Jules Pennequin from 1896 through 1914.

This SSC orchestra existed for nearly a hundred years; only ending after merging with another ensemble. It established a music composition prize which was won by Camille Saint-Saëns for his Symphony in F major in 1857. Saint-Saëns notably made his conducting debut leading the SSC in this work. He won this prize a second time for his Spartacus Overture in 1863.

The Samazeuilh brothers, Fernand Samazeuilh (1845-1921) and Joseph Samazeuilh (1851-1936), had an influential salon in Bordeaux; attracting musicians like Hector Berlioz and Richard Wagner. Fernand's son was the composer Gustave Samazeuilh (1877-1968).

Prominent musicians in Bordeaux that were born in the Romantic period included violinist/conductors Charles Lamoureux (1834–1899) and Édouard Colonne (1838–1910); flautist/conductor Paul Taffanel (1844–1908); violinist Jacques Thibaud (1880-1953); composer Jean Roger-Ducasse (1873–1954), 19 July 1954); and organist/composers Charles Tournemire (1870–1939), Ermend Bonnal (1880–1944), and Joseph Bonnet (1884–1944). Musicians from other parts of Aquitaine of note included bass Marcel Junca (1818-1878) and soprano Emma Fursch-Madi (1847–1894).

== 20th and 21st centuries ==
Composer Henry Barraud was born in Bordeaux in 1900, followed by the composer Henri Sauguet in 1901. In 1920 the Théâtre Fémina (Bordeaux) opened to the public; a venue which operated as a cinema but transformed into a concert hall and venue for operettas, plays, and musicals in 1977 and has remained active in that capacity as of 2026. René Chauvet and Georges Mauret-Lafage led the Grand Théâtre de Bordeaux from 1921 to 1939 in a period considered a peak achievement era for the theatre. Subsequent directors included Roger Lalande, Gérard Boireau, and Alain Lombard.

The orchestra Société de Musique de Chambre be Bordeaux was founded by Henri Bordes in 1926. In 1932 the Bordeaux Conservatory's director, Gaston Poulet, established a faculty orchestra called the Association des Professeurs du Conservatoire (Association of Professors of the Conservatoire). This group merged with the longstanding Société Sainte-Cécile orchestra in 1940 to create the Société des Concerts du Conservatoire with Poulet as its music director.

After World War II, Georges Carrère succeeded Poulet as conductor and the ensemble was renamed the Orchestre Philharmonique de Bordeaux. Ultimately after a few more names, the orchestra settled on its present name, the Orchestre National Bordeaux Aquitaine. Music directors of the orchestra include Jacques Pernoo (1963–1972), Roberto Benzi (1973–1987), Alain Lombard (1988–1995), John Neschling (1996–1998), Hans Graf (1998–2004), Christian Lauba (2004–2006), Kwamé Ryan (2007–2013), Paul Daniel (2013–2023), and Joseph Swensen (2024–present). Formerly active at the Grand Théâtre de Bordeaux, the orchestra's current home venue is the Auditorium de Bordeaux which opened in 2013.

In 1950 Jacques Chaban-Delmas established an annual music festival in Bordeaux. The Festival Sigma was a major contemporary music festival held annually every October in Bordeaux from 1965 through 1996. In 1998 France's ministry of culture established the Rock School Barbey at the Théâtre Barbey in Bordeaux; an organization which operates as a school of contemporary music, a record label, and a venue for concerts. In 2005 the Casino de Bordeaux opened which in addition to being a venue for gambling also has concerts and a resident 40 player orchestra. In 2018 the Arkéa Arena opened in Bordeaux and is one of the city's venues for concert events.

Other music institutions in the region include the Scene Nationale de Bayonne et du Sud Aquitaine, which offers performances and classes.

The folk music of Aquitaine is based on instruments like the hurdy-gurdy, boha, flute, accordion, caremèra and violin. Traditional players include Alexis Capes, Julien Dejean, Mivielle, Jean Nadau, Lucien Martin, René Cabanac and Pierre Saint-Louber.
