= Sophie Teboul =

French pianist

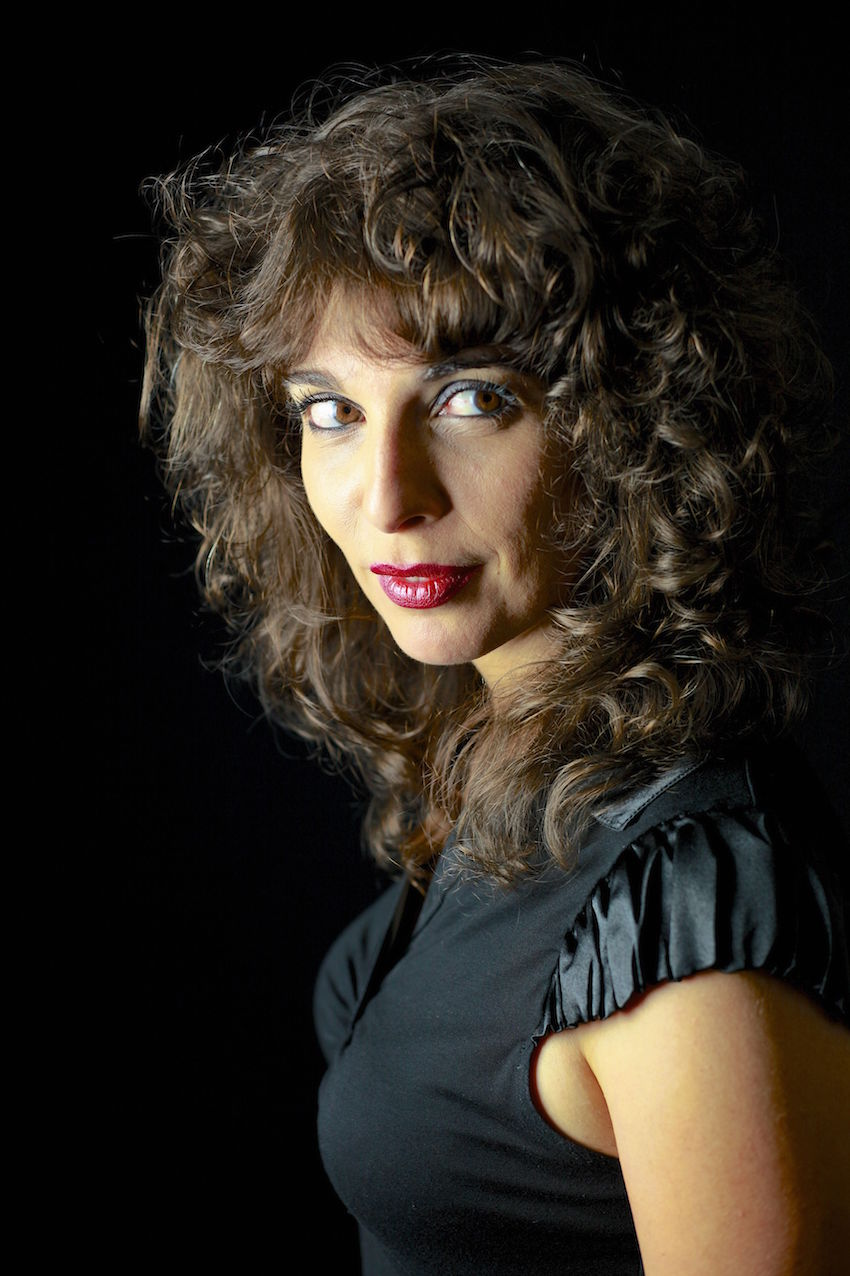
- Sophie Teboul in 2014
- Born: 6 January 1976 (age 50); Nice, France
- Education: Conservatory of Nice
- Employer: Conservatoire de Bordeaux
- Known for: Chamber music

Sophie Teboul (born 6 January 1976) is a French classical pianist.

== Training ==
Born in Nice (Alpes-Maritimes), Teboul began studying piano at the Conservatory of Nice and then at the age of 14 joined the conservatoire de Paris in Jacques Rouvier's class for piano and Christian Ivaldi's one for chamber music. She obtained a first prize in piano and two first prizes in chamber music as well as a national diploma in higher music studies.

There, she pursued a development cycle and worked with Dmitri Bashkirov, Christian Zacharias and Maria Curcio.

She won the Radio France competition at the age of 14, as well as the international piano competitions of Vercelli (Italy) and Alexandro Casagrande at Terni (Italy).

== Career ==
=== Teaching ===
Since 2001, she has been teaching piano at the Conservatoire de Bordeaux and devotes herself essentially to chamber music.

=== Instrumentist ===
She plays regularly as a soloist under the baton of Hans Graf, Jean-Jacques Kantorow, Philippe Bender, in Europe and Japan. She is invited alongside Laurent Korcia, Renaud Capuçon, Jean-Jacques Kantorow, Tasso Adamopoulos in Asia, Russia, and participates in the chamber music seasons of the Opéra national de Bordeaux

She is invited to festivals in Europe as in Montepulciano (Hans Werner Henze), as well as in Asia (Hong Kong, Beijing, Wuhan, Tokyo, Kyoto), the USA (New York, San Francisco) etc.

At the same time, she is a chamber musician, performing with Renaud Capuçon, Laurent Korcia, Marielle Nordmann, Patrice Fontanarosa and the Bordeaux quartet (Stéphane Rougier, Cécile Rouvière, Tasso Adamopoulos and Étienne Péclard) with whom she will tour Russia in the framework of the 2010 France-Russia year with the Bordeaux delegation in the presence of Alain Juppé.

Dedicatee in 2012 of Snekkar de Feu for violin, piano and narrator on a text by Michel Onfray and music by Pierre Thilloy, she participated in the premiere of the work at the 37th Cantiere Internazionale d’Arte di Montepulciano.

In addition, Teboul plays with the London Tango Quintet with Juan José Mosalini as well as with the "Meshouge Klezmer Band" and has recorded several CDs:

- My Beloved Composers, works by Gabriel Fauré and Isaac Albeniz, 1999, oki - USA, EAN 4-00020-696-7561;
- Au bonheur des Dames (music of the Roaring Twenties), September 2010, ASIN B0043U2YZ2 ;
- Musique Klezmer with the "Meshouge Klezmer Band", 2010.

For several years, she has performed in concerts of the Opéra national de Bordeaux in registers as different as classical music, contemporary music, tango or Klezmer music; for example, in 2007 (classical and contemporary music works) in 2009 (concert Tango) in 2011 (works by Astor Piazzolla) in 2013 (works by Bruckner and Klezmer music) in 2014 (classical music pieces).
