= Christian Lauba =

French musician

- Born: 26 July 1952 (age 74); Sfax, Tunisia
- Other name: Jean Matitia
- Education: Université de Bordeaux, Conservatoire de Bordeaux
- Occupation: Composer of contemporary classical music
- Years active: 1980–present
- Known for: Compositions for saxophone

Christian Lauba (born 26 July 1952) is a Tunisian-born French composer and teacher, especially noted for his compositions for saxophone. His compositions often incorporate the music of his native North Africa as well as Japanese influences. He sometimes composes under the name of Jean Matitia, particularly for jazz and rag music.

== Biography ==
Lauba was born in Sfax, Tunisia. His family later settled in Bordeaux, France, where he studied languages at the University of Bordeaux and music at the Conservatory of Bordeaux with composer Michel Fusté-Lambezat. Early in his compositional career, he also worked with saxophonist Jean-Marie Londeix. In 1993, he was appointed professor of analysis at the Conservatory. It was here that he composed pieces that had extended techniques for the saxophone including slap tonguing, circular breathing, multiphonics, and the altissimo register. He has also composed literature for other solo instruments as well as ensembles.

He has given master classes in composition and lectured at many universities including Bowling-Green in Ohio, Winnipeg in Canada, and the University of Maryland as well as at several European conservatories including those of Milan, Madrid, Lisbon (Conservatório Nacional de Lisboa), and Amsterdam. He chaired the jury of the Gaudeamus International Composers Award in 1996.

From 2004 to 2007, Lauba was artistic director of the Orchestre National Bordeaux Aquitaine and from 2004 to 2006, also its music director.

In the 2007/2008 season he was composer in residence with the Orchestre symphonique de Mulhouse, where his New York Concerto (a triple concerto for saxophone, cello and piano) received its world premiere.

== Awards and commissions ==
Lauba won First Prize for composition in the class of Michel Fuste-Lambezat and the Medal of Honor of the City of Bordeaux. In 1994 he won first prize in the Berlin International Composition Competition (Institut für Neue Musik), and his Neuf études pour saxophones (Nine études for saxophones), commissioned by Jean-Marie Londeix and composed between 1992 and 1994, won the SACEM prize in composition. He has received commissions both from the French state and from a variety of contemporary classical music ensembles (Diotima Quartet, Cuarteto Casals, Percussion de Strasbourg, Belcea Quartet, Ensemble Court-Circuit, Ictus Ensemble, and the Netherlands Wind Ensemble) as well as from larger orchestras, including the Orchestre Symphonique de Mulhouse, Orchestre Poitou-Charentes, Orchestre Régional de Cannes, Orchestre Colonne, MDR Symphony Orchestra, Orchestre National Bordeaux Aquitaine, and the Opéra National de Bordeaux.

== Compositions ==
- Adria for 2 alto saxophones (1985)
- Blue Rai for solo cello (5 studies for contemporary solo)
- Blue Stream for piano (2000)
- Brasil sem fim for piano (1990)
- The Devil's Rag (by his alias Jean Matitia)
- Dies Irae for soprano saxophone and organ (1990)
- Dream in A Bar for baritone saxophone and percussion
- Erg for wind ensemble, harp, piano, and bass (1990)
- Hard for tenor saxophone solo (1988)
- Hoggar for orchestra (1995)
- Kwintus for violin (2000)
- The Lost Forest for ensemble of 12 saxophones (1983)
- Massaï for alto saxophone and bass clarinet or tenor saxophone (2010)
- Morphing for string quartet (1999)
- Neuf études pour saxophone (Nine études for saxophone)(1996)
1. Balafon
2. Savane
3. Sanza
4. Jungle
5. Tadj
6. Gyn
7. Vir
8. Ars
9. Bat
- Reflets for saxophone ensemble
- "Stan" (a tribute to Stan Getz) for baritone saxophone and synthesizer (2001)
- Steady Study on the Boogie (1995)
- Sud for saxophone and piano

== Recordings ==
- Hard (performed by Richard Ducros), CD Label: Adria, 2010
- Au Bonheur des Dames – Musiques de Rudy Wiedoeft et Jean Matitia (performed by Richard Ducros, Sophie Teboul, Christian Lauba, and Stéphane Rougier), CD Label: Richard Ducros, 2010
- Neuf études pour saxophones, cahier 1: Balfon/Savane/Sanza/Jungle (performed by Randall Hall), The Passage Between, CD Label: Innova Records, 2009
- Christian Lauba: Neuf études pour saxophones (performed by Joël Versavaud), CD Label: Maguelone, 2008
- Lauba: Morphing (live performances of Lauba's works by Cuarteto Casals, Richard Ducros, Benjamin Kreith, and Ivo Janssen), CD Label: Accord/Universal Music, 2000
- Christian Lauba: Ôsmos (performed by Marie Bernadette Charrier, Christophe Havel, Richard Rimbert, Patrice Goudin, Joël Versavaud, et al.), CD Label: Alba Musica, 1995

Cultural offices
Preceded by Hans Graf	Music Director, Orchestre National Bordeaux Aquitaine; 2004–2006	Succeeded by Kwamé Ryan
