= Louis Rosoor =

French cellist (1883 - 1969)

Louis Rosoor (September 1883 – March 1969) was a French cellist, performer and teacher.

== Biography ==
Louis Rosoor was born in Tourcoing (in northern France), 1 September 1883. He studied cello first with Émile Dienne at the conservatory of Lille and then with Jules Loeb at the conservatory of Paris. (Note: pp. 168–169.)

He started being solo violoncello at the Concerts Hasselmans then, in 1909, succeeded to the famous cellist André Hekking as cello professor in the conservatory of Bordeaux, position that he kept until 1950. (Note: p. 299.) He was also teaching Chamber music. (Note: p. 203.) He has been member of juries in the conservatories of Paris and Toulouse.

He played in various chamber music ensembles: the Marsick Quartet (with whom he had a three-month tour in Cairo and around in 1909), the Gaspard Quartet (1910–1920), the Thibaud – Arthur – Rosoor Trio (1909–1933), the Quartet of Bordeaux (1936–?) (Note: p. 204) as well as with Francis Planté, in duo, trio with Noëla Cousin playing violin and in Piano quartet with also Marie-Valentine Rosoor, his wife, playing viola (1921–1927).

He gave quite a number of concerts, most in Bordeaux and around (e.g. in Arcachon (Note: where he had, with Claude Debussy, a play-through of his Sonata for cello (see pp. 52–53 as well as Moray Welsh, The Pierrot Puzzle).) from 1910 to 1926) including in northern Spain, but also a few in Paris. He was one of the earliest performers of pieces like Debussy's sonata, Fauré's second sonata or Vincent d'Indy's trio, all rehearsed with their composers.

He was close to, or played with, other composers like Halina Krzyżanowska, Maurice Ravel, Jean Roger-Ducasse, Guy Ropartz, Albert Roussel, Florent Schmitt or Charles Tournemire and performers like Lucien Capet, Claire Croiza, Paule Dencausse, Paul Loyonnet, Gaston Poulet or Blanche Selva. Julien Fernand Vaubourgoin dedicated his Sonata for piano and cello to him. (Note: p. 234.)

He played a Testore cello at the beginning of his career and, later, a Gigli; occasionally a Tecchler.

He was one of Le Violoncelle magazine's contributors since its first edition in March 1922.

He recorded in 1933 for the Gramophone Company France (K-6960 et K-7027). His interpretations were broadcast on the "T.S.F." radio (1933–1938).

He was the author of a transcription of seven Bach Inventions called "Sept pièces pour deux violoncelles concertants ou pour violon et violoncelle – sans accompagnement de piano", still edited today.

He transcribed the Mozart Sonata for bassoon and cello (K.292/196c) into a cello concerto.

Main founder of the Society of Chamber Music of Bordeaux, he remained, as well as his wife Marie-Valentine, Technical Adviser for a long time. Louis Rosoor has been an outstanding actor in the musical activity of Bordeaux in the first half of the 20th century.
