= Paule Carrère-Dencausse =

French pianist (1891–1969)

Paule Carrère-Dencausse (22 December 1891 – 21 October 1967) was a French pianist, concertist and teacher.

== Biography ==
Dencausse studied music at the conservatoire de Bordeaux: First Prize for solfège, piano in 1906, chamber music in 1908, harmony in 1910 as well as counterpoint and fugue in 1912. She won the Musica International Piano Competition in 1912.

She later studied musical composition with Julien Fernand Vaubourgoin who will dedicate his scherzo in C minor to her and won a silver medal in the music composition competition (Romance sans paroles).

First accompanying a singing class at the Bordeaux Conservatory, she was appointed professor of solfeggio in 1920 and professor of piano in 1931, a position she held until 1963. She was also a professor at the Marguerite Long Academy whose regional center she created in Bordeaux.

She married violinist Georges Carrère in 1925 and therefore performed under the name of Paule Carrère-Dencausse. She was then, with Eugène Feillou (violist) and Henri Barouk (cellist), also a member of the Georges Carrère Quartet.

Great names like Cortot, Fauré, Planté, Roger-Ducasse, Roussel and Saint-Saëns appreciated her talent. Louis Beydts dedicated his first work for piano to her. Her qualities as an accompanist were also recognized: she was the reference accompanist for Louis Rosoor and accompanied (Note: p. 204.) Charles Panzéra in 1931 in Bordeaux.

She trained a large number of students, many of whom would become virtuosos, composers or teachers.

=== Family ===
She is the mother-in-law of the historian Hélène Carrère d'Encausse and the grandmother of the writer and director Emmanuel Carrère, the lawyer Nathalie Carrère and the doctor and journalist Marina Carrère d'Encausse.

== Sources ==
- A. Edmond Cardoze, Musique et musiciens en Aquitaine, Aubéron, 1992
