= Étienne Péclard =

French cellist (born 1946)

Étienne Péclard (born 21 December 1946 in les Deux-Sèvres) is a contemporary French cellist.

== Biography ==
Péclard studied at the Conservatoire de Paris with André Navarra, Joseph Calvet, Jacques Février and Jean Hubeau. There he obtained the First prizes of cello and chamber music.

The winner of the international competitions of Vienna, Munich and Barcelona, from 1977 to 1990, Péclard was solo cellist of the Orchestre philharmonique de Radio France, then of the Orchestre de Paris, under the direction of Daniel Barenboim. Named solo cellist of the Orchestre National Bordeaux Aquitaine (ONBA) in 1990, he taught at the Conservatoire de Bordeaux and joined Roland Daugareil and Tasso Adamopoulos in order to form the Sartory Trio. He is also a member of the String quartet of the ONBA.

With the ONBA, directed by Alain Lombard, Étienne Péclard recorded the double concerto by Johannes Brahms, the Symphonie-concerto, Op. 125 by Sergueï Prokofiev and Schelomo by Ernest Bloch; in 1999, he obtained a great success with his interpretation of Tout un monde lointain... by Henri Dutilleux, directed by Hans Graf. In November 2003, he performed the concerto by Saint-Saëns under the baton of his friend Frédéric Lodéon. In June 2005 he met again his accomplice Tasso Adamopoulos for Don Quichotte, Symphonic poem by Richard Strauss, with the ONBA directed by Armin Jordan.
