= Alain Lombard =

French conductor (born 1940)

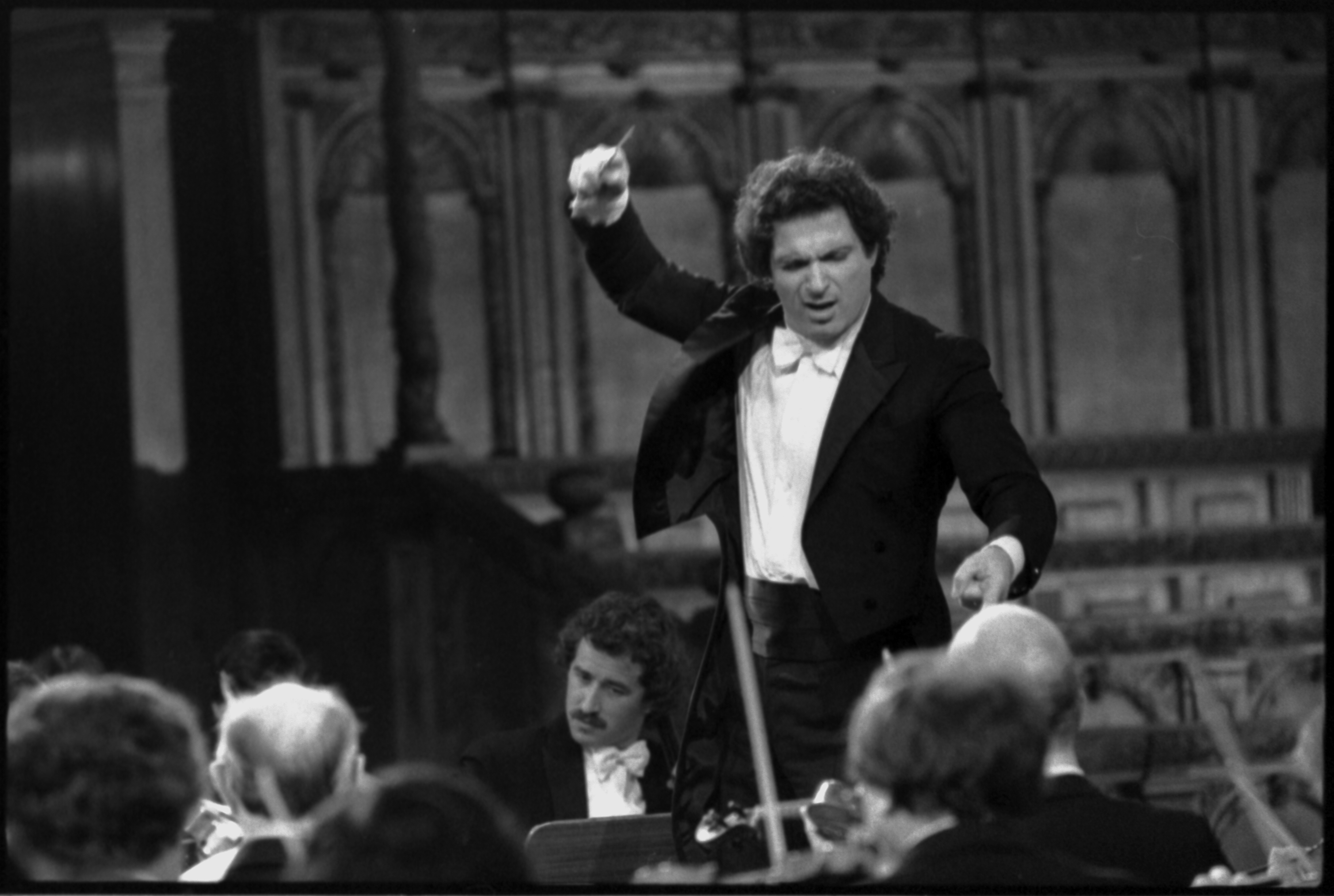
- Alain Lombard by Claude Truong-Ngoc (1980)
- Occupation: conductor

Alain Lombard (born 4 October 1940, Paris) is a French conductor.

== Career ==
Lombard attended the Conservatoire de Paris, where his studied violin with Line Talleul and conducting with Gaston Poulet. He subsequently secured an appointment at the Opéra National de Lyon in 1961, and later became principal conductor from 1961 to 1965. He was a gold medal winner at the Dimitri Mitropoulos Competition in 1966. He made his debut at the Metropolitan Opera in 1967, conducting Gounod's Faust. He was an assistant conductor of the New York Philharmonic during the music directorship of Leonard Bernstein, and traveled with the orchestra as Associate Tour Conductor. In the US, he was music director of the Greater Miami Philharmonic Orchestra from 1967 to 1975.

Lombard assisted in the formation of the Opéra du Rhin (later the Opéra national du Rhin) in 1972. He was music director of the Opéra du Rhin from 1974 to 1980. With the Opéra du Rhin, he conducted commercial recordings of Gounod's Faust, Puccini's Turandot and Mozart's Così fan tutte. He served as music director of the Strasbourg Philharmonic Orchestra from 1972 to 1983. He also held posts with the Paris Opéra, the Opéra-Comique, the Opéra National de Bordeaux, and the Orchestre National Bordeaux Aquitaine. He was appointed director of the Grand Théâtre de Bordeaux in 1990. On 20 November 1995, Lombard was dismissed from his posts by the mayor of Bordeaux, Alain Juppé, after concerns were expressed about the organisation's finances. Lombard became principal conductor of the Orchestra della Svizzera Italiana in 1999 and served until 2005, and now holds the title of honorary conductor with the orchestra.

Lombard's other commercial recordings include Carmen, with Régine Crespin and Lakmé, with Mady Mesplé.

== Personal life ==
Lombard has been married twice. He has two children, Franca and Jessica, from his second marriage.

== See also ==
- Mozart: Così fan tutte (Alain Lombard recording)

Preceded by Alceo Galliera	Music Director, Orchestre philharmonique de Strasbourg; 1972–1983	Succeeded by Theodor Guschlbauer
Preceded by Roberto Benzi	Music Director, Orchestre National Bordeaux Aquitaine; 1988–1995	Succeeded by John Neschling
Preceded by Serge Baudo	Principal Conductor, Orchestra della Svizzera Italiana; 1999–2005	Succeeded by (post vacant)
