= Albert Le Guillard =

French composer and conductor

Albert Le Guillard (1887–1958) was a French composer and conductor.

He was born in Paris on 16 October 1887 and became a pupil at the Conservatoire there. His teachers included Émile Pessard, Maurice Emmanuel and Maurice Ravel. In 1914 he began a string quartet, but soon after enlisted to fight in World War I. The work was finished when he returned from the war.

He played second violin in the Quatuor Poulet and later headed the symphonic service of the French Radio and Television Broadcasting. Le Guillard also composed chamber music works, including an excellent Quartet, a Sonata for violin and piano as well as songs, including his Four songs Op 8 for voice and piano (La Mort des amants by Baudelaire; Pantoum négligé by Verlaine; Crépuscule pluvieux by Ephraïm Mikhaël; Chanson by André Spire).

His death was reported in the 19 February 1958 issue of Le Monde.
