= Georges Carrère =

French violinist

Georges Carrère (19 May 1897 – 31 December 1986) was a French classical violinist and head of the Conservatoire de Bordeaux and the l'Orchestre Philharmonique de Bordeaux.

== Biography ==
Born in Bordeaux by a father conductor at the Grand Théâtre de Bordeaux and a singing mother, Carrère studied music in Bordeaux where he obtained a First Prize for violin in 1912 in Joseph Gaspard's class.

He then continued his studies in Paris working with Lucien Capet, César Geloso and Édouard Nadaud, then at the Conservatoire de Paris where he studied violin in Guillaume Rémy's class and harmony in that of Émile Pessard; there he obtained a 2nd prize for violin in 1923.

He was in the infantry and then the air force during the First World War during which he was wounded and decorated (Croix de guerre). He later returned to the Conservatoire de Paris and worked with Carl Flesch and Georges Enesco from which followed a career of concertist.

When his mother died, he returned to live in Bordeaux with his father and sister and married Paule Dencausse in 1925. In 1928, he had his only child, Louis Carrère.

With his wife (pianist), Eugène Feillou (violist) and Henri Barouk (cellist), he founded the Georges Carrère Quartet who gave its inaugural concert in 1928. He was later also a member of the Bordeaux Quartet

Around 1934, he was appointed violin teacher at the Conservatoire de Bordeaux and in charge of organizing the concerts of the Bordeaux Philharmonic Orchestra. He then became inspector of studies at the Bordeaux Conservatory and then its deputy director with Gaston Poulet, to whom he succeeded on 1 July 1948 while conducting the orchestra class and the violin excellence course. He was the music director of the Bordeaux Philharmonic Orchestra from 1944 to 1963 and remained director of the conservatory until 1968.

He was a member of the jury of the Conservatoire de Paris competition and of the Long-Thibaud-Crespin Competition.

Cultural offices
Preceded by Gaston Poulet	Music Director, Orchestre Philharmonique de Bordeaux; 1945–1963	Succeeded by Jacques Pernoo
