= Charlotte Symphony Orchestra =

Orchestra in Charlotte, North Carolina

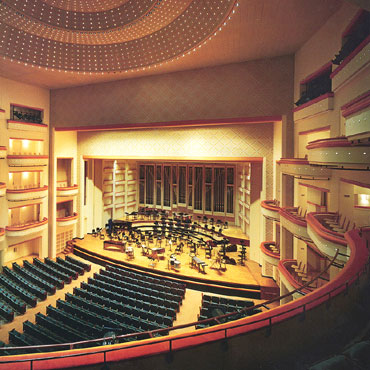
- Belk Theater, home of the Charlotte Symphony Orchestra
- Founded: 1932
- Concert hall: Belk Theater, Blumenthal Performing Arts Center
- Principal conductor: Kwamé Ryan
- Website: www.charlottesymphony.org

The Charlotte Symphony Orchestra is an American orchestra based in Charlotte, North Carolina. The orchestra's principal home is the 1,970-seat Belk Theater of the Blumenthal Performing Arts Center. The official chorus of the orchestra is the Charlotte Master Chorale. The orchestra also serves as the resident orchestra for Opera Carolina and Charlotte Ballet. The Symphony Park amphitheater at SouthPark is home to the orchestra's Summer Pops concerts. The Charlotte Symphony is the oldest continuing orchestra in the southeastern United States.

== History ==
The Spanish conductor and composer Guillermo S. de Roxlo founded the orchestra in 1932, with an initial ensemble of 15 musicians. The orchestra gave its first concert on 20 March 1932 at the Carolina Theatre, with a total ensemble of 57 musicians.

Richard Cormier was the first full-time music director of the orchestra, from 1963 to 1967. The orchestra's longest-serving music director was Leo Driehuys, from 1977 to 1993. From 2001 to 2010, Christof Perick was music director, and the orchestra released its first compact disc during Perick's tenure, in 2007, with music of Beethoven, Schubert, Mahler, and Mozart. In July 2009, the Charlotte Symphony Orchestra launched a bridge fund campaign at its “Celebrate America” concert in Charlotte's Symphony Park, with a goal of raising $5.6 million to cover projected budget gaps over a six-year period. This fund is separate from the symphony's annual operating budget of $7.6 million. As of February 2010, the CSO had raised $4.3 million toward the bridge fund goal. Following the close of his tenure, Perick had the title of conductor laureate for the 2010–2011 season.

The orchestra's most recent music director was Christopher Warren-Green, who held the post from 2010 to 2022. Upon the close of his tenure as music director, Warren-Green took the title of conductor laureate and artistic advisor.

In January 2023, Kwamé Ryan first guest-conducted the orchestra. Ryan returned for an additional guest-conducting engagement in November 2023. In December 2023, the orchestra announced the appointment of Ryan as its next music director, effective with the 2024–2025 season, with an initial contract of 4 years. In September 2026, the orchestra announced an extension of Ryan's contract as its music director through the 2031–2032 season.

== Music directors ==
- Guillermo de Roxlo (1932–1944)
- Guy Hutchins (1945–1948)
- Lamar Stringfield (1948–1949)
- James Christian Pfohl (1949–1957)
- Henry Janiec (1958–1963)
- Richard Cormier (1963–1967)
- Jacques Brourman (1967–1976)
- Leo Driehuys (1977–1993)
- Peter McCoppin (1993–2000)
- Christof Perick (2001–2010)
- Christopher Warren-Green (2010–2022)
- Kwamé Ryan (2024–present)
