= Prelude to Glory =

1950 film

- Directed by: Georges Lacombe
- Written by: Jean Bernard-Luc; Paul Andréota
- Produced by: Joseph Grohando
- Starring: Roberto Benzi; Paul Bernard; Jean Debucourt
- Cinematography: Claude Renoir
- Edited by: Henri Taverna
- Music by: Louis Beydts
- Production company: Productions Miramar
- Distributed by: Gray-Film
- Release date: 16 June 1950
- Running time: 95 minutes
- Country: France
- Language: French

Prelude to Glory (French: Prélude à la gloire) is a 1950 French drama film directed by Georges Lacombe and starring Roberto Benzi, Paul Bernard and Jean Debucourt. It was shot at the Neuilly Studios in Paris. The film's sets were designed by the art directors Eugène Delfau and Henri Morin. A British film Prelude to Fame with a very similar theme was released the same year.

== Synopsis ==
Roberto a musical child prodigy's gifts are discovered and developed by an organist. He rises to conduct a full orchestra for the first time.

== Cast ==
- Roberto Benzi as Roberto
- Paul Bernard as Victor Dumonteix
- Jean Debucourt as Maréchal
- Louise Conte as Madame Dumonteix
- Felga Lauri as Antonia
- Charles Lemontier as Le directeur du théâtre
- Jacques Sommet as Berthier
- Paul Demange as Le brocanteur
- Raymond Hermantier as L'aveugle
- Edmond Ardisson as Le speaker
- Charles Blavette as Le caissier
- Nicole Marée as Josette
- Robert Pizani as Floriot
- André Le Gall as Gabriel
- Albert Michel as Le coiffeur

== Bibliography ==
- Holoman, D. Kern. The Société Des Concerts Du Conservatoire, 1828-1967. University of California Press, 2004.
- Rège, Philippe. Encyclopedia of French Film Directors, Volume 1. Scarecrow Press, 2009.
