= Ferdinand de Craywinckel =

Ferdinand Manuel Martin Louis Barthélemy de Craywinckel (24 August 1820 – after 1888) was a Spanish-French conductor and composer. He was born in Madrid into a family of aristocratic Belgian descent and moved to Bordeaux at age 5. He studied at the Conservatoire de Bordeaux, studying composition with Bellon, who was a pupil of Anton Reicha. He was maitre de chapelle at St. Bruno, where he lived after 1825. He wrote many masses and other church works which are of high calibre. He taught music at two schools in Bordeaux. He died in Bordeaux in 1880.
