= Stéphane Rougier =

French classical violinist

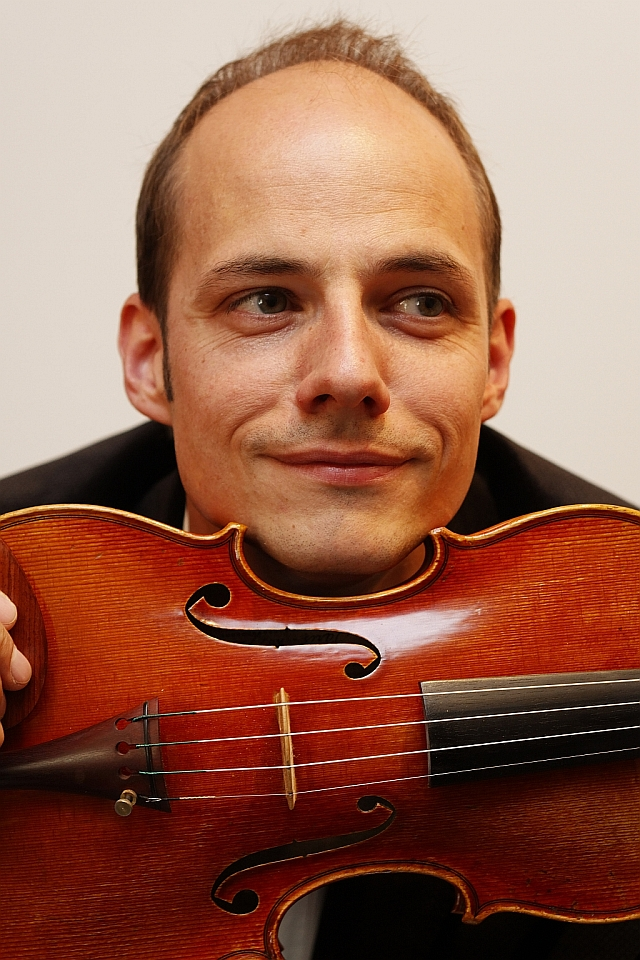
Stéphane Rougier (2009)

Stéphane Rougier is a French classical violinist .

== Biography ==
Rougier performs on the international stages in New York, San Francisco, Tokyo, Beijing, Hong Kong, London, Munich, Saint Petersburg...

He was admitted at the age of 14 to the Conservatoire de Paris, and after obtaining his violin and chamber music prizes, he went to Germany to study and quickly began his career as a chamber musician and soloist on the violin and viola.

Concertmaster at the Opéra de Bordeaux for more than ten years and performing regularly with numerous French ensembles both in France and in international concerts, he is regularly invited to renowned festivals, Bartok Festival in Hungary, Oper Klosterneuburg in Austria, French May in Hong Kong, Folle Journée de Nantes, Tokyo and Bilbao.

Dedicatee of numerous works, notably Pierre Thilloy's Le Snekkar de Feu based on texts by philosopher Michel Onfray, he attaches great importance to the realization of contemporary works with composers who are dear to him.

He joined the Bordeaux Quartet, alongside Cécile Rouvière, Tasso Adamopoulos and Étienne Péclard with whom he toured extensively in America and Asia, created film and ballet music, and devoted a large part of his time to teaching chamber music at masterclasses.

As musical director of several festivals in France and abroad, he brings together leading soloists and chamber musicians to explore and perform diverse and original musical repertoire.

He has created several ensembles of traditional music, including the Meshouge Klezmer Band, where he plays, composes, and sings folk melodies from Central Europe, as well as an Argentine Tango ensemble, which performs with Juan José Mosalini. He is also an actor in Eric Westphal's play "Mozartement Vôtre".
