= Raymond Hermantier =

French actor (1924–2005)

Raymond Hermantier (13 January 1924 – 11 February 2005) was a French actor, born in Lyon, France as Raymond Maroutian.

Raymond Hermantier aspired to become an actor from the age of 17, but his training was interrupted by World War II, during which he served in the Free French Forces until the liberation of Paris. After being decorated by General Charles de Gaulle, he resumed his acting career immediately after the end of the war. Supported by André Malraux and Albert Camus, he rose to fame at the Festival de Nîmes in France for his performance as Julius Caesar.

After several successful movies and theater performances, he was offered the Directorship of the fledgling Senegalese National Theater by the King who envisioned a world-class national theater. This culminated in the National Theater of Senegal being the first African Shakespearean to tour major European capitals in 1974. This success was followed by many successful tours of Europe over the next 13 years.

== Filmography ==
Year	Title	Role	Notes
1946	Dawn Devils	Un des commandos	
1950	Prelude to Glory	L'aveugle	
1951	Under the Sky of Paris	Mathias, l'artiste	
1954	The Big Flag	Leduc	
1981	Coup de Torchon	L'aveugle	(final film role)
