= Alexander Brailowsky =

Russian and French pianist (1896–1976)

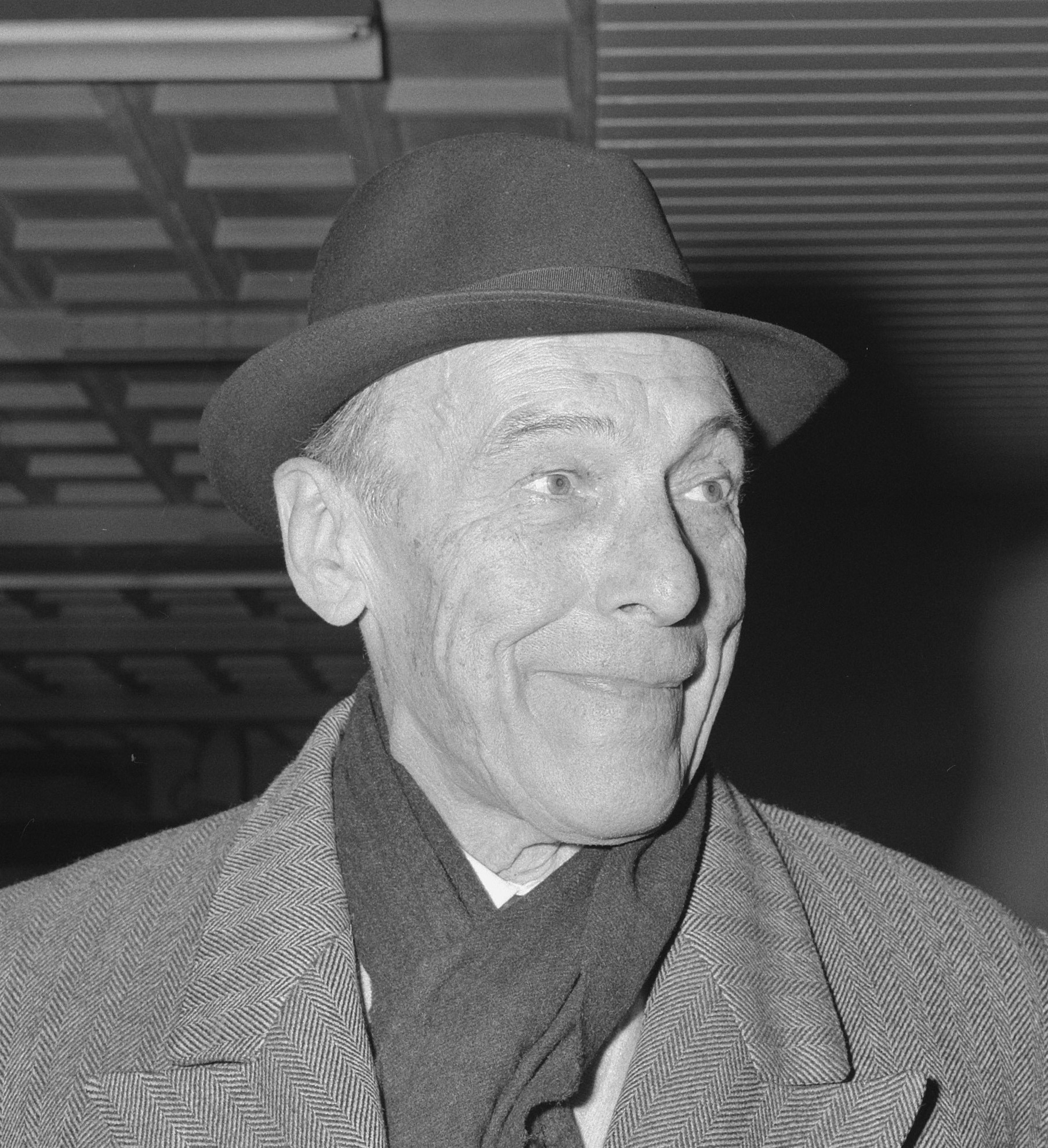
Brailowsky in 1965

Alexander Brailowsky (16 February 1896 – 25 April 1976) was a Russian and French pianist who specialised in the works of Frédéric Chopin.

== Early life ==
Brailowsky was born in Kiev, then part of the Russian Empire, to a Jewish family, and as a boy, he studied piano with his father, a professional pianist. When he was 8, he studied in Kiev with Vladimir Puchalsky, a pupil of Theodor Leschetizky. At the age of 8 he enrolled in the Kiev Conservatory, from where he graduated in 1911 with a gold medal. He studied with Leschetizky in Vienna until 1914, when he moved to Switzerland as a consequence of World War I. Subsequently, Brailowsky studied with Ferruccio Busoni in Zürich and with Francis Planté in Paris. He became a French citizen in 1926.

== Career ==
Brailowsky made his concert debut in Paris in 1919. In mid-1923, he traveled to Annecy, where he began to prepare a series of six recitals that would include all of the piano works by Frédéric Chopin. He later described the preparatory work for these recitals:

It was the work of a mathematician, rather than a pianist. [The six programs] had to be arranged in such a way that they would not be monotonous. I worked as though I was putting together a big puzzle.

In 1924, he gave a recital in Paris of the complete cycle of the works of Chopin, the first in history, using the composer's own piano for part of the recital. He then went on to present a further thirty cycles of Chopin's music in Paris, Brussels, Zurich, Mexico City, Buenos Aires and Montevideo. A highly successful world tour followed. Brailowsky's American debut was at Aeolian Hall in New York City in 1924.

He toured the United States in 1936. During a series of nineteen recitals in Buenos Aires, he never repeated a single work.

During World War II, he gave recitals for the USO. In 1960, he played the Chopin cycle again in Paris, and in Brussels in honor of the 150th anniversary of Chopin's birth.

Between 1925 and 1930 he recorded at least twenty three works for the Ampico reproducing pianos, preserving his earliest recorded legacy in this medium.

Brailowsky's first audio recordings were produced in Berlin from 1928 to 1934 and released on 78 rpm discs. In 1938, he recorded in London for His Master's Voice. Later discs were produced for RCA Victor and, in the 1960s, for CBS. Besides his huge output of Chopin, his repertoire also included Rachmaninoff, Saint-Saëns, Liszt, Debussy and others.

== Death ==
Brailowsky died at Lenox Hill Hospital in New York City at the age of 80 from complications brought on by pneumonia. He and his wife are buried at Mount Judah Cemetery in the Ridgewood neighborhood of Queens.

== Technique ==
Brailowsky said that the technique used to play Chopin's music should be "fluent, fluid, delicate, airy, and capable of great variety of color."

== Selected recordings ==
- Chopin: The Fourteen Waltzes (Columbia MS-6228)
- Chopin: The Complete Mazurkas Vol. 1 (Columbia)
- Chopin: The Complete Mazurkas Vol. 2 (Columbia)
- A Chopin Recital (Columbia MS-6569)
- Chopin Nocturnes Vol. 1
- Chopin Nocturnes Vol. 2
- Chopin Polonaises (Columbia)
- Chopin: The 24 Preludes (Columbia MS-6119)
- Chopin: Concerto No. 1 in E Minor. Op. 11
- Chopin: The Complete Etudes (RCA)
- Chopin Concerto No. 1, Liszt: Todtentanz (Columbia)
- Brailowsky Plays Liszt (RCA LM1772)
- Liszt: 15 Hungarian Rhapsodies
- Rachmaninoff Piano Concerto No. 2 (RCA)

San Francisco Symphony Orchestra Enrique Jorda, conductor

- Schumann: Etudes Symphoniques (RCA)
- Chopin: Sonata in B Minor Op. 58 (HMV DB 3701)
- Chopin: Waltzes (Volume 1) *Op. 18 *Op. 34, Nos. 1, 2 and 3 *Op. 42 *Op. 64, Nos. 1, 2 and 3 (Victor Red Seal Records M863)
