= Tasso Adamopoulos =

French musician (1944–2021)

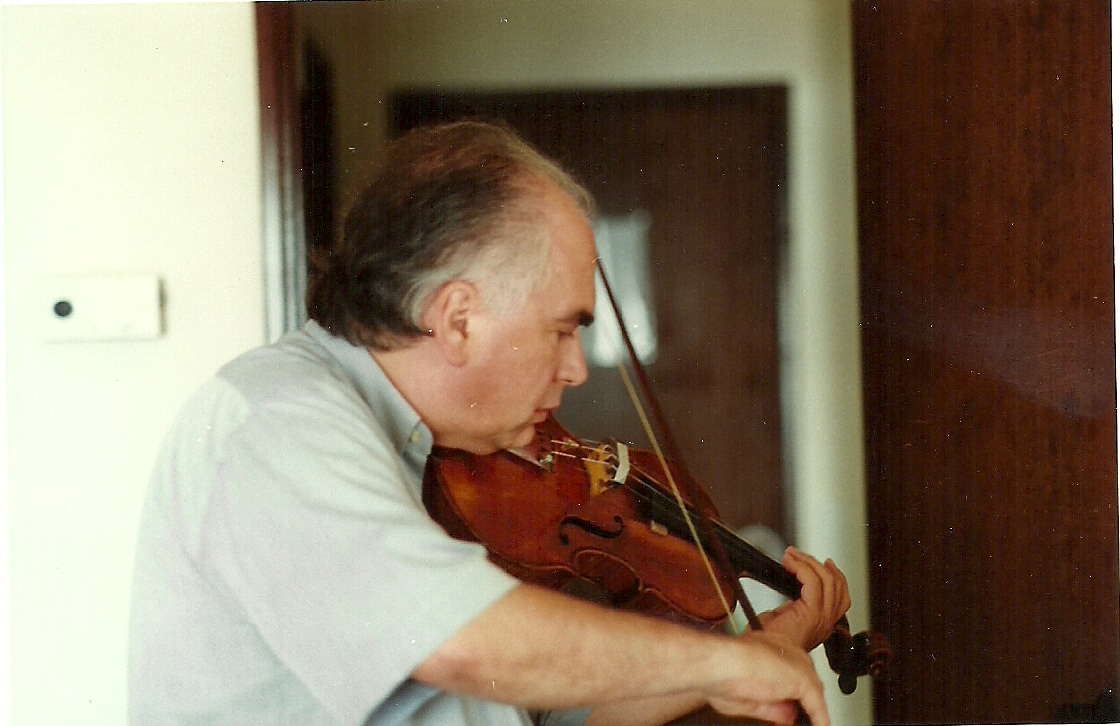

Tasso Adamopoulos (June 1944 – 3 January 2021) was a French violist of Greek origin.

== Life and career ==
Adamopoulos was born in Paris, France. After musical studies in Israel, he became a violist soloist at the Rotterdam Philharmonic Orchestra at the age of 19. Subsequently, he was successively soloist at the Gulbenkian Orchestra, the Ensemble orchestral de Paris and the Orchestre national de France from 1980 to 1990. From 1990, he was a soloist at the Orchestre National Bordeaux Aquitaine and a member of the Sartory Trio, with Roland Daugareil and Étienne Péclard.

In addition to his concert activity, Adamopoulos taught at the Conservatoire national supérieur de musique et de danse de Lyon and the Conservatoire de Bordeaux where he was responsible for the viola class of the development cycle.

He played a Landolfi viola dated 1755.

Adamopoulos, who had cancer, died on 3 January 2021, in Paris after contracting COVID-19 during the COVID-19 pandemic in France.
