= John Neschling =

Brazilian conductor

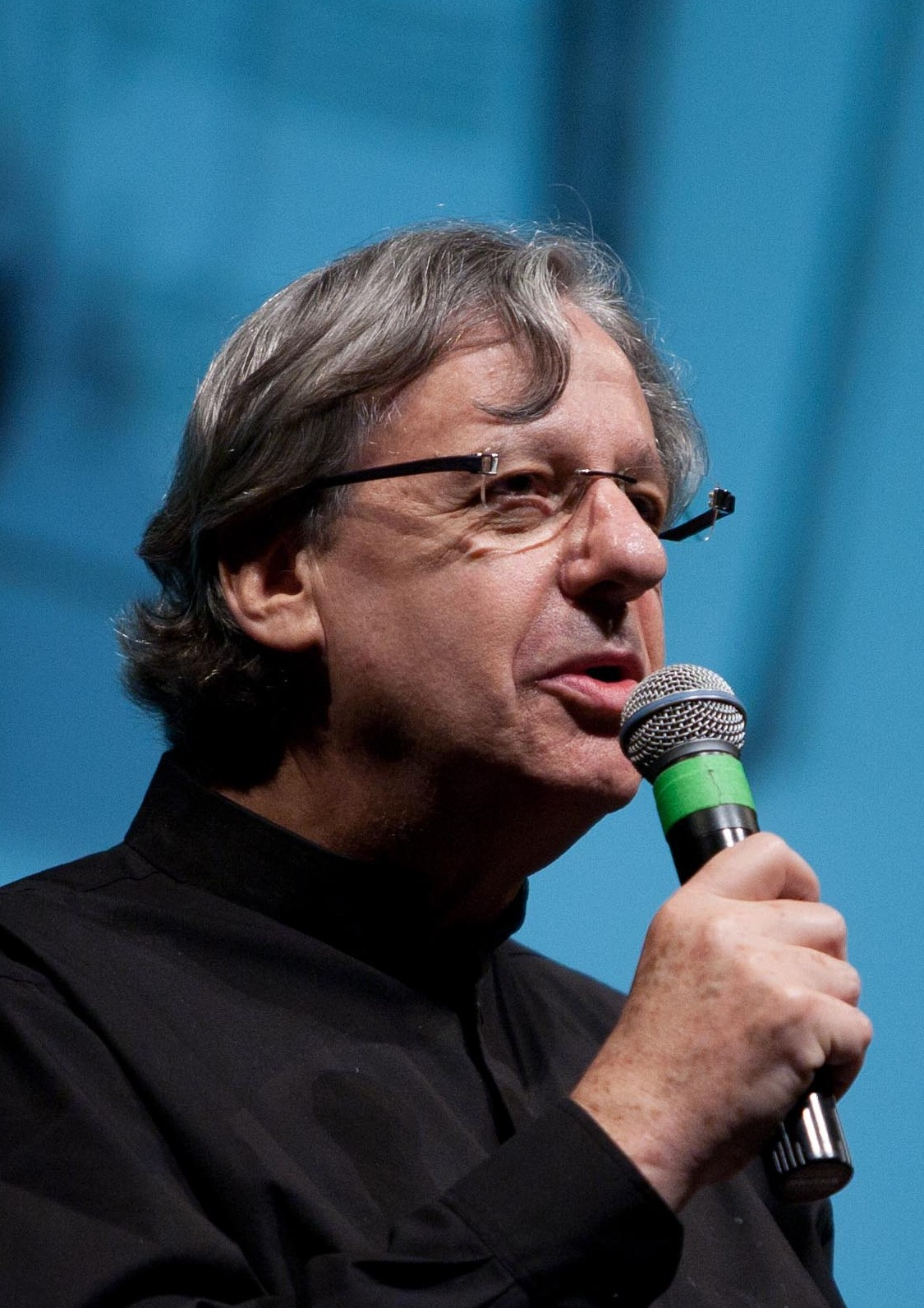
- John Neschling in 2010

Artistic Director of the Municipal Theatre of São Paulo
- In office January 2013-September 2016

Musical Director and Chief Conductor of the São Paulo State Symphony
- In office 1997-2008

Personal details
- Born: May 13, 1947 (age 79) Rio de Janeiro, Brazil
- Occupation: Conductor

John Neschling (born May 13 1947, Rio de Janeiro) is a Brazilian orchestral and operatic conductor. He was the musical director and the chief conductor of the Orquestra Sinfônica do Estado de São Paulo (São Paulo State Symphony) from 1997 to 2008.

A member of the Brazilian Academy of Music since 2003, he was appointed artistic director of the Municipal Theatre of São Paulo from January 2013 until September 2016, when he was dismissed under accusations of fiscal mismanagement.

== Early career ==
He studied conducting under Hans Swarowsky and Reinhold Schmid in Vienna and under Leonard Bernstein and Seiji Ozawa in Tanglewood. Later, he won several international conducting competitions.

== European positions ==
Neschling has been music director of Teatro Nacional de São Carlos in Lisbon, Sankt Gallen Theater in Switzerland, Teatro Massimo in Palermo and the Bordeaux Opera, and assistant conductor at the Vienna Opera. He has also been invited conductor at the London Symphony, Accademia Nazionale di Santa Cecilia in Rome, Tonhalle Orchestra in Zurich, and the BBC Symphony Orchestra in London.

He came back to Brazil in 1973 to assume the position of music director of the municipal theaters of São Paulo and Rio de Janeiro.

== São Paulo State Symphony ==
During the twelve years under his leadership, the OSESP became a first rate international orchestra, and recorded a series of CDs with Brazilian and international music, winning five Diapason d'Or and one Latin Grammy. He also organized tournées that took the orchestra to play at several concert halls around the world, including the Avery Fisher Hall in New York City and at the Musikverein in Vienna.

Under his request, the great hall of the old Júlio Prestes train station was renovated and turned into Sala São Paulo, the home of OSESP and one of the best concert halls in the world. It opened in 1999.

== Municipal Theater of the City of São Paulo ==
In 2013 Neschling was appointed as the artistic director of Theatro Municipal de São Paulo, where he served until September 2016, when he was accused of fiscal misappropriations. An investigative inquiry was started by a São Paulo state-appointed panel, but Neschling refused to answer the officials' questions, and then fled from Brazil.

== Notes ==
Cultural offices
Preceded by Alain Lombard	Music Director, Orchestre National Bordeaux Aquitaine; 1996–1998	Succeeded by Hans Graf
