= Carlo Ferdinando Landolfi =

Italian master luthier

Carlo Ferdinando Landolfi (c. 1714 – 1787) was an Italian master luthier who was active in the 18th century during the golden age of stringed instrument making.

Landolfi is considered among the half dozen finest stringed instrument makers in history, along with Stradivarius and Guarneri del Gesu and Pietro Guarneri. Instruments created centuries ago by Landolfi and his fellow Italian luthiers have not been improved upon despite modern technology and are still played by the finest violinists and violists in the great concert halls across the world.

Landolfi was born in Milan, Italy in 1714 and after an apprenticeship in Cremona, Italy, he returned to Milan in 1734, age 20, and created his workshop. As his instrument labels indicate, he worked "Contrada Santa Margherita, al Segno della Sirena," in the central metropolis of Italy's Lombardy region, at the center of the city's busy mercantile and artistic activities.

Landolfi's career continued in Milan throughout his life.

== Instruments ==
Landolfi may have been the last of the classical Italian master luthiers to use Cremonese methods of construction and of compounding varnishes.

For his finest instruments, Landolfi chose the woods with exceptional care and used superb varnishes of a particularly striking hue.

Landolfi's best instruments have similarities to the work of Guarneri del Gesu, but the Landolfis have unique characteristics reflecting constant refinement over the course of his career. For example, Landolfi developed an approach that increased the arching of the belly of each violin and viola with relation to the back. And his careful workmanship included scroll carving of a particularly graceful manner, often smaller and broader than the work of other master luthiers.

Landolfi's finest instruments are noted for their full, powerful tone, which has made them particularly prized by solo performers over the centuries.

Musicians who have owned Landolfis include Carl Flesch, the Hungarian violinist and teacher (1873–1944), who played both a Landolfi and the Brancaccio Stradivarius, and the French Jewish violist Tasso Adamopoulos (1944–2021), who owned a 1755 Landolfi viola. Marie Bérard, a French-Canadian violinist and concertmaster of the Canadian Opera Company, plays a 1767 Pietro Landolfi violin.

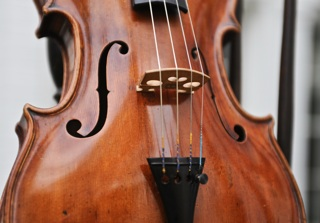
Landolfi viola, constructed 1753
