= Orchestre National Bordeaux Aquitaine =

The Orchestre National Bordeaux Aquitaine (ONBA) is a French symphony orchestra based in Bordeaux. Its principal concert venue is the Palais des sports. In addition to its regular symphony concerts, the ONBA serves as the accompanying orchestra for the Opéra National de Bordeaux and the Ballet of the Opéra National de Bordeaux. The ONBA also participates in such French music festivals as La Folle Journée (Nantes) and the Festival de La Roque-d'Anthéron. The ONBA receives financial support from the Mairie de Bordeaux, the French Ministry of Culture and the Conseil Régional d’Aquitaine (Regional Council of Aquitaine).

The ONBA has its historical roots in two instrumental ensembles based in Bordeaux. The first was the Orchestre de la Société Sainte-Cécile (Orchestra of the Saint Cecilia Society), established in 1843 by the conductor of the Grand-Théâtre de Bordeaux, Charles Mézeray. The second organisation dated from 1932, the Association des Professeurs du Conservatoire (Association of Professors of the Conservatoire), which Gaston Poulet, the director of the city's conservatory, established. In 1940, the two ensembles were essentially merged, under the direction of Poulet, to form the Société des Concerts du Conservatoire (Society of Conservatory Concerts). This ensemble worked also with the Grand Théâtre de Bordeaux.

After World War II, Poulet stood down from the Conservatoire de Bordeaux and the orchestra. The orchestra was renamed the Orchestre Philharmonique de Bordeaux, and a new leader took over both the orchestra and the conservatory, Georges Carrère, who served until 1963. In 1963, Jacques Pernoo became the orchestra's director, and the orchestra changed names again, to the Orchestre Symphonique de Bordeaux. In 1972, the orchestra acquired another new name, the Orchestre de Bordeaux Aquitaine. In the wake of the "decentralisation" policies of Marcel Landowski in French music funding, the orchestra enhanced its regional activities. During the leadership of its then-music director, Roberto Benzi, the orchestra attained a strength of 95 musicians. With the subsequent music directorship of Alain Lombard, from 1988 to 1995, the orchestra received its current name, the Orchestre National Bordeaux Aquitaine, and expanded to its present complement of around 120 musicians.

The ONBA's current music director is the American conductor Joseph Swensen, starting with the 2024-2025 season. Past principal guest conductors of the ONBA have included Yutaka Sado, from 1999 to 2004. The ONBA has made commercial recordings for such labels as Naxos Records, harmonia mundi, and Mirare.

== Music directors ==
- Gaston Poulet (1940–1944)
- Georges Carrère (1945–1963)
- Jacques Pernoo (1963–1972)
- Roberto Benzi (1973–1987)
- Alain Lombard (1988–1995)
- John Neschling (1996–1998)
- Hans Graf (1998–2004)
- Christian Lauba (2004–2006)
- Kwamé Ryan (2007–2013)
- Paul Daniel (2013–2023)
- Joseph Swensen (2024–present)
