= Joseph Swensen =

American musician (born 1960)

- In a 2026 interview
- Born: 1960 (age 65–66); Hoboken, New Jersey, United States
- Era: Contemporary

Joseph Swensen (born 1960) is an American conductor, violinist, and composer. He is winner of awards, including the Leventritt Foundation Sponsorship Award and the Avery Fisher Career Award. In 2000, Swensen was awarded an honorary doctorate from the University of St Andrews, Scotland. In 2014, he gave a TedX talk with the title “Habitats for Music and the Sound of Math” about music education and the developing brain, at the New York Institute of Technology.

== Early life and education ==
Joseph Swensen was born in 1960 in Hoboken, New Jersey, and grew up in Spring Valley, New York, Pearl River, New York and Harlem, New York City. His mother, Kikue Swensen, is Japanese-American and has played and taught piano for most of her life. His father is Norwegian-American. He studied music at the Juilliard School, where his teachers included Dorothy DeLay.

== Soloist ==
Until his thirties, Swensen's career was as a violin soloist. He performed in major cultural centres, including Carnegie Hall, Lincoln Center and the Kennedy Center, as well as in Los Angeles, San Francisco, and Boston. During his early career recording with BMG Classics, he recorded the major violin concerto repertoire with conductors such as André Previn. More recently, he has recorded as soloist with The Scottish Chamber Orchestra. He now combines a career as soloist and chamber musician with that of conducting.

== Conducting ==
Swensen currently holds the post of Conductor Emeritus of the Scottish Chamber Orchestra, where he was Principal Conductor from 1996–2005 during which time Swensen and the orchestra followed a regular concert schedule in Scotland and toured extensively in the UK, Europe, US, and the Far East. They also performed at the Mostly Mozart Festival in New York, Tanglewood and Ravinia Festivals, the BBC Proms, the Barbican, and the Concertgebouw, and recorded for Linn Records. From 2006–2011, he was music director with Malmő Opera and is guest conductor for a number of UK, European and American orchestras. Succeeding Paul Daniel, Joseph Swensen was appointed musical director of the Orchestre National Bordeaux Aquitaine (ONBA) in May 2023 as of the 2024–2025 season.

== Teaching ==
Joseph Swensen joined IU in 2013. He is appointed Starling Professor of Music (violin) at Indiana University, Jacobs School of Music in 2014. Along with his wife, Victoria Swensen, he founded Habitat4Music, a non-profit organization devoted to establishing participatory music education programmes for children in musically under-served areas worldwide. At the Habitat4Music Centre in Vermont Swensen held "Total Immersion" courses in important composers for professional musicians and conductors.

== Selected recordings ==
- Dvořák, Antonín, Joseph Swensen, Antonín Dvořák, Antonín Dvořák, and Antonín Dvořák. Violin Concerto in a Minor, Op. 53: Czech Suite, Op. 39; Nocturne for Strings in B Major, Op. 40; Waltz No. 1. Glasgow, Scotland: Linn Records, 2005. Sound recording.
- Prokofiev, Sergey, Joseph Swensen, Sergey Prokofiev, Sergey Prokofiev, and Sergey Prokofiev. Symphony No. 1 in D Major: "classical"; Violin Concerto No. 2 in G Minor; Five Melodies for Solo Violin & Strings. Glasgow: Linn Records, 2005. Sound recording.
- Sibelius, Jean, Jean Sibelius, Carl Nielsen, Joseph Swensen, and Janos Fürst. Symphony No. 1 in E Minor, Op. 39. London: BBC Music, 2006. Sound recording.
- Sibelius, Jean, Joseph Swensen, Jean Sibelius, Jean Sibelius, Jean Sibelius, Jean Sibelius, and Jean Sibelius. Pelleas and Melisande: Kuolema; Belshazzar's Feast; the Tempest: Suite No. 2; Andante Festivo. Glasgow, Scotland: Linn Records, 2003. Sound recording.
- Mendelssohn-Bartholdy, Felix, Joseph Swensen, Felix Mendelssohn-Bartholdy, Felix Mendelssohn-Bartholdy, and Felix Mendelssohn-Bartholdy. Hebrides Overture: Violin Concerto in E Minor; Symphony No. 3 in a Minor "scottish". Waterfoot, UK: Linn Records, 2004. Sound recording.
- Schubert, Franz, Joseph Swensen, and Jeffrey Kahane. Schubert. New York: RCA Victor Red Seal, 1988. Sound recording.
- MacMillan, James. Tryst. Djursholm: BIS, 1999. Sound recording.
- Bach, Johann S, Joseph Swensen, John Gibbons, Elizabeth Anderson, Johann S. Bach, Johann S. Bach, Johann S. Bach, and Johann S. Bach. Works for Violin and Harpsichord: Volume 1. S.l.: RCA Victor Red Seal, 1990. Sound recording.
- Swensen, Joseph, Johannes Brahms, Clara Schumann, Robert Schumann, and Robert Schumann. Johannes Brahms Sinfonia in B., 2012. Sound recording.
- MacMillan, James, Joseph Swensen, James MacMillan, James MacMillan, James MacMillan, and James MacMillan. Tryst: Adam's Rib; They Saw the Stone Had Been Rolled Away; Í : (a Meditation on Iona). Djursholm, Sweden: BIS, 1999. Sound recording.
- Violin Concertos of Mendelssohn & Bruch. McDuffie, Robert, Joseph Swensen, Felix Mendelssohn-Bartholdy, and Max Bruch. Cleveland, OH: Telarc, 1999. Sound recording.
- Kahane, Jeffrey, Joshua Bell, Scott Nickrenz, Carter Brey, Erika Nickrenz, Joseph Swensen, Marvis Martin, Hall Johnson, Gian C. Menotti, Johannes Brahms, Bedřich Smetana, and Ned Rorem. Live from the Spoleto Festival, 1987. Oakhurst, N.J: Musical Heritage Society, 2003. Sound recording.
- Mendelssohn-Bartholdy, Felix, Joseph Swensen, Felix Mendelssohn-Bartholdy, and Felix Mendelssohn-Bartholdy. Violin Concerto. S.l.: Linn, 2002. Sound recording.
- BBC Music, Volume 14, Number 11: Sibelius: Symphony no. 1 / Nielsen: Symphony no. 1 (as Conductor), 2006-2007

== Selected compositions ==
- Seven Last Words for chamber ensemble (1996)
- Mantram for string orchestra and percussion (1998)
- Latif for solo cello with chamber ensemble (1999)
- Shizue for solo shakuhachi and orchestra (2001)
- Sinfonia in B (original 1854 version of Trio, op.8 by Johannes Brahms) orchestrated by Joseph Swensen (2007)
- Symphony for Horn and Orchestra, The Fire and the Rose (2008)

Cultural offices
Preceded by Paul Daniel	Music Director, Orchestre National Bordeaux Aquitaine; 2024–present	Succeeded by incumbent
