= Roberto Benzi =

French conductor and former child actor (born 1937)

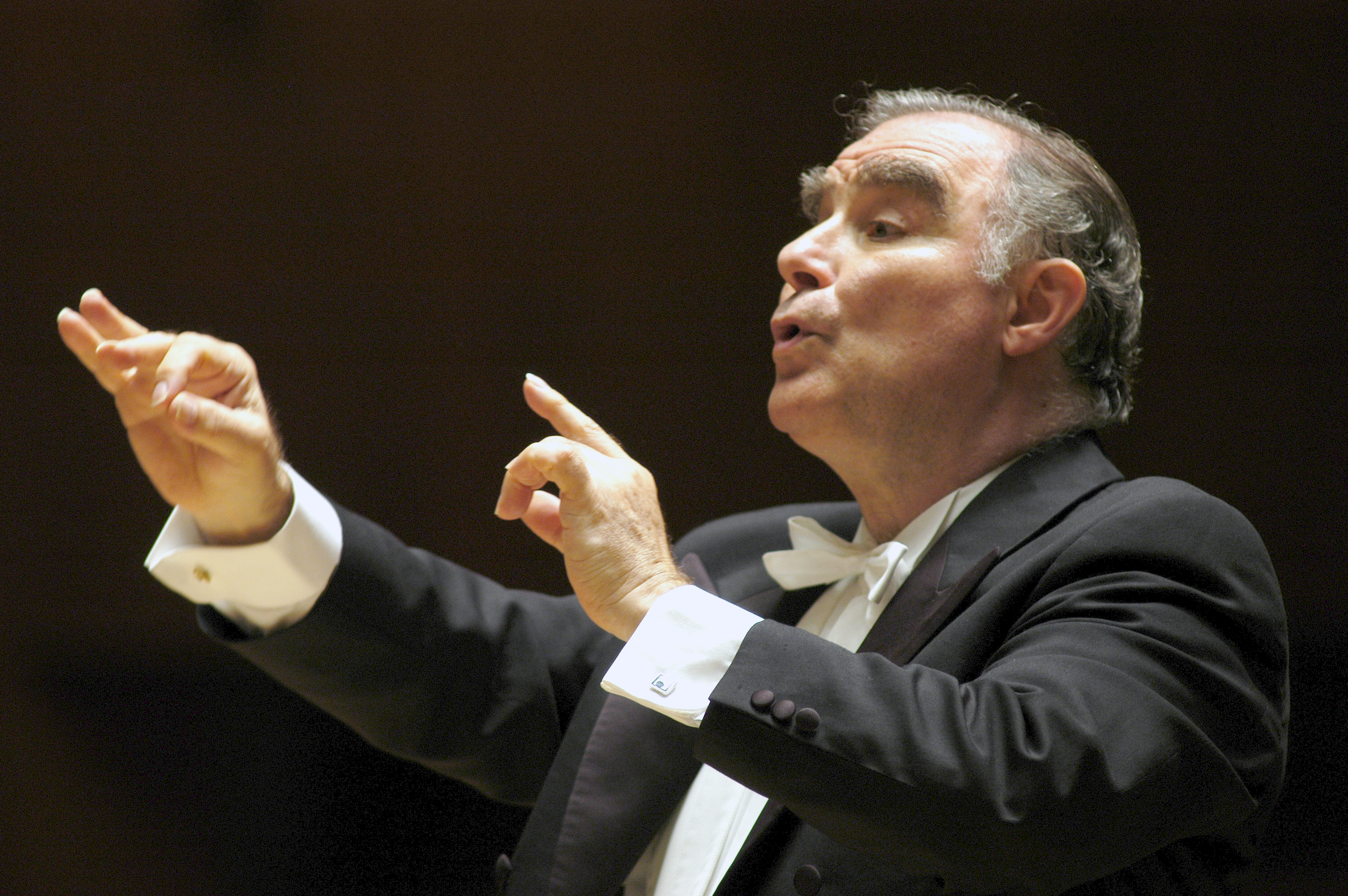
Roberto Benzi

Roberto Benzi (born 12 December 1937) is a French conductor and former child actor. A musical prodigy, he began conducting publicly as a child and attracted national attention in France during the late 1940s. He later pursued an international conducting career, serving as director of the orchestra that became the Orchestre National Bordeaux Aquitaine and as music director and artistic adviser of the Arnhem Philharmonic Orchestra in the Netherlands.

== Early life and education ==
Benzi was born in Marseille, France, to Italian parents. His father taught solfège, and Benzi began studying solfège at the age of three and piano at four. His musical abilities became apparent at an early age. Before he was ten, he received his first lessons in orchestral conducting in Paris from Belgian conductor André Cluytens.

Benzi began appearing publicly as a conductor while still a child. In May 1949, Le Monde published a profile of the ten-year-old musician following his work with the Société des Concerts du Conservatoire. The newspaper described his musical ability and his work conducting an orchestra at an unusually young age.

Alongside his early musical career, Benzi continued his education. He later completed his secondary studies and attended the Faculty of Letters at the Sorbonne, while privately pursuing further studies in musical analysis and composition.

== Film career ==
Benzi's early fame as a child conductor led to appearances in two French films directed by Georges Lacombe. The first, Prelude to Glory (Prélude à la gloire), was released in France in 1950 and centred on a young musical prodigy.

Benzi appeared again in Lacombe's The Call of Destiny (L'Appel du destin), alongside Jean Marais and Jacqueline Porel. In the film, Benzi played Roberto Lombardi, a young conductor whose story continued the musical theme of his earlier screen appearance.

The film was released in France in 1953.

== Conducting career ==
=== Early professional career ===
Benzi increasingly concentrated on professional conducting during the 1950s. His first operatic conducting engagement was in Marseille in 1954, where he conducted Gioachino Rossini's The Barber of Seville, with soprano Mado Robin appearing as Rosina.

In 1959, Benzi conducted Georges Bizet's Carmen when the opera entered the repertoire of the Paris Opera. The production opened on 10 November 1959 and was staged by Raymond Rouleau. Jane Rhodes sang the title role and Albert Lance performed Don José.

The production represented an important stage in Benzi's operatic career. He subsequently conducted both symphonic and operatic repertoire and worked with orchestras and opera companies in France and internationally.

=== Bordeaux and the Netherlands ===
Benzi became director and founder of the Orchestre Bordeaux-Aquitaine in 1972 and remained in the position until 1987. The orchestra later became known as the Orchestre National Bordeaux Aquitaine. From 1989 to 1998, he served as music director and artistic adviser of the Arnhem Philharmonic Orchestra (Het Gelders Orkest) in the Netherlands. He was also artistic superintendent and conductor of the Netherlands National Youth Orchestra from 1991 to 1995.

During his career, Benzi appeared with numerous European orchestras and ensembles. His engagements included orchestral and operatic performances in France, the United Kingdom, Germany, Italy, the Netherlands, Switzerland and other European countries, as well as appearances in North America and Asia.

== Recordings ==
Benzi began making recordings for Philips around 1960 and remained associated with the label for approximately fifteen years. His recorded repertoire included works by composers such as Franz Liszt, Ludwig van Beethoven, Georges Bizet, Gioachino Rossini and Ottorino Respighi. He later recorded for other labels, including EMI, Forlane and Naxos.

Among his later recordings was an album of orchestral works by César Franck with the Arnhem Philharmonic Orchestra. Released by Naxos in 1997, it included Franck's Symphony in D minor, Le Chasseur maudit and Les Éolides.

Another Naxos release featured Benzi conducting the Arnhem Philharmonic Orchestra in Franck's Symphonic Variations, Les Djinns and Piano Concerto No. 2.

== Teaching ==
In addition to performing, Benzi has taught orchestral conducting through masterclasses. According to the Opéra National de Bordeaux, he began teaching conducting in masterclasses in 1973, including courses held in France, Switzerland and the Netherlands.

He has also produced orchestrations published by music publishers including Peters, Salabert, Lemoine, Leduc and Billaudot.

== Personal life ==
Benzi was married to French opera singer Jane Rhodes. The two also worked together professionally. On 10 November 1959, Rhodes sang Carmen while Benzi conducted the Paris Opera production in which Bizet's work entered the company's repertoire.

Rhodes died on 7 May 2011 at the American Hospital of Paris in Neuilly-sur-Seine. In its obituary for Rhodes, Le Monde described her and Benzi as a prominent couple in French classical music and recalled their joint appearance in the 1959 production of Carmen.

== Honours ==
Benzi has received several French and Dutch honours. He was appointed a knight of the Legion of Honour, the Ordre national du Mérite and the Ordre des Palmes académiques. He was also appointed to the Dutch Order of the Netherlands Lion.

== Filmography ==
Film appearances
Year	Title	Director	Role	Ref.
1950	Prelude to Glory (Prélude à la gloire)	Georges Lacombe	Roberto	
1953	The Call of Destiny (L'Appel du destin)	Georges Lacombe	Roberto Lombardi	
