= Paul Daniel =

English conductor (born 1958)

Paul Daniel CBE (born 5 July 1958) is an English conductor.

== Biography ==
=== Early life ===
Daniel was born in Birmingham. As a boy, he sang in the choir of Coventry Cathedral, where he received musical training; then studied music at King's College, Cambridge. He learned conducting at the Guildhall School of Music and Drama in London, where his teachers included Sir Adrian Boult and Sir Edward Downes.

=== Career ===
In 1982, Daniel received a position on the musical staff of the English National Opera and remained there until 1987. In the late 1980s, he was the musical director of a number of amateur choirs, including Wokingham Choral Society, often featuring his future wife, the soprano Joan Rodgers.

From 1987 to 1990, he was music director of Opera Factory. From 1990 to 1997, he was the musical director of Opera North and principal conductor of the English Northern Philharmonia. He attracted attention for his work with neglected operas, including Dukas' Ariane et Barbe-bleue, Tippett's King Priam, Franz Schreker's Der Ferne Klang, Korngold's Violanta, and Britten's Gloriana, and for his work with newer repertory. He conducted Opera North in its 1992 debut at The Proms with Boris Godunov; as well as the world premieres of Michael Berkeley's Baa, Baa, Black Sheep, and of Benedict Mason's Playing Away at the Munich Biennale, where it won awards for best production and design.

He became Music Director of English National Opera in September 1997. When ENO general director Dennis Marks departed about a month later, it unexpectedly required Daniel to assume a more public role as the organization's artistic face, until Nicholas Payne arrived to assume Marks's duties. One analysis of this situation was that the additional work distracted Daniel from developing a fuller rapport with the orchestra. In December 2003, he announced his resignation from ENO at the end of his contract in 2005. Toward the later part of his tenure, there were also reports of clashes between Daniel and ENO artistic director Sean Doran. He expressed concerns about the future of ENO in an April 2005 interview with The Guardian, which led to ENO's Director of Marketing, Ian McKay, booing Daniel at his last performance as ENO music director. Daniel's work at ENO included the world premiere of Mark-Anthony Turnage's The Silver Tassie, which was recorded for commercial release.

Daniel guest-conducted the West Australian Symphony Orchestra (WASO) in 1995, and again in April 2006. In May 2007, he was named the WASO's next principal conductor as of January 2009, with an initial contract through December 2011. In November 2010, the WASO announced the extension of his contract through December 2013, at which time he concluded his WASO tenure.

Daniel became principal guest conductor of the Real Filharmonía de Galicia (Santiago de Compostela) in 2007. In January 2012, he was named the orchestra's next principal conductor and artistic adviser, as of January 2013, with an initial contract of three years. In July 2012, the Orchestre National Bordeaux Aquitaine (ONBA) announced Daniel's appointment as its next music director, effective with the 2013–2014 season. He had previously guest-conducted the ONBA in 2006 and 2011. In May 2017, the ONBA announced the extension of Daniel's contract through 2021.

Daniel's honours include an Olivier Award in February 1998 for outstanding achievement in opera, and a Gramophone Award in 1999 for his English music series on Naxos Records. He was made a CBE in the 2000 New Year's Honours list. In September 2005, he conducted the Last Night of the Proms for the first time.

Daniel has two daughters from his past marriage to opera singer Joan Rodgers. The marriage ended in divorce; Rodgers married Alan Samson in 2013. Daniel's commercial recordings, which include performances with Rodgers, are featured on a number of record labels, including Chandos, Naxos, Linn, and Aeon.

Cultural offices
Preceded by David Lloyd-Jones	Music Director, Opera North; 1990–1997	Succeeded by Elgar Howarth (Music Advisor)
Preceded by Sîan Edwards	Music Director, English National Opera; 1997–2005	Succeeded by Edward Gardner
Preceded by Antoni Ros-Marbà	Principal Conductor and Artistic Adviser, Real Filharmonía de Galicia; 2013–present	Succeeded by incumbent
Preceded by Kwamé Ryan	Music Director, Orchestre National Bordeaux Aquitaine; 2013–2023	Succeeded by Joseph Swensen
