= Laurent Korcia =

French violinist

Laurent Korcia (born 1964) is a French violinist who studied at the Conservatoire National Supérieur de Musique de Paris. After receiving a Premier Prix diploma from the Conservatoire, he won the Paganini Competition in Genoa, a Grand Prix at the Jacques Thibaud Competition, the Premier Grand Prix at the international Zino Francescatti Competition and a scholarship from the Young Concert Artists Trust in London.

In 2002, he was awarded the Victoires de la Musique as instrumental soloist of the year in France and was made Chevalier des Arts et des Lettres. He also received the George Enesco Prize of the SACEM and the Grand Prix of the Academie Charles Cross.

Korcia performs regularly with conductors such as Semyon Bychkov, Charles Dutoit, Daniele Gatti, Valery Gergiev, Emmanuel Krivine, Kurt Masur, John Nelson, Michel Plasson, Manuel Rosenthal, Yutaka Sado, Tugan Sokhiev, Vladimir Spivakov, Yan-Pascal Tortelier, and Walter Weller. He includes solo violin recitals in his concert repertoire, with programmes ranging from Bach to contemporary music.

September 13 and 14, 2008 Korcia performed sold out concerts at Les Folies Bergère in the 9th arrondissement in Paris. The resulting television special is featured on American Public Television, including several top market stations. Korcia CDs (Sony/BMG, Naïve) are solid sellers in France. His music has been used in movies, commercials and television programs. He was signed to a worldwide contract by EMI in 2008 and his Cinema album was released in Europe in March 2009, followed by such diverse markets as South Korea, South Africa and Australia. The USA release was released 28 July 2009. The Canadian release date was also 7/28/09, through EMI. Mexico followed in early August.

Since 1999, Korcia has been playing on the Zahn Stradivarius (1719), a violin on loan by the French group LVMH, Moët-Hennessy-Louis Vuitton.

== Discography ==
- Cinema - EMI 2009
- Violon Passion - BMG France 2002
- Limited Edition - Naive
- Double Jeux - Naive
- Bartók- Naive
- Danses - Naive
- Une Priere - RCA
- Nos Souvenirs - RCA
- Tzigane - RCA
- Bartók - Lyrinx
- Eugène Ysaÿe - Lyrinx
- Ernest Chausson - Naxos

== Awards ==
- Premier Prix - Conservatoire National Supérieur de Musique de Paris
- Grand Prix -Paganini Competition
- Grand Prix - Jacques Thibaud Competition
- Grand Prix - Zino Francescatti Competition
- Soloist of the year -Victoires de la Musique
- George Enesco Prize - SACEM
- Grand Prix - Academie Charles Cross.

== Videos ==
- Laurent Korcia "Vivement Dimanche"
- Laurent Korcia "Cinema"
- Laurent Korcia Interview
- Laurent Korcia on French TV: "Les Valseuses"
- Laurent Korcia & Jean-Louis Aubert
- Laurent Korcia and AYO
- Laurent Korcia: "Minor Swing"
- Laurent Korica: "Les Parapluis De Cherbourg"
- Laurent Korcia: "Transcending the Violin"
