= Georges Lacombe =

Georges Lacombe is the name of:

- Georges Lacombe (painter) (1868–1916), French sculptor and painter
- Georges Lacombe (director) (1902–1990), French film director
