= Francis Planté =

French pianist (1839–1934)

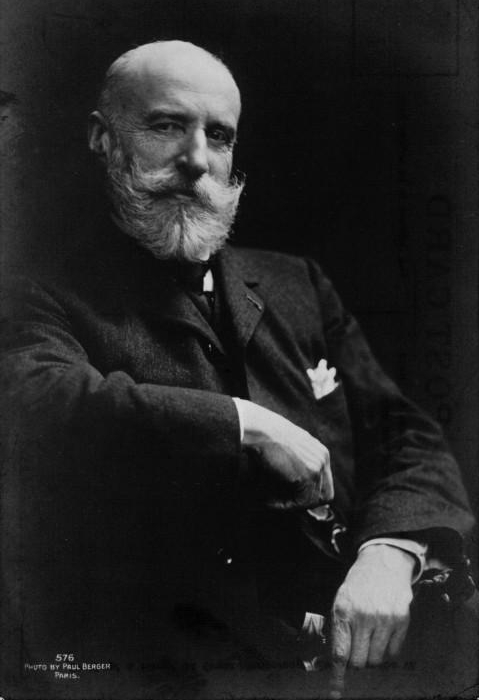
Francis Planté

Francis Planté (2 March 1839 – 19 December 1934) was a French pianist famed as one of the first ever recording artists.

Planté was born in Orthez. He studied piano under Antoine Marmontel, his career beginning at the age of seven in Paris. While there he met and befriended many musicians who would have a long-lasting effect on his career. These included Franz Liszt, with whom he played arrangements of two of Liszt's symphonic poems (Les Préludes, and Tasso, Lamento e Trionfo) for 2 pianos, Hector Berlioz, Gioachino Rossini, Charles Gounod, Felix Mendelssohn, Sigismond Thalberg and Charles-Marie Widor.

He toured the concert platforms of Europe after leaving Paris, expanding his reputation for quality of tone and virtuosic, emotional interpretations. The death of his wife in 1908 resulted in him retiring from the stage, except for charity performances and concerts in aid of those wounded in the First World War. He had many pupils, including Alexander Brailowsky. He died in Saint-Avit.

Planté is featured in the 1999 DVD The Art of Piano, in which a short excerpt from the film of him playing Chopin's Étude in C, Op. 10 No. 7 can be seen.

Francis Planté's style is considered very different from modern-day recording artists. The recordings available suggest a more paced performance with a more prominent accent on each beat and with the notes more pronounced.

Recordings that Planté made include:

- Chopin: Études Op. 10, Nos. 4, 5 and 7
- Chopin: Études Op. 25, Nos. 1, 2, 9 and 11
- Berlioz: Serenade
- Mendelssohn: Scherzo in E, Op. 16, No. 3.
- Boccherini: Minuet
