= Kwamé Ryan =

Trinidadian-Canadian conductor

Kwamé Ryan is a Trinidadian-Canadian conductor. Since 2024, he has been music director of the Charlotte Symphony Orchestra.

== Biography ==
=== Early history and education ===
Born in Toronto, Ontario, Kwamé Ryan is the son of Joya Gomez, an Educator/Actress and Selwyn Ryan, a university professor. He had his primary and early musical education at the University School, St Augustine, Trinidad. A month after his birth, the family moved to Uganda. Several years later, the family moved to Trinidad. He studied piano, violin and voice privately.

Ryan subsequently moved to the United Kingdom, where he attended Oakham School, in Rutland, England. He then studied musicology at Gonville and Caius College, Cambridge. His UK mentors included Mark Elder. In Germany, Ryan attended the University of Tübingen for two years, for language and culture studies. Ryan later studied conducting with Peter Eötvös in Hungary. Other conducting mentors included Lothar Zagrosek.

=== Conducting career ===
From 1999 to 2003, he served as Generalmusikdirektor (GMD, general music director) of the Freiburg Opera and Freiburg Philharmonic Orchestra.

In 2007, Ryan became music director of the Orchestre National Bordeaux Aquitaine (ONBA), for an initial contract of 3 years. He held the ONBA post until June 2013, during which period several commercial recordings were released. He served as music director of l'Orchestre Français des Jeunes from 2008 to 2011.

Ryan was appointed Professor and Director of the University of Trinidad and Tobago's National Academy for the Performing Arts in 2015, focusing on youth arts and community development projects, until the end of his tenure in 2022. In January 2023, Ryan first guest-conducted the Charlotte Symphony Orchestra. Ryan returned to the Charlotte Symphony for a further guest-conducting engagement in November 2023. In December 2023, the Charlotte Symphony Orchestra announced the appointment of Ryan as its next music director, effective as of the 2024–2025 season, with an initial contract of four years. In September 2026, the Charlotte Symphony Orchestra announced an extension of Ryan's contract as its music director through the 2031–2032 season.

At the 2026 Grammy Awards Ceremony, Ryan was awarded his first Grammy for Houston Grand Opera's recording of Jake Heggie's Intelligence.

=== Recordings ===
Ryan's recordings include:

- Simplicius Simplicissimus by Karl Amadeus Hartmann from Stuttgart (2005, DVD)
- Vortex Temporum by Gerard Grisey
- Works by Salvatore Sciarrino with Ensemble Recherché
- Prometeo by Luigi Nono
- Neither by Morton Feldman
- Schubert: Symphony No. 9 / Rachmaninov: Symphony No. 2, with Orchestre National Bordeaux Aquitaine
- Beethoven: Piano Concertos No. 1 and No. 2 with Shani Diluka and Orchestra National Bordeaux Aquitaine
- Kris Defoort: The Time of Our Singing
- Jake Heggie and Gene Scheer: Intelligence

== See also ==
- Black conductors

Cultural offices
Preceded by Johannes Fritzsch	Generalmusikdirektor, Freiburg Opera and Freiburg Philharmonic Orchestra; 1999–2003	Succeeded by Patrik Ringborg
Preceded by Christian Lauba	Music Director, Orchestre National Bordeaux Aquitaine; 2007–2013	Succeeded by Paul Daniel
Preceded by Dennis Russell Davies	Music Director, Orchestre Français des Jeunes; 2009–2010	Succeeded by Dennis Russell Davies
Preceded by Christopher Warren-Green	Music Director, Charlotte Symphony Orchestra; 2024–present	Succeeded by incumbent
