= Hans Graf =

Austrian conductor (born 1949)

Hans Graf (born 15 February 1949 in Marchtrenk) is an Austrian conductor.

== Biography ==
As a child, Graf learned the violin and the piano. He studied at the Musikhochschule in Graz, Austria, and graduated with diplomas in piano and conducting. He also participated in conducting master classes with Franco Ferrara, Sergiu Celibidache, and Arvīds Jansons. He received a state scholarship at the Leningrad Conservatory with Jansons. For the 1975/1976 season Graf was music director of the Iraqi National Symphony Orchestra in Baghdad. After winning the Karl Böhm conductor's competition in 1979, he made his debut at the Vienna State Opera in 1981 with Stravinsky's Petrouchka.

From 1984 to 1994, Graf was music director of the Mozarteum Orchestra of Salzburg, where he recorded the complete symphonies and other works by Mozart. From 1994 to 1996, he held the position of music director of the Basque National Orchestra. He was music director of the Calgary Philharmonic Orchestra from 1995 to 2003. He served as music director of the Orchestre National Bordeaux Aquitaine from 1998 to 2004.

Graf first conducted the Houston Symphony in 2000, and became its music director in 2001. He made his Carnegie Hall conducting debut with the Houston Symphony in 2006. At the conclusion of his Houston tenure in 2013, Graf took the title of conductor laureate. He has been an artist-in-residence at the Shepherd School of Music, Rice University. On 2 December 2012 Graf was honoured by the Bruckner Society of America with the Kilenyi Medal of Honor for his performances of the Bruckner's Symphonies 3-4 and 6-9, including the sketches to Finale of the 9th, as well as the Mass No. 2 and the Te Deum.

From 2013 to 2015, Graf was professor of orchestral conducting at Mozarteum University Salzburg. In 2018, he won a Grammy award for his recording of Alban Berg's Wozzeck with Anne Schwanewilms, Roman Trekel and the Houston Symphony. This recording had received an ECHO Klassik award in 2017.

Graf first appeared with the Singapore Symphony Orchestra in 2015, and returned for a further guest engagement in 2018. In July 2019, the Singapore Symphony Orchestra announced his appointment as its new chief conductor, effective with the 2020–2021 season. Graf concluded his tenure with the Singapore Symphony Orchestra at the close of the 2025–2026 season.

In private life, Graf is known as a wine connoisseur. He received the Legion of Honour from the French government in 2002. He and his wife, Margarita, have a daughter, Anna.

== Discography ==
- 1981: Franz Lehár: Der Rastelbinder (First recording). Fritz Muliar, Elfie Hobarth, Helga Papouschek, Heinz Zednik, Adolf Dallapozza, Wiener Mozart Sängerknaben, ORF Chor, Radio-Symphonieorchester Wien (CPO/WDR/ORF)
- 1987: Alexander Zemlinsky: Es war einmal (First recording). Eva Johansson, Kurt Westi, Aage Haugland, Per Arne Wahlgren, Danish National Radio Symphony Orchestra & Chorus (Capriccio)
- 1988: Wolfgang Amadeus Mozart: Marches. Mozarteum Orchester Salzburg (Capriccio)
- 1989: Ludwig van Beethoven: Piano Concertos No. 1 in C major & No. 4 G major. Maria Tipo, London Symphony Orchestra (EMI)
- 1989: Wolfgang Amadeus Mozart: Concert for flute and harp, K. 299; Rondo in D major, K.Anh. 184; Concert for flute in D major, K. 314; Andante for flute and orchestra in C major, K. 315. Simion Stanciu, Helga Storck, Mozarteum Orchester Salzburg (Erato)
- 1989–1990: Wolfgang Amadeus Mozart: The complete symphonies. Mozarteum Orchester Salzburg (Capriccio, 13 CDs)
- 1990: Wolfgang Amadeus Mozart: Violin Concertos No. 1 B-flat major, K. 207, No. 2 in D major, K 211; Adagio for violin and orchestra, K. 261; Rondos for violin and orchestra, K. 269 and K. 373. Benjamin Schmid, Mozarteum Orchester Salzburg (Capriccio)
- 1990: Wolfgang Amadeus Mozart: Concertos for flute and orchestra K 313 & 314, Andante for flute and orchestra in C major K 315, Rondo in D major K Anh. 184. Shigenori Kudo, Mozarteum Orchester Salzburg (NEC Classics)
- 1990: Wolfgang Amadeus Mozart: 'Dances and Minuets'. Mozarteum Orchester Salzburg (Capriccio)
- 1992–1994: Wolfgang Amadeus Mozart: Piano concertos K 271, 414, 456, 459, 466, 467, 482, 488, 491, 503, 537, 595. Éric Heidsieck, Mozarteum Orchester Salzburg (JVC, 6 CDs)
- 1994: Anton Bruckner: Symphony Nr. 8. Mozarteum Orchester Salzburg (VFMO 0894-1/2)
- 1997: Manuel de Falla: Nights in the Gardens of Spain. Isaac Albeniz: Rapsodia Española, Joaquin Turina: Rapsodia Sinfonica, Xavier Montsalvatge: Concierto Breve. Angela Cheng, Calgary Philharmonic Orchestra (CBC Records)
- 1999: Franz Liszt: Piano Concertos Nos. 1 in E-flat major, 2 in A major, 3 in E-flat major (Op. posth., ed. Jerry Rosenblatt), Concerto in the Hungarian style ("Sophie Menter-Konzert", orch. P.I. Tschaikowski). Janina Fialkowska, Calgary Philharmonic Orchestra (CBC Records)
- 1998–2000: Franz Schubert: The complete symphonies, 4 overtures. Aarhus Symphony Orchestra (Kontrapunkt, 5 CDs)
- 1999: Gustav Mahler: Symphony No. 1 in D major (including Blumine). Calgary Philharmonic Orchestra (CPO Label)
- 2000–2004: Henri Dutilleux: Orchestral works: Symphony No. 2, Métaboles, The Shadows of Time, Symphony Nr. 1, Tout un monde lointain… (cello concerto), Timbres, Espace, Mouvement ou La Nuit Etoilée, L'Arbre des Songes (violin concerto), La Geôle (first recording), Deux Sonnets de Jean Cassou, Mystère de l'Instant (version for large orchestra). Jean Guihen Queyras, Olivier Charlier, François Le Roux, Orchestre National Bordeaux Aquitaine (Arte Nova/Sony, 3 CDs)
- 2001: Darius Milhaud: Saudades do Brazil, Scaramouche for saxophone and orchestra. Heitor Villa-Lobos: Descobrimento do Brazil (Suite 2 & 3). Jeremy Brown, Calgary Philharmonic Orchestra (CBC Records)
- 2001: Carl Orff: Carmina Burana. Christine Brandes, Noel E. Velasco, Stephen Powell, Fort Bend Boys Chorus, Houston Symphony Orchestra & Chorus (HS Label)
- 2004: Béla Bartók: The Wooden Prince, Igor Strawinski: Divertimento (from Le Baiser de la Fée). Houston Symphony (Koch International)
- 2004: Wolfgang Amadeus Mozart: Requiem, K. 626, Symphony C-Dur K. 338, Sinfonia Concertante for violin, viola and cello K Anh. 104 (Fragment, orch. Hans Graf). Heidi Grant Murphy, Jane Gilbert, Stanford Olsen, Nathan Berg, Eric Halen, Wayne Brooks, Brinton Smith, Houston Symphony Orchestra & Chorus (HS Label, 2 CDs)
- 2004: Anton Bruckner: Symphony No. 4 in E-flat major. Houston Symphony (HS Label)
- 2006: Johann Strauss jr.: Overtures, Waltzes, Polkas. Houston Symphony Orchestra & Chorus (HS Label)
- 2007: George Gershwin: An American in Paris, Concerto in F, Porgy and Bess, A Symphonic Picture (arr. Richard Bennett). Jon Kimura Parker, Houston Symphony (HS Label)
- 2007: Alexander Zemlinsky: Lyrische Symphonie, op. 18; Alban Berg: Three Pieces from the Lyric Suite (version for string orchestra). Twyla Robinson, Roman Trekel, Houston Symphony (Naxos)
- 2009: Gustav Mahler: Das Lied von der Erde. Jane Henschel, Gregory Kunde, Houston Symphony (Naxos)
- 2010: The Planets. An HD Odyssey (DVD with film material from NASA, Video by Duncan Copp). Music: Gustav Holst: The Planets. Houston Symphony (HS Label)
- 2012: Paul Hindemith: Works for Viola and Orchestra (Der Schwanendreher, Trauermusik, Kammermusik Nr. 5 op. 36 Nr. 4, Konzertmusik op. 48a. First recording of early version). Tabea Zimmermann, Deutsches Symphonie-Orchester Berlin (Myrios)
- 2014: Carl Orff: Carmina Burana. Sarah Tynan, Andrew Kennedy, Rodion Pogossow, London Philharmonic Orchestra & Choir, Trinity Boys Choir (LPO)
- 2017: Alban Berg: Wozzeck. Roman Trekel, Anne Schwanewilms, Houston Symphony (Naxos). ECHO Klassik Prize 2017 for best 20th/21st century opera recording and Grammy 2018 award for best opera recording.

Cultural offices
Preceded by Leopold Hager	Music Director, Mozarteum Orchestra of Salzburg; 1984–1994	Succeeded by Hubert Soudant
Preceded by Maximiano Valdés	Music Director, Orquesta de Euskadi; 1994–1996	Succeeded by Gilbert Varga, Mario Venzago
Preceded by Mario Bernardi	Music Director, Calgary Philharmonic Orchestra; 1995–2003	Succeeded by Roberto Minczuk
Preceded by John Neschling	Music Director, Orchestre National Bordeaux Aquitaine; 1998–2004	Succeeded by Kwamé Ryan
Preceded by Lan Shui	Chief Conductor and Music Director, Singapore Symphony Orchestra; 2020–2022 (Chief Conductor), 2022–2026 (Music Director)	Succeeded by Hannu Lintu
