= Gaston Poulet =

French violinist and conductor

Gaston Poulet (10 April 1892 – 14 April 1974) was a French violinist and conductor. He played an important part in the diffusion of the contemporary music of the first half of the 20th century. His son Gérard Poulet, born in 1938, is also a violinist.

== Life and career ==
Born in Paris, Poulet entered the Conservatoire de Paris in 1904, studying under Lefort and Jean Huré, and winning a first prize in 1910 in violin.

Noticed by Pierre Monteux, Poulet soon became recognized as one of the leading violinists of his generation and was taken on as leader of the orchester for performances by the Ballets Russes. He thus took part in many premieres by the company of Serge Diaghilev.

In 1914 he founded an eponymous string quartet with Henri Giraud (violin), Albert Leguillard (viola)et Louis Ruyssen (cello). He was called up for service during the First World War but after illness was invalided out, and then continued chamber music work with his partners. Their repertoire extended to contemporary works such as the quartet by Claude Debussy. Poulet was then offered the creation of the violin sonata by Debussy, on 5 May 1917 at the salle Gaveau in Paris, accompanied by the composer. This concert, in aid of the Foyer du soldat aveugle, Poulet also played the Symphonie espagnole by Édouard Lalo.

From the 1920s, Poulet slowly reduced his playing in favour of conducting. In 1926 he led the first performance at the salle Pleyel of the Concerts Poulet (later merged with the Concerts Robert Siohan). This orchestral series particularly featured music by young composers, and included premieres of works by Sergei Prokofiev, Florent Schmitt, Albert Roussel, André Caplet and member of groupe des Six. The weekly concerts were held at the Théâtre Sarah Bernhardt up to 1932.

In 1932, Poulet became Director of the Conservatoire in Bordeaux and founded a concert series there entitled the Association des Professeurs du Conservatoire, in 1943 becoming l'Orchestre philharmonique de Bordeaux. Poulet also appears outside France during these years, in Geneva and Buenos Aires. During the war years he also led the Concerts Colonne (for that period called Concerts Pierné) alongside Louis Fourestier and François Ruhlmann.

In 1944 he left the Conservatoire de Bordeaux to become a professor of chamber music at the Conservatoire de Paris, remaining there until 1962. He began the Festival de musique de Besançon in 1948 which attracted international attention, complemented from 1951 by a conducting competition.

== Discography ==
With his Concerts Poulet Orchestra, he recorded with French Decca: Mendelssohn Symphony No.4 in A Op.90 “Italian”, the Introduction & Bridal procession from Rimsky-Korsakov's The Golden Cockerel (1930), Weber's overture to Euryanthe and Saint-Saens's Wedding Cake - Caprice Op.76 (with Janine Weill) (1930–31), excerpts from Stravinsky's Petrushka (with Jean Doyen) and the third and fourth songs of Mussorgsky's Songs and Dances of Death with Antoinette Tikanova.

During the war he recorded Iberia and the Franck Symphonic Variations (with Yves Nat) with the Concerts pierné.

With the London Symphony Orchestra Poulet made recordings of Elizalde's Violin Concerto with the 14-year-old Christian Ferras (Decca, 1947), Spanish orchestral miniatures by Albeniz, Granados, Falla and Turina (MGM, 1953), Saint-Saens Violin Concerto No.3 in B minor Op.61 with Yehudi Menuhin (His Master's Voice, 1953) and orchestral works by Ravel and Fauré (M.G.M., 1953–54).

Cultural offices
Preceded by none	Music Director, Société des concerts du conservatoire 1940–1944	Succeeded by Georges Carrère
