= Grand Théâtre de Bordeaux =

Opera house in Bordeaux, France

The Grand Théâtre de Bordeaux
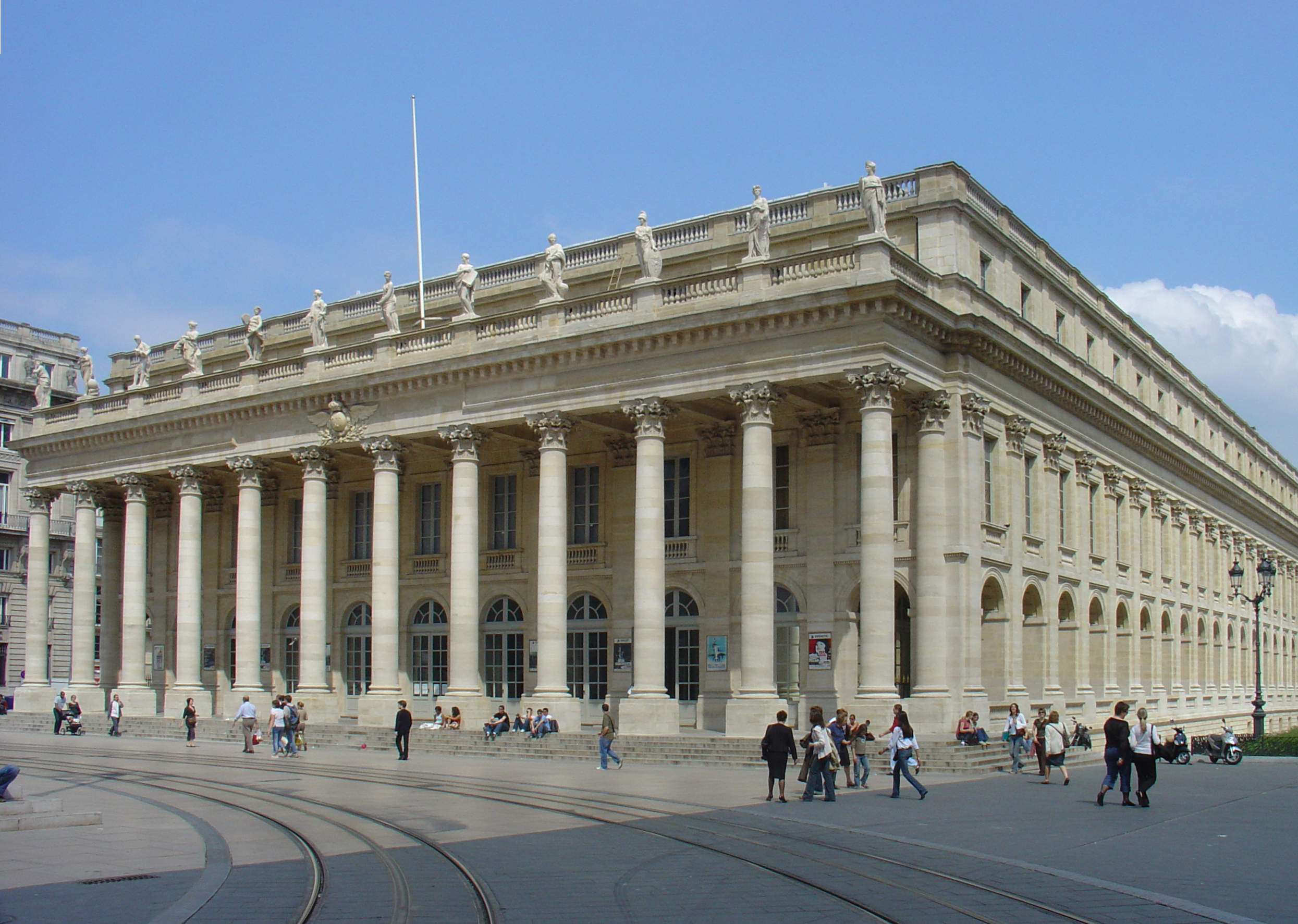
- Exterior of the Grand Theatre
- Interactive map of The Grand Théâtre de Bordeaux
- Address: Place de la Comédie; Bordeaux; France
- Coordinates: 44°50′33″N 0°34′25″W
- Owner: University hospital
- Capacity: 1,100

Construction
- Opened: 1780
- Architect: Victor Louis

Website
- www.opera-bordeaux.com

The Grand Théâtre de Bordeaux (French pronunciation: [ɡʁɑ̃ teɑtʁ də bɔʁdo]) is an opera house in Bordeaux, France, first inaugurated on 17 April 1780. It was in this theatre that the ballet La fille mal gardée premiered in 1789, and where a young Marius Petipa staged some of his first ballets.

The theatre was designed by the architect Victor Louis (1731–1800). Louis later designed the galleries surrounding, the gardens of the Palais Royal, and the Théâtre Français in Paris.

The Grand Theatre of Bordeaux was conceived as a temple of the Arts and Light, with a neo-classical facade. It has a portico of 12 Corinthian style colossal columns which support an entablature on which stand 12 statues that represent the nine Muses and three goddesses (Juno, Venus and Minerva). Pierre-François Berruer made four of the statues, and his assistant Van den Drix carved the others from Berruer's models.

The interior grand staircase served as a model for the grand staircase of the Opéra Garnier in Paris.

On the ceiling of the auditorium, there is a large fresco painted by Jean-Baptiste-Claude Robin. It pays homage to the Arts, to the artisans that built the building, and to the city of Bordeaux. The late scene shows a woman, allegory of Bordeaux, protected by Hermes and Athena, and in the foreground, three wealth of the city : the wine, the sea trade and the slave.

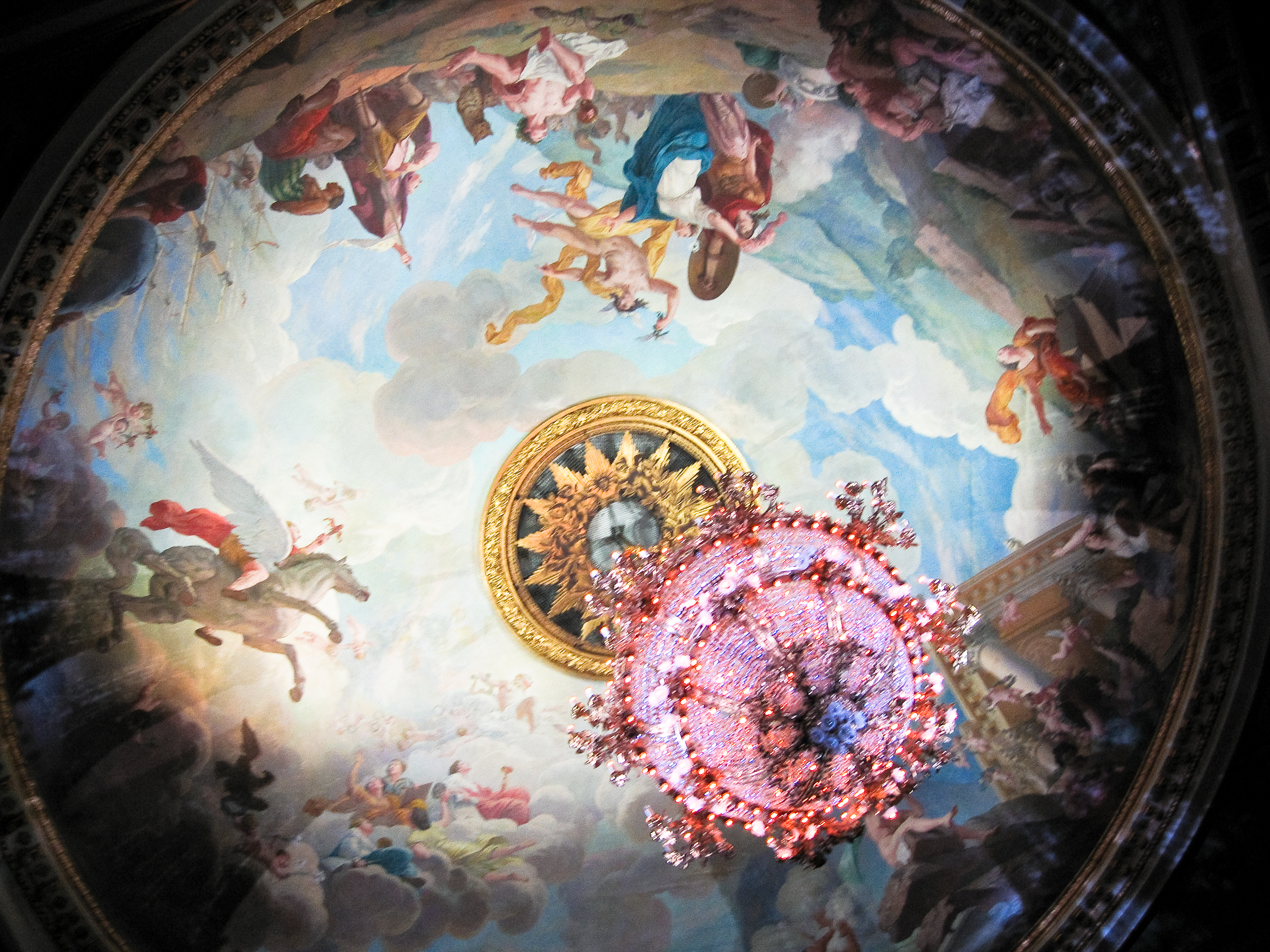
Ceiling fresco.

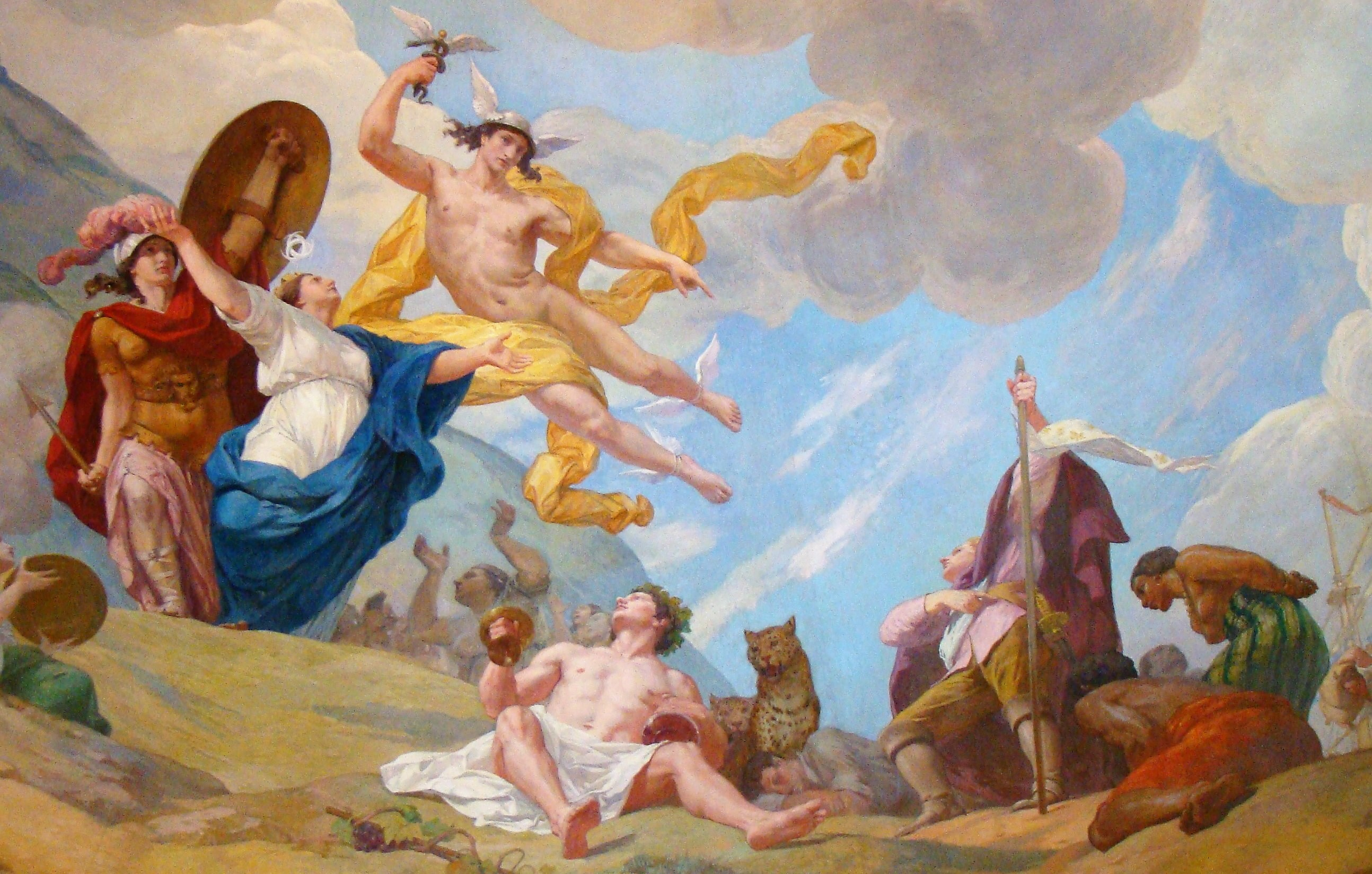
Scene of Bordeaux and her wealth.

In 1871, the theatre was briefly the National Assembly for the French Parliament.

The inside of the theatre was restored in 1991, and once again has its original colours of blue and gold. The Grand Théâtre de Bordeaux is one of the oldest wooden frame opera houses in Europe not to have burnt or required rebuilding.

Today, the theatre is home to the Opéra National de Bordeaux, as well as the Ballet National de Bordeaux which has many international dancers.

== Gallery ==
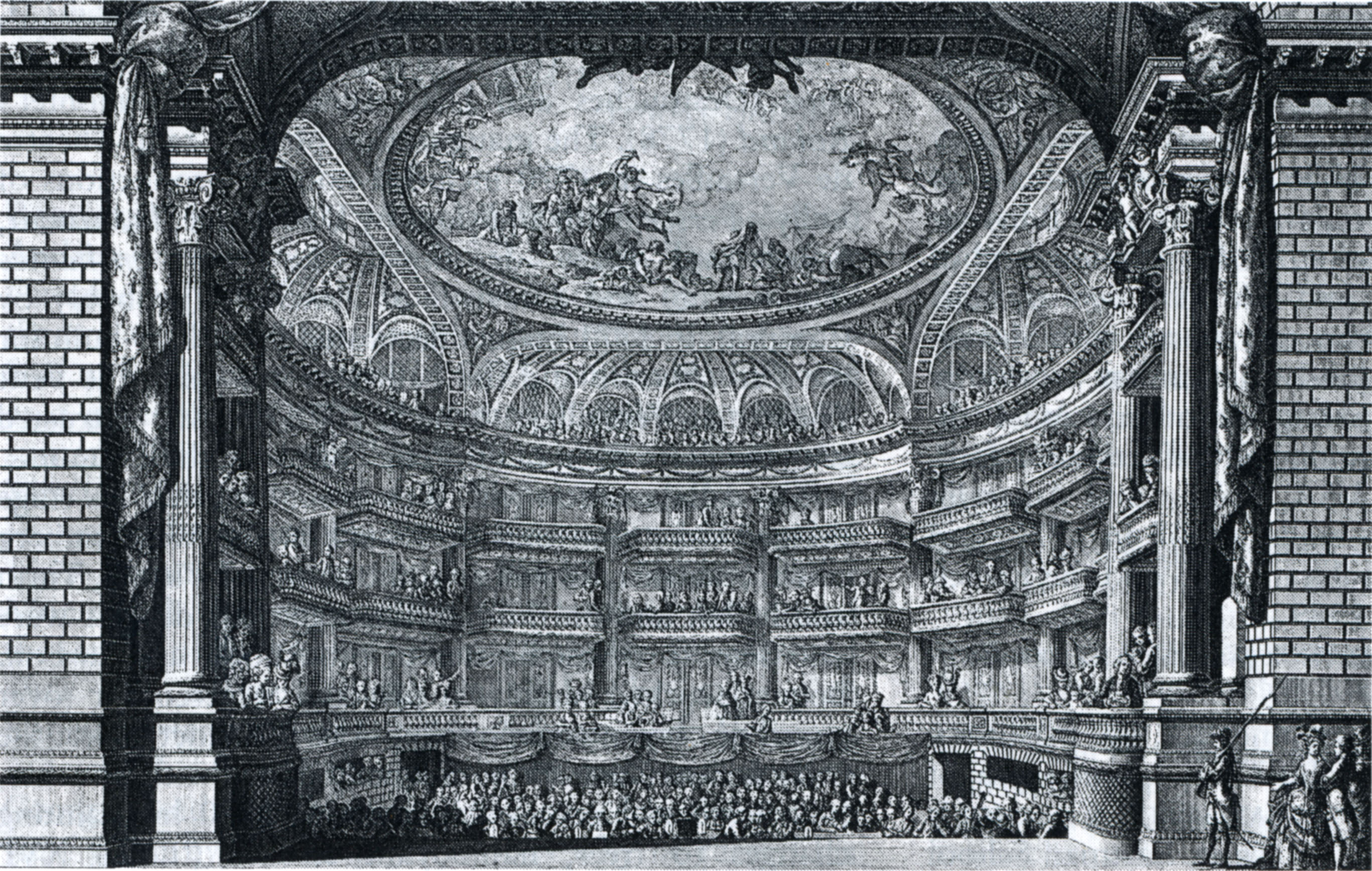
Auditorium

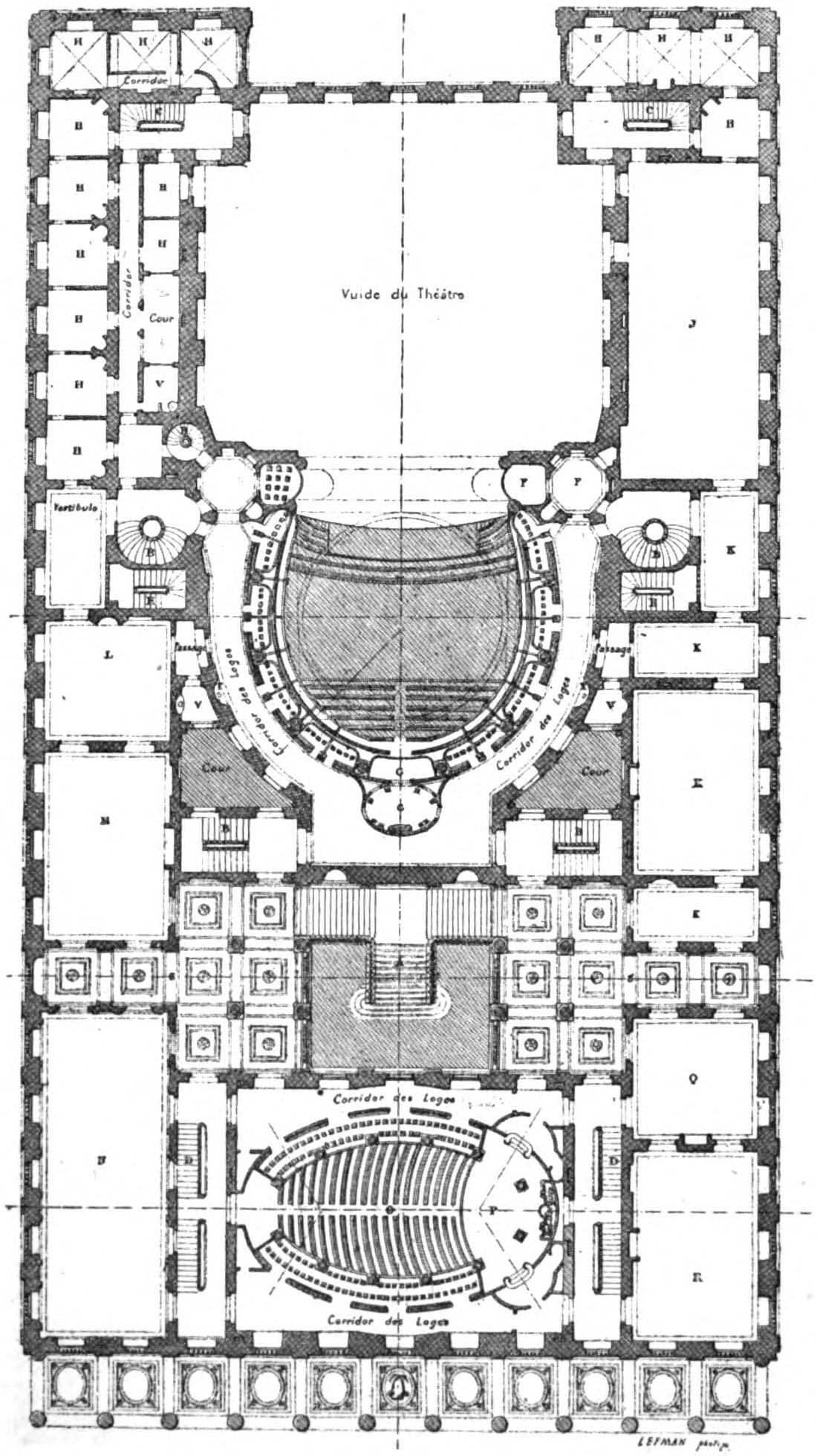
Plan (1881)

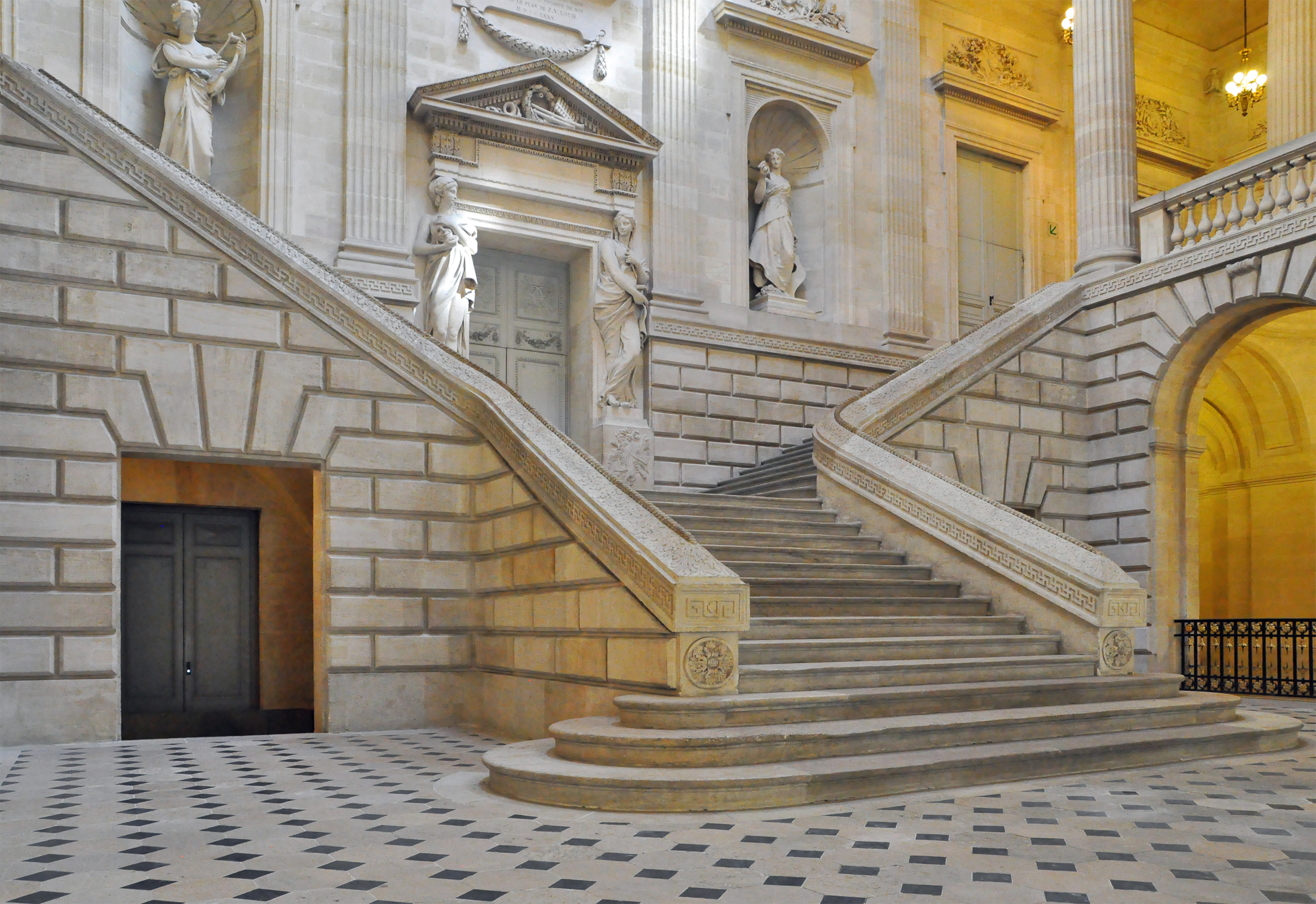
Grand staircase

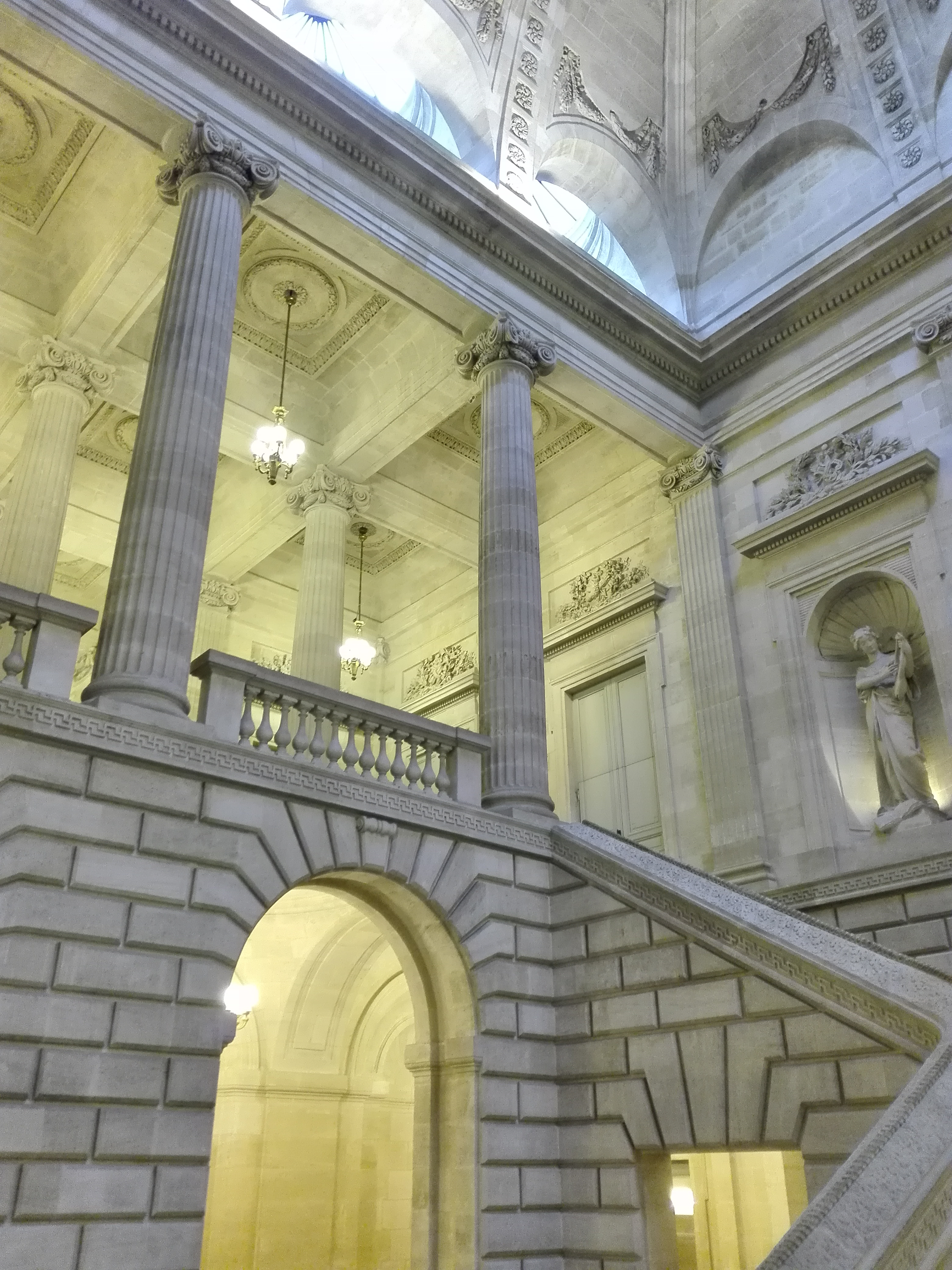
Grand staircase

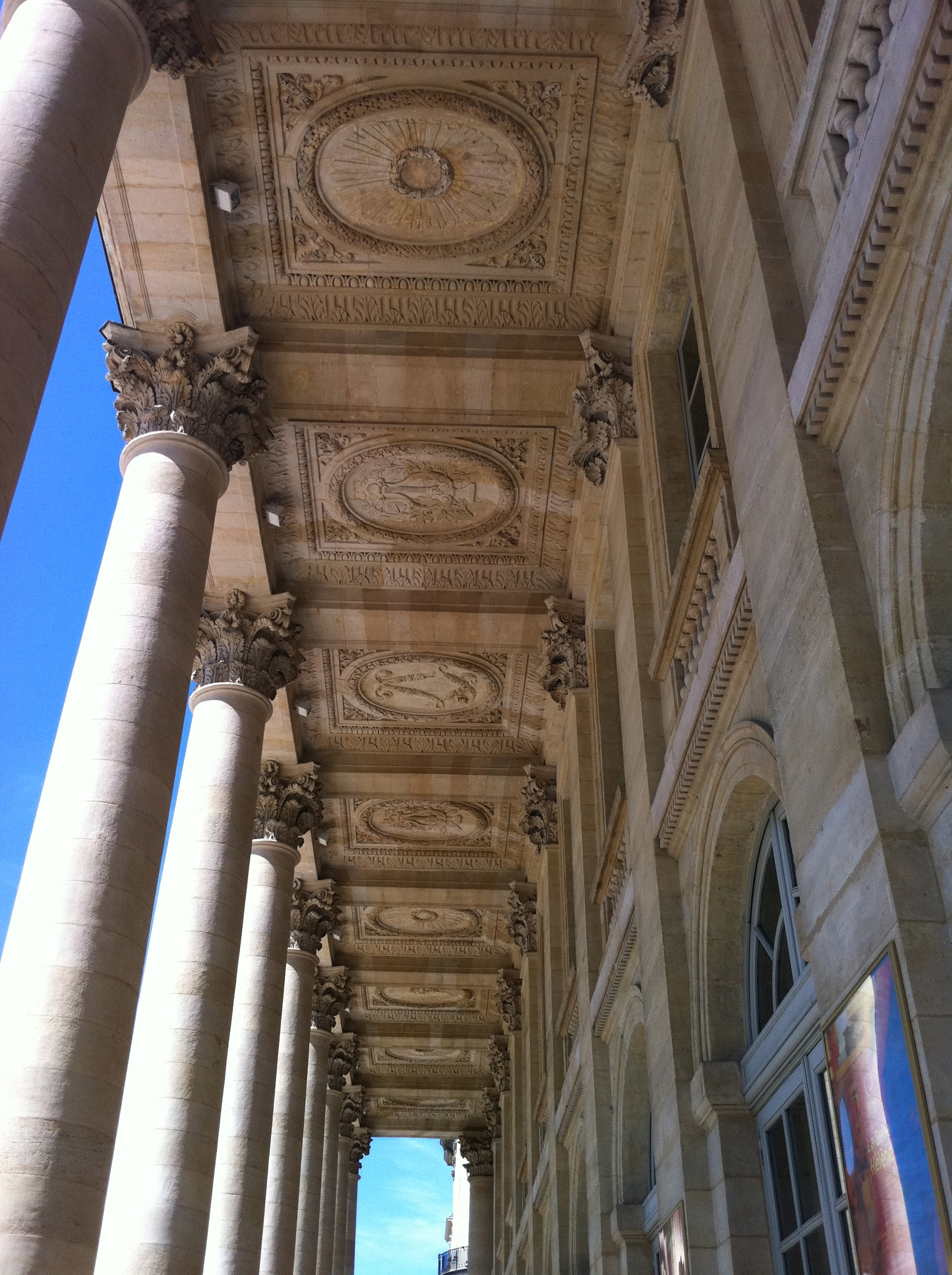
Portico

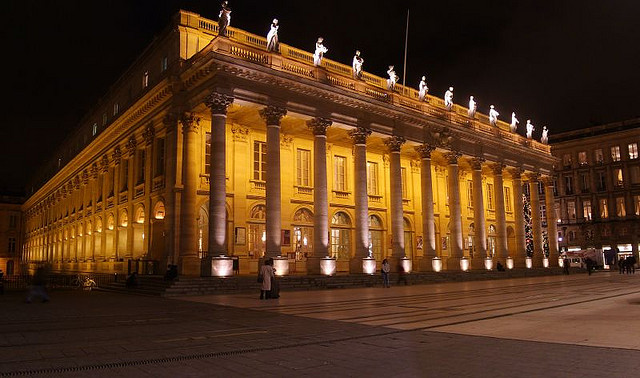
By night

== Bibliography ==
- Laurent Croizier, Luc Bourrousse (2011). The Grand-Théâtre of Bordeaux. Bordeaux: Le Festin. ISBN 978-2-36062-040-1.
