= Conservatoire de Bordeaux =

Coordinates: 44°49′53″N 0°33′34″W

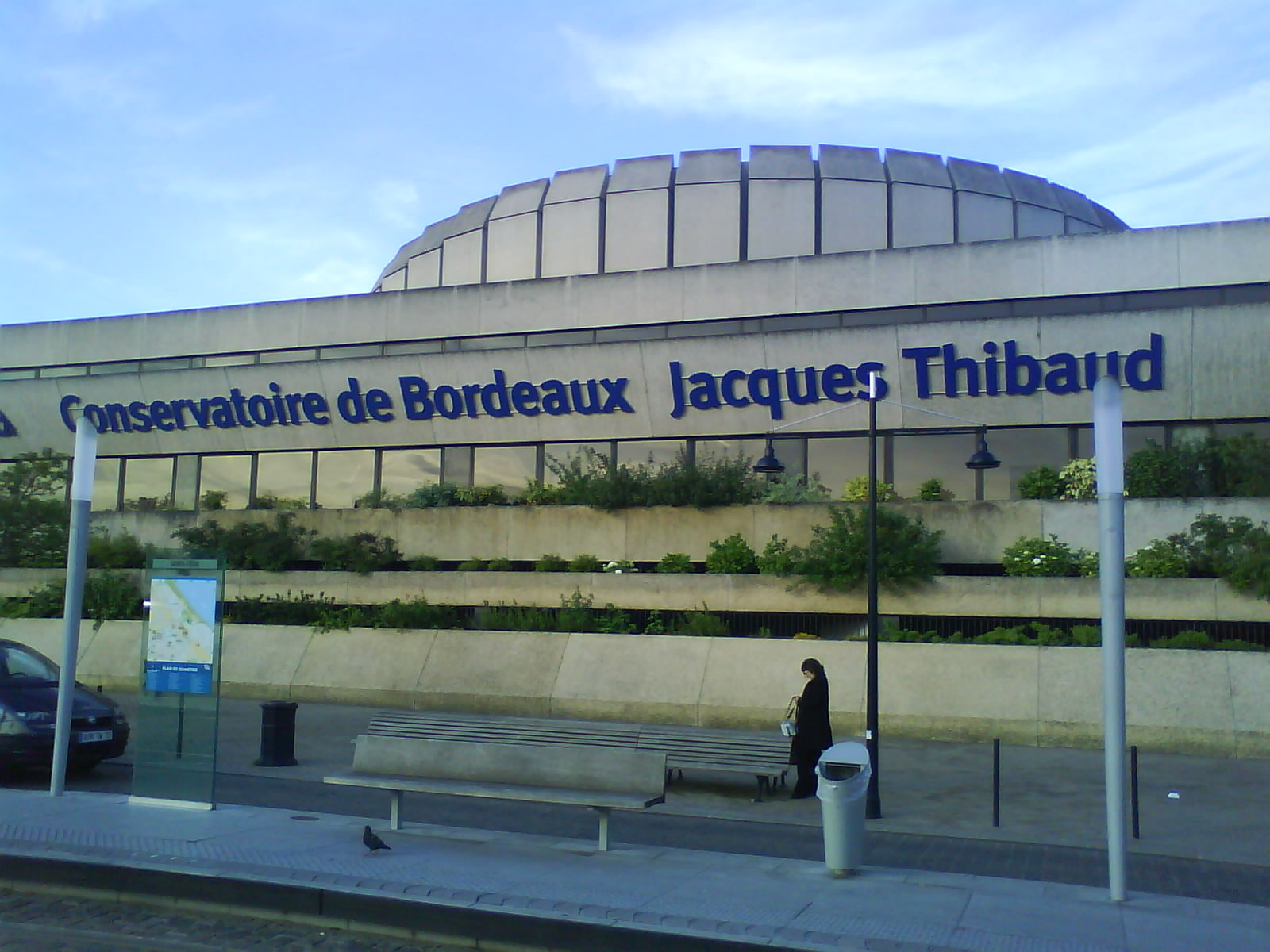
Building of Conservatoire de Bordeaux

The Conservatoire de Bordeaux is an arts conservatory that offers higher education in music, dance and drama in Bordeaux, France.

== Overview ==
It is one of the leading schools in France for singers and saxophonists. Founded in 1821, the school is operated by the French Ministry of Culture.

In November 2025, the school "Howl's Fear", a tapestry inspired by Japanese animator Hayao Miyazaki's film Howl's Moving Castle (2004).

== Notable alumni ==
- Christian Lauba – French composer
- Elia Zaharia – Albanian singer
- Ferdinand de Craywinckel – Spanish-French composer and conductor
- Florian Sempey – French Baritone
- Frédéric Blanc – French composer
- Jérémie Mazenq
- Louis Caimano
- Marcel Merkès – French opera singer
- Mark Engebretson – American composer
- Natalie Dessay – French opera singer
- Sarah Lajus
- Sarah Suco – French singer
- Trent Kynaston – American musician
