= Émile Goué =

French composer

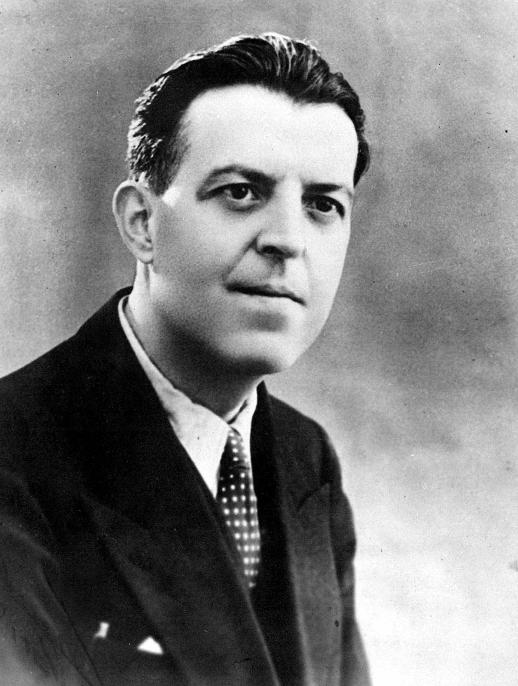
Émile Goué in 1946

Émile Goué (13 June 1904 – 10 October 1946) was a French composer.

== Life ==
Born in Châteauroux (Indre), with a father who was inspector of primary education, a mother who was head teacher of a teacher-training school for young girls in Guéret (Creuse) and four sisters, all of whom became teachers, the path of the young Goué was clear: he was naturally destined for the teaching profession. With a keen intelligence, he 1921, he obtained the two existing baccalaureats: that of elementary mathematics and that of philosophy. he graduated in science at the age of 20. He was appointed professor at Boulogne-sur-Mer three years later. Thereafter, he transferred to Agen in 1924 where he successfully completed the physics and chemistry degree. In 1927, he married Yvonne Burg and they had three children: Michel, Bernard and Françoise. He taught successively at the Lycée Montaigne in Bordeaux and Lycée Buffon in Paris. He taught in so-called "special mathematics" classes (preparation for the Grandes Écoles competitions) and ended his university career in one of the most renowned chairs in higher education, at lycée Louis-le-Grand.

Like Borodin, his scientific and academic career was coupled with regular music practice. Already in Toulouse in 1924, he conducted a youth symphony with a small university orchestra. He furthered his musical studies, which he completed under the direction of Charles Koechlin. Albert Roussel also encouraged him to compose. From 1936 onwards, an intense production began which was only interrupted by the war. Goué was revealed especially with the Psalm XIII (1938) and the Trio (1937). Living permanently in an inner dream, he could seem very dizzy: so he had gone to school one day to teach with two different pairs of shoes. With a very high moral conscience, his personal reactions were always guided by an idealistic point of view.

The Second World War broke out as orchestras and ensembles began to pay attention to his production. Mobilized in 1939 as an artillery lieutenant, taken prisoner in June 1940, he spent five years in the Nienburg, Lower Saxony/Weser Oflag. His visceral need to teach was evident from the first days of captivity through a physics course given to his young classmates to help them prepare for their future exams. At the same time, he organized introductory lectures on the history of music from its origins to the present day, to which were added over the months a course on harmony and counterpoint, a course on fugue, twenty lessons on musical aesthetics and the history of the symphony.

Demonstrating passionate self-denial, he wanted to complete this theoretical teaching and instil in his companions of misfortune a love of music by conducting and commenting on eighteen symphonic concerts whose programs ranged from Franco-Flemish polyphonists to Arthur Honegger. Both the musicians of the orchestra and the singers of the choir were amateurs, with instruments of very poor quality, but Goué's enthusiasm won them all over.

"Captivity" - he confided in 1942, a year of despair and anguish - "removes almost all contact with real life, therefore almost all inner life" [...] "Frequent solitude is necessary to enrich one's inner life, and all solitude is lacking" [...] "The hardest thing is not to be hungry; it is to feel one's spiritual level lower". Very quickly he started composing again, with difficulty at first, then a little more serenely. As with Olivier Messiaen, the war period saw the emergence of masterpieces, revealing an incomparable mastery and artistic maturity: Psalm CXXIII (1942), Prelude, Choral and Fugue (1943), Prehistory (1943), Quintet for piano and strings (1943), Prelude, Aria and Final (1944), Theme and Variations (1945), 3rd String Quartet (1945), etc.

Returning home in May 1945, Goué was unable to carry out his dual activity as a musician and teacher at the same time. Very weakened, he participated in the jury of the agrégation exams, completed the orchestration of his grandiose Inscription on a stele and died on 10 October 1946 at the university sanatorium of Neufmoutiers-en-Brie. He is buried in the cemetery of Guéret, in the Creuse, whose music conservatory has been named after him since 2007.

== Legacy ==
Following in the footsteps of the Frankish school, opposed to the romantic spirit, Goué had a predilection for Bach and Renaissance musicians. He composed Pénombres (1931), an orchestra suite, a Poème Symphonique (1933) and in 1934 a first Symphony as well as a musical action in two acts Wanda, a drama of the sea whose action is located in Saint-Gilles-Croix-de-Vie and which will only be premiered in 1950 in Mulhouse. The colourful dough of his orchestra, as if carved with a chisel, skilfully mixes the instrumental timbres.

Starting from ancient fashions, Goué considered it necessary for the French temperament, by tradition, to assert tonality, but an expanded tonality going without complex to polymodality. A composer of his time, Goué perfectly understood the evolution of musical language and developed his own technique, which he called "chromatic simultaneity", a variant of polymodality on the same tonic. The infinite resources of contrapuntal writing allowed him a multitude of combinations of subjects.

In his quest for perfection, his fascinating theoretical reflections on form extend those of Vincent d'Indy. His temperament as a builder concerned with unity made him prefer the use of a single theme generating the whole work, following Bach's example. Architectural concerns that became more and more imperative in his last opuses (Quintet, 3rd String Quartet, Prelude, Aria and Final...) without stifling lyricism and epic meaning. Because "one must not hide the emptiness of thought under the efflorescence of counterpoint", his style, by successive stripping, reached its conclusion in captivity.

Charles Koechlin rightly characterized him: "He is above all a sensitive, a lyrical man. However, he keeps a constant need for order: a Cartesian whose art does not abandon itself to the fantasy of musical improvisation. The monothematic form that he often likes, is extremely voluntary. It is infinitely serious, often harsh, even strange, sometimes quite austere, sometimes tragic too. But on occasion he achieves real beauty (as in the andante of his Sonata for piano and violin). I have already spoken of the emotion that emanates from a Psalm written in captivity. There is no doubt that such an emotion is also evident in many of his other works. He's not an entertainer. He's not even a skillful charmer. There's often something rough about him. But it is a living being, who loves, who suffers, who has mercy. What he leaves behind is significant enough to deserve to escape oblivion.

An astonishing encounter with Saint Theresa in the pen of the one who had renounced the Catholic religion of his childhood: "I understood that resigning myself to the humble daily tasks puts me in contact with the most essential concerns of Life, and develops in me this gift of generosity that must be cultivated at all costs". Goué remained tormented to the highest degree by the metaphysical problem. His noble and anxious spirituality gives his works a sincere depth and raises the essential questions. Exacerbated by the experience of the camps, this interiority gives Goué's message its accent of authentic originality. Rough universe where man seeks his way by feeling, anxious by his destiny, but sometimes illuminated by a ray of hope. These concerns are in line with our sad actuality: there is some Rouault in this music, exsanguinated faces, surrounded by black, who shout their despair in a burning world.

== Quotes ==
- "More and more I feel drawn to austerity, stripping, nudity and severity of style. We must not hide the emptiness of thought under the efflorescence of the counterpoint. I would like to build works that can help men to believe in Life, in the highest and simplest, the most natural, the most primitive. I think I've already done that.".
- "Music is for me a metaphysical activity, and does not separate from my life".
- "It is as important for me to participate in Life, with its sufferings and joys, as it is to compose music. I would even say that the first activity allows me the second".
- "The divine task of Art is to increase in us the notion of Life".
- "For me, it is the spirit of Bach that matters, religious spirit: believing in Life, and, from this hope, making a lever capable of helping to accomplish one's destiny, such is the positive doctrine, this philosophy of action that is derived from the study of the Cantor's work".
- "Suffering is only desperate if it is sterile."
- "I know that the word conviction still has a pejorative meaning today. This is a salutary reaction against romanticism and, certainly, the most absolute conviction is not enough to generate the work of art. But without conviction, it seems impossible to me to do anything big. This conviction that the artist must bring to his work is none other than the belief in the necessity of what he writes. This belief, this certainty, I have always felt it deeply".

== Main works ==
Pieces for piano

- 1933–1935: Ambiances, suite n° 1
- 1936–1937: Sonate
- 1939: Horizons (pièces descriptives)
- 1942: Ambiances, suite n° 2
- 1943: Prélude, Choral et Fugue
- 1943: Préhistoires
- 1944: Prélude, Aria et Final
- 1945: Thème et Variations

Chamber music

- 1937: Three Pieces for oboe, clarinet and bassoon
- 1937: First String Quartet
- 1941: Second String Quartet
- 1941–1944: Sonata for violon and piano
- 1942: String sextet
- 1942: Duo for violin and cello
- 1943: Quintet for piano and strings
- 1944–1945: Third String sextet

Symphonic works

- 1933: Poème symphonique
- 1925–1937: Première Symphonie "classique", in G minor
- 1943: Second Symphony, with main violin, in A
- 1943: Esquisse pour un paysage vu du Mont Coudreau
- 1944: Macbeth
- 1946: Esquisse pour une inscription sur une stèle

Lyrical works

- 1934: Wanda
- 1938: Psaume XIII
- 1940: Psaume CXXIII

Melodies

- 1940: Ballade
- 1942–1943: Trois Mélodies pour voix et quatuor à cordes
- 1945: Deux Mélodies

== Discography ==
- Mélodies (world premiere recording) by Christel Plancq, soprano, Damien Top, tenor, Jean-Jacques Cubaynes, bass, Éric Hénon, piano, collection du Festival international Albert-Roussel, 2006, Recital SyPr 054
- String quartet (world premiere recording) by the César Franck Quartet, chamber music, volume 1, collection du Festival international Albert-Roussel, 2007, Recital RCP067
- Sonata for violin and piano, String Quartet No 3 (world premiere recording) by Alfred Loewenguth, violin, Françoise Doreau, piano, Loewenguth Quartet, collection du Festival international Albert-Roussel, 2008, Azur Classical AZC 081
- Œuvres pour piano, volume 1, (world premiere recording) by Samuel Ternoy, collection du Festival International Albert-Roussel, 2009, Azur Classical AZC 082
- Œuvres pour piano, volume 2, (world premiere recording) by Diane Andersen, collection du Festival International Albert-Roussel, 2011, Azur Classical AZC 083
- Quintet for strings and piano, Trio with piano, Three pieces for quartet (world premiere recording) by the Joachim Quartet and Olivier Chauzu, Chamber music, volume 2, collection du Festival international Albert-Roussel, 2012, Azur Classical AZC 100
- Mélodies avec quatuor, Fleurs mortes, Duo, Trio, Sextuor à cordes (world premiere recording) by Damien Top, tenor and the musicians of the MET Orchestra, Chamber music, volume 3, collection du Festival international Albert-Roussel, 2012, Azur Classical AZC 120
- Symphonie n°2, Ballade sur un poème d'Emily Brontë Orchestre Radio Symphonique de Paris, Tony Aubin - Marie Béronita, soprano, Krettly Quartet, Louis de Froment, recordings INA 1949 and 1958, collection du Festival international Albert-Roussel, 2016, Azur Classical AZC 135

== Bibliography ==
- Philippe Gordien and Bernard Goué, Émile Goué, compositeur mort pour la France, Les Amis d'Émile Goué, 1998
- Émile Goué, Cours d'Esthétique musicale (1943), Les Amis d'Émile Goué, 1998
- Émile Goué, Éléments fondamentaux d'écriture musicale, Les Amis d'Émile Goué, 2001
- Damien Top, Émile Goué, un alchimiste des sons, Politique Magazine, No 20, June 2004
- Bernard Goué, Émile Goué, compositeur : Influence de la Creuse sur son œuvre, Mémoires de la Société des Sciences naturelles et archéologiques de la Creuse, No 50, 2004
- Philippe Gonin, Koechlin pédagogue. Son influence sur la pensée esthétique d'Émile Goué, Charles Koechlin, compositeur et humaniste, coord. Philippe Cathé, Sylvie Douche, Michel Duchesneau, Librairie philosophique J. Vrin, 2011
- Damien Top, Un aperçu de la polytonalité chez Émile Goué, Polytonalités, under the direction of Philippe Malhaire, L'Harmattan, 2011
- Damien Top, Émile Goué, biography, Bleu-Nuit, 2012
- Bruno Giner, Survivre et mourir en musique dans les camps nazis, Paris, Berg International Éditeurs, 2011, Third part, chapter 4
- Émile Goué. Chaînon manquant de la musique française, under the direction of Philippe Malhaire, Paris, L'Harmattan, series L'Univers musical, 2014, 272 p.
- Philippe Gordien, assisted by Bernard Goué, Commentaires, analyses et conseils d'interprétation d'œuvres d'Émile Goué, texts gathered, edited, presented and annotated by Philippe Malhaire, Paris, Les Amis d'Emile Goué, April 2015, 140 p.
- Émile Goué, Demain, je t'écrirai en majeur, correspondence, Paris, L'Harmattan, series Musiques en question(s), 2016, 382 p.
