= Michel Strauss =

French cellist (born 1951)

Michel Strauss (born 1951) is a French cellist.

Strauss was born in Paris. He was educated by Paul Tortelier and Maurice Gendron at the Conservatoire de Paris, where he won first prizes in cello and in chamber music, before continuing his studies at Yale University with Aldo Parisot. In 1980, he was appointed principal solo cello of the Orchestre Philharmonique de Radio France and began teaching his own regular cello class at the Paris Conservatoire in 1987. He has also taught in the Netherlands and sat on the juries on many international music competitions.

Strauss has collaborated with many important contemporary classical composers, including Maurice Béjart, Luciano Berio, Pierre Boulez, Henri Dutilleux, Philippe Hersant, and Krzysztof Penderecki, and is the dedicatee of a number of their works. He has also worked for cinema with Jean-Luc Godard and for musical theatre in Avignon.

As a chamber musician, Strauss has performed with such artists as pianists Jean-Claude Pennetier, Georges Pludermacher and Henriette Puig-Roget; violinists Gérard Jarry, Tibor Varga, and Sandor Vegh; violists Gérard Caussé, Serge Collot, and Bruno Pasquier; as well as fellow cellist and former teacher Aldo Parisot.

He is the founder and artistic director of the Giverny Chamber Music Festival.
