= David Berger =

David Berger may refer to:

- David Berger (attorney), deputy district attorney, Los Angeles, California
- David Berger (Canadian politician) (born 1950), former member of Canada's Parliament and ambassador to Israel
- David Berger (historian) (born 1943), Professor and Dean of Jewish Studies at Yeshiva University, rabbi and author
- David Berger (Wisconsin politician) (born 1946), former Wisconsin State Senator and State Assemblyman
- David Berger (weightlifter) (1944–1972), American-Israeli Olympic athlete killed in the Munich massacre
- David Berger (theologian) (born 1968), German neo-thomist, former professor of the Pontifical Academy of St. Thomas Aquinas (Vatican)
- David H. Berger (born 1959), U.S. Marine Corps general
- David Berger, German musician previously in the band Topictoday
- David Berger, American jazz musician who has played in The Hot Sardines

== See also ==
- Berger (disambiguation)
