= Régis Pasquier =

French violinist

- Born: October 12, 1945 (age 81); Fontainebleau, France
- Origin: French
- Genre: Classical music
- Occupations: Violinist, Professor
- Instrument: Violin
- Years active: 1960–present
- Awards: Charles Cros Prize (1988); Soloist of the Year – Victoires de la Musique (1991)

Régis Pasquier (born 12 October 1945) is a French violinist from a family of musicians. His father Pierre Pasquier (1902–1986), a violist and his uncles Jean (1903), a violinist, and Étienne (1905–1997), a cellist, had founded a string trio, the Trio Pasquier. His brother Bruno Pasquier is a violist.

== Biography ==
Born in Fontainebleau, Régis Pasquier was a student of Zino Francescatti, with whom he latter recorded the Concerto for Two Violins by J. S. Bach. In 1958, he won the First Prizes in violin and chamber music at the Conservatoire de Paris. From 1977 to 1986, he was principal violin of the Orchestre National de France. In 1985, he was appointed professor of violin and chamber music at the Conservatoire de Paris, where he taught until 2011.

Since 1960, he has toured extensively abroad. With his brother Bruno (violist and conductor) and cellist Roland Pidoux, he was for a while a member of a sought-after trio, reviving the Trio Pasquier.

In 1988, he received the Charles Cros Prize, and in 1991 the title of "Soloist of the year" at the Victoires de la Musique.

The virtuoso often performs in his village of Montréal in Burgundy.

== Recordings ==
- J. S. Bach Sonatas and Partitas for Violin Solo
- Saint-Saëns: The Carnival of the Animals (1978)
- Paganini: 24 Caprices (1991)
- Mozart: complete Violin Concertos (1994)
- Sibelius: Violin Concerto (1995)
- Beethoven: Violin Sonatas, with Jean-Claude Pennetier (1997)
- Brahms: String Sextet No. 1, with Raphaël Oleg (violin), Bruno Pasquier (viola), Jean Dupouy (viola), Roland Pidoux (cello) and Étienne Péclard (cello), Harmonia mundi (1982)
- Maurice Ravel: Chamber music (2004)
- Rachmaninoff: Trios élégiaques, with the Pennetier-Pasquier-Pidoux Trio (2008)
- Beethoven: Violin Concerto, Saphir Production (2002)
- Tchaikovsky: Violin Concerto, Saphir Production (2003)
- Schubert: Trout Quintet, with Pierre-Henri Xuereb, Luc Tooten, Ludo Joly, Stéphane De May, and Stéphanie Salmin,. Pavane Records ADW7603 (2024)
