= Olivier Chauzu =

Franco-Spanish classical pianist

Olivier Chauzu (born 18 December 1963) is a Franco-Spanish classical pianist.

== Biography ==
Chauzu studied at the Conservatoire à rayonnement régional de Bordeaux, then at the Conservatoire de Paris in Gabriel Tacchino's class, then Théodore Paraskivesco's, as well as Jean-Claude Pennetier's and Christian Ivaldi's. After he won his two first prizes (piano and chamber music), he followed the cycle of perfection, worked with Dimitri Bashkirov, Leon Fleisher and began to perform in concerts in France and abroad. He went to Canada to study at the Banff Center with György Sebők, Paul Badura-Skoda, Anton Kuerti. The international Yvonne Lefébure competition followed by a prize at the Maria Canals International Competition immediately made him known as a performer of Debussy ("Much better than a good pianist, a real musician"), wrote Gérard Gefen in La Lettre du musicien nº 93).

He obtained a doctorate in Spanish literature from the University of Pau and Pays de l'Adour, where he participated in the Romance Language Laboratory, and frequently gave Enrique Granados' Goyescas and Isaac Albéniz's suite Iberia in concert, for which he won the Diapason d'or. He then recorded Paul Dukas's complete music for piano, including the grand sonata in E-flat minor, Robert Schumann's (Humoresque, Davidsbündlertänze and Toccata) festival, then a recording dedicated to Beethoven's sonatas. Committed to contemporary creation, he also records Philippe Forget's cinq regards pour piano and Lucien Guérinel's trios. In Toronto (Canada), he premiered Fragments de soleil by Philippe Forget, as well as Pablo Neruda's poems by Omar Daniel.

He has played with the Calgary Philharmonic Orchestra, the Mexico City Philharmonic Orchestra with Marco Parisotto, the Saint Petersburg Philharmonic Orchestra, the Orchestre symphonique et lyrique de Nancy with Jérôme Kaltenbach, the Capella Istropolitana of Bratislava with Christian Benda, with Michel Tabachnik, the Orchestre régional Bayonne-Côte basque and performed with Raphaël Perraud, Pierre Amoyal, Staffan Mårtensson, Roland Daugareil, Nicholas Angelich, François Leleux, Jean-Pierre Armengaud, with whom he signed the complete work for four hands by Debussy for the Naxos label. He travels the world, Spain, France, Portugal, Czech Republic, Sweden, Germany, America, Middle, and Far East.

== Discography ==
- Isaac Albéniz, Iberia (2CD Calliope CAL 9398.9) OCLC 703227029
- Paul Dukas' Complete work for piano: Piano Sonata, Variations Interlude et Finale, Prélude élégiaque, La plainte, au loin, du faune (Calliope).
- Schumann's Toccata, Davidsbündlertänze, Humoreske (Calliope).
- Beethoven's sonata Op 101 and 106 (Calliope).
- Schumann's piano sonatas (2013, Azur Classical) OCLC 1010379443
- Samazeuilh's work for piano (21–23 February 2014, Grand Piano) OCLC 905239537
- Debussy, Music for piano with four hands - with Jean-Pierre Armengaud (March/July 2012, Naxos 8.572979).
- Chausson and Cras, Trios for piano, violin, cello - Trio des Aulnes: Jean-François Corvaisier, violin; Laurent Lagarde, cello; Olivier Chauzu, piano (21-24 February 1998, Euromuses) OCLC 44856170
- Mendelssohn's Trios for piano, violin, cello - Trio des Aulnes (Euromuses)
- Guérinel's Trios nº1 and 2 (Integral Classic). OCLC 822816728
- Forget's chamber music: Canaa et Cinq regards pour piano (27 June 2008, Anima Records ANM/090600001) OCLC 762384789
- Schumann's Variations on a theme by Beethoven, Geistervariationen, Variations on a theme by Schubert (15 May 2015, Naxos 8.573540).
- Kalomíris's works for piano (2-3 November 2016, Grand Piano). OCLC 1015234341
