= Jacques Borsarello =

French classical violist

Jacques Borsarello (born 1951) is a French classical violist.

== Life ==
Born in Toulon, Borsarello was a student of Serge Collot and Bruno Pasquier at the Conservatoire de Paris. A member of the Loewenguth Quartet for four years, he was a member of the Razumowsky Quartet, before founding the String Trio Borsarello with his brothers Frédéric (cello) and Jean-Luc.

He is the founder of the musical season Alto en Béarn, which offers a training course in viola and chamber music as part of an art exhibition around the painter Raymond Grant Baron de Longueuil, as well as a series of concerts in the city of Navarrenx.

He publishes numerous educational scores for the Van de Velde publishing house, as well as collections of short stories on the profession of musician (Réaltor B, chronique d'un musicien entre deux siècles and Concert champêtre at Éditions Symétrie, À part la musique...). In 2016 he published a third collection "Premier concert" at Éditions Abordables.

Holder of the certificat d'aptitude, he has been professor of viola at the Conservatoire à rayonnement régional de Versailles since 1996.
