= Ludwig Quartet =

French string quartet ensemble

The Ludwig Quartet is a French string quartet ensemble founded in 1985 and leading an international career. It is composed of Sébastien Surel (first violin), Manuel Doutrelant (second violon), Violaine Despeyroux (viola) and Anne Copéry (violoncello).

== History ==
The members of the Ludwig Quartet are all former students of the Conservatoire de Paris.

In the 1990s, the Ludwig Quartet received advice from the conductor Sergiu Celibidache, and worked with the Berg, Tokyo, Amadeus, LaSalle and Kolish Quartets.

The Ludwig Quartet has won awards in numerous international competitions: Menuhin Foundation, Portsmouth, Arthur Honegger, Vittorio Gui of Florence... It was invited to spend a year of residency at Yale University (1988) and then solicited to become "Quatuor en Résidence" at the Conservatoire de Paris (1991) for a period of three years.

The Ludwig Quartet was invited to give concerts, performing in Paris in particular (Théâtre des Champs-Élysées, Opéra Comique, Collège des Bernardins, Cité de la musique, Musée d'Orsay, Théâtre de La Madeleine), London (Wigmore Hall), New-York (Merkin Concert Hall), Taipei (National Theatre), Shanghai (National Theatre), Tokyo, Vancouver, Montréal, Toronto, Nouméa, Marrakech, Brussels and Louvain...

Over time, a demanding repertoire is built up, giving way to Haydn, Beethoven, Schubert, Brahms, Mendelssohn, Schumann, Turina, Janáček, Borodin, Shostakovich, Chausson, Debussy, Ravel, Franck, Alban Berg, Dutilleux, Webern, Ligeti, Fauré, Magnard, Lekeu, Honegger, Jehan Alain, Albeniz, Piazzolla... The Ludwig Quartet also participates in the premieres of contemporary works composed by Alain Louvier, Michaël Lévinas, Philippe Hersant, Thierry Escaich and Jean-François Zygel. In 2012, Ivan Jevtić's Quartet No. 4 in E minor premiered at the Festival international Albert-Roussel before being performed at the Festival Nimus in Serbia.

The Ludwig Quartet has sometimes joined other musicians for quintet concerts: François-René Duchâble, Abdel Rahman El Bacha, Bertrand Chamayou, Brigitte Engerer, Bruno Pasquier, Michael Lévinas, Marie-Josèphe Jude, Emmanuelle Bertrand, Dmitri Berlinsky...

The Ludwig Quartet is also interested in the intersection of artistic disciplines and the decompartmentalization of classical music, by producing shows that feature personalities from other territories: actors Marie-Christine Barrault, Fanny Cottençon, Michel Bouquet, Didier Sandre, François Marthouret, Jean-François Balmer, Jean-Claude Drouot, Nicolas Vaude, dancer Jean Guizerix, and astro-physicist Hubert Reeves.

The founding members of the Ludwig Quartet are Chevaliers des Arts et Lettres.

== Awards ==
The discography of the Ludwig Quartet has been rewarded:

- Grand Prix du Disque Lyrique (1992),
- Grand Prix de l'Académie du Disque Français et Grand Prix International du Disque of the Académie Charles-Cros (1993) for the complete quartets by Arthur Honegger
- Grand Prize for Chamber Music of the Midem in Cannes (1999) "Cannes Classical Awards", for his interpretation of Chausson's quartet and Franck's piano quintet with Michaël Levinas.

== Discography ==
- Dmitri Shostakovich - Quartets n° 1 - 3 - 8 - 2011 - (Calliope - CAL 1102)
- Joseph Haydn's - The Seven Last Words of Christ - Reissue 2009 - (CSM 0007)
- Johannes Brahms - Quartets No. 1 and 2 - (Naxos 8.554271)
- Johannes Brahms - Quartet No. 3 and Quintet with clarinet - (Naxos 8.554601)
- Johannes Brahms - String Quintets - (Naxos 8.553635)
- César Franck - Quintet with piano - Ernest Chausson Quartet Opus 35 - (Naxos 8.553645)
- Berg-Dutilleux-Webern - (Timpani 1C1005)
- Honegger - Complete Quartets - (Timpani C 1011)
- Debussy-Ravel - (EMS AAOC 93812)
- Jehan Alain - Quintet - Sextet (Arion 68321)
- Jehan Alain - Messe modale - (SISYPHE004 3760002130118 - 2)
- Jehan Alain - Jehan Alain retrouvé - (Arion) - Diapason d'or of the year 2005
- Ernest Chausson - Les mélodies with Billy Eidi - piano, Sandrine Piau (soprano), Brigitte Balleys (mezzo-soprano) - Jean-François Gardeil - (baritone). (Timpani 2C2132)
- Michaël Levinas - Quintet with two violas with Gérard Caussé
- Thierry Escaich - "Chorus" - with Florent Héau (clarinet), Bertrand Chamayou (piano).
