= Loewenguth Quartet =

Music ensemble led by Alfred Loewenguth

The Loewenguth Quartet was a string quartet music ensemble led by the French violinist Alfred Loewenguth. It was particularly famous for performances of classical repertoire such as Beethoven, Mozart and Haydn quartets, and was active from the 1930s to the 1970s.

== Personnel ==
The founding line-up of the Loewenguth Quartet was:

- 1st violin: Alfred Loewenguth
- 2nd violin: Maurice Fuéri
- Viola: J. George; later, Louis Martini.
- Cello: Pierre Basseux.

From the early 1960s the desks were occupied thus:

- 1st violin: Alfred Loewenguth (1929–1983)
- 2nd violin: Jacques Gotkovsky (before 1963-1967); Jean-Pierre Sabouret (1967–1975); Philippe Langlois (1976–1983).
- Viola: Roger Roche; Jean-Claude De Waele; Jacques Borsarello (1979–1983)
- Cello: Roger Loewenguth (to 1983). (brother of Alfred)

The quartet was dissolved in 1983 at the death of the founder.

== Origins ==
Alfred Loewenguth was born in Paris in 1911. He formed his first string quartet in 1929, but appeared in public as a violinist first in 1936.

Loewenguth began to study the violin at 8 years old, and had his first pupil when he was 12. At 16, he entered the Conservatoire National de Paris, and he set up his own Violin School when he was 17. At 19 he won the first prize at the Conservatoire, and principal medals for chamber music and solfeggio. For chamber music he was a pupil of André Tourret and Jean Roger-Ducasse. In 1959 he founded the Alfred Loewenguth Youth Orchestras, and in 1969 he set up the Music Festival of the Orangerie de Sceaux. He both founded and directed the Conservatoire of the 9th arrondissement of Paris, and taught at the Conservatoire of Stuttgart, at the Schola Cantorum de Paris, and at the Académie Internationale at Nice. Although he devoted the core of his musical work to teaching and to chamber music - with his quartet or in duo (for more than fifty years with the pianist Françoise Doreau), he also had a career as soloist. The cinematographer Benoît Jacquot devoted a documentary called "Enfance Musique" to him in 1979.

The Loewenguth Quartet appearances in Southern Africa were hugely successful, and they completed three tours, in 1955, 56, and 64.

Alfred Loewenguth died in 1983.

The quartet performed the complete quartets of Beethoven in a series of 6 concerts over three consecutive weekends in November 1948 in New York. On 12 November 1948 they gave the premiere of the 6th quartet, op. 64 (1947) of Egon Wellesz at the Library of Congress. In the same year they also performed the complete Beethoven series for the Casavant Society in Montreal. The quartet performed Priaulx Rainier's string quartet at the Edinburgh Festival in 1949.

== Recordings ==
The Loewenguth Quartet made many recordings on 78 rpm and 33 rpm discs, for various labels including Deutsche Grammofon (and Archiv), Vox, Philips, Westminster, Les Discophiles Français, Club National du Disque and some smaller French and American labels.

- Beethoven: Op 18 no 4 (1947) & No 16 (1946).
- Beethoven: Complete Quartets (Vox Box SVBX 543/4/5). (published 1962?)
- Mozart: Quartets K387 & K428 (1951), K458 (DGG 18315) (1950) also (Decca 10", DL 7517), K465 (c.1945) (another version live 1972), Clarinet quintet K581 (live 1972 with Georgina Dobrée). (DOREMI reissue vol 1)
- Haydn: Quartets op 64 no 5 (DGG 18315), op 76 no 2 and 74 no 3 (Oriole Eurodisc SMG 20066). (DOREMI reissue vol 1)
- Hugo Wolf: Italienische Serenade. (Opera label)
- Jean Françaix: Quatuor à cordes; Juvénalia. (Opera label)
- Roussel: String Quartet in D major op 45. (1953).(Decca DL 4026)
- Claude Debussy: String quartet op 10 (DGG 18312) (Club National du Disque CND 75)
- Maurice Ravel: String quartet in F (DGG 18312) (Club National du Disque CND 75)
- Gabriel Fauré: Quartet (and Roussel quartet), (Vox TV34014S). Complete Chamber Music, (VOX QSVBX 5152).
- César Franck: Quartet in D major.
- Émile Goué: Third quartet, Sonata for piano and violin (with Doreau).(Azur Classical CD AZC 081)
- J. S. Bach: The Art of Fugue - Contrapunctus 9. (1945)
- Jacques Ibert: String Quartet. (1945)
- Franz Schubert: String Quartet No.14 "Der Tod und Das Mädchen". (Les Discophiles Francais DF 203).(1956)
- Schubert: No.12 'Quartettsatz'. (Discophiles Francais DF 203).(1956)
- Franz Schubert: String Quintet D. 956 * with Roger Loewenguth, cello. (Les Discophiles Francais DF 214).(1958)
- Jean Roger-Ducasse: String quartet no 2.
- Sergei Prokofiev: 2nd Quartet (& Roussel Quartet) (DGG). (1955)
- Pierre Vachon: Quartets Op 11 no 1, 5. (DGG Archiv SAPM 198033)
- Nicolas Dalayrac: Quartets Op 7 no 3, op. 1 no 3 (5). (Archiv SAPM 198033)
