= Michael Denhoff =

German composer and cellist

Michael Denhoff (born 25 April 1955 in Ahaus) is a German composer and cellist.

== Life ==
Denhoff has lived and worked in Bonn since 1982. He studied at the Hochschule für Musik und Tanz Köln, where his teachers included Günter Bialas and Hans Werner Henze (composition), Siegfried Palm and Erling Blöndal Bengtsson (cello) and the Amadeus Quartet (chamber music). As a composer and chamber musician, he occupied various teaching posts, including a lectureship in composition at the University of Mainz (1984–85) and a guest professorship at the National Conservatory of Hanoi (1997–99). From 1985 to 1992 he also conducted the Akademische Orchester Bonn, which he founded. As a cellist, he formed the Denhoff Piano Trio with his brother Johannes (violin) and the pianist Richard Braun. Since 1992, he has been a member of the Ludwig Quartet of Bonn, and he also works closely with the pianist Birgitta Wollenweber. As a composer, he has won several prizes and distinctions, including the Bernd Alois Zimmermann Prize (1986) and the Annette von Droste-Hülshoff Prize (1989).

Denhoff's music shows the influence of poetry and the visual arts. Several of his orchestral and chamber works have been inspired by lyrics and paintings. Thus, there are instrumental works and cycles based on pictures by Marc Chagall, Paul Klee, Wassily Kandinsky, Albrecht Dürer and especially Francisco Goya (El sueño de la razon produce monstruos, 1982; Desastres de la guerra, 1983; Los disparates, 1988). The literary figures who have most left their mark on his music are Ranier Maria Rilke, Paul Celan, Samuel Beckett and Stéphane Mallarmé. Other works characteristic of his compositional thought include cycles in the form of 'musical diaries' (Klangtagebuch, 1984; Hebdomadaire, 1990). The most significant of these works is the piano quintet Hauptweg und Nebenwege (1998), which lasts nearly three hours. This piece gathers together the essential aspects of his music, their relationship to musical tradition, and also the influences of literature and the visual arts.

Denhoff's compositional vocabulary shows evidence of a sensitive feeling for harmony and form, whose roots are to be found in composers such as Bernd Alois Zimmermann, Olivier Messiaen, Morton Feldman and György Kurtág.

CDs featuring Denhoff's works are available on the WERGO, Col Legno and Cybele labels.

== Selected works ==
=== Music theatre ===
- DER PELIKAN – Kammeroper nach Strindberg op. 64

=== Oratorios ===
- TRAUMBUCH EINES GEFANGENEN für Bariton, Sprecher, Chor und Orchester op. 51
- IN UNUM DEUM – Credo für Sopran, Bariton, Chor, Orgel und kleines Orchester op. 93
- MAGNIFICAT für Chor mit zwei Soloquartetten, Saxophonquartett und vier Schlagzeuger op. 98

=== Choral music ===
- VOZ MIA, CANTA, CANTA op. 37 Liederzyklus nach Gedichten von Juan Ramón Jiménez
- THE DIMENSION OF STILLNESS op. 58
- CREDO op. 93a

=== Vocal music ===
- WIE EINE LINIE DUNKELBLAUEN SCHWEIGENS op. 80 - Sieben Gesänge nach Gedichten von Selma Meerbaum-Eisinger für Mezzosopran und Akkordeon
- SILENCE, ET PUIS op. 101 - Fragmente nach letzten Notaten von Marguerite Duras für Altstimme und Viola

=== Orchestral music ===
- MELANCOLIA - Annäherungen an einen Kupferstich von Dürer op. 26
- EINSAMKEIT - in memoriam W. Buchebner op. 33
- DESASTRES DE LA GUERRA – Orchesterbilder nach Goya op. 36
- NACHTBILD (Mahler-Momente) op. 57
- INNENRÄUME…ERINNERND op. 71
- MATCH für Saxophonorchester und gr. Trommel op. 90

=== Concertos ===
- UMBRAE - in memoriam B. A. Zimmermann - für Violine, Violoncello und Orchester op. 13
- OMAGGIO für Violine, Oboe und Orchester op. 40
- REMARKS AND REVIEWS für Saxophonquartett und Orchester op. 68

=== Chamber music ===
- 9 String Quartets (Opp. 1, 19, 30, 55, 66a, 70, 73, 79, 83a)
- 5 Piano Trios (Opp. 7, 27, 74-1, 74-2, 83b)
- 4 Saxophone Quartets ("gegen-sätze" Op.39, "svolgimenti" Op.46, "pnoxoud" Op.59, Fünf geistliche Gesänge Op.98a)
- Moment Musical for Viola and Piano (1973)
- Champs de Mars, Inventions after Marc Chagall for Viola and Piano, Op.9 (1975)
- Los Disparates, Sketches after Goya for Viola, Cello and Double Bass, Op.54 (1988)
- Two Once So One for String Quartet, Viola and Cello, Op.66 (1992)
- Mallarmé-Zyklus, 12 Quartets for 12 Musicians, Op.75 (1995–1996)
- Tenebrae for Viola and Piano, Op.82 (1997)
- Hauptweg und Nebenwege, Aufzeichnungen für Streichquartett und Klavier, Op.83 (1998)
- To and Fro in Shadow, "Nebenweg IV" for Viola and Piano, Op.83d (1998–1999)
- Igitur, Lesart für Kammerensemble, Op.85 (1998)
- Sounds and Shadows for Piano, String Quartet and Viola (or Clarinet), Op.86 (1999)
- ...Ins Ungewisse... (Luigi Nono In Memoriam) for Violin and Double Bass, Op.97 (2004)
- ...Ouvert..., Meditation für variable Besetzung, Op.99 (2005)
- Maramba (zur Erinnerung an Paula Köhlmeier) for Flute (also Bass Flute) and Celesta, Op.100 (2005)
- Silence, et puis for Alto Voice and Viola, Op.101 (2006)
- Rue Sedaine, 11 P.M. for Ensemble, Op.104 (2007)
- Zwei Stücke (Two Pieces) for Viola and Cello (2007)

=== Solo works ===
- NACHTFANTASIEN (zu Rilke-Gedichten) für Gitarre op. 31
- AUS TIEFER NOT - Anrufung für Orgel op. 41
- ATEMWENDE – Klavierzyklus nach Paul Celan op. 49, 1-7
- MONOLOGE I – V für fünf Solisten op. 50, 1-5
- HEBDOMADAIRE – 52 Stücke vom Jahr für einen Pianisten op. 62
- SKULPTUREN I – V für Klavier op. 76, 1-5
- INVENTIONEN I – XII für Player-Piano op. 88, 1-12
- ...AL NIENTE... für Klavier op. 95
- NACHTSCHATTENGEWÄCHSE - neun Stücke für Klavier op. 96

== Writings ==
- Stille und Umkehr - Betrachtungen zum Phänomen Zeit, in: MusikTexte, Heft 24 (1988), S. 27 - 38
- Rituel von Pierre Boulez - Anmerkungen zur Raum- und Zeitkonzeption, in: Festschrift zum 60. Geburtstag von Prof. Dr. Emil Platen, Bonn (1985), S. 208 - 219
- Max Reger. Ein für die Musik des 20. Jahrhunderts zu Recht unterschätzter Komponist?! Eine Musikbefragung, in: REGER-STUDIEN 4, Breitkopf & Härtel (1989), S. 105 – 124, 233 – 253
- Vom Bild-Klang zum Klang-Bild - zum Verhältnis von Bild und Musik in meinen Stücken, in: NZfM 1993 / 6, S. 14 - 19

== Literature ==
- Schäfer, Thomas (1999). "Michael Denhoffs "Nachtbild": Nähe als Hindernis". Modellfall Mahler : kompositorische Rezeption in zeitgenössischer Musik (in German). München: W. Fink Verlag. ISBN 3-7705-3393-3. OCLC 41615834.
