= Bill Finegan =

American jazz bandleader, pianist, arranger and composer (1917–2008)

William James Finegan (April 3, 1917 – June 4, 2008) was an American jazz bandleader, pianist, arranger, and composer. He was an arranger in the Glenn Miller Orchestra in the late 1930s and early 1940s.

== Life and career ==
Born in Newark, New Jersey, United States, Finegan grew up in a household full of piano players. While growing up in Rumson, New Jersey, he attended Rumson-Fair Haven High School and taught orchestration to schoolmate Nelson Riddle, and he studied piano with Elizabeth Connelly, piano and musicianship with flautist/alto saxophonist Rudolph John Winthrop (1883–1959), himself a student of Engelbert Humperdinck. He spent time studying at the Paris Conservatory, and had his first professional experience leading his own piano trio. Finegan was offered a job as a staff arranger for Glenn Miller after Tommy Dorsey bought a copy of his "Lonesome Road" and recommended him; he remained with Miller until 1942, and arranged such hits as "Little Brown Jug", "Sunrise Serenade", "Song of the Volga Boatmen", Stardust, A Nightingale Sang in Berkley Square and "Jingle Bells", arranged in collaboration with Glenn Miller. Finegan also arranged music for films in which the band appeared, such as Sun Valley Serenade (1941) and Orchestra Wives (1942). He then worked off and on for Tommy Dorsey from 1942 to 1952, including on the 1947 film The Fabulous Dorseys.

After the demise of Miller's orchestra in 1942, Finegan joined Horace Heidt, writing "some pieces for the band that immediately sent its musical stock skyward."

In 1947-48 Finegan studied with Stefan Wolpe in New York City, and lived in Europe from 1948-1950 where he studied with Darius Milhaud and Valérie Soudères, a pianist and composer who premiered Bartók's 3rd Piano Concerto in Paris. After returning to the United States, in 1952, Finegan and Eddie Sauter (whom Finegan had met in 1939) formed an ensemble, the Sauter-Finegan Orchestra, which remained active until 1957. His arrangement of "Doodletown Fifers" was one of the Sauter-Finegan Orchestra's best-known originals. Following this collaboration, Finegan found work in advertising, writing music for commercials. In the 1970s, he arranged for the Glenn Miller Orchestra and Mel Lewis's orchestra. He taught jazz at the University of Bridgeport in the 1980s. He wrote arrangements for cornetist Warren Vaché (with the Scottish String Ensemble) in 2004, and the vocal group Chanticleer until his death in 2008.

== Compositions ==
He composed and/or arranged "Down For The Count", "Conversation Piece", "Are Ya Jumpin' Jack?", recorded by Glenn Miller and his Orchestra, "Doodletown Fifers", "Tweedle Dee and Tweedle Dum", "Doodletown Races", "Yankee Doodletown", "Pussy Willow", "Bingo, Bango, Boffo", "Hollywood Hat", "Piccalilli Dilly", "Church Mouse", "Alright Already", "Texas Tex", recorded by Tex Beneke and the Glenn Miller Orchestra in 1946, "Child's Play", and "Tail End Charlie" which was released by Glenn Miller and his AAFTC Orchestra as a V-Disc, no. 144A, in March, 1944.

== Other professional activities ==
Finegan taught a class in arranging at Housatonic Community College in 1974.

== Personal life ==
Finegan's first wife was Kay Finegan. They divorced in the early 1960s. Finegan later married to Rosemary O Reilly Finegan. They had a son James Finegan and a daughter Helen (Finegan) Dzujna.

== Death ==
Bill Finegan died on Wednesday, June 4, 2008, in Bridgeport, Connecticut at the age 91. The cause of death was pneumonia.

== Sauter-Finegan Orchestra discography ==
- Moonlight On The Ganges/April In Paris (7") RCA Victor 1952
- Rain/Stop! Sit Down! Relax! Think! (7") RCA Victor 1952
- Doodletown Fifers/Azure-Té (Paris Blues) (7") RCA Victor 1952
- Now That I'm In Love/Yankee Doodletown (7", Promo) RCA Victor 1953
- Where's Ace/Hit The Road To Dreamland (7") RCA Victor 1954
- Of Thee I Sing/Pale Moon (7") RCA Victor 1954
- Concert Jazz (12") RCA Victor 1955
- Directions In Music (CD Compilation) BMG Music 1989
- Doodletown Fifers/Moonlight On The Ganges (7")

== See also ==
- List of jazz arrangers

== Bibliography ==
- Leonard Feather and Ira Gitler. The Biographical Encyclopedia of Jazz. Oxford, 1999, p. 225.
