= Via Nova Quartet =

The Via Nova Quartet is a French string quartet ensemble established in 1968.

== History ==
Founded in 1968 by musicians who had met at the Cyrne Arte festival (Corsica) four years earlier, it first took the festival's name. Its repertoire ranges from classical composers to contemporary classical music. It was subsidized in 1976 by the French Ministry of Culture.

== Members ==
- Jean Mouillère, first violin
- Jean-Pierre Sabouret (1968, then from 1975), Hervé le Floch (1968-1971), Alain Moglia (1971-1975), second violin
- René Jeanneray (1968–1969), Gérard Caussé (1969-1971), Claude Naveau (1971-) viola
- René Benedetti (1968–1971), Roland Pidoux (1971-1978), Jean-Marie Gamard (1978-) cello

== Premieres ==
- André Casanova's string quartet n° 3 (1989)
- Jacques Castérède's pro tempore passionis string quartet (1989)

== Sources ==
- Alain Pâris Dictionnaire des interprètes, Bouquins/Laffont 1989, p. 1072
