= Tighennif =

- Commune and town
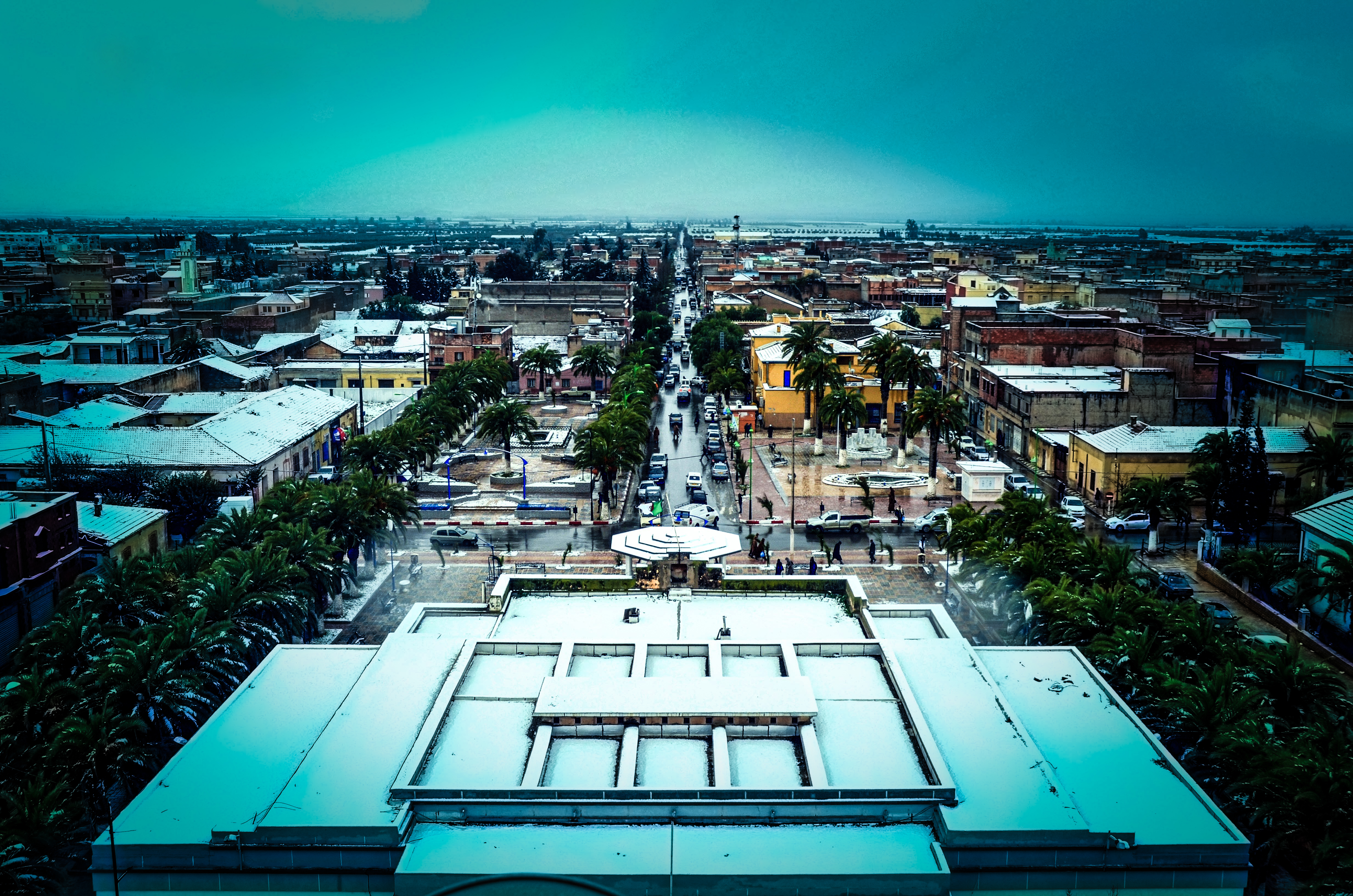

- Location within Algeria
- Country: Algeria
- Province: Mascara Province
- Palikao: 28 January 1870

Population (2008)
  - Total: 55,800
- Time zone: UTC+1 (CET)

Tighennif (Arabic: تيغنيف) is a town and commune in Mascara Province, Algeria. According to the 2002 census it has a population of 55,800.

== Fossil ==
- Ternifine or Tighennif is the home of a fossil human jawbone dating to the Middle Pleistocene, which French vertebrate paleontologist Camille Arambourg classified as Atlanthropus mauritanicus in 1955.

== Personalities ==
- Charles Guillaume Marie Appollinaire Antoine Cousin Montauban, comte de Palikao was a general associated with Tighennif.
- Henri Akoka, French-Algerian clarinetist.
