= Valérie Soudères =

French pianist and composer (1914–1995)

- Born: Valérie Briggs; 19 September 1914
- Died: 15 March 1995 (aged 80)
- Education: Conservatoire de Paris (First Prizes)
- Occupations: Pianist; composer; pedagogue
- Employer: Conservatoire de Paris
- Style: Classical
- Spouse: François-Robert Soudères
- Honours: Chevalier of the Légion d'honneur

Valérie Soudères (née Briggs; 19 September 1914 – 15 March 1995), also known in her early days as Valerie Hamilton, was a French pianist, composer and pedagogue.

== Biography ==
Born in 1914, Soudères was the daughter of Georges-Hamilton Briggs, an English architect living in France. She entered the Conservatoire de Paris, where she was a student of Maurice Emmanuel and won the First Prizes of the Conservatoire for piano, harmony, history of music, fugue and counterpoint, and accompaniment as well as a Second Prize for musical composition.

She launched herself as a pianist by adopting the pseudonym Valérie Hamilton. A refugee in London during World War II, she married François-Robert Soudères, originally from Béarn, and became Valérie Soudères.

Returning to France, she taught piano and sight-reading at the Conservatoire de Paris to, in particular, students Isabelle Henriot and Bill Finegan. A renowned pianist, she performed, on 29 February 1948, Béla Bartók's Piano Concerto No. 3 on the occasion of its premiere in France, with the Pasdeloup Orchestra under the direction of Pierre Dervaux at the Salle Gaveau. She also took part to the premiere of Darius Milhaud's 4th Piano Concerto on 5 March 1952.

She organised events, such as the Honegger festival in 1953. In October 1954, she spoke in Paris at the first international congress devoted to the sociological aspects of music on radio.

In particular, she composed the Concerto béarnais, premiered on 25 May 1947 with the Orchestre Lamoureux, performed in 1948 with the Pasdeloup Orchestra under the direction of Eugène Bigot and with the Orchestre de la Suisse Romande, then in 1949 in Great Britain and the Netherlands, and in 1962 with the Orchestre philharmonique de Radio France under the direction of Trajan Popesco, the Suite pour contrebasse et orchestre, the Concerto pour flûte, and an opera, Que ma joie demeure, based on the eponymous novel by Jean Giono. This opera was premiered on 13 June 1958 by the orchestre de la RTF under the direction of Pierre Dervaux.

After having been a soloist for European radio stations, she became a "listening critic" for the Office de Radiodiffusion Télévision Française and was trained to electroacoustic music in Pierre Schaeffer's Groupe de Recherches Musicales.

In 1948, she was awarded the Suzanne Mesureur prize by the Société des auteurs, compositeurs et éditeurs de musique and made a chevalier of the Légion d'honneur in 1965.

Soudères died in 1995.

The orchestre de Pau Pays de Béarn and Jean-Claude Pennetier, husband of her daughter France, interpret her Concerto béarnais en 2016.

== Selected works ==
=== Compositions ===
- Concerto béarnais for piano and orchestra, premiered in Paris in May 1947 by the Orchestre Lamoureux
- Que ma joie demeure, lyrical drama on a text by Jean Giono, libretto by François-Robert Soudères, premiered on the Radiodiffusion-Télévision Française on 13 June 1958 under the direction of Pierre Dervaux, with Nadine Sautereau, Ginette Guillamat, Írma Kolássi, Camille Maurane, Xavier Depraz, Louis-Jacques Rondeleux and Louis Noguéra as interpreters.
- Stances et mouvement perpétuel for oboe and orchestra (circa 1951, Éditions Durand-Salabert-Eschig ME 6633) OCLC 724866398
- Suite pour contrebasse et orchestre, six pièces pour contrebasse ou violoncelle et piano circa 1949, Éditions Costallat).
- Menuet-Fantaisie, for flute and piano (Durand, Amphion DA 1620) ISMN 9790230200547

=== Writings ===
- Sens actuel de la pensée contrapuntic in Inventaire des techniques rédactionnelles, Polyphonie, revue musicale, cahiers 9–10, Paris, Richard-Masse 1954. OCLC 41943936.
- Les possibilités d'évolution rapide des jeunes compositeurs grâce à la radio, 1955.

== Bibliography ==
- Le guide du concert et du disque, n° 263–264, 11–27 March 1960: Valérie Soudères on the cover.
- Marc Pierret [in French] (1969). "Séminaire du Conservatoire. Séance du 21 mai 1969 (extraits). p. 65-71". Entretiens avec Pierre Schaeffer. Paris: Pierre Belfond. p. 197. bnf=43204377.
