= Jean-Pierre Sabouret =

French violinist

Jean-Pierre Sabouret (4 December 1944 – 25 April 2007) was a French classical violinist.

== Career ==
Winner of several international awards (Fondation de la Vocation in 1963, Golden Medal of the Maria Canals International Music Competition of Barcelona in 1964), Sabouret was invited by many orchestras in France and abroad. A member of prestigious chamber music ensembles including the Loewenguth Quartet, he later joined the Via Nova Quartet.

A soloist of the Contemporary classical music "Ensemble l'Itinéraire" for ten years, then of the Orchestre philharmonique de Strasbourg (1974-1976), he joined the orchestra of the Paris Opera in 1977, where he became violin solo. He held these positions until 2006.

Also a pedagogue, he founded a music school in Ablon-sur-Seine in the Paris region. He was also professor of violin and chamber music at the Conservatory of Athis-Mons (Essonne), then at the Paul-Dukas Conservatory (12th arrondissement of Paris). Finally, he spent a few years as an assistant professor at the Conservatoire de Paris.
