= Pierre Pasquier (violist) =

French violist

Pierre Pasquier (14 September 1902 – 1986) was a French violist.

Born in Tours, Pasquier was a student of Maurice Vieux. He obtained his first prize in viola in 1922. He founded the Trio Pasquier with his brothers Jean and Étienne, as soon as he graduated from the Conservatoire de Paris, in 1927.

Pasquier's career as an international soloist was simultaneously complemented by that of an orchestral musician and music educator. Appointed a professor of chamber music at the Conservatoire in 1943, he trained many students who distinguished themselves by their exceptional musical sense.

Since his childhood Pasquier also showed a real talent for caricature as a cartoonist.

His son Bruno Pasquier is also a violist. His other son Régis Pasquier is a violinist.

Pierre Pasquier died in Neuilly-sur-Seine in 1986.
