= Stalag VIII-A =

German World War II prisoner-of-war camp at Görlitz

- Görlitz (Zgorzelec), Lower Silesia
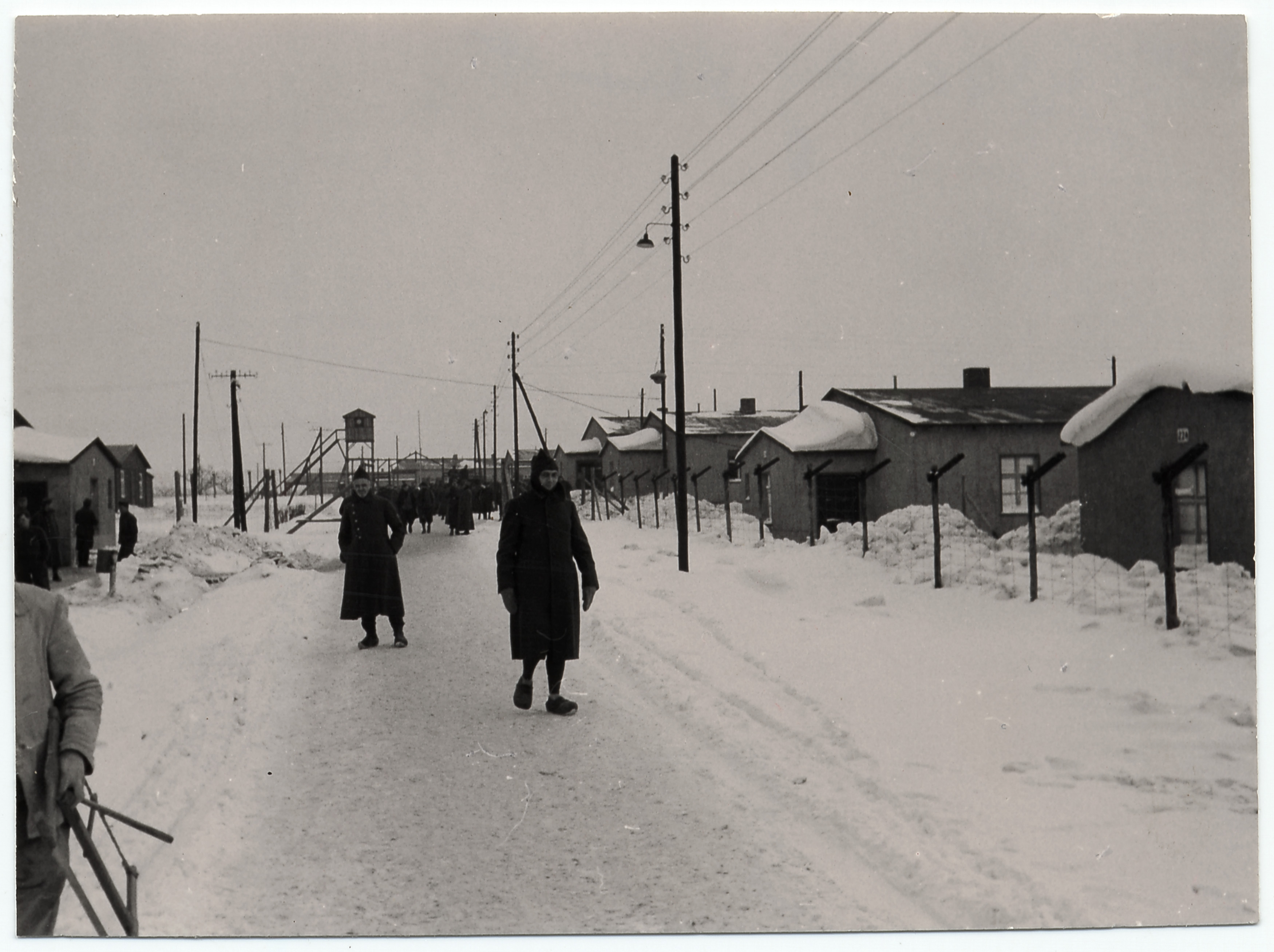

Site information
- Type: Prisoner-of-war camp
- Controlled by: Nazi Germany

Location
- Görlitz, Germany (pre-war borders, 1937) Stalag VIII-A (Germany)
- Coordinates: 51.12152°N 15.01002°E

Site history
- In use: 1939–1945
- Battles/wars: World War II

Garrison information
- Occupants: Polish POWs and civilians, Belgian, French, Soviet, British, Canadian, Australian, New Zealand, South African, Italian, Yugoslav, Slovak, American and other Allied POWs

Stalag VIII-A was a German World War II prisoner-of-war camp, located just to the south of the town of Görlitz in Lower Silesia, east of the River Neisse. The location of the camp lies in today's Polish town of Zgorzelec, which lies over the river from Görlitz.

It was originally set up as a Hitler Jugend (Hitler Youth) camp, converted in October 1939 to house Polish prisoners (both soldiers and civilians), and later held up to 30,000 Allied prisoners of war (POWs), including Belgians, the French, Soviets, Britons, Canadians, Australians, New Zealanders, South Africans, Italians, Yugoslavs, Slovaks and Americans, before its evacuation in February 1945. Its most famous inmate was French composer Olivier Messiaen.

== Camp history ==
Originally a Hitler Youth camp, in October 1939 it was modified to house about 15,000 Polish prisoners from the German September 1939 offensive. It was established on 26 August 1939, a few days before the German invasion of Poland, which started World War II. It was initially a transit camp or Dulag located on an 18-hectare field alongside Ulica Lubańska, renamed as Stalag VIII–A on 23 September 1939. Polish POWs who were either deported west to Germany or sent to nearby forced labour subcamps were held in the camp. The first 8,000 Polish POWs were brought to the camp on 7 September 1939. It also served as a transit camp for Polish civilians, including women, as well as activists and intelligentsia from Silesia, Greater Poland and Pomerania, who were arrested during the Intelligenzaktion to be deported to Nazi concentration camps in Germany. At the end of December 1939 the prisoners were transferred to the main camp in Ujazd (then officially Moys), located on the right side of the road from Görlitz to Bogatynia (then officially Reichenau). Poor sanitary conditions led to frequent epidemic outbreaks in the camp. Around 3,000 people were held in the camp, while 7,000 were sent to forced labour subcamps in the region. Most of the over 10,000 prisoners were Poles, others included Czechs, Lithuanians, Belarusians and Jews. It was the first prisoner of war camp in the military district VIII Breslau (Wrocław). The camp covered about 30 ha.

By June 1940 most of the Poles had been transferred to other camps and replaced with Belgian and French troops taken prisoner during the Battle of France. Due to the lack of infrastructure, the French and Belgians were held in tents in mid-1940. At one time there were over 30,000 jammed into facilities designed for 15,000. In 1941 a separate compound was created to house Soviet prisoners. Over 1,500 Jews were deported from the camp to Lublin in German-occupied Poland in 1941, and last Poles were deported from the camp in 1942. In 1943, 2,500 British Commonwealth soldiers came from the battles in Italy, among them residents from the British Isles, Canada, Australia, New Zealand and South Africa. Later in the same year more than 6,000 Italian soldiers came from Albania. A total of 47,328, the highest number of prisoners in Stalag VIII A was registered in September 1944. Numerically, Frenchmen were in the majority, followed by the Russians, Italians, Belgians, Britons and the Yugoslavs. In late 1944, 37 Poles, participants of the Warsaw Uprising, and 1,500 Slovaks from the Slovak National Uprising were brought to the camp. Finally in late December 1944 1,800 Americans arrived, captured in the Battle of the Bulge. Soviet and Italian POWs suffered the worst sanitary conditions and were deprived of medical care. French paramedics helped them temporarily, however, there was a high mortality rate among them. In April 1945, 217 ill Polish POWs were brought from Tangerhütte to Stalag VIII-A.

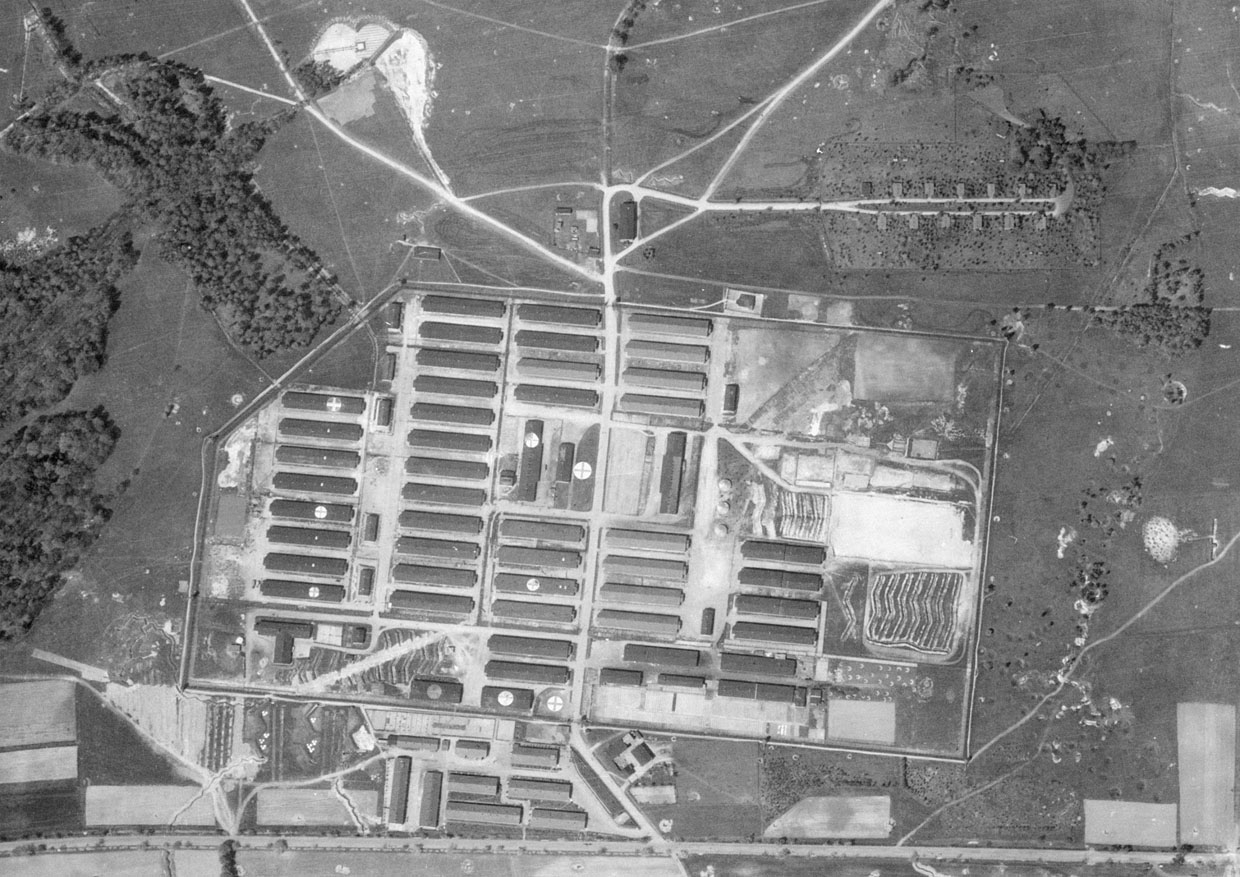
Bird's-eye view picture taken by US Army in World War II

On 14 February 1945 the Americans and British were marched out of the camp westward in advance of the Soviet offensive into Germany. The evacuation process was carried out gradually through to May 1945. The evacuation took place on foot, with all means of transport driving in front of the people for military purposes. The Long March claimed further victims. Some of the prisoners were taken to Bavaria, others to Thuringia, where they were freed by the Allies. The last evacuation of the camp took place on 7 May 1945, when the Soviet army freed the prisoners.

After the war, many graves of western soldiers were exhumed and sent back to their home countries. In 1948 the city council of Zgorzelec decided to have the barracks dismantled in order to use the materials to rebuild Warsaw and other Polish towns.

In 1976 a memorial was erected on the site of the former commandant’s office by French and Polish veterans who had been POWs. On the sandstone plate next to the memorial it says: Stalag VIIIA: A place sanctified by the blood and martyrdom of the prisoners of war of the anti-Hitler coalition during the Second World War – 22.VII.1976 French veterans of the camp arranged for a marble slab to be attached to the memorial in 1994. On the slab it says in Polish and French: "1939 Stalag VIIIA 1945: Through this camp walked, in it lived and suffered ten thousands of prisoners of war".

== Forced labour subcamps ==
There were numerous forced labour camps subordinate to Stalag VIII-A, located in various places throughout Lower Silesia. In 1943 there were 976 such camps. Locations include Daubitz, Kowary, Legnica, Przełęcz Karkonoska, Raszowa, Strzegom, Strzelin and Wałbrzych.

== Notable inmates ==
It was at VIII-A that the 31-year old composer and medic Olivier Messiaen, a French prisoner, finished composing Quatuor pour la fin du temps, his most famous work, a piece of chamber music. With the help of a friendly German guard (Carl-Albert Brüll), he acquired manuscript paper and pencils, and was able to befriend three other POWs (violinist Jean le Boulaire, clarinettist Henri Akoka, and cellist Étienne Pasquier). Together they premiered the work at the camp hall on 15 January 1941.

== Legacy ==
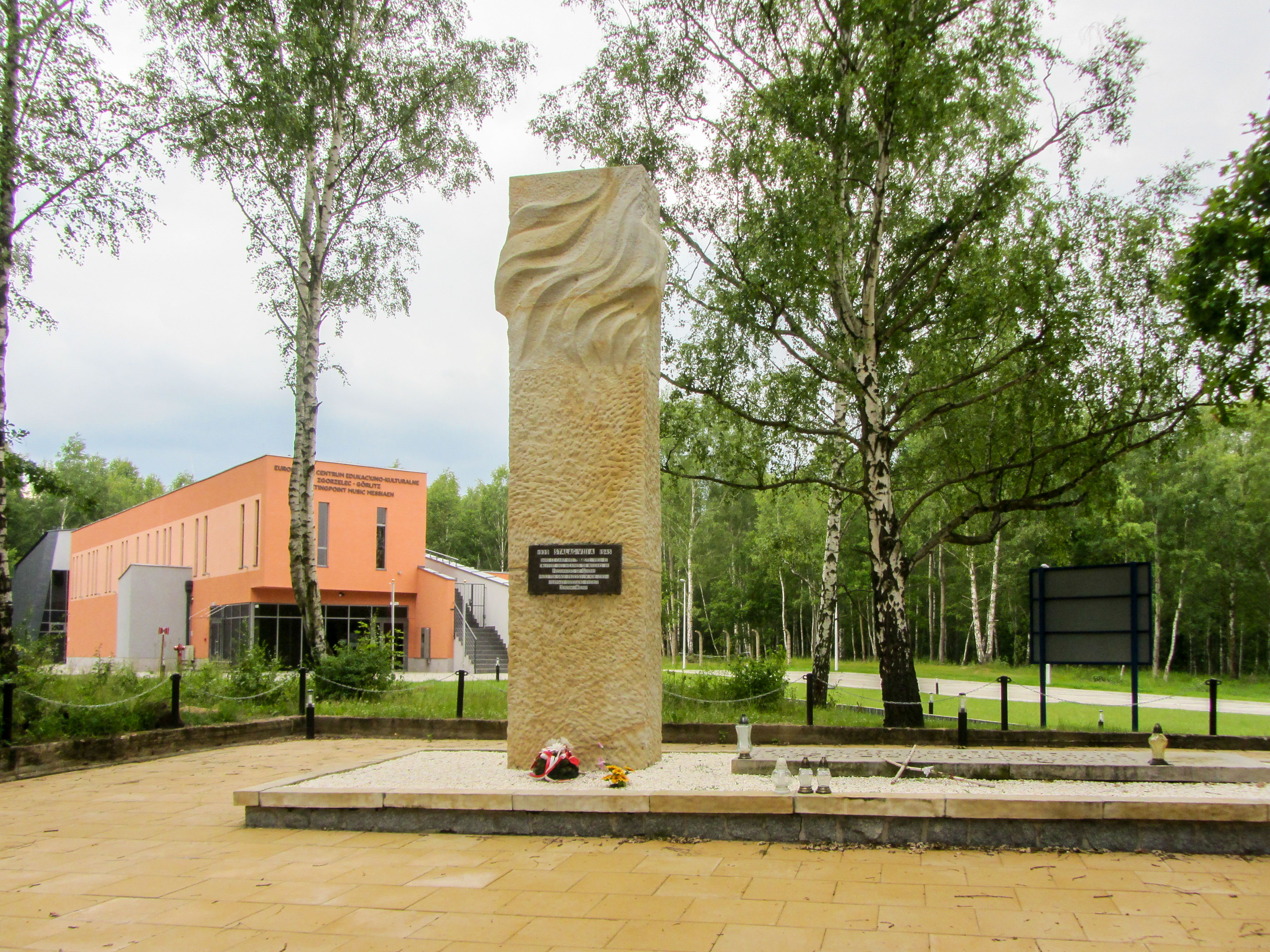
Memorial to the victims

In 2011 the German alternative rock band Topictoday dedicated their Song "Helden ohne Namen" ("Heroes without Names") to the POWs of the camp, especially to Olivier Messiaen.

In 2014 a German-Polish joint project, the Meeting Point Music Messiaen e.V., built a European cultural centre near the site of the former POW camp Stalag VIII-A. The idea of building a European Center of Education and Culture for children, the youth, artists, musicians and all the people of the European trinational region in this important place for European history emerged in December 2004. The role of the centre is not only to be a memorial place, but to give room for development and a broad range of artistic activities and creative development. A map and detailed history of Stalag VIII-A can be found on the website.

In September 2017, the centre hosted a conference entitled Stalag VIIIA and European memory of The Second World War POWs.

== See also ==
- List of prisoner-of-war camps in Germany
