= Henri Akoka =

French clarinetist

Henri (or Henry) Akoka (23 June 1912 – 22 November 1976) was an Algerian Jewish clarinetist.

== Biography ==
Akoka was born on 23 June 1912 in Palikao, Algeria, then French territory. He was the second of six children of Abraham Akoka, a trumpet player, who in 1926 moved the family to Ponthierry, France, so that the children could pursue music. Henri began playing in the band at the wallpaper factory where his father worked, and also performed in silent film soundtracks beginning at age 14. During this period, he studied under Briançon.

He graduated from the Conservatoire de Paris with the first prize in clarinet in 1935. He first joined the Orchestre Symphonique de la Radio-diffusion de Strasbourg, and later became a member of the Orchestre National de la Radio in Paris. At the outbreak of the Second World War in 1939, Akoka was sent to a military orchestra in Verdun, where he met Étienne Pasquier and Olivier Messiaen. All three were captured by Nazi forces in June 1940. While they were awaiting transport to a German prison camp, Akoka sight-read Messiaen's composition "Abîme des Oiseaux" for solo clarinet, though he "grumbled" about its difficulty. They were then sent to Stalag VIII-A, where they met violinist Jean Le Boulaire. It was for this ensemble that Messiaen composed his Quatuor pour la fin du temps, premiered in the camp in January 1941. After the war, Akoka stated that this quartet was "the only memory of the war that I wish to keep"; however, he never again performed it.

Akoka's release from the camp was arranged by Karl-Albert Brüll, a guard who provided false papers for Messiaen. However, he was removed from the transport truck "because of his Jewish looks". He later escaped in April 1941 by jumping off from the top of a moving train "with his clarinet under his arm". He returned to the Orchestre National de la Radio, which was operating out of the Free Zone of Marseilles.

After gaining his freedom, Akoka had a successful orchestral career, serving as the assistant principal clarinet for the Orchestre Philharmonique de Radio France. His colleagues nicknamed him "the Kreisler of the clarinet".

Akoka died on 22 November 1976 of cancer.
