= Roland Pidoux =

French cellist and conductor (1946–2025)

- Pidoux c. 2010
- Born: 29 October 1946; Paris, France
- Died: 21 September 2025 (aged 78)
- Education: Conservatoire de Paris
- Occupation: Classical cellist
- Organizations: Via Nova Quartet; Pasquier Trio; Rencontres de violoncelle; Conservatoire de Paris
- Children: Raphaël Pidoux

Roland Pidoux (29 October 1946 – 21 September 2025) was a French cellist and academic teacher. He was principal cellist of the Orchestre national de France from 1978 to 1987 and professor at the Conservatoire de Paris from 1988 to 2012. With a focus on chamber music, he played in a string quartet, a string trio and a piano trio, performing and recording with colleagues including violinist Régis Pasquier, violist Bruno Pasquier and pianist Jean-Claude Pennetier.

== Life and career ==
Pidoux was born in Paris on 29 October 1946. He studied at the Conservatoire de Paris until 1966 with André Navarra, Jean Hubeau, and Joseph Calvet. He founded the Ensemble Instrumental de France, which became the Ensemble Orchestral de Paris, with Jean-Pierre Wallez, and was a member of the Via Nova Quartet for seven years. He also founded the Wanderer Trio and was a founding member of Les Violoncelles Français, a cello octet.

He entered the orchestra of the Opéra de Paris in 1969, and then was principal cellist of the Orchestre national de France from 1978 to 1987. There, he played with cellists Pierre Fournier and Mstislav Rostropovich, flutist Jean-Pierre Rampal and violinist Isaac Stern. At the same time, he was a member of the New Pasquier Trio with Régis Pasquier (violin) and Bruno Pasquier (viola), succeeding the original 1927 Pasquier Trio of the father and uncles of the brothers. Pidoux also formed a piano trio with Jean-Claude Pennetier and Régis Pasquier.

Pidoux taught at the Académie musicale in Villecroze. He was a professor at the Conservatoire de Paris from 1988 to 2012 and also taught at the Alfred Cortot School of Music. He wrote arrangements of symphonies, operatic music and piano pieces for cello ensembles. He was artistic director of the Rencontres de violoncelle at Bélaye (Lot) from 1988.

Pidoux appeared in the role of cellist Pablo Casals in Pablo Larraín's Jackie. He played a 1741 cello built by Gennaro Gagliano that was previously used by André Navarra. From 2015, he played a cello built by Frank Ravatin.

== Personal life ==
Pidoux was the father of cellist Raphaël Pidoux.

Pidoux died on 21 September 2025, at the age of 78, His son wrote in memory: "My father was an absolute musician, but above all, he was someone who passed on his passion. He taught us much more than the cello: a sense of high standards, a curiosity and a deep love for life. His warm sound, his creative spirit and his energy will continue to guide us." A funeral will be held for Pidoux on 30 September 2025, in Paris.

== Recordings ==
Pidoux made more than 100 recordings, mostly with Harmonia Mundi.

- Beethoven: complete works for cello and piano, with Jean-Claude Pennetier (Saphir, 2001)
- Mozart: Clarinet Quintet, with Michel Portal and others
- Schubert: Piano Trio No. 2, with Jean-Claude Pennetier and Régis Pasquier (1980)
- Schubert: Arpeggione Sonata, String Trios, with Régis Pasquier, Bruno Pasquier and Jean-Claude Pennetier (1980)
- Chausson: Concert for Violin, Piano and String Quartet, with Régis Pasquier, Pennetier, Roland Daugareil, Geneviève Simonot, Bruno Pasquier (1980)
- Saint-Saëns: Cello Sonatas with Jean Hubeau, Radio France (1991) / Warner Classics
