= Geistervariationen =

Piano composition by Robert Schumann

Variations on an Original Theme
- Geistervariationen
- by Robert Schumann
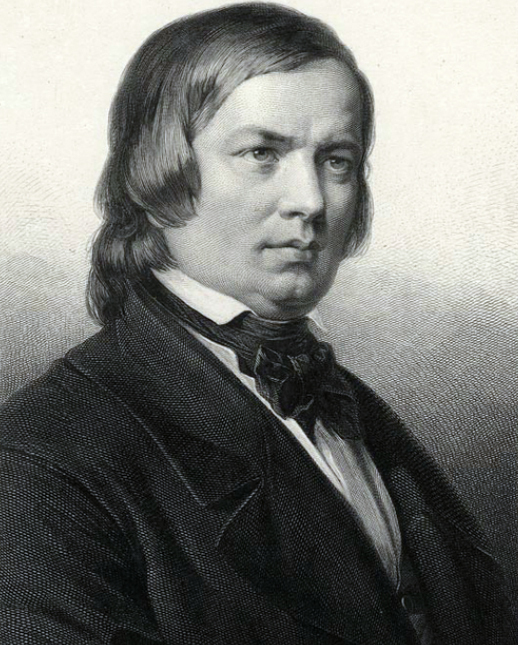
- Schumann around the time of composing
- Key: E♭ major
- Catalogue: WoO 24
- Based on: Second movement of his Violin Concerto
- Composed: 1854, Bonn
- Dedication: Clara Schumann
- Published: 1939
- Duration: c. 15 minutes
- Movements: Theme + 5 variations
- Scoring: Solo piano

The Geistervariationen (Ghost Variations), or Theme and Variations in E♭ major for piano, WoO 24, composed in 1854, is the last completed work of Robert Schumann. The variations were composed in the time leading up to his admission to an asylum for the insane and are infrequently played or recorded today.

A typical performance of this work lasts roughly 15 minutes.

== History ==
This was Schumann's last work before he was admitted to the asylum in Bonn-Endenich. Wolf-Dieter Seiffert wrote in the preface to Thema mit Variationen (Geistervariation) that at this time of his life, Schumann believed that he was surrounded by spirits who played him music, both "wonderful" and "hideous". They offered him "most magnificent revelations", but also threatened to send him to Hell.

Seiffert goes on to write that on 17 or 18 February 1854, Schumann wrote down a theme he said was dictated to him by voices like those of angels. He did not recognize that it was actually a theme which he had composed previously. Several days later, he wrote a set of variations on this theme. While he was still working on the composition, on 27 February he suddenly threw himself half clothed into the freezing Rhine river, from which he was rescued and returned home. After surviving the suicide attempt, he continued to work on it. The next day, he completed the work and sent the manuscript to his wife, Clara, who had left him the night before, on the advice of a doctor.

== Form ==
1. Theme – Leise, innig (Quiet, earnest)
2. Variation I
3. Variation II – Canonisch (Like a canon)
4. Variation III – Etwas belebter (Somewhat more animated)
5. Variation IV
6. Variation V

== Works which quote WoO 24 ==
- Brahms: Variations on a Theme of Robert Schumann, piano four hands, Op. 23
- Aribert Reimann: Seven Fragments for Orchestra in memory of Robert Schumann (1988)
- Tori Amos: "Your Ghost" (Night of Hunters, 2011)

== Discography ==
Below is an incomplete list of recordings of the Geistervariationen:

Year	Pianist	Label
2011	András Schiff	ECM Records
2015	Imogen Cooper	Chandos Records
2016	Olivier Chauzu	Naxos
2020	Eric Lu	Warner Classics
2023	Aaron Pilsan	Alpha Classics
2026	Dasol Kim	Aparté
