= Damien Top =

French tenor, musicologist and conductor

Damien Top (born 13 July 1973, in Rouen) is a French tenor, musicologist and conductor. He is the artistic director of the International Albert Roussel Festival, which he founded in 1997 in Bavinchove, Northern France.

== Career ==
Damien Top is an artist of contemporary French music as a singer, conductor, composer and musicologist. He was honoured by the French government in 2002 with the Prix Charles Oulmont for his contributions to French culture. He serves as artistic director for the Lotte Lehmann Foundation.

Graduate of the Conservatoire of Lille and the Conservatoire National Supérieur de Musique de Paris, Damien Top studied with Galina Vishnevskaya, Jean-Christophe Benoît and Jacques Pottier. He has appeared in opera, operetta, and sacred works, as well as performing French mélodie.

Many contemporary composers have created works for him across Europe, North America, and Oceania.

He has given recitals at Flâneries Musicales de Reims for the Yehudi Menuhin Foundation, Musicales en Valois, Festival des Grands Crus de Bourgogne, Festival de la Mélodie Française of Toulouse, as well as performances in Australia, Belgium, Canada, the Czech Republic, Spain, Germany, Great Britain, Italy, Macedonia, Mexico, New Zealand, and the United States.

As student of Sergiu Celibidache, he has conducted the Orchestre du Festival Roussel, the Joseph Jongen Ensemble, the Czech Chamber Soloists, and the Prague Philharmonic Chamber Orchestra, Mihail Jora Philharmonic Orchestra among others.

His biography of Albert Roussel was published in 2016 by Bleu Nuit. He has also written studies on Sergei Rachmaninoff (1873–1943), Émile Goué (1904–1946) and René de Castéra (1873–1955), for which he was awarded the Prix du Salon du Livre d’Hossegor. Top publishes a monthly music column in Politique Magazine.

He is director of the Centre International Albert-Roussel which he founded in 1992 and of the Albert-Roussel International Festival.

== Discography ==
- Jules Massenet : Poème d'avril, Poème du Souvenir, Poème d'hiver, Expressions Lyriques BNL 1992
- Von Appel : Il triompho della musica, Naxos 2001
- Edmond de Coussemaker : Romances et chansons, RCP 2003
- Émile Goué : Mélodies, SyPr 2006
- Albert Roussel, Jacques Ibert : Mélodies, Azur 2021
- Claude Guillon-Verne : Mélodies, Azur 2021
- Émile Goué : Mélodies avec quatuor, Azur 2014
- Isaac Albéniz : Yvonne en visite, in Album pour enfants, CIAR Classics 2025

Papers

- « Un maître hors-norme : les relations Roussel-Martinu », Template:Latin Akten des Musikwissenschaftlichen Kolloquiums Brno, 1990
- « Paris (1870-1914) : Schauplatz des dritten goldenen Zeitalters der französischen Musik », Template:Latin Akten des Musikwissenschaftlichen Kolloquiums Brno, 1993
- « Musik und Litteratur : La Bonne Chanson von Gabriel Fauré », Template:Latin Akten des Musikwissenschaftlichen Kolloquiums Brno, 1994
- « La Sinfonietta de Roussel », Template:Latin Revue Analyse Musicale, 1998
- « Le Lyonnais et le Flamand », Template:Latin Le mouvement scholiste de Paris à Lyon, coord. Isabelle Bretaudeau, Symétrie, 2003
- À la recherche du ballet perdu : Le Musicien de Saint-Merry d'Apollinaire et Casabon, in "Que Vlo-Ve?", bulletin international des études sur Guillaume Apollinaire, No. 25-26, janvier-juin 2004
- Een verloren perel : la musique d'Edmond de Coussemaker, Annales du Comité flamand de France, 2005
- Maurice Ravel et Albert Roussel in Piano magazine, 2006
- La "beauté vivante" du spectacle roussélien, in Padmâvatî, brochure-programme, Théâtre du Châtelet, 2008
- Les tribulations d'un chinois français : un portrait de Louis Laloy, in Padmâvatî, brochure-programme, Théâtre du Châtelet, 2008
- Albert Roussel et Blanche Selva, in "Blanche Selva, naissance d'un piano moderne", coord. Jean-Marc Warszawski, Symétrie, 2010
- Franz Liszt et la Schola Cantorum, une descendance inattendue, in Euterpe, No. 16 février 2010, No. 19 septembre 2011, No. 20 février 2012,
- Aspects de la vie musicale dans le canton de Cassel au 19th century, Annales du Comité flamand de France, 2010
- Aperçu sur la polytonalité dans l’œuvre d’Émile Goué in Polytonalités, coord. Philippe Malhaire, L’Harmattan, 2011
- Jules Massenet, "Le testament lyrique de l'expression mélodique", in Tempus Perfectum No. 9, Symétrie, été 2012
- Œdipe au Stalag, genèse et métamorphoses de l'oratorio de Maurice Thiriet, in Euterpe No. 23, septembre 2013
- Edmond de Coussemaker, le Comité flamand de France et les liens culturels entre Flandres française et belge, (avec Solange de Coussemaker), revue Romaneske, Université de Louvain, Template:38e, No. 3, décembre 2013
- L’Horizon mirifique d’Emile Goué, in "Emile Goué, le chaînon manquant", coord. Philippe Malhaire, L'Harmattan, 2014
- Jacqueline Fontyn, Nulla dies sine nota, Gespräch mit Damien Top, Analyse von "Alba", Studien zur Wertungsforschung, Universal Édition 26855, 2013
- Charles Bordes et l'opéra basque, in "Charles Bordes et la musique basque", brochure des Journées Charles Bordes, Tours, 2014
- Jacqueline Fontyn, Nulla dies sine nota, analyse de "Alba", éditions Aedam Musicae, 2014
- Deux destins singuliers : Roussel et Delvincourt, in 'Mon violon m'a sauvé la vie', Destins de musiciens dans la Grande guerre, Musée de la Grande guerre de Meaux/Lienart éditions, 2015
- William Orpen à Cassel, Cassel Horizons, 2015
- Henri-Pierre Roché et les musiciens, in "Cahiers de L'Herne", 2015
- Quelques notes pour quelques neumes, à propos du manuscrit 2389 de la Bibliothèque Nationale de France, Bulletin du Comité Flamand de France, 2016
- "C’est ici que j’aurais dû naître". L’inspiration basque et landaise dans l’œuvre de Robert Scheffer. Bulletin de la Société Historique et Archéologique du Périgord, Tome CXLIV, 2017
- Joseph Candeille, Bulletin du Comité Flamand de France, 2018
- "Trois mages en quête d'un royaume", étude sur le chant traditionnel des Dry Koningen, Bulletin du Comité Flamand de France, juin 2019
- Jacqueline Fontyn, Not a day without a note, Alba by Damien Top, Vienna, Universal Édition, 26339, 2020
- Dans la volière scholiste : in "Étudier, enseigner et composer à la Schola Cantorum (1896-1962)" sous la direction de Sylvie Douche, Aedam Musicae, novembre 2022
- L'invisible présence d'Andrée Brunin, in Visages d'écrivains, Fédération des Maisons d’Écrivains et des Patrimoines Littéraires, 2023
- Andrée Brunin, le vent de la liberté, Livr’arbitres n°45, mars 2024
- Andries Steven, chantre de Cassel et de la Flandre, Livr’arbitres n°45, mars 2024
- La curiosité en éveil d'Andrée Brunin, in Plumes de sciences, Fédération des Maisons d’Écrivains et des Patrimoines Littéraires, 2025
