= Topictoday =

Topictoday is a German alternative rock band from Görlitz. Formed in 2011, the band is mostly known for their song "Helden ohne Namen" ("Heroes without names"), which is dedicated to prisoners of war (POWs) in the Second World War. Topictoday performed the song in 2015 at the location of the former POW camp called Stalag VIII-A, which today lies in Zgorzelec, Poland, in front of politicians from Germany and Poland.

French composer Olivier Messiaen was a prisoner at Stalag VIII-A. He composed the Quatuor pour la fin du temps during his imprisonment, without instruments and equipment.

== Members ==
In 2015 Topictoday consisted of David Berger (vocals/guitar), Jako Schubert (drums), Bruno Winkler (bass) and Carl Duesenberg (guitar/background vocals).
