= Walter Rabl =

Walter Rabl (30 November 1873 in Vienna – 11 July 1940 in Klopein, Klopeiner See/Carinthia) was a Viennese composer, conductor, and teacher of vocal music. Largely forgotten today, Rabl left only a small number of works, all of them early ones, from the twilight of the Romantic era. At the age of 30 he stopped composing entirely and devoted himself to conducting and vocal coaching the rest of his life.

== Life ==
Walter Rabl was born in Vienna and as a child became an excellent pianist. He attended the Institut Le Rosey, a boarding school in Rolle, Switzerland. He went to Salzburg and there studied music theory and composition with J. F. Hummel, director of the Mozarteum. He graduated with honours from the Kaiserlich und Königlich Staatsgymnasium (Royal and Imperial State School) in Salzburg in 1892.

Rabl returned to Vienna to study with Karel Navrátil (1867 - 1936) and then enrolled in the doctoral program at the German University in Prague as a student of the musicologist Guido Adler. At 25, he completed his doctorate and soon after accepted a position at the Royal Opera of Dresden as coach and chorus master.

Beginning in 1903 Rabl conducted throughout Germany and championed works by progressive composers such as Gustav Mahler, Karl Goldmark, Franz Schreker, Erich Korngold, and Richard Strauss. In 1905, Rabl married the soprano Hermine von Kriesten and conducted her in major Wagnerian roles such as Brünnhilde and Elektra.

After his retirement from conducting in 1924, he continued to use his impressive piano skills in accompanying and coaching many notable singers.

== Chamber music ==
Rabl's Quartet in E-Flat Major for Clarinet, Violin, Cello, and Piano, Op. 1 won first prize in 1896 in a prestigious competition for young composers sponsored by the Vienna Tonkünstlerverein (Musicians' Society) of which Johannes Brahms was honorary president and a judge of the competition. Brahms recommended the piece to his own publisher, Simrock, who released it the following year along with three other Rabl works: the Fantasy Pieces for Piano Trio, Op. 2, and two sets of Four Songs, Op. 3 and Op. 4. The Op. 1 quartet appears to be the first work ever written for that combination, which was later more famously used by Olivier Messiaen in his Quatuor pour la fin du temps ("Quartet for the end of time"), composed in 1941. The parts to the Op. 1 Quartet were reprinted by Edition Silvertrust in 2007.

In 1899, Simrock published four additional pieces by Rabl: Four Songs, Op. 5; the Violin Sonata, Op. 6; Three Songs, Op. 7; and the Symphony, Op. 8.

His next series of compositions, Op. 9–15, consisted entirely of songs. They were published in Leipzig by the house founded by Daniel Rahter (D. Rahter).

== Opera ==
Most of Rabl's work was in the tradition of Brahms and Robert Schumann. But his opera, Liane (1903) based on a romantic fairy tale took a different turn, a turn in the direction of Richard Wagner. Although the reception of the opera was highly favorable, Liane was Rabl's last work.

== Discography and works ==
- Twilight of the Romantics: Chamber Music by Walter Rabl and Josef Labor. Played by the Orion Ensemble. Released in 2006 by Cedille Records (CDR 90000 088).
- Quartet for Violin, Cello, Clarinet and Piano, Op. 1 (together with chamber music by Brahms and Zemlinsky). Played by the Ensemble Kontraste. Released in 1993 by Thorofon (THO 2368).
- Fantasiestücke for Piano trio op. 2
- Sonata for Violin and Piano in D major Op. 6
- Symphony in D minor, Op. 8

== Sources ==
- Twilight of the Romantics, Program notes by Bonnie Campbell
- Strauss, John F. (ed.) (1996), "Walter Rabl: Complete instrumental chamber works". Madison, Wisconsin: A-R Editions. ISBN 9780895793324.
