= Gérard Gefen =

French musicologist and writer

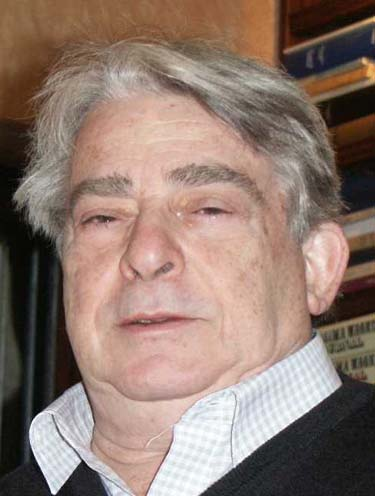
Gérard Gefen

Gérard Gefen (3 July 1934 – 6 August 2003) was a French musicologist and writer. He was also a journalist and music critic, translator, radio and classical record producer.

== Career ==
Gefen studied philosophy and political science together with art history and music and eventually turned to music.

He produced programmes for Radio France and collaborated with several music press magazines (La Lettre du musicien...), in particular as editor-in-chief of Symphonia.

He is buried in the Ville-d'Avray cemetery.

== Publications ==
Gefen published mainly at éditions du Chêne, Fayard and éditions de l'Archipel.

=== Monographs ===
- Gérard Gefen (1986). Furtwängler, une biographie par le disque (in French). Paris: Éditions Belfond. p. 222. ISBN 271441866X. OCLC 18751614. — Reissue updated:
  - Wilhelm Furtwängler: la puissance et la gloire, éditions de l'Archipel 2001 OCLC 50644279 — preface by Elisabeth Furtwängler. With audio disc. Followed by Je n'ai pas cédé, unpublished work.
- Gérard Gefen (1986). Augusta Holmès l'outrancière (in French). Paris: Belfond. p. 276. ISBN 2-7144-2153-9. OCLC 461971820.
- L'Assassinat de Jean-Marie Leclair : récit, Belfond 1990 OCLC 319827623 — foreword by Philippe Beaussant |url=http://gallica.bnf.fr/ark:/12148/bpt6k4801920w/f5.image] available at Gallica.
- Gérard Gefen (1992). Histoire de la musique anglaise. Les Chemins de la musique (in French). Paris: Fayard. p. 332. ISBN 2-213-02997-0. OCLC 27422593.
- Gérard Gefen (1993). Les musiciens et la Franc-maçonnerie. Les Chemins de la musique (in French). Fayard. p. 232. ISBN 2-213-03167-3. OCLC 937598237.
- Maisons de musiciens, éditions du Chêne, 1997 — photographs by Christine Bastin, Jacques Évrard (illustrations).
- Paris vu du ciel, éditions du Chêne/la Martinière 1997, new. ed. 2000 OCLC 494574969 — photographs by Yann Arthus-Bertrand.
- Paris des artistes : 1840-1940, éditions du Chêne 1998 OCLC 39633969 — photographs by Jean-Marie Del Moral,
- Le Siècle de feu de l’opéra italien, éditions du Chêne 2000 OCLC 412578790
- Gérard Gefen (2000). La Sicile au temps des Guépards, vie quotidienne d'une aristocratie (in French). Paris: éditions du Chêne. OCLC 468194943. — English translation, Sicily, Land of the Leopard Princes published by Tauris Parke 2001.
- Gérard Gefen (2001). Verdi par Verdi (in French). éditions de l'Archipel. p. 285. ISBN 2-84187-278-5. OCLC 716877669.
- Maisons de musiciens, éditions du Chêne 1997 OCLC 499277269 — photographs by Christine Bastin and Jaques Evrard; English edition Composers' houses: Seven Dials, 2000 OCLC 43377557.
- Piano, éditions du Chêne 2002 OCLC 421626945 — photographic report Gilbert Nencioli.
- Jardins des plaisirs, Citadelles et Mazenod 2004 OCLC 469371686 — photographs by Christine Bastin and Jacques Evrard.

=== Articles ===
- Les Inconvenances maçonniques selon Herbert Inman, in Renaissance traditionnelle, N° 90, April 1992, p. 233; issues 91–92, July–October 1992, p. 31.
- La curiosité récompensée, in Les Nouvelles d’Arménie, October 1994 — introduction to pianist Édouard Exerjean.
- Gérard Gefen (1995). "Henry Purcell". Études (in French). 382 (6 (3826)). Paris: 813–820. ISSN 1287-4329. OCLC 914198712. available at Gallica
- Quelques chansons maçonniques anglaises, in Renaissance Traditionnelle, N° 115–116, July–October 1998, p. 291.
- Gérard Gefen. "La Franc-Maçonnerie, vecteur du Classicisme" (in French). Loge d'études et de recherche William Preston. Archived from the original on 2012-02-24.

=== Translations ===
Gérard Gefen also translated works by English economist Andrew Shonfield for the éditions Gallimard, as well as other works in English, notably on music:

- Franco Zeffirelli, Portrait d'un homme du siècle, Belfond 1989 OCLC 41786743
- Andrei Gromyko, Mémoires, Belfond 1989 OCLC 461960348 — translated from English by Françoise Du Sorbier, Gérard Gefen, Amal Naccache and Sabine Montagne.
- Bruce Oudes (éd.) De la part du Président : les archives secrètes de Richard Nixon, Belfond 1991 OCLC 25263998 — translated from American by Gérard Géfen and Roxane Azimi; French edition prepared by Marie Cayrade.
- Mary Jane Phillips-Matz (1996). Giuseppe Verdi, a Biography. Bibliothèque des grands musiciens. Translated by Gérard Gefen. Paris: Fayard. p. 1034. ISBN 2-213-59659-X. OCLC 911343033. Phillips-Matz1996.
- Herbert von Karajan, Une vie pour la musique, édition de l'Archipel 1999 OCLC 43374022 — interview with Richard Osborne (from 1977 to June 1989).
