= Jacques Pottier =

French opera singer (1930–2023)

Jacques Pottier (17 August 1930 – 3 September 2023) was a French operatic lyric tenor and voice teacher. He was a principal tenor with the Opéra National de Paris and made several recordings. He taught at conservatories and trained singers including Sheila and Mireille Mathieu. In 1983 he retired to Melbourne, where he taught at school and the conservatory of the Melbourne University.

== Life and career ==
Jacques Pottier was born in Darnétal on 17 August 1930. He entered the Paris Conservatory in 1954, in the class of Ketty Lapeyrette, while taking lessons in Rouen with Rose Pocidalo with whom he made his debut in Massenet's Werther in 1957. He was also taught by Paul Cabanel, Jean Claverie and Maurice Faure, and after winning a first prize in singing at the Paris Conservatory in 1956, he was awarded a grant to study at the Accademia Musicale Chigiana in Siena, Italy.

In 1961 Pottier appeared at the Opéra de Lille as Calaf in Puccini's Turandot. The following year he entered the Opéra National de Paris as a principal tenor. He performed there the role of the Italian Singer in Der Rosenkavalier by Richard Strauss, alongside Elisabeth Schwarzkopf. By 1972 he had performed roles in Verdi's Rigoletto, Il trovatore, Aïda and Falstaff, Donizetti's Lucia di Lammermoor, Gounod's Faust, Offenbach's Les Contes d'Hoffmann, Bizet's Carmen, Wagner's Der fliegende Holländer, Tannhäuser and Tristan und Isolde, Puccini's Tosca and La Bohème, Leoncavallo's I Pagliacci, Mascagni's Cavalleria rusticana, and Fauré's Prométhée, In concert, he sang in Verdi's Requiem and Beethoven's Ninth Symphony.

Pottier taught voice in Paris music conservatories at Longjumeau, Viry-Châtillon, Palaiseau and La Celle-Saint-Cloud. In the 1970s he taught French musical artists Dalida, Nicole Croisille, Sheila, Mireille Mathieu, Ringo (Guy Bayle) and Thierry Le Luron.

In 1983 he retired to Melbourne, Australia, and has taught singing at Carey Baptist Grammar School, Melbourne Girls Grammar School and at the conservatory of the Melbourne University.

Pottier died in Melbourne on 3 September 2023, at age 93.

== Recordings ==
Pottier recorded Honegger's Le Roi David conducted by Serge Baudo, and Stravinski's Les Noces conducted by Pierre Boulez in 1965.

== Honours ==
In 1975 Pottier was, as a member of the Union Professionnelle des Maîtres du Chant Français, awarded the title "Maître du Chant Français".

Pottier was awarded the French national honours Chevalier de l'Ordre de L'Education Civique and Chevalier de l'Ordre des Arts et des Lettres, reported in the Journal Officiel de la République Française (4 December 1998).

== Publications ==
Pottier's 1991 self-published book, Discover your true voice, describes singing techniques that he has developed over the years.
