= Festival international Albert-Roussel =

The Festival international Albert-Roussel, created in 1997 by the tenor Damien Top to combat cultural desertification in rural areas, takes place every year in the region Nord-Pas-de-Calais and in Belgium in September-October. The programming is mainly focused on 20th century French music and contemporary creation.
