= Quatuor pour la fin du temps =

1941 chamber music work by Messiaen

Quatuor pour la fin du Temps
- Chamber music by Olivier Messiaen
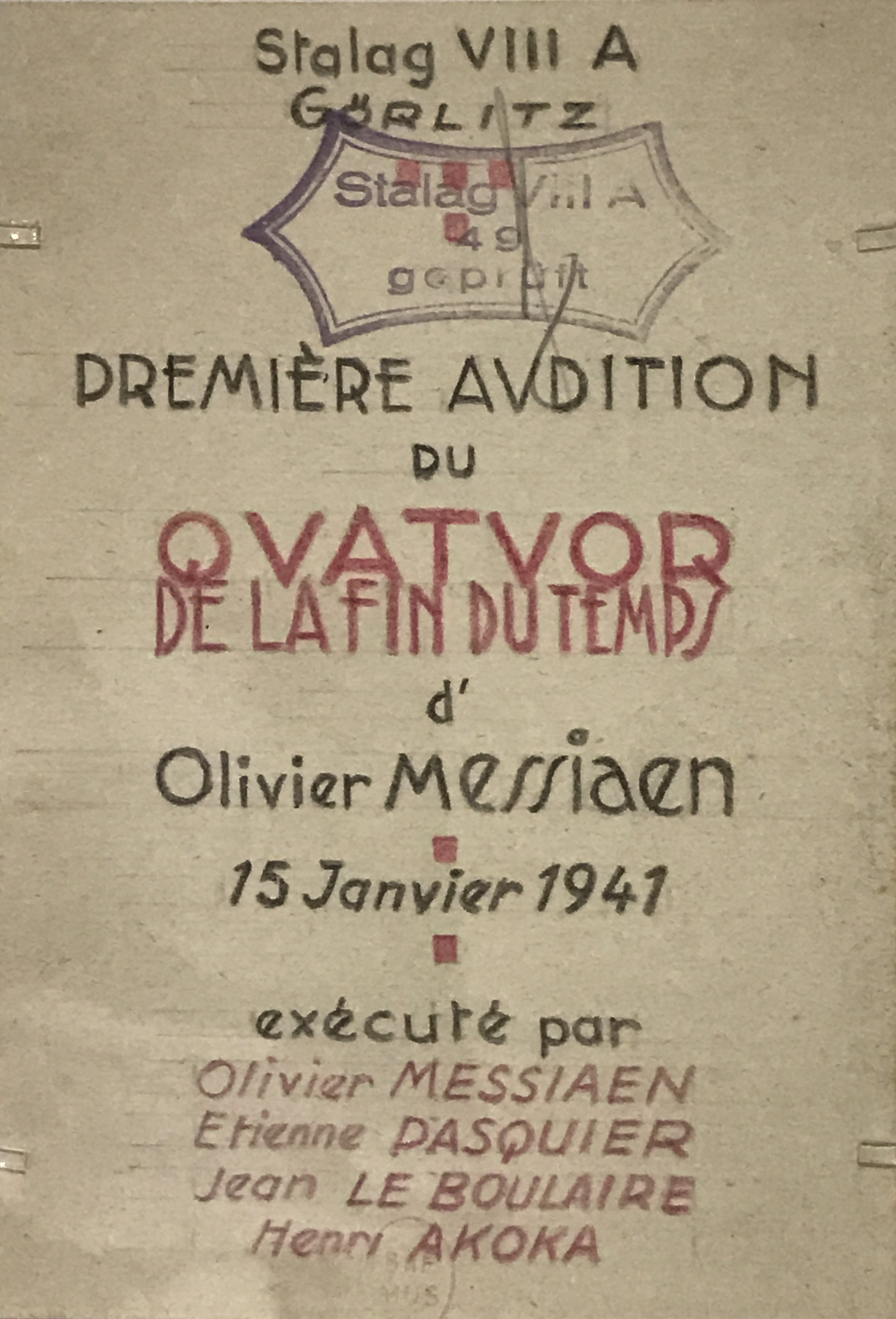
- Invitation to the premiere
- English: Quartet for the End of Time
- Composed: 1940–1941
- Dedication: "To the Angel who announces the End of Time"
- Performed: 15 January 1941: Görlitz
- Published: 1942
- Publisher: Éditions Durand
- Duration: 50 minutes
- Movements: eight
- Scoring: clarinet; violin; cello; piano

Premiere
- Date: 15 January 1941
- Location: Stalag VIII-A, Görlitz, Germany
- Performers: Jean le Boulaire (violin), Henri Akoka (clarinet), Étienne Pasquier (cello), Olivier Messiaen (piano)

Quatuor pour la fin du Temps (French pronunciation: [kwatɥɔʁ puʁ la fɛ̃ dy tɑ̃]), originally Quatuor de la fin du Temps ("Quartet of the End of Time"), also known by its English title Quartet for the End of Time, is an eight-movement piece of chamber music by the French composer Olivier Messiaen. It was premiered in 1941. The work is scored for clarinet (in B-flat), violin, cello, and piano; a typical performance of the complete work lasts about 50 minutes. Messiaen wrote the piece while a prisoner of war in German captivity and it was first performed by his fellow prisoners. It is generally considered one of his most important works.

== Composition and first performance ==
Messiaen was 31 years old when France entered World War II. He was drafted into the French army as a medical auxiliary. In June 1940, he was captured by the German army and imprisoned in Stalag VIII-A, a prisoner-of-war camp in Görlitz, Germany (now Zgorzelec, Poland). While in transit to the camp, Messiaen showed the clarinetist Henri Akoka, also a prisoner, the sketches for what would become Abîme des oiseaux. Two other professional musicians, violinist Jean le Boulaire and cellist Étienne Pasquier, were among his fellow prisoners, and after he managed to obtain some paper and a small pencil from a sympathetic guard (Carl-Albert Brüll, 1902–1989), Messiaen wrote a short trio for them; this piece later became the quartet's Intermède. Later, he decided to write for the same trio with himself at the piano, developing it into its current state. The combination of instruments was unusual at the time, but not without precedent: Walter Rabl had composed for it in 1896, as had Paul Hindemith in 1938.

The quartet was premiered at the camp on 15 January 1941 in front of about 400 prisoners and guards. Messiaen claimed that 5,000 people attended the performance and that the musicians had decrepit instruments, but those claims are now considered "somewhat exaggerated". The cello was bought with donations from camp members. Messiaen later recalled, "Never was I listened to with such rapt attention and comprehension."

Several months later, Messiaen was released (with the help of Brüll) thanks to an entreaty by his former organ teacher and professor at the Paris Conservatoire, Marcel Dupré, as Messiaen scholar Nigel Simeone writes:

Marcel Dupré's role in securing Messiaen's release was a crucial one. He later recalled how he visited Fritz Piersig (at the Propaganda-Staffel in Paris) in early 1941 to plead the case for Messiaen, and was assured that "in ten days' time, at the latest, he will be in an office". Dupré's intervention was clearly effective. An emotional letter from Messiaen to Claude Arrieu announcing his newly found freedom allows us to date his return from Silesia (via Nuremberg and Lyon) to Neussargues in the Cantal.

Messiaen and Etienne Pasquier (cellist at the initial premiere) later recorded the quartet on LP for Club Français du Disc (1956), together with Jean Pasquier (violin) and André Vacellier (clarinet).

== Inspiration ==
Messiaen wrote in the Preface to the score that the work was inspired by text from the Book of Revelation (Rev 10:1–2, 5–7, King James Version):

And I saw another mighty angel come down from heaven, clothed with a cloud: and a rainbow was upon his head, and his face was as it were the sun, and his feet as pillars of fire… and he set his right foot upon the sea, and his left foot on the earth.… And the angel which I saw stand upon the sea and upon the earth lifted up his hand to heaven, and sware by him that liveth for ever and ever… that there should be time no longer: But in the days of the voice of the seventh angel, when he shall begin to sound, the mystery of God should be finished…

== Structure ==
The work is in eight movements:

1. "Liturgie de cristal" (Crystal liturgy)
2. "Vocalise, pour l'Ange qui annonce la fin du Temps" (Vocalise, for the Angel who announces the end of Time)
3. "Abîme des oiseaux" (Abyss of the birds)
4. "Intermède" (Interlude)
5. "Louange à l'Éternité de Jésus" (Praise to the Eternity of Jesus)
6. "Danse de la fureur, pour les sept trompettes" (Dance of fury, for the seven trumpets)
7. "Fouillis d'arcs-en-ciel, pour l'Ange qui annonce la fin du Temps" (Tangle of rainbows, for the Angel who announces the end of Time)
8. "Louange à l'Immortalité de Jésus" (Praise to the Immortality of Jesus)

Below, quotations are translated from Messiaen's Preface to the score.

=== I. "Liturgie de cristal" ===
In his preface to the score, Messiaen describes the opening of the quartet:

Between three and four in the morning, the awakening of birds: a solo blackbird or nightingale improvises, surrounded by a shimmer of sound, by a halo of trills lost very high in the trees. Transpose this onto a religious plane and you have the harmonious silence of Heaven.

Written for the full quartet, the opening movement begins with the solo clarinet imitating a blackbird's song and the violin imitating a nightingale's song. The underlying pulse is provided by the cello and piano: the cello cycles through the same five-note melody (using the pitches C, E, D, F♯, and B♭) and a repeating pattern of 15 durations. The piano part consists of a 17-note rhythmic pattern permuted strictly through 29 chords, as if to give the listener a glimpse of something eternal.

=== II. "Vocalise, pour l'Ange qui annonce la fin du Temps" ===
Also for the full quartet, Messiaen writes of this movement:

The first and third parts (very short) evoke the power of this mighty angel, a rainbow upon his head and clothed with a cloud, who sets one foot on the sea and one foot on the earth. In the middle section are the impalpable harmonies of heaven. In the piano, sweet cascades of blue-orange chords, enclosing in their distant chimes the almost plainchant song of the violin and cello.

=== III. "Abîme des oiseaux" ===
Messiaen writes:

The abyss is Time with its sadness, its weariness. The birds are the opposite to Time; they are our desire for light, for stars, for rainbows, and for jubilant songs.

A solo for the clarinet, this movement is a test for even the most accomplished clarinetist, with an extremely slow tempo marking = 44. It was originally written in Verdun.

=== IV. "Intermède" ===
A trio for violin, cello, and clarinet, Messiaen writes of this movement:

Scherzo, of a more individual character than the other movements, but linked to them nevertheless by certain melodic recollections.

=== V. "Louange à l'Éternité de Jésus" ===
Messiaen writes:

Jesus is considered here as the Word. A broad phrase, "infinitely slow", on the cello, magnifies with love and reverence the eternity of the Word, powerful and gentle, "whose time never runs out". The melody stretches majestically into a kind of gentle, regal distance. "In the beginning was the Word, and Word was with God, and the Word was God." (John 1:1 (King James Version))

A duet for cello and piano, the music is arranged from an earlier composition, "VI. L'Eau" from "Fête des belles eaux" for 6 Ondes Martenots, performed at the Paris International Exposition of 1937. The tempo marking is infiniment lent, extatique ("infinitely slow, ecstatic").

=== VI. "Danse de la fureur, pour les sept trompettes" ===
An excerpt from Movement VI ("Danse de la fureur ..."), which is played by all four instruments in unison

It shows Messiaen's use of additive rhythms, in which the underlying quaver beat (eighth notes) is sometimes augmented by a semiquaver (sixteenth note). Messiaen writes of this movement, which is for full quartet:

Rhythmically, the most characteristic piece of the series. The four instruments in unison imitate gongs and trumpets (the first six trumpets of the Apocalypse followed by various disasters, the trumpet of the seventh angel announcing consummation of the mystery of God) Use of added values, of augmented or diminished rhythms, of non-retrogradable rhythms. Music of stone, formidable granite sound; irresistible movement of steel, huge blocks of purple rage, icy drunkenness. Listen especially to all the terrible fortissimo of the augmentation of the theme and changes of register of its different notes, towards the end of the piece.

Toward the end of the movement the theme returns, fortissimo, in augmentation and with wide changes of register. It is in unison throughout.

=== VII. "Fouillis d'arcs-en-ciel, pour l'Ange qui annonce la fin du Temps" ===
Messiaen writes of this quartet movement:

Recurring here are certain passages from the second movement. The angel appears in full force, especially the rainbow that covers him (the rainbow, symbol of peace, wisdom, and all luminescent and sonorous vibration). – In my dreams, I hear and see ordered chords and melodies, known colors and shapes; then, after this transitional stage, I pass through the unreal and suffer, with ecstasy, a tournament; a roundabout co-penetration of superhuman sounds and colors. These swords of fire, this blue-orange lava, these sudden stars: there is the tangle, there are the rainbows!

=== VIII. "Louange à l'Immortalité de Jésus" ===
Messiaen writes:

Large violin solo, counterpart to the violoncello solo of the 5th movement. Why this second eulogy? It is especially aimed at the second aspect of Jesus, Jesus the Man, the Word made flesh, immortally risen for our communication of his life. It is all love. Its slow ascent to the acutely extreme is the ascent of man to his god, the child of God to his Father, the being made divine towards Paradise.

A duet for violin and piano, the music is an arrangement of the second part of his earlier organ piece "Diptyque" (1930), transposed up a major third from C to E.

== Homages in later works ==
The piece is the inspiration for Quartet for the End of Time, a 2014 novel by Johanna Skibsrud that borrows its title and structure from the piece.

Minnesota composer Steve Heitzeg's 2025 chamber-music work Variations on Peace was inspired by Quatuor pour la fin du temps.

== Primary sources ==
- Olivier Messiaen, Quatuor pour la fin du temps (score) (Paris: Durand)
- Anthony Pople, Messiaen: Quatuor pour la fin du temps, Cambridge Music Handbooks (Cambridge University Press, 2003)
