= Étienne Pasquier (cellist) =

French cellist

Étienne Pasquier (1905 – 14 December 1997) was a French cellist.

Pasquier was born on 10 May 1905 in Tours. He entered the Paris Conservatory in 1918 at age 13 and received a first prize in cello in 1921.

From 1927, Étienne Pasquier was a member of the Pasquier Trio with his brothers Jean and Pierre.

Pasquier was imprisoned at Stalag VIII-A during the Second World War. While there he performed in the 15 January 1941 premiere of Quatuor pour la fin du temps by composer Olivier Messiaen, also an inmate at the camp, with Jean le Boulaire (violinist) and Henri Akoka (clarinettist). Messiaen and Pasquier were released from the camp less than one month after the premier of the Quartet.

In 1959, the Trio made a tour in Southern Africa.

Étienne Pasquier died on 14 December 1997 at the age of 92.
