= Alfred Loewenguth =

French classical violinist

Alfred Loewenguth (15 June 1911 – 11 November 1983) was a 20th-century French classical violinist.

Loewenguth began learning the violin at age 8 and had his first student at 12. At 16, he entered the Conservatoire de Paris and started his violin school at 17. At 19, he won the first prize at the Conservatoire de Paris and the first medals of chamber music and solfège. There, he was a pupil of André Tourret and Jean Roger-Ducasse for chamber music.

In 1929, he created the Loewenguth Quartet to which later also belonged his brother, cellist Roger Loewenguth. But the Loewenguth Quartet's "grand formation" was composed of Alfred Loewenguth (1st violin), Maurice Fueri (2nd violin), Roger Roche (viola) and Pierre Basseux (cello). This string quartet enjoyed an international reputation and recorded numerous discs from Johann Sebastian Bach to Darius Milhaud, with a preference for Joseph Haydn, Mozart, Beethoven and French music. He won a Grand Prix du disque for the quartets by Claude Debussy and Maurice Ravel (Deutsche Grammophon).

In 1959, he founded the "Orchestres de jeunes Alfred Loewenguth" (OJAL), and created the Sceaux Orangerie music festival in 1969.

He also founded and directed the 9th arrondissement of Paris conservatory, taught at the Stuttgart conservatory, the Schola Cantorum de Paris, and the International Academy of Nice.

Although he devoted most of his musical activity to pedagogy and chamber music, with his quartet or as a duo (for more than fifty years with pianist Françoise Doreau), he also had a career as a soloist. The film director Benoît Jacquot devoted a documentary "Enfance Musique" to him in 1979.
