= Jean-Claude Pennetier =

French classical pianist (born 1942)

Jean-Claude Pennetier (born 16 May 1942) is a French classical pianist. He is an advocate for the contemporary classical music of France, having premiered music by Philippe Hersant, Michel Merlet and Maurice Ohana.

== Biography ==
Jean-Claude Pennetier was born on 16 May 1942 in Châtellerault, France. Pennetier began studying the piano at the age of three and later entered the Conservatoire de Paris in piano and chamber music classes. After having passed several international competitions, he began a solo career which led him to perform abroad. In the early 1970s, he temporarily interrupted this career to devote himself to composition and conducting. He also took advantage of this period to deepen his repertoire and his reflection on music. He became interested in musical theatre, writing operas for children, the pianoforte. He is also passionate about chamber music and contemporary classical music. He conducts the Ensemble intercontemporain, the Ensemble 2e2m and from 1995, he teaches at the Conservatoire de Paris. He has premiered works by Philippe Hersant, Maurice Ohana, Pascal Dusapin, Nicolas Zourabichvili among other composers of the XX that he likes. He is currently invited in France and abroad as soloist with renowned orchestras: the Orchestre de Paris, Dresden Staatskapelle, NHK de Tokyo, etc. He regularly is the guest of the Festival de La Roque-d'Anthéron, that of Prades, Pyrénées-Orientales, the Chopin Festival at the Château de Bagatelle, the Summer Musical Season of Sceaux, the Printemps des Arts of Monte-Carlo etc. He performs each season in Canada and the United States to play with orchestra, in recital or in a chamber ensemble.

Pennetier is a particularly an advocate for French contemporary classical music, having premiered music by Philippe Hersant, Michel Merlet and Maurice Ohana. He has also played with various new music ensembles, including Domaine Musical and the Ensemble Ars Nova.

Pennetier holds the ranks of Chevalier of the Légion d'honneur and Officier of the Ordre des Arts et des Lettres.

Finally, his spiritual journey led him, in 2004, to be ordained priest of the Orthodox Church (within the Romanian Orthodox metropolis of Western and Southern Europe). He is currently rector of the parish of Chartres.

He is Valérie Soudères's daughter "France" husband.

== Prizes ==
- 1st Prizes for piano and chamber music at the Conservatoire.
- 1er Prize Gabriel Fauré,
- 2e Prize Long-Thibaud-Crespin Competition
- 1st Prize of the Concours de Montréal.
- 1st nominated at the Geneva International Music Competition (1968)
- Lauréate of the Marguerite Long competition
- Grand Prix of the Académie Charles Cros in 1999 for Schubert's sonata in B flat major.

== Selected recordings ==
- Works by Brahms, Schumann, Debussy, Beethoven (Lyrinx); Schubert (sonata in B flat major)
- Ravel (chamber music), Saphir Productions
- Mozart, with Michel Portal and the Ysaÿe quartet, Aeon.(2006)
- Schubert's Trios, with Régis Pasquier and Roland Pidoux, Harmonia Mundi
- Hyacinthe Jadin's Sonatas for pianoforte (on a period instrument)
- Maurice Ohana's Concerto for piano and orchestra, orchestre philharmonique du Luxembourg, Arturo Tamayo, Timpani (1997)
- Maurice Ohana's 3 Caprices, 24 Préludes; Arion (1989)
- Gabriel Fauré's complete work for piano - vols. 1, 2, 3 and 4; Mirare 2009 - 2011 - 2015 - 2018. Diapason d'or.
