= Françoise Doreau =

French pianist

Françoise Doreau (born 2 March 1910 – died 20 July 2011 at age 101) was a French classical pianist.

== Life ==
Doreau began studying piano at a very young age and entered the Conservatoire de Paris in Marguerite Long's class at the age of 13, where she won a second prize for piano in 1928. She also attended Max d'Ollone's ensemble classes.

After performing as a soloist, she devoted herself entirely to the repertoire of chamber music. At the conservatory, she was an accompanist for the violin classes of André Tourret, Line Talluel, Roland Charmy and Pierre Amoyal. She toured Vietnam with Brigitte de Beaufond.

It was André Tourret who advised a young 19-year-old violinist, Alfred Loewenguth, to team up with pianist Doreau. The two artists collaborated with the same enthusiasm for more than fifty years. This long work together was an essential factor in achieving a communion of spirit and a technical achievement that could guarantee the balance of expression of the two instruments. The duet successfully gave numerous concerts in France and abroad (Germany, England, etc.). It possessed almost all the repertoire of classical and romantic sonatas (complete sonatas by Mozart, Beethoven, Brahms...). Doreau also very often joined the quartet "IIIe Quatuor À Cordes" to play works from the repertoire with piano.
