= Bruno Pasquier =

French violist (born 1943)

Bruno Pasquier (born 10 December 1943 in Neuilly-sur-Seine), is a French violist, the son of Pierre Pasquier, also a violist.

== Biography ==
After a First Prize at the Conservatoire de Paris in 1961, Pasquier won the ARD International Music Competition in 1965. From 1965 to 1985, he was first soloist in the Paris Opera orchestra and subsequently, from 1985 to 1990 at the Orchestre national de France.

Since 1970, he has been teaching at the Conservatoire de Paris, first as assistant to Serge Collot, then as viola and chamber music teacher (since 1983).

With his brother Régis Pasquier (violinist and conductor) and cellist Roland Pidoux, he was for a while a member of a sought-after trio.

Bruno Pasquier plays a viola by Paolo Maggini (early seventeenth).
