= Shani Diluka =

Monegasque pianist

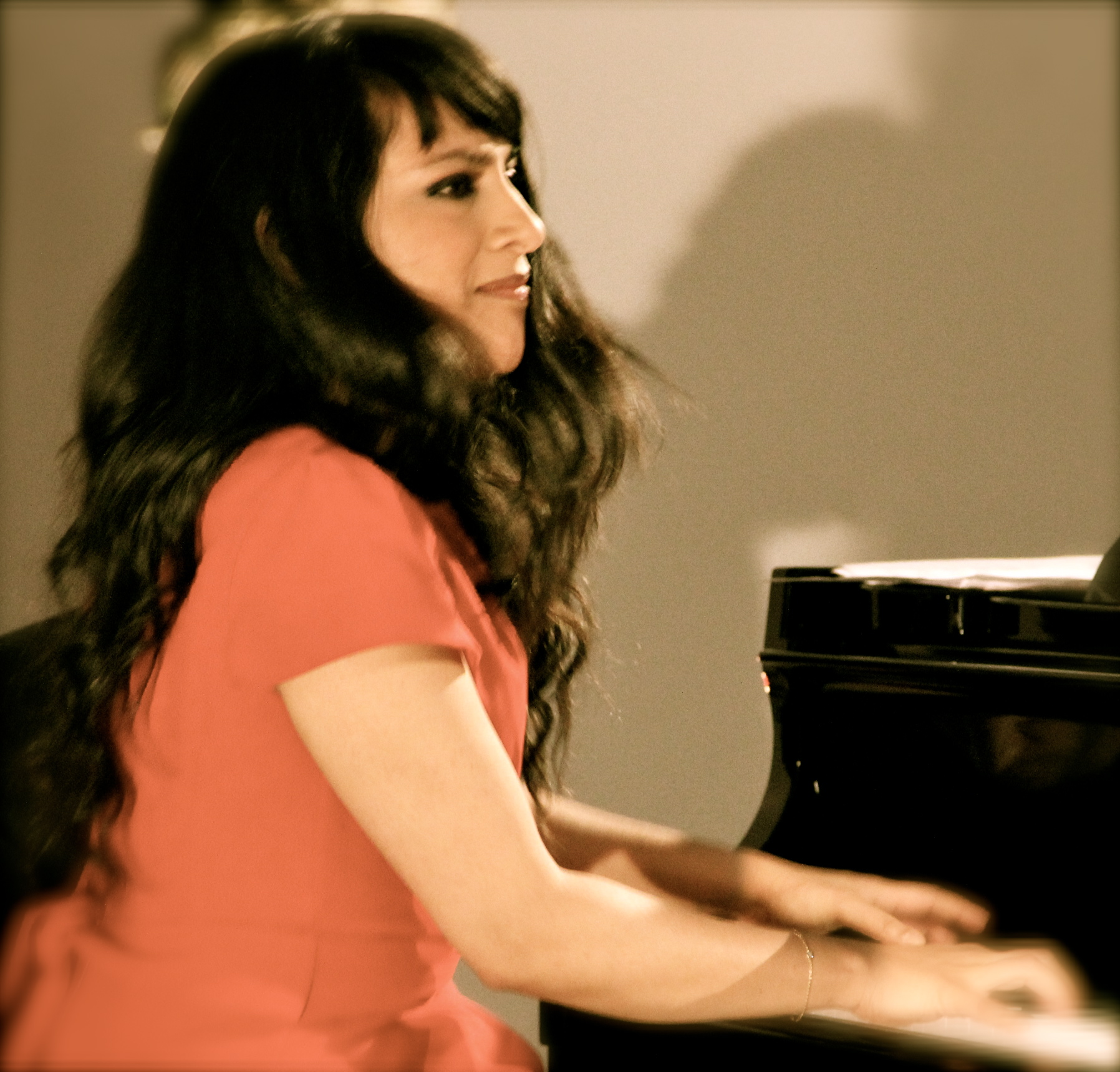
Shani Diluka

Shani Diluka (born 7 November 1976 in Monaco) is a Monegasque pianist of Sri Lankan descent. She was among those to benefit from a programme initiated by Princess Grace of Monaco, which allowed children to receive music lessons integrated into their schooling. She received the first prize in the Académie de Musique (Fondation Prince Rainier III). She subsequently studied with Odile Poisson, a pupil of Pierre Sancan. Enrolled in the Conservatoire de Paris in 1997, she studied with Georges Pludermacher and François-Frédéric Guy and later with Marie-Françoise Bucquet, Nicholas Angelich and Bruno Rigutto.

== Biography ==
Born in Monaco to Sri Lankan parents, she came to notice at the age of six thanks to a programme set up by Princess Grace of Monaco and was then chosen to take part in a specialised programme at the Académie Prince Rainier III in the Principality. She later entered the CNSMD in Paris, where she won a first prize, with the unanimity of the jury, after being advised by B. Rigutto, G. Pludermacher, M.-F. Bucquet and J. Chaminé. In 2005, when she joined the Fondation de Come, presided over by Martha Argerich.

== Discography ==
- Tempéraments with the Orchestre de chambre de Paris conducted by Ben Glassberg. Pieces of C. P. E. Bach et W. A. Mozart performed on modern piano and on a copy of Walter 1790 thanks to the Fondation Royaumont. (Mirare / Harmonia Mundi 2019)
- La Symphonie des oiseaux with the violinist Geneviève Laurenceau and the bird singers Jean Boucault et Johnny Rasse. Pieces of W. A. Mozart, P. Casals, R. Schumann, C. Saint-Saëns, E. Grieg, O. Messiaen, P. I. Tchaikovsky and others... (Mirare / Harmonia Mundi 2017)
- Beethoven - Complete works for cello and piano with the cellist Valentin Erben. Sonatas and Variations of Ludwig van Beethoven. (Mirare / Harmonia Mundi 2017)
- Schubert - Des Fragments aux étoiles 12 Ländler D790, Hungarian Melody, Sonata in B flat major D960 of Franz Schubert (Mirare / Harmonia Mundi 2016)
- Babar et le Père Noël (livre-CD) Natalie Dessay, accompanied by the pianist Shani Diluka, tells the story of Babar and Father Christmas with pieces of C. Saint-Saëns, E. Satie, C. Debussy, M. Ravel, G. Bizet and, of course, F. Poulenc with the original text of Jean de Brunhoff. (La Dolce Volta 2012)
- ROAD 66 with Natalie Dessay. Pieces of J. Adams, S. Barber, A. Beach, L. Bernstein, J. Cage, A. Copland, B. Evans, A. Ginastera, G. Gershwin, P. Glass, P. Grainger, K.hJarrett, H. Joo, C. Porter (Mirare / Harmonia Mundi 2014)
- Beethoven Concertos. Concertos 1 op. 15 & 2 op. 19 of Ludwig van Beethoven with the Orchestre National Bordeaux Aquitaine conducted by Kwame Ryan (Mirare / Harmonia Mundi 2010)
- Romances sans paroles - Variations sérieuses - Fantaisie écossaise. Pieces of Felix Mendelssohn (Mirare / Harmonia Mundi 2009)
- Concerto et pièces lyriques de Edvard Grieg with the Orchestre National Bordeaux Aquitaine conducted by Eivind Gullberg Jensen (Mirare / Harmonia Mundi 2007)
- Histoire de Babar le Petit Éléphant. Natalie Dessay, accompanied by the pianist Shani Diluka, tells the story of Babar with the music of Francis Poulenc and the original text of Jean de Brunhoff. (Didier Jeunesse 2012)
- Monsieur Chopin ou le voyage de la note bleu, Artist: Shani Diluka, Reciter: Jacques Bonnaffé, Text: Carl Norac, Music: Frédéric Chopin, Illustration: Delphine Jacquot (Didier Jeunesse 2010)
- Best Of La Roque d'Anthéron Festival : Shani Diluka Mirare / Harmonia Mundi after others as: Nicholas Angelich, Boris Berezovsky, Brigitte Engerer, Andrei Korobeinikov, Jean-Frédéric Neuburger, Jean-Claude Pennetier (Mirare / Harmonia Mundi 2007, 2008, 2009, 2010, 2011, 2012, 2013, 2014, 2015, 2016)
- Les Salons de Musique ARTE, with the participation of: Olivier Charlier, Bijan Chemirani, Serena Fisseau, Victor Hugo Villena, Rosemary Standley, Rémy Cardinale, Quatuor Ardeo, Henri Demarquette, Shani Diluka, Camille Thomas, Vincent Peirani, Valentin Erben and others. (Outhere Music, 2014)
- La Folle Journée fête ses 20 ans, La Folle Journée de Nantes, with the participation of: Anne Queffélec, Zhu Xiao-Mei, Michel Corboz, Augustin Dumay, Romain Guyot, Boris Berezovsky, La Rêveuse, Tatjana Vassiljeva, Brigitte Engerer, Jean-Frédéric Neuburger, Claire-Marie Le Guay, Claire Désert, Emmanuel Strosser, Emmanuel Rossfelder, Lucero Tena, Luis Fernando Pérez, Ricercar Consort, Philippe Pierlot, Carlos Mena, Shani Diluka, Pierre Hantaï, Renegades Steel Band Orchestra, Sinfonia Varsovia and others.

== Rewards ==
=== Tempéraments disc (Mirare Harmonia Mundi - 2019) ===
- France Musique Choice
- 4 F from Télérama
- CD des Tages Radio Klassik

=== Beethoven - Complete works for cello and piano disc (Mirare Harmonia Mundi - 2017) ===
- 5 DIAPASON Magazine

=== Schubert - Des Fragments aux étoiles disc (Mirare Harmonia Mundi - 2016) ===
- 5 DIAPASON Magazine
- France Musique Choice
- Musikzen best reward
- "Clef du mois" de ResMusica
- Best choice of the FNAC record shop

=== Road 66 disc (Mirare Harmonia Mundi - 2014) ===
- Bayerischer Rundfunk CD Tipp
- Berlin Kultur Radio KKKK
- Norman Lebrecht Choice
- FIP Choice
- 4 stars CLASSICA

=== Beethoven concertos disc (Mirare Harmonia Mundi - 2010) ===
- GRAMOPHONE recommendation
- 5 DIAPASON Magazine
- CHOC du monde de la Musique
- Japan Music Arena award for the best performance of the year
- USA Fanfare magazine recommendation
- Musikzen best reward

=== Mendelssohn - Romances sans paroles disc (Mirare Harmonia Mundi- 2009) ===
- 5 DIAPASON Magazine
- ARTE choice of the month and of the year
- MEZZO Choice
- CHOC du Monde de la Musique

=== Disque Concertos et Pièces Lyriques de Grieg (Mirare Harmonia Mundi - 2007) ===
- 5 DIAPASON Magazine
- France Musique Choice
- CHOC du monde de la Musique
- RTL d'Or
- 4 stars German Bayern
- 10/10 Classic Today USA

=== Other rewards ===
- Choice of Charles Cros for Mr Chopin (Edition Didier Jeunesse) and Babar (Edition Didier Jeunesse)
- Knight of the Order of Cultural Merit of Monaco on 18 November 2018
