= Ile de France International Piano Competition =

The Ile de France International Piano Competition was founded in 1999 in Sartrouville (France) on the initiative of René Girard and his daughter Christine Girard under the honorary presidency of Anne Queffelec.The Society Opus Yvelines organizes annually this contest with the support of the city of Maisons-Laffitte and the General Council of the Yvelines.

== Competition ==
The Ile de France International Piano Competition includes fifteen various competition levels. It is open to candidates of all levels and nationalities without age limit, except for the "Concert Pianist" Category for which the upper limit is 32 years. It offers all candidates a free program ranging from 15 to 45 minutes according to the various categories. Awards are prizes (6000 € in 2012) and concerts in France and Hungary.

== Historical record ==
- 1999: First "Ile de France National Piano Competition"
- 2005: The contest was named "Ile de France International Piano Competition" of the city of Maisons-Laffitte
- 2008: An Adult Amateur category is created. It applies to pianists whose activity is not related to the professional practice of the instrument.
- 2009: Qualifyling auditions were created for the Concert Pianist category in order to select six/eight finalists. Accommodation was provided with host families, specifically for distant candidates.

== Jury ==
The members of the jury are selected by Anne Queffelec, because of their name, their competence and integrity. The members of the jury since 1999: Florence Aramburu, Jacqueline Bensimhon, Anne Billant, Brigitte Bouthinon-Dumas, Catherine Brilli, France Clidat, Claire Désert, Laurence Garcin, Anne-Lise Gastaldi, Valérie Halluc, Cécile Hugonnard-Roche, Victoria Melki, Florence Pavie, Anne Queffélec, Juliette Régnault, Marie-Paule Siruguet, Emmanuelle Swiercz, Pascal Amoyel (France), William Bensimhon, Laurent Cabasso, Vincent Coq, Geoffroy Couteau, Olivier Gardon, Christian Ivaldi, Philippe Larguèze, Pascal Mantin, Gérard Parmentier, Denis Pascal (France), Bruno Rigutto, Eric Vidonne, Simon Zaoui, Dharam Patwardhan, André Gorog, Robert Leonardy, Billy Eidi, Jean-Paul Sevilla, Célimène Daudet, Chantal Stigliani, Xénia Maliarevitch, Konstanze Eickhorst, Christian Erbslöh, Lilya Boyadieva, Chara Iacovidou, Karolos Zouganelis, Irène Polya, Gabriella Torma, Karoly Mocsari, Edda Erlensdottir, Fernando Rossano, Haruhi Hata, Megumi DoÏ, Tamas Vesmas, Rena Suereshevskaya.

== Winners (Concert Pianist Category) ==
- 1999: not awarded
- 2000: Jean-Frédéric Neuburger (France)
- 2001: Alexandre Grelot (France)
- 2002: Daria Fadeeva (Belarus/France)
- 2003: Rintaro Akamatsu (Japan)
- 2004: Kanae Endo (Japan)
- 2005: Masao Kitsutaka (Japan)
- 2006: Suzanna Bartal (Romania), Hiroko Tani (Japan)
- 2007: Alexeï Lebedev (Russia)
- 2008: Duanduan Hao (China),
- 2009: Seul Ki Cheon (South Korea)
- 2010: Mantautas Katinas (Lithuania)
- 2011: Miyeon Lee (South Korea)
- 2012: Yun-Yang Lee (Taiwan)
- 2013: Charlotte Coulaud (France)
- 2014: Marcell Szabó (Hungary)
- 2015 : Ryutaro Suzuki (Japan)
