= Geneviève Laurenceau =

French classical violinist (born 1977)

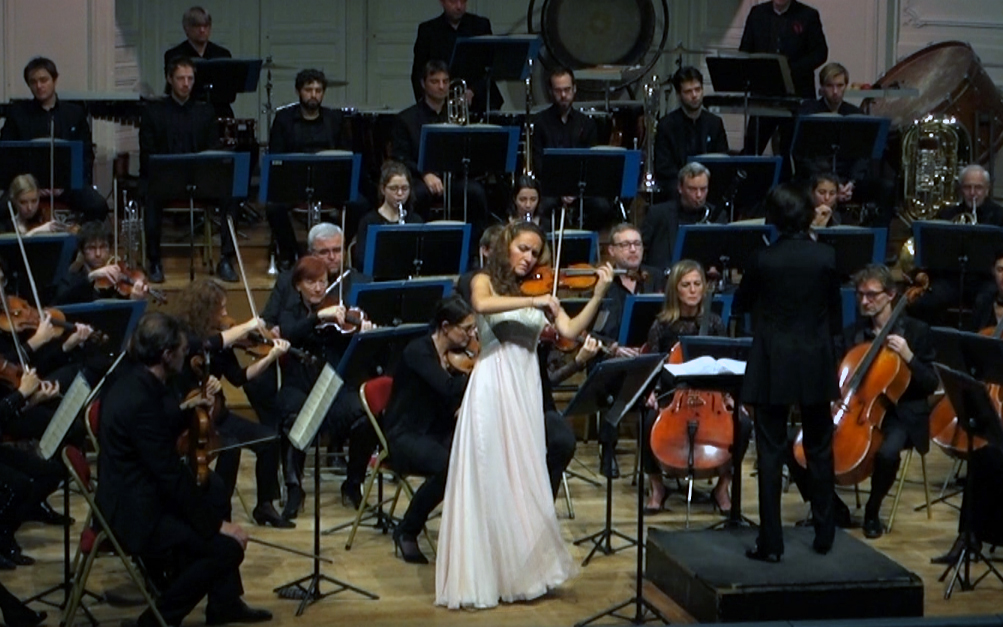
Laurenceau in concert at Salle Gaveau, November 2018.

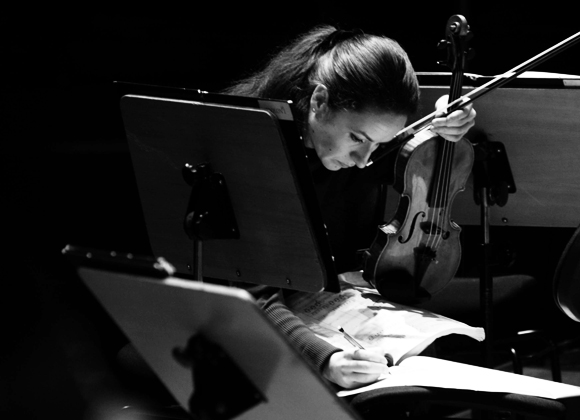

Geneviève Laurenceau (born 2 November 1977) is a French classical violinist. She was a supersoloist with the Orchestre national du Capitole de Toulouse from 2007 to 2017.

== Life ==
Born in Strasbourg, Laurenceau began playing the violin at the age of 3 and started performing at the age of 9 with the philharmonic chamber orchestra of her hometown. She followed the lessons of Wolfgang Marschner and Zakhar Bron in Germany, then perfected her skills with Jean-Jacques Kantorow in Rotterdam.

After several international successes and a First Prize at the Novosibirsk International Competition (Russia), she won the Grand Prize of the Maurice Ravel International Academy in Saint-Jean-de-Luz in September 2001. The following year, she won the 5th "Le violon de l'Adami" competition and made a CD on this occasion, with pianist Jean-Frédéric Neuburger.

== Career ==
Laurenceau is invited to perform as a soloist with French and international orchestras, under the direction of conductors such as François-Xavier Roth, Michel Plasson, Tugan Sokhiev, Ilan Volkov, Kees Bakels, Walter Weller, Jean-Jacques Kantorow, Frédéric Lodéon… She devotes herself to chamber music alongside Stephen Kovacevich, Philippe Jaroussky, Jean-Frédéric Neuburger, Tatjana Vassiljeva, Emmanuel Rossfelder, Bertrand Chamayou, Lise Berthaud, David Bismuth, Johan Farjot, Arnaud Thorette and Antoine Pierlot. She is the founder and a member of the Smoking Josephine Quintet with Olivia Hughes, Marie Chilemme, Hermine Horiot and Laurène Durantel.

She works with composers such as Karol Beffa, who dedicated "Supplique" for solo violin to her, Nicolas Bacri, Bruno Mantovani and Philippe Hersant, for whom she premiered "Nostalgia", a work for violin and choir. Benjamin Attahir also dedicated to her "Nachtspiel" for violin and orchestra. She performs in festivals in France - such as Strasbourg, Colmar, Prades, Les Serres d'Auteuil, the Midem in Cannes - and abroad - Kuhmo (Finland), MDR in Dresden, NDR in Hamburg, Mehta Foundation in Bombay... and in places like the Philharmonie de Paris, La Seine Musicale, the Auditorium of Radio France, the Théâtre du Châtelet, the Salle Gaveau, the Halle aux Grains de Toulouse, the Arsenal de Metz, the Opéra-Théâtre d'Avignon, the Métropole de Lausanne the Centre for Fine Arts, Brussels, the Tapiola in Helsinki, the Palacio.

As a teacher, Laurenceau is invited to the academies of Annecy and Dartington (England), where she performs alongside pianist Stephen Kovacevich. She is also a professor and supervises the master classes at the Philippe Jaroussky musical Academy.

Laurenceau is President and artistic director of the Obernai Chamber Music Festival, which she created in 2009.

== Awards ==
- Diapason d'Or for her CD dedicated to Albéric Magnard (December 2015)

== Discography ==
- Paris 1900 with David Bismuth, piano
- La symphonie des Oiseaux with Shani Diluka, les Chanteurs d'oiseaux
- Rabl: Chamber Music with Wenzel Fuchs clarinet, Laurenceau violin, Laszlo Fenyö cello, Oliver Triendl piano
- Albéric Magnard: Trio pour piano, Sonate pour violon with Maximilien Horning (cello) and Olivier Triendl (piano).
- Prokoviev's Concerto for violin n° 2 with the Orchestre National du Capitole de Toulouse conducted by Tugan Sokhiev (Naïve Records).
- Brahms' Sonatas, with Johan Farjot (Zig-zag Territoires) / 5 diapason
- Mozart's Quatuor et Quintette avec hautbois
- André Gedalge: Instrumental pieces and mélodies
- Durosoir: musique pour violon et piano
- Quintette by César Franck and Piano Quartet Op. 30 by Ernest Chausson, with the Musique Oblique Ensemble (Alphée, ffff Télérama, choc du Monde de la Musique)
- G. Fauré's Piano Quartet and La Bonne Chanson, with the ensemble Contraste and Karine Deshayes (Zig-zag Territoires).
- Masques, complete chamber music by Karol Beffa, with the ensemble Contrast (Triton).
- Café 1930, tangos by Piazzolla, Gardel... with the Ensemble Contraste (Zig-zag Territoires).
