= Vincent Lucas =

French musician (born 1967)

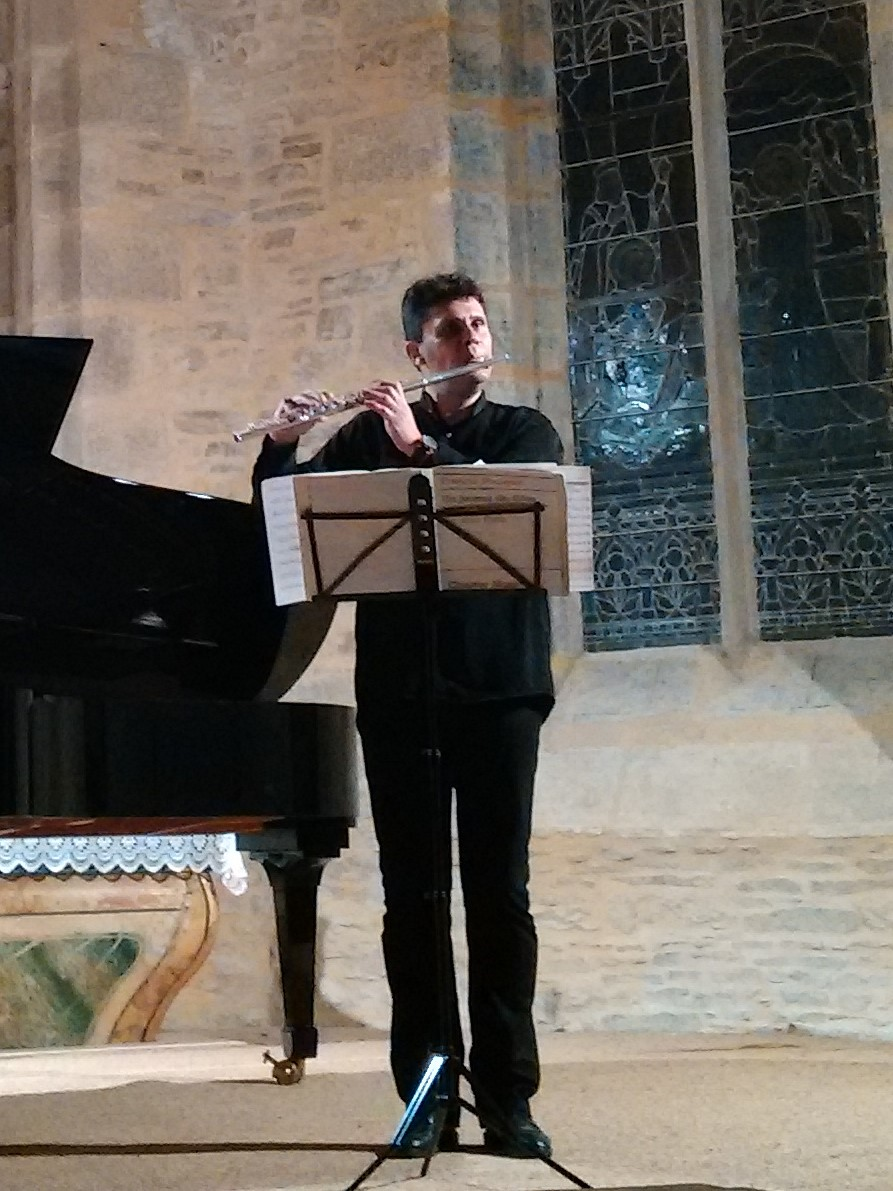
- Concert of the musical cycle of the chapel of Kersaint in Landunvez
- Born: 1967 (age 58–59)
- Education: Conservatoire à rayonnement régional de Clermont-Ferrand
- Occupation: transverse flute player.
- Awards: Prague International Radio Competition

Vincent Lucas (born in 1967) is a French classical transverse flute player.

== International career ==
Lucas began studying the transverse flute at the age of 8 at the Clermont-Ferrand Conservatory.

In 1981 joined the Conservatoire de Paris (CNSMDP) as a first appointed.

In 1984 he was awarded the Prague International Radio Competition. (Concertino Praga).

From 1984, he was a flutist for 5 years with the Orchestre du Capitole de Toulouse. Then, from 1989, he was second flutist and solo piccolo within the Berlin Philharmonic for 6 years.

He has been the principal flute soloist of the Orchestre de Paris since 1994. He is a member of the wind quintet of the soloists of the orchestre de Paris.

In parallel he is regularly called by different orchestras for replacements.

The passage in these various orchestras allowed him to play in concert venues recognized for their prestige: Musikverein of Vienna, Royal Albert Hall of London, Concertgebouw in Amsterdam, Suntory Hall of Tokyo, Carnegie Hall in New-York are but a few examples.

Lucas also leads a career as chamber music musician.

== Educational activities ==
Lucas has been teaching at the Conservatoire à rayonnement régional de Paris (CRR) as main professor since 1999. He has also been teaching at the Conservatoire de Paris (CNSMDP) since 1995 as assistant professor.

Every year he teaches at the Académie internationale d'été de Nice.

In addition he gives master classes in France and in the world notably in Germany, England, Denmark, Serbia, Turkiye, Italy, Japan, Korea, China, Taiwan, United States.

Finally, he is emeritus professor at the Toho Gakuen School of Music in Tokyo.

== Discography ==
Lucas has made several recordings under the Indesens label:

- Saint-Saëns (Intégrale): Les solistes de l'orchestre de Paris. 2010. Best recording of the year at the 2011 Victoires de la Musique.
- Poulenc: Claire Désert, Emmanuel Strosser, soloists of the Orchestre de Paris – Complete chamber music with wind instruments. 2010. Choc classica. 4 keys Télérama.
- Poulenc, Messiaen, Gabriel Fauré, Debussy. Vincent Lucas, Emmanuel Strosser.
- Gaubert. Chamber music with flute. With Laurent Wagschal.
- Jean Françaix: Le gai Paris, for trumpet and winds (1974), Divertissements and sonatas.
- Debussy. Multi artistes. Chamber music with wind instruments.
- Bach, Poulenc, Debussy, Hindemith. Vincent Lucas Alone.
- Karol Beffa. Multi artistes. Chamber music with wind instruments.

== See also ==
- Transverse flute
