= Anne Gastinel =

French cellist and professor (born 1971)

- Born: 14 October 1971 (age 54); Tassin-la-Demi-Lune, France
- Genres: Classical; Baroque
- Occupations: Cellist; Professor
- Instrument: Cello
- Years active: 1981–present

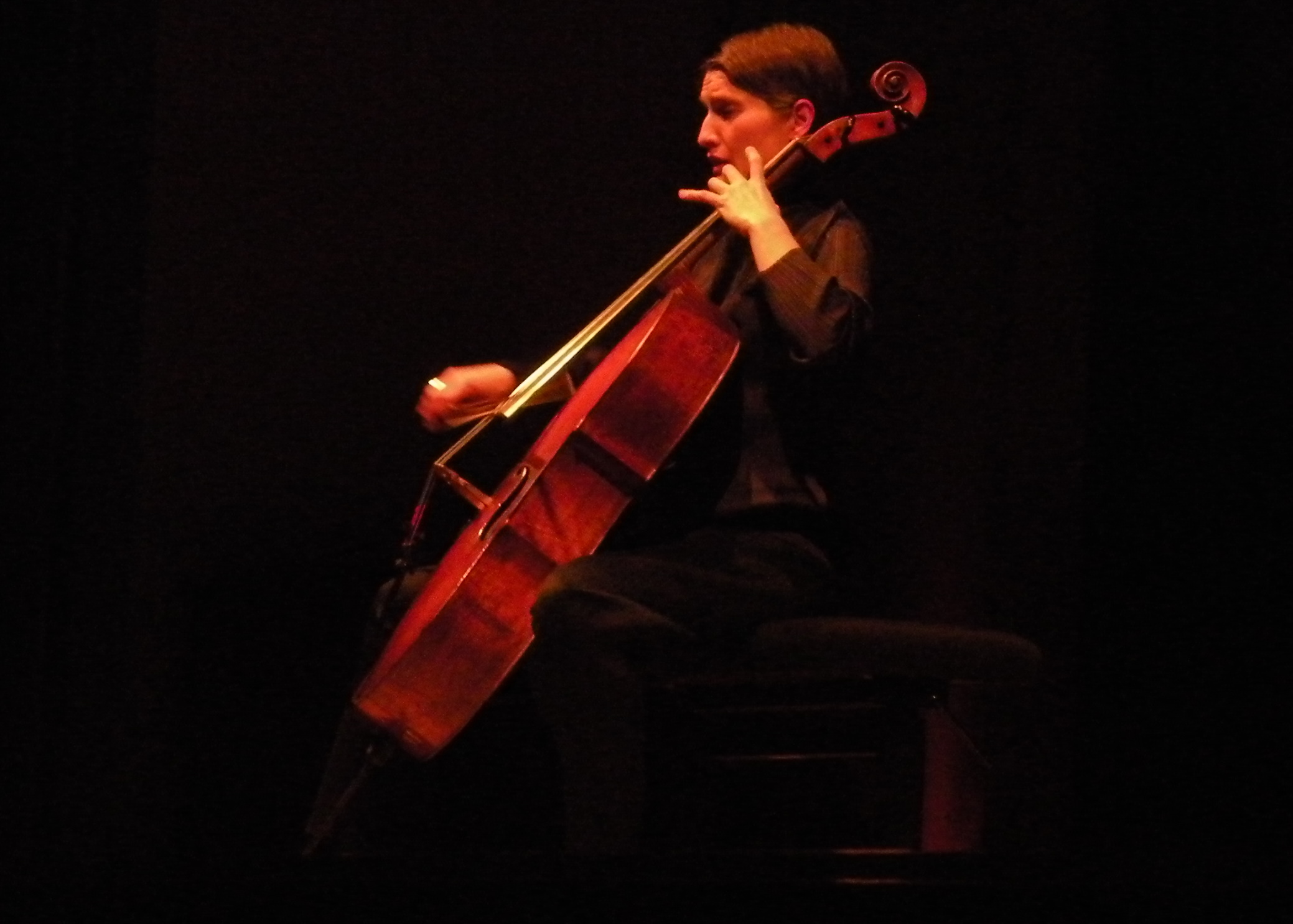
Anne Gastinel at the La Folle Journée in 2009

Anne Gastinel (born 14 October 1971) is a French cellist and professor.

== Life and career ==
Gastinel was born in Tassin-la-Demi-Lune, a town close to Lyon.

Her musical career started at the age of four when she began playing one of her sister's cellos as well as began studying the piano and oboe. Her first televised concert with an orchestra was at the age of ten where she was a soloist (1981). One year after her televised solo, Gastinel entered the Lyons Conservatory School to begin her formal music education. At age 15 (1986), Gastinel finished first place in her class at the Lyon conservatory, then moved on to study at the Paris conservatory. In Paris her teachers included famous musicians and fellow cellists such as Yo-Yo Ma, Paul Tortelier, and János Starker; all of whom made an impression on her and her musical style.

In 1990 Gastinel competed in the Eurovision Tournament in Vienna, where she represented France. She has participated in many more international contests since then and did well in several including the Cheveningen, Prague, and Rostropovich Competitions. Gastinel was the first French artist to reach the finals in the Prague International Competition in forty years and won first place in the International Competition of Scheveningen. By the age of eighteen (1989), she had already performed in more than fifty European cities, before beginning a worldwide solo career. Among other notable venues, she has played at Santori Hall in Tokyo Japan, Victoria Hall in Geneva Switzerland, Berlin Konzerthaus in Germany, the Théâtre des Champs Elysées in Paris, France, and Victoria Hall in London, England.

Gastinel has been awarded many prizes for her performances and albums. She was named “Victore of Music” in all three categories of competition; most inspirational, best track of the year, and soloist of the year. She is the only musician who has completed this feat. She also has received awards early on in her musical career such as “Most Promising Young Talent” in 1994 and Best Recording of the year in 1995 as well as the Prix-Fnac in 1995 and 2000. She was named “Woman of Gold” in 2002 for her work in the performing arts category. In 1997, Gastinel was named the Ambassador of French cello and thus was chosen to play Pablo Casal's Goffriller cello (valued at 5 million francs) for one year by Pablo Casal's wife, New Yorker Marta Casals-Istomin. Currently, she plays on a 1690 Testore cello given to her by the Fonds Instrumental Francais Association. She has recorded 14 albums since 1989 and many of them have been collaborations. She is mainly associated with the recording label Naive but she has also worked with the record labels Valois and Ottavo. Gastinel has worked with several pianists including François-Frédéric Guy on several different albums and Claire Désert on her album Schubert: Arpeggione in 2006. She has also collaborated with a guitarist named Pablo Marquez on her Spanish influenced album, Iberica, in 2009. Gastinel mainly plays classical and baroque music and has played many pieces by famous musicians such as Haydn, Rachmaninov, Brahms, Strauss, Dvorak, Bach, Beethoven, and Debussy. Gastinel is still an active musician and has been invited to be a soloist at the Choeur Britten concert on the 15th of April 2014.

Gastinel has played pieces in famous concert halls, she has played under the direction of several famous conductors, and she also has played with many other talented musicians including but not limited to German conductor Kurt Sanderling, French conductor Emmanuel Krivine, Russian conductor Semyon Bychkov, Israeli conductor Pinchas Steinberg, Russian violinist Yuri Bashmet, and English violinist Lord Yehudi Menuhin.

Gastinel has been a professor at the Lyon National Conservatory of Music and Dance since 2003. This is the same school where she started her formal musical education many years earlier. She is married and has two children.
