= Emmanuelle Swiercz =

French classical pianist (born 1978)

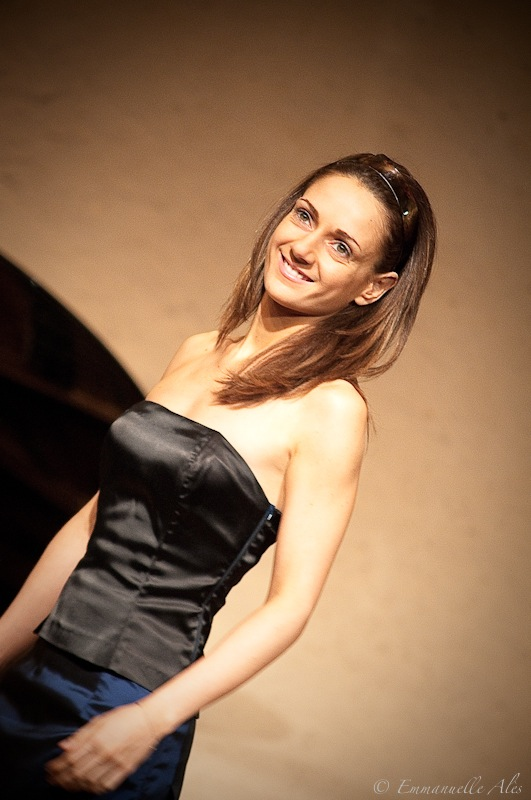

Background information
- Born: December 1, 1978 (age 47)
- Genres: Classical
- Instrument: Piano

Emmanuelle Swiercz (born 1 December 1978) is a French classical pianist.

== Biography ==
After her piano prize at the Conservatoire de Paris, Swiercz entered the advanced cycle in the classes of Michel Béroff, Denis Pascal and Marie-Françoise Bucquet. She also benefited from the advice of Jorge Chaminé, György Sebők, György Kurtág, Dmitri Bashkirov, Leon Fleisher and Murray Perahia.

She has performed at numerous festivals: Festival de La Roque-d'Anthéron, Festival Chopin de Bagatelle, Flâneries musicales de Reims, "Les Nouveaux Solistes" at the Jardin des Serres d'Auteuil, Salon-de-Provence International Music Festival, Nohant Festival... She also gives concerts abroad, notably at the Concertgebouw of Amsterdam, the International Piano Forum in Berlin, the Rudolfinum in Prague, the Athenaeum in Bucharest, the Théâtre Les Salons in Geneva and the Théâtre national des Beaux-Arts in Rio de Janeiro.

=== Training ===
Swiercz, who only started playing the piano at the age of 9, was passionate and determined and gave her first concert only two years later.

From the age of 16, she was unanimously admitted by the jury second nominated to the Conservatoire de Paris.

Invited by several venues in France (Salle Pleyel, Salle Gaveau, Cité de la Musique, auditoriums of the Musée d’Orsay, the Invalides and Senate in Paris, the Arsenal de Metz); she also performs throughout Europe.

=== Partners ===
As soloist, Emmanuelle Swiercz plays with the orchestras of Nagoya (Japan), Kazan and Novossibirsk (Russia), Viareggio (Italy), Kharkov (Ukraine), as well as with the Orchestra of the Conservatoire de Paris and the Orchestre de Douai-Région Nord-Pas de Calais.

Among her chamber music partners are musicians such as Henri Demarquette, Vladimír Bukač, Éric Le Sage, Suzanne Ramon, Graf Mourja as well as the Talich Quartet, the Psophos Quartet, and the Moraguès Quintet.

She participates in the promotion of French Romantic music with the support of the Bru-Zane Foundation.

== Selected discography ==
- 2007: Sergueï Rachmaninov - works for piano - Intrada
- 2008: Robert Schumann - works for piano - Intrada
- 2011: Franz Liszt - œuvres pour piano - Intrada
- 2013: Théodore Gouvy - Ediciones Singulares.
- 2015: Frédéric Chopin - Intégrale des Nocturnes - La Musica.
