= Bismuth (disambiguation) =

Bismuth is a chemical element with symbol Bi and atomic number 83.

Bismuth may also refer to:

== Entertainment ==
- "Bismuth" (Steven Universe), an episode of Steven Universe
- Bismuth, a character in Steven Universe (see List of Steven Universe characters)

== People ==
Bismuth is also a French-language surname. People with the name include:

- Boaz Bismuth (born 1964), Israeli journalist and ambassador
- David Bismuth (born 1975), French classical pianist
- Henri Bismuth (born 1934), French surgeon
- Isaac Bismuth (1889–1916), French sergeant
- Joseph Bismuth (1926–2019), Tunisian businessman and senator
- Julien Bismuth (born 1973), French artist
- Nadine Bismuth (born 1975), Canadian short story writer and writer
- Patrick Bismuth (born 1954), French classical violinist and conductor
- Pierre Bismuth (born 1963), French artist and filmmaker
- Sarah Bismuth (born 1996), French singer
- Jacqueline Genot-Bismuth (born 1938), French-Tunisian historian

== See also ==
- Bi (disambiguation)
- Maurice Bismouth (1891–1965), French-Tunisian painter
