= Claire Désert =

French pianist (born 1967)

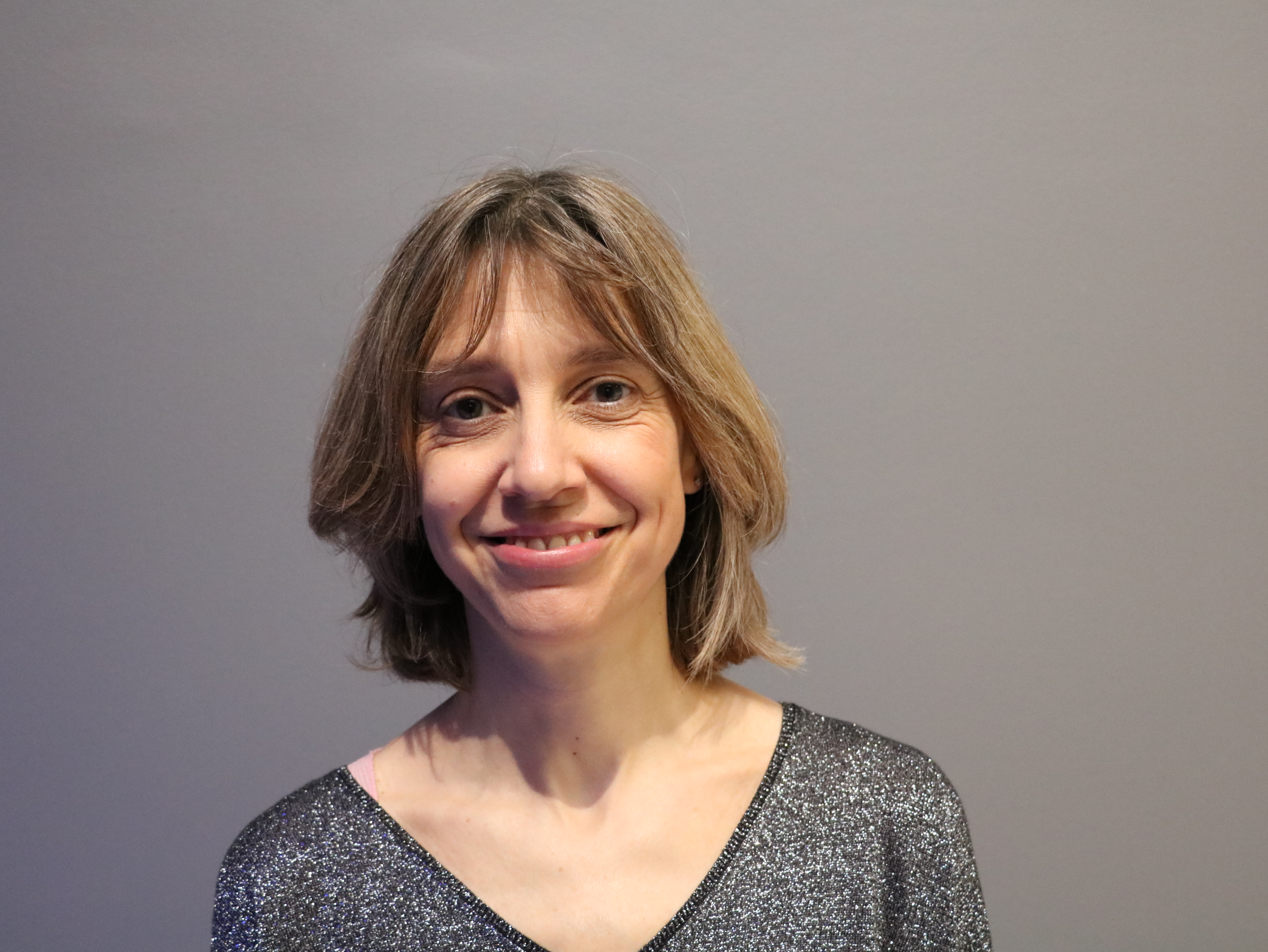
Claire Désert, La Folle Journée 2017

Claire Désert (born 1967) is a French classical pianist.

== Biography ==
Born in Angoulême, Désert began learning the piano at the age of five. At fourteen, she joined the Conservatoire de Paris (CNSMDP), where she was awarded the premier prix in piano by unanimous decision of the jury in the class of Vensislav Yankoff. A student of French composer Jean Hubeau, she also won the First prize for chamber music.

In 1985, she was unanimously awarded the first piano prize by the jury. She then enrolled in the class of the Bulgarian pianist Ventsislav Yankov. In the same year, she was admitted into the piano improvement cycle. She obtained a scholarship from the French government and went to study for one year at the Tchaïkovski Conservatory of Moscow, in the class of Yevgeny Malinin. Back in France, she joined the class of cellist Roland Pidoux and further perfected her chamber music skills.

== Career ==
Since the early 1990s, the musician has performed on stages such as the Wigmore Hall, the Kennedy Center and the Salle Pleyel as well as in international festivals at the invitation of La Folle Journée, the Piano aux Jacobins, the Lille Piano(s) Festival, the Flâneries musicales de Reims, the Festival international de musique de Colmar, the Stavelot Festival and the George Enescu Festival in Bucarest.

In 1997, she was named "New Talent of the Year" at the Victoires de la musique classique for her performance of the Czech composer Antonín Dvořák's and the Russian pianist and composer Alexander Scriabin's concertos, with the Orchestre Philharmonique de Strasbourg.

Désert is also a professor of piano at the Conservatoire de Paris

== Collaborations ==
As a soloist, she regularly accompanies renowned symphonic formations such as the Orchestre philharmonique de Radio France, the Orchestre philharmonique de Strasbourg, the Orchestre philharmonique de Paris, the Orchestre national de Lille, the Orchestre symphonique de Québec and the Orchestre national d'Île-de-France. Her musical career has led her to play and record alongside the musicians of the Sine Nomine Quartet, cellists Anne Gastinel, Gary Hoffman, violinists Tedi Papavrami, Philippe Graffin and Nemanja Radulović and pianist Emmanuel Strosser.

== Discography ==
=== Personal albums ===
- 2007: Robert Schumann's Davidbünderltänze Op 6, Mirare
- 2010: Robert Schumann's Abendmusik, Mirare

=== Collaborations ===
- 1999: Œuvres pour piano à quatre mains : Variations (8) / Op.35 - Allegro / op.144 'Lebensstürme'... by Franz Schubert with Claire Désert and Emmanuel Strosser, Aria Music
- 2000: Musique de chambre by Elliott Carter with Patrick Gallois, Michel Lethiec, Arto Noras, Gérard Poulet and Amaury Wallez, Arion
- 2000: Saint-Saëns's The Carnival of the Animals with Francis Blanche, Vincent Coq, Claire Désert, Philippe Meyer, Raphaël Pidoux and Léa Weber.
- 2001: Quintette pour piano et vents - Ma mère l'Oye by Maurice Ravel and André Caplet, Claire Désert and the Moragues wind quintet, Le Chant du Monde
- 2001: Cello Concerto in A minor by Robert Schumann with Anne Gastinel and Louis Langrée (conductor), Valois
- 2002: Les Œuvres pour flûte by Albert Roussel with Mathieu Dufour, Adrienne Krausz, Michel Moraguez, Julie Palloc, Sandrine Piau and the Moraguès Wind Quartet, Saphir
- 2004: Duos pour piano by Johannes Brahms and Franz Schubert with Emmanuel Strosser, Virgin Classics
- 2005: Arpeggione by Franz Schubert, with Anne Gastinel, Naïve
- 2005: Piano Quartets, compositions by Alexis de Castillon, Camille Saint-Saëns, Ernest Chausson and Guillaume Lekeu with the Kandinsky quartet, Virgin Classics
- 2005: In the shade of forests, compositions by George Enescu, Maurice Ravel and Claude Debussy with Claire Désert and Philippe Graffin, Avie
- 2005: Mendelssohn Bartholdy's Songs Without Words with Claire Désert and David Walter, Polymnie
- 2007: Danses slaves, Op 46 and Op 72 by Antonín Dvořák with Claire Désert and Emmanuel Strosser, Mirare
- 2007: Mozart's 3 préludes pfor piano - 3 strophes sur le nom de Sacher - Dutilleux's Ainsi la nuit with Claire Désert, Desmons, Hery, Perraud, Erol
- 2008: Arpeggione by Franz Schubert, Claire Désert, Anne Gastinel, Édition collector naïve 10 ans
- 2013: L'enfance - Piano à 4 mains with Claire Désert and Emmanuel Strosser, Mirare
- 2013: Moments musicaux - Pieces for Paul Klee - Suonare - All ungarese by Bruno Mantovani with Claire Désert and the Trio Wanderer, Mirare
- 2015: Œuvres pour piano à 4 mains by Franz Schubert, Claire Désert, Emmanuel Strosser, Mirare
- 2017: Brahms: Cello Sonatas with Claire Désert and Gary Hoffman, La Dolce Vota

=== Compilations ===
- 2006: Anne Gastinel - Coffret 3Cds, compositions by Johannes Brahms, Robert Schumann and Franz Schubert with Claire Désert, Anne Gastinel, François-Frédéric Guy, Louis Langrée (conductor) and the Orchestre Philharmonique de Liège, Naïve
- 2007: Classique et Zen, Classical compilation with Rinaldo Alessandrini, Lise de la Salle, Claire Désert, Anne Gastinel, Howard Griffiths, François-Frédéric Guy, Laurence Equilbey, Sara Mingardo, Fazıl Say, Grigory Sokolov, Naïve
- 2010: Complete chamber music with winds by Francis Poulenc, Compilation Classique with Berrod, Claire Désert, Emmanuel Strosser, Trenel and the Orchestre des solistes de Paris, Indesens

== Live recordings ==
- 2005: Stabat Mater by Bruno Coulais, live recording with Loïc Pierre (conductor), le Choeur de Chambre Mikrokosmos, Guillaume Depardieu, Claire Désert, Marie Kobayashi, Laurent Korcia, Aïcha Redouane, Slim Pezin, Robert Wyatt, Naïve
- 2006: Recordings of the piano Festival de La Roque-d'Anthéron with Nicholas Angelich, Iddo Bar-Shaï, Boris Berezovsky, Claire Désert, Brigitte Engerer, Philippe Giusiano, Jean-Frédéric Neuburger, Anne Queffélec, Emmanuel Strosser, Édition limitée, Mirare
- 2007: Recordings of the La Roque-d'Anthéron piano festival, volume 2, with Nicholas Angelich, Iddo Bar-Shaï, Boris Berezovsky, Claire Désert, Shani Diluka, Philippe Giusiano, Anne Queffélec, Jean-Frederic Neuburger, Emmanuel Strosser, Mirare
