= Pablo Márquez =

Pablo Márquez or Pablo Marquez may refer to:

- Pablo Márquez (guitarist), Argentinean guitarist
- Pablo Márquez (wrestler), Ecuadorian wrestler
