= Julian Trevelyan (pianist) =

British pianist (born 1998)

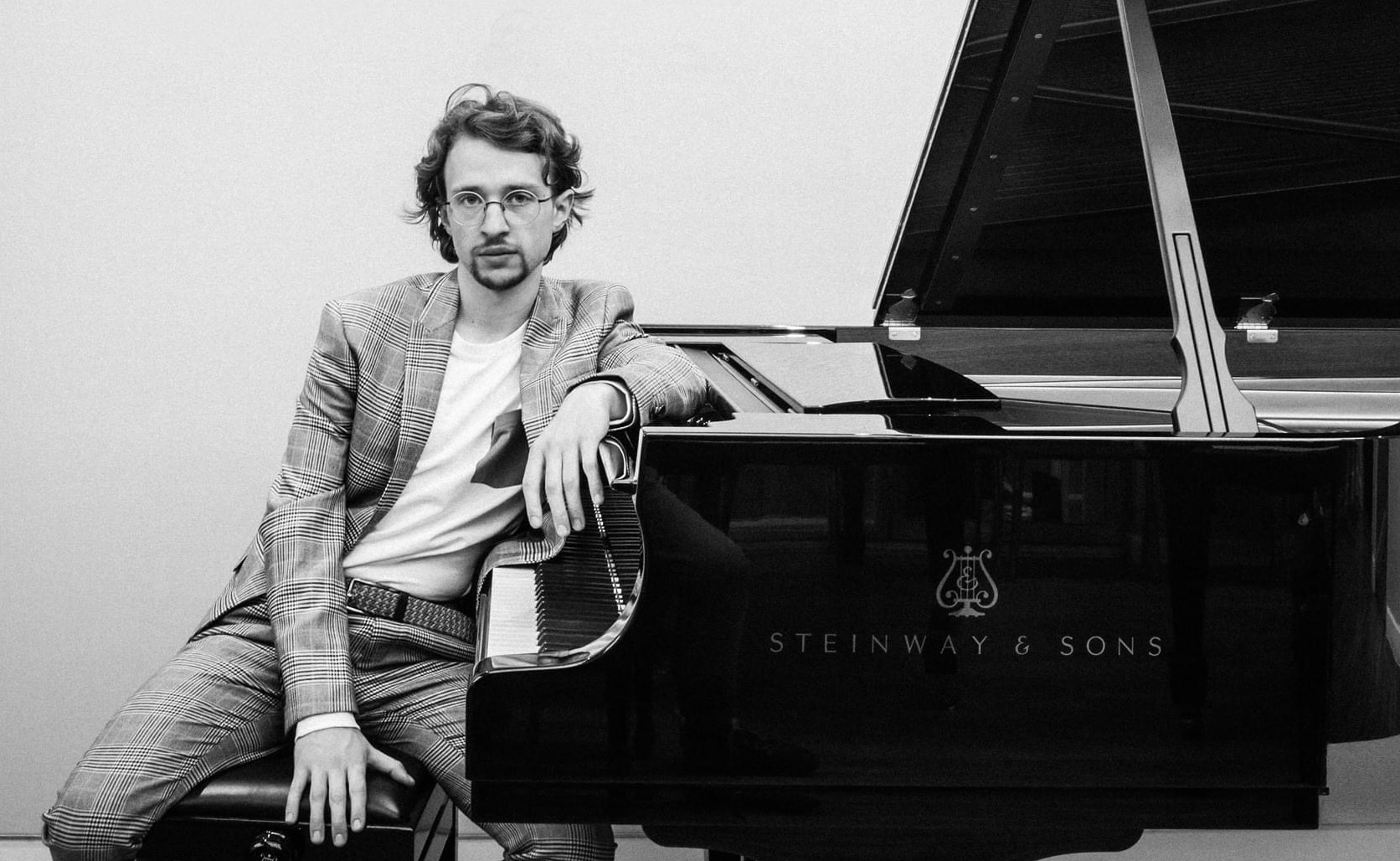
Julian Trevelyan in 2022

Julian Miles Trevelyan (born 1998) is a British pianist and musicologist who won international competitions, such as the Long-Thibaud-Crespin Competition in Paris in 2015 at age 16.

== Life and career ==
=== Education ===
He is son and heir apparent of Sir Peter John Trevelyan, 6th baronet. Trevelyan has been home-schooled. His music teachers included Elizabeth Altman, Christopher Elton, Patrick Hemmerlé and Rita Wagner for piano and Catherine Manson for violin. He studied at the École Normale de Musique de Paris with Rena Shereshevskaya supported by a scholarship from the Or du Rhin Foundation and Patrick Masure, where he was awarded the Diplôme Supérieure de Composition in 2018 and the Diplôme Supérieure de Concertiste (Piano) in 2019. He also studied for a musicology degree at the University of Oxford. Julian Trevelyan has studied in masterclasses by Stephen Kovacevich and Menahem Pressler, Paul Badura-Skoda and Jean-Marc Luisada at the Musikverein in 2019, Maria João Pires, in 2017, Peter Feuchtwanger, 2015 and Margaret Fingerhut, 2014.

=== Concerts ===
Trevelyan has travelled widely to give solo and orchestral concerts. These include Beethoven's Piano Sonatas and Diabelli Variations, Ullman’s 7th Sonata and Shostakovich's piano sonatas. He has performed piano concertos by Brahms, Howard Blake, Bartók, Lutosławski, Prokofiev, Shostakovich, Tchaikovsky and Mozart.

=== Competitions ===
Trevelyan has won several major classical music competitions, often being the youngest to compete.

Trevelyan was a finalist in the keyboard section of the 2014 BBC Young Musician of the Year competition.

In April 2015, Trevelyan took the Grand Prize in the "Concours Festival pour le Répertoire Pianistique Moderne" (Competitive Festival for the Contemporary Piano Repertoire, or C.F.R.P.M.) in Paris, including the prize for the best interpretation of a work by Maurice Ravel.

In May 2015, he took second place and the Mocsari Prize (given by Károly Mocsári) in the Ile de France International Piano Competition in Maisons-Laffitte.

Concours Long-Thibaud Crespin

On 27 October 2015, at age 16, Trevelyan became the youngest prize-winner in the piano category of the Concours International Long-Thibaud-Crespin in Paris. He won the second Grand Prize, the first prize not being awarded that year, as well as the Prize awarded by Prince Albert II of Monaco for the best interpretation of a concerto; the Long Piano prize is one of the four major international piano competitions.

In November 2015, he was the winner of the Young Pianist of the North, competition, held in Newcastle upon Tyne, England.

In 2016, Trevelyan continued his foray into international piano competition by coming second in the "Kissinger Klavierolymp" (Bad Kissingen Piano Olympics) for young pianists, as part of the Kissinger Sommer, and was again a finalist in the BBC Young Musician competition.

In 2017, Trevelyan participated in the Arthur Rubinstein International Piano Master Competition, in which he reached Stage II, the highest placing for a British pianist. Later in the year, he won the "Luitpold Prize" of the Kissinger Sommer festival. In October, he won second prize and the audience vote in the Dudley International Piano Competition.

Trevelyan continued to compete internationally in 2018, participating in the André Dumortier International Competition, where he was again the only British contestant. He won second prize.

Geza Anda and Horowitz competitions

In 2021, he returned to major competition at the Concours Géza Anda, where he was the youngest competitor. Over three rounds and the final, he played Debussy, a Chopin study and sonata, a Bach partita, Brahms and Frank Martin, and piano concertos by Mozart and Bartók. He won the 2nd Grand Prize for his performance overall in the competition, as well as the Mozart Prize awarded by the Musikkollegium Winterthur for the semi-final Mozart concerto (N° 9), and the Géza Anda Audience Prize voted by the public for his interpretation of Bela Bartók's 3rd Piano Concerto.

In May 2023, he won the Second Prize at the major International Competition for Young Pianists in Memory of Vladimir Horowitz. The competition took place in Geneva, Switzerland due to the Russian invasion of Ukraine.

Recordings & releases

In 2022, Julian Trevelyan released a CD recording of Mozart Concertos 23 KV488 and 24 KV491 with acclaimed classical musician Christian Zacharias and the ORF RADIO-SYMPHONIEORCHESTER WIEN with Alpha Label, which was very well received.
