= Brigitte Bouthinon-Dumas =

French pianist and music educator

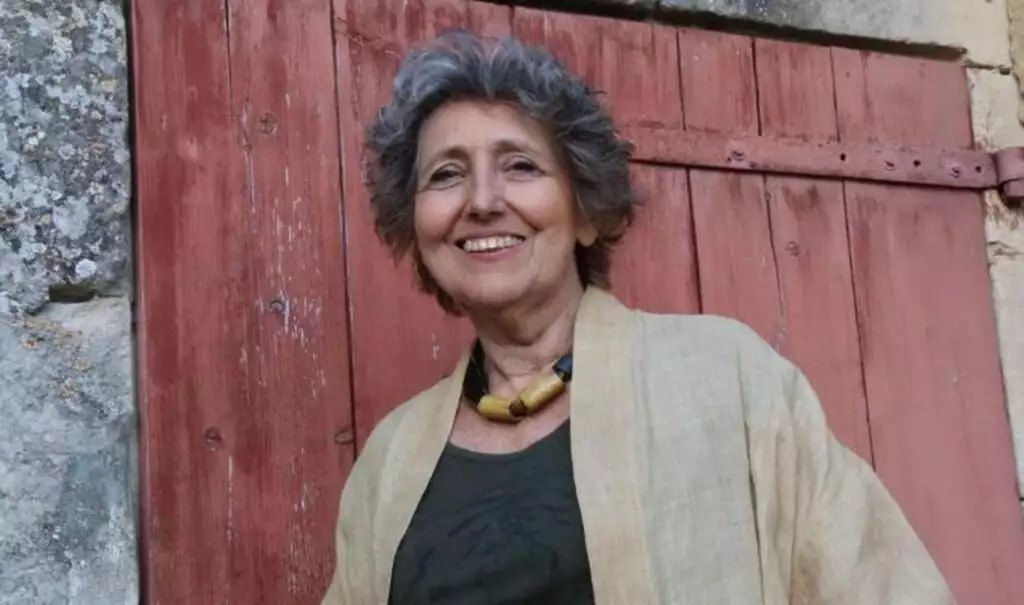
Brigitte Bouthinon-Dumas

Brigitte Bouthinon-Dumas (born in 1947) is a French pianist and music educator, the author of numerous educational reference works including Mémoire d'Empreintes.

== Biography ==
Bouthinon-Dumas began her career as a child prodigy, starting at the age of 3 with her first scales. She was solicited for solo concerts at the age of 5, then at 9 with orchestra. Noticed by the illustrious French pianist Yvonne Lefébure, she entered the Conservatoire de Paris at 14, benefiting from her advice as well as those of Yvonne Loriod and Germaine Mounier.

Since then, she has taught piano at several French institutions, as a teacher holding the Certificat d'Aptitude, notably at the Conservatoire à rayonnement départemental d'Angoulême, where French pianist Claire Désert says she remembers "a natural, sensitive and generous musical education and instrumental approach", then at the conservatoire à rayonnement régional de Paris where she worked as a teacher until her retirement in 2012. The young French pianist Romain Descharmes was appointed to succeed her.

== Career ==
Many summer academies and masterclasses invite Bouthinon-Dumas to provide courses to motivated young learners: in France, at the Nancy Academies, at the International György Sebők Academy in Barèges, but also throughout Europe and the world: Poland, Belarus (Minsk) on the occasion of the release of the Russian translation of Mémoire d'empreintes, China (Shanghai, Conservatoire)...

The French embassies underline the importance of her interventions as in Minsk or Brasilia where Bouthinon-Dumas was invited for a post-graduate training of piano teachers of the Conservatory of Brasilia.

The conservatories regularly call on Bouthinon-Dumas as a teacher for tutoring students in pedagogy, as well as the juries for obtaining the Certificate of Aptitude. The CNSM of Paris and Lyon also invite the pedagogue and pianist to express her opinion as a member of the jury of competitions and exams, and finally the recruitment of new piano teachers also makes use of her presence.

Bouthinon-Dumas gives lecture-concerts, articulated around the presentation of the musical and technical difficulties of a great work of the classical repertoire, at the end of which she plays the work she has just described to the public. This original way of transmitting her vision of musical learning was performed in Nancy, and Barèges.

== Pedagogy ==
Bouthinon-Dumas' educational works were published in the 1990s and 2000s. They are designed in order to help her students avoid suffering the shortcomings of a certain more academic, less natural way of teaching music.

== Mémoire d'empreintes ==
Bouthinon-Dumas summarizes part of her vision of pedagogy in an essay titled Mémoire d'empreintes, which can reincarnate in the 21st century what interpretative treatises dear to the virtuosos and pedagogues of the 18th and 19th centuries represented (notably François Couperin's L'art de toucher le clavecin and Carl Philipp Emanuel Bach's Essai sur la manière véridique de jouer d'un instrument à clavier). The back cover sets out the main lines of thought:

"Why this book? Because few instrumentalists understand why the piano so often betrays their thinking. All the elements - stability and fingerprint, true relaxation, tactile and cerebral awareness - give the means for a real and not only intentional sound requirement."

== Students ==
Some students trained by Bouthinon-Dumas before entering regional conservatories and pursuing a career:

- Claire Désert (now professor at the CNSMD de Paris and concertist).
- Amaury Breyne (CNSMD of Lyon)
- Cassandre Ramos (École Royale de Bruxelles)
- Naïri Badal & Adélaïde Panaget (CNSMD de Paris, Duo Jatekok).
- Katherine Nikitine (CNSMD of Lyon)
- Frédéric Raibaud (CNSMD of Paris in accompaniment, second prize in the International Piano Competition XXe Montsalvatge)
- Bianca Chillemi (CNSMD de Paris).

== Bibliography ==
- Mémoire d'empreintes - l'enseignement du piano, Points de vue, Cité de la musique, Paris, 1993, 1999 ISBN 2-906460-86-9 - book
- Ludwig van Beethoven: 32 Variations, édition de travail, Gérard Billaudot Éditeur, Paris - Score
- Piano-Juniors: apprendre et jouer, Gérard Billaudot, Paris - Score + CD
- Next to Piano-Juniors, Gérard Billaudot, Paris, 2003 - Score + CD
- Piano-Adultes: volume 1, apprendre ou recommencer le piano, Gérard Billaudot, Paris, 2004 - Score + CD
- Piano-Adultes: volume 2, pour continuer, Gérard Billaudot, Paris, 2004 - Score + CD

Direction of the Brigitte Bouthinon-Dumas Series published by Gérard Billaudot, in which many works of didactic contemporary music are published, notably those of Nicolas Bacri, Karol Beffa, Thierry Escaich...

- Clavier d'Avenir, Gérard Billaudot Éditeur, Paris, 2009.
