= Xénia Maliarevitch =

French classical pianist

Xénia Maliarevitch (born in 1980) is a contemporary French classical pianist.

== Biography ==
After starting piano lessons in Saint Petersburg, her family moved to Nancy. In 1987 she entered the Nancy Conservatory. She was unanimously awarded the Gold Medal for piano in 1993, then the Gold Medal for chamber music in 1995. In 1996, she joined the Conservatoire de Paris where she worked with Gérard Frémy. She obtained her higher education diploma in 2000, and then began a further training of chamber music with Christian Ivaldi and Ami Flammer in Paris, then in Prague with Maurice Bourgue. She won 2nd prizes at the international chamber music competitions of Pinerolo and Katherinholm in 2003, and at the Pierre Lantier competition in Paris.

She gives numerous concerts, notably in France; has played in duet with the violinist Carole Petitdemange and currently plays with cellist Clara Zaoui with whom she forms the Duo Humoresque.
