= André Gedalge =

French composer and teacher (1856–1926)

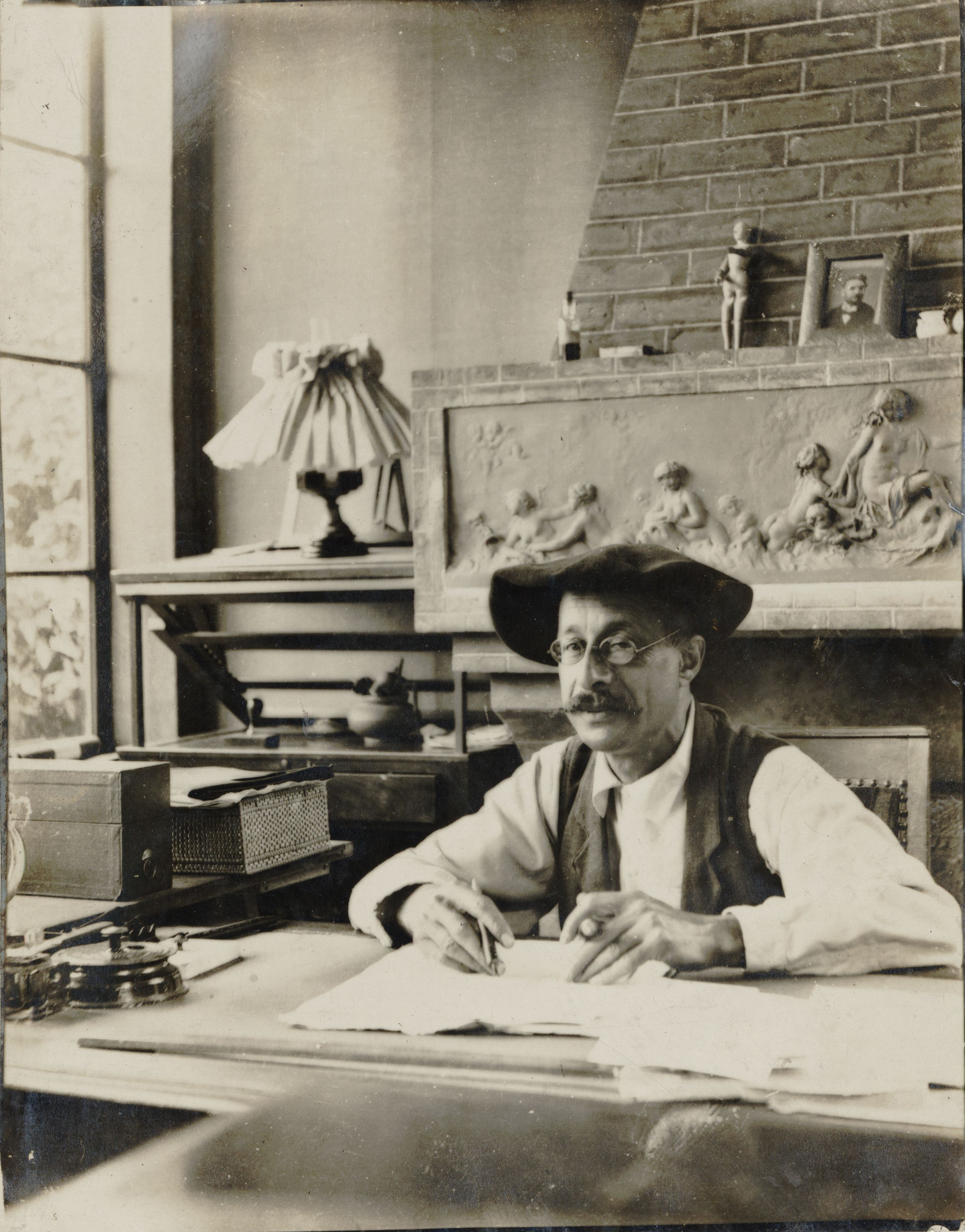
André Gedalge at his home in Chessy, about 1908, Bibliothèque nationale de France.

André Gedalge (27 December 1856 – 5 February 1926) was a French composer and teacher.

== Biography ==
André Gedalge was born at 75 rue des Saints-Pères in Paris where he first worked as a bookseller and editor, specialising in livres de prix for public schools. During this time his father and him published books by Marie Laubot and Edmond About for the Librairie Gedalge.

In 1886, at the age of 28, he entered the Conservatoire de Paris. In that same year he won the Second Prix de Rome. He studied under Ernest Guiraud, professor of counterpoint and fugue, who had also been Jules Massenet's teacher.

In 1891, Gedalge composed the score for Le Petit Savoyard, a pantomime in four acts performed at the Théâtre des Nouveautés. In 1895, Pris au Piège was awarded the Prix Cressant. In June 1900, his one act ballet Phoebé debuted at the Opéra-Comique. He composed Quatuor d'archet, Les Vaux de Vire (a collection of mélodies), children's songs, and three symphonies. These illustrated the proud motto that he followed: "Neither literature, nor painting", which defined "pure music". His Third Symphony in F Major and his Concerto for Piano and Orchestra (written in 1899) were considered masterpieces of French music.

In the years before World War I, Gedalge served as mayor of Chessy, Seine-et-Marne, where he later died and was buried.

== Teaching ==
He influenced many students of music. Both Maurice Ravel and George Enescu, who studied under Gedalge, dedicated compositions to him, Ravel dedicating his piano trio and Enescu his octet for strings. Other pupils that dedicated works include Charles Koechlin, who dedicated his 7 Rondels, Op.8, and Eugène Cools, who dedicated his Violin Sonata, Op.79. Composer and ethnomusicologist Angèle Ravizé also studied with Gedalge.

He also wrote instructional works for students: Traité de la fugue ("Treatise of the Fugue", 1904) and L'Enseignement de la Musique par l'éducation de l'oreille ("The Instruction of Music by the Education of the Ear", 1922). He was relatively modest and, as such, did not garner a large reputation as an individual musician, but he greatly benefited from the wide recognition of his students. On the day after his death, it was written:

He gave to his students the best part of himself: the knowledge, the understanding of man and the supreme gift that is goodness. It was sufficient that he had been poor and worthy of the name of musician for that he counselled, taught, and gave affectionate welcome not only to his class, but in the intimacy of his dwelling.

(See below for original quote.)

(Il donnait à ses élèves le meilleur de lui-même: le savoir, la connaissance des hommes et ce don suprême qu'est la bonté. Il suffisait qu'un être fût pauvre et digne du nom de musicien pour qu'il trouvât conseils, leçons et affectueux accueil non seulement à sa classe, mais dans l'intimité de son logis.)

== Selected works ==
=== Operas ===
- Volapük-Revue (1886), Play, libretto by William Busnach and Albert Vanloo
- Pris au piège (1890), Opéra comique
- Le Petit Savoyard (1891), Pantomime
- Le Rabbin (1891), Opéra comique
- Hélène (1893), Drama
- La Farce du cadi (1897)
- Sita, Légende dramatique
- Yvette, Pantomime

=== Ballets ===
- Phoebé (1900)

=== Orchestral works ===
- Symphony No. 1 in D major (1893)
- Concerto for Piano and Orchestra in C minor, Op. 16 (1899)
- Symphony No. 2 in C minor (1902 reorchestrated 1912)
- Symphony No. 3 in F major (1910)
- Violin Concerto in A minor (date unknown)
- Symphony No. 4 in A major (unfinished)

=== Chamber works ===
- Menuet for String Trio (1873)
- Romance sans paroles for violin and piano (1880)
- String Quartet in B major (1892)
- Sonata No 1 in G major for violin and piano, Op. 12 (1897)
- Sonata No 2 in A minor for violin and piano, Op. 19 (1900)

=== Piano ===
- Séguedille (1884)
- 3 Valses (1888)
- Quatre Préludes et fugues, Op. 11 (1896)
- 4 Pièces pour piano à 4 mains, Op. 18 (1901)
- 3 Etudes de concert, Op. 23 (1902)

Also works for piano, piano and voice, a requiem and other choral works.

== Writings ==
- Traité de la fugue (1901)
- l'Enseignement de la Musique par l'éducation de l'oreille (1922)

== Discography ==
- Pièces instrumentales et mélodies Geneviève Laurenceau, violin; Mario Hacquard, baritone; Lorène de Ratuld and Claude Collet, piano; Benny Sluchin, trombone; Antoine Curé, trumpet (CD, Polymnie, 2007)
