= Festival de La Roque-d'Anthéron =

Piano festival

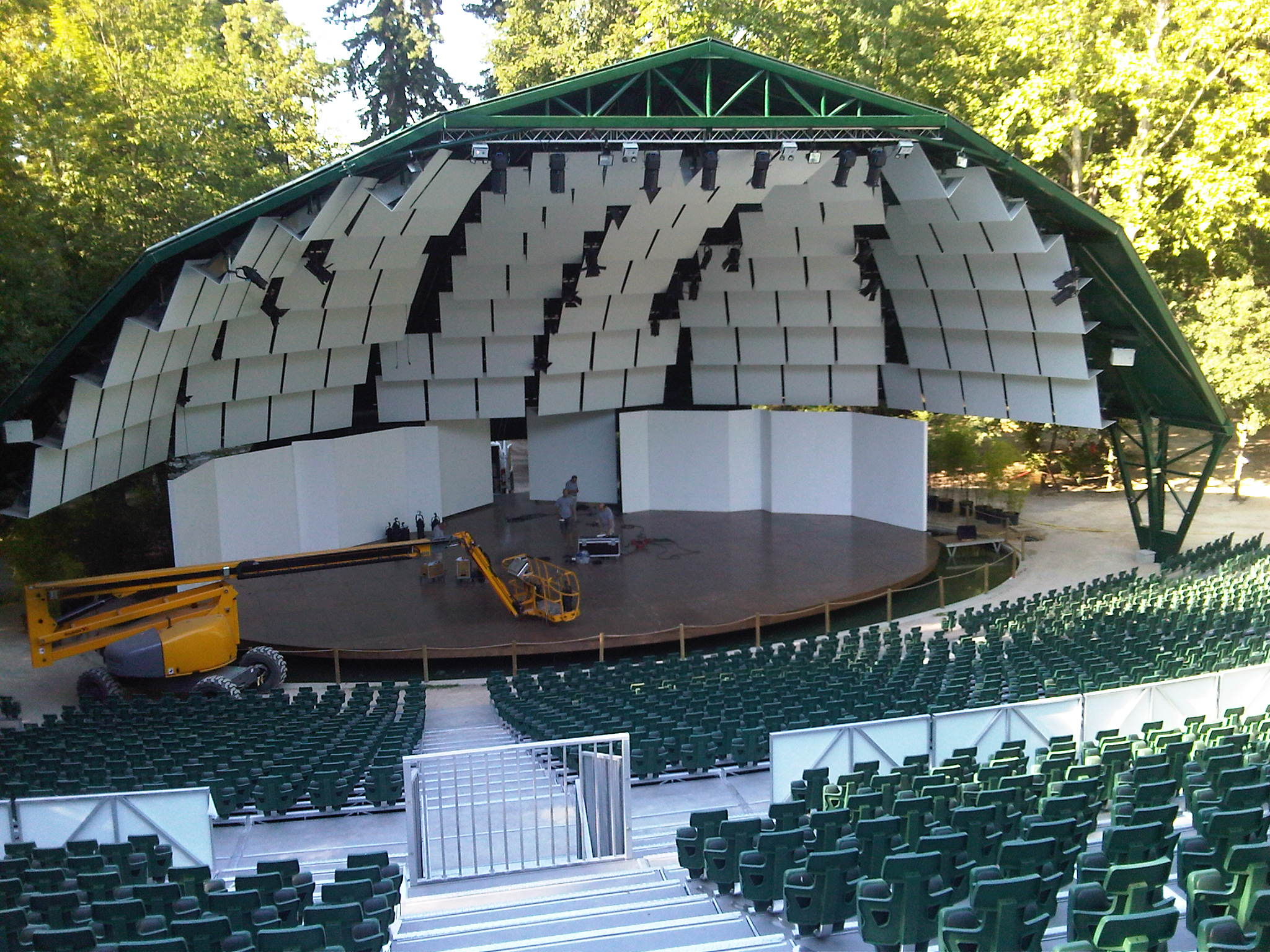
Stage of the parc of the Château de Florans

The Festival de La Roque-d'Anthéron is an international piano festival, founded on 10 August 1981 by Paul Onoratini (1920–2010)—then mayor of La Roque-d'Anthéron—and René Martin, then an intern at the Regional Directorate of Cultural Affairs.

Held every summer in the open air in the park of the Château de Florans, it is recognised as one of Europe's major musical events. Some newspapers call it the "Mecca of the piano".

== Interprets ==
The festival is a meeting place for pianists, bringing together emerging talent and musicians with established reputations.

Invited artists include Martha Argerich, Nelson Freire, Boris Berezovsky, Youri Egorov, Evgeny Kissin, Zhu Xiao-Mei, François-Frédéric Guy, Claire Désert, Nikolai Lugansky, Eliso Virsaladze, Valentina Igoshina, Brigitte Engerer, Arcadi Volodos, Anne Queffélec, Alexandre Tharaud, Marie-Josèphe Jude, Hélène Grimaud, Mauricio Vallina, who regularly perform at this festival.

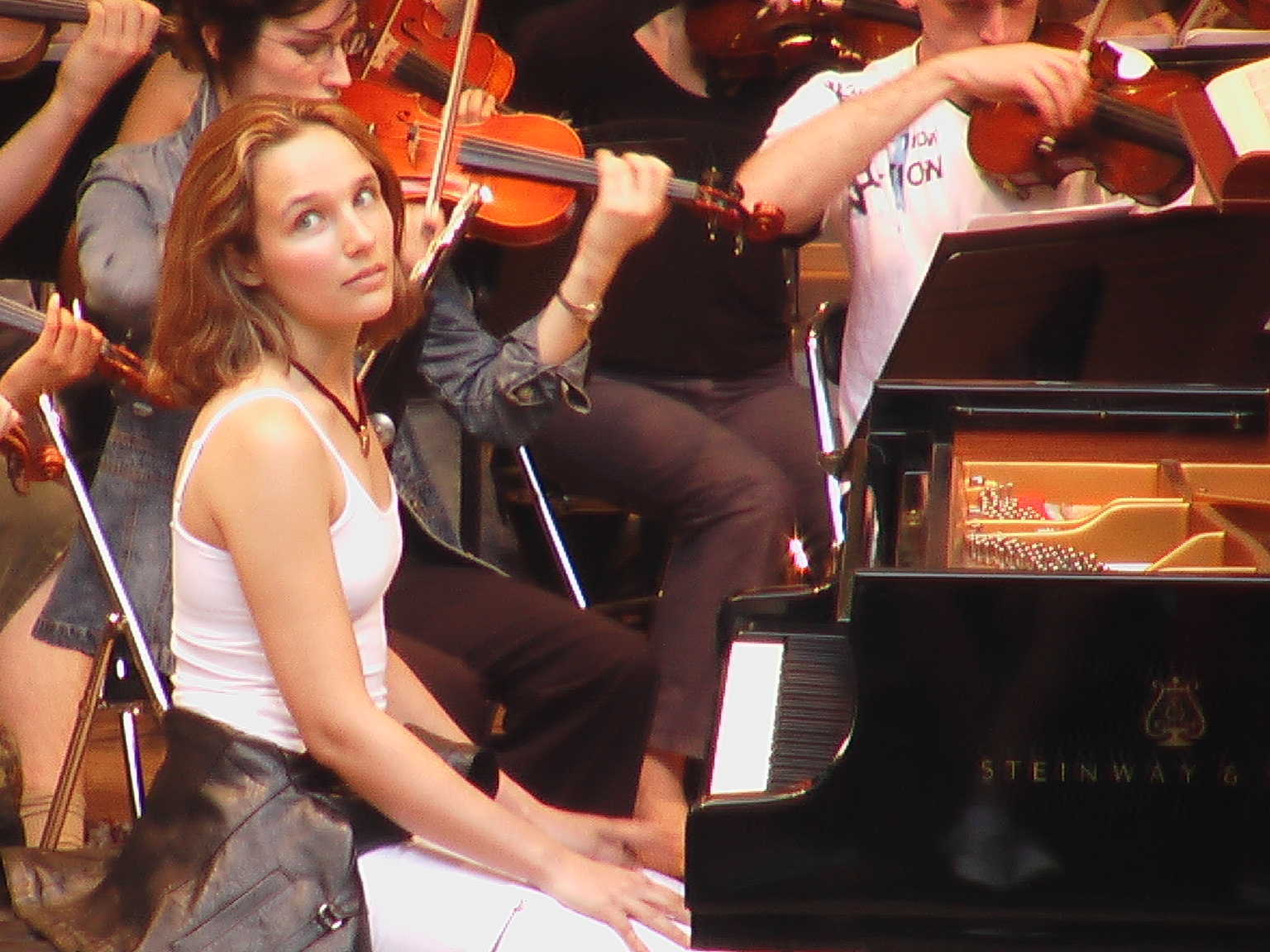
Hélène Grimaud rehearsing in 2004

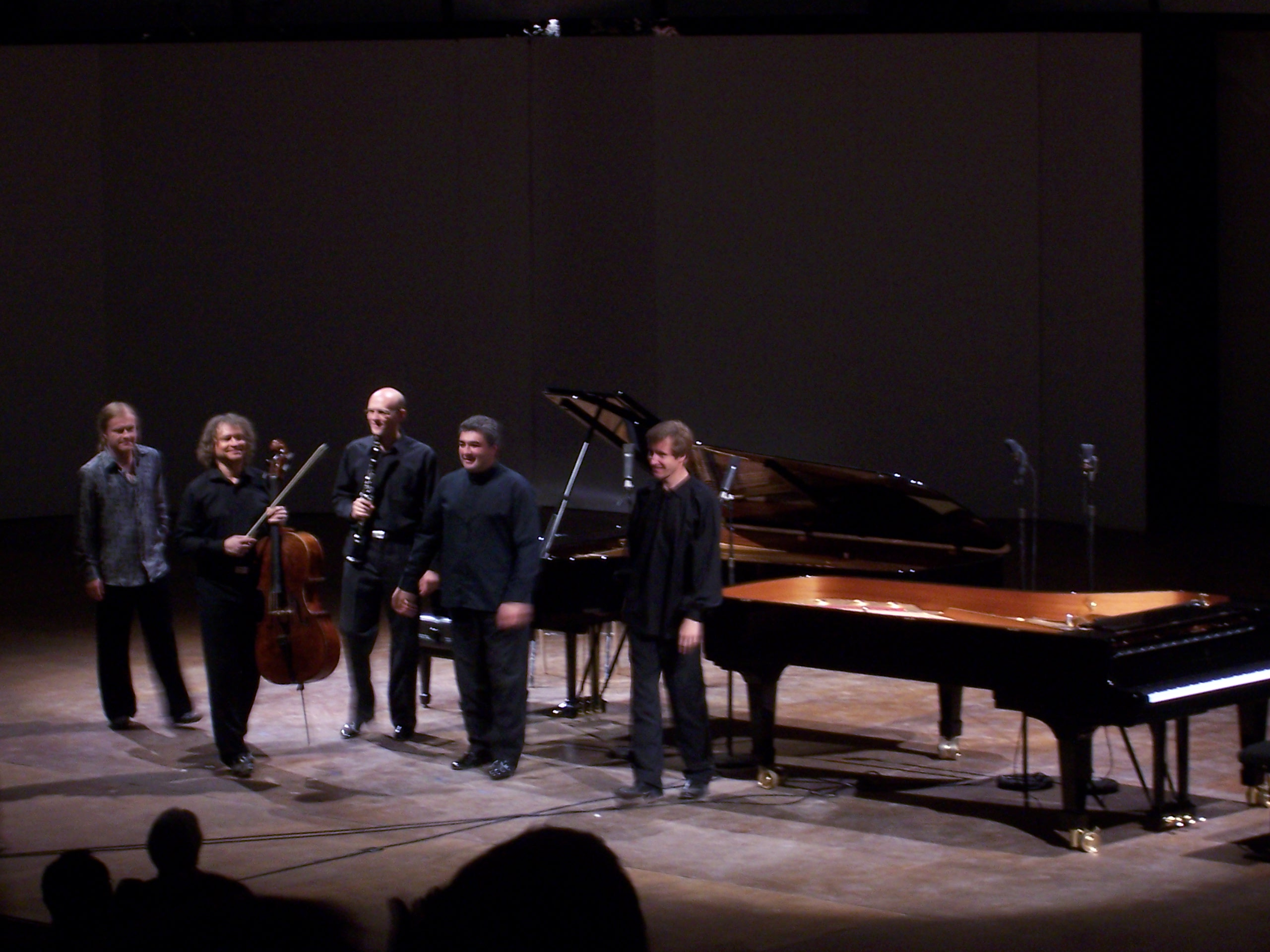
Carte blanche to Nikolai Lugansky in 2008

Although the festival is centered on the piano, other instrumentalists sometimes join the stage, in orchestra formations such as the Concerto Köln and the Orchestre de Chambre de Lausanne, or in chamber formation (Gautier and Renaud Capuçon, Trio Wanderer...), as well as various baroques ensembles, jazz and electronic music composers...

The piano is sometimes replaced by a harpsichord, an organ, a pianoforte, a clavicord, or a toy piano.

The "ensembles in residence" are small chamber music ensembles made up of young musicians who came to La Roque-d'Anthéron to study during the masterclasses of the great masters of the piano. They also perform in various surrounding villages, La route de la Durance aux Alpilles, during free concerts that showcase up-and-coming talent.

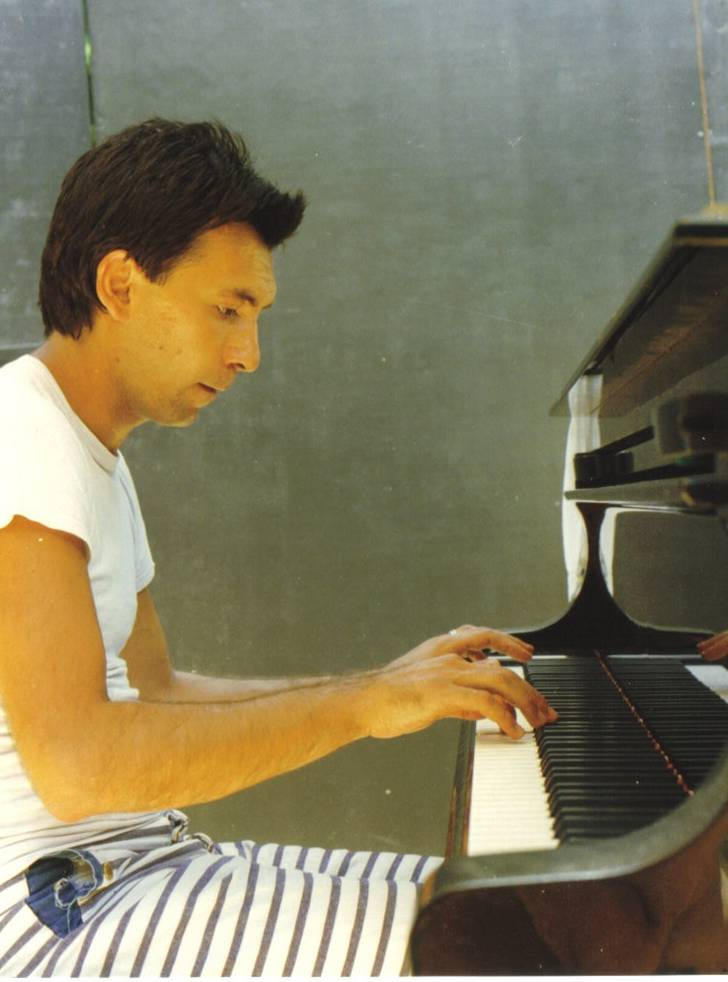
Youri Egorov rehearsing

Concerts take place at various locations on the site, not always in the village itself.

== Concert locations ==
- Parc du Château de Florans: Clairière converted into an outdoor auditorium, it is the key site of the festival.
- Théâtre Forbin: Another outdoor auditorium, located in parc Florans, is designed for a smaller audience and its concerts, only during the day, give way to the new generation of pianists.
- Silvacane Abbey: In the cloister of the nave of the abbey, are mainly held concerts of Baroque music.
- Temple protestant de Lourmarin
- Église de La Roque-d'Anthéron
- Étang des Aulnes: This site is located in Saint-Martin-de-Crau, 60 km from La Roque d'Anthéron. This is another open-air auditorium with a remarkable setting and acoustics
- Carrières (quarries) of Rognes: In this natural stone setting, 9 km from La Roque-d'Anthéron, concerts of jazz, 20th century piano music and electronic music are held.
- Théâtre des terrasses of Gordes
- Église Notre-Dame de Beaulieu of Cucuron, especially for the pipe organ of the church.
