= Mauricio Vallina =

Cuban pianist living in Brussels (born 1970)

Mauricio Vallina (born 1970 in Havana,) is a Cuban pianist living in Brussels. He has been a top prize-winner of national and international piano competitions. His prizes include Valencia (1994) and Gernika (1996) international piano competitions, and he has also been awarded special prizes for the best performance of Cuban and Spanish Music.

== Education and debut ==
After graduating in Havana, with a "Gold" Diploma (1988), Vallina achieved a solid formation at the Moscow "Tchaikovsky" Conservatory (Master of Fine Arts in 1996), the Madrid Royal Conservatory and the Como International Piano Foundation. His teachers included Roberto Urbay, Henrietta Mirvis, Irina Plotnikova, Joaquin Soriano, Alicia de Larrocha, Dimitri Bashkirov, Fou Ts'ong, Zenaida Manfugás and Martha Argerich. Vallina's debut performance was at the Zurich Tonhalle in 1998.

== Performances ==
Vallina performed at many international festivals, including the Festival de La Roque-d'Anthéron, the Schleswig-Holstein music festival, the Radio France-Montpellier festival, “Beppu, Argerich‘s meeting point“, Sintra festival, Lugano festival. Many of his concerts have been broadcast on radio or television.

He has performed with leading orchestras. In chamber music he has performed with Polina Leschenko, Gabriela Montero, Nelson Goerner, Karin Lechner, Alexander Mogilevsky, Martha Argerich, Evgeny Brahman, Don-Hyek Lim, Pia Sebastiani, Mirabela Dina, Geza Hosszu-Legocky, Mark Drobinsky, Renaud Capuçon and Gautier Capuçon. He has been featured in several documentary films such as “Evening Talks“, “Nelson Freire“- a Brazilian production. As a regular partner with Martha Argerich, he has performed in many countries; some of the performances were released, “Live from Lugano Festival“ 2005, 2007 and 2009 with EMI.

== Recordings ==
In 2001, Vallina recorded his first CD with EMI CLASSICS INTERNATIONAL. This EMI Abbey Road recording received a “CHOC“ in the magazine Le Monde de la musique and brought him great acclaim in Vienna, London and Paris.

Vallina was chosen “The Rurh Piano Festival Stipend of the year 2008“. As part of this promotional project, his solo recital was recorded and released within the phonographic magazine FonoForum, along with the premier of one of his own works: L'Enigma.

== Repertoire and compositions ==
Vallina performs a broad repertoire from Bach to contemporary works and new compositions, some of them dedicated to him. The new composition First concerto for Piano and Orchestra by the Colombian composer Arturo Cuellar, premiered at the Colón Theater of Buenos Aires in 2001. The Sonata en Mi bemol of the same composer, premièred at the Zürich Tonhalle in 2002. Vallina opened Martha Argerich Project Lugano Festival 2007, performing the Lutoslawsky Paganini Variations with the Orchestra della Svizzera Italiana. He performed Mac Dowell's second piano concerto with the Orchestre Philarmonique de Liège, at the opening concert of the Festival Amériques (2008).

During the Martha Argerich Project_Lugano Festival 2009 he performed with the legendary pianist a memorable version of Liszt_Don Juan. In 2010 he mainly focused on Chopin and Schumann. He is also Executive Professor at the first online musical academy of the world: The Lions-Club Mozart Academy of Vienna.
