= François-Frédéric Guy =

French classical pianist

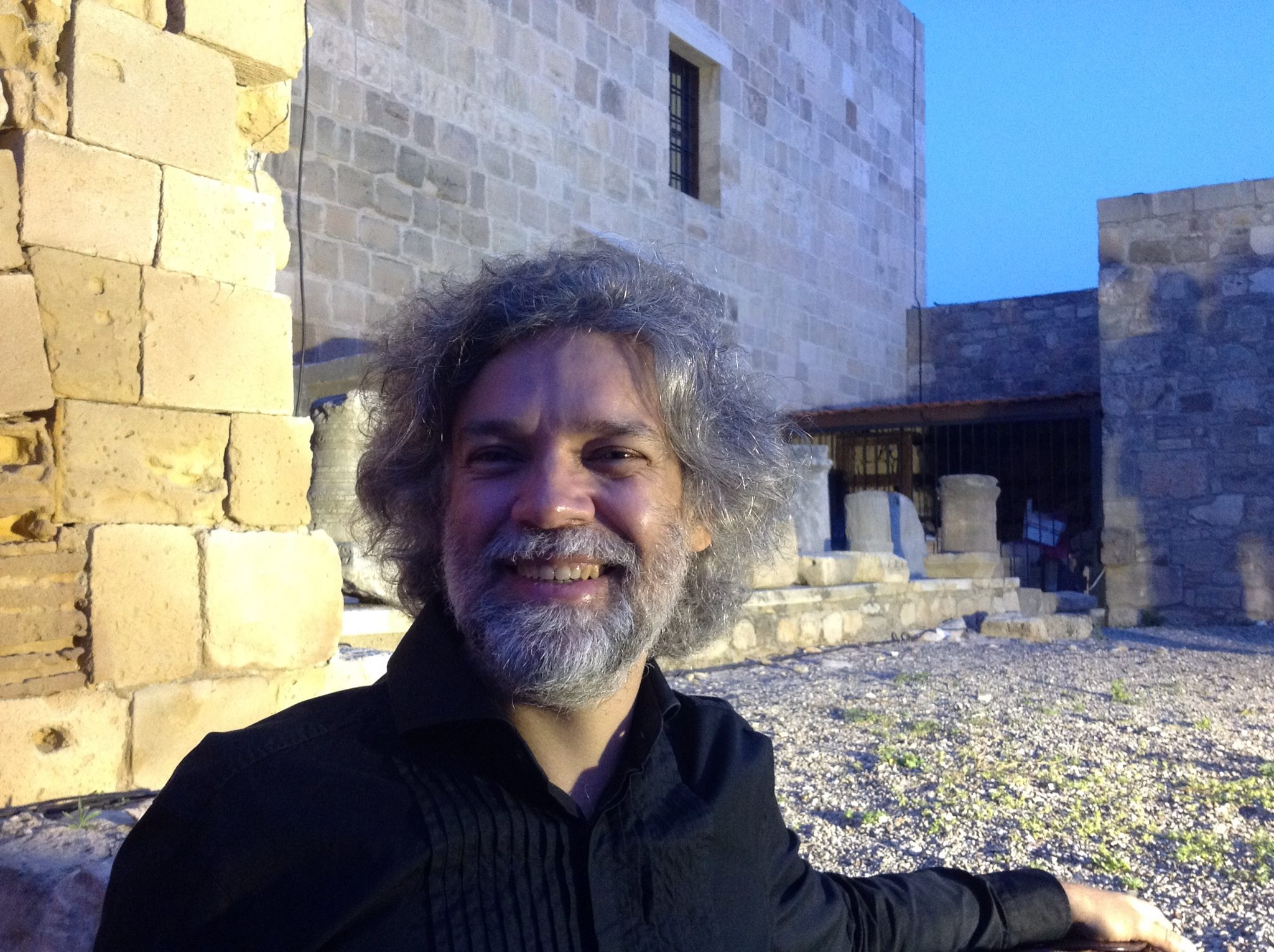
François-Frédéric Guy in Pharos in 2014.

François-Frédéric Guy (born 23 January 1969) is a French classical pianist.

== Life ==
=== Training ===
Born in Vernon, Eure, Guy entered the Conservatoire de Paris at age 11 and worked with Dominique Merlet and Christian Ivaldi. Graduated in 1980, in 1989, he won the first special jury prize at the Munich Competition and in 1992, first prize and the interpretation prize at the Pretoria Unisa Competition. In 1994, he was invited to the Lake Como Foundation and met there Karl Ulrich Schnabel (Artur Schnabel's son), Leon Fleisher, Murray Perahia, Charles Rosen, Fou Ts'ong and Dietrich Fischer-Dieskau.

=== Career ===
Since his debut with the Orchestre de Paris conducted by Wolfgang Sawallisch followed by a live recording of Brahms' 2nd piano concerto with Paavo Berglund and the London Philharmonic Orchestra, Guy established himself as one of the most fascinating pianists of his generation. He has worked alongside internationally renowned conductors such as Daniel Harding, Edvard Gardner, Philippe Jordan, Esa-Pekka Salonen, Michaël Sanderling and also Michael Tilson Thomas. He is a regular guest of the Philharmonia Orchestra and the Radio-France Philharmonic Orchestra. He participates in the Lucerne Festival (with Bernard Haitink and the London Philharmonic Orchestra), the Chopin competition in Varsaw (with the Sinfonia Varsovia), the Festival de La Roque-d'Anthéron in recital and with orchestra, the Printemps des arts de Monte-Carlo, the Festival international de musique de Colmar, the AlpenKlassik in Bad Reichenhall, the Festspielhaus Baden-Baden, and the Beethovenfest in Bonn.

In 2006, François-Frédéric Guy made his debut at The Proms in London with the Philharmonia under the direction of Esa-Pekka Salonen. Passionate about contemporary repertoire, he performs in the most important festivals of contemporary creation such as Musica in Strasbourg, the Festival d'Automne à Paris, the Manca in Nice, the Archipel in Geneva or the Muzikgebouw in Amsterdam, where he performs works by Aurélien Dumon, Ivan Fedele, Christian Lauba, Jacques Lenot, Éric Montalbetti, Gérard Pesson, and Hugues Dufourt who dedicated his Erlkönig to him. In 2012, he premiered Bruno Mantovani's double concerto, as well as the cycle for piano, En pièces by Marc Monnet (Festival Musica of Strasbourg), of which he is the dedicatee.

In November 2011, he made his Moscow debut at the Spivakov Hall. He has performed in recital in London at the Queen Elizabeth Hall and at the Wigmore Hall, as well as the Royal Northern College of Music of Manchester. Since 2008, Guy has dedicated himself to a "Beethoven Project", both on stage and on record. He has given several performances of the 32 sonatas and has just released them on disc for the Zig-Zag Territoires label. To enrich this project, he gave the complete chamber music for piano and strings, alongside Tedi Papavrami and Xavier Phillips (Metz, Monaco, Washington, Geneva...), which he recorded for Evidence Classics.

From 2012, he has been leading Beethoven's and Mozart's concertos from the keyboard with the Orchestre national de Lille, the Orchestre régional Avignon-Provence, the Orchestre de l'Opéra de Limoges, the Sinfonia Varsovia, the Orchestre Philharmonique de Liège, the Orquesta Sinfónica de Tenerife, the Orchestre national des Pays de la Loire and has started a regular collaboration with the Orchestre de chambre de Paris since 2015.

He again gave the complete Beethoven's 32 Sonatas at the Festival Berlioz of La Côte-Saint-André in 2013, Rio de Janeiro in 2015, Tokyo in 2019 and Seoul from 2017 to 2020. Guy began a "Brahms project" in 2016.

In 2017, he made his Vienna debut with the Vienna Symphony, conducted by Philippe Jordan (Béla Bartók's Piano Concerto nº 3).

He can be heard with the Orchestre philharmonique du Luxembourg conducted by Michał Nesterowicz, the Orchestre philharmonique de Radio France and Leon Fleisher, the Orchestre national du Capitole de Toulouse, des Pays de Savoie, l'Orchestre national des Pays de la Loire and Pascal Rophé, the Philharmonia, the Brabant Orkest, the Warsaw National Philharmonic Orchestra and Pablo Gonzalez, the Orquesta Sinfónica del Gran Teatro del Liceu and Josep Pons, the BBC Symphony Orchestra and the Orchestre Symphonique de Québec and Fabien Gabel, the Monte-Carlo Philharmonic Orchestra and Michail Jurowski, at the Zürick Tonhalle with Philippe Jordan, at the Royal Concertgebouw Orchestra of Amsterdam with Marc Albrecht, or in recital in Paris at the Salle Gaveau and the Théâtre des Champs-Élysées, at the Arsenal de Metz, the Grand Théâtre de Provence and in London at the Wigmore Hall and Kings Place.

== Premieres ==
- Éric Tanguy's Piano Sonata No 1 (1996), the work is dedicated to François-Frédéric Guy.
- Hugues Dufourt's Erlkönig (2006), the work is dedicated to François-Frédéric Guy.
- Bruno Mantovani's Double concerto for piano (2012), the work is dedicated to Varduhi Yeritsyan and François-Frédéric Guy.
- Marc Monnet, En pièces, Book 1 (2012), the work is dedicated to François-Frédéric Guy.
- Marc Monnet's Trio n°3 for violin, cello, piano and electronics (2013), the work is dedicated to Tedi Papavrami, Xavier Phillips and François-Frédéric Guy
- Hugues Dufourt, Reine Spannung (2018), the work is dedicated to François-Frédéric Guy.
- Éric Montalbetti, Trois Études après Kandinsky (2018).
- Aurélien Dumont Other Pages (2016), the work is dedicated to François-Frédéric Guy.

== Discography ==
=== Piano ===
- Brahms's Piano sonatas No 2 et 3 (Meridian)
- Beethoven's Sonatas Op. 106 and 109 (Harmonia Mundi, 1998)
- Prokofiev's Sonatas No 6 and 8 (Naïve)
- Beethoven's "Pathetic" sonata 2006)
- Marc Monnet, Imaginary Travel (Zig-Zag Territoires, 2010)
- Liszt's Sonata in B minor – Harmonies poétiques et religieuses (2 CDs Zig-Zag Territoires, March 2011)
- Beethoven's complete sonatas (9 CDs, Zig-Zag Territoires, October 2013)
  - Beethoven's complete sonatas, vol. I (3 CDs, Zig-Zag Territoires, October 2011)
  - Beethoven's complete sonatas, vol. II (3 CDs, Zig-Zag Territoires, April 2012)
  - Beethoven's complete sonatas, vol. III (3 CDs, Zig-Zag Territoires, January 2013)
- Brahms, Sonatas No 1, 2, 3 (Evidence Classics, April 2016)

=== Chamber music ===
- Brahms's Sonatas for clarinet and piano with Romain Guyot (Harmonia Mundi, 1996)
- Brahms's Sonatas for cello and piano with Anne Gastinel (Auvidis)
- Beethoven's Sonatas No 2, 4 and 5 for cello and piano with Anne Gastinel (Naïve Records)
- Beethoven's Sonatas No 1, 3 and Variations for cello and piano with Anne Gastinel (Naïve Records)
- Ludwig van Beethoven: Complete music for cello and piano with Xavier Phillips (Evidence Classics, November 2015)
- Beethoven: Complete Sonatas for violin and piano with Tedi Papavrami (Evidence Classics, October 2017)

=== Concertos ===
- Brahms's Piano Concerto n° 2 - London philharmonic orchestra, Paavo Berglund, conducting, (Naïve, 2004)
- Beethoven's complete concertos for piano and orchestra - Orchestre philharmonique de Radio France, Philippe Jordan conducting (Three CDs, Naïve Records, 2010)

=== DVD ===
- Liszt's Bénédiction de Dieu dans la Solitude; Pensées des Morts; Sonata in B minor (concert, Mirare, 2003)

== Bibliography ==
- Pâris, Alain (2004). Dictionnaire des interprètes et de l'interprétation musicale. Bouquins (in French). Paris: Laffont. p. 370. ISBN 2221080645. OCLC 901287624. Pâris2004.
- Interview by Juliette Duval, in Piano No 27, special issue 2013, p. 5–8
