= David Bismuth =

French pianist

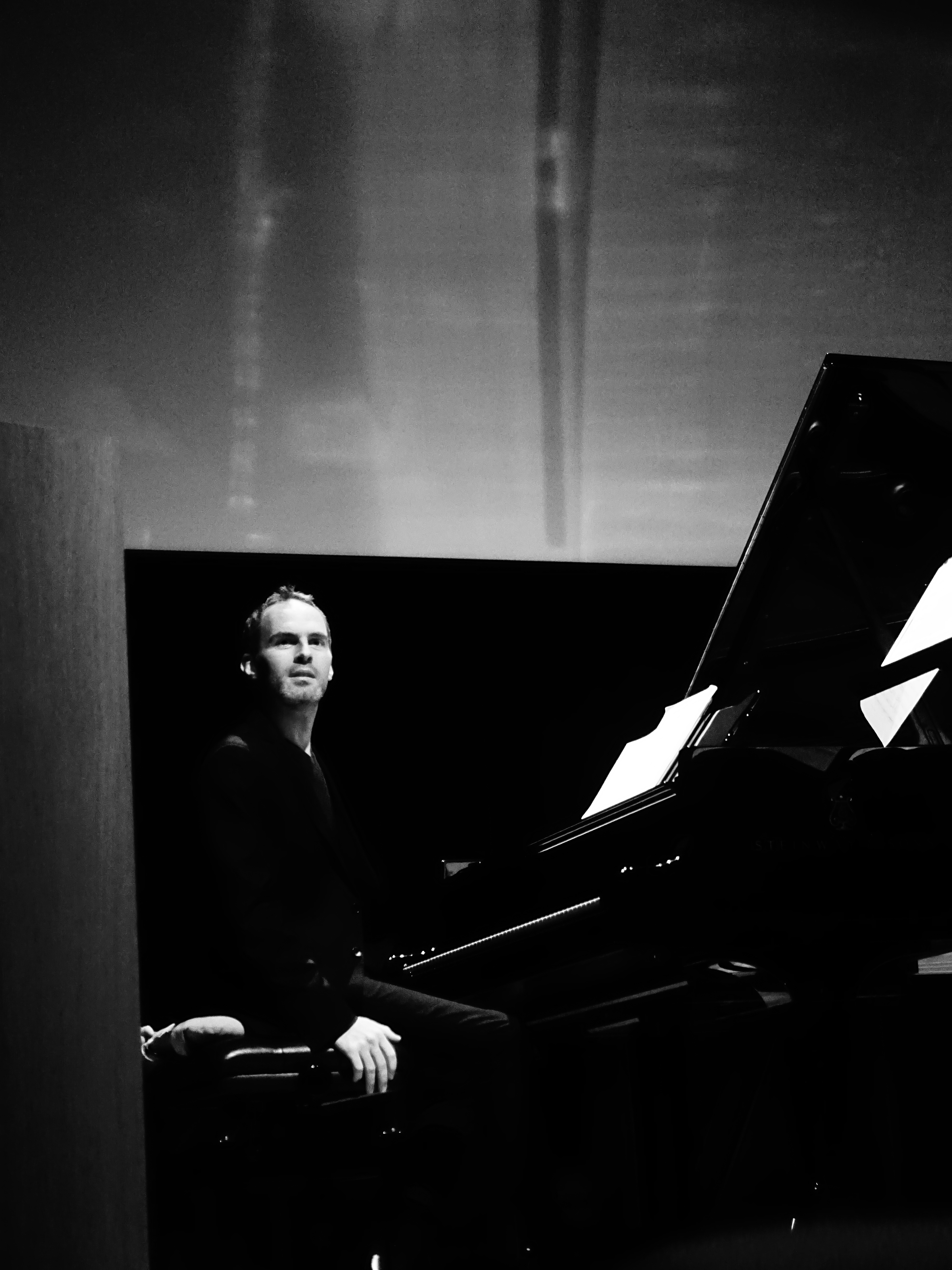
David Bismuth, in concert at Musée Würth, December 2017

David Bismuth (born 10 January 1975) is a French classical pianist.

== Life ==
Born in Nice of music-loving parents, he studied at the Conservatory of Nice with Anne Queffélec and Catherine Collard, then joined Brigitte Engerer's class at the Conservatoire de Paris. He studied with Monique Deschaussées and participated in 2002 in master classes organized by Maria João Pires, with whom he later performed.

Bismuth made his debut with the Orchestre national de France in 2009. He mainly interprets Bach, Mozart, and French composers.

== Discography ==
- César Franck / Gabriel Fauré – Œuvres pour piano issued by AmeSon (2004)
- Paul Dukas / Claude Debussy Sonate / Suites Pour le Piano et Bergamasque, Arabesque n° 1 issued by AmeSon (2006)
- Johann Sebastian B.A.C.H.ianas and transcriptions at AmeSon (2009)
- Rachmaninoff-Saint-Saëns issued by AmeSon (2010)
- Bach Père et Fils issued by AmeSon ( 2014)
- "Beethoven et ses maîtres" issued by AmeSon (2017)
- Paris 1900 (Sonatas by Fauré, Pierné, Saint-Saëns), with violinist Geneviève Laurenceau, issued by Naïve Records(2017)
