= Nicholas Angelich =

American pianist (1970–2022)

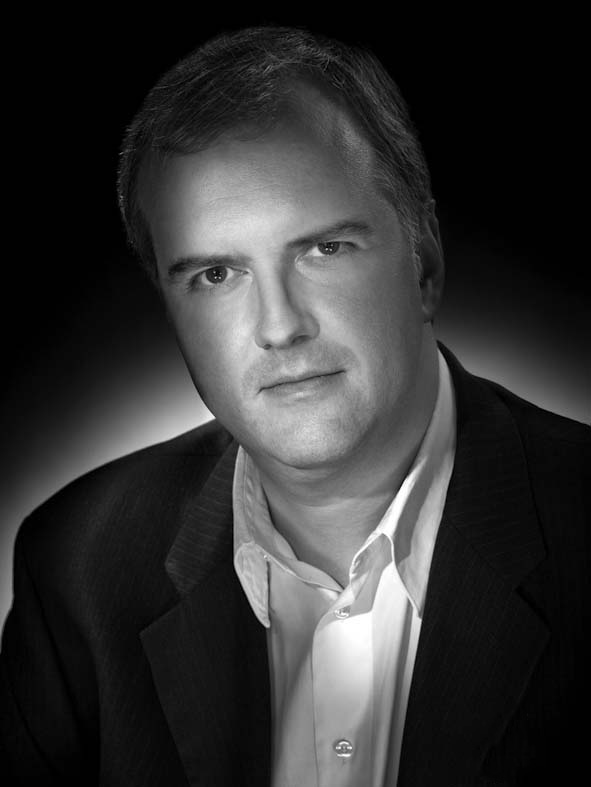
- Publicity photo by Studio Harcourt, 2008
- Born: Nicholas Michael Angelich; December 14, 1970; Cincinnati, Ohio, U.S.
- Died: April 18, 2022 (aged 51); Paris, France
- Occupation: Pianist

Nicholas Michael Angelich (December 14, 1970 – April 18, 2022) was an American pianist. He was noted for performing internationally with ensembles from Europe and North America.

== Early life ==
Angelich was born in Cincinnati, Ohio, on December 14, 1970. His father, Borivoje Andjelitch, was a violinist originally from Montenegro, and his mother, Clara Kadarjan, was a piano teacher from the Soviet Union of Romanian and Slovak descent. They met while studying at the Academy of Music, Belgrade, and he anglicized their family name to Angelich after they emigrated to the United States during the 1960s. Angelich started learning the piano with his mother at the age of five. Two years later, he gave his first concert performing Mozart's Piano Concerto No. 21, K. 467. He relocated to Paris when he was thirteen in order to study at the Conservatoire National Superieur de Musique, where his teachers included Aldo Ciccolini, Yvonne Loriod, Michel Beroff, and Marie-Françoise Bucquet.

== Career ==
Angelich studied with Leon Fleisher during his twenties. In 1989 he won second prize in the Casadesus International Piano Competition in Cleveland, Ohio, and won the first prize of the Gina Bachauer International Piano Competition five years later. He subsequently made his New York recital debut at the Alice Tully Hall in 1995, playing compositions by Franz Schubert, Sergei Rachmaninoff, and Maurice Ravel. His performance received a positive review from Anthony Tommasini, who observed how Angelich "boasts a prodigious technique, but wields it with a poise uncommon in someone so young". Angelich received the Young Talent Award at the 2002 Klavier-Festival Ruhr. He performed with major French orchestras under the conductors Myung-whun Chung and David Robertson. He made his debut with the New York Philharmonic under Kurt Masur in May 2003, playing the Emperor Concerto. He then toured Japan with Masur and the Orchestre National de France the following year. His recording of Brahms trios with Renaud Capuçon and Gautier Capuçon for Erato Records received a Preis der deutschen Schallplattenkritik.

During his 2009–10 tour, Angelich gave recitals in Queen Elizabeth Hall (London), Teatro della Pergola (Florence), Milan Conservatory, The Hague, and Theatre du Chatelet (Paris). Considered one of the great pianists of our time, he was featured on the cover of the October 2009 issue of International Piano, whose feature article is about his recording of Brahms's Op. 116 to Op. 119 on the Erato Records label. He later performed Ravel's Concerto for the Left Hand at the opening of the Royal Scottish National Orchestra's 2010–11 season in Dundee's Caird Hall, Edinburgh's Usher Hall and Glasgow Royal Concert Hall from September 23 to 25 under conductor Stéphane Denève.

Angelich again played under Denève with the Philadelphia Orchestra in 2018. He stopped performing in 2021, but intended to close the 2021–22 season of the Orchestre Métropolitain in Montreal with two planned concerts in June 2022.

== Personal life ==
Angelich died on April 18, 2022 at the age of 51 following rejection of a lung transplant performed at the Bichat–Claude Bernard Hospital in Paris due to a chronic degenerative lung disease. He did not have any immediate survivors.
