= Emmanuel Strosser =

French pianist

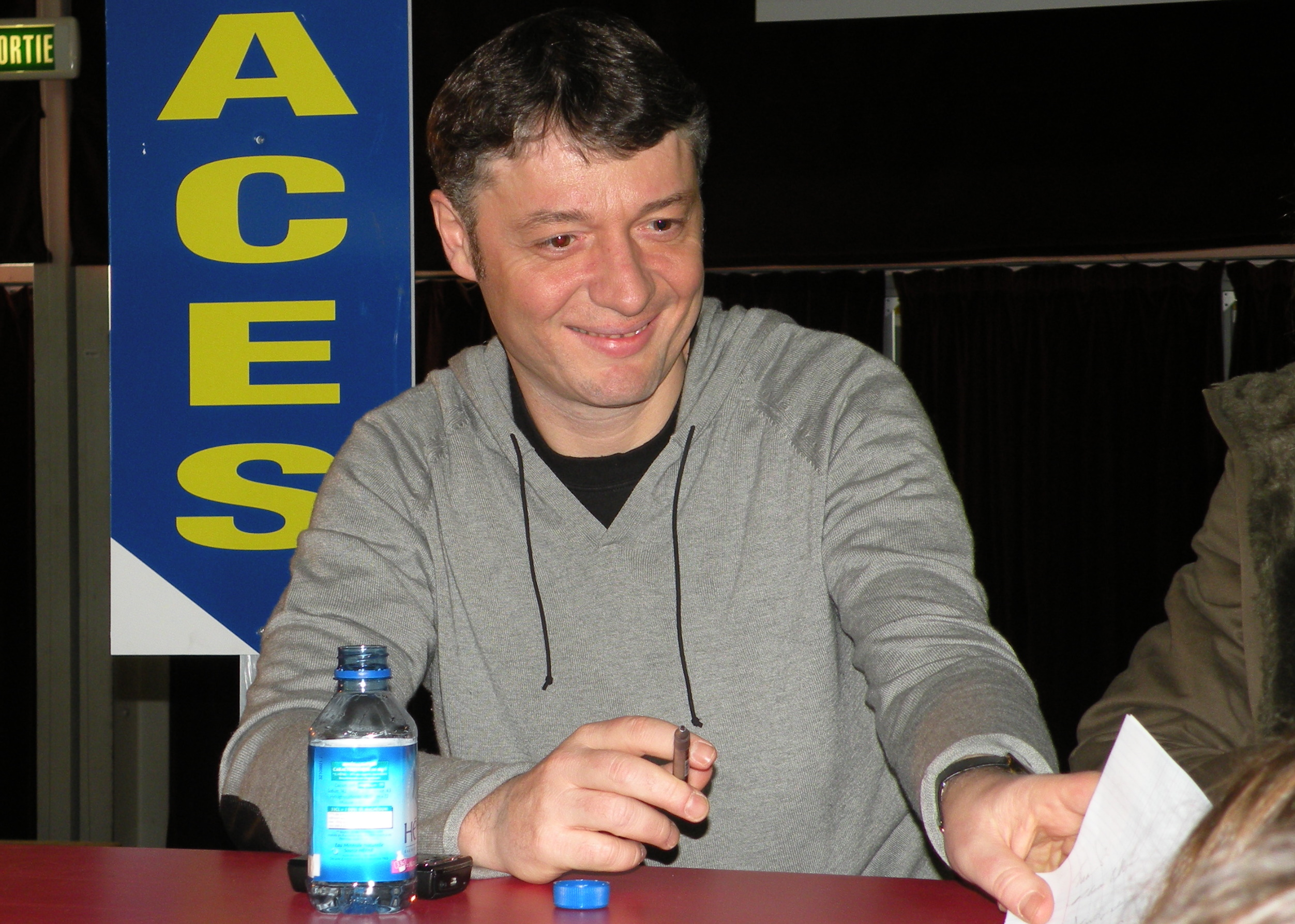
Emmanuel Strosser

Emmanuel Strosser (born 4 May 1965 in Strasbourg), the son of theatre director Pierre Strosser, is a French classical pianist.

== Biography ==
Strosser first studied with Hélène Boschi then at the Conservatoire de Paris with Jean-Claude Pennetier and Christian Ivaldi. He is a piano teacher at the Conservatoire de Paris and a professor of chamber music at the Conservatoire national supérieur de musique et de danse de Lyon. Emmanuel Strosser is the author of an important discography, particularly in chamber music: Gabriel Fauré's two quintets with the Rosamonde Quartet, and the Slavonic Dances by Antonín Dvořák for piano four hands with Claire Désert among others.
