= Cécile Hugonnard-Roche =

French pianist and piano assistant teacher

Cécile Hugonnard-Roche is a French pianist and piano assistant teacher at the Conservatoire de Paris and has taught at the École normale de musique de Paris.

As of 2016, Hugonnard-Roche teaches the piano at the Saint-Maur-des-Fossés conservatory.

== Biography ==
Hugonnard-Roche studied music at the Conservatoire de Paris where she was taught by Vlado Perlemuter, Jean Hubeau and Dominique Merlet. There she won four First Prizes: piano, chamber music, harmony and accompaniment.

Thanks to a postgraduate scholarship, she spent two years perfecting her skills with foreign masters, thus broadening and deepening her repertoire.

Second prize (first nominated) at the Geneva International Music Competition in 1976, she also won the Schumann Prize and the Alex de Vries Foundation Prize (Antwerp).

Since then, she has been invited to play regularly in numerous festivals and has performed as soloist and chamber music throughout Europe, Brazil, Southeast Asia and Japan.

For the label "Quantum" she has recorded a CD dedicated to Robert Schumann, a second to Prokofiev and a third of French two-piano music with André Cauvin.

For "Bayard Musique", she records in the series Les Grands Chefs-d'œuvre, Schumann's Fantasy pieces and Mozart's Piano Sonata No. 11.

Cécile Hugonnard-Roche expresses with sensitivity and determination the passionate vehemences, tensions and lyricism, highlighting the overall architecture... An artist who makes the piano sing

— Jean Dupart, in Compact
