= Goffriller =

Goffriller is a surname. Notable people with the surname include:

- Francesco Goffriller (1692–1750), Italian violin, viola and cello maker
- Matteo Goffriller (1659–1742), Venetian luthier
