= Pablo Márquez (guitarist) =

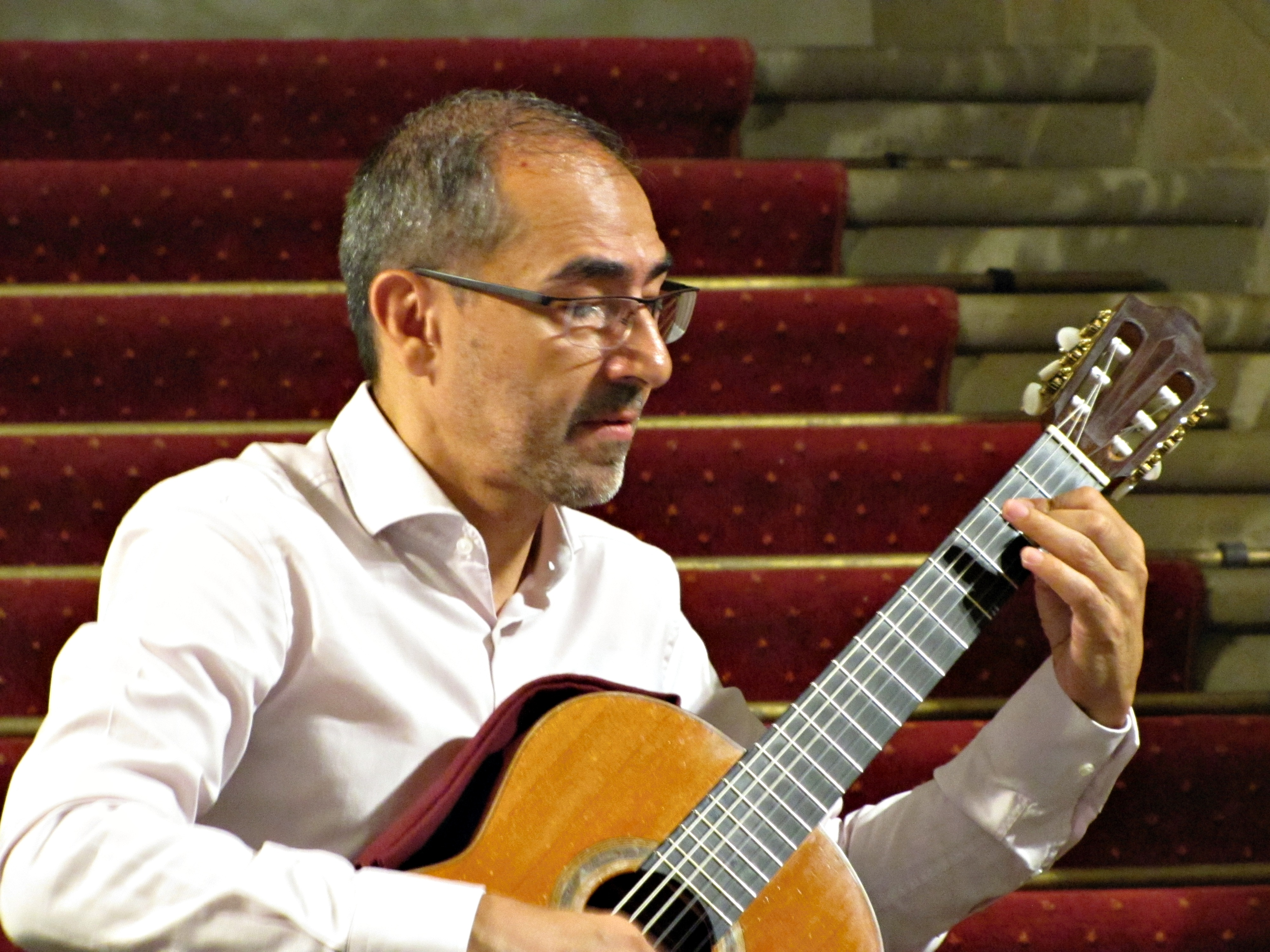

Background information
- Origin: Argentina
- Genres: Classical guitar
- Occupation: Guitarist
- Instrument: Guitar
- Website: www.pablomarquez.com ecmrecords.com/artists/pablo-marquez/

Pablo Márquez (Born 1967) is an Argentinean guitarist. Born in Argentina, he is best known for his interpretations of historical classical works as well as his performances of Argentinean traditional music. He is also a professor at the Musik-Akademie of Basel.

== Early life and education ==
Márquez started his guitar studies at the age of 10 and gave his first performance three years later with an orchestra in Salta, north-western Argentina, where he grew up and received his first training. Márquez then studied in Buenos Aires with Jorge Martínez Zárate and Eduardo Fernández. He won first prizes at the Villa-Lobos and Radio France international competitions in Rio de Janeiro and Paris respectively. He won later prizes at competitions in Geneva and Munich. As a musician, Márquez studied conducting with Eric Sobzyck, Rodolfo Fischer and Peter Eötvös, and followed the teaching of pianist György Sebők.

== Career ==
Over the span of Márquez's career, he has performed at concert halls in more than 40 countries, including Concertgebouw in Amsterdam, Teatro Colón of Buenos Aires, Herkulessaal in Munich, and both the Théâtre du Châtelet and Opéra Comique in Paris, and continued to perform at international music festivals. He collaborated with Anja Lechner, Anne Gastinel, Patricia Kopatchinskaja, the Rosamunde Quartett of Munich, Dino Saluzzi and María Cristina Kiehr. He performs regularly as a soloist with orchestras and ensembles, including Bayerischer Rundfunk of Munich, Orchestre Philharmonique de Radio France, Philharmonie Baden-Baden, and Nouvel Ensemble Moderne de Montreal, under the baton of Josep Pons, Susanna Mälkki, Lorraine Vaillancourt, Fabián Panisello and others.

== Awards and recognitions ==
Márquez's various recordings, released through the ECM New Series, Naïve Records and Kairos labels, have received such prizes as the Grand Prix du Disque of the Académie Charles Cros, the Italian Amadeus Prize and the RTL Classique d’Or.

Márquez received the Konex Prize for lifetime achievement for being a great musician , and in 2006 was announced as an Honorary Citizen of Salta, Argentina.
