= Emmanuel Rossfelder =

French classical guitarist

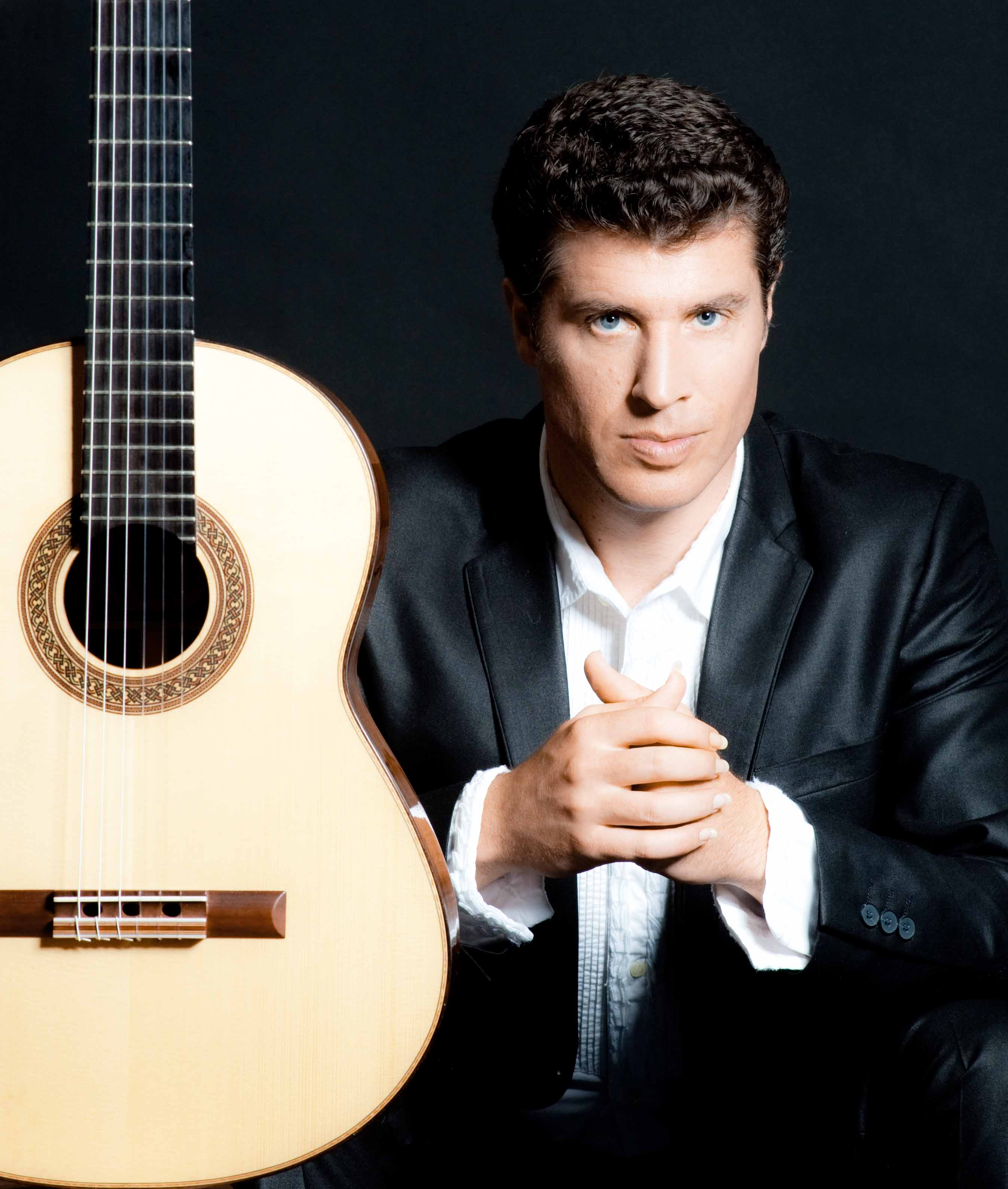
Emmanuel Rossfelder in 2002

Emmanuel Rossfelder (born 1973) is a French classical guitarist.

== Life ==
Rossfelder started playing the guitar at the age of 5. He started as a student of Raymond Gellier. At the age of 8, he entered the Conservatoire de musique of Aix en Provence in Bertrand Thomas' class. At the age of 14, he obtained the gold medal from the Conservatoire of Aix-en-Provence and became a student of Alexandre Lagoya at the Conservatoire de Paris. He was then the youngest guitarist to join the classes of the master. At only 18 years old he obtained his prize from the Conservatoire de Paris. In 2004, he was named Instrumental Soloist Revelation of the Year at the Victoires de la musique classique.

Rossfelder has recorded 4 solo CDs and one DVD. The release of his latest CD, Joaquin Rodrigo's Concierto de Aranjuez as well as the Fantasía para un gentilhombre with the Orchestre d'Auvergne conducted by Arie Van Beek, will mark his 20-year career.

In 2011, he played the part of Gilbert Bécaud in Cloclo by Florent Emilio Siri.

== Discography ==
- Danses latines (2001, Distribution Harmonia Mundi)
- La guitare lyrique (2004, Distribution Harmonia Mundi)
- Sueno (2006, Distribution Harmonia Mundi)
- Bach... Haendel Scarlatti Weiss (2009, Distribution Harmonia Mundi)
- Le Maitre et l'Élève : Danses pour Cordes (Collection 1001 Notes, 2010 Intégral Classique)
- Joaquin Rodrigo: Concert d'Aranjuez - Fantaisie pour un Gentilhomme (23 October 2012 Distribution Harmonia Mundi)
- Virtuoso (M'L'Art Production - Label Loreley)
