= Zhu Xiao-Mei =

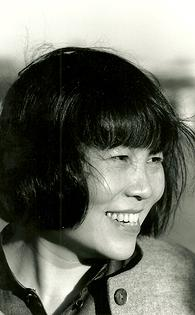

Background information
- Born: 1949 (age 76–77); Shanghai, China
- Origin: Beijing
- Genres: Classical
- Occupation: Musician
- Instrument: Piano
- Years active: 1957–present

Zhu Xiao-Mei (Chinese: 朱晓玫; pinyin: Zhū Xiǎoméi, born 1949) is a Chinese French classical pianist and teacher, now based in Paris, France.

== Biography ==
Zhu Xiao-Mei was born in Shanghai in 1949. Her music studies started early, and she played on Beijing radio and television by the age of 8. Two years later, she entered into the National School of Music for gifted children, and also attended the Central Conservatory of Music. She currently teaches at Conservatoire Supérieur de Paris, living by the Seine in Paris, France. She maintains a modest lifestyle and is one of the most talented and respected Chinese pianists of the century.

=== 1957–1975: Cultural Revolution Years ===
Coming from an artistic family, she stepped onto the stage of Radio channels in Beijing to play piano at the age of 8. She graduated with excellent academic achievement from the high school affiliated with the Central Conservatory of Music in 1962. During the Cultural Revolution, Zhu was dispatched to Zhangjiakou, Hebei Province for 5 years. She returned to Beijing in 1975. When China resumed the College Entrance Exam policy, Zhu's age only allowed her to be enrolled in the class of advanced studies at the Central Conservatory of Music. She then started to teach piano lessons at Beijing Dancing Academy.

=== 1979: Master's Degree in Piano Music: The New England Conservatory of Music ===
Her life-changing event was when the American violinist Isaac Stern visited China in 1979, which eventually contributed to Zhu's study in the United States. She began to study at the New England Conservatory of Music in Boston in 1980, from which she received her master's degree in Piano Music.

=== 1985: Move to Paris ===
Just when she was losing hope in the States, Zhu got the chance to pursue her dream in Paris, France in 1985, just 2 days before her U.S. visa expired. At the beginning, she could barely make ends meet, but with the admiration and generous help of one professor in the Conservatoire Supérieur de Paris, she was offered a teaching position in the school and a budget accommodation in which to live. She had 7 different places where she could practice piano for free. With the help of friends, her piano skills started to draw attention both from Europe and South America, leading to several music concerts and recitals in those areas.

=== 1980s until today: Golden Years and recent activity ===
Without an agent's promotion, she managed to make her impact in the classical music circle, focusing her interest on a handful of composers of whom she was particularly fond. During these years playing piano in Paris, every single one of her recitals was sold out. Then she started to go on tours in Europe, North America, South America, Asia, and even Australia.

Mirare had published many of her records. Her interests include the Goldberg Variations, Domenico Scarlatti, Joseph Haydn, Mozart, Beethoven, Schubert and Schumann, but it is Bach who remains at the heart of her music universe. And she is now widely recognized as one of his leading exponents . Of Bach's keyboard works, she has already recorded The Well-Tempered Clavier, the Partitas, The Art of the Fugue, the Inventions and Sinfonias and the Goldberg Variations. Her first album was completed at the age of 50.

In 1994, Zhu was invited to perform a piano recital in Théatre de la Ville, which was also her first public performance as a pianist in Paris.

Her autobiography, The Secret Piano: From Mao's Labor Camps to Bach's Goldberg Variations was published by Robert Laffont in 2007 and won the 2008 Grand Prix des Muses. It has been translated into many other languages.

In 2014, Zhu was invited to perform in the St. Thomas Church, Leipzig, where Bach had worked for 23 years. Zhu was the first pianist to perform in this church. The DVD and CD of this recital have received a Special Achievement Award at the International Classical Music Awards.

She performed in China for the first time in 2014, after an absence of 35 years. While she received the title of professor emeritus at the Beijing Conservatory, the same year she was honored with the title of "Chevalier of Ordre des Arts et des Lettres" by The Ministry of Culture, France.
