= Marie-Françoise Bucquet =

French pianist (1937–2018)

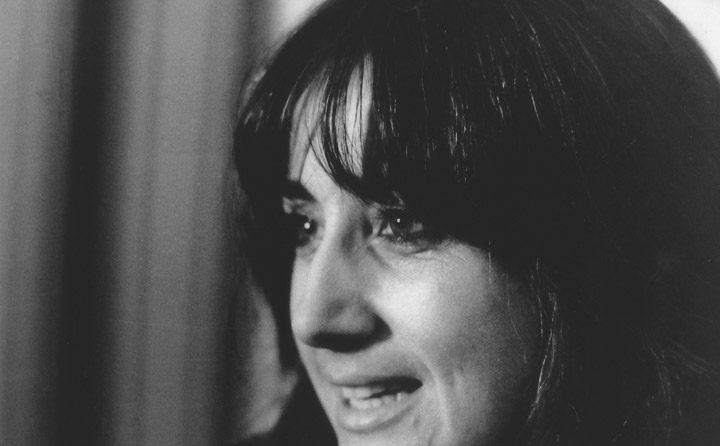

Background information
- Born: 28 October 1937; Montivilliers, France
- Died: 15 August 2018
- Genres: classical
- Instrument: piano

Marie-Françoise Bucquet (28 October 1937 – 15 August 2018) was a French pianist.

== Biography ==
Born in Montivilliers, Marie-Françoise Bucquet began her studies at the Vienna Music Academy and continued this tradition by further studies with Central European musicians: the eminent pianist Wilhelm Kempff and later another eminent pianist, Alfred Brendel. The influence of Edouard Steuermann and Max Deutsch, who were both pupils of Schoenberg, and Pierre Boulez made her also a specialist in 20th-century music. Composers such as Betsy Jolas, Iannis Xenakis and Sylvano Bussotti wrote works especially for her.

Repeated concert tours which Bucquet made as a soloist and with orchestra ranged over much of the world. For the Philips label she recorded works by, among others, Bizet, Bartók, Stockhausen and Stravinsky. In 1976 she was awarded an Edison for one of her Schoenberg recordings. She gave numerous master classes in Italy, Spain, the United States, Japan, and (regularly from 1988) the Netherlands, the last-named being The International Holland Music Sessions.

From 1986 till her death, Bucquet was professor of piano at the Conservatoire de Paris where she was appointed Head of the Pedagogical Department and member of the Board in 1991. In 1979 she formed a duo with her husband, baritone Jorge Chaminé. Their discography includes several award-winning recordings: songs by Brahms (Lyrinx-Harmonia Mundi); songs by Carlos Guastavino (Movieplay Classics); songs by various composers to Hebrew texts (ADDA) and, in 2002, Spanish-language songs by Falla, Joaquin Turina and the Cuban Joaquin Nin. This last release was for, again, Lyrinx-Harmonia Mundi.

Along with her husband, Bucquet organised each year an Atelier Musical in Paris, this event having been held in collaboration with the Centre Culturel Calouste Gulbenkian, and having involved special lessons in interpretation and performance. In addition, she served as jury member at many international piano competitions, among them the International Piano Competition in Dublin. She died in August 2018.
