= Bruno Mantovani =

French composer (born 1974)

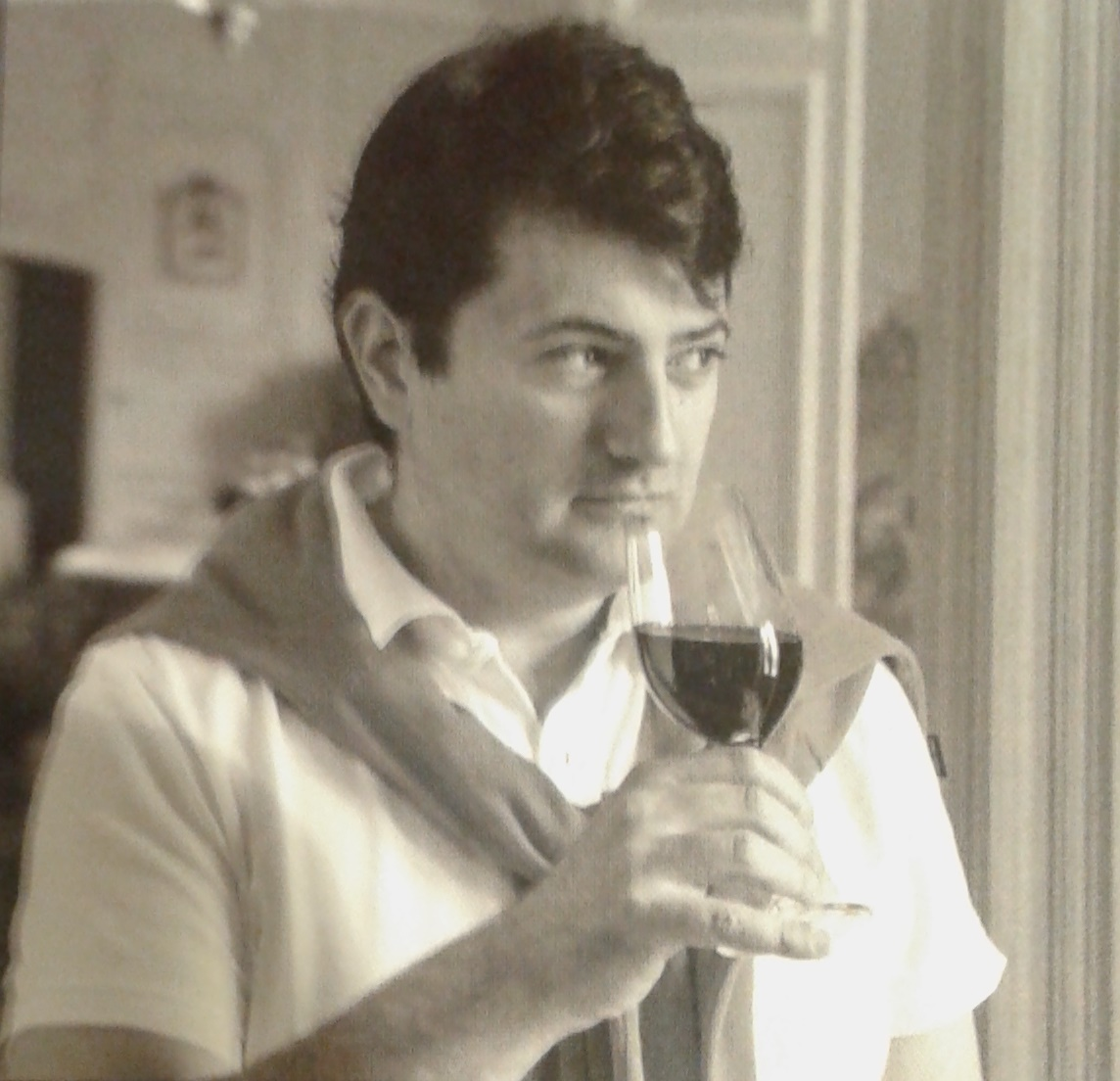
Bruno Mantovani

Bruno Mantovani (born 8 October 1974) is a French composer. He has been awarded first prizes from the Conservatoire de Paris which he joined in 1993. His work has been commissioned by the French government as well as other organisations. In September 2010, he was appointed to the post of director of the Paris Conservatory.

== Biography ==
At 37, Bruno Mantovani became the director of the Conservatoire de Paris.

In October 2018, his new composition Threnos was premiered at the Chicago Symphony Orchestra and conducted by Marin Alsop. In March 2019, he was named music director of the Ensemble Orchestral Contemporain, a position that began in January 2020.

== Awards ==
- 2010 Claudio-Abbado-Kompositionspreis of the Orchester-Akademie of the Berlin Philharmonic

== Works list ==
=== Orchestra ===
- Art d'écho, for orchestra, 2000
- Con Leggerezza, for orchestra, 2004
- Concerto pour deux altos et orchestre, for two violas and orchestra, 2009
- Concerto pour deux pianos, for two pianos and orchestra 2012
- Concerto pour violoncelle, for cello and orchestra, 2005
- Fantaisie, for piano and orchestra, 2010
- Finale, for orchestra, 2007
- Jeux d'eau, for violin and orchestra, 2011
- Le Cycle des gris, for orchestra, 2005
- Le Livre des illusions, for orchestra, 2009
- Mit Ausdruck, for bass clarinet and orchestra, 2003
- On the dance floor, for orchestra, 2003
- 6 Pièces for orchestra, 2005
- Postludium, for orchestra, 2010
- Siddharta, ballet, 2010
- Smatroll (Le Lutin), for orchestra, 2010
- Time Stretch (on gesualdo), for orchestra, 2006
- Upon one note, for orchestra, 2011
- Zapping, for flute and orchestra, 2004

=== Ensemble music ===
- ...273..., for 17 musicians, 2010
- Concerto de chambre no.1, for 17 musicians, 2010
- Concerto de chambre no.2, for 6 musicians, 2010
- 2 Contrepoints de l'Art de la Fugue, for 7 cellos, 2007
- D'un rêve parti, for sextet, 2000
- Eclair de Lune, for three ensembles and electronics, 2007
- Le Sette Chiese, for large ensemble, 2002
- Les Danses interrompues, for 6 instruments, 2001
- Par la suite, for flute and ensemble, 2002
- Série Noire, for 14 instruments, 2000
- Si près, si loin (d'une fantaisie), for two pianos and two ensembles, 2007
- Spirit of Alberti, for ensemble, 2013
- Streets, for ensemble, 2006
- Troisième Round, for saxophone and ensemble, 2001
- Turbulences, for 12 musicians, 1998

=== Chamber music ===
- All'ungarese, for violin and piano, 2009
- Appel d'air, for flute and piano, 2001
- Blue girl with red wagon, for string quartet and piano, 2005
- D'une seule voix, for violin and cello, 2007
- Da Roma, for clarinet, viola and piano, 2005
- East side, west side, for five instruments, 2003
- Face à face, for four clarinets, 2010
- Happy B., for flute, violin, viola and cello, 2005
- Haunted Nights, for clarinet, piano and vibraphone, 2002
- Hopla, for flute and boules de pétanque, 2010
- Icare, for two pianos, 2009
- L'Ere de rien, for flute, clarinet and piano, 2002
- L'Incandescence de la bruine, for saxophone and piano, 1997
- METAL, for two clarinets, 2003
- 8 Moments musicaux, for violin, cello and piano, 2008
- 5 Pièces pour Paul Klee, for cello and piano, 2007
- 4 Pièces pour quatuor à cordes, (Bleu, les Fées, L'Ivresse, BWV 1007), 2005
- Quelques effervescences, for viola and piano, 2006
- Quintette, for 2 violins, 2 violas and cello, 2013
- Quintette pour Bertold Brecht, for harp and string quartet, 2007
- Un mois d'octobre, for bassoon and piano, 2001
- Un Souffle, for flute and 4 percussions, 2005
- Une autre incandescence for clarinet, viola and piano, 1998
- Until, for 3 cellos, 2010
- You are connected, for string trio, 2001

=== Solo ===
- 8'20" chrono, for accordion, 2007
- Bug, for clarinet, 1999
- Dédale, for piano, 2009
- Entre Parenthèses, for piano, 2006
- 4 Etudes, for piano, 2003
- Früh, for flute, 2001
- Happy hours, for violin, 2007
- Italienne, for piano, 2001
- Jazz Connotation, for piano, 1998
- Le Grand jeu, for percussion and electronics, 1999
- Le Livre de Jeb, for piano, 2009
- Little Italy, for viola, 2005
- 4 Mélodies arméniennes, for flute, 2010
- Moi jeu..., for marimba, 1999
- One-Way, for cello, 2012
- Suonare, for piano, 2006
- The worst of, for piano, 2013
- Tocar, for harp, 2007
- Trait d'union, for clarinet, 2007

=== Vocal or choral music ===
- Akhmatova (opera), opera premiered at Opera Bastille, 2011
- Cantate No.1, for chorus and ensemble, 2006
- Cantate No.2 (sur G. Leopardi), for soprano and clarinet, 2008
- Cantate No.3 (sur Friedrich von Schiller), for chorus and orchestra, 2012
- Cantate No.4, for cello, accordion and chorus, 2013
- Das erschafft der Dichter nicht, for soprano and ensemble, 2002
- L'Autre côté, opera, 2006
- La Morte Meditata, for mezzo-soprano and ensemble, 2000
- L'Enterrement de Mozart, for 5 voices and ensemble, 2008
- Monde évanoui (Fragments pour Babylone), for chorus, 2008
- 5 Poèmes de Janos Pilinsky, for chamber chorus, 2005
- Vier Geistliche Gedichte, for chamber chorus, 2007
- Voyage d'automne (Autumn journey), opera in three acts, first performed at the Capitole de Toulouse in 2024
