= Christian Ivaldi =

French pianist

- Born: 2 September 1938 (age 87); Paris, France
- Education: Paris Conservatory
- Genres: Classical Music
- Occupation: Musician
- Instruments: Piano

Christian Ivaldi (born 2 September 1938) is a French classical pianist.

== Biography ==
Ivaldi was born in Paris. He studied at the Paris Conservatory with Jacques Février and took a Premier Prix in piano performance, as well as in chamber music, counterpoint, and accompaniment.

He made his debut as a soloist on Radio France in 1961.. He has premiered pieces by Gilbert Amy, Georges Aperghis, André Boucourechliev, Maurice Ohana, and Luis de Pablo among others. He is considered 'a remarkable musician' by [source]".
