= Jean-Frédéric Neuburger =

French pianist, organist, and composer (born 1986)

Jean-Frédéric Neuburger (born 29 December 1986) is a French pianist, organist, and composer. His repertoire extends from Bach to Barraqué and the works of his own contemporaries.

He was born in Paris on 29 December 1986. When he was eight years old he began studying piano at the Académie Maurice Ravel in Saint-Jean de Luz and then added studies in organ and composition. He entered the Conservatoire National Supérieur de Musique de Paris in 2000, where he received highest honors in piano, accompaniment, improvisation at the piano and at the organ, and chamber music.

He has won a number of prizes including First Prize at the 2002 Ettlingen International Competition for Young Pianists; Second Prize and the Beethoven Prize at the 2004 José Iturbi Piano Competition; Third Grand Prix, the Orchestre Philharmonique de Radio France Prize, the Audience Favorite Prize and the Sacem Prize at the 2004 Long-Thibaud Competition in Paris; and Second Prize at the 2005 London International Piano Competition. He won the 2006 Young Concert Artists International Auditions, where he was also awarded the John Browning Memorial Prize and the Rhoda Walker Teagle Prize, which in December 2006 sponsored his New York debut at Zankel Hall and his debut recital in Washington, D..C, at the Kennedy Center. He also won First Prize in the 2005 Young Concert Artists European Auditions.

In 2014, the Auditorium du Louvre held a series of seven concerts entitled "Jean-Frédéric Neuburger and Friends" in which he was featured as both performer and composer.

Since 2009, he has taught the renowned Classe d'Accompagnement at the Conservatoire de Paris.

He has played the premiere performances of many works including Alberti by Christian Lauba at the festival Les Semaines musicales in Quimper in 2013 and at the Strasbourg music festival in 2014.

His compositions include:

- Maldoror, for piano, lasting around twenty minutes, inspired by the poems of Lautréamont Chants de Maldoror (1868). (Note: "One may detect in it a hotchpotch of influences, including Stockhausen, Xenakis for the fragmentation of the piano at certain points, and probably even the Schumann of the Phantasiestücke. In addition to the traditional virtuosity demanded by the work, the pianist must prepare the strings of four bass notes in order to produce a deformed sound, more percussive in nature, while still retaining the resonant aspect of the piano. However, we are not dealing here with a genuine percussion-piano in the manner of John Cage, but rather an imaginary organ pedalboard and deformations, almost to the point of ugliness, of the attacks in the instrument's bottom register.")
- Cantate profane, a cantata for an ensemble of 14 musicians with a mixed choir, using two poems by Aimé Césaire; commissioned by Radio France
- Souffle sur les cendres, for piano and violin]
- Danse encore!, for string trio and piano]
- Aube (2015), first performance by the Boston Symphony Orchestra on 12 November 2015, under Christoph von Dohnányi
