= Raphaël Pidoux =

French cellist

Raphaël Pidoux (1967) is a contemporary French classical cellist.

== Biography ==
Pidoux started studying the cello with his father Roland Pidoux. In 1987 he won the First Prize of the Conservatoire de Paris in Philippe Muller's class. He perfected his skills in the University of Indiana with Janos Starker. As a chamber musician, he studied with Menahem Pressler and members of the Amadeus Quartet at the Hochschule für Musik und Tanz Köln. In 1988, he won the ARD International Music Competition in Munich as well as the third Prize of the International Johann Sebastian Bach Competition in Leipzig.

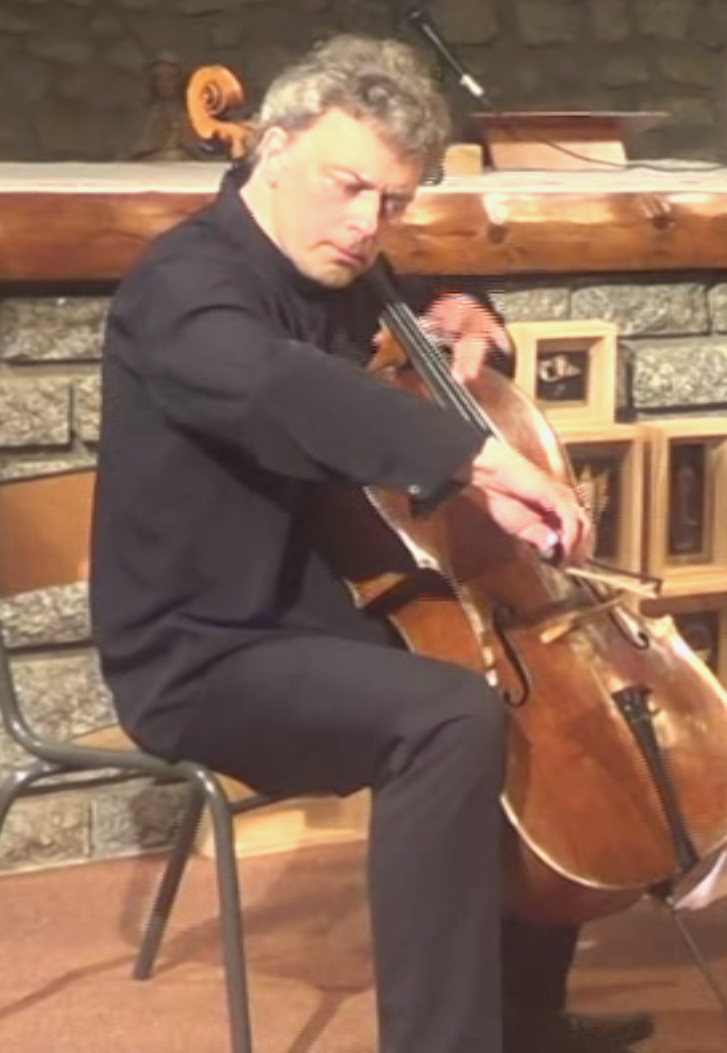
Raphaël Pidoux at Vollore-Montagne (Puy-de-Dôme) on 17 July 2014

Pidoux played on a 1680 cello by Goffredo Cappa.

=== The Trio Wanderer ===
RPidoux was the cellist of the Trio Wanderer with which he has led an international career playing in the Théâtre des Champs-Élysées, the Wigmore Hall of London, the Herkulessaal of Munich, the Konzerthaus, Vienna and Konzerthaus Berlin, the Concertgebouw of Amsterdam, the Musikverein of Graz, La Scala of Milan.

The Trio Wanderer performed at the Salzbourg, Edimbourg, Montreux, Feldkirch, Schleswig Holstein, Stresa, Osaka festivals, but also at the Festival de La Roque-d'Anthéron, in La Folle Journée of Nantes.

The Trio Wanderer played under the direction of Yehudi Menuhin, Christopher Hogwood, Charles Dutoit and James Conlon, with the Orchestre National de France, the Orchestre Philharmonique de Radio-France, the Orchestre national d'Île-de-France, the Nice, Pays de Loire, Montpellier, Teneriffe, and La Coruna orchestras, the Deutsches Symphonie-Orchester Berlin, the Sinfonia Varsovia, the Grazer Philharmoniker Orchester, the Stockholm Chamber Orchestra, the Gürzenich Orchestra Cologne, and also along Wolfgang Holzmair, François Leleux, Paul Meyer, Pascal Moraguès, Antoine Tamestit, and others.

The Trio Wanderer won three Victoires de la musique classique in 1997, 2000 and 2009.

=== Chamber music ===
Chamber music was an important part of Pidoux's career. He played alone or in the company of Christophe Coin and the Ensemble baroque de Limoges, Emmanuel Pahud, Raphaël Oleg, the Manfred, Modigliani, Mosaïques quartets, the orchestra Les Siècles led by François-Xavier Roth.

In 2008, Pidoux was one of the co-founders of Les Violoncelles français octet with Emmanuelle Bertrand, Éric-Maria Couturier, Emmanuel Gaugué, Xavier Phillips, Roland Pidoux, Nadine Pierre and François Salque.

== Teaching and pedagogy ==
In September 2014, Raphael Pidoux started teaching at the Conservatoire de Paris where he succeeded his former teacher Philippe Muller.

He was a member of juries at the Conservatoire de Paris and the Conservatoire national supérieur musique et danse de Lyon, of international juries such as the ARD International Music Competition of Munich (discipline cello and trio with piano), International Competition of Graz (discipline trio with piano).

He had been the guest of Master-classes at the University of Seoul, the Conservatory of Madrid, the Toho Gakuen School of Music of Tokyo (at the invitation of Tsuyoshi Tsutsumi).

Since 2009, he had been vice-president of the "association Talents & Violoncelles," whose objective is to lend instruments to young cellists from modest backgrounds. The association brings together luthiers, donors and young virtuosos: it supports both the creation of cellos from the great tradition of French lutherie and the young musicians too often deprived of good instruments. This initiative has been welcomed by the music press.

In 2010, he created the Biennale "VioloncellEnSeine", of which he was the artistic director, organized by the "Association française du Violoncelle". During the 2010 edition, there was an international contest of violin making and archery, a national competition of young cellists for 8/16 years old, open concerts, a colloquium, exhibitions. The second edition took place in 2012. The third edition took place from 12 to 14 December 2014 at the Paris RRC.

== Discography ==
=== With the Trio Wanderer ===
==== By Harmonia Mundi ====
- Pyotr Ilyich Tchaikovsky, Anton Arensky, trio Op. 50 & Trio n° 1 Op. 32 (2013) HMC902161.
- Ludwig van Beethoven, Intégrale des trios avec piano 4CD (2012) HMC902100.03
- Ludwig van Beethoven, Triple Concerto Op. 56, recorded with the Gürzenich-Orchester Kölner Philharmoniker, under the direction of James Conlon (2001, reissued in 2012) HMG502131
- Camille Saint-Saëns, Trios Op. 18 & Op. 92 (2012) HMA1951862
- Franz Liszt, Smetana, Tristia, Elégies, Trio Op. 15 (2011) HMC902060
- Gabriel Fauré, Quatuor avec piano Op. 15 & Op. 45 with Antoine Tamestit (viola) (2010) HMC902032
- Joseph Haydn, Trios Hob. XV: 27, 28, 29, 25 (2009) HMG501968
- Olivier Messiaen, Quatuor pour la fin du temps, with Pascal Moraguès (clarinet) (2008) HMC901987
- Franz Schubert, Johann Nepomuk Hummel, Quintet Op. 114 Trout Quintet, Quintet Op. 87 with Christophe Gaugué (viola), Stéphane Logerot (double bass) (2008) HMG501792
- Franz Schubert, Integrale of the trios with piano, Op. 99 & 100 (2008) 2CD HMC902002.03
- Felix Mendelssohn, Trios Op. 49 & Op. 66 (2007) HMC901961. Reissued in 2013 HMA19511961
- Johannes Brahms, Trios Op. 8, 87, 101, Quartet Op. 25 with Christophe Gaugué (viola) 2CD (2006) HMC901915.16
- Dmitri Shostakovich, Aaron Copland, Trio Op. 8 & 67, Vitebsk, HMC981825
- Maurice Ravel, Ernest Chausson, Trio in A, Trio Op. 3 (1999, reissued in 2007) HMA19511967

==== By Sony Classical ====
- Bedřich Smetana, Antonín Dvořák, Trio Op.12, Trio Op. 90 "Dumky"
- Felix Mendelssohn, Trios Op. 49 & Op. 66

==== By Mirare ====
- Bruno Mantovani, Huit moments musicaux pour violon, violoncelle et piano / Five pieces for Paul Klee for cello and piano, with Claire Désert (piano) MIR159

==== By Universal-Accord ====
- Scènes d’enfants au crépuscule – Lettres mêlées. Recording dedicated to composer Thierry Escaich. Works by Claude Debussy, Bohuslav Martinů, Thierry Escaich and Bartók with François Leleux (oboe), Emmanuel Pahud (flute) and Paul Meyer (clarinet). Accord/Universal 480 1152 (2009)

==== By Capriccio ====
- Concertos by Martinů with the Gürzenich-Kölner Philharmoniker, under the direction of James Conlon.

==== By Cyprès record ====
- The pulse of an Irishman, Folksongs from the British isles, Ludwig van Beethoven, Haydn & Ignaz Pleyel with Wolfgang Holzmair, (baritone) (2008).

=== Within other ensembles ===
- With the octet Les Violoncelles français, Méditations (Label Mirare).
- With Emmanuel Strosser, Sonatas for Cello and Piano by Zoltán Kodály and Ernő Dohnányi (Label IntegralClassic).
- With Kay Ueyama (harpsichord), Pascale Jaupart (cello), Six sonatas for cello and bass dedicated to the King of Prussia by Jean-Pierre Duport (world premiere) (Label IntegralClassic).
- With François Kerdoncuff, Sonatas by Guy Ropartz (Label Timpani)

=== The "Le Maître et l'élève" series ===
- Johann Sebastian Bach, Suite No. 5 in C minor, BWV 1011 with Élodie Soulard (accordion) and Bruno Philippe (cello),
- Jacques Offenbach, Duo Lettre F 1st Suite in G minor for two cellos
- David Popper, Pieces of virtuosity: transcriptions for accordion by Yuri Shishkin (Label Intégral Classic & Festival 1001 notes, 2009).
