= Stéphan Aubé =

French musician

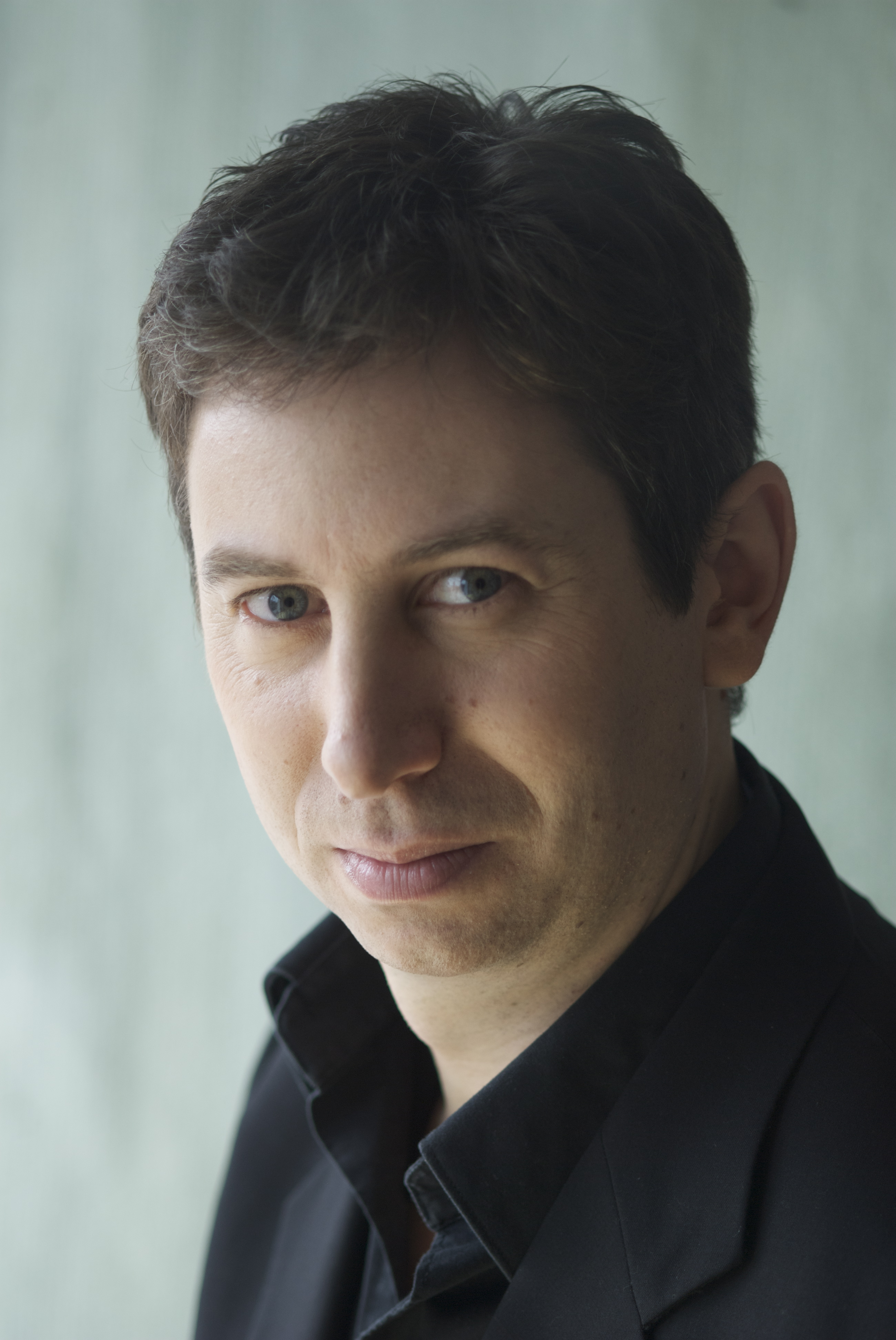
- Stéphan Aubé in 2011
- Born: Stéphan Aubé; 11 November 1971 (age 54); Poissy, France
- Occupations: Music video director, pianist
- Notable work: DVD Vingt Regards sur l'Enfant-Jésus, Digital Concert Hall, Jean-François Zygel TV' shows
- Website: http://www.stephanaube.com

Stéphan Aubé (born 11 November 1971) is a French Music video director for classical music and pianist.

== Biography ==
Stéphan Aubé started to study piano at the age of five.

He studied at the Conservatoire à Rayonnement Régional of Boulogne-Billancourt, where he won first prize in Geneviève Ibanez's class, then at the Conservatoire à Rayonnement Régional of Paris with Billy Eidi and Pierre Reach.

He also studied with Jacques Rouvier, Jean-Marc Luisada, Philippe Cassard, Géry Moutier, Pascal Devoyon, Georges Pludermacher, Jean-François Heisser and Maria Curcio and chamber music repertory with Paul Meyer and Éric Le Sage.

In parallel, he studied ballet from age 8 to 16 with teachers such as Michelle Perrot, Evelyne Wolff and Jacqueline Moreau (from Opéra de Paris) at the Conservatoire à Rayonnement Régional of Boulogne-Billancourt.

He holds a state diploma for vocal and instrumental accompaniment, and worked at Berlin University of the Arts (UdK) as pianist in Julie Kaufmann's opera singing class.

He also works as a vocal coach and takes part in numerous lyric and musical performances, appearing on many stages and festivals.

As a director, he worked for many French TV channels, including arte, France Télévisions, Mezzo TV, TV5 or for the Louisiana Museum of Modern Art (Denmark), the French label Abeille musique, the French sponsor Mécénat Musical Société Générale (for which he won several prices) and medici.tv, and for many labels, such as Universal Classics, Naïve Records, RCA Red Seal / Sony Music, and Outhere.

He works regularly for the Berlin Philharmonic Digital Concert Hall and for the Louisiana Museum of Modern Art in Denmark.

In 2013, he created the web platform Louisiana Music to present the musical clips he directed for the Louisiana Museum of Modern Art.

In 2014, France Télévisions asked him to direct a concert conducted by John Eliot Gardiner (Monteverdi's Vespers) at the Chapelle royale of Versailles, one of the first concerts filmed in multicameras live in 4K (UHD) and binaural sound.

Recently he directed a film on Bach's Goldberg Variations with pianist Alexandre Tharaud for Warner/Erato and arte for which he won the Echo Award (Germany) as Best DVD of the year 2016.

In 2023, Stéphan Aubé was awarded the Opus Klassik in Germany for making the film Suites for a suffering world with German cellist Tanja Tetzlaff. The film was shown in many cinemas in Germany and was a huge hit with the public.

In 2024, he is appointed as teacher of Audiovisual Analysis, Writing and Directing at the Conservatoire de Paris, where he will teach from September 2024.

From September 2026, he holds the position of director and head of the Video Department at the Conservatoire National Supérieur de Musique et de Danse de Paris.

Stéphan Aubé is the nephew of actor Jean-Claude Aubé and the son of actress Agnès Aubé.

== Works ==
=== TV shows ===
==== La leçon de musique de Jean-François Zygel ====
- Episode Wolfgang Amadeus Mozart with Paul Meyer and Quatuor Ébène
- Episode Franz Schubert with Nora Gubisch, Laurent Alvaro and quatuor Ébène

==== Les clefs de l'orchestre de Jean-François Zygel ====
- Episode Symphony 103 of Joseph Haydn with Ton Koopman
- Episode Boléro of Maurice Ravel with Kazushi Ono
- Episode Pastoral symphony of Ludwig van Beethoven with Paul Mc Creesch
- Episode New World Symphony of Anton Dvorak with Myung-Whun Chung

==== Others ====
- J.S. Bach : "Variations Goldberg" with Alexandre Tharaud (arte)
- Salon de musique opus 16 with Julie Fuchs, Julien Chauvin and the musicians of the Cercle de l'Harmonie (arte concert)
- A day in the life of Patricia Kopatchinskaja, video direction of the filming of the Berlin Philharmonie's concert

=== Berlin Philharmonic's Digital Concert Hall ===
- Tokyo Spring Festival - Chamber Music with Members of the Berlin Philharmonic Orchestra filmed at the Berlin Philharmonie with Daishin Kashimoto, Olaf Maninger and Ohad Ben-Ari (2021)
- Daniel Barenboim and Emmanuel Pahud, Concerto for flute by Jacques Ibert and Symphonie Fantastique by Hector Berlioz (2020)
- Beethoven Marathon with Albrecht Mayer and other musicians of the Berlin Philharmonic Orchestra (2020)
- Brett Dean Premiere of The Last Days of Socrates - Michael Tippett, A Child of Our Time conducted by Sir Simon Rattle (2013)
- Debussy, Messiaen, Tchaikovsky conducted by Christian Thielemann (2012)
- Debussy, Dvorak, Schoenberg and Elgar conducted by Sir Simon Rattle (2012)
- Piano Concerto No. 2 of Brahms - interpreted by Leif Ove Andsnes and conducted by Bernard Haitink (2011)
- Rachmaninov - Malher - conducted by Sir Simon Rattle (2010)
- Bach - Mozart - Haydn - interpreted and conducted by András Schiff (2010)
- Maurice Ravel's Piano Concerto in G major interpreted by Hélène Grimaud and conducted by Tugan Sokhiev (2010)
- Schoenberg - Brahms - conducted by Sir Simon Rattle (2009)
- Elijah of Felix Mendelssohn - conducted by Seiji Ozawa (2009)

=== Concerts ===
- Bayreuth Baroque 2026: 2 live concerts from the Margravial Opera House in Bayreuth featuring Bruno de Sá and Christophe Dumaux with Les Accents and the Wrocław Baroque Orchestra, conducted by Thibault Noally and Pedro Beriso – Bayerischer Rundfunk and Arte (2026)
- Gustav Mahler’s Symphony No. 1 "Titan," Orchestre de Paris conducted by Klaus Mäkelä
- Berlioz’s Grande messe des morts* with the Paris Opera Chorus and Orchestra conducted by Philippe Jordan – Philharmonie de Paris – POP (2026)
- Grieg’s Piano Concerto with Nobuyuki Tsujii and the Orchestre de Paris conducted by Klaus Mäkelä at the Philharmonie de Paris – Europiano arte (2026)
- Bayreuth Baroque 2025: 2 live concerts from the Margravial Opera House in Bayreuth featuring Julia Lezhneva, Franco Fagioli, and Marina Viotti, conducted by Stefan Plewniak and Andres Gabetta – arte / BR Klassik / Mezzo / Medici (2025)
- The Orchestre de l'Opéra national de Paris conducted by Tugan Sokhiev performs the 4th symphony by Dmitri Shostakovich at the Philharmonie de Paris - Pop (2024)
- Concert at the Pablo Casals Festival (Prades, France) with Daniel Lozakovich conducted by Pierre Bleuse - France Télévisions (2024)
- St Matthew Passion by Johann Sebastian Bach performed by the Banquet céleste conducted by Damien Guillon at the Opéra de Rennes (France Télévisions) filmed in UHD (2024)
- Patricia Kopatchinskaja and friends with the Ensemble Intercontemporain conducted by Pierre Bleuse, concert live from the Cité de la musique on arte concert (2023)
- Renaud Capuçon" interprets and conducts Mozart at La Grange au Lac, Evian (live concert on Stage+ from Deutsche Grammophon)
- Martha Argerich plays Beethoven under conducting of Renaud Capuçon with the Orchestre de Chambre de Lausanne
- Jakub Hrůša conducts Mozart and Bruckner — Bamberg Symphony Orchestra with Piotr Anderszewski, piano (2020)
- Perpetual Music Concert — With Sonya Yoncheva, Michael Volle, Avi Avital live from Staatsoper Berlin, Germany (2020)
- Louis XIV’s Coronation at the Royal Chapel of Château de Versailles, Ensemble Correspondances under the direction of Sébastien Daucé - Filmed in Ultra High Definition (2019)
- Tribute to the 150th anniversary of the death of Hector Berlioz at the Opéra Royal of Château de Versailles under the direction of Sir John Eliot Gardiner and filmed in Ultra High Definition (2018)
- Charpentier Te Deum at St John's Co-Cathedral, Malta - Ensemble Correspondances under conducting of Sébastien Daucé and filmed in Ultra High Definition - France 2 (broadcast live on Culture Box) (2017)
- J.S. Bach : "Variations Goldberg" with Alexandre Tharaud - Arte - Echo Award for Best DVD of the Year 2016 (2016)
- 100 years commemoration of armenian genocide, concert under conducting of Alain Altinoglu at the Théâtre du Châtelet, Paris. - France Télévisions, live (2015)
- Concert of Sergey Khachatryan and the Orchestre de Paris conducted by Gianandrea Noseda at the Salle Pleyel - arte, live (2014)
- Les Légendes d'Arménie conducted by Alain Altinoglu at the Opéra Comique of Paris - France Télévisions, live (2014)
- Vêpres solennelles de la Vierge from Claudio Monteverdi with the Monteverdi Choir and The English Baroque Soloists under the conducting of John Eliot Gardiner. Filmed in Ultra High Definition Live France Télévisions (2014)
- The night of Fantomas in live from the Theatre du Chatelet, Paris. 5 Films (1913) from the French director Louis Feuillade remastered by Gaumont with musical accompaniment under the musical direction of Yann Tiersen for arte live web and ZDF (2013)
- Les Salons de musique with Julie Fuchs and the musicians of the Cercle de l'harmonie in live on Arte Live Web (2013)
- Tamara Stefanovich, Thomas Bloch and the Junge Philharmonie Orchestra from Berlin conducted by Kristjan Järvi (live on the Digital Concert Hall)
- Patricia Kopatchinskaja and the Staatskapelle of Berlin conducted by Pablo Heras-Casado - Berlin Philharmonic Concert Hall - For a film by Claus Wischmann - arte (2013)
- Alice Sara Ott plays the concerto en sol by Ravel with the Munich Philharmonic conducted by Lorin Maazel - arte (2012)
- Nils Frahm in concert at the Louisiana Museum of Modern Art (Denmark) for the Louisiana Channel (2012)
- Francesco Tristano Schlimé in concert at La scène Bastille, Paris - live for the website of abeillemusique.com (2006)
- Concerts at the Louisiana Museum of Modern Art, Denmark (2007–2010)
- Musique à l'Empéri Festival with Emmanuel Pahud, Paul Meyer and Eric Le Sage - Several seasons

=== Operas ===
- La Finta Giardiniera by Wolfgang Amadeus Mozart with the Académie de l'Opéra de Paris, staged by Julie Delille - POP (2026)

Isola disabitata by Joseph Haydn at the Amphithéâtre de l'Opéra de Paris, staged by Simon Valastro - POP (2025)

- Carmen by Georges Bizet at the Opéra Royal de Versailles for the 150th anniversary of the work’s creation, featuring period sets and costumes, in a production staged by Romain Gilbert - Château de Versailles Spectacles - France Télévisions (2025)
- L'annonce faite à Marie by Philippe Leroux from a play of Paul Claudel, staged by Célie Pauthe - coproduction IRCAM (2023)
- The Tales of Hoffmann by Jacques Offenbach at the Opéra de Monte-Carlo with Juan Diego Flórez under the conducting of Jacques Lacombe - Staged by Jean-Louis Grinda - France 2, live on Culture Box (2018)
- Philémon et Baucis de Charles Gounod au Grand Théâtre de Tours staged by Julien Ostini under the conducting of Benjamin Pionnier - France 3 (2018)
- Tannhäuser by Richard Wagner at the Opéra de Monte-Carlo with José Cura under the conducting of Nathalie Stutzmann - staged by Jean-Louis Grinda - France 3, live on Culture Box (2017)
- Atys en folie parody of Atys by Lully for singers and puppeteers at the Teatru Manoel, Malta - Staged by Jean-Philippe Desrousseaux and produced by the Centre de musique baroque de Versailles (2017)
- Don Giovanni of Mozart at the Opéra de Monte-Carlo with Erwin Schrott staged by Jean-Louis Grinda - France 3, live on Culture Box (2015)
- Alcina of Haendel at La Monnaie, Brussels (Belgium) with Sandrine Piau staged by Pierre Audi under the conducting of Christophe Rousset - France 3, live on Mezzo Live HD (2015)
- Ernani of Verdi at the Opéra de Monte-Carlo with Ludovic Tézier staged by Jean-Louis Grinda - France 3 (2014)
- Idomeneo of Mozart at the Theater an der Wien, Vienna (Austria) with Richard Croft staged by Damiano Michieletto under the conducting of René Jacobs - live on Mezzo Live HD (2013)
- Medea by Guillaume Connesson at the Opéra de Vichy with Alexia Cousin staged by Jean-Claude Amyl (2005)

=== DVD ===
==== La leçon de musique de Jean-François Zygel ====
- Episode Mozart
- Episode Schubert

==== Les clefs de l'orchestre de Jean-François Zygel ====
- Episode Symphony 103 of Joseph Haydn
- Episode Boléro of Ravel
- Episode Pastoral symphony of Beethoven
- Episode New World Symphony of Anton Dvorak

==== Other DVD ====
- Tribute concert for the 150 years of death of Hector Berlioz under conducting of Sir John Eliot Gardiner (DVD and Blu-ray) released by Chateau de Versailles Spectacles
- Ernani by Verdi staged by Jean-Louis Grinda - With Ramon Vargas, Ludovic Tézier, Alexander Vinogradov and Svetla Vassileva released by ArtHaus Musik
- Alcina by Haendel staged by Pierre Audi - With Sandrine Piau and Les Talents Lyriques under conducting of Christophe Rousset released by Alpha Classics (Outhere)
- Vespro della beata vergine by Monteverdi under conducting of John Eliot Gardiner (DVD and Blu-ray) - released by Alpha Classics (outhere)
- Bach Goldberg Variations with the pianist Alexandre Tharaud - Warner Music / Erato
- Turangalîla-Symphonie by Olivier Messiaen interpreted by the Berlin Junge Philharmonie Orchestra under the conducting of Kristjan Järvi
- Chamber music of the French composer Guillaume Connesson - Collection Pierre Bergé
- Works by the great romantics with Daishin Kashimoto, Éric Le Sage, Paul Meyer, François Salque and Jing Zhao - Louisiana Museum of Modern Art
- Frescobaldi Dialogues performed by Francesco Schlime - Abeille musique
- Joseph Kosma, chansons - Zig-Zag Territoires
- Vingt regards sur l'enfant-Jésus by Olivier Messiaen performed by Roger Muraro - Accor / Universal Music Classic
- Techno Parade Chamber music of Guillaume Connesson - RCA Red Seal / Sony Music
- Iannis Xenakis, Autour de la percussion with Pedro Carneiro - Zig-Zag Territoires
- Intégrale des sonates pour piano of Scriabine - Mécénat Musical Société Générale
- La musique, une passion, un partage - Mécénat Musical Société Générale

=== Documentaries ===
- Suites for a Suffering World with Tanja Tetzlaff (NHK, 3SAT, Mezzo) - Opus Klassik 2023, Germany
- Lorin Maazel meets Alice Sara Ott, 2013 (arte / ZDF)
- Joseph Kosma, autour de l'enregistrement, 2006 (Mezzo)
- Roger Muraro : Un regard sur Olivier Messiaen, 2005 (Mezzo)
- Autour de la percussion de Iannis Xenakis, 2004 (Mezzo)
- Entretien avec Guillaume Connesson
- La musique, une passion, un partage, 2003 (for the 20th anniversary of the Société Générale Foundation)
- Musique à l'Empéri, un vent de liberté, 1999 (Mezzo)

Films produced by Fondation Société Générale (formerly Mécénat Musical Société Générale) :

- Capt'Actions of Ivan Fedele in Théâtre Mogador, Paris
- Enregistrement du Clavier bien tempéré de Johann Sebastian Bach interpreted by Andreï Vieru
- Enregistrement des Sept dernières paroles du Christ en croix de Joseph Haydn - Ensemble Accentus - Laurence Equilbey
- Festival Printemps des Arts de Monte-Carlo
- Concours Avant-scènes à Radio France
- Quatuor Ardeo en concert Déclic à Radio France
- Enregistrement des Sonates de Johannes Brahms interpreted by Lise Berthaud
- 25 ans du Conservatoire National Supérieur de Musique et Danse de Lyon
- La Chambre Philharmonique et Emmanuel Krivine en concert in Cité de la Musique, Paris
- Musiques des cours ottomane et européennes by Chimène Seymen in Institut du Monde Arabe
- Festival & Rencontres de musique de chambre du Larzac
- Musique entre deux temps, les Percussions de Strasbourg
- Théâtre des Bouffes du nord, un autre visage
- Festival Aspect des musiques d'aujourd'hui / Caen, "Made in Hungaria"
- Les Enfants en scène, l'opéra s'invite à l'école
- Concours International de piano d'Orléans / Concert de prestige 2009
- Enregistrement du Quintette à deux violoncelles de Schubert with Alain Meunier and the quatuor Psophos

==== Webdocumentaries ====
- Iphigénie à l'Opéra : On vous dit tout - 15 films Series - Produced by Angers-Nantes Opéra (2020)
- A series of short films for the Lucerne Piano Festival with Martha Argerich, Mischa Maisky, Thomas Hampson, Víkingur Ólafsson... (2023)
- Series of portraits of conductor Pierre Bleuse and the Odense Symphony Orchestra (2024)

=== Louisiana Museum of Modern Art ===
==== Boris Giltburg Five Minute Music Library Series ====
- Beethoven - The Contra E
- Beethoven - Boogie-Woogie
- Grieg - Nature and Emotion
- Liszt - The Motifs
- Mussorgsky - The Promenades
- Piano Technique in 4 minutes
- Rachmaninov - The Return
- Rachmaninov - The Riding Hood
- Rachmaninov - Variation 18
- Schumann - Arabesque
- Schumann - Eusebius and Florestan
- Schumann - The Sphinxes
- Tchaikovsky - Piano Concerto
- Tchaikovsky - Double Octaves
- The Chromatic Scale
- The Thirds (in two parts)

==== Série Boris Giltburg Explained ====
- Are Études necessary?
- What is a Sonata?
- How many keys are there on a piano?
- Who was Elise (en deux parties)
- Why do you wear a tailcoat?
- Playing by heart
- What is a prelude?
- Pedals (en deux parties)
- Clapping
- Black & white keys

==== Musical Clips ====
- 4 videoclips with Emmanuel Pahud : Bach, Allegro from Sonata in A minor - Debussy, Syrinx - Ferroud, Jade from Trois pieces for solo flute - Tchaikovsky, Lensky's Aria from Eugene Onegin
- Core and Tide with the Danish cellist Josefine Opsahl
- Mirages and Winter Sun with Palle Mikkelborg, Michael Riessler and Wayne Siegel
- Presto from Quartet No. 7 in D major by Franz Schubert with the Modigliani Quartet
- Mussorgsky - Baba Yaga performed by Andreas Haefliger, extract from Pictures at an Exhibition
- Mussorgsky - Chicks performed by Andreas Haefliger, extract from Pictures at an Exhibition
- Hindemith - Sonata for viola with Lise Berthaud
- Paganini - Caprice 5 and 24 with Sergey Malov
- Chamber Music of Guillaume Connesson (Chants de l'Agartha, Chants de l'Atlantide, Constellations) with Jérôme Pernoo, Jérôme Ducros...
- Christian Poltéra - Bach, Suite n°1, Sarabande
- Karen Gomyo and Christian Poltéra - Honegger, Sonatine for violin and cello
- Karen Gomyo - Piazzola, Tango-Étude for violin
- Sergey Malov - Bach, Invention 1 - Sinfonia 6
- Denis Kozhukhin - Prokofiev, Precipitato (3rd movement from 7th Sonata for piano) - First Prize at the 3rd Festival Pasqua de Cervera (Spain)
- Boris Giltburg - Rachmaninov, Prelude op. 23 N°7 - 4014 awarded as Best Music Video of American festival Directors Circle Festival of Shorts
- Palle Mikkelborg - Capricorne
- Pyramid with Palle Mikkelborg, Michael Riessler and Wayne Siegel
- Octet by Felix Mendelssohn with Sergey Malov

==== Concerts ====
- Brahms - Trio with clarinet, cello and piano with Paul Meyer, Jing Zhao and Eric Le Sage
- Brahms - Trio with horn, violin and piano with Bruno Schneider, Daishin Kashimoto and Eric Le Sage
- Fauré - Quartet with piano with Daishin Kashimoto, Lise Berthaud, François Salque and Eric Le Sage
- Franck - Quintet with piano with Guy Braunstein, Daishin Kashimoto, Lise Berthaud, François Salque and Eric Le Sage
- Haendel - Passacaille with Daishin Kashimoto and Jing Zhao
- Schumann - Quartet with piano with Daishin Kashimoto, Lise Berthaud, François Salque and Eric Le Sage
- Schumann - Quintet with piano with Guy Braunstein, Daishin Kashimoto, Lise Berthaud, François Salque and Eric Le Sage
- Weber - Grand Duo Concertant with Paul Meyer and Eric Le Sage

=== Musical clips for several labels ===
- 4 clips from the recording of Bach's Mass in B by René Jacobs, the Akademie für Alte Musik Berlin and the RIAS Kammerchor for Harmonia Mundi
- Chamber Music of Francis Poulenc with Paul Meyer, Eric Le Sage, François Salque...
- Chamber Music of Guillaume Connesson (Techno Parade, initial dances, Sextuor, Chants de l'Agartha, Chants de l'Atlantide, Constellations) with Eric Le Sage, Paul Meyer, Jérôme Pernoo, Jérôme Ducros... Published by BMG/Sony and Collection Pierre Bergé
- Leonard Bernstein - Orchestre Lamoureux conducted by Yutaka Sado (West Side Story, On the Town, Wonderful Town...)
- Erik Satie - Orchestre Lamoureux conducted by Yutaka Sado
- Chansons of Joseph Kosma - Published by Zig-Zag Territoires
- Rebonds B de Iannis Xenakis - Published by Zig-Zag Territoires
- Bach Panther of Stéphane Delplace

=== short films ===
- 1990 Solo music by Hugues Le Bars
- 1991 Le visiteur (The Visitor), Super 8 animated film
- 1992 Sens interdits (Forbidden Senses)
- 1993 Des nouvelles de Zanzibar (News from Zanzibar) music by Olivier Daviaud
- 1994 L’ail des ours (Wild garlic) with Agnès Aubé
- 2001 En Direct de l'Histoire (Live from History), series with Catherine Lefroid and Richard Delestre

== Achievements ==
- 2023: Opus Klassik Innovation Prize for Sustainability for Suites for a suffering world
- 2023: the film Suites for a suffering world is nominated for the Golden Prague, the 33rd Vienna Film Festival and the 12th Deauville Green Awards in official competition
- 2016: Echo Award for the best DVD of the year 2016 Bach - Goldberg Variations with Alexandre Tharaud (2016)
- 2016: Diapason d'Or and Choc de Classica for the DVD Vespro della Beata Vergine by Monteverdy under conducting of John Eliot Gardiner
- 2015: Best Music Video in American festival Directors Circle Festival of Shorts for the film 4014
- 2013: First Prize for the music clip Precipitato starring the pianist Denis Kozhukhin at the 3rd 3rd Festival Pasqua de Cervera, Spain
- 2011: Choc Classica for the DVD Musique de chambre by Guillaume Connesson
- 2006: Choc de Classica for Jean-François Zygel's DVD (Haydn, Boléro and Schubert)
- 2005: Choc du Monde de la Musique and Choc de Classica for the DVD Vingt Regards sur l'Enfant-Jésus by Olivier Messiaen with Roger Muraro
- 2005: Diapason d'Or, Choc du Monde de la Musique and 10 de répertoire Classica for the DVD Techno Parade by Guillaume Connesson
- 2004: Top Com d'Or of Paris for the documentary Music: A Passion, a Shared Experience
- 2003: Prix Frères Lumière in Festival international des médias audiovisuels corporate du Creusot for the film and DVD of the 20 years anniversary of Société Générale Foundation
- 2000: Dauphin de Bronze in Festival Comunica de Deauville for 2 films of internal communication of Société Générale Foundation (2000)
