= Guillaume Connesson =

French composer (born 1970)

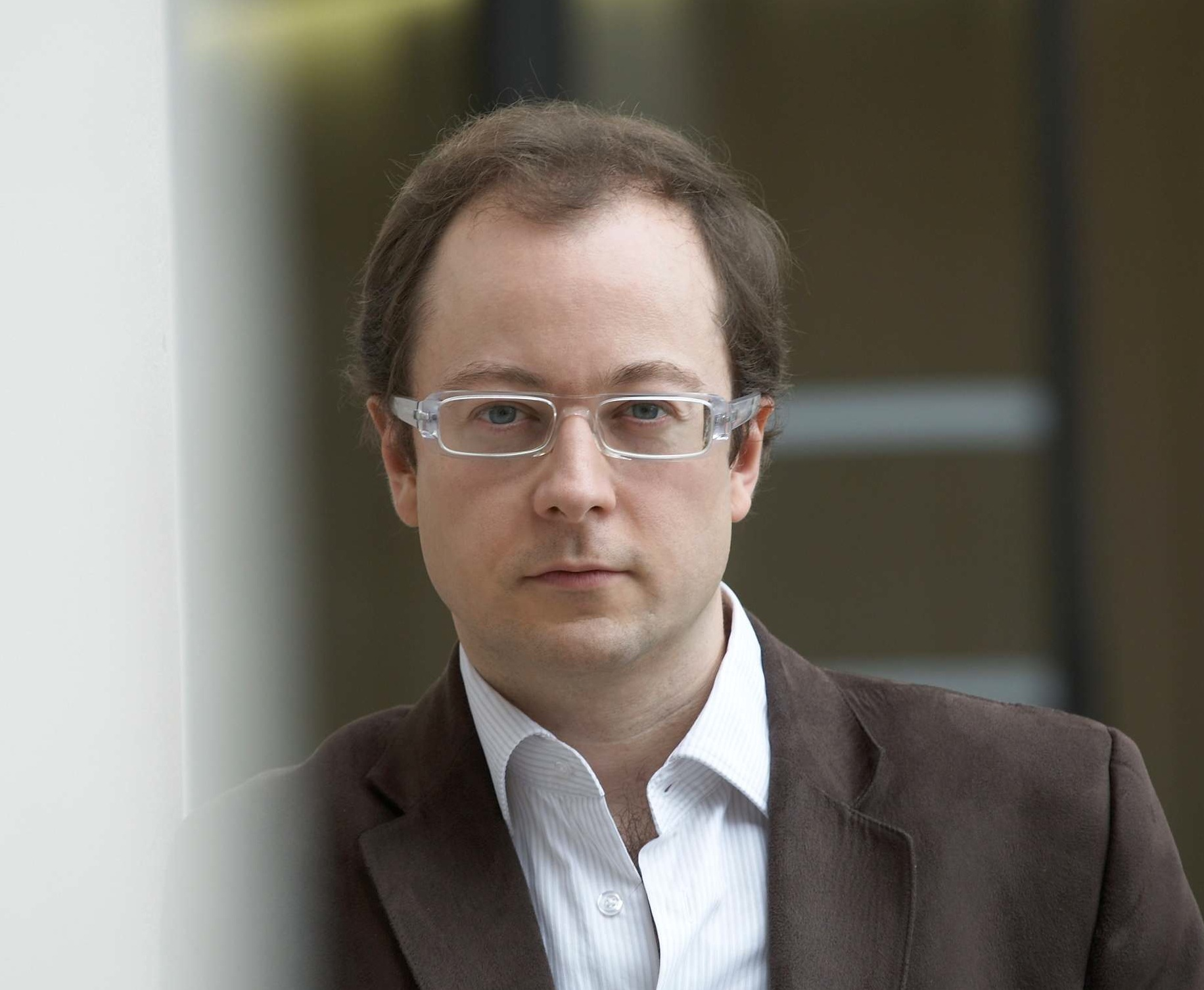
- Guillaume Connesson

Background information
- Born: 5 May 1970 (age 55)
- Origin: Boulogne-Billancourt, France
- Occupation: Composer

Guillaume Connesson (French: [gijom kɔnɛsɔ̃]) is a French composer born in 1970 in Boulogne-Billancourt.

== Biography ==
Connesson studied the piano, music theory, music history and choir conducting at the Conservatoire National de Région de Boulogne-Billancourt and composition with Marcel Landowski for six years from 1989.

In the Conservatoire National de Région de Paris, he studied orchestral conducting with Dominique Rouits and orchestration with Alain Louvier.

As a composer, he asserts influences as various as François Couperin, Richard Wagner, Richard Strauss, Claude Debussy, Maurice Ravel, Igor Stravinsky, Olivier Messiaen for the Turangalîla-Symphonie and Saint François d'Assise, Henri Dutilleux for his Métaboles, Steve Reich, and also John Adams but also movie composers such as Bernard Herrmann or John Williams or the funk style of James Brown.

From 2001 to 2003, he was composer in residence at the Orchestre National des Pays de la Loire, for which he wrote the vocal symphony Liturgies de l'ombre and the symphonic poem L'appel au feu.

He is currently composer in association with the Royal Scottish National Orchestra; his music is played by American and English orchestras such as the Cincinnati Symphony Orchestra, the Philadelphia Orchestra, the Houston Symphony Orchestra, the Saint Louis Symphony Orchestra, and the BBC Symphony Orchestra. From 2009 he has been composer in residence at the Orchestre de Pau, Pays de Béarn.

Connesson teaches orchestration at the Conservatoire National d'Aubervilliers-la Courneuve.

Guillaume Connesson's music is published by Éditions Billaudot.

== Works ==
=== Orchestral ===
- Oniris (1991)
- Night-Club (1996)
- Feux d'artifice (1998)
- Enluminures (1999)
- Scènes Nocturnes for string orchestra (2001)
- Trilogie cosmique

1. Supernova (1997)
2. Une lueur dans l'âge sombre (2005)
3. Aleph (2007)

- The Ship of Ishtar for string orchestra (2009)
- Lucifer - Ballet in two acts with a libretto by the composer (2011)
- Maslenitsa (2011)
- Flammenschrift (2012)
- Les cites de Lovecraft - orchestral poems (2017)

=== Concertante ===
- Yu Yan for erhu and orchestra (2007)
- Concerto for cello and orchestra (2008)
- Constellations, Concerto for viola and orchestra (2009)
- The Shining One, Concerto for piano and orchestra (2009)
- Concertino for piano and chamber orchestra (2013)
- Pour sortir au jour- Concerto for flute and orchestra (2014)
- A Kind of Trane - Concerto for saxophone (soprano and alto) and orchestra (2015)
- Les Horizons Perdus - Concerto for violin and orchestra (2018)
- Les Belles Heures - Concerto for oboe and orchestra (2022)
- Danses concertantes - Concerto for flute and orchestra

=== Vocal ===
==== Music for choir and orchestra ====
- Sphaera for chorus and orchestra (2006), or for chorus, piano 4 hands and percussion (chamber version) (2010); Latin text by Richard Crashaw
- La cathédrale aux étoiles, Cantata in 3 acts for mixed chorus, children chorus and orchestra (2006); text of Valérie de la Rochefoucauld
- Athanor for soprano, baritone, mixed chorus and ensemble or orchestra (2003)

==== Music for choir and instruments ====
- Sphaera for choir, piano with 4 hands and 3 percussions (chamber version) - On a Latin text of Richard Crashaw (2010)
- Musique pour Oscar - Seven children choirs a cappella or with instrumental accompaniment harp and cello (2007)
- Au commencement, for children's chorus and instrumental ensemble (2004)

==== Music for a cappella choir ====
- Funeratio for mixed chorus a cappella, or with instrumental ensemble (2011)
- Deux chœurs for female chorus a cappella (2005); poems of Olivier Tanguy
- Laudate Pueri for mixed chorus a cappella (2002)

==== Music for solo voice and orchestra ====
- Liturgies de l'ombre for soprano and orchestra (2000); poem of Charles Péguy
- Le Livre de l'amour for mezzo-soprano and orchestra (2001); poems of Lord Byron, Emily Brontë and Germain Nouveau

==== Music for solo voice and chamber ensemble ====
- Medea for soprano, clarinet, cello and piano (2004); text by Jean Vauthier
- Timouk, Musical Tale for narrator and five instruments on a booklet of Yun Sun Limet (2010)

==== Music for solo voice and piano ====
- De l'Espérance for soprano and piano (1999); poem of Charles Péguy
- Nuit obscure for baritone and piano (2000); poem of Saint-Jean de la Croix
- I'll not weep for alto and piano (2001); poem of Emily Brontë
- My sweet sister for mezzo-soprano and piano (2001); poem of Lord Byron
- Trois merveilles du monde for baritone and piano (2008); poems of Victor Hugo
- Vivre for soprano and piano (2010); poem of Typhanie Vigouroux

=== Chamber and instrumental music ===
- Disco-toccata for clarinet and cello (1994)
- Double Quatuor for flute, oboe, clarinet, bass clarinet and string quartet (1994)
- Deux Images antiques for clarinet, bassoon, trumpet, trombone, percussion, violin and double bass (1996)
- Jurassic Trip for flute, clarinet, 2 pianos, percussion and string quintet (1998)
- Sextuor for oboe, clarinet, violin, viola, double bass and piano (1998)
- initials dances for piano solo (2001)
- Le rire de Saraï for flute and piano (2001)
- Techno-parade for flute, clarinet and piano (2002)
- Toccata nocturne for flute and cello (2002)
- Toccata for harp solo (2003)
- Riffs for trumpet solo (2004)
- La Solitaire for viola da gamba solo (2004)
- Constellation de la Couronne boréale for viola and piano (2005)
- L'île de Pâques, Prélude for piano (2006)
- Les Chants de l'Atlantide, 3 Pieces for violin and piano (2007)
- Constellation de la Couronne australe for viola and piano (2008)
- Les Chants de l'Agartha, 3 Pieces for cello and piano (2008)
- String Quartet (2010)

=== Teaching music ===
- Remix for strings orchestra and six percussionists (1998)
- Et un sourire for children's chorus and string orchestra (1998); poem of Paul Éluard

=== Stage music ===
- Musique pour Oscar, Incidental Music for the play Oscar et la dame rose by Éric-Emmanuel Schmitt for children's choir, harp and cello (2007)
- Lucifer, Ballet in 2 acts (2011); libretto by the composer

=== Film scores ===
- Greed, Music for Erich von Stroheim's 1924 film for clarinet, violin, viola, cello and piano (1995)
- L'Aurore, Music for Friedrich Wilhelm Murnau's 1927 silent film Sunrise: A Song of Two Humans for large symphonic orchestra (1999)

== Discography ==
- Lost Horizon - Les Cités de Lovecraft, A Kind of Trane (concerto for saxophone), Les Horizons Perdus (concerto for violin), Le Tombeau des Regrets - Renaud Capuçon, Timothy McAllister. Brussels Philharmonic conducted by Stéphane Denève (Deutsche Grammophon, avril 2019)
- Pour sortir au jour- Flammenschrift - Pour sortir au jour, concerto for flute - E chiaro nella valle il fiume appare - Maslenitsa. With the Brussels Philharmonic conducted by Stéphane Denève, with Mathieu Dufour, flute (Deutsche Grammophon, 2016). Award: Diapason d'or (September 2016).
- Lucifer - Concerto for cello interpreted by Jérôme Pernoo - Lucifer (ballet) - Orchestre Philharmonique de Monte-Carlo under conducting of Jean-Christophe Spinosi (Deutsche Grammophon)
- Timouk (CD + Book) - Yun Sun Limet, texts - Delphine Jacquot, illustrations - Claire-Marie Le Guay, piano - Marie Gillain, narrator (Didier Jeunesse)
- Constellations (CD + DVD directed by Stéphan Aubé) - Monograph of chamber music - With Jérôme Ducros, Jérôme Pernoo... (Editions Pierre Bergé)
- Cosmic Trilogy - The Shining One - With Éric Le Sage, Stéphane Denève and the Royal Scottish National Orchestra (Chandos)
- Athanor-Supernova - Monograph of orchestral music and choral (Densité 21)
- Laudate pueri - Motet for mixed chorus with six voices a cappella (Accord)
- Techno Parade (CD + DVD directed by Stéphan Aubé) - Monograph of chamber music - With Mathieu Dufour, Paul Meyer, Éric Le Sage... (BMG - RCA)

== Interpreters ==
Principal musicians or orchestral formations which interpret regularly the music of Guillaume Connesson:

- Lise Berthaud, viola
- Stéphane Denève, conductor
- Jérome Ducros, piano
- Fayçal Karoui, conductor
- Florent Héau, clarinet
- Claire-Marie Le Guay, piano
- Eric Le Sage, piano
- Paul Meyer, clarinet
- Jérôme Pernoo, cello
- Jean-Yves Thibaudet, piano
- Philadelphia Orchestra
- BBC Symphony Orchestra
- National Symphony Orchestra
- Cincinnati Symphony Orchestra
- Houston Symphony Orchestra...

== Awards and distinctions ==
- 2011 - Grand Prix SACEM de la musique symphonique (carrière)
- 2006 - Grand Prix Lycéen des Compositeurs
- 2005 - Choc du Monde de la Musique and 10 de Classica for the CD Techno Parade
- 2001 - Bourse de la Fondation Natexis
- 2000 - Prix de la SACEM
- 1999 - Prix Nadia et Lili Boulanger
- 1998 - Prix Cardin de l'Institut de France pour Supernova
