= Stéphane Delplace =

- Born: 11 November 1953 (age 72)
- Origin: Bordeaux, France
- Occupations: Composer, teacher, pianist

Stéphane Delplace (born 11 November 1953) is a French composer.

== Biography ==
Delplace was born in Bordeaux. He studied piano under Pierre Sancan, as well as Harmony (Alain Bernaud), Counterpoint (Jean-Paul Holstein), Fugue (Michel Merlet), and Orchestration (Serge Nigg) at the Conservatoire de Paris, from 1979 to 1984, in addition to studying the Organ with Jean Galard through the Ville de Paris.

Delplace began to compose in the mid-1980s, with a firm conviction, though unpopular at the time, that tonal music still hides infinite unexplored territories.

His music finds its roots in that of Bach, Brahms, Fauré, Ravel, and Prokofiev.

This determination to write tonal music has naturally kept him far from official contemporary music circles. In 2000, he joined the Phoenix Group founded by Jean-François Zygel and Thierry Escaich, in order to propose an alternative to institutionalized contemporary music.

Having explored many different types of ensembles, from orchestra to choir, from chamber music to the organ, he dedicates a large part of his opus to the piano, often played by many prestigious performers.

From 2008, he began to perform his own works in concert. His works are played mostly in France, but also in Germany, Italy, Greece, Turkey, China, and the United States.

In 2001, the Académie des Beaux-Arts awarded Delplace the Prix Florent Schmitt.

Delplace teaches Composition, Counterpoint and Harmony at the Paris Conservatories of the 6th and 17th districts, as well as at École normale de musique de Paris.

Stephane Delplace's works are edited through: Editions Durand, Eschig, Billaudot and Delatour.

== Works ==
=== Piano ===
- Bach Panther (1985)
- Variations dans le Ton de Ré (1991)
- Chacone (1993)
- Préludes & Fugues dans les Trente Tonalités - Book I (1994)
- Quatorze Klavierstücke (1994-1999)
- Marche antique (1997)
- Pièces blanches - 12 pieces in C major (2000)
- Marche Funèbre (2000)
- Passacaille (2001)
- Konzerstück (2002)
- Fugue selon fugue (2006)
- Irrévérences (2006)
- Préludes & Fugues dans les Trente Tonalités - Book II (2008)
- Chronogénèse (2009)
- Six Etudes pour piano (2010)
- Little Italy (2011)

=== Transcriptions for piano ===
- Ante Chacona - Bach, 2nd Partita for violon solo (2000)
- 1ère Partita pour violon seul - Bach (2008)
- Partita pour flûte seule - Bach (2008)

=== Concertante ===
- Adagio pour violon et orchestre à cordes (1995)
- Laus Vitæ - Symphonie concertante pour alto et violon (1998)
- Concerto pour piano n°1 (2003)
- Concerto pour piano n°2 (2005)
- Concerto à la Manière Italienne (2011)

=== Chamber music ===
- Variations dans le ton de sol for cello solo (1992)
- Quintette à deux violoncelles (2007)
- Sextet for winds, strings and piano (2008)

=== Choir and organ ===
- De Sibilla (1985)
- Odi et Amo (1996)

=== Orchestre ===
- Concert pour cordes (1995)
- Le Tombeau de Ravel (1997)
- Symphonie pour cordes - Transcription of Sextet (2008)

=== Organ ===
- Fantaisie en sol mineur (1990)
- Chacone (1993)
- Fantaisie et Fugue sur BACH - PINCEMAILLE (2007)
- Grave
- Sonate en Trio
- Fugue en ré mineur
- Non-Toccata & Fugue en fa
- Pastorale en fa (2011)

=== Oratorio ===
- Le Plafond de la Chapelle Sixtine (2012)

== Discography ==
- Variations dans le ton de sol interpreted by Emmanuel Boulanger, cello - Skarbo (2005)
- Quatorze Klavierstücke interpreted by Jean-Louis Caillard, piano - Saphir productions (2006)
- Trois Intermezzi (extract from Klavierstücke) interpreted by Marie-Louise Nezeys, piano
- Fantaisie en sol mineur and Bach Panther interpreted by Jean-François Frémont, organ - Disque Tamos (Jean-Claude Quint)

== Leading performers ==
=== Musicians ===
- Emmanuel Boulanger
- Jean-Louis Caillard
- Claudio Chaiquin
- Bertrand Chamayou
- Giancarlo Crespeau
- Denis Comtet
- Henri Demarquette
- Frédéric Denis
- Jean Dubé
- Jérôme Ducros
- Jean Galard
- Yves Henry
- Nicolas Horvath
- Sergei Malov
- Michel Michalakakos
- Jérôme Pernoo
- Pierre Pincemaille
- Grégoire Rolland
- Arnaud Thorette
- Pierre-Alain Volondat
- Jean-François Zygel

=== Conductor ===
- Marc Korovitch
- Jean-François Frémont
- Adrian McDonnell
- Deyan Pavlov
- Laurent Petitgirard
- François-Xavier Roth
- Marc Trautmann
- Adam Vidovic

=== Ensembles ===
- Palomar Ensemble (Chicago)
- Ensemble Millésime
- Quatuor Ebène
- Quatuor Modigliani
- Orchestre Philharmonique de Monte Carlo
- Orchestre de la Radio de Sofia
- Orchestre de la Cité Internationale
- Orchestre du Conservatoire de Luxembourg

== Others ==
In 2008, Stéphan Aubé directed a video clip of the Bach Panther fugue and an interview with Stéphane Delplace.
