= Festival du Bruit qui Pense =

The Festival du Bruit qui Pense (Festival of the Noise that Thinks) is an international classical music festival located in the Yvelines, France. It was founded in 2016 by pianist Ingmar Lazar, who is also its artistic director.

The name of the festival is inspired from a quote by Victor Hugo: "music is noise that thinks".

The Festival is since 2019 located in the city of Louveciennes, and takes place every year in March. The first edition of the festival was inaugurated in the town of Les Mesnuls, and in 2017 and 2018 was in residence at the Musée national de Port-Royal des Champs at Magny-les-Hameaux.

The characteristic of the Festival du Bruit qui Pense is that it gives the possibility of creating a direct dialogue between artists and the audience with interactive post-concert interviews, led by moderators who also introduce the concerts.

Well-known artists appeared at the Festival, including Stéphanie Argerich, Brigitte Fossey, Pierre Génisson, Giuseppe Gibboni, David Kadouch, Andrei Korobeinikov, Stephen Kovacevich, Danielle Laval, Jean-Claude Pennetier, Patrick Poivre d'Arvor, Jacques Rouvier, Roustem Saitkoulov, Christoph Seybold, François Salque, the Szymanowski Quartet, Éric Tanguy, Igor Tchetuev, and the Trio Wanderer.
