= Ingmar Lazar =

French classical pianist

Ingmar Lazar (born June 22, 1993 in Saint-Cloud) is a French classical pianist.

Lazar started to play the piano when he was five. He made his debut at the age of six at the Salle Gaveau.

Prizewinner of several international competitions, he was awarded the Tabor Foundation Piano Award at the Verbier Festival, Switzerland in 2013. Ingmar Lazar is a Steinway Artist.

He has been invited to give concerts all over Europe, in Asia and in the United States in prestigious halls such as the Great Hall of the Tchaikovsky Conservatory and the International Performing Arts Centre in Moscow, Charles Bronfman Auditorium in Tel Aviv, Concertgebouw in Amsterdam, Salle Cortot in Paris, Herkulessaal in Munich, International Mozarteum Foundation in Salzburg, Verdi Hall of the Milan Conservatory, Rudolfinum in Prague, Romanian Athenaeum, Slovenian Philharmonic Hall of Ljubljana, as well as in many festivals (Festspiele Mecklenburg-Vorpommern, European Weeks Festival in Passau, Festival de La Roque-d'Anthéron, International Colmar Festival, Festival Radio France Occitanie Montpellier, Festival Chopin in Paris, Festival Les Piano Folies in Le Touquet, Festival 1001 Notes in the Limousin, Summer Music Festival of the Château de Lourmarin, Estate Regina Music Festival in Montecatini Terme, International Music Festival of Póvoa de Varzim, Sant Pere de Rodes Music Festival, Gotthard Klassik-Festival Andermatt).

He has been performing with conductors Julien Chauvin, Mykola Diadiura, Anna Duczmal-Mróz, Constantin Adrian Grigore, Mathieu Herzog, Jean-Jacques Kantorow, Nicolas Krauze, Vladimir Spivakov, Peter Vizard, and with orchestras such as the National Philharmonic of Russia, the Moscow Virtuosi, the Orchestre Pasdeloup, the Orchestre Lamoureux, Le Concert de la Loge, the Toruń Symphony Orchestra, the Romanian Radio Chamber Orchestra, the Academic Symphony Orchestra of the Lviv Philharmonic.

As a chamber musician, he shares the stage with Pierre Amoyal, Giuseppe Gibboni, Philippe Jaroussky, Stanislas Kim, Danielle Laval, Jean-Claude Pennetier, François Salque, Christoph Seybold, as well as the Quatuor Hermès and the Vision String Quartet.

His discography includes a Schubert recital (Wanderer Fantasie and Sonata D.959) released in 2017 on the Lyrinx label, which was awarded with "France Musique's Choice". A Beethoven recital (Bagatelles op. 33, Sonatas op. 81a "Les Adieux" and op. 111) recorded live at the National Theatre in Marseille "La Criée" was released in 2019 on the same label. His CD dedicated to works of César Franck was released in 2023 on Hänssler Classic. Ingmar Lazar recorded also several CDs for the Suoni e Colori label including works by Jean-Philippe Rameau and, in duo with Alexandre Brussilovsky, works by Jean Françaix, Mieczyslaw Weinberg, and Efrem Podgaits. As a defender of contemporary music, he recorded several works of Pascal Arnault for Triton/Hortus.

A former student of Valery Sigalevitch in Paris and of Alexis Golovin in Geneva, he continued his studies with Vladimir Krainev, Zvi Meniker and Bernd Goetzke at the Hochschule für Musik, Theater und Medien Hannover. Thereafter he attended the International Piano Academy Lake Como and the Conservatory of the Italian Switzerland (Lugano) as a Theo Lieven scholar, where he was studying with Dmitri Bashkirov, Malcolm Bilson, Fou Ts'ong, and Stanislav Ioudenitch. He received his Master's and Postgraduate degree from the Universität Mozarteum Salzburg in the class of Pavel Gililov. He pursued a Postgraduate course with Eliso Virsaladze at the Fiesole School of Music. He is a scholarship holder of the International Academy of Music in Liechtenstein, and was also a member of the Philippe Jaroussky Music Academy.

Since 2016, Ingmar Lazar has been the founder and artistic director of the Festival du Bruit qui Pense, which is located in Louveciennes in the Yvelines, in north-central France. He has been appointed in 2024 president of the Association of the Friends of the Château de Commarin in Burgundy, where he serves as artistic director of the location's cultural season.

== Sources ==
- http://musiktage-seefeld.at/programm_kuenstler_ingmar-lazar.php
- http://www.ingmarlazar.com/
