= Raphaël Chrétien =

French cellist and educator

Raphaël Chrétien (born 17 February 1972 in Paris) is a French classical cellist and music educator.

== Biography ==
Raphaël Chrétien was born into a family of musicians and learned the piano and the cello at a very young age with his father and Alain Meunier.

He then entered the Conservatoire de Paris in Philippe Muller's class. After a First Prize of cello and chamber music, he followed a cycle of training during which he met Mstislav Rostropovitch, Janos Starker and Paul Tortelier.

Raphaël Chrétien is the winner of several international competitions, including the Martinů Special Prize at the Prague International Competition and the Grand Prize and the Audience Prize at the Belgrade International Competition.

He has been the guest of major international orchestras including the London Symphony Orchestra, the Orchestre national d'Île-de-France, Les Siècles, the City of Prague Philharmonic Orchestra, the Sinfonieorchester Basel and the Camerata Salzburg. He is also dedicatee and creator of several contemporary works by Nicolas Bacri, Franck Bedrossian, Paul Méfano, Piotr Moss, Philippe Schoeller, Alessandro Solbiati, Christian Lauba, Iannis Xenakis ou Philippe Hersant.

After having been professor at the Conservatory of Bordeaux and Caen, Raphaël Chrétien teaches at the Conservatoire de Paris.

Raphaël Chrétien plays on a Jean-Baptiste Vuillaume of 1866.

== Selected discography ==
- 2008: Édouard Lalo and Camille Saint-Saëns, Sonatas for cello and piano - Olivier Peyrebrune, piano (15/17 février 2008, Ligia Digital) OCLC 713924348.
- 2008: Jacques Offenbach, Duos for cellos - Jérôme Pernoo, cello (27–29 juin 2008, Ligia Digital Lidi 0302194-08) OCLC 743070089.
- 2002: Bohuslav Martinů, Sonatas for cello and piano - Franz Michel, piano (12–14 November 2001, Daphénéo A 202).
- 2000: Guy Ropartz and Henri Duparc, Sonatas for cello and piano - Maciej Pikulski, piano (3–5 July 2000, Daphénéo A 010) OCLC 658897105.
- Ginastera, Sonatas for cello and piano, op. 49, 12 American preludes, op. 12 - Franz Michel, piano (1999, Daphénéo) OCLC 718043154.
- 1998: Jean Huré, Three sonatas for cello and piano - Maciej Pikulski, piano (2–4 September 1998, Daphénéo 9812) OCLC 41468933
- 1997: Alfredo Piatti, Caprices for cello solo (20 December 1996/20 January and 22 February 1997, Daphénéo 9704) OCLC 39388530. World premiere.
