= Trio Wanderer =

French musical trio

The Trio Wanderer is a French piano trio made up of Vincent Coq, piano, Jean-Marc Phillips-Varjabédian, violin, and Raphaël Pidoux, cello, who graduated from the Conservatoire de Paris. In 1988 they won the ARD International Music Competition in Munich, and in 1990 the Fischoff National Chamber Music Competition in the US.

== History ==
The trio has performed at the Berliner Philharmonie, Paris' Théâtre des Champs-Élysées, Wiener Musikverein, London's Wigmore Hall, Milan's Teatro alla Scala, Barcelona's Palau de la Musica, Washington's Library of Congress, Rio de Janeiro's Teatro Municipal, Tokyo's Kioi Hall, Zürich's Tonhalle and Amsterdam's Concertgebouw. They have also performed at major festivals such as Edinburgh, Montreux, Feldkirch, Schleswig Holstein, Rheingau Musiksommer, La Roque-d'Anthéron, the Nantes Folle Journée, Granada, Stresa, Osaka, Salzburg...

They have collaborated with artists such as Yehudi Menuhin, Christopher Hogwood, James Loughran, Victor Pablo Pérez, Ion Marin, Marco Guidarini, François-Xavier Roth, José Areán, Charles Dutoit and James Conlon, accompanied, in triple or double concertos, by orchestras as Toulouse, Nice, Pau, Montpellier, Liège, Santiago de Chile, La Coruna, Teneriffe, by Les Siècles orchestra, Radio-France's Orchestre National and Orchestre Philharmonique, Malaysian Philharmonia Orchestra, Orquesta Sinfónica de Minería, Berlin's Radio Symphonic Orchestra, Sinfonia Varsovia, Graz's Philharmonic Orchester, Köln's Gürzenich Orchester, Stockholm Chamber Orchestra

Trio Wanderer has premiered several works by Thierry Escaich (Lettres Mêlées, 2004), Bruno Mantovani (Huits Moments Musicaux, 2008), Frank Michael Beyer (Lichtspuren, 2008) and Matteo Francescini (Triple Concerto ‘Ego', 2011), Philippe Hersant (Chant de l'Isolé for piano trio, percussions and string orchestra 2014).

In 2014, Jean-Marc Phillips-Varjabédian and Raphaël Pidoux took the positions of Professor of violin and violoncello at the Paris' Conservatoire national supérieur de Musique et de Danse . Vincent Coq is Professor of Chamber Music at the Haute École de Musique de Lausanne since 2010.

In 2015, Trio Wanderer's members were bestowed the Knight of the Order of Arts and Letters (Chevalier dans l'ordre des Arts et Lettres)

== Discography ==
Trio Wanderer has recorded 16 CDs released by Harmonia Mundi since 1999 as well as recordings produced by Sony Classical, Accord, Cyprès, Cappricio and Mirare.

- Dvorak, Trio op. 65 & op. 90 Dumky (Harmonia Mundi)
- Brahms, Trio op. 8 (1854 version), Piano Quartet op. 60 (Harmonia Mundi)
- Fauré, Pierné, Trio op. 120 & op. 45 (Harmonia Mundi)
- Arensky, Tchaikovsky, Trio op. 32 & Trio op. 50 (Harmonia Mundi)
- Mantovani, Huits Moments Musicaux with Claire Désert, piano (Mirare)
- Beethoven, Complete piano trios (Harmonia Mundi)
- Liszt, Smetana, Tristia, Elégies, Trio op. 15 (Harmonia Mundi)
- Fauré, Piano Quartet op. 15 & op. 45 Antoine Tamestit, viola (Harmonia Mundi)
- Escaich, Martinů, Debussy, Bartók, Lettres Mêlées with François Leleux (oboe), Emmanuel Pahud (Flute), Paul Meyer (clarinet) (Accord – Universal)
- Beethoven, Haydn, Pleyel, Folksongs with Wolfgang Holzmair, Baryton (Cyprès)
- Messiaen, Quatuor pour la Fin du Temps with Pascal Moraguès, clarinet (Harmonia Mundi)
- Mendelssohn, Trios op. 49 & op. 66 (Harmonia Mundi)
- Johannes Brahms, Trios op. 8, 87, 101, Quatuor op. 25 with Christophe Gaugué, viola (Harmonia Mundi)
- Camille Saint-Saëns, Trios op. 18 & op. 92 (Harmonia Mundi)
- Dmitri Shostakovich, Aaron Copland, Trios op. 8 & 67, Vitebsk (Harmonia Mundi)
- Martinů, Concert & Concertino with Gürzenich Kölner Philharmoniker, James Conlon conducting (Capriccio)
- Beethoven, Triple Concerto op. 56 with Gürzenich Kölner Philharmoniker, James Conlon conducting (Chant du Monde)
- Schubert, Hummel, Quintette op. 114, Quintette op. 87 Christophe Gaugué, viola, Stéphane Logerot, doublebass (Harmonia Mundi)
- Schubert, Complete piano trios (Harmonia Mundi)
- Haydn, Trios Hob. XV: 27, 28, 29, 25 (Harmonia Mundi)
- Ravel, Chausson, Trio, Trio op. 3 (Harmonia Mundi)
- Smetana, Dvořák, Trio op. 12, Trio op. 90 "Dumky" (Sony Classical)
- Mendelssohn, Trios op. 49 & op. 66 (Sony Classical)

== Awards ==
- 1988: ARD International Music Competition
- 1990: Fischoff National Chamber Music Competition aux États-Unis
- 1997: Victoires de la musique classique
- 2000: Victoires de la musique classique
- 2002: Monde de la Musique 'Choc' of the year
- 2006: Diapason d'Or of the year
- 2007: Midem Classical Award
- 2008: BBC Magazine CD of the Month
- 2009: Victoires de la musique classique
