= Florent Héau =

French classical clarinetist

Florent Héau (born 1968) is a French classical clarinetist. In addition to his concert work and recordings, he gives courses, mainly at the Conservatoire à rayonnement régional de Paris.

== Biography ==
Héau studied clarinet at the Conservatoire de Paris in Michel Arrignon's class. He obtained a First Prize before continuing his training in the advanced cycle.

In 1991 he won the first Grand Prix of the International Music Competition of Toulon. His duo with the pianist Patrick Zygmanowski won the first prizes at the Paris International Chamber Music Competitions (1994).

After an orchestral activity (clarinet solo of the Orchestre de chambre de Paris, the Orchestre Lamoureux and the Ensemble l'Itinéraire), Héau devotes himself to his concert activity with chamber musicians such as Marielle Nordmann, Gérard Caussé, Roland Pidoux, Régis Pasquier, Patrice Fontanarosa, and string quartets (Pražák Quartet, Manfred Quartet, Parisii Quartet, Ysaÿe Quartet, Enesco Quartet), and as soloist with in particular the European Camerata, the Orchestre de Picardie, the Orchestre de chambre de Paris, the Orchestre régional de Cannes-Provence-Alpes-Côte d'Azur, the Ensemble Orchestral de Paris, the chamber orchestra of the Polskie Radio and the Pražský komorní orchestr.

Héau performs in numerous French festivals (Pablo Casals Festival in Prades, La Folle Journée of Nantes, the Festival de Pâques de Deauville...) and in different countries (Belgium, China, Japan, Latvia, Poland, Spain, Kosovo, Hong Kong, South Korea, Taiwan, Georgia...). In 1997, Thierry Escaich entrusted him with the creation of the Chant des ténèbres (concerto for clarinet and orchestra) at the Festival d'Auvers-sur-Oise. In 2009, Héau was asked to give works by Ibarrondo, Bacri and Beffa in world creation.

In 2011, he premiered Philippe Hersant's Concerto pour clarinette.

Héau is also one of the founding members of the musical theatre company "Les Bons Becs", in which he plays the clarinet, but also the sound blade and the tap dance. Since 1996, the show Tempête sur les anches, musical and poetic joke for clarinets and percussion, has been performed in France but also in many countries (Spain, Sweden, Italy, Denmark, Portugal, Germany, Belgium). In 2007, "Les Bons Becs" created a new show: Les Bons Becs en voyage de notes (directed by Caroline Loeb). The show was played in France, but also in Spain and South Korea.

Héau was assistant professor of Michel Arrignon at the Conservatoire de Paris from 1999 to 2003, and is currently professor of clarinet at the Conservatoire à Rayonnement Régional de Paris and at the Haute Ecole de Musique de Lausanne. He is regularly invited to Europe and Asia to give master classes.

== Discography ==
- 2010: Carlos Guastavino's Melodias argentinas with Marcela Roggeri
- 2009: Mozart's Clarinet Concerto K622 - Sinfonia Concertante for Four Winds K297b with the Pražský komorní orchestr, with Nora Cismondi (oboe), Gilbert Audin (bassoon) and Mischa Cliquennois (French horn), live recording (Transart Live).
- 2008: Mozart's Clarinet Quintet K581 - with the Manfred Quartet
- 2007: Brahms' Sonatas for clarinet and piano
- 2006: Robert Schumann's Pieces for viola, piano and clarinet
- 2005: Beethoven's Trios for piano, clarinet and cello
- 2004: Thierry Escaich's Chorus : Scènes de Bal - Nocturne - Jeux de doubles - La Ronde - Nocturne with Claire-Marie Le Guay
- 2004: Nicolas Bacri's Pieces for clarinet with the European Camerata ensemble
- 2003: Johannes Brahms and Max Reger's Sonatas for clarinet and piano - Sonatas for clarinet and piano, Op. 49 N°1 and N°2 - Sonatas for clarinet and piano, Op. 120 N°1 and N°2
- 2002: Stravinsky's L'Histoire du soldat and Bartók's Contrasts - Sonatas for violin and piano
- 2000: Musique française for clarinet and piano
