= Philippe Muller =

French solo and chamber cellist

Philippe Muller (born 20 April 1946, in Mulhouse) is a French cellist.

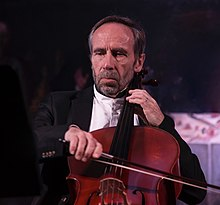

== Biography ==
Philippe Muller (born 20 April 1946, in Mulhouse) is a French cellist and pedagogue.

His first contact with the cello was under the guidance of Dominique Prete, professor at the National School of Music and soloist with the philharmonic orchestra of his native city.

His parents, although passionate about music, did not initially think of making him a professional musician, but they did not oppose his desire to attend the Paris Conservatoire.

With André Navarra, his mentor, Philippe Muller realized the importance of methodical and well-organized work. The years he spends in his class prepare the basis for his own teaching. Guy Fallot and Paul Tortelier will complete his training.

Philippe Muller has devoted an important part of his career to chamber music. For a long time principal cello of the Versailles Chamber Orchestra, he founded in 1970 a trio with Jean-Jacques Kantorow and Jacques Rouvier, which rapidly acquired great national and international renown. In 1976, he joined the Ensemble Intercontemporain where he became familiar with the music of his time. He stayed there for seven years.

In 1979 he was appointed Professor of cello at the most prestigious Conservatoire de Paris, succeeding his teacher André Navarra. A leading figure of the French cello school, he was passionate about teaching and for thirty-five years trained a large number of students, many of whom became renowned soloists. In 2014, reaching retirement age, he emigrated to the United States and accepted a teaching position at the Manhattan School of Music in New York City.

Aside from his teaching duties, he is also frequently invited to serve as a jury member for the most prestigious international cello competitions, f.e. Concours de violoncelle Rostropovitch, International Paulo Cello Competition, Grand Prix Emanuel Feuermann, Pablo Casals International Cello Competition, Isang Yun Competition, George Enescu International Competition, Beijing International Music Competition. In order to maintain a balance between classes and concerts, he performs as a soloist as often as possible and collaborates with numerous ensembles. He is a regular guest in major European, American and Asian cities.

His extensive discography, begun in the seventies, reflects his eclectic tastes and his love of chamber music.

== Famous cellists having studied with Philippe Muller ==
Sophia Bacelar, Emmanuelle Bertrand, Gautier Capuçon, Marc Coppey, Blaise Déjardin, Bruno Delepelaire, Henri Demarquette, Katharina Deserno, Ophélie Gaillard, Anne Gastinel, Alexander Gebert, Christian-Pierre La Marca, Éric & Yan Levionnois, Hee-Young Lim, Dimitri Maslennikov, Edgar Moreau, Kenji Nakagi, Pablo de Naveran, Aurélien Pascal, Jérôme Pernoo, Romain Garioud, Xavier Phillips, Raphaël Pidoux, François Salque, Camille Thomas, Dominique de Williencourt, Sung-Won Yang, William Molina Cestari, Johan van Iersel.

== Discography ==
  - Vivaldi: Six sonatas for Cello and Harpsichord Op. 14 (with Klaus Preis), Da Camera Magna
  - Mozart: Quartets with flute (with András Adorján, Pina Carmirelli, Philipp Naegele), Sastruphon
  - Ludwig van Beethoven: Serenades (avec Pina Carmirelli, Philipp Naegele), Impromptu
  - Johann Sebastian Bach: The musical Offering (with András Adorján, Johannes Nerokas, Bernd Krakow, Masafumi Hori, Maria Fülöp, Philipp Naegele, Jürgen Wolf), Sastruphon, 1972
  - Bohuslav Martinu, Maurice Ravel: Duets for violin and cello (with Pina Carmirelli), Da Camera Magna, 1972
  - Johann Sebastian Bach: The Art of the Fugue (with Pina Carmirelli, Maria Fülöp, Philipp Naegele), Sastruphon, 1973
  - Bohuslav Martinu: Cello Sonatas (with Ralf Gothoni), Da Camera Magna, 1975
  - Cello and Organ (with Rolf Schönstedt), Da Camera Magna, 1976
  - Paganini, Boccherini: Guitare Chamber Music (with Rudolf Wangler, Philipp Naegele, Jean-Claude Bouveresse, Marjan Karuza), Da Camera Song, 1976
  - The Art of the Cello (with Brigitte Haudebourg, Jacques Rouvier, Henri Wojtkowiak, Paul Tortelier), Arion, 1979
  - Bohuslav Martinu, Works for Cello 2 (with Ralf Gothoni), Da Camera Magna,1979
  - Jacques Offenbach : Cello Duets (with Alain Meunier), 1980
  - Gabriel Fauré, César Franck: Works for Cello and Piano (with Jacques Rouvier), Harmonia Mundi, 1982
  - Michel Merlet: Chamber Music (with Jean-Jacques Kantorow, Pascal Devoyon), Cybelia, 1983
  - Guy Ropartz: Sonatas for cello and piano (with Monique Bouvet), Oybella, 1989
  - Igor Stravinsky: Florence Gould Hall Chamber Players (with Pierre-Henri Xuereb, Jean-Louis Haguenauer, Michel Lethiec, Annick Roussin, Alexis Galperine, Fabrice Pierre, Patrick Gallois), OPES 3D, 1993
  - Jacques Castérède: Trois paysages d'Automne (with Atelier Musique Ville d'Avray, conductor: Jean-Louis Petit), REM, 1999
  - Ivo Malec: Arco-I, Motus, 1999
  - Johan Sebastien Bach: The 6 Suites for cello solo, Passavant Music, 2008
  - Jean Cras: Chamber Music (with Shikiko Tsuruzono, Akiko Nanashima, Jacques Gauthier), Fontec, 2012

In a trio with Jean-Jacques Kantorow and Jacques Rouvier

- Dmitri Shostakovich, Bohuslav Martinu: Twentieth century trios, Da Camera Magna, 1971
- Maurice Ravel: Trio for piano, violon, cello / Sonata for violon and cello, Erato, 1975
- Johannes Brahms: Trio n°1, Opus 8 in B for piano, violin and cello, Sarastro, 1977
- Beethoven: The Archduke Trio Opus 97, Accord, 1978
- Johannes Brahms: Trios opus 87 (C major), opus 101 (C minor), Accord, 1979
- Hans Pfitzner: Trio in F minor Opus 8 for piano, violin and cello, Da Camera, 1980
- Franz Schubert: Trio Opus 99, Forlane, 1982
- Franz Schubert: Trout Quintet Opus 114, (with Vladimir Mendelssohn and Duncan Mc.Tier), Forlane, 1982
- Debussy, Ravel, Fauré: Trios for piano, violin and cello, Denon, 1993

With the Heidelberg Chamber Orchestra

- Antonio Vivaldi: Concertos for cello, Sastruphon
- George-Philipp Telemann: Triple concerto in B flat major, concert in G major, concert suite in D major, Da Camera Magna, 1974

Within l'Octuor de Paris

- Franz Schubert: Octet in F, Opus 166 (with Jean-Pierre Laroque, Guy Deplus, Gabin Lauridon, Daniel Bourgue, Jean-Louis Bonafous, Gérard Klam, Jean Léber), CGD, 1978

Within l'Ensemble Intercontemporain

- Maurice Ravel : Chansons madécasses (with Jessye Norman, Alain, Marion, Pierre-Laurent Aimard), 1979
- Arnold Schoenberg: The Transfigured Night, Op.4 (with Charles-André Linale, Maryvonne Le Dizès, Jean Sulem, Garth Knox, Pierre Strauch)
