= Hee-Young Lim =

South Korean classical cellist

Hee-Young Lim (born 1987, Seoul) is a South Korean classical cellist.

Born to parents who are not musicians, Lim received her first cello as a gift from a friend of her mother. Lim entered Korean National University at age 15, as the youngest student ever to be accepted there.

Lim moved to the United States to further her education at the New England Conservatory (NEC). Upon graduation from NEC, she continued studies at the Conservatoire National Supérieur de Musique de Paris, where her teachers included Philippe Muller. She graduated from the Paris conservatory with ‘Highest Distinction’ (mention très bien à l’unanimité). She also studied at the Hochschule für Musik 'Franz Liszt' Weimar, where she earned her Konzertexamen degree “mit auszeichnung” (summa cum laude).

In 2007, Lim made her North American recital debut at The Kennedy Center in Washington, DC. Lim won first prize at the 2009 Washington International Competition for Strings. She was a Silver Medalist of the 2009 Houston Symphony Ima Hogg Young Artist Competition, She won the Grand Prix at the Normandy International Forum (France), and won third prize at the Witold Lutosławski International Cello Competition in Warsaw.

In 2015, Lim became principal solo cellist of the Rotterdam Philharmonic Orchestra, appointed by Yannick Nézet-Séguin. In September 2018, Lim relocated to Beijing, to take up her new appointment with the Beijing Central Conservatory, the first Korean cellist named to the Beijing faculty.

Lim made her debut recording for Sony Classical, titled "French Cello Concertos", with the London Symphony Orchestra and conductor Scott Yoo.
