= Xavier Phillips =

French cellist

Xavier Phillips (born 1971 in Paris) is a French contemporary classical cellist, the brother of violinist Jean-Marc Phillips-Varjabédian.

== Biography ==
Xavier Phillips started learning the cello at the age of 6. He entered the Conservatoire de Paris in 1986 and studied with Philippe Muller. He obtained the First Prize of the Conservatory in 1989. After a third prize at the Rostropovich Competition in 1989, he continued his training with Mstislav Rostropovich, who particularly noticed him. They worked together for a dozen years, the master inviting him regularly as a soloist of the orchestras he was led to direct.

Xavier Phillips premiered the Cello Concerto by Jean-Louis Agobet in Caen on 19 March 2010.

Xavier Phillips plays on a 1710 cello by Matteo Goffriller.

== Selected discography ==
- Sonates pour violoncelle et piano: sonata by Alfred Schnittke; sonata Op. 40 in D minor by Shostakovich; sonata Op. 119 in C major by Prokofiev with Hüseyin Sermet as the pianist, at Harmonia mundi, HMN 911628.
- Armenia: Interpretations of Armenian composers' works (Aram Khachaturian, Arno Babadjanian...etc); with Vahan Mardirossian and Jean-Marc Phillips-Varjabédian, at Lontano-Warner.
