= Jean-Louis Agobet =

French composer (born 1968)

Jean-Louis Agobet (born 21 April 1968) is a French composer.

Agobet was born in Blois Loir-et-Cher. He studied with Philippe Manoury at the Conservatoire de Lyon.

Following a residence at the Orchestre philharmonique de Strasbourg conductor François-Xavier Roth's recording of his works on the Timpani label was awarded record of the year at the Victoires de la musique classique in 2005.

He is currently professor of composition at the Conservatoire de Bordeaux.
