= Victoires de la musique classique =

French classical music awards

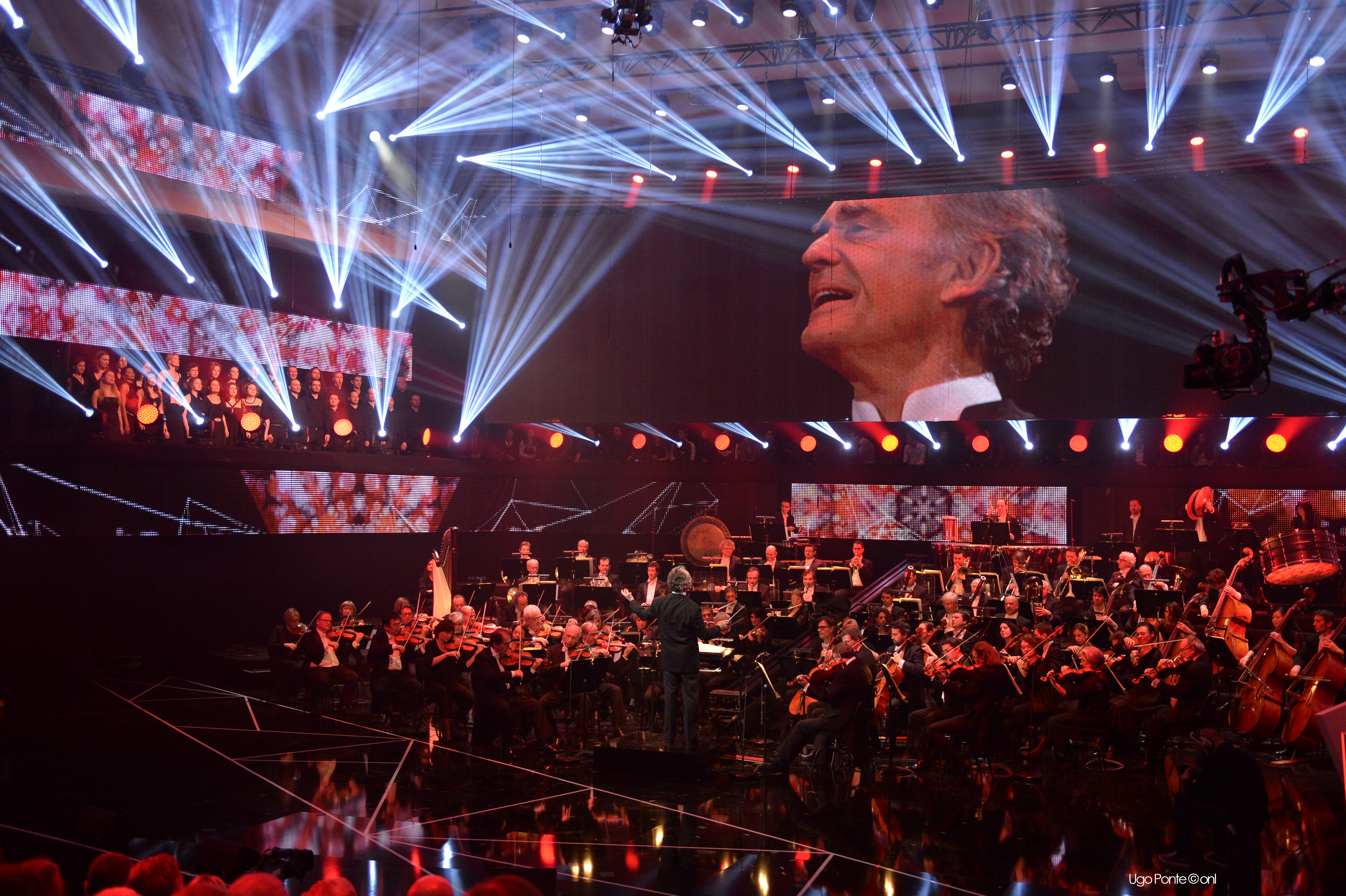
2015 event in the Nouveau Siècle, Lille

The Victoires de la musique classique (French: [viktwar də la myzik klasik]; English: "Victories of Classical Music") are an annual French classical music award event founded in 1986. The awards are the classical equivalent of the popular music awards Victoires de la Musique and the Victoires du Jazz. Most of the awards are for actual performers, orchestras, composers, etc. as opposed to the Diapason d'Or given to recordings, though there is an Enregistrement français de musique classique de l'année (English: "French Classical Music Recording of the Year").

== Categories ==
For full listing of winners see fr:Victoires de la musique classique, not every prize is awarded each year:

1. Singer of the Year
2. Revelation opera singer
3. instrumental soloist of the year
4. Revelation Instrumental Soloist of the Year
5. International Revelation of the Year
6. Conductor of the Year
7. Chamber Music Ensemble of the year
8. Instrumental Ensemble of the Year
9. Vocal Ensemble of the Year
10. Composer of the Year
11. Creation of the year
12. Concert of classical music or opera performance of the year
13. Representation of the year lyric
14. Contribution to International French music of the year
15. Production France choreographic year
16. Recording of French classical music of the year
17. Recording of Opera of the year
18. Recording of foreign classical music of the year
19. Recording music or baroque old year
20. DVD of the year
21. Wins Honor

=== Enregistrement français de musique classique de l'année ===
- 1986 : Préludes (Debussy) of Claude Debussy played by Alain Planès
- 1987 : Intégrale des œuvres pour piano d'Erik Satie played by Aldo Ciccolini and Gabriel Tacchino
- 1988 : Prélude à l'après-midi d'un faune of Claude Debussy, L'Apprenti sorcier de Paul Dukas, Pavane pour une défunte of Maurice Ravel and Gymnopédies 1,3 of Erik Satie by the Orchestre national de France dir. Georges Prêtre
- 1990 : Carmen of Georges Bizet by Jessye Norman Chœur de Radio France, Maîtrise de Radio France, Orchestre national de France dir. Seiji Ozawa,
- 1991 : L'Intégrale de l'œuvre pour orchestre de Maurice Ravel Cleveland Orchestra and the New York Philharmonic dir. Pierre Boulez
- 1992 : Les Quatuors dédiés à Haydn, tome 1 Mozart by the Quatuor Mosaïques
- 1993 : Montezuma of Vivaldi by la Grande Écurie et la Chambre du Roy dir. Jean-Claude Malgoire
- 1994 : Dialogue des Carmélites (Poulenc) Catherine Dubosc, Rita Gorr, José van Dam, Orchestre de l'Opéra national de Lyon, dir. Kent Nagano
- 1995 : Éclair sur l'au-delà (Messiaen) by the Orchestra of the Opéra Bastille under Myung-Whun Chung
- 1999 : Lakmé (Delibes) interpreted par Natalie Dessay, Gregory Kunde, José Van Dam, Orchestre national du Capitole de Toulouse dir. Michel Plasson
- 2002 : Italian Arias (Gluck) by Cecilia Bartoli, Akademie für Alte Musik Berlin
- 2003 : Pelléas et Mélisande (Debussy) by Anne-Sofie von Otter, Wolfgang Holzmair, Laurent Naouri, Orchestre national de France dir. Bernard Haitink
- 2004 : Carmen (Bizet) by Angela Gheorghiu, Roberto Alagna, choir Les Éléments, Orchestre national du Capitole de Toulouse dir. Michel Plasson
- 2006 : Génération, Phonal, Feuermann, Ritratto concertante (Jean-Louis Agobet) by Michel Portal, Paul Meyer, Alain Billard, Xavier Phillips, Alexandre Paley, Orchestre philharmonique de Strasbourg, dir. François-Xavier Roth
- 2008 : Carestini, histoire d'un castrat, recital Philippe Jaroussky, Le Concert d'Astrée, dir. Emmanuelle Haïm
- 2009 : Lamenti, recital Natalie Dessay, Rolando Villazón, Joyce DiDonato, Patrizia Ciofi, Philippe Jaroussky, Laurent Naouri, Marie-Nicole Lemieux, Véronique Gens, Christopher Purves, Topi Lehtipuu, Simon Wall and Le Concert d'Astrée, dir. Emmanuelle Haïm
- 2011 : Les concertos pour piano de Ravel, Pierre-Laurent Aimard, Cleveland Orchestra, dir. Pierre Boulez
- 2012 : Les Années de pèlerinage Franz Liszt played by Bertrand Chamayou
- 2013 : Le boeuf sur le Toit by Alexandre Tharaud
- 2014 : Correspondances Henri Dutilleux with Barbara Hannigan and Orchestre philharmonique de Radio France, conducted Esa-Pekka Salonen (Deutsche Grammophon)
- 2015 : Köthener Trauermusik BWV 244a Johann Sebastian Bach, Ensemble Pygmalion, dir. Raphaël Pichon (Harmonia Mundi).
