= Éric Le Sage =

French classical pianist

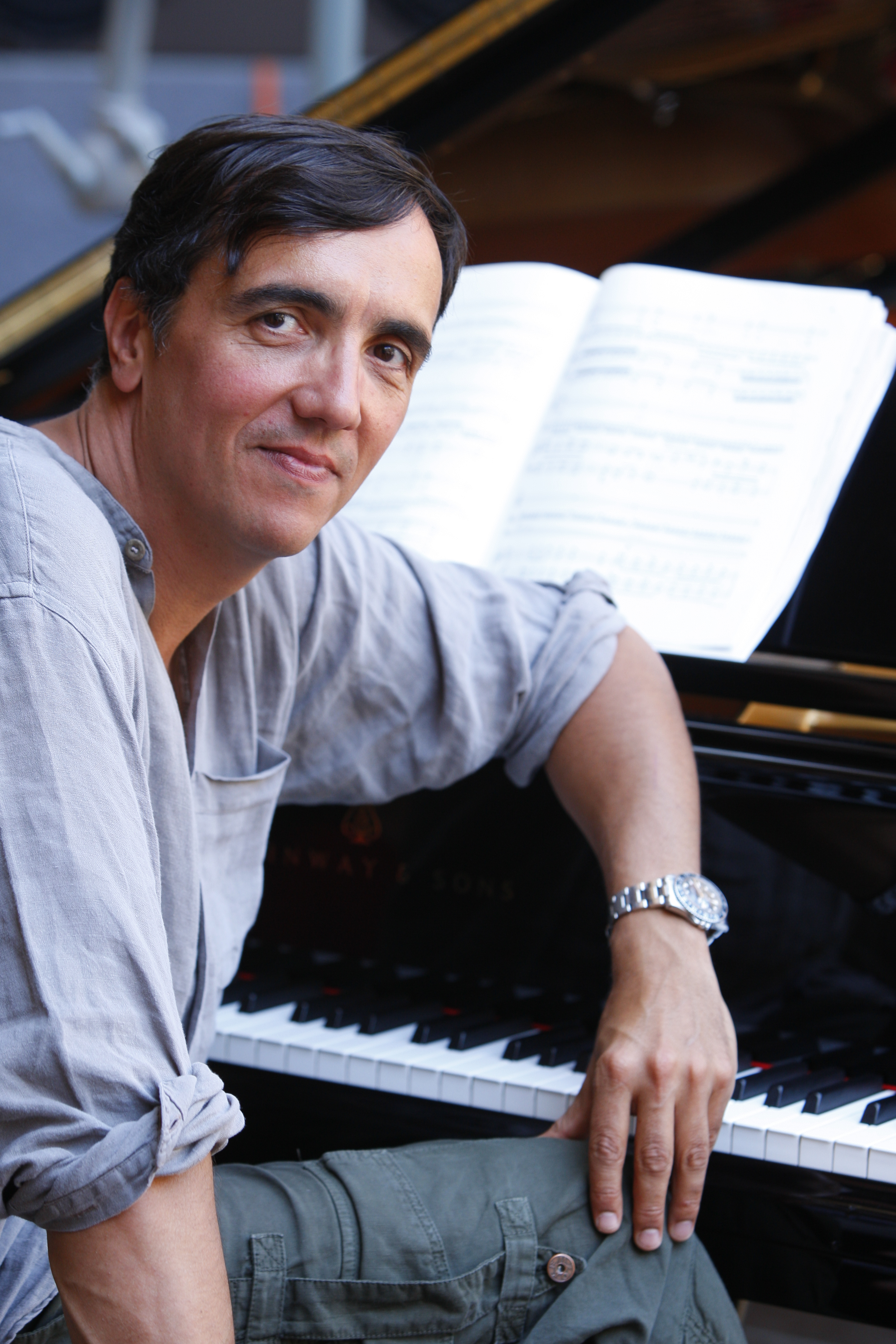
- Le Sage in 2009

Background information
- Born: 15 June 1964 (age 62); Aix-en-Provence, France
- Genres: classical
- Instrument: piano

Éric Le Sage (born 15 June 1964 in Aix-en-Provence) is a contemporary French classical pianist.

== Biography ==
After he finished his studies at the Conservatoire de Paris, Le Sage went to London to improve by Maria Curcio.

Éric Le Sage is best known for his interpretations of romantic music, Schumann, but also for recording the complete piano music of Francis Poulenc.

His curiosity for the unknown works led him to play more than twenty rare concertos by Dvořák, Schoenberg, Stravinsky, Britten and others. Lesage is a guest of renowned groups such as the Orchestre philharmonique de Radio France, the Royal Scottish National Orchestra or the Dresden Philharmonic.

== Prizes ==
He was the winner of the Porto International Piano Competition in 1985, of the Robert Schumann International Competition for Pianists and Singers at Zwickau in 1989 and of the Leeds competition in 1990. In 2000 and 2001, he obtained the grand prix du disque of the Académie Charles Cros, a Victoire de la musique classique, the Prix Caecilia and the Japanese "Record of the year" for his complete recordings of chamber music pieces by Poulenc.

== Festivals ==
He has participated in festivals such as the Festival de La Roque-d'Anthéron, Festival de Radio France et Montpellier, Menton, Évian or Strasbourg. In 1993 he was cofounder of the Festival international de musique de Salon-de-Provence. On 17 August 2010, Éric le Sage was in Jonzac on the occasion of the festival organized by the cultural association of the Val de Seugne; he was then accompanied by clarinetist Paul Meyer and cellist François Salque.
