= Jérôme Pernoo =

French contemporary cellist (born 1972)

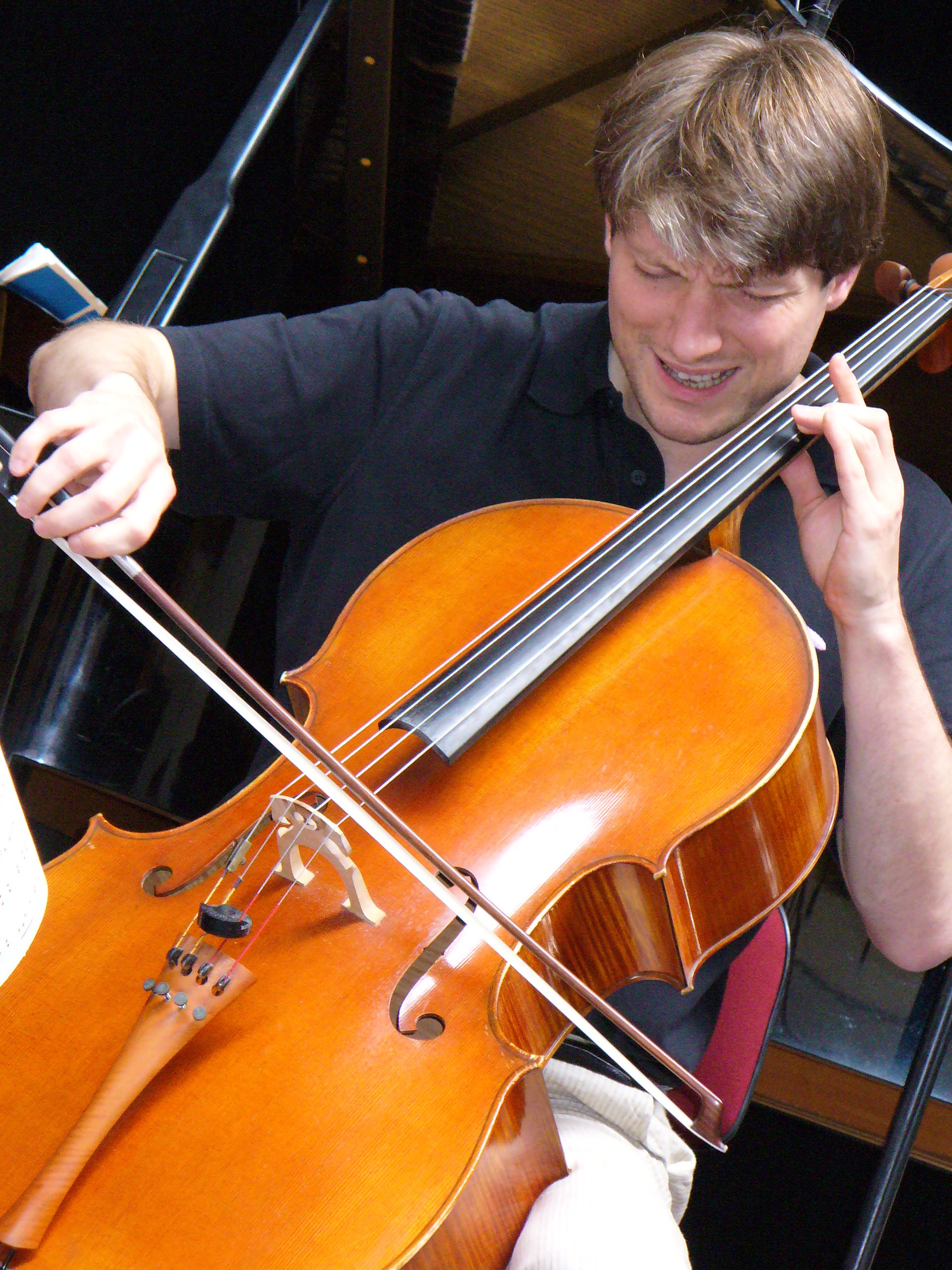
- Jérôme Pernoo during the festival "Les Vacances de Monsieur Haydn"
- Born: 1972 (age 52–53); Nantes
- Occupation(s): Cellist; Music educator

Jérôme Pernoo (born 1972) is a French contemporary cellist.

== Biography ==
Jérôme Pernoo learned to play the cello with Germaine Fleury then Xavier Gagnepain. After his studies at the Conservatoire de Paris with Philippe Muller, he obtained the 3rd prize of the Concours de violoncelle Rostropovitch in Paris in 1994 and won the Pretoria competition in 1996.

Jérôme Pernoo has performed with most major French and foreign orchestras. He plays in recitals with pianist Jérôme Ducros, on some of the most prestigious musical scenes such as the Wigmore Hall in London, the Théâtre du Châtelet, the Théâtre des Champs-Élysées or la Cité de la musique in Paris.

In September 2008, he premiered the cello concerto that Guillaume Connesson dedicated to him, with the Rouen Philharmonic Orchestra under the direction of Jérémie Rhorer.

In 2013, he was invited to the Carnegie Hall of New York City and the following year to the Berliner Philharmonie.

After seven years teaching at Royal College of Music de London, Pernoo was appointed professor of cello at the Paris Conservatory of Music and Dance in 2005.

He is also the creator and artistic director of the festival "Les Vacances de Monsieur Haydn", located at La Roche-Posay, of which the first edition took place in September 2005.

In 2015, he created the "Centre de musique de chambre de Paris", in residence at the Salle Cortot in Paris.

He plays Italian anonymous 18th century baroque cello and piccolo cello, school of Milan, as well as a modern cello made for him by Franck Ravatin.

In September 2023, Pernoo was sentenced to a one-year suspended sentence for sexual assault on a minor (a 14-year-old former student at the time of the incident in 2005 in London). The sentence handed down by the Paris Criminal Court is accompanied by a ban on engaging in any voluntary or professional activity with minors for ten years. Pernoo and his lawyers pointed out that he has been found innocent of all but one charges and will consider an appeal.

== Discography ==
- 1998 – J. S. Bach – Six Suites a Violoncello solo senza Basso (Ligia Digital)
- 2002 – Giovanni Battista degli Antonii/Domenico Gabrielli – 12 Ricercate Op. 1 for Cello Solo / 7 Ricercari for Cello Solo (Ogam)
- 2002 – Sergei Rachmaninoff/Frank Bridge – Sonata for Cello and Piano Op. 19 / Sonata for Cello and Piano, 4 Pieces for Cello and Piano – with Jérôme Ducros (Ogam)
- 2006 – Camille Saint-Saëns – Cello Concerto No. 2, Op. 119 – with the Orchestre de Bretagne, under the direction of Nicolas Chalvin (timpani)
- 2006 – Jacques Offenbach – Grand Concerto for Violoncello and Orchestra – Concerto "Militaire" – with Les Musiciens du Louvre, under the direction of Marc Minkowski (Archiv-Deutsche Grammophon)
- 2008 – Jacques Offenbach – Duets for cellos – with Raphaël Chrétien (Ligia Digital)
- 2009 – Ludwig van Beethoven – Kreutzer Sonata (transcription by Carl Czerny); Sonata Op. 69; Variations on The Magic Flute – with Jérôme Ducros (Ligia Digital)
- 2011 – Guillaume Connesson – chamber music – with Jérôme Ducros (piano), Sergey Malov (violin), Ayako Tanaka (violin), Lise Berthaud (viola), Florent Héau (clarinet), (Collection Pierre Bergé)
- 2013 – Jérôme Ducros – En aparté, Trio and Quintet with piano – with Jérôme Ducros (piano), Sergey Malov and Mi-Sa Yang (violins), and Gérard Caussé (viola), (Decca)
- 2014 – Guillaume Connesson – Cello Concerto – under the direction of Jean-Christophe Spinosi with the Monte-Carlo Philharmonic Orchestra (Deutsche Grammophon)

== Books ==
- 2009 – L'Amateur (publisher: Le Fond des Coulisses), out of print, ISBN 978-2-9532889-0-2
- 2013 – L'Amateur, Lyon, Symétrie, 432 p. ISBN 978-2-914373-94-4 read online
