= Claire-Marie Le Guay =

French classical pianist

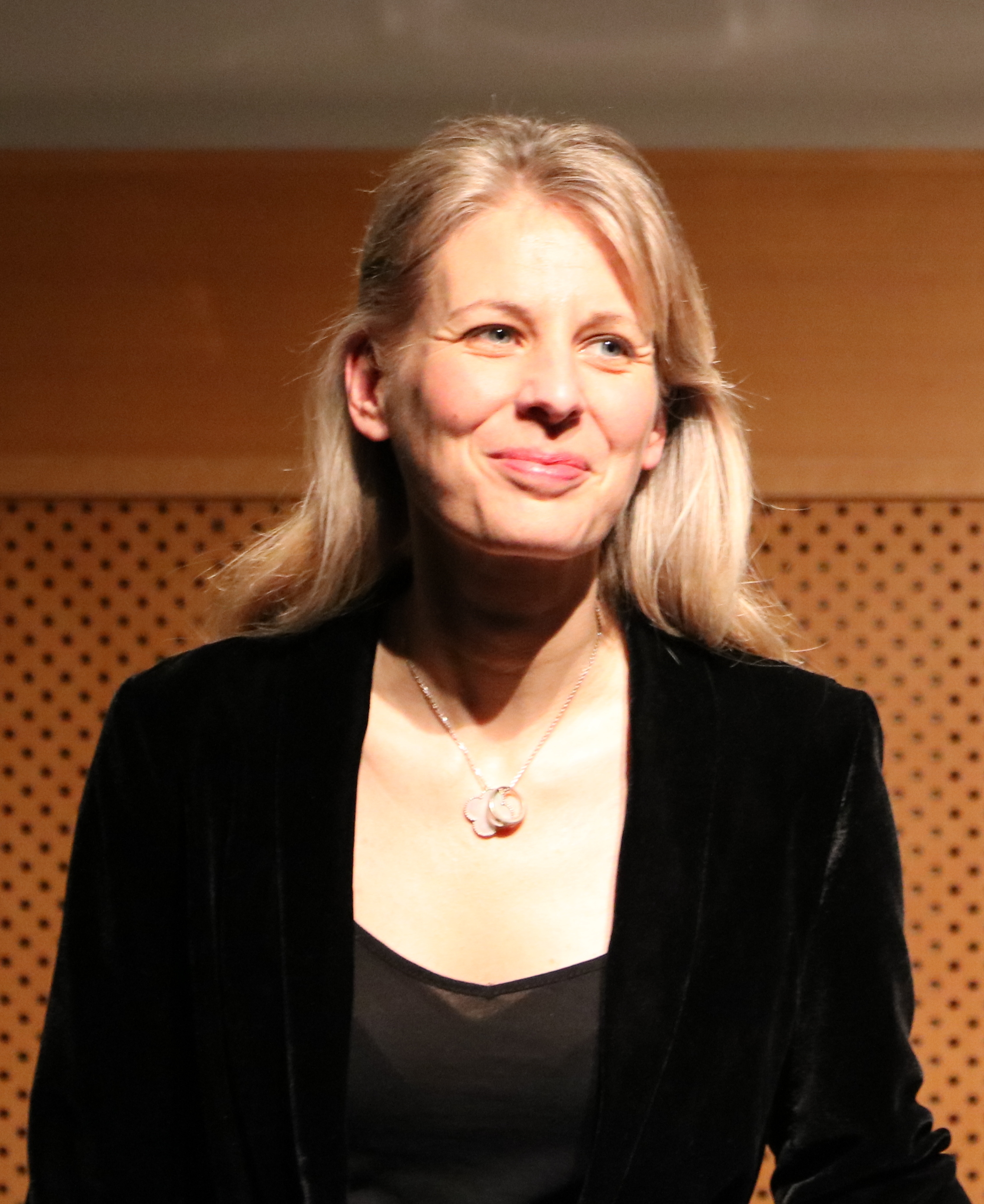
Le Guay, 2017

Claire-Marie Le Guay (born 13 June 1974) is a French classical pianist.

== Early life ==
Le Guay was born in Paris, France. She began playing piano at age 4 and entered the Paris Conservatoire at age 14, where she studied with Jacques Rouvier, Pascal Devoyon and Bruno Rigutto. Following her education in Paris, Le Guay continued her training with a variety of established teachers, including Dmitri Bashkirov, Fou Ts'ong, Claude Frank, Stanislav Ioudenitch, Alicia de Larrocha, William Grant Naboré, Andreas Staier, György Sebők, and Leon Fleisher.

== Accomplishments and award ==
Year	Award	Title	Notes
1990	First prize winner	International Contest of Chamber Music of Portogruaro	Italy
1994	Prize-winner	Maria Canals competition	Barcelona
1994	First prize winner	ARD	Munich
1998	Voted France's Young Musician of the Year	-	-

Le Guay has also been championed by Daniel Barenboim, who invited her to perform with the Chicago Civic Orchestra. Le Guay has performed at a variety of prestigious venues including Carnegie Hall and Wigmore Hall.

In 2015 Le Guay was selected to participate in the 2nd Women's Leadership Program Eisenhower Fellows.

== Current projects ==
Le Guay is currently recording her final two installments of the four-volume Haydn-Mozart series, to be released on the Universal Accord label.

She has also worked as an assistant to Bruno Rigutto at the Paris Conservatoire since 2001.

== Recordings ==
Year	Title	Composer	Notes
2000	Sonatas	Bartók-Carter-Dutilleux	Universal Accord
2007	Works for piano volume 1	Haydn-Mozart	Universal Accord
2007	Works for piano volume 2	Haydn-Mozart	Universal Accord
-	Orchestral Works	Thierry Escaich	Universal Accord
2012	12 Etudes d'exécution transendante	Liszt	Universal Accord
2003	Concertos and Légendes	Liszt	Universal Accord
1997	Kreisleriana op 16; Carnaval op 9	Schumann	Universal Accord
-	Petrushka; Daphnis et Chloé	Stravinsky-Ravel	Universal Accord
