= Wolfgang Holzmair =

Austrian baritone (born 1952)

Wolfgang Holzmair (born 1952 in Vöcklabruck) is an Austrian baritone.

Holzmair studied at the Vienna Academy of Music and Dramatic Art. He won 2nd prize in the baritone class of the 's-Hertogenbosch International Vocal Competition in 1981, and a year later 1st prize in the Musikverein International Lieder Competition, Vienna.

== Opera ==
Holzmair spent about six years with opera companies in Bern (Bern Theatre) and Gelsenkirchen (Musiktheater im Revier) before successes in Udo Zimmermann's The White Rose and Claude Debussy's Pelléas et Mélisande brought him to general attention. His repertoire includes rarely performed works such as Henze's Boulevard Solitude, Nigel Osborne’s The Electrification of the Soviet Union, Hindemith's Neues vom Tage and Poulenc's Les mamelles de Tirésias.

More standard works include Richard Strauss's Capriccio (the Count), Ariadne auf Naxos (Harlequin and the Music Master), Der Rosenkavalier (Faninal); Mozart's The Magic Flute (Papageno and the Speaker) and Così fan tutte (Guglielmo and Don Alfonso); Wagner's Tannhäuser (Wolfram), and Meistersinger (Beckmesser). In the 2009/2010 season he sang Demetrius in the Canadian Opera Company's production of Benjamin Britten's A Midsummer Night's Dream, the Father in Humperdinck's Hänsel und Gretel on a tour in Japan, and the Sorceress in a concert performance of Purcell's Dido and Aeneas in Vienna

== Song recital and orchestral concerts ==
Holzmair's high, rather light timbre is particularly suitable for song and in 1989 a highly successful debut at the Wigmore Hall launched his international recital career. His clear and expressive language embedded in a pure legato line, and his dramatic commitment, have been especially commended. The English music critic Alan Blyth was immediately struck by the baritone’s first recording of Schubert's Die Schöne Müllerin and remained a firm advocate; more recently Richard Fairman referred to an exceptional ability to communicate the rhythms and meanings of poetry.

He has worked with many pianists of note, a long-standing collaboration with Imogen Cooper being widely admired for its exceptionally close rapport; other partners include Andreas Haefliger and Philippe Cassard as well as dedicated accompanists Gerard Wyss, Russell Ryan and Roger Vignoles. He also maintains a strong presence in the world of chamber music, where the Trio Wanderer, the Nash Ensemble and the Rachmaninov Trio are among his collaborators. Holzmair regularly appears in major centres in Europe and North America, and also travels to outlying venues where communities have fewer opportunities to hear live recitals. Recent European Music Festivals include Risør, Kuhmo, Lockenhaus, Kyburgiade, the Oxford Lieder Festival and styriarte, and he has also participated in La Folle Journée's program for bringing classical music to new audiences. In 2010 Holzmair and the Departure Centre for Creative Design in Vienna collaborated in a bid to attract new listeners to lieder, by presenting concerts in which the baritone and 6 compatriots performed Wolf against visual backdrops. The experiment was deemed a success, and was repeated for Mahler’s lieder, with a slightly different cast of singers, in 2011. The Wolf series is now available on 5 DVDs, which show the visuals but not the singers.

Holzmair's wide-ranging repertoire includes melodies as well as lieder and extends from the 18th to the 21st century. He has long been committed to bringing to attention the "Entartete" composers who suffered under the Nazi regime and has recorded lieder by Hanns Eisler, Franz Mittler, Erich Zeisl, Ernst Krenek, Franz Schreker and composers from Theresienstadt; in 2010 he joined the Nash Ensemble in a week-end show-casing music by the Theresienstadt composers, at the Wigmore Hall.

He has performed orchestrated lieder with many leading orchestras, as in the 2010 Styriarte Festival; other recent orchestral appearances have been in Britten's War Requiem, Brahms' Deutsches Requiem, Darius Milhaud's Les Choephores and Schumann's Scenes from Faust.

== Song premieres and commissions ==
Premieres since 2000 include Kurt Schwertsik's Die Welt eine Laute and Fioretti per San Francesco, a chamber version of Hans Werner Henze's Five Neapolitan Songs with the Nash Ensemble (as part of a 75th birthday tribute to the composer), Dmitry Smirnov's Eternal Refuge with the Altenburg Trio Wien (recorded by Austrian Radio), Daniel Schnyder's one-act opera Mozart and Casanova (at the Menuhin Festival, Gstaad), Helmut Schmidinger's solo cantata Mozart Briefe (with the Bruckner Orchestra of Linz, as part of Mozart's 250th), and David Matthews' arrangements of Brahms' lieder and of part of Franz Schubert's Schwanengesang (commissioned by the Nash Ensemble); recent additions are Schmidinger's Wo der Bartl den Most holt and the Austrian premiere of Lori Laitman's Seed of Dreams. His Erich Zeisl disc marking the composer's 100th anniversary included unpublished songs, and he contributed to a recording of new settings of Eduard Mörike's poetry commissioned by the Hugo Wolf Institute of Stuttgart, to celebrate the poet's 200th birthday. Holzmair has commissioned David Leisner to compose a new piece for baritone and string quartet and the resulting work, A Timeless Procession, will be premiered in a future season.

== Teaching ==
Since 1998 Holzmair has taught at the Salzburg Mozarteum and given master classes in Europe and North America; 2011 finds him participating in the annual Schubert Institute Master Course in Baden bei Wien for the 7th time. In 2008 the Royal College of Music made him a Fellow in recognition of services to the college and to music, and in 2009 he was a juror for the Wigmore Hall Song competition. He is an advisor to the Lotte Lehmann Foundation, and contributed to the foundation's first CD.

== Selected recordings ==
- Schubert Die schöne Müllerin with Jörg Demus, 1983 Preiser
- Ein deutsches Requiem with Herbert Blomstedt, 1996 Decca Grammy Award
- Brahms Die Schone Magelone with Gerard Wyss and Will Quadfleg, 1986 Tudor
- Braunfels Die Vögel with Lothar Zagrosek, 1992 Decca
- Schubert lieder to texts by Mayrhofer with Gerard Wyss, 1993 Tudor
- Schumann Heine Lieder with Imogen Cooper, 1996 Philips
- Beethoven, Haydn and Mozart Lieder with Imogen Cooper, 2000 Philips
- Krenek and Schubert Lieder with Russell Ryan, 2003 Orf
- Beethoven, Pleyel, Haydn, Songs from the British Isles with the Trio Wanderer, 2008 Cypres
- Wolf Songs with Imogen Cooper, 2009 Wigmore Live
- Songs from Theresienstadt with Russell Ryan, 2009 Bridge
- Ravel Melodies and Trio with Ensemble Musique Oblique, 2009 Alphee

== See also ==
- List of Austrians in music
