= Jean-François Zygel =

French pianist and composer

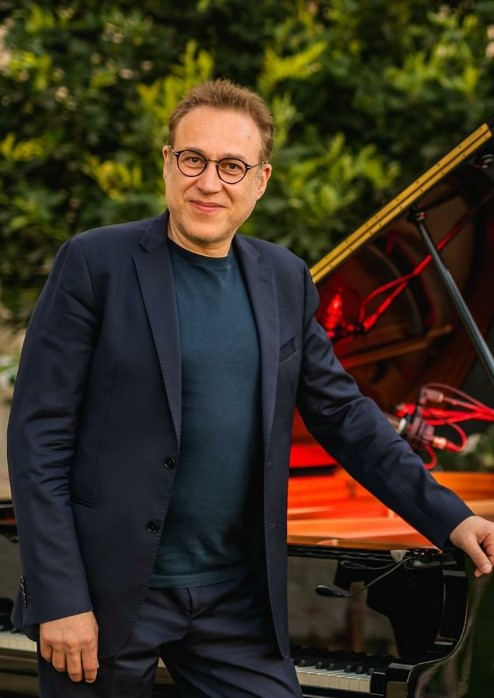
Jean-François Zygel, 2020

Jean-François Zygel (born 23 November 1960) is a French pianist, improviser, composer and improvisation teacher for piano at the Conservatoire de Paris.

Born in Paris, he is also known for his work in introducing classical music on television and radio.

Zygel's music is nourished by synagogue cantillation. Two of his great-grandfathers were hazzanim in Poland.

== Awards ==
- Chevalier de la Légion d'honneur (2015).
- Chevaliers of the Ordre des Arts et des Lettres.
- Chevalier de l'Ordre national du Mérite (2006).

== On France Inter ==
At the beginning of 2015, France Inter entrusted him with a weekly programme entitled La Preuve par Z. The composer evokes and explains the great composers, with long excerpts from concerts in support.

== On France Télévisions ==
On 31 August 2017, Zygel presented "Zygel Académie" on France 2, a show where celebrities discover classical music. It has 601,000 viewers, or 7.3% of the audience.

== Publications ==
- Quand du stérile hiver a resplendi l'ennui ... Conditions d'existence du langage musical, in Le Débat, issue 82, November–December 1994, p. 31-34.

== Bibliography ==
- Interview by B. Dermoncourt, in Classica-Repertoire, February 2008, p. 39-55.
- "Z comme Jean-François Zygel : la musique sort de sa boîte", in Improvisation so piano, Jean-Pierre Thiollet, Neva Éditions, 2017, p. 137-142. ISBN 978-2-35055-228-6
