= François Salque =

American musician

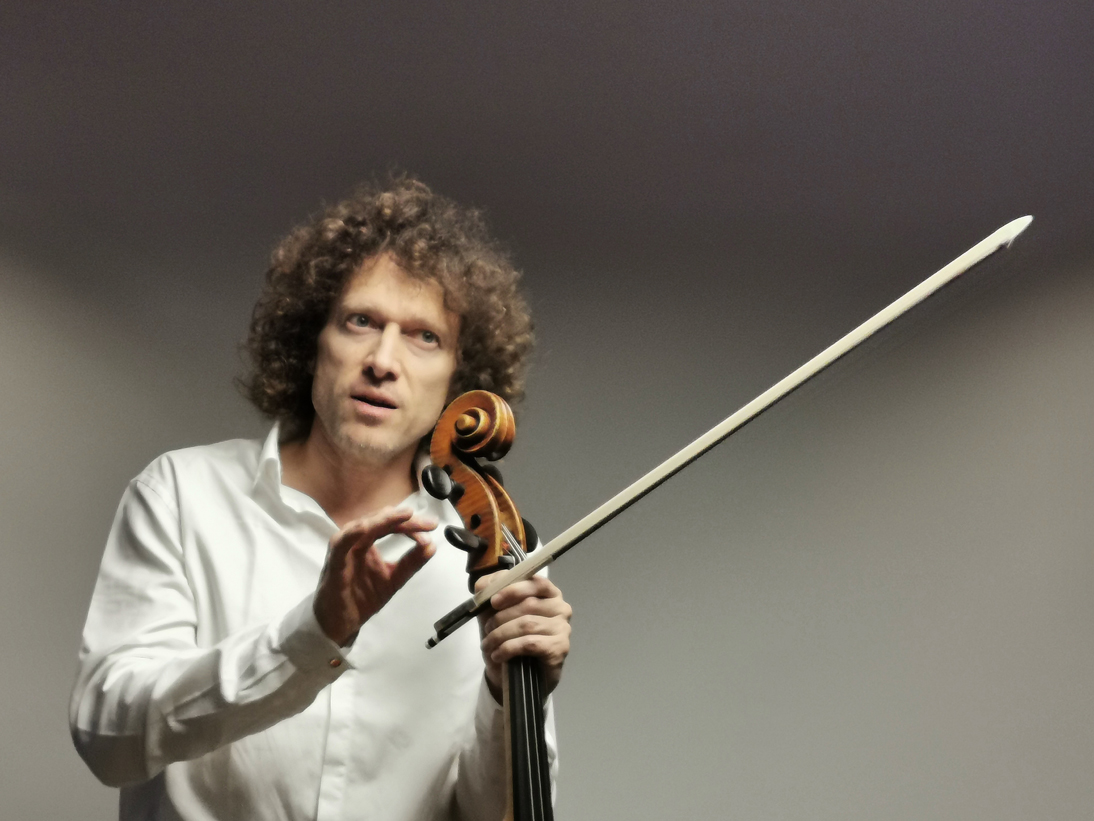
- Salque in 2019
- Occupations: Classical cellist; Academic teacher
- Organizations: Haute École de musique de Lausanne; Conservatoire de Paris

François Salque is a French classical cellist and academic teacher. He has recorded especially chamber music.

== Life and career ==
A graduate from Yale University, Salque teaches at the Haute École de musique de Lausanne and at the Conservatoire de Paris.

Salque has played and recorded chamber music with Éric Le Sage, Alexandre Tharaud, Emmanuel Pahud and Vincent Peirani. Salque also played in the Ysaÿe Quartet from 2000 to 2004, recording Fauré, Magnard, Haydn, Schumann, Boucourechliev, but also little known works or fragments by Beethoven, the piano quintet by César Franck (with Pascal Rogé) and the Clarinet Quintet by Mozart (with Michel Portal).

Nicolas Bacri, Karol Beffa, Thierry Escaich, Bruno Mantovani and Krystof Maratka have dedicated works to Salque.

== Discography ==
Salque has recorded for the Æon, Alpha, Arion, Lyrinx, Naïve, RCA, Sony and Zig-Zag Territoires labels.

Salque's numerous recordings have received awards from the Diapason d'or de l'année, "Chocs" of the Le Monde de la musique, "10" of Répertoire des disques compacts, Grand Prix du disque de l'Académie Charles-Cros, Victoires de la Musique.

- Beethoven, Cello Sonatas - François Salque, cello; Éric Le Sage, piano (March 2014, Sony)
- Brahms, Cello Sonatas - François Salque, cello; Éric Le Sage, piano
- Fauré, Pelléas et Mélisande; Élégie; Mélodies; Wagner, Siegfried Idyll - Orchestre de l'Opéra de Rouen Haute-Normandie, Oswald Sallaberger, cond.; François Salque, cello (18-22 July 2011, Zig-Zag Territoires) OCLC 780955696
- Saint-Saëns, The Carnival of the Animals; Ladmirault, Les mémoires d'un âne - Claude Piéplu, narrator; Laurent Cabasso and Alexandre Tharaud pianos; Philippe Bernold, flute; Ronald Van Spaendonck, clarinet; François Salque cello; Pierre Lénert, alto (1999, Arion) OCLC 717328000
- Est (Bartók, Popper...) - François Salque, cello; Vincent Peirani, accordion (1-3 July 2010, Zig-Zag Territoires ZZT 110101) OCLC 937793659
- Tanguillo (Astor Piazzolla, traditional) - François Salque, cello; Vincent Peirani, accordion; Tomás Gubitsch, guitar (Zig-Zag Territoires ZZT322) OCLC 893823630, 896890150

Videos

- Chopin et la mélodie, music lesson by Jean-François Zygel - direction Marie-Christine Gambart (2004, DVD Télescope audiovisuel/Naïve) OCLC 718136841
