= Thierry Escaich =

French organist and composer (born 1965)

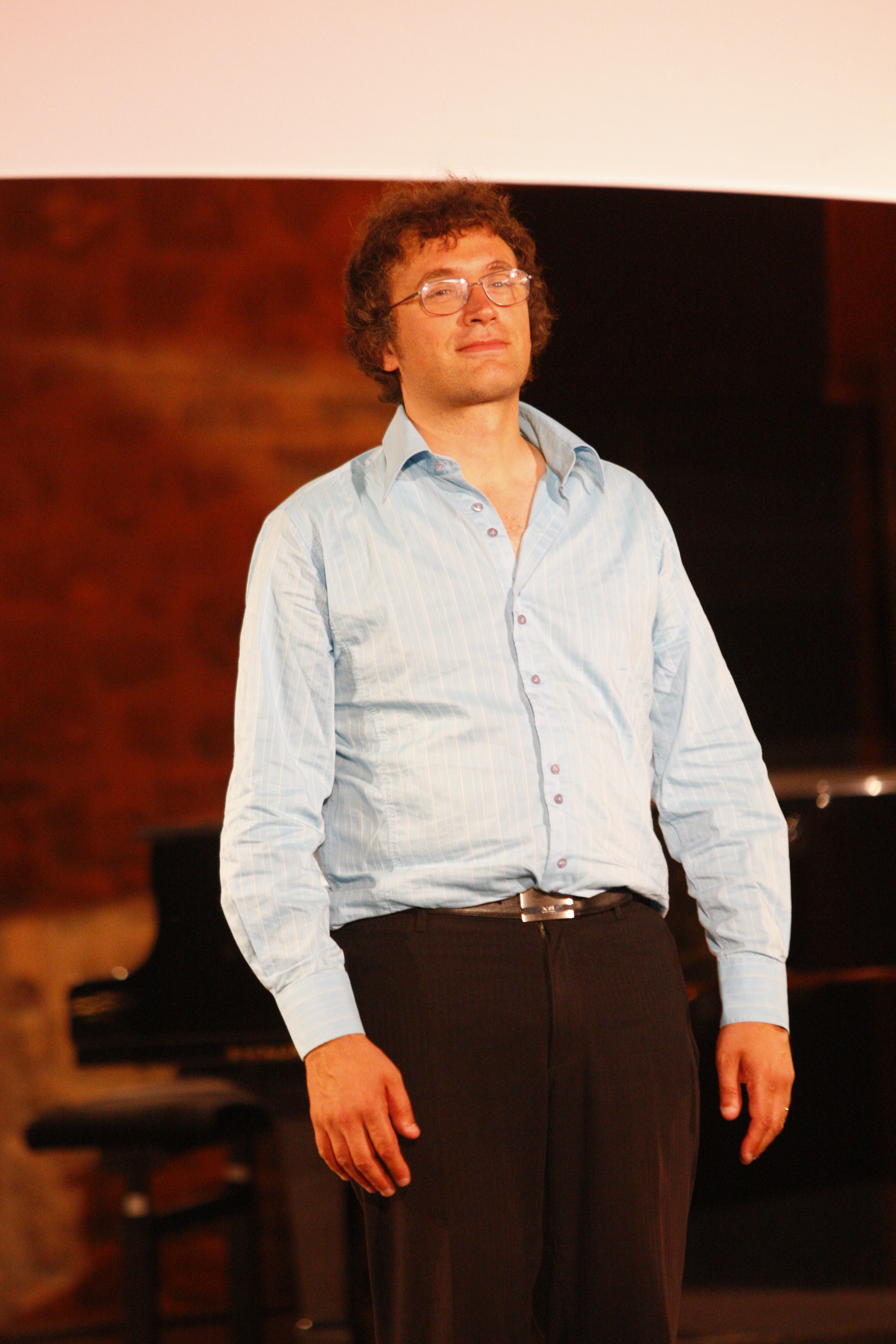
Thierry Escaich in 2009

Thierry Joseph-Louis Escaich (born 8 May 1965) is a French organist and composer.

== Life ==
Born in Nogent-sur-Marne, Escaich studied organ, improvisation and composition at the Conservatoire de Paris (CNSMDP), where he won eight First Prizes and where he has taught improvisation and composition since 1992.

Together with Vincent Warnier, he was appointed organist of Saint-Étienne-du-Mont church in Paris in 1996 (succeeding Maurice Duruflé). He tours internationally as a performing artist and composer.

His passion for the cinema has led him to improvise on the piano and the organ; he composed music for Frank Borzage's silent film Seventh Heaven, commissioned by the Louvre in 1999.

He has written more than one hundred works, and was awarded the Prix des Lycéens (2002), the Grand Prix de la Musique symphonique from the SACEM in 2004, and on three occasions, in 2003, 2006 and 2011, the French Victoires de la Musique Composer of the Year award.

Although he composes for the organ (solo pieces, chamber music, two concertos, La Barque solaire [The Sun Boat] for organ and orchestra), Escaich is open to all genres, forms and instruments (piano, saxophone...).

He wrote a ballet for the New York City Ballet, The Lost Dancer, which was world-premiered in New York City in May 2010 under the title Why am I not where you are (choreography by Benjamin Millepied, scenic designs by Santiago Calatrava).

After being composer in residence with the Orchestre national de Lille, the Orchestre de Bretagne and the Orchestre National de Lyon, he took up his position as associated composer with the Ensemble Orchestral de Paris in September 2011.

His music is performed by orchestras such as the Philadelphia Orchestra, the Berlin Konzerthaus Orchestra, the Mariinsky Theatre Orchestra or the Orchestre de Paris, by choirs such as Radio France Choir, the BBC Singers, Sequenza 9.3 and by musicians such as Christoph Eschenbach, Lothar Zagrosek, Jun Märkl, Claire-Marie Le Guay, Paul Meyer, Gautier and Renaud Capuçon, Olivier Latry, Iveta Apkalna, David Grimal, Nora Gubisch, John Mark Ainsley, the Trio Dali, the Trio Wanderer and the Quatuor Voce.

In 2024, he was appointed one of the head organists at Notre-Dame de Paris upon its reopening.

== Discography ==
- "Orgues d'Ile-de-France/Volume 1 Marie-Claire Alain at Saint-Germain-en-Laye Toccata (A. Alain) Deuils, Variations on a theme of C.J, Litanies (J.Alain) – Thierry Escaich at Mantes-la-Jolie Symphonie Improvisee sur le nom d'ALAIN (Prelude, Scherzo, Adgietto, Final), Laudes part 4 (Eben) Cinq versets sur Victimae Paschali (Escaich) Chamade CHCD5620 (19950
- Le Chemin de la Croix, improvisations (texts by Paul Claudel), Thierry Escaich (organ), Georges Wilson (speaker), recorded at Laon cathedral, Calliope, 2000.
- Trumpet & Organ: Bizet, Franck, Purcell, Bach, Mozart, Tomasi, Gounod, Spiritual, Christmas Medley. Éric Aubier (trumpet), Thierry Escaich (organ). Indésens/Sony Classical, 2000.
- Œuvres pour orgue et voix, Thierry Escaich (organ), Ensemble vocal Soli Tutti, Éric Aubier (trumpet), recorded at Saint-Étienne-du-Mont Church, Paris, Calliope, 2001.
- Concerto pour orgue – Première Symphonie – Fantaisie concertante, Olivier Latry (organ), Claire-Marie Le Guay (piano), Orchestre philharmonique de Liège, cond. Pascal Rophé. Accord/Universal, 2002. Diapason d'Or of the Year award.
- Le Dernier Evangile – Trois danses improvisées, Ensemble orchestral de Paris, Maîtrise de Notre-Dame de Paris, Choeur Britten, Olivier Latry (organ), cond. John Nelson, recorded at Notre-Dame de Paris. Éditions Hortus, 2002.
- Concerts au grand orgue de Saint-Étienne-du-Mont" Including live performances by Daniel Roth, Vincent Warnier and Marie-Claire Alain. Intrada 2004 (Mendelssohn Sonata No. 3, Andante & Scherzo Improvisés, Naïades (Louis Vierne) Improvisation sur un theme donné All performed by Thierry Escaich)
- Concerts au grand orgue de Saint-Étienne-du-Mont 2eme édition 2004–2005 Including live performances by Yves Castagnet, Marie-Claire Alain and Vincent Warnier. Thierry Escaich: Ouverture-Improvisation and Improvisation
- Exultet, vocal works, Ensemble Sequenza 9.3, cond. Catherine Simonpietri, Accord/Universal, 2006
- Miroir d'ombres, for violin, cello and orchestra [1] – Vertiges de la Croix [2] – Chaconne [3], Renaud Capuçon (violin), Gautier Capuçon (cello), Orchestre national de Lille, cond. Paul Polivnik [1], Michiyoshi Inoue [2], Jean-Claude Casadesus [3]. Label: Accord/Universal, 2007. Monde de la Musique magazine's Choc de l'année award.
- Organ Spectacular, improvisations à l'orgue (concert recordings), 2 CD Accord, 2008.
- Lettres mêlées autour de Thierry Escaich, chamber music: Bartók, Debussy, Martinu, Escaich (Lettres mêlées + Scènes d'enfants au crépuscule). Emmanuel Pahud (flute) – François Leleux (oboe) – Paul Meyer (clarinet) – Trio Wanderer. Label: Accord/Universal, 2009.
- Musique française pour instruments à vent, Quintette Aquilon: Escaich (Instants fugitifs), Tomasi, Ibert, Françaix. Label Premiers Horizons (distr. Codaex), 2009.
- Étranges étrangers – Guidoni chante Prévert, songs on poems by Jacques Prévert, sung by Jean Guidoni. Two songs by Thierry Escaich: Maintenant j'ai grandi and Elle disait. Label: Edito Musique, 2009.
- Tanz-Fantasie, French music for organ and trmpet. Eric Aubier (trumpet) and Thierry Escaich (organ, Saint-Étienne-du-Mont, Paris) – Escaich, Bacri, Tomasi, Jolivet, + 5 improvisations. Label Indésens (distr. Codaex) INDE012, 2009.
- Les Nuits hallucinées. La Barque solaire, Les Nuits hallucinées, Violin Concerto. Thierry Escaich (organ), Nora Gubisch (mezzo-soprano), David Grimal (violin), Orchestre national de Lyon, cond. Jun Märkl, Christian Arming. Accord/Universal, 2011. Classica magazine's Choc award.
- Concertos for Orchestra by Zhou Tian, Thierry Escaich & Sebastian Currier. Includes Escaich's Concerto for Orchestra (Symphony 2), recorded live, May 2016. Cincinnati Symphony Orchestra, cond. Louis Langrée. CSO Fanfare Cincinnati, 2016.
- Baroque Song. Baroque Song pour orchestre, Concerto pour clarinette et orchestre, Erinnerung, pour orchestre a cordes, Suite symphonique de "Claude". Paul Meyer (clarinet), Orchestre De L'Opera National de Lyon, cond. Alexandre Bloch. Sony Classical, 2017.
- Camille Saint-Saëns, Organ Symphony No. 3, Thierry Escaich, organ, Orchestre Philharmonique Royal de Liège, conducted by Jean-Jacques Kantorow. SACD Bis 2021. Diapason d'or

== Compositions ==
=== Symphonic music ===
- Symphony No. 1 (« Kyrie d'une messe imaginaire ») (1992)
- Chaconne for large orchestra (2000)
- Intrada (2003)
- Vertiges de la croix, symphonic poem (2004)
- Baroque Song, for small orchestra (2007)
- Symphonic Suite from the opera Claude (2014)
- Concerto for Orchestra (Symphony No. 2) (2015)

=== String orchestra ===
- Émergence (1988)
- Erinnerung (2009)
- Symphonic Prelude (2012)

=== Concertos ===
- Le Chant des ténèbres (1992) for soprano saxophone and strings
- Le Chant des ténèbres (1992) for soprano saxophone and 12 saxophones
- Organ Concerto No. 1, for organ and symphony orchestra (1995)
- Fantaisia concertante for piano and orchestra (1995)
- Elegy for trumpet and instrumental ensemble (1996)
- Résurgences, Concerto for trumpet and orchestra (2002)
- Miroir d'ombres (Mirror of Shadows), Double Concerto for violin, cello and orchestra (2006)
- Organ Concerto No. 2, for organ, string orchestra and two percussionists (2006)
- La Barque solaire, symphonic poem for orchestra and principal organ (2008)
- Le Chant des ténèbres, version for clarinet and strings (2008)
- Violin Concerto (2009)
- Fantastic Scherzo for two pianos and orchestra (2011)
- Clarinet Concerto (2012)
- Cello Concerto (2014)
- Concerto for violin, oboe and orchestra (2014)
- Organ Concerto No. 3 ("Quatre Visages du temps"), for organ and orchestra (2017)
- Le Nuit des Chants, Concerto for viola and orchestra (2018)
- Etudes symphoniques, Concerto for piano and orchestra (2023)

=== Solo organ ===
- Trois Esquisses (1990)
- Cinq Versets sur le « Victimæ paschali » (1991)
- Quatrième Esquisse (« Le Cri des abîmes ») (1993)
- Récit (1995)
- Deux Évocations (1996)
- Poèmes (2002)
- Agnus Dei (2003)
- Évocation III (2008)

==== Other solo instruments ====
- Les Litanies de l'ombre (1990) – piano
- Lutte (1994) – saxophone
- Jeux de doubles (2001) – piano
- Nun komm (2001) – violin
- Aria (2002) – piano
- Cantus I (2005) – cello
- Deux Études baroques (2009) – piano

=== Chamber music (2–6 instruments) ===
- Trois Intermezzi (1990) for flute, clarinet and saxophone
- Comme l'écho d'une fantaisie (1992) for 2 cornetts and organ (without pedal)
- Introït à l'Office des ténèbres (1992) for flute and blue harp (or piano)
- Psalmodie à l'Office des ténèbres (1992) for flute, blue harp and percussion
- Scènes d'enfants au crépuscule (1993) for flute, cello and piano
- Trio américain (« Suppliques ») (1994) pour clarinet, alto and piano
- Trois Instants fugitifs (1994) for flute, oboe, clarinet, horn and bassoon
- Variations gothiques (1996) for flute and string trio
- Nocturne (1997) for cello and piano
- Tanz-Fantasie (1997) for trumpet and piano
- Ground I (avant 1998) for accordion and euphonium
- Chorus (1998) for clarinet, string quartet and piano
- La Ronde (2000) for string quartet and piano
- Tanz-Fantasie (2000) for trumpet and organ
- Choral's Dream (2001) for piano and organ
- Scènes de bal (2001) for string quartet
- Spring's Dance (2001) for 2 pianos and percussion
- Le Bal (2003) for 4 saxophones
- Lettres mêlées (2003) for violin, cello and piano
- Après l'aurore (2005) for string quartet
- Una storia (2005) for violin, alto, cello, clarinet, percussions and piano
- Mechanic Song (2006) for wind quintet and piano
- Ground II (2007) for organ and percussions
- Ground III (2008) for 4 cellos
- Phantasia antiqua (2009) for 2 saxophones and piano

=== Ensemble (7 instruments and more) ===
- Antiennes oubliées (1989) for violin, cello, flute, saxophone in E b, trumpet, trombone and percussion
- Rhapsodie (1989) for clarinet, bassoon, cornet, trombone, violin, double bass and percussion.
- Magic Circus (2004) for wind octet
- Fanfare (2006) for brass ensemble

=== A cappella vocal and choral music ===
- Ad ultimas laudes (1993)
- Les Lamentations (du prophète Jérémie) (1998)
- Alléluias (2001)
- Dixit Dominus (2002)
- Sanctus (2007)
- Vocis cælestis (2009)

=== Vocal and choral music with instrument(s) ===
- Grande Messe solennelle (1994)
- Trois Motets (1998)
- Le Dernier Évangile (1999)
- D'une douleur muette (2001)
- Terra desolata (2001)
- In memoriam (2002)
- Visions nocturnes (2004) for mezzo-soprano, clarinet, string quartet and piano
- Exultet (2005)
- Feu vert (2005)
- Valse désarticulée (2008) for soprano and saxophone
- Les Nuits hallucinées (2008) for mezzo-soprano and orchestra
- Madre (2010) for soprano and piano
- Alléluias pro omni tempore (2010)
- Guernesey (2010), for tenor and piano (poems by Victor Hugo)
- Te Deum pour Notre-Dame (2025) for children's choir, two mixed choirs and orchestra

=== Stage works ===
- The Lost Dancer (2010), ballet
- Claude (2012/2013), libretto written by Robert Badinter
- Point-d'Orgue (2021), libretto written by Olivier Py

=== Songs ===
- "Elle disait..." (2008)
- "Maintenant, j'ai grandi" (2008)

=== Movies ===
- Seventh Heaven (1999), music for the silent movies by Frank Borzage for clarinet, violin, alto, cello, piano and percussions

=== Pedagogical works ===
- Choral varié (en hommage à Jean-Sébastien Bach) (1984) for junior orchestra
- Suite en forme de choral varié (1990) for junior orchestra
- Tango virtuoso (1991) for 4 saxophones
- Énigme (1992) for double bass and piano
- Huit Pièces (1993) for saxophone and piano
- Amélie's Dream (1997) for saxophone en mi b and piano
- Variations-Études (2002) for piano
- Tango virtuoso (2005) for 4 clarinets
- Sax Trip (2006) for alto saxophone and junior string orchestra
- Étude-Passacaille (2009) for piano

Preceded by Maurice Duruflé and Marie-Madeleine Duruflé-Chevalier	Organist, Saint-Étienne-du-Mont, Paris; 1996–	Succeeded by Incumbent
