= Paul Meyer (clarinetist) =

French clarinetist

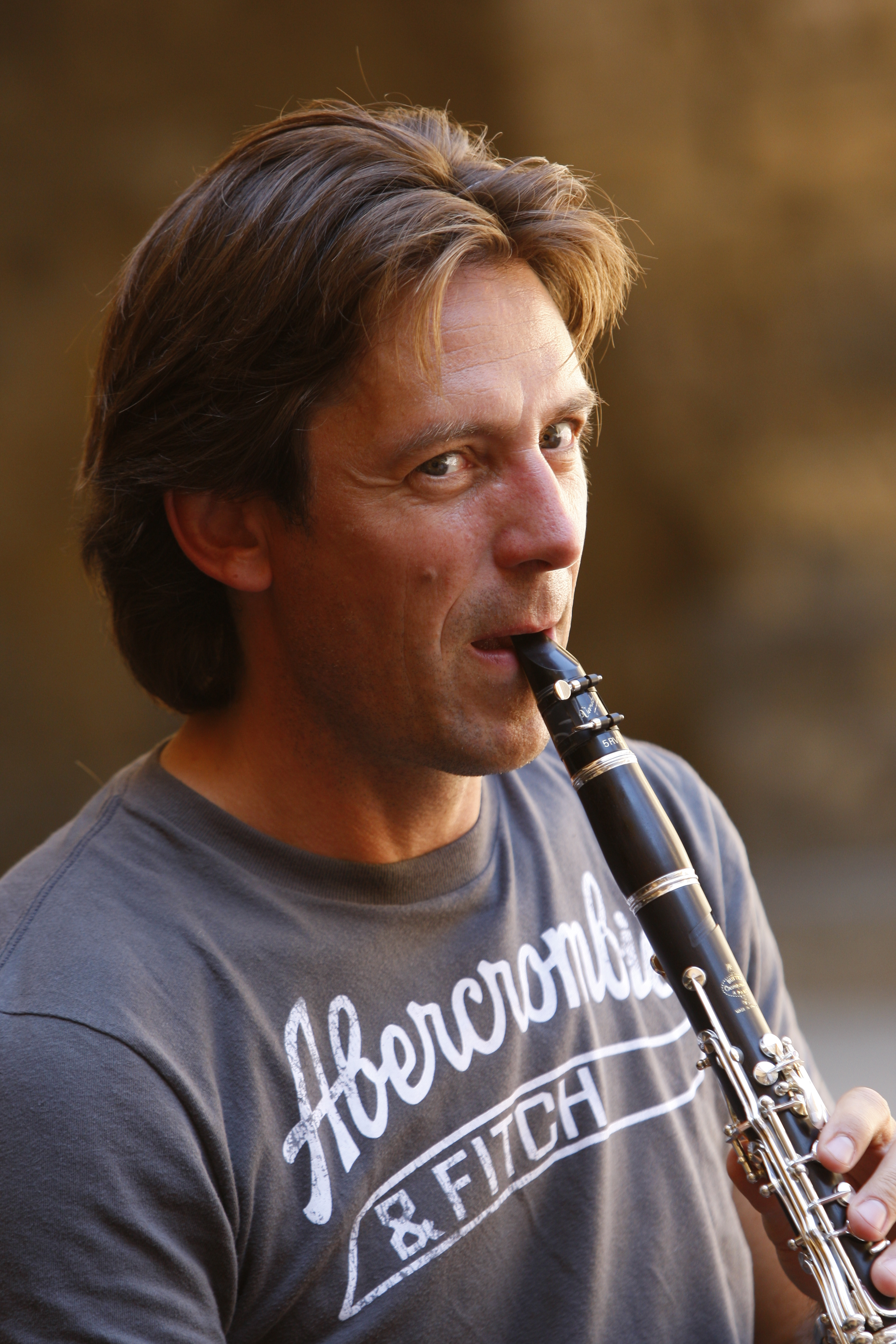
- Paul Meyer, 2009

Background information
- Born: 5 March 1965 (age 61); Mulhouse, France
- Genres: Contemporary, classical
- Occupations: Solo musician, conductor
- Instrument: Clarinet
- Formerly of: Seoul Philharmonic Orchestra; Copenhagen Philharmonic Orchestra; Tokyo Kosei Wind Orchestra

Paul Meyer (born 5 March 1965 in Mulhouse, France) is a French clarinetist.

Meyer is known for his solo recordings on the Denon label, notably in collaborations with Jean-Pierre Rampal and Éric Le Sage. He studied at the Paris Conservatoire and at the Basler Musikhochschule. In 1982, he won the French Young Musician's Competition and in 1984, the Young Concert Artists International Auditions.

A noted champion of new music for the clarinet, Meyer has given the world premieres of works by Gerd Kühr, Krzysztof Penderecki, Luciano Berio and Karol Beffa. He has also recorded some of the more obscure offerings of the traditional clarinet repertoire, including a 1990 collaboration with Gérard Caussé on works for viola and clarinet by Max Bruch for Erato, and a 1994 collaboration with Jean-Pierre Rampal on the two clarinet concertos of Ignaz Pleyel as well as the Sinfonia Concertante of Franz Danzi for Denon.

Conductors that Meyer has performed or recorded with include Emmanuel Krivine, Günther Herbig, Esa-Pekka Salonen, Yehudi Menuhin, Jerzy Maksymiuk, Kent Nagano, Ulf Schirmer, Heinrich Schiff, David Zinman, Michael Gielen and Luciano Berio. His chamber music partners have included Eric Le Sage (his regular duo partner), Jean-Pierre Rampal, Gérard Caussé, François-René Duchable, Maria João Pires, Pamela Frank, Yuri Bashmet, Gidon Kremer, Yo-Yo Ma, Mstislav Rostropovich, Vladimir Spivakov, Tabea Zimmermann, Heinrich Schiff, Barbara Hendricks, Natalie Dessay, Emmanuel Pahud, Myung-Whun Chung and Gil Shaham.

Meyer has also served as a conductor for many orchestras, including the Seoul Philharmonic Orchestra and Copenhagen Philharmonic Orchestra. Meyer also served as principal conductor of the Tokyo Kosei Wind Orchestra.

Paul Meyer plays on a Buffet Crampon Divine model clarinet.
