= Marina Chiche =

French violinist (born 1981)

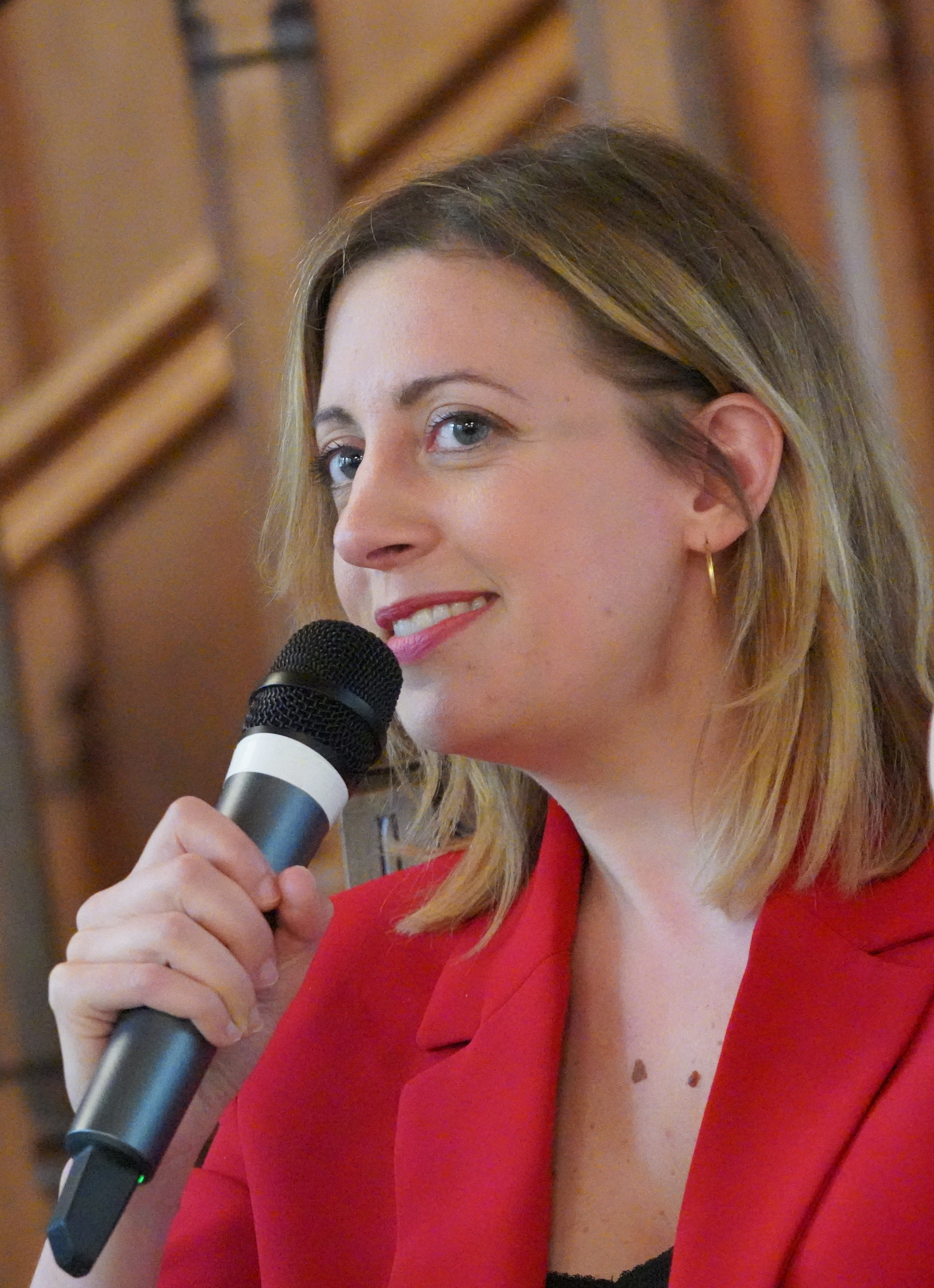

Background information
- Born: 10 November 1981 (age 44); Marseille, France
- Instrument: Violin

Marina Chiche (born 10 November 1981, in Marseille) is a French classical violinist.

== Biography and career ==
Marina Chiche was born in Marseilles in 1981. She started playing the violin at the age of 3.

=== Education and Training ===
Chiche studied at the Marseilles National Conservatory with Jean Ter-Merguerian. At the age of 16 she began studying at the National Conservatory of Music in Paris where she obtained four first prizes, in violin, chamber music (class of Pierre-Laurent Aimard), analysis and aesthetics. She continued honing her skills with Boris Kuschnir in Vienna, then with Ana Chumachenco at the University of Music and Performing Arts Munich, and Ferenc Rados in Budapest. She obtained a master's degree in Early music at the Berlin University of the Arts. Chiche took numerous master classes with renowned musicians such as Joseph Silverstein, Ida Haendel, Gerhard Schulz and György Kurtag. In 2016, she received a doctorate degree in "aesthetics, theory and practice of the arts" at the University of Lille.

=== Performances and recordings ===
In 2003, she recorded her debut: the complete sonatas of Brahms with pianist Vahan Mardirossian, which was met with generally positive reviews from music critics. Chiche participated in the recording of Éric Tanguy's "Chamber Music" for the Transart Live label. In 2008, she recorded the solo album After reading Bach, which included an eponymous composition by Karol Beffa, as well as pieces by Bach, Prokofiev and Ysaÿe.

Chiche has performed all over the world as a soloist with orchestra, in recital as well as in chamber music. As a soloist she played with orchestras such as Sinfonia Varsovia, Ensemble Orchestral de Paris, Orchestre National de Lille, Orchestre National de Bretagne, Orchestre symphonique de Mulhouse and the Orchestra Ensemble Kanazawa. She also performed alongside Joseph Silverstein, Gérard Caussé, Renaud and Gautier Capuçon, Marc Coppey, Jérôme Pernoo, Vladimir Mendelssohn, Jonathan Gilad, Pierre-Laurent Aimard, Augustin Dumay, Florent Boffard, Anssi Karttunen, Magnus Lindberg, and Chen Halevi.

Since 2013, she regularly plays in a duo with pianist Abdel Rahman El Bacha, in which both play by heart.

In 2014, Chiche performed Vivaldi's Four Seasons in La Folle Journée held in Tokyo.

In 2020 she recorded the album Post-scriptum in duet with the pianist Aurélien Pontier, which received excellent reviews, including a 5 stars review from Classica.

Marina Chiche plays a Neapolitan violin by Giuseppe Gagliano from 1762. Since 2020 she also plays a violin by Giovanni Battista Guadagnini from 1784, on loan from the Zilber-Vatelot-Rampal association.

=== Teaching ===
In 2009 and 2010, Chiche was a visiting professor at the National Taiwan University of Arts in Taipei. From 2013 to 2018, she taught violin and chamber music at the Trossingen University of Music in Trossingen in Baden-Württemberg, Germany, where she headed the strings department. Since her return to Paris, she gives seminars on music at Sciences Po.

=== Media and writing ===
Chiche writes about the backstage of the life of a musician in her blog "Everything you always wanted to know about the life of a professional musician". She also regularly publishes articles about music in magazines, and produces programs for France Musique at Radio France. In 2021 she produced a series of podcasts about pioneering female musicians. In October that year she published the book Musiciennes de légende. De l'ombre à la lumière ("Legendary female musicians, from shadow to light"), which depicts portraits of 30 known and lesser-known 19th and 20th century musicians.

== Discography ==
- 2020 : Post-scriptum - 18 miniatures pour violon. Hommage à Jascha Heifetz & Kreisler. Avec Aurélien Pontier, piano. Label NoMadMusic. Choix de France Musique.
- 2015 : Hermann Götz – Piano Quartet / Piano Quintet avec Oliver Triendl, Peijun Xu, Niklas Schmidt, Matthias Beltinger. Label TYXart.
- 2009: CD live: Granados-Kreisler, Ponce, Piazzolla.
- 2008: Intrada. CD Après une lecture de J. S. Bach. Recital for solo violin.
- 2007: CD live. Saint-Saëns, Sarasate, Massenet with the French Republican Guard Band.
- 2007: CD autour de l'exposition Lalique; Musée du Luxembourg. Debussy, Kreisler.
- 2004: DVD Victoires de la Musique with the Orchestre de Paris.
- 2004: Transart live. Musique de chambre d'Eric Tanguy.
- 2003: CD Victoires de la Musique.
- 2003: Intrada. CD complete Brahms violin and piano with Vahan Mardirossian.
- 2003: Culturesfrance. CD series "Déclic".
