= Pascal Dumay =

French classical pianist (born 1951)

- Born: 1 November 1951 (age 75); Neuilly-sur-Seine, France
- Genre: Classical
- Occupations: Pianist; Arts administrator
- Instrument: Piano

Pascal Dumay (born 1 November 1951) is a French classical pianist who has held various positions of responsibility in the musical field in France.

He is the brother of violinist Augustin Dumay.

== Career ==
Born in Neuilly-sur-Seine, after graduating from the Conservatoire de Paris, Dumay began a career as a pianist, which led him to perform in various European countries, as a soloist and chamber musician. He has played and recorded for radio, television and recordings with violinists Raphaël Oleg and Augustin Dumay.

- 1985–1990: He moved away from the keyboard and took over the direction of the Académie-Festival des Arcs (Savoie), founded by Roger Godino, the creator of the station Les Arcs, and by Yves Petit-de-Voize, festival director and then editor of the musical magazine Diapason. Dumay thus contributed to the meeting, in Les Arcs, of a large number of musicians through chamber music concerts and a summer music academy bringing together teachers and trainees. His successors at the direction of the Académie-Festival des Arcs, in 1990, were the French pianist Michel Dalberto and the American clarinettist Bernard Yannotta.
- 1988–1993: He was appointed general manager of the Festival d'Île-de-France. This festival, funded by the Île-de-France Regional Council, the Regional Directorate of Cultural Affairs and several regional councils in the region, aimed to highlight the region's architectural heritage and promote the dissemination of music in small and medium-sized municipalities in the Île-de-France region. The festival's program was divided between classical music and jazz.
- 1989–1993: Dumay was at the initiative of the "Campus à l'Oreille" festival, which took place in a dozen universities and grandes écoles in Île-de-France and was funded by the Regional Council. In each university or college, this festival was co-organized with a student association and gave rise to three days of concerts and an "off" festival. It continues throughout the rest of the year with concerts and amateur music practice activities. The programming is divided between classical music, jazz, world music and rock.
- 1990–1993: He is at the initiative of the Rencontres Musicales de Villarceaux, financed by the Île-de-France Regional Council. The objective is to bring together young soloists and great artists, sharing moments of work in the Domaine of Villarceaux, in the Vexin. In Villarceaux, musicians such as pianists Frank Braley, Nicholas Angelich, cellists Marc Coppey, Anne Gastinel, Henri Demarquette, Xavier Phillips met pianist Maria João Pires and cellists Paul Tortelier and János Starker.
- 1993–1996: He joined Warner Classics as artistic director of the Erato Records label, succeeding Michel Garcin. He is notably at the initiative of the arrival within Erato of the Les Arts florissants ensemble and William Christie, the pianists Hélène Grimaud and Till Fellner, of the medieval music ensembleMala Punica. His successor at Erato was Martin Sauer, who a few years later became President of the Teldec label.
- 1995–2000: The Ministry of Culture and Communication appoints him President of the Orchestre français des jeunes (OFJ). This orchestra, founded by Maurice Fleuret in 1982, brings together each year about a hundred young musicians who wish to experience the work of the orchestra, under the direction of renowned conductors. During this period, the OFJ was led by Marek Janowski and Emmanuel Krivine among others.
- 1996–2000: Michel Boyon, then président of Radio France, appointed him director of music in the Maison de la Radio. He was responsible for both France Musique, the musical programme of France Culture, the Orchestre national de France, the Orchestre philharmonique de Radio France, the choir and the Maîtrise de Radio France, the Radio France concert season and the Présences festival. In particular, he was responsible for the appointment of Kurt Masur as conductor of the Orchestre national de France. René Koering succeeded him as music director at Radio France.
- 2000–2009: He was appointed music advisor at the Ministry of Culture and Communication, within the direction de la musique, de la danse, du théâtre et des spectacles (DMDTS). He worked successively with Sylvie Hubac, Jérôme Bouët and Jean de Saint-Guilhem. In 2005, he was appointed music delegate to Jean de Saint-Guilhem, then to Georges-François Hirsch within the DMDTS, which later became the Direction générale de la création artistique (DGCA).

In September 2009 he was appointed by decree director of the Conservatoire de Paris (CNSMDP), whose Board of Directors was chaired by Rémy Pflimlin. He began a reform of the CNSMDP; but due to a judicial challenge, he had to leave his position a few months later and was replaced by the composer Bruno Mantovani.

== Training ==
Dumay entered the Conservatoire de Paris in the pianist Pierre Sancan's class when he was 12 years old. He also worked with Jean Hubeau, Geneviève Joy, Gabriel Tacchino, Sylvaine Billier, Christian Manen, Betsy Jolas and Alain Bernaud. During the development cycle, he worked with Dimitri Bashkirov, Paul Badura-Skoda and György Sebők. After the conservatory, he continued his training with pianist Jean-Bernard Pommier, and had the opportunity to work with Arthur Grumiaux and Claudio Arrau

Preceded by Alain Poirier	director of the Conservatoire de Paris; 2009–2010	Succeeded by Bruno Mantovani
