= Dumay =

Dumay may refer to:

== Surname ==
- Antoine Dumay (XV century), French physician
- Augustin Dumay (born 1949), French violinist and conductor
- Bruno Dumay (born 1960), French rower
- Jean-Baptiste Dumay (1841-1926), French politician
- Jean-Michel Dumay (born 1961), French journalist
- Pascal Dumay (born 1951), French classical pianist
- Pierre Dumay (1928-2021), French racing driver
- Raymond Dumay (1916-1999), French writer

== Other uses ==
- Hôtel Dumay, French historic building in Toulouse
