= Renaud Capuçon =

French violinist

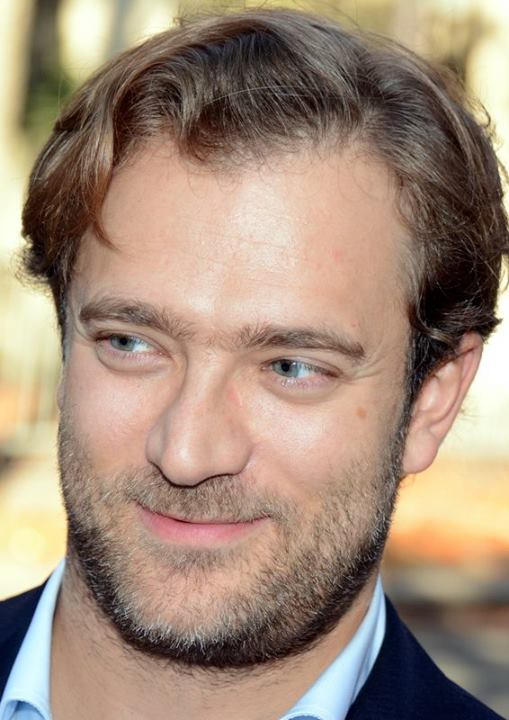
- Renaud Capuçon in 2013
- Born: 27 January 1976 (age 50); Chambéry, France
- Occupations: Classical violinist; Academic teacher
- Spouse: Laurence Ferrari
- Children: 1
- Relatives: Gautier Capuçon (brother)

Renaud Capuçon (born 27 January 1976) is a French classical violinist. Since late 2016 he has been teaching at the Royal Northern College of Music. He is the older brother of cellist Gautier Capuçon.

== Biography ==
Capuçon was born in Chambéry on 27 January 1976. He entered the Chambéry Conservatoire at the age of 4, and then the Conservatoire national supérieur de musique et de danse de Paris (CNSMDP) at the age of 14 where he studied under Gérard Poulet and Veda Reynolds. Three years later he completed his studies there, winning first prize in both chamber music and violin.

Capuçon then entered several international competitions and joined the European Union Youth Orchestra, and then the Gustav Mahler Youth Orchestra as first violin under the direction of Claudio Abbado.

At the same time Capuçon launched his career as a soloist and chamber musician, playing with Nicholas Angelich, Jérôme Ducros, Frank Braley, Hélène Grimaud, Gérard Caussé, as well as with his younger brother Gautier, a cellist.

In 1996, Capuçon founded an annual festival at La Ravoire near Chambéry, the Rencontres artistiques de Bel-Air, which ended in 2010. It welcomed the most important chamber players including Jean-Pierre Wallez, Michel Dalberto, Martha Argerich, Stephen Kovacevich, Augustin Dumay, Gérard Caussé, Paul Meyer, Emmanuel Pahud, Katia and Marielle Labèque.

In 2013 Capuçon began directing an Easter festival in Aix-en-Provence.

Capuçon has recorded chamber works of Ravel, Schubert, Brahms, as well concertos for violin by Schumann and Mendelssohn under the direction of Daniel Harding.

After playing a Vuillaume, a Guadagnini and then a Stradivarius, in 2005 the Banque de Suisse Italienne BSI loaned Capuçon a Guarnerius, the "Panette" of 1737 that had belonged to Isaac Stern.

The prizes Capuçon has won include the 1992 first in chamber music and 1993 first in violin at CNSMD de Paris, then in 1995, the prize of the Berlin Academy of Arts. In 2000, he was named talent of the year by Victoires de la musique classique, which in 2005 awarded him the title "instrumental soloist of the year". In 2006 he received the Georges Enescu violin prize from the Société des auteurs, compositeurs et éditeurs de musique.

On 25 May 2009, Capuçon participated in the film 7.57 am-pm directed by Simon Lelouch, in which he performed the Melody of Orpheus by Gluck on his Guarnerius in the middle of a crowd of commuters on Line 6 of the Paris Métro, unrecognized and unremarked by the passing crowd.

In June 2011, Capuçon was appointed Chevalier of the National Order of Merit by the French government and 'Chevalier de la Légion d'honneur' in March 2016.

Capuçon has worked with contemporary composers such as Nicolas Bacri (solo violin sonata, 1999), Karol Beffa (duet for violin and cello Masques, concerto for violin, string quartet Mosaïques), Pascal Dusapin (concerto for violin - Aufgang), Bruno Mantovani (concerto for violin - Jeux d'eau, 2012) and Wolfgang Rihm (concerto for violin - Gedicht des Malers, 2015).

On 4 January 2019, Capuçon performed a concert during "Winter at Tantora" music carnival running at Al-'Ula, a UNESCO World Heritage Site in northwestern Saudi Arabia.

On 10 April 2020, during the coronavirus lockdown, Capuçon was one of a handful of people to take part in a Good Friday service led by Michel Aupetit, Archbishop of Paris, in the Cathedral of Notre-Dame de Paris, which was still being rebuilt after the Notre-Dame de Paris fire a year earlier. All wore protective clothing. Capuçon provided the sole musical accompaniment.

In 2020, Capuçon was named UNESCO Artist for peace.

== Personal life ==
Capuçon has been in a relationship with journalist Laurence Ferrari since 2008 and they married on 3 July 2009. The couple have one child together. His brother is the cellist Gautier Capuçon.

== Discography ==
- Franz Schubert: Grand duo, Rondo brillant, Fantaisie. With Jérôme Ducros. CD Virgin Classics, 1999
- ’Le Bœuf sur le toit’, French pieces for violin and orchestra by Saint-Saëns, Massenet, Ravel, Berlioz, Milhaud. With the Deutsche Kammerphilharmonie, Bremen et Daniel Harding. Virgin Classics, 2001
- Henri Dutilleux: Concerto pour violon L’arbre des songes. With the Orchestre Philharmonique de Radio France and Myung-Whun Chung. Virgin Classics, 2002
- Maurice Ravel : Trio avec piano, Sonate pour violon et piano, Sonate pour violon et violoncelle, ‘Sonate posthume’. With Gautier Capuçon, Frank Braley. Virgin Classics, 2002
- ’Face à face’, Duos for violin and cello by Kodály, Schulhoff, Haendel, Tanguy…. With Gautier Capuçon. Virgin Classics, 2003
- Ludwig van Beethoven: Triple concerto for violin, cello and piano. With Martha Argerich, Mischa Maisky, Orchestra della Svizzera Italiana, Alexandre Rabinovitch. EMI Classics, 2004
- Johannes Brahms: The Trios for piano, violin and cello. With Gautier Capuçon, Nicholas Angelich. 2CD Virgin Classics, 2004
- Felix Mendelssohn: Concerto for violon n°2, Schumann: Concerto for violin. AWith the Mahler Chamber Orchestra and Daniel Harding. Virgin Classics, 2004
- Camille Saint-Saëns: The Carnival of the Animals, Septet, Fantaisie for violin et harp. With Emmanuel Pahud, Gautier Capuçon, Paul Meyer, Esther Hoppe, Michel Dalberto, Frank Braley, Béatrice Muthelet, David Guerrier, Janne Saksala, Florent Jodelet, Marie-Pierre Langlamet. Virgin Classics, 2004
- Franz Schubert: Quintet for piano and strings The Trout, Variations on ‘Trockne Blumen’. With Gautier Capuçon, Gérard Caussé, Aloïs Posch, Frank Braley. CD Virgin Classics, 2004
- Johannes Brahms : The Sonatas for violin and piano, Scherzo from the Sonata FAE. With Nicholas Angelich. Virgin Classics, 2005
- ’Inventions’, Duos for violin and cello by Bach, Eisler, Karol Beffa, Bartók, Klein, Kreisle... With Gautier Capuçon. Virgin Classics, 2006
- Johannes Brahms: Double concerto for violin and cello, Quintet for clarinet and strings. With Gautier Capuçon, Gustav Mahler Youth Orchestra and Myung-Whun Chung, Paul Meyer, Capuçon Quartet. Virgin Classics, 2007
- Franz Schubert : Trios for piano, violin and cello, Sonatensatz, Notturno. With Gautier Capuçon, Frank Braley. 2CD Virgin Classics, 2007
- Johannes Brahms: Quartet for piano and strings. With Gautier Capuçon, Gérard Caussé, Nicholas Angelich. 2CD Virgin Classics, 2008
- ’Capricio’, 21 virtuoso pieces for violin. With Jérôme Ducros. Virgin Classics, 2008
- Ludwig van Beethoven and Erich Korngold: Concertos for violin. With l’Orchestre Philharmonique de Rotterdam and Yannick Nézet-Séguin. Virgin Classics, 2009
- Wolfgang Amadeus Mozart: Concertos for violon 1 and 3, Symphonie concertante. With Antoine Tamestit, Scottish Chamber Orchestra and Louis Langrée. Virgin Classics, 2009
- Ludwig van Beethoven: Sonatas for violin and piano. With Frank Braley. 3CD Virgin Classics, 2011
- Gabriel Fauré: Chamber music for instruments with strings and piano. With Gautier Capuçon, Gérard Caussé, Quatuor Ebène, Nicholas Angelich, Michel Dalberto. 5CD Virgin Classics, 2011
- Johannes Brahms and Alban Berg: Concertos for violin. With the Vienna Philharmonic and Daniel Harding. CD Virgin Classics, 2012
- Camille Saint-Saëns, Violin Concerto n°3, Renaud Capuçon, violin, Orchestre Philharmonique de Radio France, conductor Lionel Bringuier. CD Erato 2013
- Karol Beffa: Le Roi qui n'aimait pas la musique. With Edgar Moreau, Paul Meyer and Karol Beffa. Book-CD Galliamrd jeunesse, 2017
- Béla Bartók: Violin Concertos Nos.1 & 2. With the London Symphony Orchestra, conductor François-Xavier Roth. CD Erato 2018
