= Henri Demarquette =

French cellist

Henri Demarquette (born 1970) is a French contemporary classical cellist.

== Life ==
"An enthusiastic musician with a multi-faceted personality, Henri Demarquette plays the cello as if setting a deep forest ablaze; not a single stroke of his bow leaves the listener indifferent because he awakens music's subconscious". O.Bellamy (Le Monde de la musique).

Born in 1970, Demarquette entered at the age of 13 the Conservatoire de Paris where he studied with Philippe Muller and Maurice Gendron. He was unanimously awarded a Premier Prix, and worked with Pierre Fournier and Paul Tortelier before taking lessons from Janos Starker in Bloomington, USA.

Familiar with the stage by the time he was fourteen, Demarquette made his concert debut at seventeen with a recital at the Théâtre du Châtelet in Paris and a recording for France 3 Television with pianist Hélène Grimaud. He caught the attention of Lord Yehudi Menuhin, who invited him to play Dvorák's Concerto in Prague and Paris with Menuhin conducting.

His career has been international ever since, taking him to many capitals in the company of the greatest French and international orchestras – most recently the Orchestre national de France, the London Philharmonic, the Vienna Chamber Orchestra, the Paris Orchestral Ensemble, the Tokyo Symphony, the Bordeaux-Aquitaine National Orchestra, the Symphonia Varsovia, the Neue Philharmonie Westphalen, the Orchestre de chambre de Paris.

Demarquette has also appeared with his favourite chamber music partners Boris Berezovski, Michel Dalberto, Jean-Bernard Pommier, Fabrizio Chiovetta, Vanessa Benelli Mosell and Jean-Frédéric Neuburger.

In 2006, on the occasion of composer Henri Dutilleux's 90th birthday, his interpretation of the concerto Tout un monde lointain, with the Nationaltheater Mannheim (NTM) orchestra directed by Frédéric Chaslin, gave rise to a film aired on Mezzo TV.

In 2011 and 2012, he performed with Saint Petersburg Philharmonic Orchestra, Ural Philharmonic Orchestra, NDR Hanover, Orchestre National de Lille, Orchestre Français des Jeunes, Orchestre Philharmonique de Marseille... He also plays at Théâtre des Champs Elysées with Brigitte Engerer, at the Salle Pleyel with Vadim Repin, at the Berlin Philharmonie, the Salle Gaveau, and the Tokyo International Forum...

He has created works by contemporary composers such as Olivier Greif (Durch Adams Fall), Pascal Zavaro (concerto), Éric Tanguy (Nocturne), Florentine Mulsant (sonata), Alexandre Gasparov (Nocturne), Christian Lauba, his New York Concerto with Jonas Vitaud, piano and Richard Ducros, saxophone...

Henri Demarquette also performs an eclectic program from Bach to Galliano, in duo with the French accordionist Richard Galliano. In 2014, the duo created “Contrastes” for accordion, cello and orchestra, a composition by Richard Galliano.

In 2015, he founded a string quartet with Augustin Dumay, Svetlin Roussev, and Miguel da Silva.

Michel Legrand dedicated a concert to Demarquette who performed it for the first time with the Orchestre Philarmonique de Radio France conducted by Mikko Franck and recorded by Sony Music.

H.Demarquette created Vocello, an original ensemble for cello and choir a capella together with L'Ensemble Vocal Sequenza 9.3. Their program includes Renaissance pieces in relation with contemporary music. In 2016, Vocello stayed as artist in residence at Collège des Bernardins.

Since 2012, H.Demarquette is regularly invited by Michel Onfray to take part in the original project called Université populaire de Caen, together with an essayist, a poet, and a musician called Jean-Yves Clément.

In 2005, he received an award from the Simone and Cino Del Duca Foundation.

Henri Demarquette plays the "le Vaslin" cello made by Antonio Stradivari in 1725, lent by LVMH/ Moët Henessy. Louis Vuitton with a Persoit bow dated 1820.

== Selected discography ==
- Beethoven's Trios for piano, clarinet and cello Op.11 and Op.38 with Jérôme Ducros, Florent Héau (Harmonia Mundi / Zig-Zag Territoires, 2005)
- Johannes Brahms: 3 sonatas for cello and piano, with Michel Dalberto (Warner, 2008)
- Frédéric Chopin: The work for cello and piano with Brigitte Engerer (2003)
- Olivier Greif: Par la chute d'Adam (cello concerto) with the Orchestre national de France, dir. Jean-Claude Casadesus; Sonate de requiem for cello and piano with Giovanni Bellucci (Universal, 2010)
- Camille Saint-Saëns: Cello concerto nº 1, Sonata for cello and piano nº 1, Romance for cello and piano, Le Carnaval des Animaux with Boris Berezovsky, Brigitte Engerer and the Ensemble orchestral de Paris, dir. Joseph Swensen
- L'Invitation au voyage (French music) with Brigitte Engerer (Warner, 2007)
- Le violoncelle romantique (works by Weber, Grieg, Offenbach, Chopin, Liszt, Dvorak, Rachmaninov…) with François-Frédéric Guy (Pierre Verany 1995)
- Michel Legrand: Cello concerto with the Orchestre Philharmonique de Radio France, dir. Mikko Franck (Sony, 2017)
- Vocello (works by Purcell, Tavener, Ockeghem, Tanguy, Dowland, Escaich, Clemens non papa, Hersant, Janulyte) with the Ensemble vocal Sequenza 9.3, dir. Catherine Simonpietri (Decca, 2017)
- Joseph Jongen: works for cello and orchestra - Henri Demarquette (cello), Christian Arming (conductor), Orchestre Philharmonique de Liège (interpret) CD album published 28 April 2017
- French music box: Henri Demarquette (cello), Gabriel Fauré, Jean Cras, Guy Ropartz CD album published 24 April 2017
