= Éliane Reyes =

Belgian classical pianist

Eliane Reyes
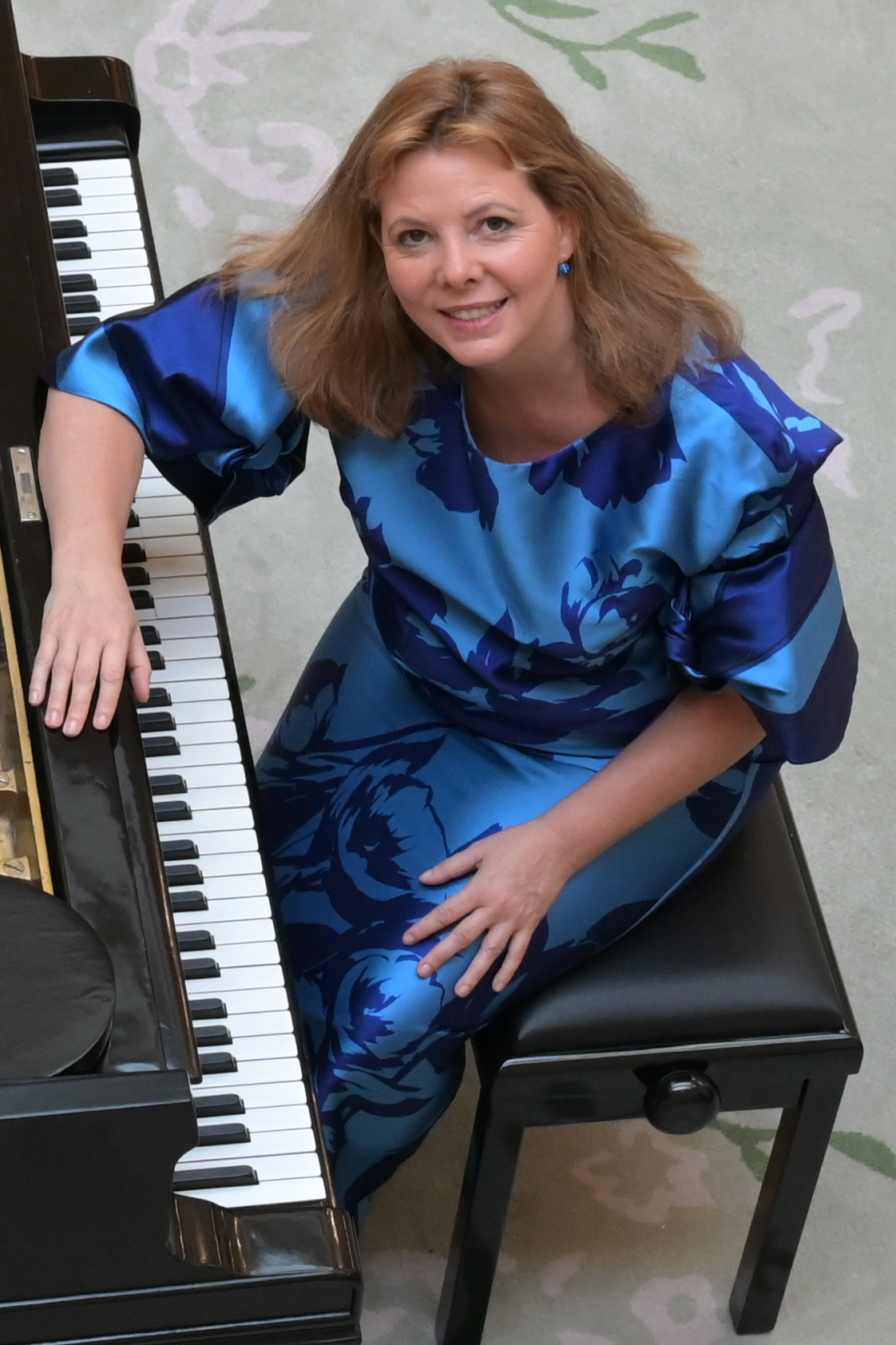
- Born: June 7, 1977; Verviers
- Website: Official website

Éliane Reyes (born 7 June 1977 in Verviers) is a Belgian pianist who is known both as a soloist and as a chamber musician. She is also currently Professor of Piano at both the Conservatoire royal de Bruxelles (Royal Conservatory of Brussels, Belgium) and the Conservatoire de Paris. In 2016, she was designated a Knight of the Ordre des Arts et des Lettres, by the French government.

== Life ==
Reyes, a piano prodigy, began performing at a very early age. In 1988, she was an award winner of the Cziffra Foundation (Senlis, France) and the same year she performed at the Tibor Varga Festival (Sion, Switzerland) and also with the Royal Concertgebouw Orchestra in Amsterdam, conducted by Sergiu Comissiona.

== Studies ==
First trained by her mother, she then went to the Royal Conservatory of Brussels. This was followed by the prestigious Queen Elisabeth Music Chapel in Jean-Claude Vanden Eynden’s class. From there she went to the Hochschule der Künste in Berlin, to the Mozarteum in Salzburg with Hans Leygraf, the Lemmensinstituut with Alan Weiss and thereafter to the Conservatoire National Supérieur de Musique in Paris under the aegis of Michel Beroff, Brigitte Engerer and Jacques Rouvier. During her training, Ms Reyes also attended numerous master classes with Martha Argerich, Vladimir Ashkenazy, Paul Badura-Skoda, Murray Perahia, Abdel Rahman El Bacha, György Sebők, Michel Beroff, Brigitte Engerer and Vitaly Margulis. Upon completion of her studies, she was appointed professor of complementary piano at the Conservatoire National Supérieur de Musique de Paris (CNSM).

== Career ==
In the spectrum of international competitions, Eliane has won several awards, including 1st prize in Ettlingen, Germany and 1st prize at the Cervantes International Piano Competition in Cuba. She was a finalist at the Montreal International Musical Competition, the Clara Schumann International Piano Competition in Düsseldorf, where she was equally rewarded for chamber music, abd the Maria Canals International Music Competition. Eliane Reyes has also been nominated three times for the International Classical Music Awards. Through her numerous performances, she has won the support of the Rheinold Blüthner, Solti and Vocatio Foundations. Amongst artists such as Martha Argerich and Vladimir Ashkenazy, Eliane Reyes has had the opportunity to be invited to give recitals and to perform alongside Augustin Dumay, Ivry Gitlis, Mischa Maisky and José van Dam. She currently devotes herself to a career as a recitalist, soloist and chamber musician, winning acclaim from the international press and audiences.

== Repertoire ==
Eliane Reyes has a predilection for French composers and contemporary music. Her discography consists of works by Nicolas Bacri, F. Chopin, C. Debussy, Benjamin Godard, F. Liszt, Michel Lysight, Darius Milhaud, Maurice Ravel, Alexander Tansman, as a consequence she obtained many awards such as "Pianiste Maestro" by the French magazine Pianiste, "Ring" by Classic Info, "Joker" by Crescendo Magazine and a "Supersonic" award from Pizzicat and notably from ResMusica, where she was awarded "La Clef d'or" for her solo recording of the 24 Intermezzi by A. Tansman.

== Tributes ==
A number of very prominent figures of the music world think highly of her. These include Vladimir Ashkenazy, who upon hearing her at a very young age declared: "For many years no one has impressed me as much as this young pianist," as well as Martha Argerich, "A wonderful talent for music" and Tibor Varga, who after conducting her in a Joseph Haydn concerto at the age of 10 had this to say about her performance: "... touching, deeply moving, unforgettable."

== Awards and other distinctions ==
- 1995: Together with Marie Hallynck wins a medal at the Maria Canals chamber music Competition.
- 1996: Unanimously awarded a first prize and a special prize for the best artistic interpretation at the Ettlingen International Competition.
- 1997: Finalist of the Clara Schumann Competition in Düsseldorf.
- 2002: Receives an award from the Georg Solti Foundation.
- 2003: Winner of the Fondation Belge de la Vocation.
- 2004: Finalist of the Montreal International Music Competition (Canada).
- 2005: Bluthner Foundation laureate.
- 2005: Wins the Julio Cervantes International Competition in Cuba (Havana).
- 2010: Receives an Octave de la Musique, a distinction awarded by a jury of one hundred people from the press, media, and the Belgian world of music for her entire career.
- 2016: Eliane Reyes is the first Belgian pianist to receive the insignia of Chevalier de l'Ordre des Arts et des Lettres from the French government.
- 2017: Documentary produced by RTBF (Belgian television) on the life of Eliane Reyes to date
- 2017: Eliane Reyes is one of the commentators on a film about the life of Clara Haskil.
- 2017: Together with the French philosopher, Michel Onfray, she participates in a concert-lecture presentation during the "Les inattendus" festival in Tournai, Belgium
- 2018: Eliane Reyes is invited to participate in the prestigious "Folle Journée" festival in Nantes, France, where she plays a selection of pieces by Chopin.

== Recordings ==
Eliane Reyes recordings include works by Alexandre Tansman, Darius Milhaud, Claude Debussy, Nicolas Bacri, Michael Lysight, Benjamin Godard and Jean-Marie Simonis, which have appeared under the Naxos, Fuga Libera, Pavane, Dux, Grand Piano and Kalidisc labels. They include live and studio recordings. Her recordings have received a number of rewards: 4 stars from “Classica 5 Diapasons” (twice) awarded by the French music magazine Diapasons, an Award Recomendado from the Spanish music magazine, CD Compact and a Clef ResMusica by the prestigious online French music magazine ResMusica for her CD of the 24 Intermezzi by Alexandre Tansman (2011).

- Frédéric Chopin: The complete Waltzes (AZUR)
- Brahms - Bargiel - Brüll : Sonatas for two Pianos. With Jean-Claude Vanden Eynden (AZUR)
- Benjamin Godard: Piano Works. In two volumes (GRAND PIANO)
- Ravel - Debussy - Chopin : Jeux d'eau (AZUR)
- Alexander Tansman : Piano Music (NAXOS)
- Alexander Tansman : 24 Intermezzi et the small suite (NAXOS)
- Alexander Tansman : Chamber Music with Clarinet (NAXOS)
- Nicolas Bacri : Piano Music (NAXOS)
- Darius Milhaud : Suite for Clarinet, Violon and Piano. With other musicians (NAXOS)
- Michael Lysight : "Enigma". With other musicians (DUX)
- Other works : the full list may be found in Eliane Reyes' official website (see below)
