= David Guerrier =

French trumpeter and hornist (born 1984)

- Born: 2 December 1984 (age 41); Pierrelatte, France
- Genres: Classical
- Occupations: Trumpeter and cornet player

David Guerrier (born 2 December 1984) is a French classical trumpeter and cornet player.

== Life ==
Born in Pierrelatte, France, Guerrier began his musical studies in 1990 at the Conservatoire du Tricastin first at the piano, then at the age of seven, he began to play the trumpet in Serge Vivarès' class. He met Pierre Dutot in Grasse in 1994 during an internship and joined his class at the Conservatoire de Lyon in 1997 after having obtained a special exemption given his young age (13 years). He perfected his skills there until 2000, also learning the baroque trumpet with Jean-François Madeuf, already developing his taste for playing the works studied on the original instruments of the composition. At the age of eleven, he participated in L'École des fans dedicated to Maurice André and five years later won the 1st Grand Prix de la Ville de Paris of the famous Maurice André Trumpet Competition

His repertoire includes in particular Saint-Saëns' Septet (trumpet, two violins, viola, cello, double bass and piano) with the Capuçon brothers (Renaud and Gautier) and Frank Braley; Mozart's 4th horn concerto, and Leopold Mozart's Concerto for trumpet with the Orchestre de chambre de Paris (John Nelson); Schumann's Konzertstück for Four Horns and Orchestra (1849) with La Chambre Philharmonique (Emmanuel Krivine), the other horn players are Antoine Dreyfuss, Emmanuel Padieu and Bernard Schirrer, all 4 on Viennese horns; and the latest recording includes 2 tracks on the second album of the Anemos Quartet (trombones) – Anemos & Co – which are Arban's Carnival of Venice and Teutatès, fantaisie mystique by A. Corbin, with the Turbulences Ensemble (D. Guerrier, cornet; A. Ganaye, ophicleide; Chloé Ghisalberti, piano).

== Awards ==
- 2000 – First Prize at the Maurice André International Competition in Paris
- 2001 – First prize in the Philys Jone Competition with the Turbulences Brass Quintet.
- 2003 – Prix Association française d'action artistique at the Midem in Cannes.
- 2003 – Prix Young Concert Artist Auditions à New York.
- 2003 – First Prize of the ARD International Music Competition
