= Vahan Mardirossian =

Armenian pianist and conductor (born 1975)

Vahan Mardirossian (born 26 May 1975, in Yerevan) is an Armenian pianist and conductor.

== Life ==
Settled in Paris in 1993, Mardirossian entered the Conservatoire de Paris in Jacques Rouvier's piano class, and was also admitted in Jean Mouillère's chamber music class. In 1996, he was awarded the first prize for piano.

On 16 January 2013, he performed with Mourad Amirkhanian, Dana Ciocarlie and Karine Babajanyan, at salle Gaveau in Paris.

== Discography ==
- Franz Schubert: sonata Op. posth. 120 D.664, impromptus Op. 90 D. 899, Wanderer - Fantasy Op. 15 D. 760 (2001) (Diapason d'Or)
- Éric Tanguy - Work for piano : passacaille, 2 studies, sonata No 1, 5 preludes, sonata No 2 (2002)
- Johannes Brahms - Sonatas for piano and violin (with Marina Chiche) (2003)
- Piano Transcription: Johann Sebastian Bach transcribed by Franz Liszt, Ferruccio Busoni, Sergei Rachmaninoff, Alexander Ziloti... (2004)
- Georg Friedrich Haendel: suites for piano No 3, 5, 7, sonata in B flat major, chaconne (2004)
- Johannes Brahms: Work for Piano - Volume 1: Sonata No 3 Op. 5, ballades op. 10, valses op. 39... (2005)
- Franz Liszt: Sonata In B Minor, Transcriptions (2007)
- Armenia: pieces by Armenian composers such as Aram Khachaturian, Arno Babadjanian, ... (with Jean-Marc Phillips-Varjabédian and Xavier Phillips) (2007)
- Ludwig van Beethoven - Neuvième Vague: Grande sonate pathétique Op. 13, Moon sonata Op. 27 No 2, Tempête Op. 31 No 2, Pastorale Op. 28 (2010)
- Florentine Mulsant - Face à Face: Symphonie No 1 for string orchestra, Op. 32, 24 Preludes for Piano Op. 38 (2013)
