= Bacri =

Bacri is an Algerian Jewish surname. Notable people with the surname include:

- Jean-Pierre Bacri (1951–2021), French actor and screenwriter
- Nicolas Bacri (born 1961), French composer
- Roland Bacri (1926–2014), French journalist and poet
