= Benelli =

Benelli may refer to:

- Benelli Armi, an Italian firearm manufacturer
- Benelli (motorcycles), an Italian motorcycle manufacturer
- HSR-Benelli, an Austrian-Italian manufacturer of personal watercraft
- Benelli (surname), an Italian surname
