= Benelli (surname) =

Benelli is a surname. Notable people with the surname include:

- Andrea Benelli (born 1960), Italian sports shooter
- Giovanni Benelli (1921–1982), Italian cardinal
- Manuela Benelli (born 1963), Italian volleyball player
- Sem Benelli (1877–1949), Italian playwright, essayist and librettist
- Vanessa Benelli Mosell (born 1987), Italian classical pianist

== See also ==
- Benelli (disambiguation)
