= Vanessa Benelli Mosell =

Italian pianist and conductor

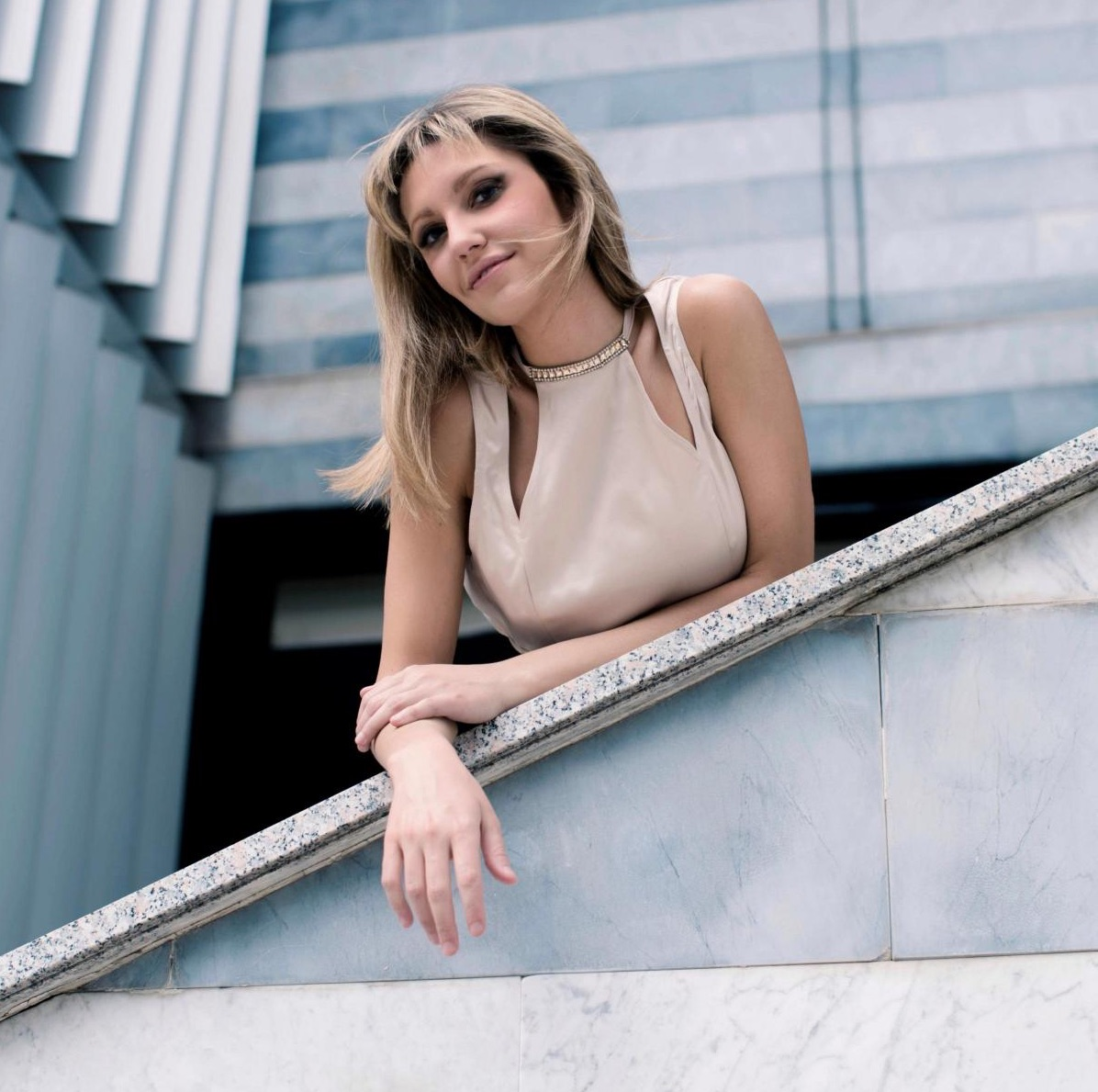

Background information
- Born: 15 November 1987 (age 38); Prato (Tuscany), Italy
- Genre: Classical
- Occupation: Pianist
- Years active: 2001–present
- Labels: Decca, Universal Music Group
- Website: vanessabenellimosell.com

Vanessa Benelli Mosell (born 15 November 1987 in Prato, Tuscany) is an Italian pianist and conductor.

== Early life ==
Vanessa Benelli Mosell was born in Prato on 15 November 1987, from a father native of Prato and a Florentine mother of distant Alsatian origins. Vanessa began playing the piano at the age of three, starting her comprehensive musical studies and giving her first public appearance at four years old. At seven years old, she was admitted to the International Piano Academy in Imola where she studied with Franco Scala. She gave her orchestral debut as soloist at the age of nine followed by her New York debut appearance at eleven years old with pianist Pascal Rogé, who described her as "the most natural musical talent I have encountered in my entire life". In 2007, she was invited to the Moscow Tchaikovsky Conservatory to study with Mikhail Voskresensky before pursuing her studies with Dmitri Alexeev at the Royal College of Music in London, where she graduated in 2012. In addition to her piano studies, she studied violin, singing, score reading, composition, and conducting.

== Career ==
Later highlights include her debut at La Scala in Milan and Turin's Teatro Regio at the MiTo Festival; solo recitals at the Muziekgebouw in Amsterdam and at the Seoul Arts Center; chamber music with the Russian violinist Vadim Repin; a tour of China making solo debuts at Beijing National Centre for the Performing Arts, Harbin Grand Theater and Chongqing Guotai Arts Center among other venues; performances at Salle Gaveau in Paris, performing Chopin's Piano Concerto No. 1 with Orchestre Pasdeloup, and her Rachmaninov album launch recital at Salle Cortot in Paris.

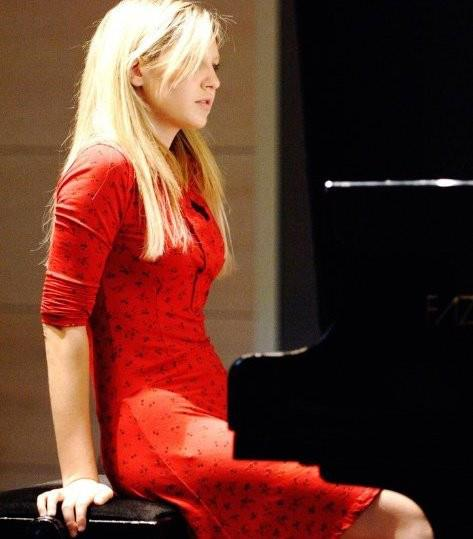
Benelli Mosell in Kürten at the Stockhausen Courses

2018 saw her making her debut with the Royal Scottish National Orchestra performing Ravel's Piano Concerto and concerts at the Royal Festival Hall, Southbank Centre, with the London Philharmonic Orchestra, rejoining Southbank three months later for a performance during the 2019 Stockhausen Festival at the Royal Festival Hall. She revisited the Ravel Piano Concerto at Al-Bustan Festival in Beirut and launched the 2019 Festival Presences at Auditorium de Radio France in Paris.

Further orchestral appearances include concerts with the Orchestra of the Teatro Comunale di Bologna, Orchestra of the Teatro Regio di Torino, Orchestre philharmonique de Strasbourg, Münchner Symphoniker, Zurich Chamber Orchestra, Edmonton Symphony Orchestra, Jerusalem Symphony Orchestra and the Moscow Soloists, with whom she replaced Martha Argerich as soloist.

Since making debuts at New York's Lincoln Center, Tonhalle, Zürich, and London's Wigmore Hall, Benelli Mosell has given concerts and solo recitals at Hamburg's Laeiszhalle, Berliner Philharmonie, Auditorio Nacional de Madrid, Palau de la Musica Catalana in Barcelona, Auditorio de Saragoza, Palau de la Musica in Valencia, Auditorium de Radio France and Auditorium du Louvre in Paris, Auditorium Manzoni in Bologna, Sala Verdi in Milan, Dublin National Concert Hall, Haifa Auditorium, Seoul Arts Center, Muziekgebouw Amsterdam, Harbin Grand Theater, Beijing NCPA, London's Royal Festival Hall and Kings Place, La Scala in Milano, Teatro Regio in Turin, Salle Poirel in Nancy, Corum in Montpellier, Théatre de la Criée in Marseille, Bavaria's Schloss Elmau, Glasgow Royal Concert Hall and Usher Hall in Edinburgh.

As conductor she has worked with Le Balcon, Graz Recreation, Lithuanian Symphony Orchestra, Juni Orchestra of the Accademia di Santa Cecilia, Hof Symphoniker, Philharmonie Bonn and the Vienna Chamber Orchestra, conducting the first performance in Austria of Éric Tanguy's Incanto (2001). She has also conducted the Divertimento Ensemble in Milan.

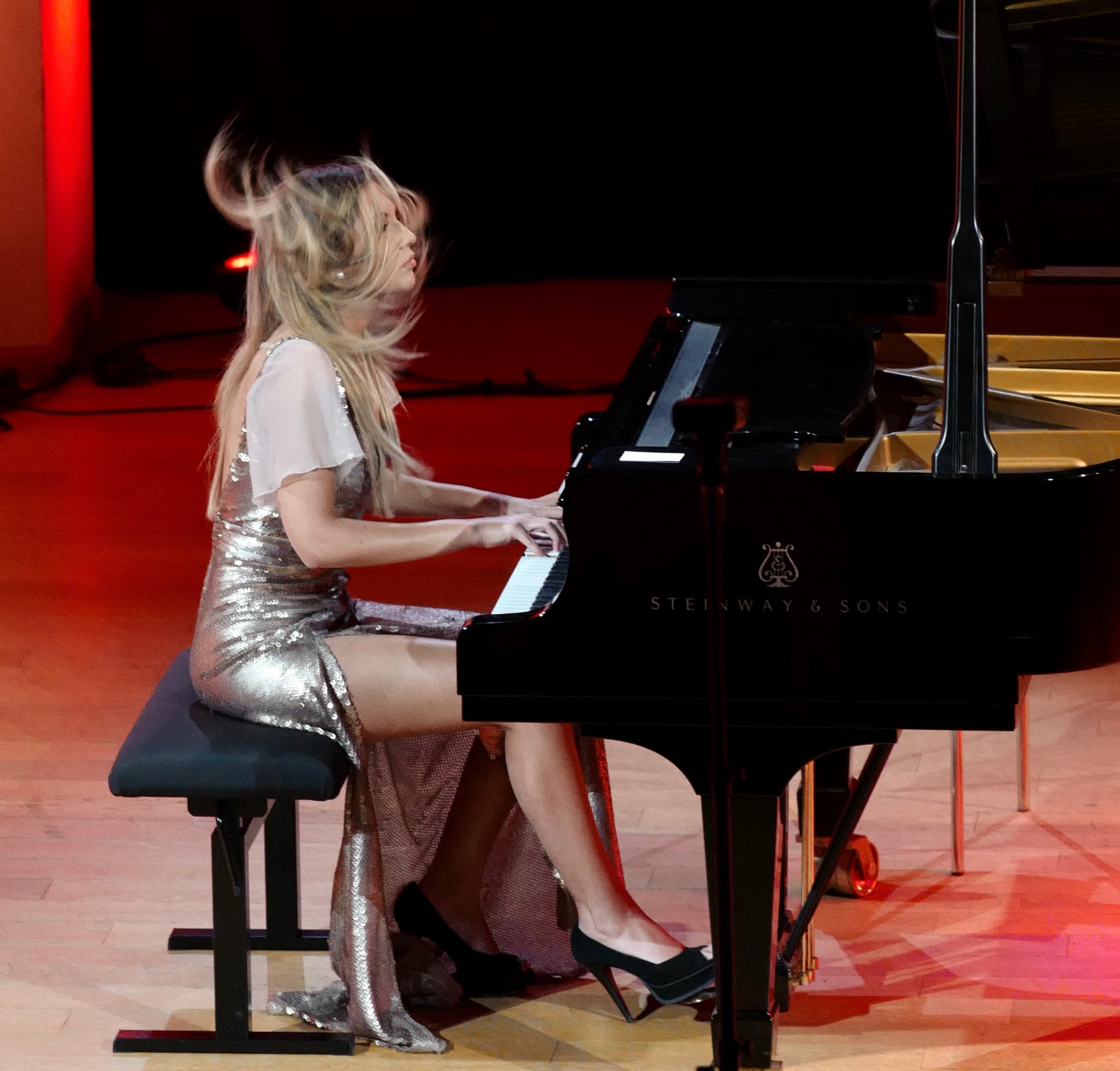
Vanessa Benelli Mosell in Lille

Benelli Mosell is internationally renowned for her performances of Karlheinz Stockhausen's Klavierstücke. Following her recording of Klavierstücke I–IV, she was invited by the composer to study under him.

Benelli Mosell has collaborated with contemporary composers including George Benjamin, Hugues Dufourt, Stefano Gervasoni, Martin Matalon and Marco Stroppa.

As a chamber music performer she collaborated with Renaud and Gautier Capuçon, Julian Rachlin, Vadim Repin, Massimo Quarta, Daishin Kashimoto, Radovan Vlatkovich and his partner the French cellist Henri Demarquette, with whom she released the album Echoes for Decca, a juxtaposition of works by Philip Glass and Sergei Rachmaninoff for cello and piano.

== Discography ==
Benelli Mosell's debut recording Introducing Vanessa Benelli Mosell, Virtuoso Piano Music features music by Prokofiev, Haydn, Scriabin and Liszt and received praise for her musical talent and "sparkling technique in demanding music" (Gramophone Magazine). Gramophone Magazine also said of the album that "music which should burn with an elemental romanticism too often ends up sounding superficial".

Her debut recording was followed in September 2012 by her second Liszt recital. In spring 2015, Benelli Mosell released her recording, and debut on the Decca label – a juxtaposition of Karol Beffa, Stockhausen and Stravinsky and followed this in 2016 with Light, a further disc in her Stockhausen series. She now has five releases for Decca Classics, most recently a disc of Debussy's Preludes Book I and Suite bergamasque.

Benelli Mosell is a Steinway Artist.
