= Orchestre Royal de Chambre de Wallonie =

Belgian orchestra

The Orchestre Royal de Chambre de Wallonie (English: Royal Chamber Orchestra of Wallonia) is a Belgian chamber orchestra based in Mons.

== History ==
The Orchestra was founded in 1958 by the violinist Lola Bobesco and its leadership was entrusted successively to the concertmasters Philippe Hirschhorn, Jean-Pierre Wallez, Georges Octors, and, since 2003, Augustin Dumay. It regularly accompanies soloists, instrumentalists, and vocalists at the semi-finals of the Queen Elisabeth Music Competition. Artists who have collaborated with the Orchestra have included José van Dam, Mstislav Rostropovitch, Mischa Maisky, Arthur Grumiaux, Jean-Pierre Rampal, Paul Tortelier, Philippe Hirschhorn, Janos Starker, Aldo Ciccolini, Maria João Pires, and Frank Braley.

In addition to giving numerous domestic performances, notably in Wallonia (specifically at its residence in Mons) and in Brussels (Palais des Beaux-Arts), the ensemble is also engaged at famous concert halls and prestigious music festivals abroad, such as the Concertgebouw in Amsterdam, the Théâtre des Champs-Élysées in Paris, the Folles Journées in Nantes, Lisbon, Bilbao, and Tokyo, and the Menton.
