= Pierre Dutot =

French trumpetist (1946–2021)

- Born: 11 June 1946
- Died: 24 August 2021 (aged 75)
- Occupations: Trumpeter; Professor

Pierre Dutot (11 June 1946 – 24 August 2021) was a French trumpetist and professor. He studied at the Conservatoire de Paris and taught at the Conservatoire de Lyon for 22 years. He was also a soloist for the Orchestre National de Lyon.

== Life ==
Dutot gained First prize in trumpet at the Conservatoire de Paris, and was a graduate in physical education and psychology. He founded the brass ensemble Hexagone participated in the recording of more than 80 CDs.

Dutot, a professor at the Conservatoire national supérieur de musique et de danse de Lyon for 22 years, was one of the most sought-after teachers in the French brass school. His students have won numerous national and international competitions. Among them, Pascal Clarhaut, David Guerrier (first prize at the Munich International Competition in 2003), and André Henry (first prize at the Geneva International Competition in 1996). The French Ministry of Culture entrusted him with a centre for the preparation of trumpet professors. On many occasions, he was a jury member for French conservatories and in national and international competitions.

In addition to his French students, eight nationalities were represented in his class at the Bordeaux Conservatory. Classical trumpeter Maurice André sent young international talents to perfect their skills in his class:

I congratulate this great teaching artist and strongly encourage him to continue his action which honours the French brass school.

Dutot died on 24 August 2021 after an illness.
