= Lola Bobesco =

Romanian violinist (1921–2003)

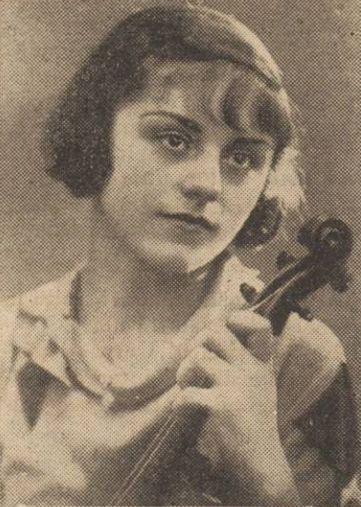
- Born: 9 August 1921; Craiova, Romania
- Died: 4 September 2003 (aged 82); Spa, Belgium
- Occupations: Violinist, Music educator

Lola Violeta Ana-Maria Bobesco (9 August 1921– 4 September 2003) was a Belgian violinist of Romanian origin.

== Biography ==
She was born in Craiova, Romania, and began her career as a child prodigy, giving her first recital there at the age of 6 with her father, composer and conductor Aurel Bobescú. She continued her studies at the Ecole Normale Musique de Paris (1928–1935) with Marcel Chailley (violin), and at the Conservatoire de Paris (1931–1935) with Jules Bucher, where she gained her first prize in 1934, and graduated with the "Prix d'Excellence." She took private violin lessons with George Enescu and Jacques Thibaud. She became known internationally after appearing in Paris (1936) aged 17 with the Colonne Orchestra under the baton of Paul Paray, where she performed a concerto by Romanian composer Stan Golestan. The following year, 1937, she obtained the seventh prize at the Eugène Ysaÿe contest.

Although established abroad even before the end of World War II, she returned to Romania and regularly appeared in concerts with the Radio Philharmonic in Bucharest, and the provinces in Craiova, Brasov, Iasi, Timișoara.

She founded two musical groups in Belgium: in 1958, the Orchestre Royal de Chambre de Wallonie in Liège; and in 1990, the string quartet L'Arte del Suono in Brussels.

She was also a professor at the French-language Conservatoire royal de Bruxelles and professor of violin at the Conservatory of Liège (1962–1974). She was on the jury of the Queen Elizabeth Competition in 1971 and 1993. She recorded sonatas of Ludwig van Beethoven, Gabriel Fauré, Johannes Brahms, César Franck and Claude Debussy, and also baroque music including concertos by Johann Sebastian Bach. She also worked with major orchestral ensembles of the world, including: Berlin and London Philharmonics, French orchestra Colonne, Lamoureux and Pas de loup, Concertgebouw Orchestra (Amsterdam), La Suisse Romande (Geneva), and the Orchestra Accademia Santa Cecilia (Rome). At concert and chamber music recitals, she was often accompanied by pianist Jacques Genty, who became her husband in 1948.

A violinist of exceptional artistic force in spite of her delicate physique, Bobesco balanced technical virtuosity with simplicity and interpretative austerity. Purity of lyrical expression, clear intonation, warm communicative musical phrasing, and originality of conception put her among the top international female performers. She recorded for Decca (the Franck and first Fauré sonatas with Genty), Columbia, Les Discophiles Français, Nippon Program Arcophon, and others. A recording of the fifth Vieuxtemps concerto was reissued by Audite in 2007.

She died in Sart-lez-Spa, Belgium.

Her violin was attributed to Giovanni Battista Guadagnini.

The street 'Rue Lola Bobesco' that circles behind the cultural centre at the Brussels commune of Woluwe-Saint-Lambert, is named after her.
