= Boris Berezovsky =

Boris Berezovsky is the name of:

- Boris Berezovsky (pianist) (born 1969), Russian classical pianist
- Boris Berezovsky (businessman) (1946–2013), Russian oligarch businessman and engineer
