= Christian Manen =

French composer (1934–2020)

Christian Manen (3 July 1934 – 11 September 2020) was a French composer and music teacher.

Born in Boulogne-Billancourt, Manen studied at the Conservatory of Nice and between 1949 and 1961 at the Conservatoire de Paris. Here he was a student of Berthe Duru (solfège), Jules Gentil (piano), Félix Passerone (drums), Marcel Dupré and Rolande Falcinelli (organ and improvisation), Louis Fourestier (conducting), Noël Gallon (counterpoint and fugue), Henri Challan (harmony), Norbert Dufourcq (music history) and Tony Aubin (composition). In 1961 he won the Premier Grand Prix de Rome with the cantata La Loreley. This was followed by a stay at the Villa Medici in Rome until 1965.

== Career ==
Manen had been teaching at the Conservatory of Asnières since 1954 and a professor at the Conservatoire de Paris since 1965. He also taught at the Conservatoire Supérieur de Paris (CNR) and other music schools, including the École supérieure de musique César-Franck. Since 1985 he gave regular lectures at the Académie internationale d'été de Nice. Among his students were Thierry Escaich, Selman Ada, Pascal Devoyon, Nicolas Bacri, Pascal Godart, Raphaël Sanchez, Rémi Guillard, Alexandre Tharaud and Cédric Tiberghien.

In 1970 he founded the Orchestre des Cadets d'Asnières, which he conducted until 1999 and with which he gave almost one hundred concerts in Paris, all of Europe and the USA. He also conducted the Turkish National Orchestra in Istanbul for several years. He was also organist in numerous churches in Paris and was a member of the Union des Maîtres de Chapelle et Organistes since 1960. In 1999 he retired from teaching.

Manen composed about 140 works, including orchestral and chamber music, motets and other choral and vocal works and music educational pieces.
