= Pascal Clarhaut =

Trumpeter

Pascal Clarhaut is a French classical trumpeter, teacher, solo trumpet of the orchestre de l'Opéra national de Paris.

== Life ==
Originally from the North of France, he studied music at Leers, Roubaix and Tourcoing before moving to Orléans and then to the Conservatoire de Lyon where he unanimously obtained a first prize for trumpet in Pierre Dutot's class. He was then appointed principal cornet and then principal trumpet within the orchestre philharmonique de Strasbourg. In 1991, he was appointed principal trumpet at the orchestre de l'Opéra national de Paris, a position he still held in 2017.

An internationally renowned artist, in parallel with the concerts he gives throughout the world, he is a professor at the Conservatory of Aulnay-sous-Bois and since 2010, at the Pôle d'enseignement supérieur de la musique en Seine-Saint-Denis-Île-de-France.

Thanks to "his recognized pedagogical qualities", and in order to "share his knowledge" he regularly leads master classes in France and abroad.

== Concerts, premieres and recordings ==
Clarhaut mainly plays works by 20th-century composers. For example:

- in 1996, he participated in the premiere of composer Gilles Silvestrini's Descant for trumpet, French horn, trombone and string orchestra; with Hervé Joulain (French horn), Jacques Mauger (trombone) and the orchestra of the Flaine festival conducted by Victor Costa. The work will later be recorded under the direction of conductor Laurent Petitgirard.
- in 1997, he was the main interpreter with Viviane Loriaut (organ) of the disc Lumière, trompette et orgue, works by several 20th-century composers, including the Czech composer Petr Eben and the French Jean Rivier. (reference n°|BMG/RCA CD-47018)
- in 2004, he is one of the recording instrumentalists of Stravinski's L'Histoire du soldat.
- in 2005, he is one of the instrumentalists of the composer André David's work: Musique de chambre avec clavier; with Marc Sieffert(alto saxophone), Christine Marchais (piano), Jean Fessard (percussions) and Pierrick Antoine (little organ) CD MA051201
