= Frank Braley =

French pianist (born 1968)

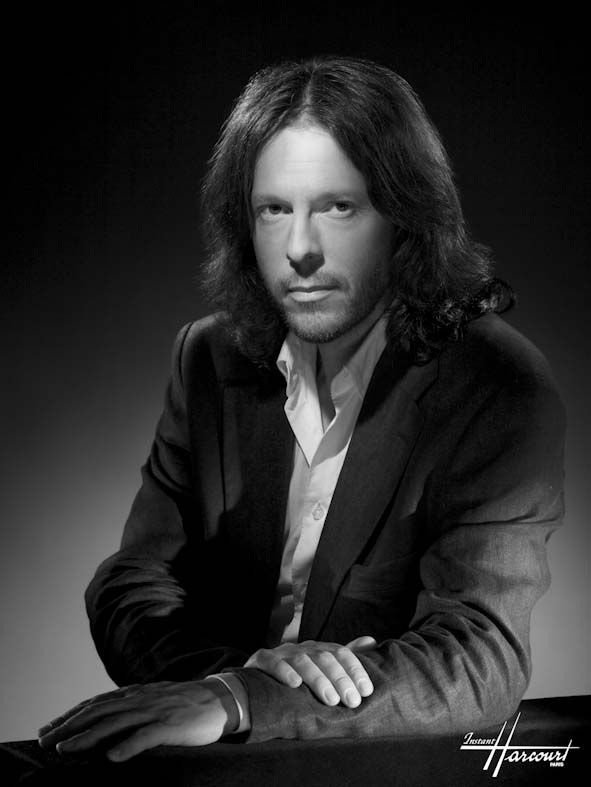
Frank Braley in 2008

Frank Braley (born 4 October 1968) is a French classical pianist.

== Biography ==
Born in Corbeil-Essonnes, Braley began studying the piano at the age of four with his mother. At the age of ten, he gave his first concert with the Orchestre philharmonique de Radio France. He then pursued normal studies and obtained his baccalaureate at the age of seventeen. He subsequently undertook scientific studies at university before opting for music: at the age of eighteen, he joined the Conservatoire de Paris where he worked with Pascal Devoyon, Christian Ivaldi and Jacques Rouvier. There he won first prize in piano and chamber music.

In 1991, he won the first prize and the public prize of the Queen Elisabeth Competition. From then on, his career was launched. He travels and plays all over the world under the baton of conductors such as Charles Dutoit, Marek Janowski, Armin Jordan and Kurt Masur. He also performs as a chamber musician or in recitals with artists such as Éric Le Sage, Mischa Maisky, Emmanuel Pahud and Maria João Pires. Every year, he is the guest of major festivals including the Festival de La Roque-d'Anthéron, Périgord Noir, Un violon sur le sable, etc. He is fond of literature and loves jazz.

In April 2007, Braley performed Ravel's piano concerto with the Orchestre français des jeunes, under Jean-Claude Casadesus's direction, at the Auditorium de Dijon, Théâtre des Champs-Élysées in Paris, at La Rochelle (La Coursive) and the Opéra de Vichy.

Braley most often plays chamber music with Renaud and Gautier Capuçon. A recording of Beethoven's Ten sonatas for violin and piano was issued in 2010.

Since September 2011, Braley has been a professor at the Conservatoire de Paris.

At the end of 2012, the Orchestre Royal de Chambre de Wallonie announced that he will succeed Augustin Dumay as music director of this orchestra during the 2013–14 season. Not only does he intend to conduct keyboards in piano concerti for which he will assume the soloist part, but he will also take over much of the orchestral conducting and explore chamber music with the soloists of each pulpit during his mandate.

In May–June 2013, he was a member of the jury during the entire session (from the eliminatory to the final rounds) of the Queen Elisabeth Competition at Le Flagey and the Centre for Fine Arts, Brussels.

Since January 2014, Braley has been music director of the Orchestre Royal de Chambre de Wallonie.

In October 2015, he was a member of the jury for the Long-Thibaud-Crespin Competition.

== Discography ==
1996

- Franz Schubert's Sonata in A major, D. 959 - 3 Klavierstücke D946 - (Harmonia mundi-serie "les nouveaux interprète" ) out of stock and not reissued.

1998

- Richard Strauss's Pieces for piano Op. 3 (Harmonia Mundi)

2002

- Maurice Ravel's Sonatas and trios Virgin Classics)

2004

- Franz Schubert's Trout Quintet with Gautier Capuçon, cellist and Renaud Capuçon, violin, Gérard Caussé, viola and Aloïs Posch, double bass (Virgin Classics)

2005

- Récital, works by Schubert (Harmonia Mundi)
- George Gershwin, L’œuvre pour piano (Harmonia Mundi)
- Felix Mendelssohn, Octet Op. 20, Variations concertantes in D major for cello and piano Op. 17, Song without words in D major for cello and piano Op. 109. and Album-leaf in E minor Op. 117, with the "Ensemble Explorations" conducted by Roel Dieltiens (Harmonia Mundi)

2007

- Antonín Dvořák, Quintet Op. 81, Bagatelles Op. 47, with the "Ensemble Explorations" conducted by Roel Dieltiens (Harmonia Mundi)
- Schubert, Trios pour piano n°1 and 2 with Gautier Capuçon, cellist and Renaud Capuçon, violinist (Virgin Classics)
- Franz Liszt, Sonetti di Petrarca No 104 and 123 and La lugubre gondola II, Debussy's Neuf préludes des Livres I et II and Gershwin's Rhapsody in blue and Prélude n° 3, filmed at the festival de La Roque-d'Anthéron (DVD Naïve)

2011

- Ludwig van Beethoven's sonatas for violin and piano with Renaud Capuçon. 3CD Virgin Classics, 2011

In addition, in 2012, Franck Braley appears as Alexandre Tharaud's partner on the album Le Bœuf sur le toît - Swinging Paris (Virgin), album paying tribute to the legendary tandem of pianists Wiener-Doucet.

2013

- Arpeggione: Sonatas for piano and cellos by Benjamin Britten, Claude Debussy and Robert Schumann, accompanied by Gautier Capuçon as cellist (Erato, series Parlophone at warner music, November 2013)
