= Brigitte Engerer =

French pianist (1952–2012)

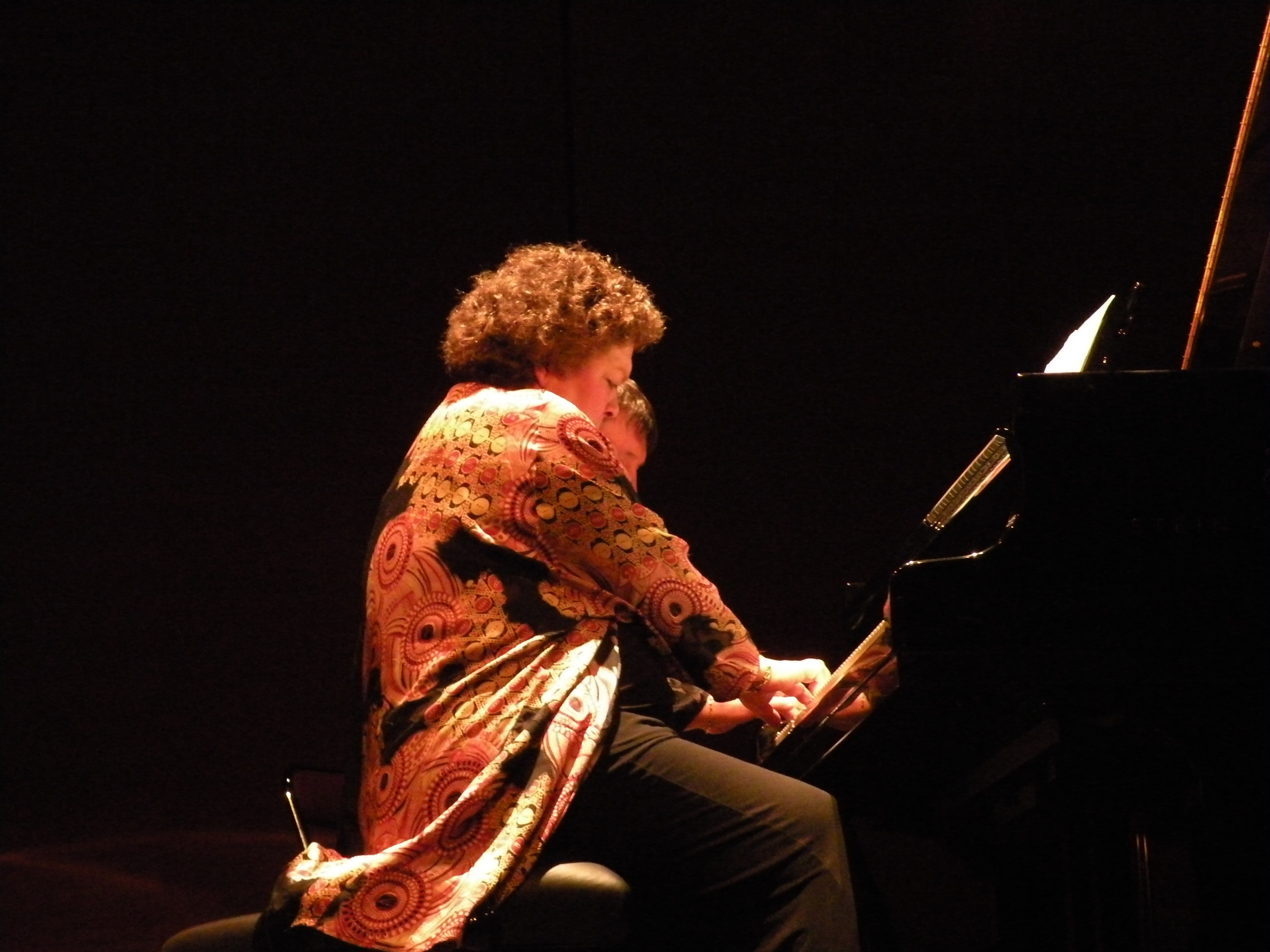
Engerer at the 2009 Folle Journée.

Brigitte Engerer (French: [ɑ̃ɡəʁɛʁ]; 27 October 1952 – 23 June 2012) was a French pianist.

== Biography ==
Born in Tunis, French Tunisia, Engerer started piano lessons at the age of four, and by the age of six was performing in public. When she was 11 her family moved to France and she entered the Paris Conservatoire to study under Lucette Descaves. In 1968, aged 15, she was unanimously awarded a first prize in piano, and the following year she won the Concours International Marguerite Long-Jacques Thibaud. Engerer was subsequently invited to undertake further training at the Moscow Tchaikovsky Conservatory where she joined the class of Stanislav Neuhaus, who said she was "one of the most brilliant and most original pianists of her generation". Though her scholarship was originally for one year, she loved Russia so much that she studied there for nine years. She was placed third in the 1978 Queen Elisabeth Competition.

In 1980, her career took a decisive turn when Herbert von Karajan invited her to play with the Berlin Philharmonic. She subsequently received engagements with the Boston Symphony Orchestra, the New York Philharmonic and the Orchestre de Paris under Daniel Barenboim, and she was a favourite of conductors such as Mstislav Rostropovich and Zubin Mehta. Her subsequent career was divided between giving recitals and teaching at the Paris Conservatoire. Her last concert took place on 12 June 2012 at the prestigious Théâtre des Champs-Elysées, 50 years after playing there, at the age of nine, her first concert. The performance featured the work of Schumann. She died less than two weeks later, on 23 June, after a several year struggle against cancer. She was 59 years of age.

She had been married to the writer Yann Queffélec, with whom she had a daughter, Leonore. She later married Xavier Fourteau, and together they had a son, Harold Fourteau.

== Selected discography ==
- Tchaikovsky Piano Concerto No. 1 and Schumann Piano Concerto in A minor with the Royal Philharmonic Orchestra/Emmanuel Krivine
- The Complete Nocturnes by Frédéric Chopin. Engerer's recording of the Nocturnes can be heard on Youtube.
- Sonatas by Beethoven, Grieg and Schumann with Olivier Charlier
- Work for two pianos and piano duet of Rachmaninoff with Oleg Maisenberg and Boris Berezovsky
- A German Requiem by Brahms in a version for two pianos and chorus (London version) with Boris Berezovsky and Accentus Choir conducted by Laurence Equilbey
- Schumann's Carnaval and Scenes from Childhood
- Concertos by Clara and Robert Schumann; Orchestre régional de Cannes-Provence-Alpes-Côte d'Azur/Philippe Bender
- The works for cello and piano by Chopin; with Henri Demarquette
- Modest Mussorgsky: Pictures at an Exhibition and Night on Bald Mountain, Harmonia Mundi, 2006
- Childhood memories (Russian Music); booklet essay by Yann Queffélec (2007 Mirare) ("Choc" du Monde de la Musique)
- L'invitation au Voyage (French music) with Henry Demarquette ("Choc" du Monde de la Musique)
- Camille Saint-Saëns, Piano concert n°2 & n°5, Brigitte Engerer, piano, Ensemble Orchestral de Paris, conductor Andrea Quin (with concerto n°5). CD Mirare 2008
- Liszt: Harmonies poétiques et religieuses (2010, Mirare MIR 084)

== Filmography ==
Brigitte Engerer images appear repeatedly in Sophie Laloy's film Je te mangerais (released 11 March 2009), in which she is admired by Mary, the main character. She also plays the classical piano pieces heard in the film.

== International awards and honours ==
- Competition Marguerite Long-Jacques Thibaud
- Tchaikovsky Competition in Moscow
- Queen Elisabeth Competition of Belgium
- Grand Prix du Disque for her recording with Philips of Carnival op. 9 and the Carnival of Vienna Robert Schumann
- Corresponding member of the Institut de France, Academy of Fine Arts
- Win honor for lifetime achievement, the Victoires de la musique 2011 classic

== Decorations ==
- Chevalier of the Legion of Honour
- Commander of the Order of Merit
- Commander of Arts and Letters

== Quotation ==
"I need the transparency of the French piano — and, more important, the rationality of French philosophy. But I needed some of the Russian craziness in my playing. I still do."
