= Hydrospace =

The Hydrospace is the world's first four-stroke stand-up jet ski, or personal watercraft. It was introduced in October 2005 by Hydrospace. In 2007, Hydrospace changed their name to HSR-Benelli following the acquisition of Benelli Motori (related to, but unaffiliated with, Benelli shotguns or Benelli motorcycles).

The company originated in Pöchlarn, Austria, with sales networks worldwide. The Hydrospace is a single-passenger stand-up watercraft which was designed primarily for racing. Until 2008, the only model offered was the "Hydrospace S4", with a retail price of around US$15,000.

The S4 is powered by a two-cylinder water-cooled four-stroke engine with a displacement of 749cc, rated at 110 horsepower. The engine is equipped with a turbocharger from the factory, operating at 7.7 pounds per square inch of boost. The engine uses 91 US octane minimum gasoline.

The S4 has a dry weight of 370 pounds (170 kg), making it the second-heaviest stand-up ever made, second only to Sea-doo's 3D which had a dry weight of 580 lb (260 kg). As of the October 2016 unveiling of the Kawasaki SXR1500 at 550 lb (250 kg), the S4 is now the third-heaviest stand-up.

Although touted as being the most advanced stand-up ever manufactured, the S4 has been plagued with problems. They have, however, been resolved over the years. In 2008, the newly formed HSR-Benelli released additional models of personal watercraft, including a new runabout model.

HSR-Benelli has succeeded in winning several World Championship titles since 2006. In December, HSR-Benelli changed its name to Benelli srl, moved to Pesaro in Italy and is working on a new generation of PWCs which will be available for 2012.

== The 2010 model line includes ==
- S4 black and white
- Series-R Sport Edition
