= Pascal Godart =

French pianist

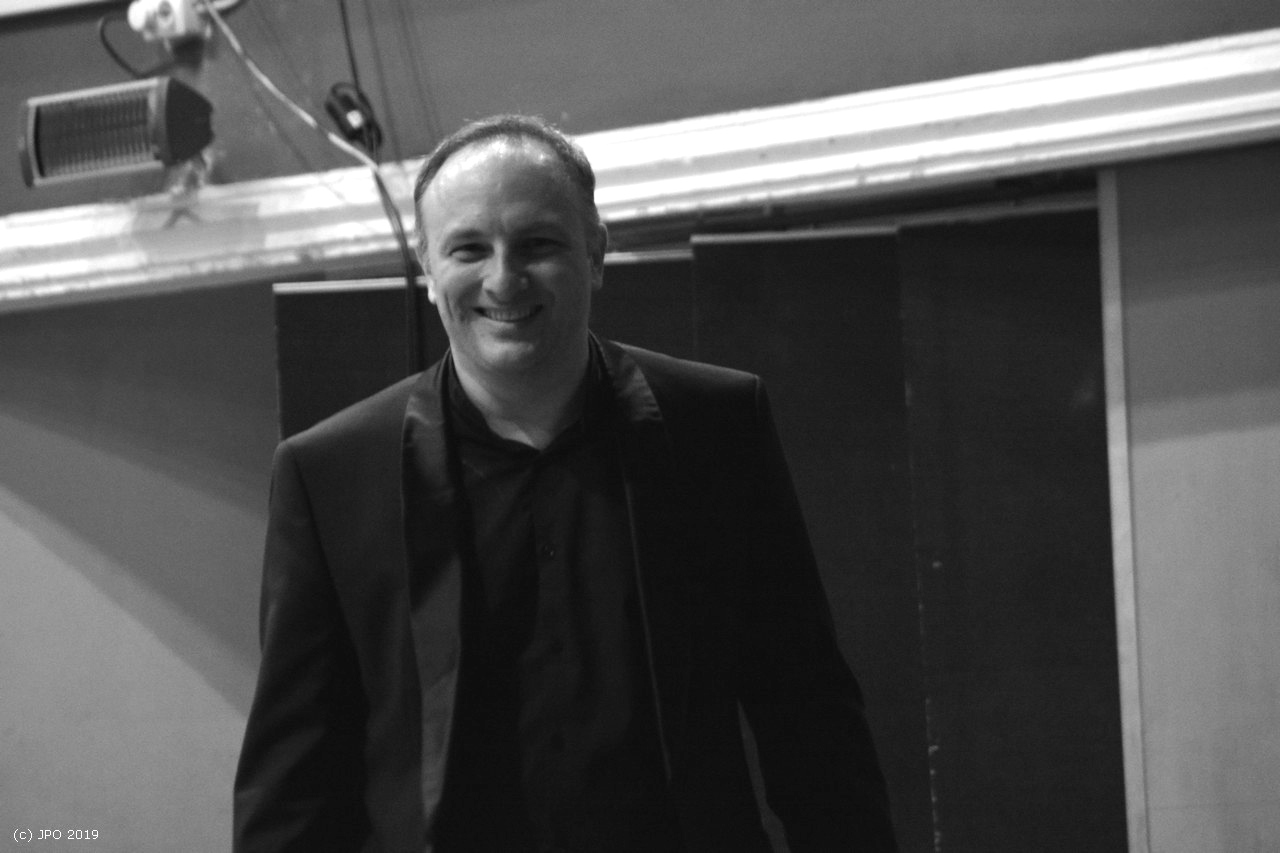
A portrait of Pascal Godart

Pascal Godart (dates unknown) is a French classical pianist.

== Biography ==
Godart learned to play the piano at age five with Renée Entremont, pianist Philippe Entremont's mother, in Brive-la-Gaillarde (France) then with Yvonne Loriod-Messiaen and received a first prize for piano, chamber music and accompaniment at the Conservatoire de Paris. He also worked the piano with Pierre Réach, Elena Varvarova and Vadim Sakharov.

He won international Piano Competitions in Milan (Dino Ciani Competition, 1993, 2nd prize), Cleveland (Robert Casadesus Competition (1989), 4th prize), Tokyo (1992) and Porto (1990 1st Grand Prize) and won the Grand Prix Maria Callas in Athens in 1996. He was then invited by numerous orchestras such as the Pasdeloup Orchestra, the Orchestre philharmonique de Nice, the Orchestre philharmonique de Strasbourg, the Monte-Carlo Philharmonic Orchestra, The Augusta Symphony Orchestra, the National Philharmonic of Ukraine, The Sankt-Petersburg Philharmonic Orchestra, the Orchestra of Young Russia. In addition to the works of Chopin and Ravel, his repertoire includes concertos by Rachmaninov, Brahms, Liszt, Mozart, Tchaikovsky, Bach, Prokofiev, Ravel and Beethoven among others.

As a chamber musician, he plays in particular with violinists Olivier Charlier, Ayako Tanaka, Mathilde Borsarello-Hermann, Gyula Stuller, Latica Honda-Rosenberg, cellists Natalia Gutman, Guillaume Martigné, Joel Marosi, Jean-Louis Capezzali (oboe), Florent Héau (clarinet), José-Daniel Castellon (flute), Jacques Deleplanque (horn), the Psophos Quartet, the Alma quartet. During a concert tour with the Dnipro orchestra, as well as with Timisoara Orchestra, he performed Mozart's piano concertos, also as a conductor. He recorded works by Bach, Gershwin, Schubert, Stravinsky, Saint-Saëns, and Dutilleux.

Since 2010, he has been Professor at the Hemu (Lausanne site) and as of 2022, he has been appointed Head of Piano and Accompaniment Department in Hemu Vaud - Valais - Fribourg and teaches every summer at Académie du Grand Paris.

Godart was a member of the jury at the International Maria Callas Grand Prix 2010 in Athens, and of the preselection committee at the 2014 Geneva International Piano Competition.
