= Hôtel Dumay =

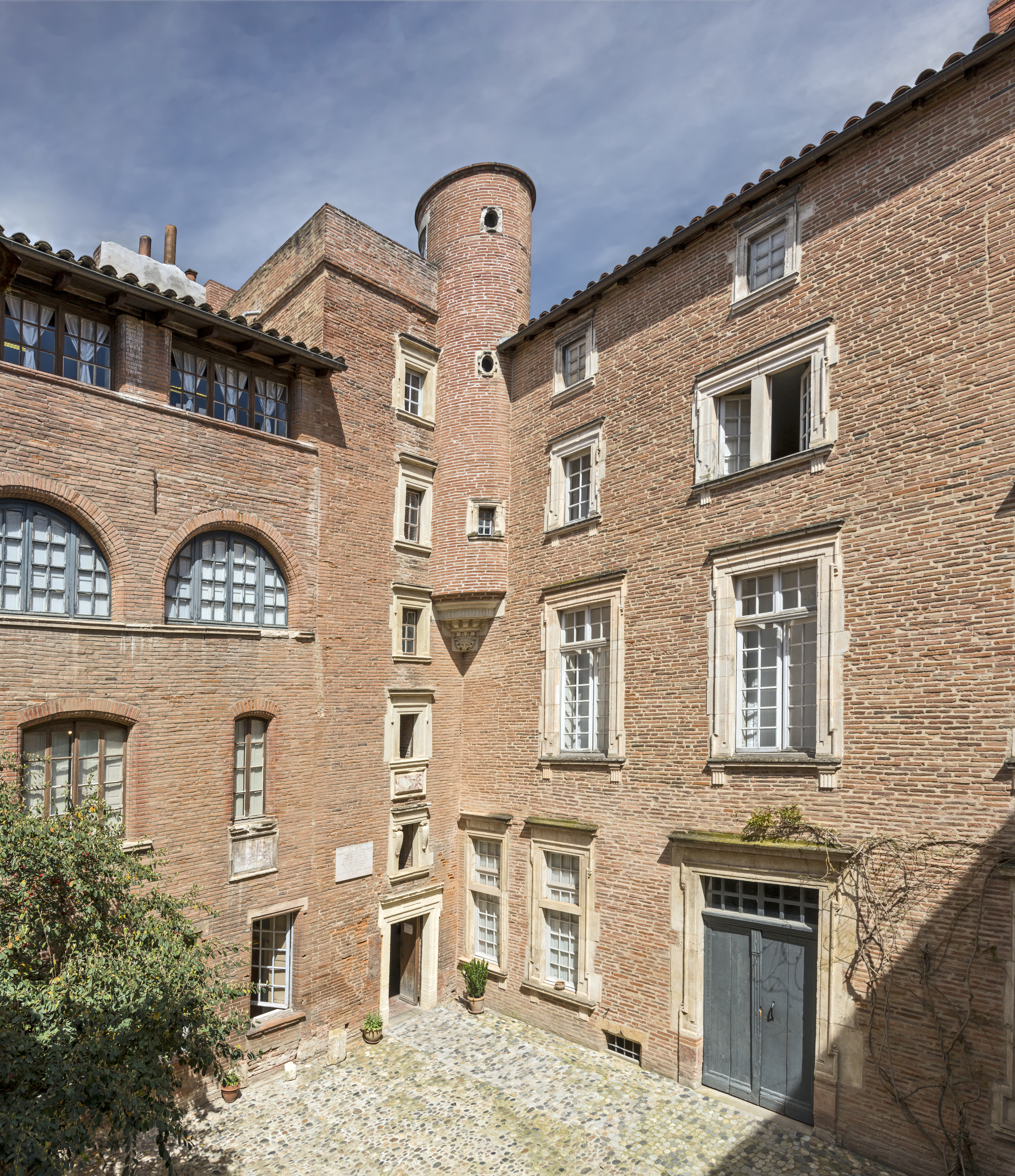
- Facade in the courtyard, 2018
- Interactive map of the Hôtel Dumay area

General information
- Type: Hôtel particulier
- Location: 7 rue Dumay, Toulouse, France
- Coordinates: 43°36′08″N 1°26′35″E
- Completed: 16th century

The Hôtel Dumay, a historic building in Toulouse, France, is a Renaissance hôtel particulier (palace) of the 16th century. It has been listed as an official historical monument by the French Ministry of Culture since June 21, 1950. The Dumay hotel retains the name of the man who built it at the end of the 16th century, Antoine Dumay, a renowned physician, notably a doctor of Marguerite de Valois, Henri IV's first wife. It now houses the Museum of Old Toulouse.

== Pictures ==
Hôtel Dumay

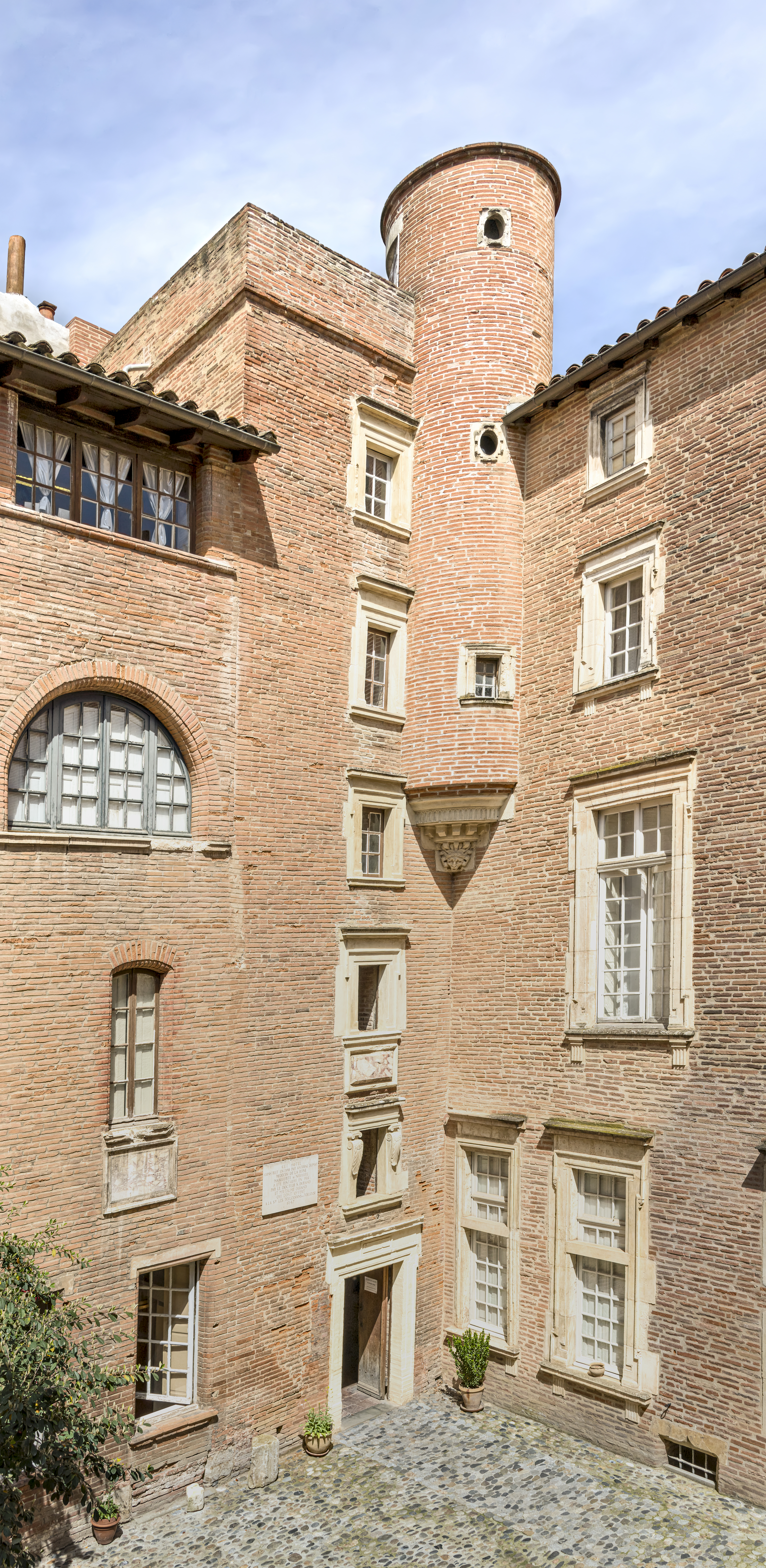
Capitoul Dumay's Tower

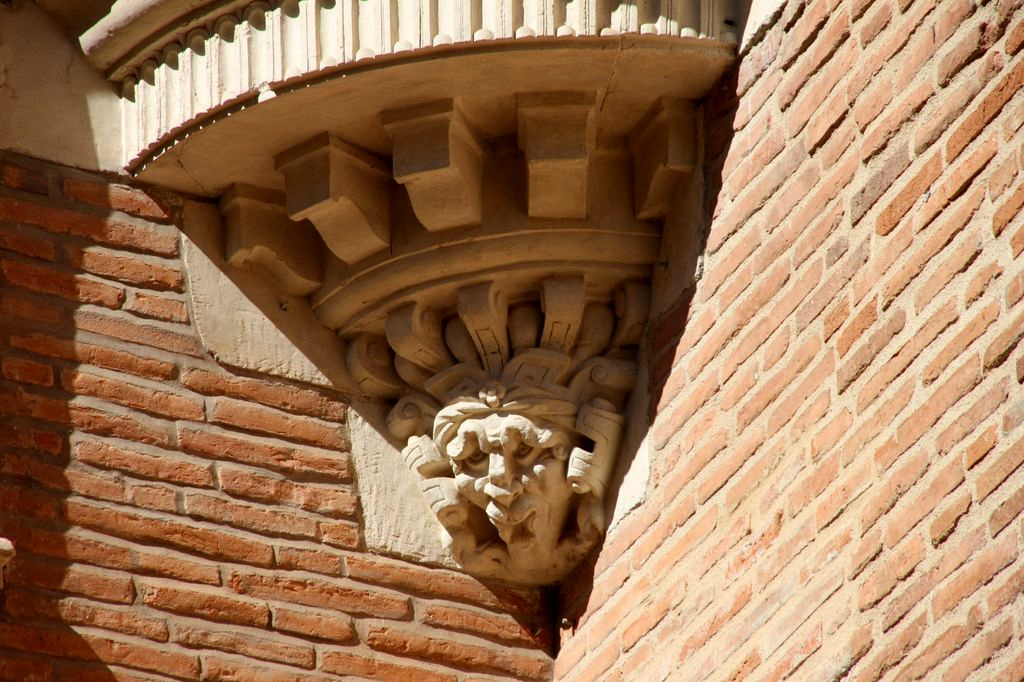

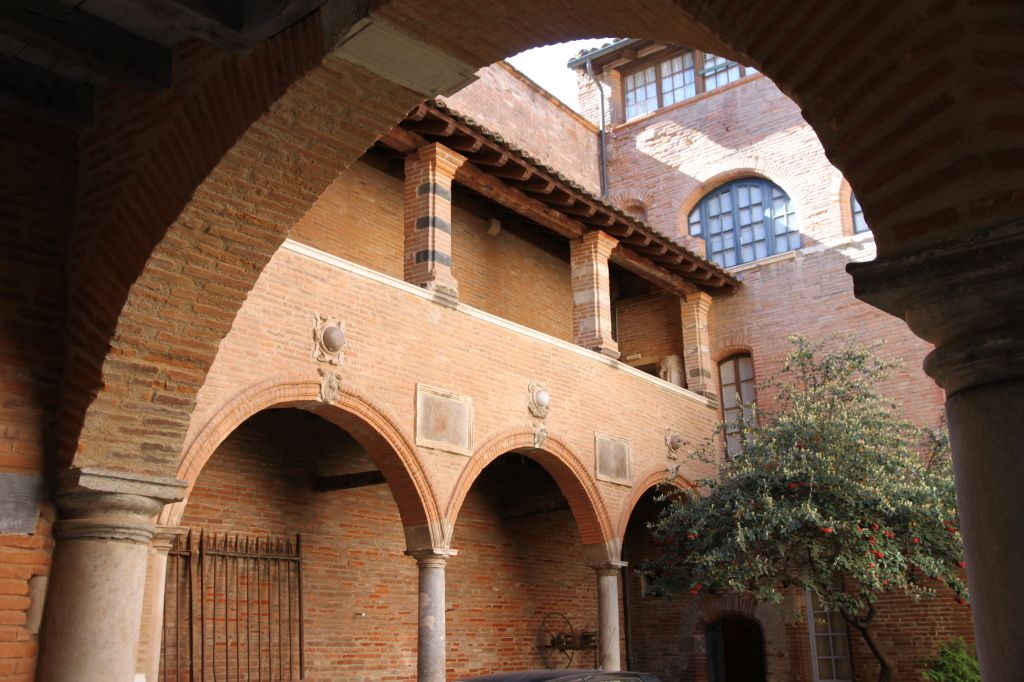

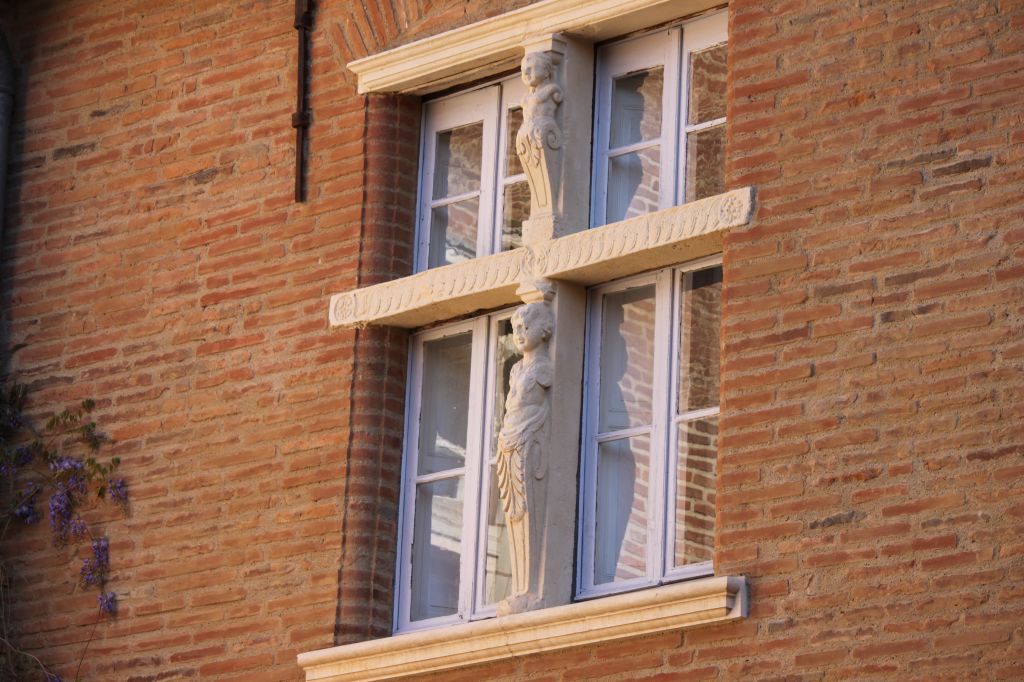

The courtyard, and the west facade

== See also ==
- Renaissance architecture of Toulouse

== Bibliography ==
- Guy Ahlsell de Toulza, Louis Peyrusse, Bruno Tollon, Hôtels et Demeures de Toulouse et du Midi Toulousain, Daniel Briand éditeur, Drémil Lafage, 1997
