= Jean-Yves Clément =

French essayist, poet and organizer of festivals

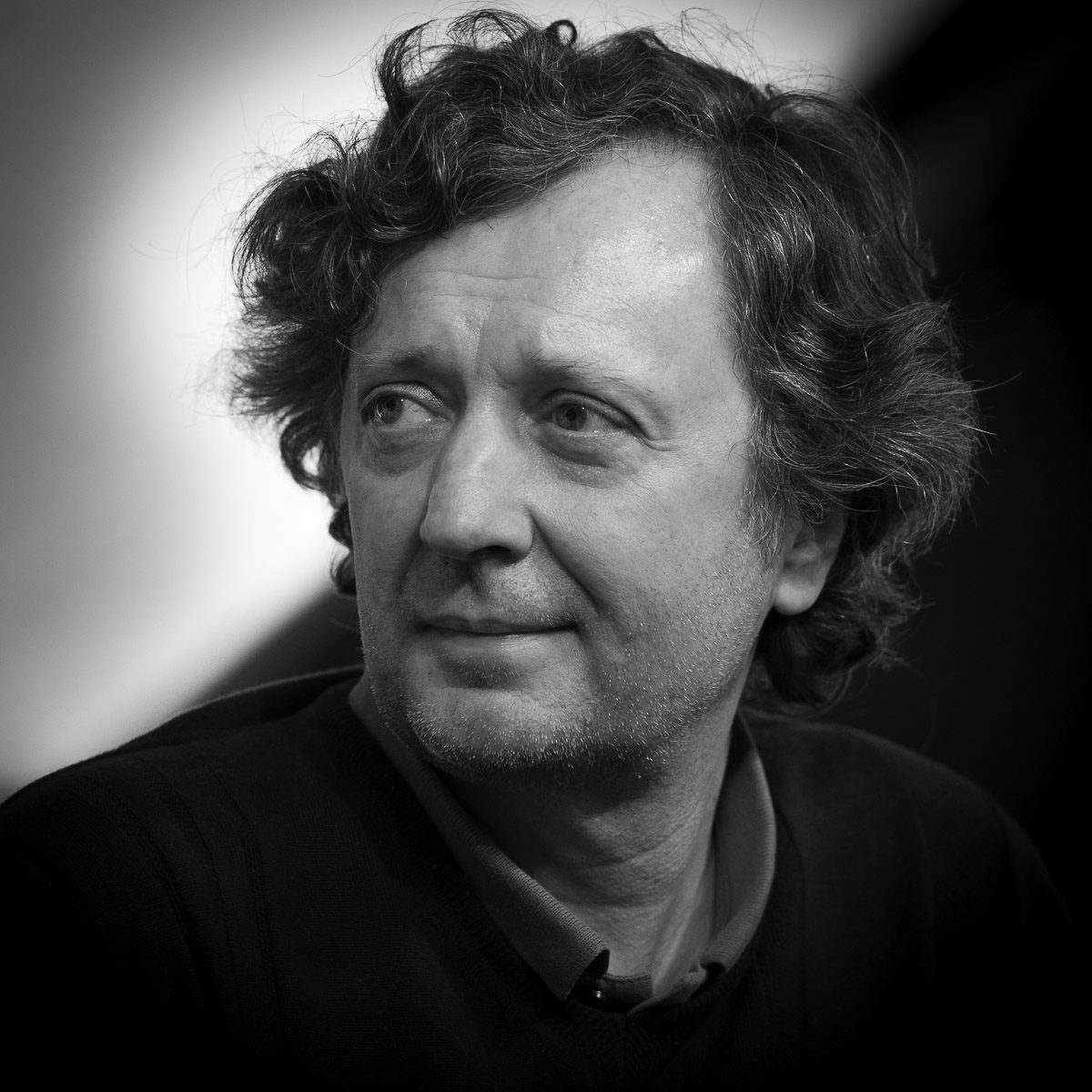
- Jean-Yves Clément, the 3 May 2014
- Born: July 21, 1959 (age 67); Bourges, France
- Occupations: Writer, poet, festivals creator
- Writing career
- Language: French
- Genres: Biographic essay, poetry
- Subjects: Composers, love
- Notable works: Nuits de l’âme, 2009; Les Deux Âmes de Frédéric Chopin, 2010; Franz Liszt : La Dispersion magnifique, 2011; Glenn Gould ou le Piano de l’esprit, 2016

Jean-Yves Clément (born July 21, 1959 in Bourges) is a French essayist, poet and organizer of festivals.

== Biography ==
Jean-Yves Clément pursued university advanced studies in philosophy (Nietzsche and art) and has a high level in piano and advanced musicology qualifications.

In 1990, he became collection director at the publishing house Le Cherche midi, a post he held until 2012. There he created the collection "Amor fati" and published the unedited works of authors including Alain-Fournier, Nietzsche, and Jules Renard.

Since 1995, he has been the artistic director of the Nohant Festival and creator of the Prix Pelléas, that rewards "the book with the finest literary qualities devoted to music".

In 2002, he founded the Lisztomanias of Châteauroux, a music festival where world-renowned artists gather. He is the artistic director, as well as Lisztomanias International, an association created in 2012 to export the model and the humanist spirit of Franz Liszt to the world.

In 2011, Jean-Yves Clément was appointed Commissioner General of the "Liszt Year" in France by Frédéric Mitterrand, the then Minister of Culture.

In 2012, Jean-Yves Clément received from the Minister of Culture Frédéric Mitterrand the title of officer in the Ordre des Arts et des Lettres.

In 2018, he is promoted, by the Minister of Culture Françoise Nyssen, commander in the Ordre des Arts et des Lettres.

== Works ==
- Propos-exutoires, Paris, Le Cherche midi, 1990 ISBN 2-8627-4174-4
- De l’aube à midi (From Dawn to Noon), Paris, Le Cherche midi, 1999 ISBN 2-8627-4637-1
- Variations Chopin : Quarante-huit préludes (Chopin Variations: Forty-eight Preludes), Vendœuvres, Lancosme éditeur, 2005 ISBN 2-9121-8427-4
- 111 notes d’amour : Variations (111 Love Notes: Variations), Paris, Le Cherche midi, 2008 ISBN 2-7491-1110-2
- Nuits de l’âme (Nights of the Soul), Paris, Le Cherche midi, 2009 ISBN 2-7491-1644-9
- Les Deux Âmes de Frédéric Chopin (The Two Souls of Frederic Chopin), first edition Paris, Presses de la Renaissance, 2010 ISBN 2-7509-0397-1; second edition Paris, Le Passeur éditeur, 2017 ISBN 2-3689-0531-6
- Franz Liszt : La Dispersion magnifique (Franz Liszt: The Magnificent Dispersion), Arles, Actes Sud, 2011 ISBN 2-7427-9523-5
- Le Chant de toi : Ode (The Song of You: Ode), Paris, Le Cherche midi, 2012 ISBN 2-7491-2757-2
- La Raison des sortilèges : Entretiens sur la musique (with Michel Onfray), first edition Paris, Autrement, 2013 ISBN 2-7467-3425-7; second edition Paris, Pluriel, 2015 ISBN 2-3689-0531-6
- Nietzsche au jour le jour : Un florilège pour tous et pour personne (Friedrich Nietzsche quotations), Paris, Le Passeur éditeur, 2013 ISBN 2-3689-0022-5
- De l’aube à midi : Aphorismes, Paris, Le Passeur éditeur, 2013 ISBN 2-3689-0047-0
- Suite lyrique (with the painter Jean-Marc Brunet), Paris, Le Passeur éditeur, 2013 ISBN 2-3689-0060-8
- Alexandre Scriabine : L'Ivresse des sphères, Arles, Actes Sud, ISBN 2-3300-3904-2
- Les pensées : Suivies du Dictionnaire des idées reçues (à partir de l’œuvre de Gustave Flaubert), Paris, Le Cherche midi, ISBN 2-7491-4510-4
- Glenn Gould ou le Piano de l’esprit, Arles, Actes Sud, 2016 ISBN 2-3300-6135-8

== Musical Adaptations of his Work ==
- The composer Pierre Thilloy set Jean-Yves Clément's aphorisms to music in his work Mysterium conjunctionis (2005) for seven instruments and a mezzo-soprano.
- Thilloy also wrote a setting of Le Chant de Toi (2014) for soprano and piano.
