= Nicolas Bacri =

French composer

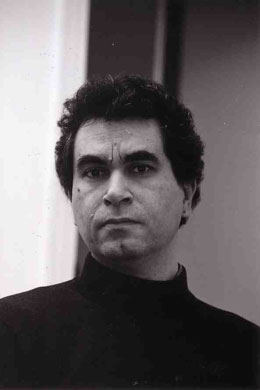
- Nicolas Bacri, 2006
- Born: 23 November 1961 (age 64); Paris, France
- Occupation: composer
- Website: www.nicolasbacri.net

Nicolas Bacri (born 23 November 1961) is a French composer who has written more than one hundred sixty works, including seven symphonies, eight cantatas, eleven string quartets, seven piano trios, five violin and piano sonatas and four violin concertos.

== Career ==
Nicolas Bacri was born in Paris, France. His musical studies began with piano lessons at the age of seven. He continued to study harmony, counterpoint, analysis and composition as a teenager with Françoise Levechin-Gangloff and Christian Manen. After 1979, he continued his studies with Louis Saguer. In 1980, Bacri entered the Conservatoire de Paris where he studied with Claude Ballif, Marius Constant, Serge Nigg, and Michel Philippot.

After graduating in 1983 with the premier prix in composition, he attended the French Academy in Rome. Back in Paris Bacri organized in Radio France.where he was artistic delegate of chamber music department from 1987 to 1991, the very first performance in France of the complete 15 string quartets cycle by Shostakovich (1989–90 season with the Manhattan String Quartet as a symbol of the end of cold war) and featured for the first time in France the major composers of Terezin: Pavel Haas, Gideon Klein, Hans Krasa and Viktor Ullmann. Since then, he has concentrated on free-lance composing, receiving commissions from major institutions and festivals around the world. Bacri taught orchestration at the Geneva Conservatory (HEM/HES) from 2005 to 2011. He regularly gives masterclasses in composition in France and abroad (in USA: Rochester Eastman School of music... Russia: Ekaterinburg Ural Academy and China: Beijing Conservatory, Nanjing, Hangzhou).

Bacri has received commissions in major musical fields: opera, symphony, concertante, vocal, choral and chamber music. In February 2020 Riccardo Muti conducted the world premiere of his Concertante Elegy for Bass Clarinet and Orchestra op. 150 "Ophelia's Tears," with soloist J. Lawrie Bloom, a piece commissioned by the Chicago Symphony Orchestra. Reviewing this performance, Howard Reich of the Chicago Tribune wrote: "The openly emotional writing for the bass clarinet (...) surely defied musical fashions of our noisy age."

In his book The Classical Revolution: Thoughts on New Music in the 21st Century, John Borstlap hailed Bacri as "the most important French composer since Messiaen and Dutilleux...". Bacri has been Professor of Composition at the Conservatoire à Rayonnement Régional (CRR) de Paris (October 2017-October 2023) and at the Schola Cantorum (Paris) (October 2018-October 2023).

Bacri's Symphony No. 6, Op. 60, was a finalist in the 2003 Masterprize international composing competition.

Bacri made his debut as conductor with the London Symphony Orchestra conducting the world premiere of his opus 130 titled A Day (Four Images for Orchestra) at L'Opéra of the Palace of Versailles in Paris on 8 September 2013. The symphonic suite, 29 minutes long, was written on commission for the son of South Korean businessman Yoo Byung-eun. It has been recorded at the Abbey Road Studios for a planned future release.

== Recordings ==
- Nicolas Bacri – Une Prière WDR Sinfonie Orchester Köln, Semyon Bychkov (conductor), Laurent Korcia (violin). RCA Red Seal, released 2004
- Nicolas Bacri – Sturm und Drang Concerto amoroso Le printemps for oboe, violin and string orchestra, Op.80; Concerto for Flute and Orchestra, Op.63; Concerto nostalgico L'automne for oboe, cello and string orchestra, Op.80 No.1; Nocturne for cello and string orchestra, Op.90; Symphony No.4 Sturm und Drang, Op.49. Tapiola Sinfonietta conducted by Jean-Jacques Kantorow. BIS Records CD-1579, released 2009.
- Nicolas Bacri – Piano Music (Reyes) – Piano Sonata No. 2 / Diletto classico / Prelude et Fugue / L'Enfance de l'art. Eliane Reyes (pianist). Naxos Records 8.572530, released 2011
- Zodiac Trio – Nicolas Bacri, "A Smiling Suite" (2007). Kliment Krylovskiy (clarinet), Vanessa Mollard (violin), Riko Higuma (piano). Recorded for the Blue Griffin Recording (BG 257) and released in 2012
- Nicolas Bacri – "LES QUATRE SAISONS" François Leleux (oboe), Valeryi Sokolov (violin), Adrien La Marca (viola), Sebastien Van Kuijk (cello), Orchestre Victor Hugo-Franche-Comté/Jean-François Verdier. Recorded for Klarthe and released in 2016 : http://www.klarthe.com/index.php/fr/enregistrements/les-quatre-saisons-detail
- Mysteries – Sabine Weyer – Nicolas Bacri, Piano Sonate No. 2 op. 105, Piano Sonata No. 3 op. 122 "Impetuosa", Fantasy op. 134, recorded for ARS Produktion, and released in 2021
- Brahms aujourd'hui – Agnès Pyka/Laurent Wagschal – Nicolas Bacri, Sonata No. 4 "in Anlehnung an Brahms" op. 148, for violin and piano, recorded for Klarthe
- Future Horizons – François Leleux/Lisa Batiashvili – Nicolas Bacri, Notturno for oboe & strings, op. 74. François Leleux (oboe), Andres Orozco-Esttrada (conductor), Frankfurt Radio Symphony. Recorded for Pentatone.
