= Sabine Weyer =

Luxembourgish pianist

Sabine Weyer (born 8 May 1988) is a pianist from Luxembourg. She is a professor of piano at the Conservatoire de la Ville de Luxembourg.

== Early life and education ==
Weyer was born in Luxembourg City, and started playing piano at the age of six. She studied in her home country at the Conservatoire de Musique Esch-sur-Alzette, then at the Conservatoire national régional (now the Conservatoire à rayonnement régional de Metz) in France with Bernard Lerouge where she received the Médaille d’or (2006) and the Prix de Perfectionnement with a unanimous jury (2007), and finally at the Koninklijk Conservatorium in Brussels with Aleksandar Madžar, where she received her master's degree and Postgraduate Diploma in piano performance. During her studies she trained with Oxana Yablonskaya, Mario Patuzzi, Michel Béroff, Vassil Guenov, Aquiles Delle Vigne and Françoise Buffet-Arsenijevic.

== Career ==
Weyer has performed internationally in such venues as the Berliner Philharmonie, the Shanghai Concert Hall, the Tonhalle in Zurich, the Salle Cortot in Paris, Philharmonie Luxembourg, and the Royal Albert Hall in London. She has performed with musicians such as Aleksey Semenenko, Pavel Vernikov, Mindaugas Backus, Alena Baeva, Svetlana Makarova, Yury Revich, Gary Hoffman and Julien Beaudiment.

She has been a professor of Piano at the Conservatoire de la Ville de Luxembourg since 2015, and has taught masterclasses at the Scriabin Summer Academy, the Beijing Normal University and the European Summer Music Academy.

Weyer has received several awards, including winning the Grand Prize Virtuoso Competition in 2015 at London's Royal Albert Hall. For her recordings she has received a Supersonic Award for Bach to the Future, a Pasticcio Prize (ORF) for A Light in The Dark, as well as nominations for the ICMAs and Opus Klassik awards.

== Recordings ==
- 2015 – Images, featuring works by Rameau and Debussy on the Orlando Records label
- 2016 – Bach-Mendelssohn, her first recording with ARS Produktion, who she records with today.
- 2017 – Bach to the Future, featuring works by J.S.Bach and transcriptions by Siloti, Busoni and Saint-Saens.
- 2018 – A Light in the Dark, a recording of Shostakovich works with the Nordwestdeutsche Philharmonie under Erich Polz
- 2021 – Mysteries, featuring the works of Nikolai Myaskovsky and Nicolas Bacri
