= Florentine Mulsant =

French composer (born 1962)

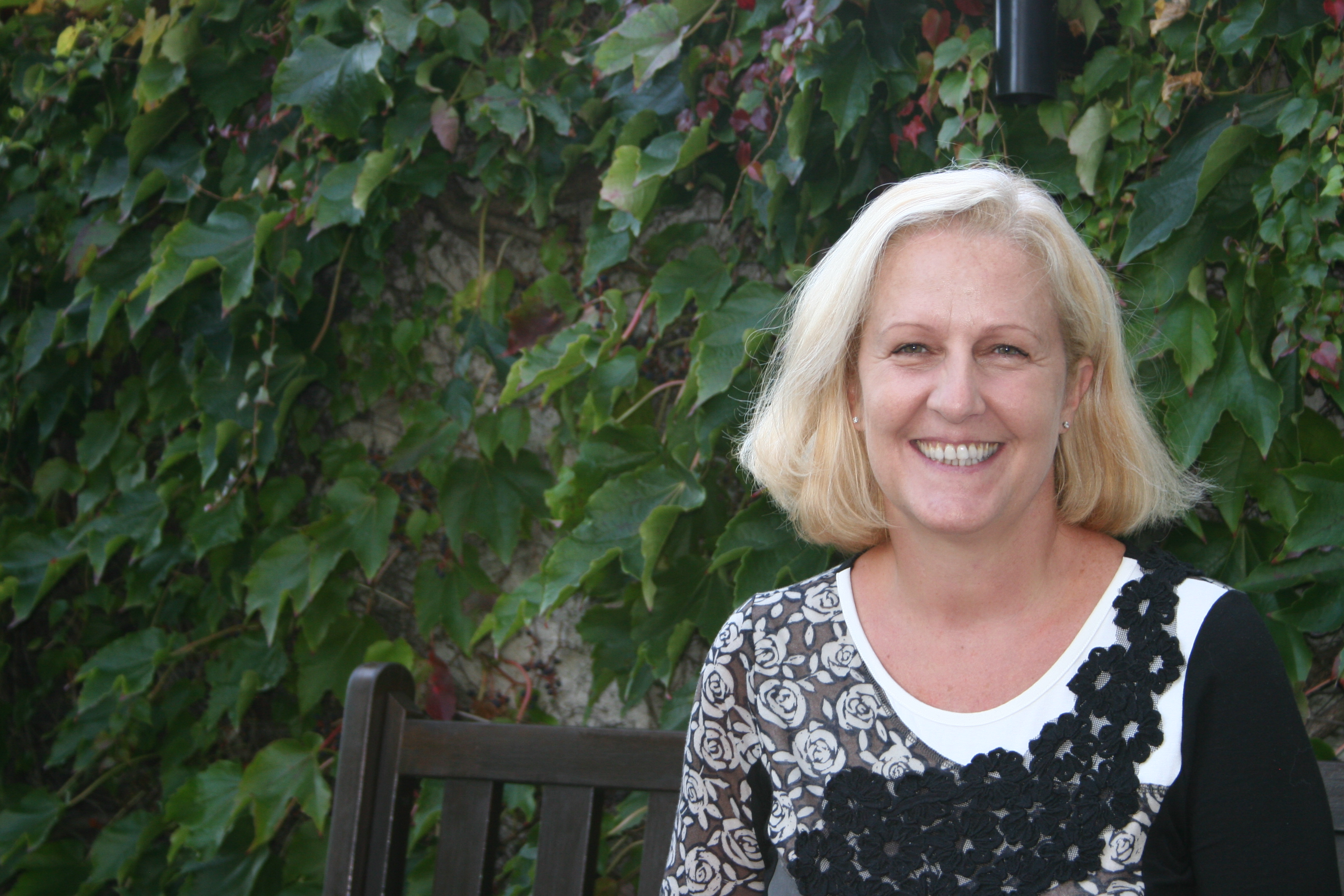
- Born: 27 March 1962; Dakar
- Awards: Chevalier des Arts et des Lettres (2019)
- Website: http://www.florentinemulsant.com

Florentine Mulsant (born 27 March 1962) is a French composer.

== Life ==
Born in Dakar, Mulsant studied harmony, counterpoint, fugue, musical analysis and orchestration at the Conservatoire de Paris and the Schola Cantorum de Paris, where she won a First Prize in 1987 for composition in Allain Gaussin's class. She followed the teaching of Franco Donatoni at the Accademia Musicale Chigiana and furthered her skill with Alain Bancquart.

== Selected works ==
- Amer, for piano, on a poem by Saint-John Perse, Op. 4
- Sonate de concert, for violin, Op. 19
- Sonate for viola and piano, Op. 20 (1999)
- Sonate for violin and piano, Op. 21 (1999/2000)
- In jubilo, quartet for clarinet, violin, cello and piano, Op. 22
- Trio for violin, cello and piano, Op. 23
- Quatuor à cordes, Op. 26 (Commission by Radio France, premiered by the Castagneri Quartet, 2004)
- Sonate for cello, Op. 27
- Quatuor avec piano, Op. 28
- Passacaille for piano, Op. 29
- Quintette à vent, Op. 30

== Bibliography ==
- Stéphanie Carne (2007). Association Femmes et Musique, Compositrices française au XXe siècle. Sampzon: Delatour. pp. 171–175. ISBN 978-2-7521-0043-6.
