= Gautier Capuçon =

French cellist

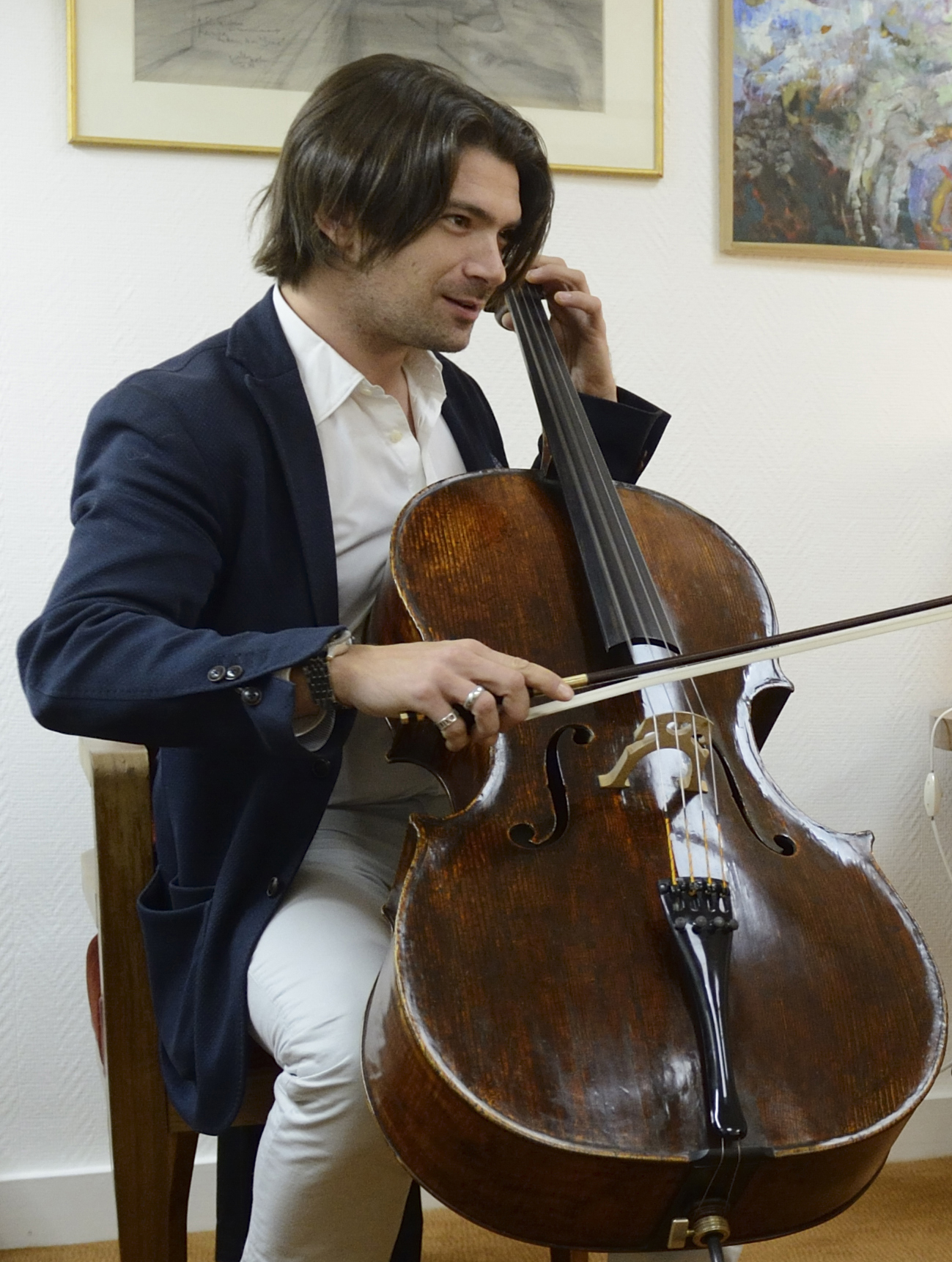
- Capuçon in 2015
- Born: 3 September 1981 (age 45); Chambéry, France
- Occupation: Classical cellist
- Years active: 1998–present
- Family: Renaud Capuçon (brother)
- Website: gautiercapucon.com

Gautier Capuçon (born 3 September 1981) is a French classical cellist who made an international career. He is the younger brother of violinist Renaud Capuçon.

== Early life ==
Gautier Capuçon was born in Chambéry, Savoie, on 3 September 1981, the youngest of three siblings. His brother is the violinist Renaud Capuçon.Capuçon started learning the cello when he was four years old under Augustin Lefèbvre. He also started learning piano at the age of seven with the aim to play jazz.

As a student, Capuçon played cello in the European Community Youth Orchestra (now the European Union Youth Orchestra) and also in the Gustav Mahler Jugendorchester, playing under conductors including Bernard Haitink, Pierre Boulez and Claudio Abbado.

Capuçon first studied at the Conservatoire à rayonnement régional de Chambéry where he graduated with first prizes in cello and piano. Then in Paris, he studied the cello initially with Annie Cochet-Zakine, who had heard him in Chambéry and brought him with her to the Conservatoire Supérieur de Paris (CNR). Capuçon then became a pupil of cello pedagogue Philippe Muller at the Conservatoire National Supérieur de Musique de Paris (CNSMP), where he graduated in 2000 with first prizes in cello and chamber music. He also studied piano as his second instrument under Christophe Egiziano. After that, he finished his studies with Heinrich Schiff at the University of Music and Performing Arts, Vienna.

== Career ==
Gautier Capuçon has performed and recorded music since the 2000s. His first recording was Ravel's Sonatas and Piano Trio with Renaud Capuçon and Frank Braley. In addition, Capuçon has featured in EMI's annual CD releases of live recordings from the Lugano Festival each year, "Martha Argerich & Friends", at which he is a frequent returning guest performer.

In 2014 he started a teaching program called the Classe d'Excellence de Violoncello with funding from the Fondation Louis Vuitton. The program was created for pre-professional graduate students and has featured musicians such as Margarita Balanas, Nathan Chan, Julia Hagen, and Stéphane Tétreault. He also became an ambassador for Orchestra à l'École in 2020. An organisation promoting orchestral music in schools.

This was succeeded by the Foundation Gautier Capuçon in 2022, which included financial scholarships, and permitted violinists, violists and pianists. The foundation is supported by the Fondation de France and alongside Capuçon, is headed by Frank Braley and Alain Altinoglu. Laureatues include Anastasia Rizikov.

Capuçon hosted the radio show Les Garnets de Gautier Capuçon on Radio Classique from 2019-2025. He has also been a judge on the French 2's annual children's talent show Prodiges, which features classical ballet and music, since 2014. Other television credits include an episode of Now Hear This on the American television network PBS, hosted by Scott Yoo; Symphony Pour la Vie; and The Artist Academy.

Un été en France (A Summer in France) is a series of concerts created by Capuçon that began in 2020. It features young artists, including those from his education programs.

== Cello ==
Capuçon's principal instrument is a 1701 Matteo Goffriller cello which he has on loan. The cello is named L'Ambassadeur and was loaned to him by "a private donor". He also has a 1746 José Contreras cello on loan from BSI (Banca della Svizzera Italiana).

Speaking about his Goffriller cello in April 2008, he said:

I am very lucky to be playing this cello for ten, nearly eleven, years now. It is a Matteo Goffriller, of the Venetian school, from 1701. All the Goffriller cellos that I have tried are not easy to play. For each note you need to know how much bow pressure, how much vibrato and how much bow speed you can put on it. It is an instrument that you really need to know to be able to play; it is not like a Montagnana or a Stradivarius. Montagnana, for example – most of them are really easy to play. So in a way, on the Goffriller, I probably search more and look more for different things.

Describing a Montagnana cello as his "dream" instrument of choice, he said: "I hope one day to be able to play on a Montagnana."

== Awards ==
- 1998: Maurice Ravel International Academy of Music Competition - First Prize
- 1999: Adam International Cello Competition - Second Prize
- 1999: André Navarra International Cello Competition - First Prize
- 2001: Victoires de la Musique Classique - New Talent of the Year
- 2004: Borletti-Buitoni Trust Award
- 2004: ECHO Klassik Award - Young Artist of the Year
- 2007: ECHO Klassik Award - Chamber Music Recording of the Year (20th/21st Century)
- 2011: ECHO Klassik Award - Concerto Recording of the Year
- 2012: ECHO Klassik Award - Chamber Music Recording of the Year (19th Century/Mixed Ensemble)

== Discography ==
Gautier Capuçon was an exclusive recording artist for Virgin Classics (a division of EMI). In 2015 he recorded for Erato, a division of Warner Music Group.

=== Orchestral ===
- Dvorak – Cello Concerto, 2009
- Herbert – Cello Concerto no.2, 2009
- Haydn – Cello Concertos, 2003
- Brahms – Double Concerto, 2007
- Tchaikovsky – Variations on a Rococo Theme, 2010
- Prokofiev – Sinfonia Concertante, 2010
- Brahms – Double Concerto, 2011
- Saint-Saëns - Cello Concerto n°1, 2013
- Shostakovich – Cello Concertos, 2015
- Schumann - Cello Concerto, 2019

=== Chamber ===
- Ravel – Chamber Music, 2002
- Face à Face: Violin & Cello Duets, 2003
- Saint Saëns – Carnival of the Animals, 2003
- Brahms Piano Trios, 2004
- Schubert – Trout Quintet, 2004
- Inventions: Violin & Cello Duets (Bach, Eisler, Karol Beffa, Bartok, Martinu), 2006
- Schubert Piano Trios, 2007
- Rachmaninov & Prokofiev: Cello Sonatas, 2008
- Fauré: Complete chamber music for strings, 2011

=== Other albums ===
He also released these albums:

Year	Album	Peak positions					Notes
Year	Album	FRA	BEL (Fl)	BEL (Wa)	NLD	SWI	Notes
2018	Intuition	52	117	101	102	78	
2020	Emotions	20	–	57	–	–	
2021	Souvenirs	70	–	121	–	–	
2022	Sensations	4	–	49	–	62	
2023	Destination Paris	–	–	93	–	–	

=== Collaborations ===
Date	album title	Credited to
2013	Gautier Capuçon plays Schubert, Schumann, Debussy & Britten	Gautier Capuçon / Frank Braley
2013	Saint-Saëns: La muse et le poète	Renaud Capuçon / Gautier Capuçon / Orchestre Philharmonique de Radio France / Lionel Bringuier
2013	Schubert: Arpeggione	Gautier Capuçon / Frank Braley
2015	Shostakovich: The Cello Concertos	Gautier Capuçon / Mariinsky Orchestra / Valery Gergiev
2016	Schubert: String Quintet, Op. 163 & Lieder	Quatuor Ébène / Gautier Capuçon / Matthias Goerne
2016	Beethoven: Complete Works for Cello & Piano	Gautier Capuçon / Frank Braley
2017	Szymanowski: Concert Overture, Op. 12 - Lutosławski: Cello Concerto & Symphony No. 4	Polish National Radio Symphony Orchestra / Gautier Capuçon / Alexander Liebreich
2019	Franck - Chopin	Gautier Capuçon / Yuja Wang

=== DVDs ===
Date	album title	Credited to
2013	The European Concert - Brahms / Haydn / Beethoven (as DVD)	Gautier Capuçon / Berliner Philharmoniker / Gustavo Dudamel

== Management ==
Gautier Capuçon is represented by:

- France: Agence Artistique Jacques Thelen, Paris
- UK: Harrison Parrott
- Germany: Weigold & Böhm
- North America: Columbia Artists Management Inc., New York
- Japan: Kajimoto Concert Management, Tokyo

== Personal life ==
Capuçon was married to French concert cellist Delphine Borsarello from 2007 to 2024. The pair have two daughters, Fée and Sissi, who also play music.

Capuçon enjoys playing jazz piano recreationally.

He had an appendectomy in 2009 that caused him to cancel a concert with the San Francisco Symphony
