= Gérard Caussé =

French violist (born 1948)

Gérard Caussé (born 26 June 1948, Toulouse, France) is a French violist.

He gave the first performance of the celebrated Ainsi la nuit quartet by Henri Dutilleux. The first movement of Gérard Grisey's celebrated work, Les Espaces Acoustiques ("Prologue"), is inscribed "à Gérard Caussé." His discography amounts to thirty recordings. Gerard Caussé plays a viola made by Gasparo da Salo in 1560.

== Career ==
Caussé has shared the stage in both orchestral and chamber music with musicians such as Augustin Dumay, Emmanuel Krivine, Charles Dutoit, and Kent Nagano.

His recordings include more than thirty-five issued under labels such as EMI, Erato and Philips. Caussé is holder of the Banco Bilbao Vizcaya Argentaria Chair of Viola at the Escuela Superior de Música Reina Sofía.
