= Augustin Dumay =

French violinist and conductor

Augustin Dumay (born 17 January 1949) is a French violinist and conductor from Paris.

== Biography ==
Dumay was invited as a soloist to appear with Yo-Yo Ma in Paris by Herbert von Karajan. Later on, he performed Béla Bartók's Second Concerto with Colin Davis and Berlin Philharmonic Orchestra where he stayed. During those times he also worked for the New Japan Philharmonic, the Orchestre de la Suisse Romande, the London Symphony Orchestra, the Royal Concertgebouw Orchestra, the Los Angeles Philharmonic, the Montreal Symphony Orchestra, the Warsaw Philharmonic, and the even Mahler Chamber Orchestra. He also appeared with such notable German conductors as Kurt Masur, Kurt Sanderling, Wolfgang Sawallisch, Christoph von Dohnányi, along with Seiji Ozawa of Japan, Charles Dutoit of Switzerland, Gennadi Rozhdestvensky of Russia, and French ones such as Marc Minkowski and Emmanuel Krivine. Dumay appeared in various music halls including Wigmore, Victoria, Suntory Hall of Tokyo, and the Queen Elizabeth Hall.

From 2003 to 2012 he is a principal conductor of the Orchestre Royal de Chambre de Wallonie with which he travels throughout Europe. During the same year he had collaborated with such orchestras as the Camerata Salzburg, Orchestre de Picardie, the Orchestre d’Auvergne, the English Chamber Orchestra and many others. From 2002 to 2005 he served as a director of the arts at the Menton Festival de Musique and became a professor at the Queen Elisabeth Music Chapel, where he taught many young violinists. He also has many award-winning recordings. His music was published by such companies as EMI and Deutsche Grammophon and have won many awards for him such as the Gramophone Award, Grammy and Victoires de la Musique. Currently he works with both the Chinese and Rotterdam Philharmonic Orchestras, the Berliner Symphoniker, the Orchestre de Chambre de Lausanne, and many others. He plays a 1743 Guarnerius del Gesu, which was the violin of Leonid Kogan.
