= Sandrine Piau =

French soprano

- Born: 5 June 1965 (age 61); Issy-les-Moulineaux, France
- Occupation: Soprano
- Years active: 1990—present
- Website: www.sandrinepiau.com

Sandrine Piau (born 5 June 1965) is a French soprano. She is particularly renowned in Baroque music although also excels in Romantic and modernist art songs. She has the versatility to perform works from Vivaldi, Handel, Mozart to Schumann, Debussy, and Poulenc. In addition to an active career in concerts and operas, she is prolific in studio recordings, primarily with Harmonia Mundi, Naïve, and Alpha since 2018.

== Biography ==
Born in Issy-les-Moulineaux, she initially studied harp and turned to singing at the Conservatoire de Paris. After meeting William Christie, she commenced her exposure to Baroque music and their collaboration notably at the Aix-en-Provence Festival. She pursued further vocal studies with Rachel Yakar and René Jacobs.

She collaborated with many of the leading European conductors of the Baroque revival, including Marc Minkowski, Philippe Herreweghe, Paul McCreesh, Alan Curtis, Christophe Rousset, René Jacobs, and Fabio Biondi.

Piau also excels in operatic roles from other eras. She has sung Mozart roles such as Pamina in The Magic Flute, Servilla in La clemenza di Tito, Konstanze in Die Entführung aus dem Serail, Donna Anna in Don Giovanni. She has taken up French roles such as Mélisande in Pelléas et Mélisande, Sister Constance in Dialogues des Carmelites, and made forays into romantic roles including Ännchen in Weber's Der Freischütz, Nannetta in Verdi's Falstaff, Wanda in Offenbach's La Grande-Duchesse de Gérolstein, and Sophie in Massenet's Werther.

She participated in an opening concert of the Elbphilharmonie on 12 January 2017, where she sang Berg's Seven Early Songs.

She was named a Chevalier of the Ordre des Arts et des Lettres in 2006 by the French government. She won the "Singer of the year" (Artiste lyrique de l'année) in the Victoires de la musique classique in 2009.

== Recordings ==
Most recordings can be found on the discography section of official website.

=== Early recordings ===
Her early recordings under Harmonia Mundi include collaborations with William Christie and his ensemble Les Arts Florissants. They recorded Purcell's The Fairy-Queen, Luigi Rossi's Orfeo, Campra's Idoménée, Monteverdi's Il combattimento di Tancredi e Clorinda and his madrigals, various operas by Rameau (Les Indes galantes, Pygmalion/Nélée et Myrthis, Castor et Pollux), in addition to sacred works including Michel Richard Delalande's Te Deum, his petits motets, and Handel's Messiah. She appeared in other recordings, which include André Caplet: Conte fantastique, Septuor prières (1992), Mendelssohn's A Midsummer Night's Dream (1994) conducted by Philippe Herreweghe, and Frank Martin's Le Vin herbé (2007) conducted by Daniel Reuss. Some recordings with Christie were released on other labels: Purcell's King Arthur (1995, Erato Records) and Handel's Serse (2004, Virgin Classics).

Piau has also collaborated frequently with Christophe Rousset and his ensemble Les Talens Lyrique. Their first recordings were Henry Du Mont: Motets en dialogue, published by Centre de Musique Baroque de Versailles and reissued by Virgin Classics, and Pascal Collasse's Cantiques spirituels de Racine under Erato/Radio France. They recorded Handel's Riccardo Primo (1996), Mondonville's Les fêtes de Paphos (1997) on L'Oiseau-Lyre. On Decca Records, they made recordings of Mozart's Mitridate, re di Ponto (1999), Couperin: Leçons de ténèbres, Motets, Magnificat (2000), and sacred works by Leonardo Leo (2002).

Her earliest recording on Virgin Classics was Rameau's Pygmalion (1993) with Hervé Niquet and his ensemble Le Concert Spirituel. She collaborated with Gérard Lesne and his ensemble Il Seminario Musicale in sacred music, including Charpentier: Leçons de ténèbres, motets by Alessandro Stradella, Alessandro Scarlatti's cantatas, and his other works such as Stabat Mater. She also worked with various conductors, including Christophe Coin (Rameau: Cantates profanes, pièces en concert), Alan Curtis (Rodrigo), Christophe Rousset (Couperin: Motets), William Christie, Emmanuelle Haïm (Aci, Galatea e Polifemo), Marc Minkowski (Offenbach's La Grande-Duchesse de Gérolstein, released on both CD and DVD).

=== Naïve Records ===
Piau has made discography on Naïve Records the most, in genres across operas, sacred works, and art songs. Earlier, she had recorded on independent labels now owned by Naïve.

- Handel: Arie e duetti d'amore with Gloria Banditelli (1996). Europa Galante, Fabio Biondi (Opus 111)
- Opera Arias by Mozart (2002). Freiburger Barockorchester, Gottfried von der Goltz (Astrée)

She appeared in several releases on the Vivaldi Edition: Arie d'Opéra (Federico Maria Sardelli, 2005), In furore, Laudate pueri, Concerti sacri (Ottavio Dantone, 2006), Atenaide (Sardelli, 2007), La fida ninfa (Jean-Christophe Spinosi, 2009). Several tracks are included in her solo compilation Vivaldi! (2010).

She had dedicated to works by Handel: Opera Seria, opera arias by Handel (Christophe Rousset, 2004), Between Heaven & Earth, oratorio arias by Handel (Stefano Montarini, 2009). She was partnered by Sara Mingardo in Handel: Arias & Duets (2008), with Rinaldo Alessandrini and his Concerto Italiano. The creative team united for Un Viaggio a Roma, released in 2018. In 2012, she recorded Le Triomphe de L'amour, consisting French baroque arias with Jérôme Correas and his ensemble Les Paladin, with whom she had worked on Cavalli's L'Ormindo (Pan Classics, 2006), and even earlier on Cantates & duos italiens by Handel (Arion, 2000). Year 2014 saw the release of her Mozart album Desperate Heroines conducted by Ivor Bolton.

Piau collaborated with Laurence Equibey and her choir Accentus in sacred music, including Brahms' Ein deutsches Requiem (2003), Haydn's The Seven Last Words of Christ (2006), Fauré's Requiem/Cantique de Jean Racine (2008), Christus/Chorale Cantates by Mendelssohn (2011), Mozart's Requiem (2014). One exception was Mozart's Great Mass in C minor, K. 427 (2005), where Accentus was conducted by Emmanuel Krivine. The team released Mozart's Coronation Mass & Vesperae solennes de confessore (2017) on Erato Records.

She recorded her first art song solo recital Mélodies by Debussy (2003) accompanied by Jos Van Immerseel. Further song recitals are Évocation, songs by Chausson, Strauss, Debussy, Zemlinsky, Koechlin (2007), and Après un Rêve, songs by Fauré, Poulenc, Britten (2011), both accompanied by Susan Manoff. Her lieder performances can also be seen in Quatuor Diotima's Schoenberg, Berg, Webern (2016), and joint album Schubert: Arpeggione & Lieder (2017).

She was featured in mezzo-soprano Anne Sofie von Otter's baroque album Sogno Barocco (2012), and cellist Anne Gastinel's Americas (2015), where she sang No. 1 and 5 of Villa-Lobos' Bachianas Brasileiras. She provided vocals in film soundtracks of The First Cry (2007) and Home (2009), both composed by Armand Amar.

=== Recordings on other labels ===
Piau made occasional appearances on labels such as Deutsche Harmonia Mundi, Saphir Productions. She can be seen on Opera Rara's 2000 release of Viardot's Cendrillon. Her concert performance in Mozart's Zaide with Ton Koopman was released on Brilliant Classics. She also took part in his Bach cantatas project with his Amsterdam Baroque Orchestra & Choir, released on Challenge Records. She collaborated with Paul McCreesh in Haydn's Die Schöpfung, released on Archiv Produktion in 2008. She interpreted Britten's Les Illuminations in Unknown Britten, joined by Northern Sinfonia conducted by Thomas Zehetmair, released by NMC Recordings in 2009.

- Haydn: Harmoniemesse, Te Deum (1996). Chœur de chambre de Namur, La Petite Bande, Sigiswald Kuijken (dhm)
- Maurice Delage: Les Mélodies with Jean-Paul Fouchécourt (1998). Jean-François Gardeil, Billy Eidi (Timpani)
- Louis-Nicolas Clérambault: Soprano Cantatas and Sonatas (1998). (Naxos)
- Mozart: Une Soirée chez les Jacquin (1999). (Zig Zag Territories)
- Valls: Missa Scala Aretina / Biber: Requiem f minor (2002). Nederlandse Bachvereniging, Gustav Leonhardt (dhm)
- Albert Roussel: Intégrale des œuvres pour flûte (2006). (Saphir)
- Chausson: Concert Op.21, Chanson perpétuelle Op.37, Quatuor Op.35 (2010). with Régis Pasquier, Philippe Bianconi, Parisii Quartet (Saphir)
- Debussy, Poulenc, Ravel, Roussel: Musique français pour flûte (2012). (Saphir)
- Paris – Madrid (2018). with Liat Cohen, Rolando Villazón, Charles Castronovo (Erato)
- Ignaz Holzbauer: Tod der Dido (Singspiel in einem Aufzug) (2018). Barockorchester Stuttgart, Frieder Bernius (Carus-Verlag)

Piau was featured in "Chagall Duet" on Jon Anderson's 1994 album Change We Must.

=== Aparté and Alpha ===
Piau's first Aparté recording is Handel's Scipione (2010) with Christophe Rousset, with whom she later collaborated in Rameau's Zaïs (2015), Mozart's Betulia liberata (2020). The label also saw her collaboration with Ophélie Gaillard and her ensemble Pulcinella: Bach Arias (2012), Boccherini, Cello Concertos, Stabat Mater & Quintet (2019); their first recording collaboration was in her 2007 album Boccherini: Madrid released on Ambroisie. She features in Julien Chauvin's Haydn: La Reine – Haydn, Rigel, Sarti, J.C. Bach (2016).

- Messiah (Handel) (1754 Version) (2017). Le Concert Spirituel, Hervé Niquet (Alpha)
- Stabat Mater (Pergolesi) (2020). Christopher Lowrey. Christophe Rousset (Alpha)
- Julian Prégardien : Dichterliebe (2019). Éric Le Sage. (Alpha)
- 2018: Chimère, songs by Schumann, Loewe, Barber, Wolf, Previn, Debussy, Poulenc; with Susan Manoff, piano (Alpha)
- 2019: Si j'ai aimé; Julien Chauvin, Le concert de la Loge (Alpha)
- 2021: Clair-Obscur; songs by Strauss, Berg and Zemlinsky; Orchestre Victor Hugo Franche-Comté, Jean-François Verdier (Alpha)

=== DVDs ===
Note: filming year is indicated in this section

- 1994: Monteverdi: L'incoronazione di Poppea (as Amore, Damigella). Christophe Rousset, De Nederlandse Opera (Opus Arte)
- 2000: Handel: Serse (as Atalanta). Les Talens Lyriques, Christophe Rousset, Semperoper (Euroarts)
- 2003: Mozart: Sacred Arias. Christophe Rousset, Festival de Saint-Denis (Armide)
- 2004: Rameau: Les Paladins (as Nérine). Les Arts Florissants, William Christie, Théâtre du Châtelet (Opus Arte)
- 2004: Massenet: Werther (as Sophie /concert performance). Orchestre national du Capitole de Toulouse, Michel Plasson, Théâtre du Châtelet (Virgin/DTS)
- 2005: Prokofiev: L'amour des trois oranges (as Ninette). Rotterdam Philharmonic Orchestra, Stéphane Denève, De Nederlandse Opera (Opus Arte)
- 2006: A Mozart Celebration from Stephansdom. Chorus Viennensis, Vienna Boys' Choir, Vienna Radio Symphony Orchestra, Bertrand de Billy (Euroarts)
- 2012: Poulenc: Dialogues des Carmélites (as Sœur Constance). Philharmonia Orchestra, Jérémie Rhorer, Théâtre des Champs-Élysées (Erato)
- 2015: Handel: Alcina (as Alcina); Tamerlano (not featured). Christophe Rousset, La Monnaie (Alpha)
