= Jérôme Correas =

French conductor, harpsichordist and bass baritone

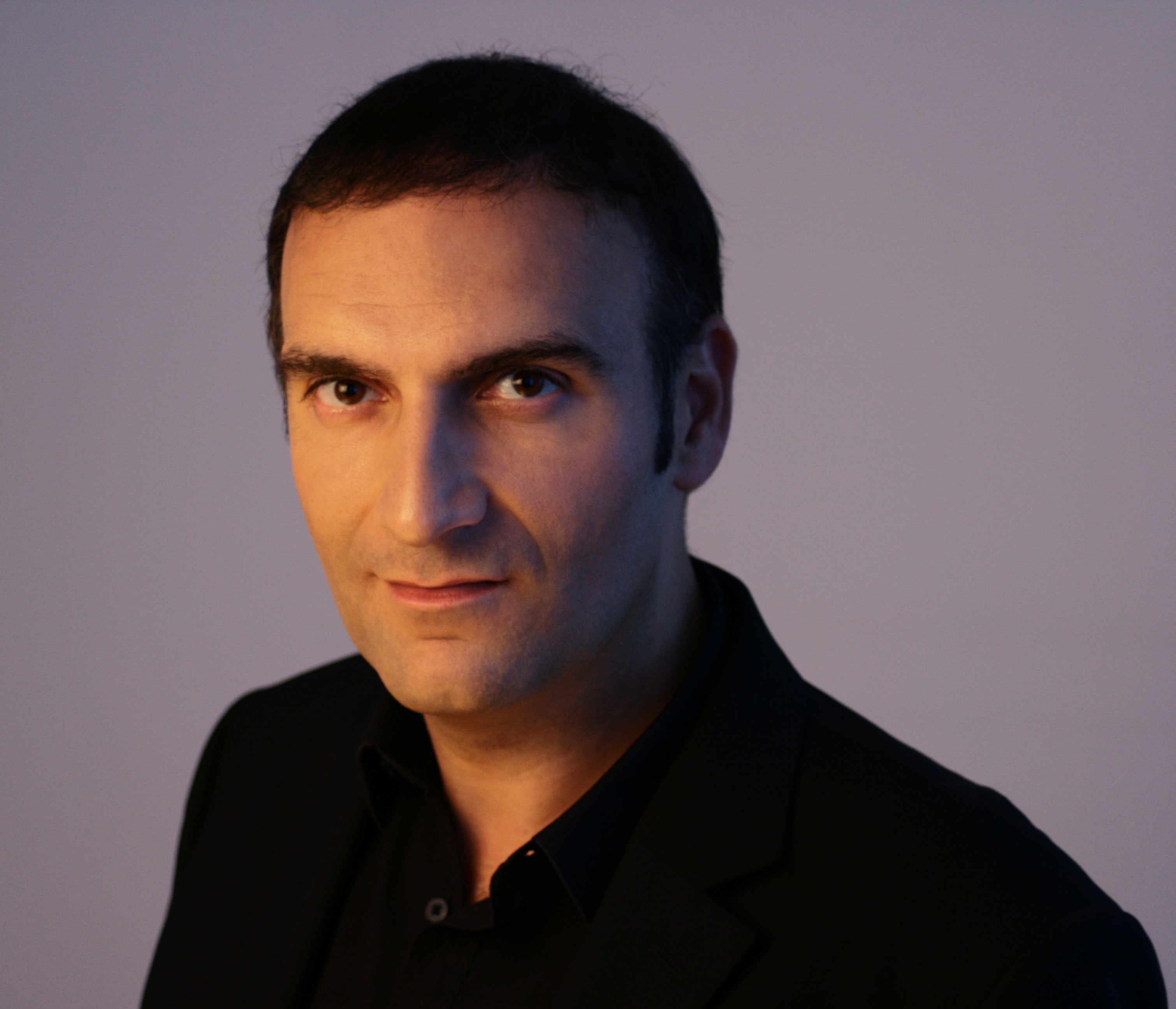
- Jérôme Correas in 2008
- Born: August 3, 1966 (age 60); Les Lilas, France
- Occupations: Conductor, Harpsichordist, Bass Baritone
- Known for: Musical career in conducting, harpsichord, and singing

Jérôme Correas (born 3 August 1966) is a French conductor, harpsichordist and bass baritone.

== Life ==
Born in Les Lilas, at the age of five Correas began studying the piano. In 1982, he met the great harpsichordist and musicologist Antoine Geoffroy-Dechaume with whom he began studying harpsichord and baroque style. After studying hypokhâgne and khâgne at the Lycée Malherbe in Caen, he obtained a degree in history and a degree in art history at the Sorbonne in 1986, and began singing in parallel with his studies.

His meeting with William Christie in 1987 was decisive: he entered the Conservatoire de Paris in his Baroque music class and obtained the first prize, then continued his studies in Xavier Depraz' opera class.

A member of the Arts Florissants from 1988 to 1993, he worked in 1991 with René Jacobs at the Studio-Versailles Opéra and was passionate about voice and operatic repertoire. On the advice and recommendation of Régine Crespin, he entered the École d' Art Lyrique of the Paris Opéra in 1991 and remained there until 1993. He diversified his singing activities by devoting himself to baroque music, opera, and French melodie which he practiced until 2008 (especially in the United States) with pianists Jean-Claude Pennetier, Jean-François Heisser, Marie-Josèphe Jude, Philippe Bianconi.

He sings, among others, under the direction of William Christie, Jean-Claude Malgoire, Michel Corboz, Sigiswald Kuijken, and also Jesus Lopez Cobos, Donato Renzetti and Marek Janowski, Philippe Entremont, Marco Guidarini, Gabriel Garrido, Christophe Rousset, Christophe Coin.

In 2001, he founded Les Paladins, with whom he explores the repertoires of the 17th and 18th centuries. His work focuses on the theatricality of the voice and the expressiveness of the instruments, as he is passionate about theatre and the stage.

He gradually gave up his singing career to keep only recital and recordings before going into opera with Les Paladins.

He is also a professor of baroque vocal style at the Conservatoire de Toulouse.

== Selected discography ==
=== Jérôme Correas, baritone ===
- Castor et Pollux by Rameau, with Les Arts Florissants conducted by William Christie, at Harmonia Mundi
- Les Indes Galantes by Rameau, with Les Arts Florissants conducted by William Christie, at Harmonia Mundi
- Nélée et Myrthis by Rameau, with Les Arts Florissants conducted by William Christie, at Harmonia Mundi
- The Fairy-Queen by Purcell, with Les Arts Florissants conducted by William Christie, at Harmonia Mundi
- Les Grands Motets by Mondonville, with l'ensemble baroque de Limoges conducted by Christophe Coin, at Astrée
- La Bonne Chanson by Fauré, with Monique Desjardins, Philippe Bianconi and the Parisii Quartet, at Pierre Verany
- El retablo de maese Pedro by Falla, with l'orchestre régional de Poitou-Charentes, conducted by Jean-François Heisser, at Mirare

=== Jérôme Correas conducting Les Paladins ===
- Molière à l'Opéra (Charpentier, Lully) at Glossa
- Tenebris, Leçons de ténèbres by Michel, Dumont, De Brossard, Michel, Couperin, Bernier, at Cyprès Records
- Le Triomphe de l'Amour, with Sandrine Piau, at Naïve Records
- Cantates et duos italiens by Haendel, with Sandrine Piau, at Arion
- Apollo e Dafne by Haendel, at Arion
- Leçons de Ténèbres by Porpora, at Arion
- Histoires Sacrées by Carissimi, at Pan Classics
- Serpentes Ignei In Deserto (never before released on disc) by Hasse, at Ambronay Éditions
- Madrigali e Dialoghi by Domenico Mazzocchi, at Pan Classics
- Ormindo by Cavalli, at Pan Classics
- Soleils Baroques by Rossi and Marazzoli, at Ambronay Éditions
