= Jean-François Novelli =

French opera singer

Jean-François Novelli (born in 1970) is a contemporary French tenor born in Fontainebleau.

== Career ==
Novelli holds a master's degree in musicology in the Sorbonne, winner of the Concours général and first prize for recorder, and turns to singing. He graduated from the Conservatoire de Paris after receiving the teachings of A-M Bondi, Rachel Yakar, Christiane Patard and was immediately admitted to postgraduate studies.

Noticed, he is one of the young talents selected for the midem of Cannes. Fascinated by baroque music, he won the First Prize of the Sinfonia competition in 1997 with Patricia Petibon and the Amarillis ensemble (jury présided by Gustav Leonhardt).

He perfected his skills with the tenor Howard Crook and collaborated with the principal French formations specialized in the repertoires of the 17th and 18th centuries: Il Seminario Musicale, Les Arts Florissants, les Talens Lyriques, Le Concert Spirituel, Le Poème Harmonique, the Éléments, the Ensemble Jacques Moderne, Les Paladins etc.

== Discography ==
- Armida abbandonata by Jommelli
- Motets de Danielis et Motets de Leo under the direction of Christophe Rousset
- Motets by Scarlatti and Oratorios by Charpentier with Gérard Lesne
- Les quatre saisons by Boismortier with the festes Vénitiennes
- Amour et Mascarade around Purcell, with Patricia Petibon and the ensemble Amarillis.
- Marc-Antoine Charpentier, Trois Histoires sacrées, Mors Saülis et Jonathae H.403, Sacrificium Abrahae H.402, Dialogus inter angelum et pastores H.406, Il Seminario Musicale, dir. Gérard Lesne. CD Astrée Naïve 2000/2001. "choc" du Monde de la Musique, ffff de Télérama)
- Marc-Antoine Charpentier (1673-1704) – Molière: Hommage pastoral au Roi Soleil et autres grivoiseries with Cassandre Berthon and Valérie Gabail (sopranos), Robert Getchell (French-style haute-contre), Jean-Baptiste Dumora (basse taille) and the Amarillis ensemble. CD Ambroisie 2004
- Grands motets of Dumont with the Ricercar Consort of Philippe Pierlot
- Works by Berlioz with Jérôme Correas and Arthur Schoonderwoerd
- Nova Metamorphosis: a program centered around Monteverdi and another one Boesset with Le Poème Harmonique
- Jephté by Carissimi under the direction of Joël Suhubiette with the ensemble Les Éléments
- Un programme Carrissimi with "Les Paladins" of Jérôme Correas
- Un programme Charpentier with the mastership of Versailles and Olivier Schneebelli
- Tirannique Empire..., cantatas by Jean-Baptiste Stuck with the ensemble Les Lunaisiens.
- FRANCE 1789, Révolte en musique d'un sans-culotte et d'un royaliste with the ensemble Les Lunaisiens
