= Aparté =

- Founded: 2010
- Founder: Nicolas Bartholomée
- Distributor(s): PIAS
- Genre: Classical
- Country of origin: France
- Location: Pantin
- Official website: www.apartemusic.com

Aparté is a French classical music record label founded in 2010 by Nicolas Bartholomée, director of Little Tribeca recording studios. Bartholomée had earlier founded the recording studio Musica Numeris in the late 1980s, and the Ambroisie label in 1999, later sold to Naïve Records.

== Artists ==
Soloists :

- Christophe Rousset (harpsichord)
- Ophélie Gaillard (cello)
- Michel Dalberto (piano)
- Pierre Génisson (clarinet)
- Romain Leleu (trumpet)
- Alexis Kossenko (flute)
- Julien Chauvin (violin)
- Atsushi Sakai (viola da gamba)
- Blandine Verlet (harpsichord)
- Gottfried von der Goltz (violin)
- Emmanuel Ceysson (harp)
- Dasol Kim (piano)

Singers :

- Xavier Sabata
- Sandrine Piau
- Karine Deshayes
- Julie Fuchs
- Lea Desandre
- Veronique Gens
- Tassis Christoyannis
- Sabine Devieilhe
- Stéphane Degout
- Teodora Gheorghiu
- Marianne Crebassa

Ensembles :

- Les Talens Lyriques
- London Philharmonic Orchestra
- BBC Symphony Orchestra
- Orchestre de chambre de Paris
- Orchestre d'Auvergne
- Orchestre Philharmonique de Monte-Carlo
- Les Ambassadeurs
- Le Concert de la Loge
- Les Cris de Paris
- Ensemble Contraste
