= Cantilena (disambiguation) =

A cantilena is a vocal melody or instrumental passage in a smooth, lyrical style. The term may also refer to:

- Bachianas Brasileiras No. 5 by Heitor Villa-Lobos
- Cantilena (album), jazz album by First House
- Cantilena Antiqua, an Italian early music ensemble
- Cantilena Chamber Players, a chamber music ensemble active in the 1980s
- Cantilenae Intelectuales de Phoenice Redivivo, a 17th-century alchemical book
- Il-Kantilena, the oldest known literary text in Maltese
- Salv'a lo vescovo senato, also known as the Cantilena giullaresca, a 12th-century Tuscan poem
