= Mourad Amirkhanian =

Armenian lyric artist residing in France

Mourad Amirkhanian (born 6 July 1974) is an Armenian lyric artist residing in France, who has been performing under the name Adam Barro since 2015.

== Life ==
Born in Gyumri, after his studies and specialization at the Higher Conservatory of Armenia, this young bass-baritone, graduated from the École normale de musique de Paris en 2004. He also attended master-classes by prestigious masters such as José van Dam, Renata Scotto, François le Roux, Caroline Dumas, Mireille Alcantara and Dalton Baldwin. Several concerts, including a recital held in February 2006 at the Salle Cortot in Paris, with the participation of soprano Claire Parizot and pianist Genc Tukiçi, have established him as one of the most promising international artists of his generation in the music world.

== Work ==
Amirkhanian recorded Verdi's Rigoletto in cinematographic version as Sparafucile (DVD issued in 2003) and Samson and Delilah as Abimelech (DVD issued in 2007).

On 23 November 2008, he participated with several other artists and the Euridys chamber orchestra in the souvenir gala held at the Cathédrale Sainte-Croix de Paris to commemorate the 20th anniversary of the 1988 Armenian earthquake.

In order to make lyrical music accessible to as many people as possible, he created the Fa-Sol-La association in 2006, which made it possible, among other things, to organize a concert in memory of the 1988 earthquake in Armenia.

On December 8, 2013, he performed, with the cellist Dominique de Williencourt, salle Gaveau in Paris, at a recital entitled "Merci la France ! It is Armenia that remembers - 25 years later.... The earthquake in Armenia".

In 2017, he was one of the founding members of the InterHallier Center.

In February 2018, he won the first prize 2018 in the international performing arts festival and competition "Stars of the Albion" (professional category).

In September 2019, with the soprano Anna Kasyan, he was the head of the concert organized in tribute to Komitas in the Church of the Madeleine in Paris.

In May 2024, he is "the prophet" in The Apocalypse of Icare, an opera in four scenes by Dominique de Williencourt, in world premiere in Paris, at the Cirque d'hiver.

== See also ==
- Mourad Amirkhanian: "Une respiration commune pour un effet singulier et magique", in Piano ma non solo, Jean-Pierre Thiollet, Anagramme éditions, Paris, 2012, p. 47–52.
