= Karine Deshayes =

French mezzo-soprano (born 1973)

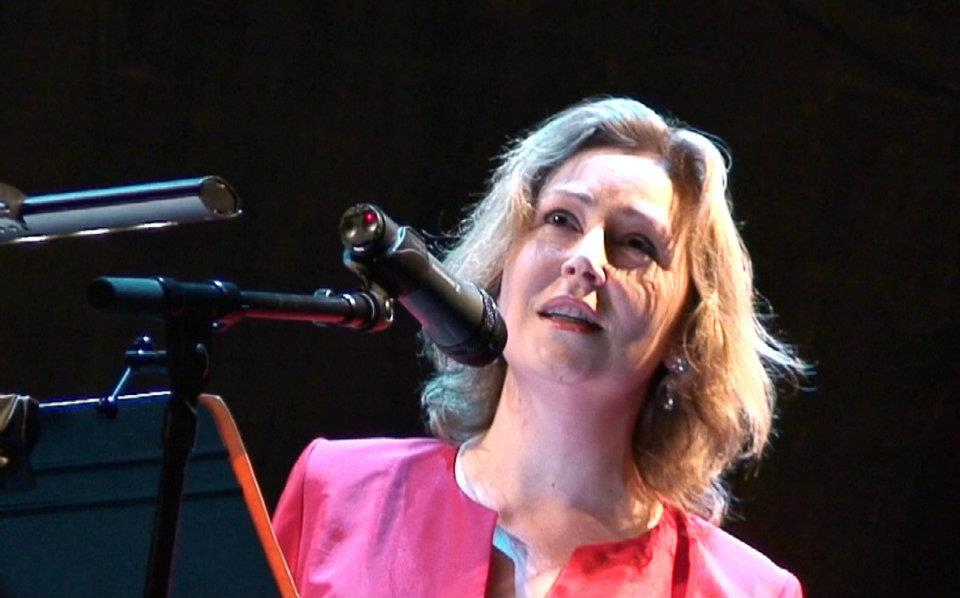
Deshayes in 2011

Karine Deshayes (French: [ka.ʁin de.ɛ]; born 25 January 1973) is a French mezzo-soprano. She is noted for her interpretations of bel canto roles (principally Rossini and Bellini).

== Biography ==
Deshayes was born in Rueil-Malmaison. She studied musicology at the Sorbonne, then singing with Mireille Alcantara at the Conservatoire de Paris, in which she later also specialized in baroque music under Emmanuelle Haïm. She also attended masterclasses of her mentor Régine Crespin. In 1998 she joined the troupe of Opéra National de Lyon. In 2001, she won several prizes in the "Voix d'Or" competition, and first prize in the "Voix Nouvelles" competition in 2002.

In October 2006 she made her New York Metropolitan Opera debut with Siébel in Gounod's Faust.

In February 2011, she debuted in the role of Urbain in Les Huguenots at the Teatro Real in Madrid.

In 2014 she made her San Francisco Opera debut in La Cenerentola.

== Awards and honours ==
- Singer of the Year (Artiste lyrique de l'année) in the Victoires de la musique classique (2011, 2016, 2020)
- 2019: Officier of the Ordre des Arts et des Lettres

== Selected discography ==
=== Recital ===
- Fauré: Le jardin clos, La chanson d'Ève, Mélodies. with Hélène Lucas, Stéphane Degout. Zig-Zag Territoires, 2009
- Après un rêve. with Ensemble Contraste. Aparté, 2015
- Rossini. with Les Forces Majeures, Raphael Merlin. Aparté, 2016

=== Full work recording ===
- Rameau: Le Berger Fidèle, Thétis & Pièces en concerts. with Alain Buet, Benjamin Lazar, Les Musiciens de Monsieur Croche. Alpha, 2004
- Porpora: Leçons de ténèbres. with Les Paladins, Jérôme Correas. Arion, 2005
- Magnificat (Bach), Dixit Dominus (Handel). with Natalie Dessay, Philippe Jaroussky, Toby Spence, Laurent Naouri. Emmanuelle Haïm, Le Concert d'Astrée. Erato, 2007
- Karol Beffa: Into the Dark. with Ensemble Contraste, Johan Farjot, Arnaud Thorette, Karol Beffa, Emmanuel Ceysson. Aparté, 2015
- Stabat Mater (Pergolesi). with Sonya Yoncheva, Ensemble Amarillis. Sony, 2016

=== Collaboration ===
- Fauré: La bonne chanson Op.61 & Piano Quartet Op.15, with Ensemble Contraste, Geneviève Laurenceau. Zig-Zag Territoires, 2010
- Cantates romantiques françaises. with Opera Fuoco, David Stern. Palazzetto Bru Zane, 2013
- Henri Marteau: Complete Works for String Quartet I. with Isasi Quartet. cpo, 2018
