= Patricia Petibon =

French soprano (born 1970)

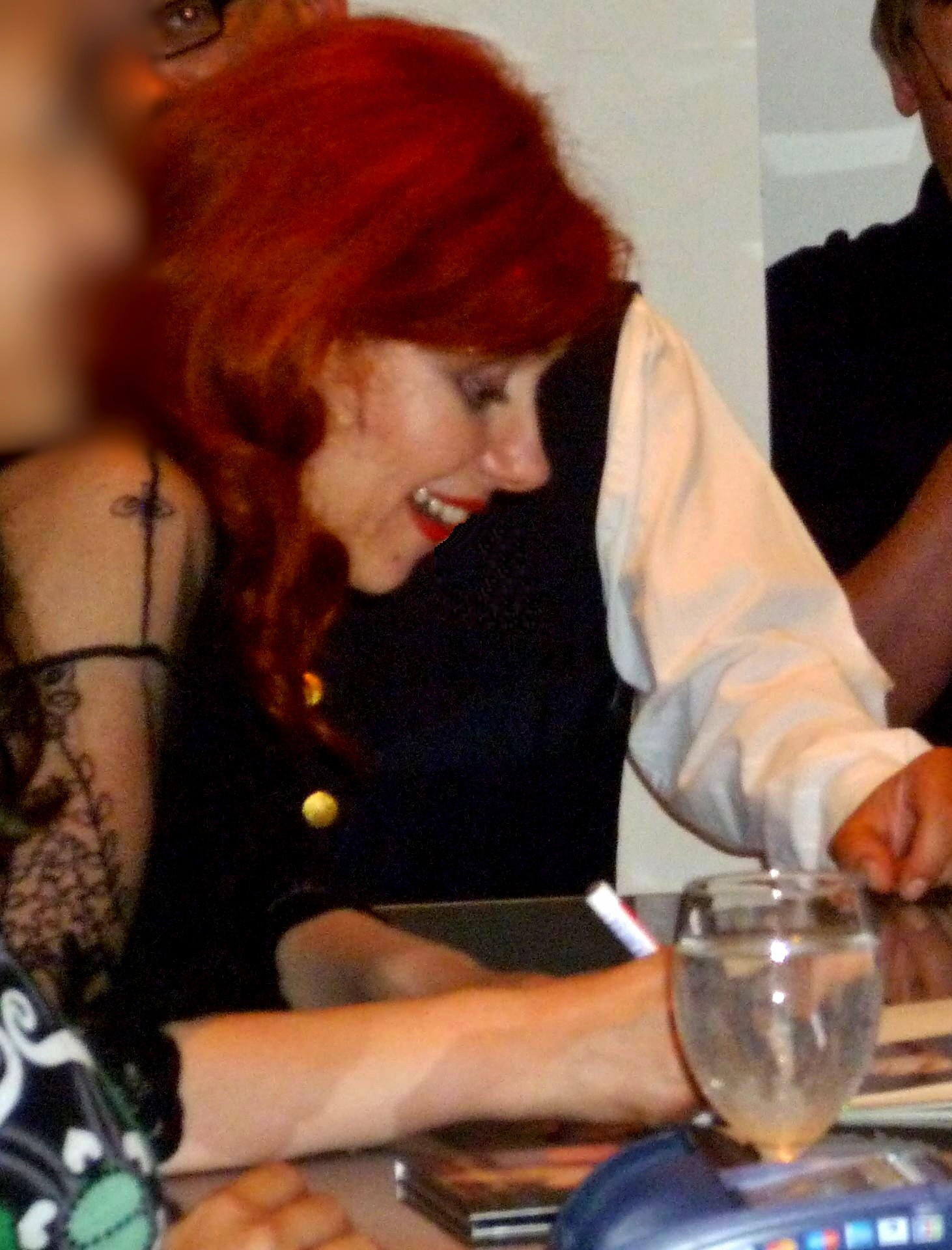
- Patricia Petibon signing autographs at the 2009 Salzburg Festival
- Born: Patricia Josette Petibon; 27 February 1970 (age 56); Montargis, Loiret, France
- Occupation: Opera singer (soprano)
- Years active: 1996–present
- Spouse: Didier Lockwood (m. 2015; died 2018)
- Partner: Éric Tanguy (before marriage)

Patricia Josette Petibon (French pronunciation: [patʁisja pətibɔ̃]; born 27 February 1970) is a French soprano.

== Life ==
Petibon was born in Montargis, the daughter of two teachers. She initially studied the visual arts, including painting, and subsequently changed her academic focus, earning a bachelor's degree in musicology. She later studied music at the Paris Conservatoire, where her teachers included Rachel Yakar, and from which she graduated with a first prize in 1995.

Petibon made her professional stage debut in Paris in 1996 in Rameau's Hippolyte et Aricie. She became a member of Les Arts Florissants and worked regularly with William Christie. Under the auspices of Victoires de la musique classique, she was named Best Young Talent in 1998 and Best Opera Singer in 2001 and 2003. She has made commercial recordings for such labels as Deutsche Grammophon and Erato.

In August 2010 she appeared at the Salzburg Festival in Vera Nemirova's production of Lulu with Marc Albrecht conducing the Vienna Philharmonic.

In March 2012 Petibon debuted as Donna Anna in Don Giovanni at the Paris Opera. In summer, she performed Susanna in The Marriage of Figaro at the Aix-en-Provence Festival.

In July 2015 she performed the title role of Alcina at the Aix-en-Provence Festival.

Petibon has a son, Léonard, from her previous relationship with French composer Éric Tanguy. She is the widow of the French jazz violinist Didier Lockwood.

== Recordings ==
Petibon signed to Sony Classical Records in 2017.

=== Solo recitals ===
- Amour et mascarade (Purcell et l'Italie) (1999). Jean-François Novelli, Ensemble Amarillis (Ambroisie)
- Airs baroques Français – Rameau/Lully/Charpentier/Grandval (2002). Patrick Cohën-Akenine, Les Folies Françoises (Virgin)
- Les Fantaisies de Patricia Petibon (2004, compilation) (Virgin)
- French Touch (2003). Yves Abel, Orchestre de l'Opéra National de Lyon (Decca)
- Amoureuses – Mozart/Haydn/Gluck (2008). Daniel Harding, Concerto Köln (Deutsche Grammophon)
- Rosso: Italian Baroque Arias – Santorio/Stradella/Handel/A. Scarlatti/Porpora/Vivaldi/Marcello (2010). Andrea Marcon, Venice Baroque Orchestra (Deutsche Grammophon)
- Melancolía: Spanish Arias and Songs (2011). Josep Pons, Orquesta Nacional de España (Deutsche Grammophon)
- Nouveau Monde: Baroque Arias and Songs (2012). Andrea Marcon, La Cetra Barockorchester Basel (Deutsche Grammophon)
- La belle excentrique (2014). joint album with Susan Manoff (Deutsche Grammophon)
- L'Amour, la Mort, la Mer (2020) with Susan Manoff. (Sony Classical)

=== Complete works ===
- Niccolò Jommelli: Armida abbandonata (1994; as Ubaldo, a knight). Christophe Rousset, Les Talens Lyriques (Ambroisie)
- Marc-Antoine Charpentier: La descente d'Orphée aux enfers (1995; as Daphné/Énone). William Christie, Les Arts Florissants (Erato)
- Étienne Méhul: Stratonice (1996; as Stratonice). William Christie, Cappella Coloniensis, Corona Coloniensis (Erato)
- Stefano Landi: Il Sant'Alessio (1996; as Alessio). William Christie, Les Arts Florissants (Erato)
- Jean-Philippe Rameau: Hippolyte et Aricie (1997; as Priestess/Shepherdess). William Christie, Les Arts Florissants (Erato)
- Leçons de ténèbres (Couperin) (1997). William Christie, Les Arts Florissants (Erato)
- Léo Delibes: Lakmé (1998; as Ellen). Michel Plasson, Choir & Orchestra of the Théâtre du Capitole (EMI Classics)
- Jacques Offenbach: Orphée aux enfers (1998; as Cupidon). Marc Minkowski, Chœur et Orchestre de l'Opéra National de Lyon (EMI Classics)
- Antonio Caldara: La Passione di Gesù Cristo Signor Nostro (1999; as Maddalena). Fabio Biondi, Europa Galante (Virgin)
- Wolfgang Amadeus Mozart: Die Entführung aus dem Serail (1999; as Blonde). William Christie, Les Arts Florissants (Erato)
- Acis and Galatea (Handel) (1999; as Damon). William Christie, Les Arts Florissants (Erato)
- Jules Massenet: Werther (1999; as Sophie). Antonio Pappano, London Symphony Orchestra, Tiffin Children's Choir (EMI Classics)
- Wolfgang Amadeus Mozart: Great Mass in C minor, K. 427 (1999). William Christie, Les Arts Florissants (Erato)
- Joseph Haydn: Armida (2000; as Zelmira). Nikolaus Harnoncourt, Concentus Musicus Wien (Teldec)
- Marc-Antoine Charpentier: Les plaisirs de Versailles / Pastoraletta H.492 (2005; as Choeur/Filli). William Christie, Les Arts Florissants (Erato)
- Joseph Haydn: Orlando paladino (2006; as Angelica). Nikolaus Harnoncourt, Concentus Musicus Wien (Deutsche Harmonia Mundi)
- Carl Orff: Carmina Burana (2010). Daniel Harding, Bavarian Radio Symphony Orchestra & Choir (Deutsche Grammophon)
- Francis Poulenc: Stabat Mater; Gloria; Litanies à la Vierge noire (2013). Paavo Järvi, Orchestre de Paris (Deutsche Grammophon)

=== Collaborations ===
- 1999: American Boychoir – Fast Cats and Mysterious Cows ~ Songs from America; James Litton, Malcolm Bruno, Catherine King (mezzo-soprano) (Virgin)
- 1999: Marc-Antoine Charpentier – Divertissements, Airs et Concerts; William Christie, Les Arts Florissants (Erato)
- 2001: Futuristiq – Demain c'est maintenant [featured in "Cyril et Roland"]
- 2001: Cuvée 2000 (Ambroisie)
- 2002: George Frideric Handel – Arcadian Duets; Emmanuelle Haïm, Le Concert d'Astrée (Virgin)
- 2004: Florent Pagny – Baryton [in duet "Guide me home", originally by Freddie Mercury/Montserrat Caballé] (Mercury Records)

=== DVDs ===
- 2000: Christoph Willibald Gluck: Orphée et Eurydice (as Amor); John Eliot Gardiner, Orchestre Révolutionnaire et Romantique, Monteverdi Choir (EMI Classics)
- 2000: Francis Poulenc: Dialogues des Carmélites (as Constance) Jan Latham-Koenig, Orchestre Philmarmonique de Strasbourg, Choers de L'Opéra national du Rhin (Arthaus Musik)
- 2003: Wolfgang Amadeus Mozart: Die Entführung aus dem Serail (as Blonde); Christoph König, Orchestra of Zürich Opera House (BelAir Classiques)
- 2004: Jean-Philippe Rameau: Les Indes galantes (as Zima); William Christie, Les Arts Florissants, Opéra de Paris (Opus Arte)
- 2005: French Touch (Recital at Salle Gaveau)
- 2010: Alban Berg: Lulu (as Lulu); Michael Boder, Symphony Orchestra of Gran Teatre del Liceu (Deutsche Grammophon)
- 2012: Alban Berg: Lulu (as Lulu); Marc Albrecht, Vienna Philharmonic (Kultur/Unitel)
- 2014: Francis Poulenc: Dialogues des Carmélites (as Blanche); Jérémie Rhorer, Philharmonia Orchestra, Chorus of Théâtre des Champs-Élysées (Erato)
- 2015: George Frideric Handel: Alcina (as Alcina); Andrea Marcon, Freiburger Barockorchester, MusicAeterna (Erato)

== Honours ==
- Knight of the Legion of Honour (2021)
