= Ormindo =

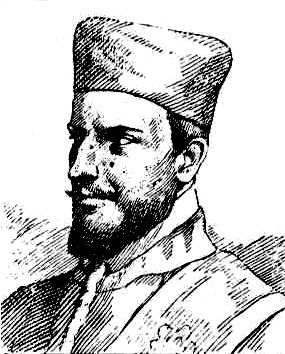
Francesco Cavalli

L'Ormindo is an opera in a prologue and three acts by Francesco Cavalli to an original Italian libretto by Giovanni Faustini. The manuscript score is held at the Biblioteca Marciana in Venice, while a copy of the original libretto has been digitized by the Library of Congress. The opera has set numbers with recitative, and is set in Anfa (Casablanca), in the Mauri kingdom of Fessa (Fez).

== Performance history ==
Ormindo was first performed in 1644 at the Teatro San Cassiano, Venice, the world's first public opera house. After its 1644 run, it was probably not revived until 1967 when it was performed at Glyndebourne Festival Opera. The version presented at Glyndebourne was arranged and conducted by Raymond Leppard. The work received its American premiere in 1968 in a performance at the Juilliard School supervised by Leppard. Subsequently it was performed by the Washington Opera Society, using Juilliard's sets and Costumes. Singers were as follows: Amida -John Reardon; Erice - Michael Best; Ormindo - Frank Poretta; Sicle -Evelyn Mandac; Erisbe- Benita Valente.

The United States premiere of the opera was given by the Juilliard Opera Theatre at Lincoln Center in New York City on April 25, 1968 with a cast that included Grayson Hirst in the title role, Robert Shiesley as Amida, Alan Ord as Hariadeno, Barbara Shuttleworth as Erisbe, Joanna Bruno as Nerillo, Wilma Shakesnider as Sicle, Michael Best as Erice, Anita Terzian Titus as Mirinda, and Alan Titus as Osmano.

Although taken up by the State Opera of South Australia and staged in 1980, the opera remains something of a rarity. A recent performance was by the Pittsburgh Opera in February, 2007, using a new performing edition by Peter Foster. It was conducted by Bernard McDonald and directed by Chas Rader-Shieber. Peter Foster's edition was also used by The Harvard Early Music Society in its November, 2008 performance of the work, conducted by Matthew Hall and directed by Roy Kimmey. The Baylor University School of Music performed the work in English on November 21–22, 2008 under the direction of Dr. Michael Johnson with conductor Dr. Andrew Hudson. It was performed by Pinchgut Opera of Sydney in December 2009. The Royal Opera staged a new production, in an English translation, directed by Kasper Holten at Shakespeare's Globe in March 2014 - the first opera production at the newly opened Sam Wanamaker Playhouse. This production was revived the following year (in February 2015) at the same venue. The Royal Irish Academy of Music based in Dublin presented the first Irish production of the opera in January 2015 directed by Ben Barnes and conducted by David Adams.

== Roles ==
Role	Voice type	Premiere Cast, 1644 (Conductor: - )
L'Armonia (Harmony) performs the prologue	soprano	
Ormindo, Hariadeno's unknown son	contralto castrato	
Amida, Prince of Tremisene (Tlemcen)	contralto castrato	
Nerillo, his page	soprano	
Sicle, Princess of Susio (Sous)	soprano	
Melide, her lady-in-waiting	soprano	
Erice, her nurse	tenor (travesti)	
Erisbe, Hariadeno's wife	soprano	
Mirinda, her lady-in-waiting and confidante	soprano	
Hariadeno, King of Morocco and Fessa (Fez)	bass	
Il Destino (Destiny)	tenor	
Amore (Cupid)	soprano	
La Fortuna (Fortune)	soprano	
The Winds	tenor and bass	
Osman, Hariadeno's captain	tenor	
Guardian of the arsenal of Anfa	tenor	
Messenger	soprano	
Ormindo's soldiers, Amida's soldiers, Mauritanian soldiers, Erisbe's ladies-in-waiting

== Synopsis ==
Setting: Anfa, a city of the Kingdom of Fessa in Mauretania.

The Maghreb princes, Amida and Ormindo, who are assisting in the defense of Mauretania, are both in love with Erisbe who is unhappily married to Hariadeno, Fessa's elderly king. The princes agree to remain friends while they test her love. During the course of the opera, there is much plotting by Amore, Princess Sicle (Amida's abandoned lover) and Erice (Sicle's nurse) to interfere with the contest. Erice stages a séance to communicate with the 'dead' Sicle who reproaches Amida for his inconstancy which had driven her to suicide. Amida, overcome with remorse, realizes that he still loves Princess Sicle and is overjoyed when it is revealed that she is actually alive and not a ghost. Meanwhile, Erisbe and Ormindo decide to elope to Tunis, where Ormindo must defend his homeland from attack. When King Hariadeno discovers their adultery, he orders his captain, Osmano, to have them poisoned. However, Osmano substitutes a sleeping potion for the poison at the urging of Mirinda (Erisbe's confidante) who has promised to marry him if he spares the lovers. All ends more or less happily when the King learns that Ormindo is actually his son from a youthful liaison. He forgives everyone and cedes his kingdom to Ormindo.

== Recordings ==
Complete

- Cavalli: L'Ormindo (John Wakefield, Peter-Christoph Runge, Isabel Garcisanz, Hanneke van Bork, Jean Allister, Hugues Cuénod, Anne Howells, Jane Berbié, Federico Davià, Richard Van Allan; London Philharmonic Orchestra; Raymond Leppard, conductor). Recorded at the Glyndebourne Festival Opera. Label: (1967) Argo (ZNF 8–10)
- Cavalli: L'Ormindo (Sandrine Piau, Martin Oro, Howard Crook, Dominique Visse, Magali Léger, Jean-François Lombard, Stéphanie Révidat, Karine Deshayes, Jacques Bona, Benoît Arnould; Les Paladins, ensemble; Jérôme Correas, harpsichord and conductor). Label: (studio, June 2006) Pan Classics

Excerpts

- Cavalli: Arias and Duets from Didone, Egisto, Ormindo, Giasone and Callisto (Mario Cecchetti, tenor; Rosita Frisani, soprano; Gloria Banditelli, mezzo-soprano; Mediterraneo Concento, ensemble; Sergio Vartolo, conductor). Label: Naxos
- L'Ormindo: L'Armonia (Prologo) Hana Blažiková (soprano); L'Arpeggiata, Christina Pluhar conductor
