= Bertrand Chamayou =

French pianist

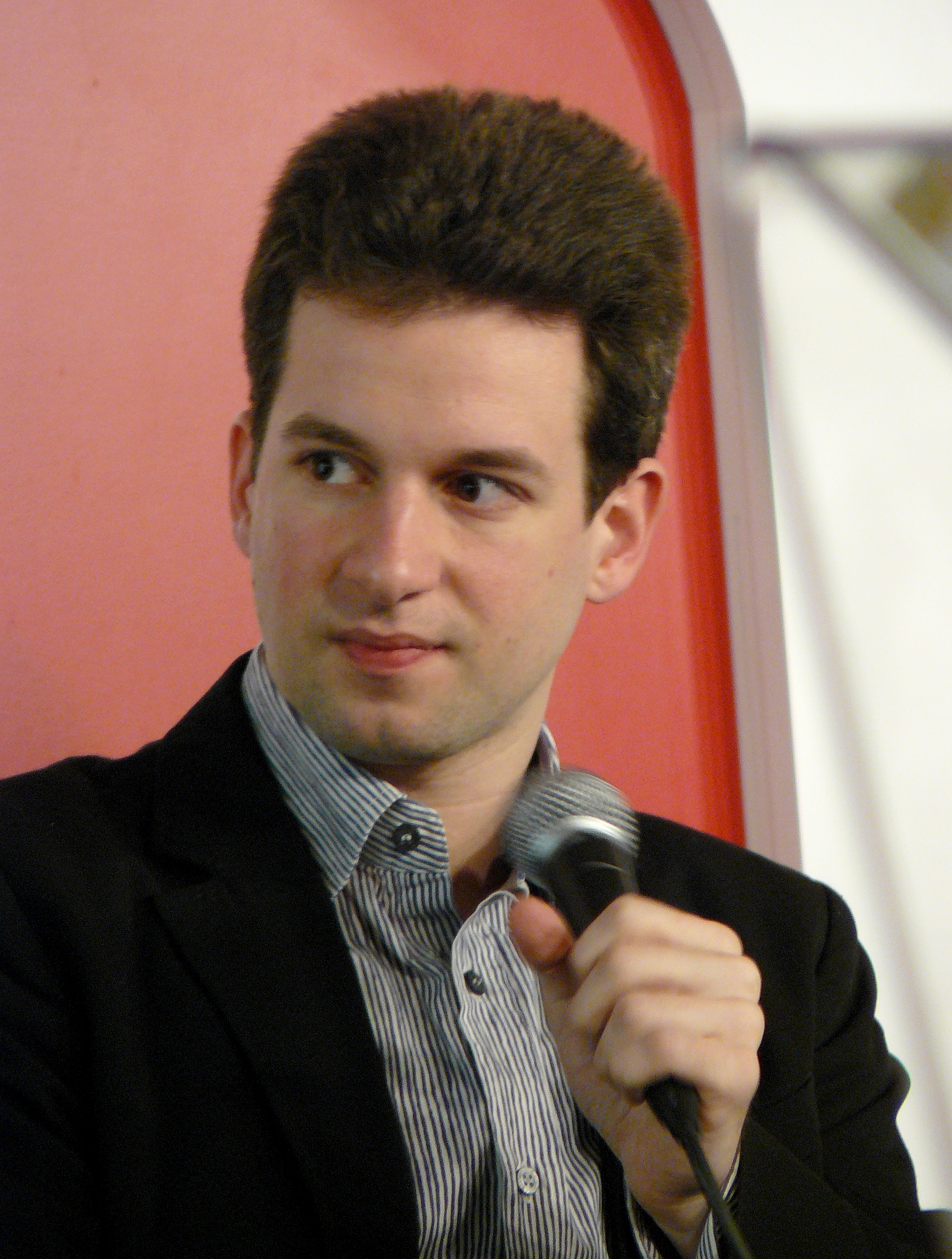
Bertrand Chamayou in 2010

Bertrand Chamayou (born 23 March 1981) is a French pianist.

== Career ==
Born in Toulouse, Chamayou studied at the Conservatoire de Toulouse under the tutelage of Claudine Willoth, making his first forays into contemporary music and composition. At the age of 15, with the encouragement of pianist-conductor Jean-François Heisser, Chamayou continued his studies at the Conservatoire de Paris.

At the same time, he began to work with Maria Curcio in London, receiving advice from such mentors as Leon Fleisher, Dmitri Bashkirov and above all Murray Perahia, who "has left a profound mark" on him. In 1998, he became laureat of the Kraïnev Piano Competition in Ukraine and was awarded 4th prize the International Long-Thibaud-Crespin Competition at the age of 20.

Chamayou has since performed in venues such as the Théâtre des Champs-Élysées, Lincoln Center, the Herkulessaal Munich and London's Wigmore Hall. He has appeared at major festivals including New York's Mostly Mozart Festival, the Lucerne Festival, Edinburgh International Festival, Rheingau Musik Festival, Beethovenfest Bonn and Klavier-Festival Ruhr.

In the 2015/16 season, Bertrand Chamayou made his debuts with the Gewandhaus Orchester Leipzig, Konzerthaus Orchester Berlin, Cincinnati Symphony Orchestra, Wiener Symphoniker and Orquestra Sinfônica do Estado de São Paulo. He is the only artist to have received the French Victoire de la Musique Classique award three times, most recently in the category of Instrumental Soloist in 2016 (previously "Revelation of the Year, Solo Instrumentalist" in 2006, and "Recording of the Year" in 2012).

In 2016, he released a double-album on Erato of the complete works for solo piano of Maurice Ravel, recorded in his hometown of Toulouse and hailed in Gramophone magazine for "revelatory performances of breathtaking beauty".

Chamayou is a regular chamber music performer, with partners including Renaud and Gautier Capuçon, Quatuor Ebène, Antoine Tamestit, Vilde Frang and Sol Gabetta, among others.

He became a Chevalier of the Ordre des Arts et des Lettres in 2015.

In 2019, his album featuring Saint-Saëns's Piano Concertos Nos. 2 and 5 with the French National Orchestra and Emanuel Krivine won the Gramophone Recording of the Year.

== Discography ==
- Schubert: Four Hands, with Leif Ove Andsnes, Warner Classics/Erato (2025)
- Cage², Warner Classics/Erato (2024)
- Letter(s) To Erik Satie: Piano Works by Composers Erik Satie, John Cage & James Tenney, Warner Classics/Erato (2023)
- Maurice Ravel: Complete Works for Solo Piano, Erato (2016)
- Frédéric Chopin: The Chopin Album, Sol Gabetta (cello), Sony Classical (2015)
- Franz Schubert: Works for Solo Piano, Erato (2014)
- Franz Liszt: Klavierkonzert Nr. 1. Bertrand Chamayou, Julien Chauvin (violin), Le Cercle de L'Harmonie, Jérémie Rhorer
- Franz Liszt: Années de Pèlerinage
- Felix Mendelssohn: Piano Works, Naïve
- César Franck: Prelude, Choral & Fugue, Bertrand Chamayou, Olivier Latry, Royal Scottish National Orchestra, Stéphane Denève, Naïve
- Henri Reber: Symphonie Nr.4 op.33, Berlioz: Reverie & Caprice for violin and orchestra op.8

== Honours ==
- Chevalier of the Order of Arts and Letters (2015)
