= Jean-François Heisser =

French pianist

Jean-François Heisser (born 7 December 1950) is a French classical pianist.

== Biography ==
Born in Saint-Étienne, Heisser studied piano first with Paul Simonnar in Saint-Étienne, then at the Conservatoire de Paris with Vlado Perlemuter.

His vast repertoire ranges from romantic music (Brahms, Chopin, Schumann, Schubert, Mendelssohn) to contemporary music (Boulez, Stockhausen, Gilbert Amy, Berio).

From 1984, Heisser teaches at the Conservatoire de Paris. He also presides the Académie Maurice Ravel of Saint-Jean-de-Luz and is music director of the Soirées musicales of Arles.

In 2000, after a great success during the La Folle Journée of Nantes and Festival de La Roque-d'Anthéron concerts, he took over the artistic direction of the Orchestre de Chambre Nouvelle-Aquitaine.

He performs regularly with the Pražák, Lindsay and Ysaÿe Quartets. With Marie-Josèphe Jude, he plays the repertoire with four hands or two pianos, interprets Bartók's two sonatas with violinist Péter Csaba. Other chamber music partners include Sandor Vegh, Augustin Dumay, Gérard Poulet, Georges Pludermacher, Pierre Amoyal, Régis Pasquier, Gérard Caussé, Michel Portal. He also participates to the Montreux, Kuhmo, Bratislava, and Turin festivals.

He gave the complete Beethoven's concertos under the direction of Louis Langrée. In 2001, he played Brahms' first concerto at a farewell concert by Yevgeny Svetlanov. In 2002, he gave the world premiere of the solo piano work by Philippe Manoury La Ville in the framework of the Piano aux Jacobins festival.

Heisser also enjoys conducting the orchestra from his piano, as he did with the Orchestre national de France in a concerto by Mozart.

He has also played with the Moscow and Bucharest Philharmonies, the Orchestre de la Suisse Romande, the Dutch Chamber Orchestra, the RAI orchestras of Turin, Radio Sofia and Helsinki, the new Orchestre philharmonique de Radio France, the Bavarian Radio Symphony Orchestra, the Orchestre du Mai florentin, conducted, among others, by Zubin Mehta, Emmanuel Krivine, Marek Janowski, Myung-Whun Chung, Leif Segerstam, Michael Tilson Thomas, etc.

Among his pupils are Bertrand Chamayou, Vanessa Wagner, Lucas Debargue.

== Prizes ==
1973: 1st Prize in piano, counterpoint, harmony, fugue, accompaniment and chamber music

- Vianna da Motta (Lisbon) and Jaén, Spain (first prize) International competitions

== Recordings ==
- Soundtrack of Louis Malle's feature film Au revoir les enfants (Carrere, 1987, barcode 3218030964835)
- Paul Dukas's complete work for piano (Diapason d'or), Harmonic Records, 1988.
- Brahms' Hungarian Dances, with Marie-Josèphe Jude (Naïve Records, 2001)
- Bartók's Sonatas for violin and piano No 1 and No 2, Péter Csaba, violin (Praga Digitals, 2001)
- Schumann's Sonatas for violin and piano No 1 and No 2, 3 romances for violin and piano, Gérard Poulet, violin (Erato, 1992, 2292–45749–2)
- Camille Saint-Saëns, piano concerto n°4, Jean-François Heisser, piano, Les Siècles, conducted by Françoi-Xavier Roth. CD Actes Sud 2010

For several years, he has specialized in the Spanish repertoire and has recorded works for piano by de Falla, Albéniz, Granados, Mompou and Turina (Erato, 1996). He also recorded pieces by Schumann, Bartók, Debussy, and Beethoven (Naïve, 2000).
