= Cantilena Antiqua =

Cantilena Antiqua is an Italian early music group founded in 1987 and based in Bologna. The ensemble of 3 to 13 musicians is directed by musician and sound engineer Stefano Albarello. The ensemble's repertoire is primarily of medieval, renaissance and Andalusian music.

== Discography ==
- Canticum canticorum, Symphonia (record label) SY 95135. Settings of the Song of Songs 12th-13th century.
- Claustrum beatitudinis, SY 95141. Latin Lauda (song) from the Bobbio Abbey, 13th-14th century.
- O spem miram, ("O wonderful hope") SY 96145. Office and mass for Saint Dominic according to the song of the Dominican Order, 13th century.
- Aines, ("Agnes"). Medieval mystery play of Saint Agnes of Rome from Provence, 14th century. (Live recording) SY 99165
- Ballate e madrigali, al tempo della Signoria di Paolo Guinigi Tactus Records 400002. - A collection of ballatas and early madrigal (music)s, during the lordship of Paolo Guinigi in Lucca 15th century.
- Ondas do mar. ("Waves of the sea") Symphonia (record label), 1998; SY 96157. Andalusian classical music and Cantigas de amigo of Martin Codax. reissued as "Insiraf" (literally "departure"). Pan Classics, Switzerland. 2011.
- Epos - Music of the Carolingian Era
- Joys Amors Chants. Passacaille Records
