= Caroline Dumas =

French opera singer

Caroline Dumas (born 15 January 1935) is a French soprano considered as "probably the most emblematic student of the lyrical singer Charles Panzéra".

== Life ==
Born in Casablanca, after obtaining three first prizes at the Conservatoire de Paris, she was hired by the Paris Opera where she distinguished herself as a soloist for fifteen years, under the baton of Georges Prêtre and other prestigious conductors. At the Palais Garnier where she began, among the roles for which she was known, first under the name of Micheline Dumas and then Caroline Dumas, were those of Frasquita (in 1962, 1964, 1966) in Bizet's Carmen, Marceline in Beethoven's Fidelio (in 1968), Micaëla in Carmen (1969, 1970) and Marguerite (in Gounod's Faust).

She has also performed for more than thirty years in many opera houses around the world. A singing teacher at the École Normale de Musique de Paris, she is regularly invited to master classes in Egypt, Morocco, China, Russia and Georgia. Her discography includes several recordings with Gabriel Bacquier (in particular the famous "duo de l'escarpolette" in Messager's Véronique).

On December 8, 2013, she performed, with bass-baritone Mourad Amirkhanian and cellist Dominique de Williencourt, salle Gaveau in Paris, at a recital entitled "Merci la France ! It is Armenia that remembers - 25 years later.... The earthquake in Armenia".

In 2017, she was one of the founding members of the InterHallier Center.

== Discography ==
- Horizons lyriques - Live with Léo Schneydermann, piano. Works by Francesco Paolo Tosti, Jules Massenet, Giacomo Puccini, Francis Poulenc, Umberto Giordano, Henri Duparc, Edvard Grieg, Gabriel Fauré, Georges Bizet, Giuseppe Verdi, Franz Lehar - Maguelone, 2000
