= Ritmo cassinese =

Medieval Italian Poem

Ai Deu, que pentia null'omo fare
[en] questa bita regnare,
deducere, deportare?
Mort'è, non guita gustare.
cumqua de questa sia pare?
Ma tantu quistu mundu è gaudebele
ke l'unu e·ll'altru face mescredebele!

Ah God, no one thinks to lead a regulated life, [but] to amuse and enjoy oneself. . . It is death, not life, to enjoy whatever may be similar to this [life]. But this world is so pleasurable that it causes people to not believe the one and the other.
(vv. 20–26, translation from Kleinhenz)

The Ritmo cassinese is a medieval Italian verse allegory of unresolved interpretation, told as a meeting between an Occidental and Oriental in ninety-six verses in twelve strophes of varying length. Though it is one of the earliest surviving pieces of literature in an Italian vernacular, along with the Ritmo laurenziano and the Ritmo di Sant'Alessio, its "artistry and literary awareness [preclude] any possibility that [it] represent[s] the actual beginnings of vernacular composition in Italy", according to Peter Dronke (quoted in Rico, 681).

The Ritmo is preserved in manuscript 552–32 of the Abbey of Montecassino (whence its name). The manuscript is from the eleventh-century, but the poem was only copied into it in the late twelfth or early thirteenth, judging from the handwriting. The poet's dialect is "central–southern Italian". Each strophe is composed of monorhyming ottonari and a concluding monorhymed couplet or tercet of endecasillabi, though there are metrical and linguistic irregularities. The poet is indebted to an unnamed Latin source, scriptura, possibly the Bible. It has been speculated, based on internal references to fegura (figure, allegory, picture, drawing), that the poem may have been performed by a giullare with visual aids.

The opening stanza introduces the contrast between this life and the afterlife. The poet goes on to sermonise on the attraction of this life in the third stanza. In the fourth the allegory is introduced between the mosse d'Oriente ("good sir from the Orient") and he d'Occidente. The remainder of the poem is a conversation between the two, with the Occidental inquiring about life in the east, especially about the Oriental's diet. When he finds that the Oriental does not eat nor feels hunger, but is satisfied by merely looking upon a particularly fruitful vine, he remarks that he "can have no pleasure" (non sactio com'unqua). The Oriental responds by pointing out that if he neither hungers nor thirsts, there is no need to eat or drink. Finally, the Occidental realises that the Oriental needs nothing and receives from God everything he asks and em quella forma bui gaudete ("in that condition you rejoice").

On the surface the poem is contrast between life on Earth and life in Heaven, but has been interpreted as a contrast between secular and monastic life on Earth, between western (Benedictine) and eastern (Basilian) monasticism, and between less strict Benedictinism and a strict following of its rule. Montecassino, where the poem is preserved, was the foremost monastery in the West and the original Benedictine foundation. On the other hand, the poem may belong to the medieval tradition of debate poems, such as those between Body and Soul and those between the active life (vita attiva or pratica) and the contemplative life (vita contemplativa). A third interpretive scheme places the poem in the didactic tradition. The Oriental is a mystic instructing the Occidental, a neophyte. The poem was designed for young monks and initiates, as a learning device. All interpretations agree that it is the view of the Oriental that is being imparted to the audience, and that spirituality (as opposed to worldliness) and asceticism are promoted.

== Editions ==
- Poeti del Duecento, vol. 1. Gianfranco Contini, ed. Milan and Naples: Ricciardi, 1960, pp. 7–13. Available
- Early Italian Texts. Carlo Dionisotti and Cecil Grayson, edd. 2nd ed. Oxford: Blackwell, 1965 [1949], pp. 76–90.
