= Sabine Devieilhe =

French operatic coloratura soprano (born 1985)

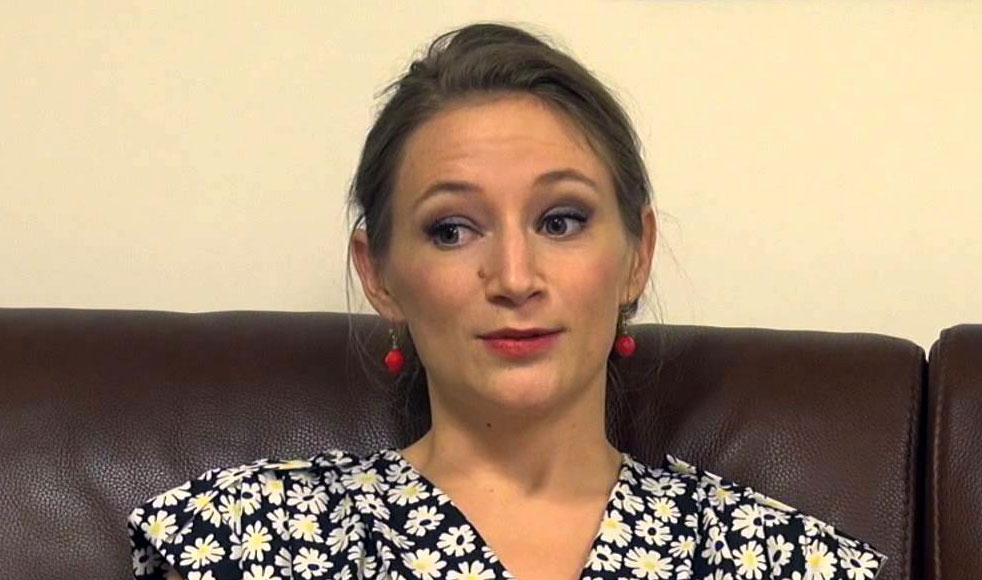
- Devieilhe in an interview in 2015
- Born: 12 December 1985 (age 40); Ifs, Calvados, France
- Education: Conservatoire de Paris
- Occupation: Opera singer (soprano)
- Years active: Since 2011
- Spouse: Raphaël Pichon
- Awards: 2006: 1st Prize Tremplin Jeunes Talents d'Auray; 2009: Lauréate du Concours des S'sentiels de Nantes; 2011: Révélation Classique de l'ADAMI
- Website: www.sabinedevieilhe.com

Sabine Devieilhe (French: [sa.bin də.vjɛl]; born 12 December 1985) is a French operatic coloratura soprano. She is known for her interpretation of works by Mozart, Baroque music, and 19th-century opera. She is often regarded as a successor to Natalie Dessay.

== Early life and training ==
Devieilhe was born in Ifs, near Caen, France, on 12 December 1985 into a non-musician family – her parents work in special education, although her older sister teaches singing and violin.

She began her musical apprenticeship at the Ifs school of music before entering the Caen Conservatory at the age of twelve in order to study the cello. Influenced successively by conductor Valérie Fayet, and singing teachers Jocelyne Chamonin (Caen Conservatory), Martine Surais (Rennes Conservatory), Pierre Mervant, Malcolm Walker and Elène Golgevit (Conservatoire de Paris), she became a lyrical singer.

After graduating from the Lycée Malherbe, Sabine Devieilhe obtained a diploma in musicology and ethnomusicology at the University of Rennes 2. In parallel with her studies, she joined the choir of the Opéra de Rennes. She participated as a chorister in a production of The Flying Dutchman by Richard Wagner in 2002. Her voice was praised and she became a soloist. In 2008, she entered the Conservatoire de Paris in the singing class of Pierre Mervant. In 2011 she was unanimously awarded first prize, with the jury's congratulations.

== Career ==
Recognised by Jean-Claude Malgoire, Devieilhe debuted as a soloist with the Atelier Lyrique de Tourcoing in October 2011, singing Amina in Bellini's La sonnambula.

In 2012, she was invited to portray Serpetta in Aix-en-Provence Festival's production of La finta giardiniera; she repeated her role in later performances at the Grand Théâtre de Luxembourg and the Toulon Opera. In October 2012, she made her role debut playing the title role in Lakmé at the Opéra national de Montpellier to critical success. In June–July 2013, she debuted in the role of the Queen of the Night in Mozart's The Magic Flute at the Opéra National de Lyon. Later in the year, she interpreted Sister Constance in Christophe Honoré's staging of Poulenc's Dialogues des Carmélites at the Opéra de Lyon, Théâtre Graslin in Nantes, Le Quai in Angers. and Olivier Py's production of the same opera at the Théâtre des Champs-Élysées, alternating the role with Sandrine Piau.

In 2014, she sang in Lakmé by Léo Delibes at the Opéra-Comique. She made her debut with the Paris Opera portraying the Queen of the Night at the Opéra Bastille in performances in March.

On 11 April 2016, together with the Orchestre de chambre de Paris conducted by Christopher Franklin and the choir Les Cris de Paris, she performed in a concert version of La sonnambula at the Théâtre des Champs-Élysées. In September 2017, she made her debut at the Royal Opera, London in the role of the Queen of the Night.

In January 2019, Devieilhe made her Carnegie Hall debut at Weill Recital Hall, singing a program of French songs by Debussy and his circle.

She is often praised by critics.

== Awards and honors ==
- On 25 February 2013, Sabine Devieilhe was named "Révélation Artiste Lyrique" at the Victoires de la musique classique.
- On 2 February 2015, she was voted "Singer of the Year" (Artiste lyrique de l'année) at the Victoires de la musique classique.
- Asteroid 33346 Sabinedevieilhe was named in her honor. The official naming citation was published by the Minor Planet Center on 31 January 2018 (M.P.C. 108697).

== Repertory ==
- Lucia, The Rape of Lucretia (Britten)
- Lauretta, Gianni Schicchi (Puccini)
- Amina, La sonnambula (Bellini)
- Céphise, Acante et Céphise (Rameau)
- La Folie, Platée (Rameau)
- Hébé/Phani/Zima, Les Indes galantes (Rameau)
- Venus, Dardanus (Rameau)
- Belinda, Dido and Æneas (Purcell)
- Blonde, Die Entführung aus dem Serail (Mozart)
- Ilia, Idomeneo (Mozart)
- Ismene, Mitridate, re di Ponto (Mozart)
- Serpetta, La finta giardiniera (Mozart)
- Susanna, Le Nozze di Figaro (Mozart)
- Queen of the Night, The Magic Flute (Mozart)
- Sister Constance, Dialogues des Carmélites (Poulenc)
- Blanche de la Force, Dialogues des Carmélites (Poulenc)
- Lakmé, Lakmé (Delibes)
- Eurydice, Orfeo ed Euridice (Gluck)
- Olympia, Les contes d'Hoffmann (Offenbach)
- Adele, Die Fledermaus (J. Strauss II)
- Mélisande, Pelléas et Mélisande (Debussy)
- Dinorah, Dinorah (Meyerbeer)
- Nannetta, Falstaff (Verdi)
- The Princess/The Fire/The Nightingale, L'enfant et les sortilèges (Ravel)
- Aminta, Aminta e Fillide (Handel)
- Bellezza, Il trionfo del tempo e del disinganno (Handel)
- Cleopatra, Giulio Cesare (Handel)
- Morgana, Alcina (Handel)
- Dalinda, Ariodante (Handel)
- Héro, Béatrice et Bénédict (Berlioz)
- Marie, La fille du régiment (Donizetti)
- Sophie, Der Rosenkavalier (R. Strauss)
- Zerbinetta, Ariadne auf Naxos (R. Strauss)
- Cunegonde, Candide (Bernstein)
- Ophélie, Hamlet (Thomas)
- Tsaritsa of Shemakha, The Golden Cockerel (Rimsky-Korsakov)

== Discography ==
In 2013, she signed an exclusive contract with the music label Erato and released her first recital album devoted to Jean-Philippe Rameau with Alexis Kossenko and his ensemble Les Ambassadeurs.

- Gustave Charpentier: Musiques du Prix de Rome. Sabine Devieilhe (soprano), Helena Bohuszewicz (contralto), Bernard Richter (tenor), Alain Buet (baritone). Brussels Philharmonic, Hervé Niquet. Recordings made at Le Flagey in Brussels from 14 to 18 June 2011, released under the label Glossa (GES 922211-F).
- Jean-Philippe Rameau: Le Grand théâtre de l'amour. Les Ambassadeurs, conductor Alexis Kossenko. Samuel Boden (tenor), Aimery Lefèvre (baritone), Le Jeune Chœur de Paris. Recorded from 6 to 13 May 2013 in Our Lady of Lebanon of Paris Cathedral. Released 28 October 2013 by Erato – Warner Classics (ERATO 5099993414920). Distinctions: Diapason d'or de l'année (November 2014), Diapason d'or (November 2013), Le Choix de France Musique (December 2013), 4 stars Classica (December 2013), Hi-Res Audio (November 2013) Album of the Week on BBC Radio 3.
- Johann Sebastian Bach: Köthener Trauermusik, BWV 244a. Sabine Devieilhe (soprano), Damien Guillon, Thomas Hobbs, Christian Immler. Ensemble Pygmalion (Raphaël Pichon). Released 7 September 2014 by Harmonia Mundi (HMC902211.13). Distinctions: Victoires de la musique classique 2015 recording category, 4ƒ of Télérama (September 2014)
- Jean-Philippe Rameau: Castor et Pollux. Ensemble Pygmalion (Raphaël Pichon). Released April 2015 by Harmonia Mundi (HMC902212.13). Distinctions : Grand Prix of the Académie Charles Cros 4ƒ of Télérama (May 2015).
- Wolfgang Amadeus Mozart: Mozart - The Weber Sisters. Ensemble Pygmalion (Raphaël Pichon). Recorded from 12 to 18 January 2015 in Our Lady of Lebanon of Paris Cathedral. Released 6 November 2015 by Erato – Warner Classics (ERATO 2564607584). Distinctions: 5 stars of Diapason (December 2015), 4ƒ of Télérama (December 2015), Choc de Classica (November 2015), Choc Classica of the year (November 2015).
- Mirages. Les Siècles, François-Xavier Roth. Released November 2017 by Erato – Warner Classics (ERATO 0190295767723)
- George Frideric Handel: Italian Cantatas. Lea Desandre, Le Concert d'Astrée (Emmanuelle Haïm). Released 23 November 2018 by Erato – Warner Classics.
- Wolfgang Amadeus Mozart: Libertà! Mozart & the opera. Ensemble Pygmalion (Raphaël Pichon). Released 30 August 2019 by Harmonia Mundi.
- Gabriel Fauré, Francis Poulenc, Maurice Ravel, Claude Debussy: Chanson d'Amour. Alexandre Tharaud. Released 11 September 2020 by Erato – Warner Classics
