= Lycée André Maurois (Deauville) =

Secondary school in Deauville, France

Coordinates: 49.3638°N 0.0743°E

The Lycée André Maurois is a secondary school in Deauville, France.

== History ==
During World War II, the Lycée Malherbe was forced to seek refuge in a hotel in Deauville. The new school was set up in the Hôtel de la Terrasse. Once the war was over, an annexe was kept open.

The annexe became autonomous in 1963. In 1970 began the construction of a purpose-built building on the beach in front of the hotel. The new building was a grouping of the collège and the lycée. In September 1988, the former hotel was demolished for a new residential building, the Regency.

In the mid-1990s, faced with increasing numbers of students, the construction of an extension was decided. The new wing was to be built connected to the collège wing in the North corner. The new extension was opened in September 2004 as well as a common room in the lycée grounds. The school library, CDI, was reorganised in 1998 and modernised, with the installation of Internet-capable computers.

== Statistics ==
The establishment currently has 1100 students enrolled: 620 at the lycée level and 500 at the collège level. The school also shares its premises with higher education BTS students. The establishment is not specialised and caters for baccalauréat sections L, ES and S.

The lycée receives students from Deauville, Trouville-sur-Mer, Pont-l'Évêque, Dozulé and Dives-Cabourg-Houlgate.

Students' parents' professions are mostly linked to tourism, commerce, self- employment, hospitality and catering. The school has been perceived as elitist due to its prominent position next to the beach, casino, marina and other leisure establishments in the affluent town of Deauville. which has not helped with the school's reputation.

The BTS Tourisme section has an excellent reputation thanks to contacts in the industry. It is highly ranked in the specialised press tables and places are in high demand. Thirty-two students are taught in two years with sixteen new students accepted in the first year.

=== Equipment ===
The Lycée André Maurois is equipped for all standard school activities: sciences, reading, Internet browsing and sports. The gymnasium is situated to the northwest of the lycée science block, itself equipped for biology and chemistry classes. A self-service cafeteria-style canteen was built to the east of the teaching buildings.
