= Anna Kasyan =

French opera singer

- Աննա Կասյան
- Born: 7 October 1981 (age 44); Tbilisi, Soviet Georgia
- Occupation: Opera singer (soprano)
- Website: www.annakasyan.com

Anna Kasyan (Armenian: Աննա Կասյան; born 7 October 1981) is a Georgian-born Armenian opera singer (soprano) based in France.

== Early life and education ==
Kasyan began her early musical training by studying piano and violin at the Central Music School for gifted children in Tbilisi, Georgia. From an early age, she participated in many performances as a soloist. At the age of nine, she made her debut with an orchestra. In 1999, Kasyan entered Tbilisi State Conservatory in violin class. By this time she became interested in singing and in 2001, she continued studying singing at the same Conservatoryby professor Svetlana Egorova.

After completing her musical education, Kasyan continued her studies in France. Since 2003, she pursued singing classes at the Ecole Normale de Musique de Paris, where she graduated in 2008 with the Diploma of Higher Concertiste with unanimous approval. Simultaneous to her studies, Kasyan also entered "cycle du perfectionnement" (specialization) at Conservatoire de Paris between 2004 and 2006. Kasyan participated in master classes led by Tom Krause, Raina Kabaivanska, Viorica Cortez, Janine Reiss and baroque music with Nicolau de Figueiredo and Jory Vinikour.

== Awards and nominations ==
Kasyan is a prize-winner of numerous international competitions, including the 1st Renata Tebaldi International Competition in San Marino (organized by the Renata Tebaldi Foundation in 2005, Second Prize); a First Prize in Singing Musical Autumn Festival, Adams, then a 1st Prize in Singing Competition in Pretoria. She was the winner of the Meyer Foundation award for the years 2004–2005.

Kasyan was selected by Adami (Society for Administration of Rights of Artists, Musicians and Performers) for Revelations Classics 2006.

In May 2008, she participated in International Queen Elisabeth Music Competition in Belgium. She gave an outstanding performance and the competition went well for Kasyan: 24 candidates were selected out of 72 eligible to compete. Kasyan participated in the semi-final on 13 May 2008. At the end of the semi-finals, she was one of the 12 finalists, and then became the winner of the 4th prize in this very prestigious competition held every four years.

On 12 June 2009, Anna Kasyan won the Grand Prix at the 3rd International Singing Competition at the 71st Strasbourg Music Festival under the chairmanship of Barbara Hendricks.

In 2010, Anna Kasyan was nominated for the Victoires de la Musique Classique award.

In 2012, Anna Kasyan was selected by Ararat as being among top 50 most influential Armenians today, among other notable names such as Charles Aznavour, Serj Tankian, Ruben Vardanian and others.

== Performances ==
Being an active performer, Kasyan has sung in prestigious halls such as Carnegie Hall, Opéra de Genève, Saint Petersburg, Salle Cortot in Paris, UNESCO, Cité de la Musique, gives concerts in San Marino and in Italy.

In December 2005, she made the notable performance of Mozart's Requiem at St. Eustache Church in Paris.

In 2006, she sang Rachmaninoff-Scarlatti-Haendel in Paris. She also performed works of Armenian composer Garbis Aprikian before her Mozart concert in Toulouse. Her talent was rewarded again in the same year 2006, when she received: the 3rd Prize in Opera category, Mozart Prize and the Best Opera Singer Prize at the ARD International Music Competition in Munich, and 1 Song Award at the International Pamplona.

In 2007, she performed in Basel, where she performed songs of Schubert and French opera arias. The artist also gave a series of Mozart concerts in Warsaw, Zurich, Osnabrück, Pamplona and Toulouse and appeared in recital at the Festival of Sacred Music in Nice, and at the Opera de Toulon (Jano in Jenufa).

Her recently notable roles include Zerlina in Mozart's Don Giovanni, Despina in Mozart's Così fan tutte, Rosina in Rossini's The Barber of Seville and Norina in Donizetti's Don Pasquale.

In September 2019, with the baritone Adam Barro, she was the head of the concert organized in tribute to Komitas in the Church of the Madeleine in Paris.
