= Les Paladins (music ensemble) =

Les Paladins is a French instrumental and vocal ensemble specialising in the performance and recording of rarely performed Baroque music. It was founded in 2001 and takes its name from Rameau's opera Les Paladins. The ensemble's founder and conductor is the baritone singer and harpsichordist, Jérôme Correas.

== Repertoire ==
Two of the ensemble's ten recordings are from live performances at the Festival de musique baroque d'Ambronay—Hasse's cantata Serpentes ignei in deserto (Fiery Serpents in the Desert) and Soleils Baroques, a concert of music by Luigi Rossi and Marco Marazzoli which included their setting of the cantata Il predica del sole (The Sun's Sermon). Les Paladins' recording of Cavalli's rarely performed opera L'Ormindo for Pan Classics using historically informed performance practice, was awarded the Preis der deutschen Schallplattenkritik Bestenliste (Quarterly Critics' Choice) in 2007. The ensemble also gave France's first performance in modern times of Virgilio Mazzocchi and Marco Marazzoli's opera L'Egisto. The new production premiered at the Abbaye de Royaumont in July 2011, followed by a tour of other French theatres, including the Théâtre de l'Athénée in Paris in December of that year.

== Discography ==
- Handel: Cantates et duos italiens (Sandrine Piau, soloist). Label: Arion (2001)
- Handel: Apollo e Dafne, Label: Arion (2002)
- Porpora: Leçons des ténèbres. Label: Arion (2005)
- Carissimi: Histoires sacrées. Label: Pan Classics (2005)
- Hasse: Serpentes ignei in deserto. Label: Ambronay Éditions (2006)
- Mazzocchi: Madrigali dialoghi. Label: Pan Classics (2006)
- Cavalli: L'Ormindo. Label: Pan Classics (2006)
- Rossi and Marazzoli: Soleils Baroques. Label: Ambronay Éditions (2008)
- Le Triomphe de l'amour (Sandrine Piau, soloist). Label: Naïve (2011)
- Tenebris. Label: Cyprès (2012)
