= Ritmo di Sant'Alessio =

Late twelfth-century metrical vita of the legendary saint Alexius of Rome

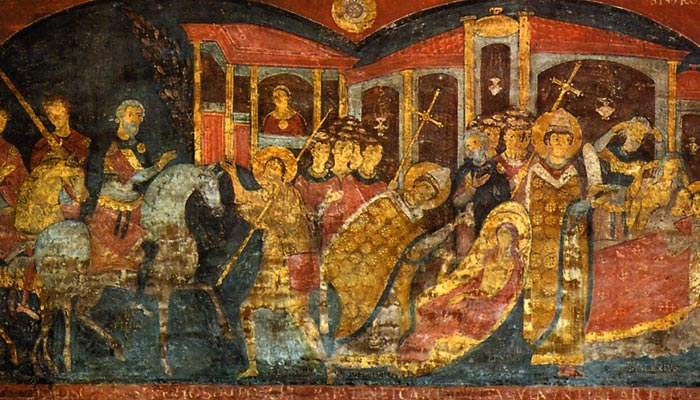
The legend of Alexius, from a fresco in the Basilica di San Clemente

The Ritmo di Sant'Alessio or Ritmo marchigiano su Sant'Alessio is a late twelfth-century metrical vita of the legendary saint Alexius of Rome composed for public performance by an anonymous giullare. It is one of the earliest pieces of Italian literature.

The cult of Alexius was mainly promoted by the Benedictines, starting in Italy. In the tenth century a Greek vita was adapted to Latin prose. In the eleventh century his legend, based on the Latin version, was versified in Old French as the Vie de Saint Alexis. Later, in the thirteenth century a second Italian version, De vita Beati Alexii, this time in the Lombard dialect, was composed by Bonvesin de la Riva.

The Ritmo was conserved in a manuscript of the Benedictine convent of Santa Vittoria in Matenano near Fermo, a daughter house of the Abbey of Farfa. The codex is now in the Biblioteca Comunale of Ascoli Piceno, catalogued as XXV A. 51, c. 130 f. According to Bruno Migliorini, the poet also hailed from the Marche, and according to its first editor, Gianfranco Contini, the Ritmo is composed in "a koiné of East Central Italy, whose cultural capital was undoubtedly Montecassino." It has thus many affinities with the Ritmo cassinese: written about the same time (broadly) in the same region, metrically and linguistically similar, Benedictine in religion, and both monastic in provenance and giullaresco in style, designed for popular audience and public performance.

The Ritmo is divided into twenty-seven stanzas of varied length. Each stanza opens with four to thirteen monorhyming octonaries or novenaries and closes with a deca- or hendecasyllabic couplet of a different rhyme, often rich or homonymic. The discrepancies and irregularities in the prosody may be attributed to the copyist, but also to the numerous Latinisms and Gallicisms. As it stands the Ritmo is incomplete, stopping abruptly after 257 slow-paced lines, just before the arrival of Euphemian's servants at Edessa. It does encompass Alexius' birth, marriage, exhortations to his wife, flight to Laodicea, and the beginnings of his mendicancy.

== Editions ==
- Poeti del Duecento, vol. 1. Gianfranco Contini, ed. Milan and Naples: Ricciardi, 1960, pp. 15–28.
- Early Italian Texts. Carlo Dionisotti and Cecil Grayson, edd. 2nd ed. Oxford: Blackwell, 1965 [1949], pp. 45–75.
