= Lycée Malherbe =

Coordinates: 49°10′32″N 0°22′21″W

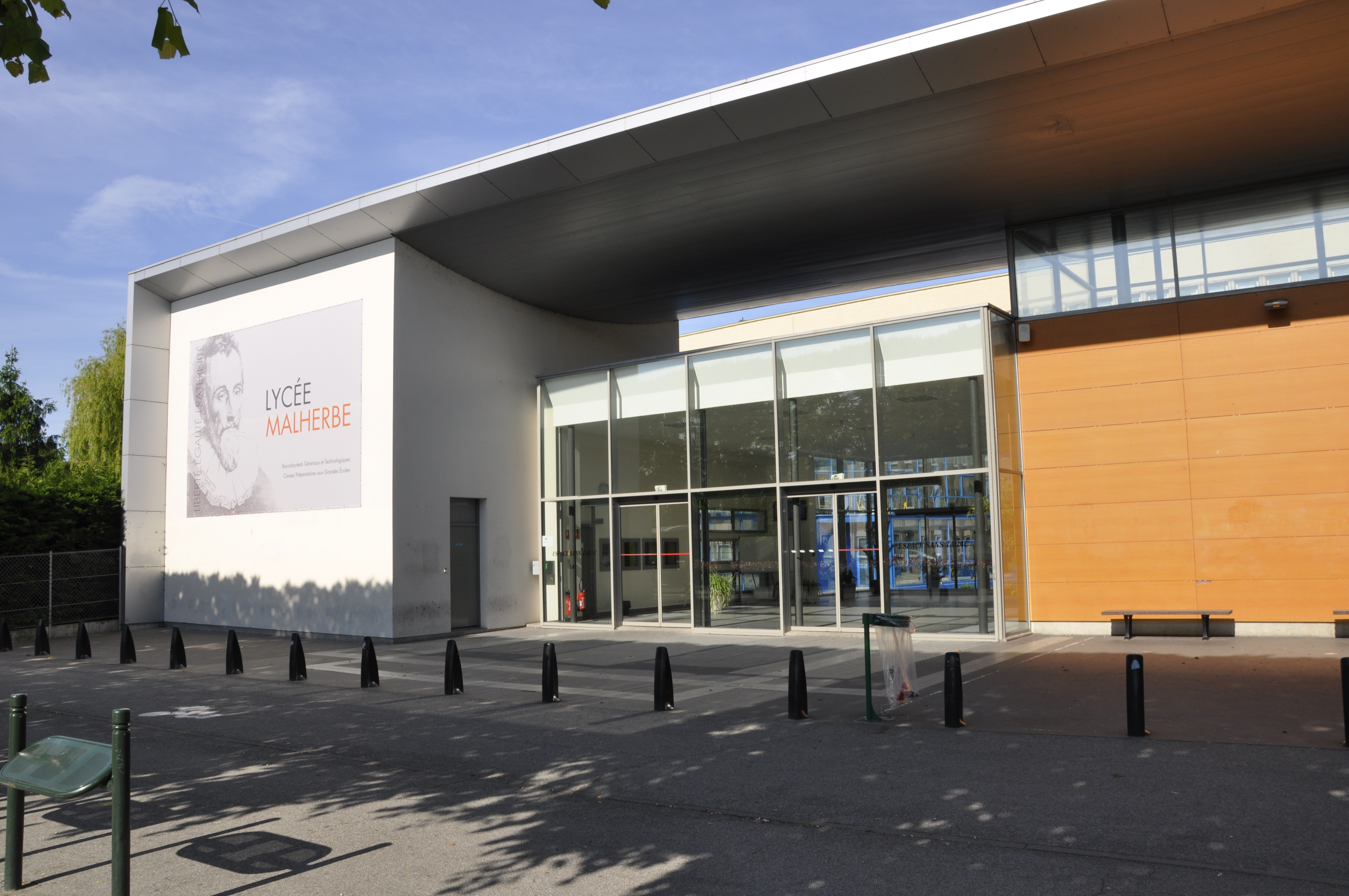

Location
- Caen; France

Information
- Type: Lycée
- Established: 1804; 221 years ago
- Principal: Jean-Christophe Bidet

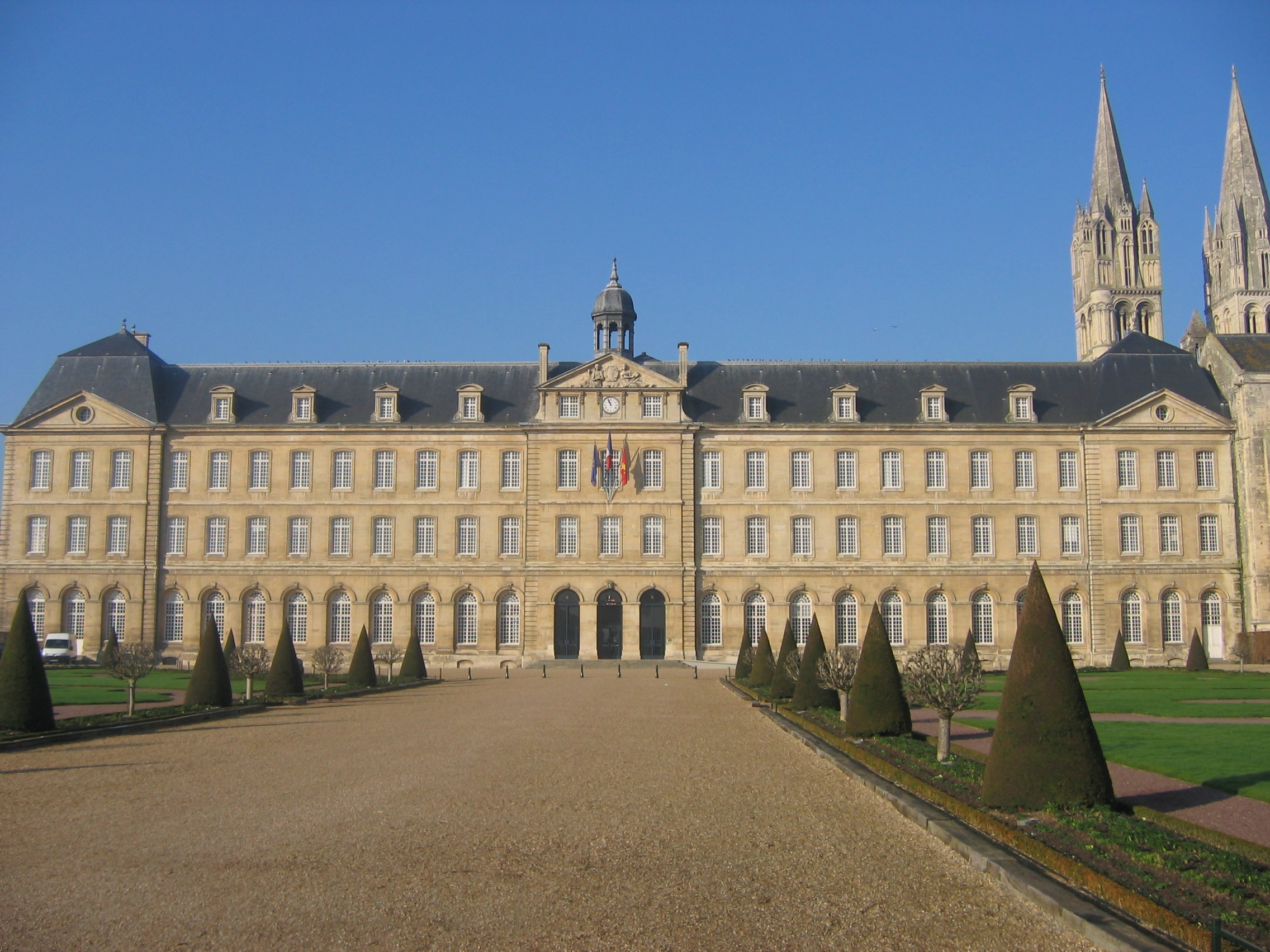
Lycée Malherbe's former home

The Lycée Malherbe is a secondary school in Caen, France.

== History ==
Since its foundation, Caen has always been an important cultural centre. The University of Caen was founded in 1432. Early 19th century, the Abbaye-aux-Hommes became the seat of a secondary school which was to replace the Écoles Centrales du Calvados, de la Manche et de l'Orne. This new school opened in the south transept of the abbey with one hundred students on 20 July 1804.

It is not before the 19 August 1892 that the establishment was named Lycée Malherbe, in honour of François de Malherbe, a famous caennais. The school survived World War II, during which teaching continued, albeit having most of its classes moved the Lycée André Maurois in Deauville where the Baccalauréat exams were moved to. The Lycée Malherbe moved from its prestigious premises in 1961 to move to its new location, along the racecourse, in the prairie.

== Alumni ==
- Alain Genestar
- Sabine Devieilhe
- Malika Ménard
- Michel Drucker
