= Péter Csaba =

Hungarian violinist and conductor

Péter Csaba (born 7 November 1952 in Cluj) is a Romanian violinist and conductor of Hungarian ethnic origin.

== Career ==
Csaba was the artistic director and permanent conductor of the Swedish chamber orchestra Musica Vitae between 1993 and 2000. He is the artistic director of the chamber orchestra Virtuosi di Kuhmo in Finland, and since 1996, the musical director of the Orchestre Symphonique de Besançon. Since 1996 he has led the Orchestra Class of the Conservatoire National Supérieur de Musique de Lyon. Péter Csaba is artistic director of the Festival Lappland Festspiel in Arjeplog in Sweden.
