= Symphonia (record label) =

Symphonia Sas was an Italian classical record label directed by Roberto Meo and Sigrid Lee. Meo was also engineer for the label. After 2010 the label began to license recordings from its back catalogue to Glossa Music, Spain, and Pan Classics, Switzerland.
