= Alexis Kossenko =

French flautist, conductor, and musicologist

Alexis Kossenko (born 1977 in Nice) is a French contemporary flautist, conductor and musicologist.

== Education ==
Kossenko followed the courses of flautist Alain Marion at the Conservatoire National Supérieur de Paris, where he obtained a First Prize, as well as those of Marten Root at the Conservatorium van Amsterdam, which awarded him a soloist's degree.

== Career ==
=== As flautist ===
Kossenko's career as a flutist includes regular collaborations with many ensembles such as La Chambre Philharmonique, Le Concert d'Astrée, Stradivaria, the Ensemble Matheus, the Orchestre Révolutionnaire et Romantique, the Barokksolistene, the Philharmonie der Nationen, the Orchestre de chambre de Paris, the Orchestre d'Auvergne, Anima Eterna, the Orchestre Révolutionnaire et Romantique, the Kölner Akademie, La Grande Écurie et la Chambre du Roy, the Concerto Copenhagen, the ensemble Capriccio Stravagante Les Paladins, Le Concert Spirituel, the Cercle de l'Harmonie, the European Union Baroque Orchestra.

=== As conductor ===
Alongside his career as a flautist, Kossenko developed conductor activities as guest conductor of ensembles B'Rock (Belgium), Holland Baroque Society (Netherlands), European Union Baroque Orchestra, Le Concert d'Astrée (France) and Arte dei Suonatori (Poland).

In 2010, Kossenko established the international ensemble of Baroque music on ancient instruments and of classical music Les Ambassadeurs.

In October 2019 he was named incoming music director of the French period instrument orchestra, Grande Écurie et la Chambre du Roy, to begin in 2020.

== Discography ==
=== With the ensemble Arte dei Suonatori ===
- Complete concertos by Carl Philipp Emanuel Bach (10 de Classica Répertoire, 5 étoiles de Goldberg, Choc du Monde de la Musique)(Alpha)
- Leçons de ténèbres by Marc-Antoine Charpentier with Stephan MacLeod (baritone) (Alpha)
- Concertos for flûte by Antonio Vivaldi (Editor's Choice de Gramophone) (Alpha)

=== With the orchestra Les Ambassadeurs ===
- 2013: Concerti per l'Orchestra di Dresda by Antonio Vivaldi (Alpha)
- 2013: Le Grand Théâtre de l'Amour by Jean-Philippe Rameau with Sabine Devieilhe (soprano), Samuel Boden (tenor), Aimery Lefevre (baritone) and the Jeune Chœur de Paris (Erato)
- 2014: Trio sonatas by Carl Philipp Emanuel Bach (Alpha)
- 2015: Operture & Concerti for Darmstadt by Telemann (Alpha)
- 2021: Per l'Orchestra di Dresda by various composers (Johann David Heinichen, Jan Dismas Zelenka, Georg Philipp Telemann, Johann Joachim Quantz, Johann Georg Pisendel)

== Bibliography ==
- Conversation with Alexis Kossenko, in Remy Campos, Le Conservatoire de Paris et son histoire, une institution en questions, Paris, L'Œil d'or, 2016, ISBN 978-2-913661-79-0
