= Boësset =

Boësset is a French surname. Notable people with the surname include:

- Antoine Boësset (1587–1643), French musician
- Jean-Baptiste Boësset (1614–1685), French musician, son of Antoine
