= Mireille Alcantara =

French singer

Mireille Alcantara is a soprano and singing teacher both at the Conservatoire de Paris and the École Normale de Musique de Paris.

She has had several known singers as students: Karine Deshayes, Delphine Haidan, Tatiana Probst, among others.

She is the founder president of the Festival de musique Gloriana in the Var department.
