= Ambroisie =

French classical music record label

Ambroisie is a French classical music record label founded in 1999 by Nicolas Bartholomée, and later sold to Naïve Records. The label released mainly French classical artists, some of whom, including Christophe Rousset, later released on Bartholomée's new label Aparté.
