= Marie-Josèphe Jude =

French pianist

Marie-Josèphe Jude (born 25 February 1968) is a French pianist. Jude studied at the Conservatoire de Paris.

== Biography ==
She was born to a French father and a Sino-Vietnamese mother. As a child, Jude began by studying harp and piano in Nice, later receiving a diploma in piano performance and a B.Mus. in harp performance from Ecole Normale de Musique in Paris.

In 1989, she was a finalist in the Clara Haskil International Piano Competition.
