= Dominique de Williencourt =

French cellist and composer (born 1959)

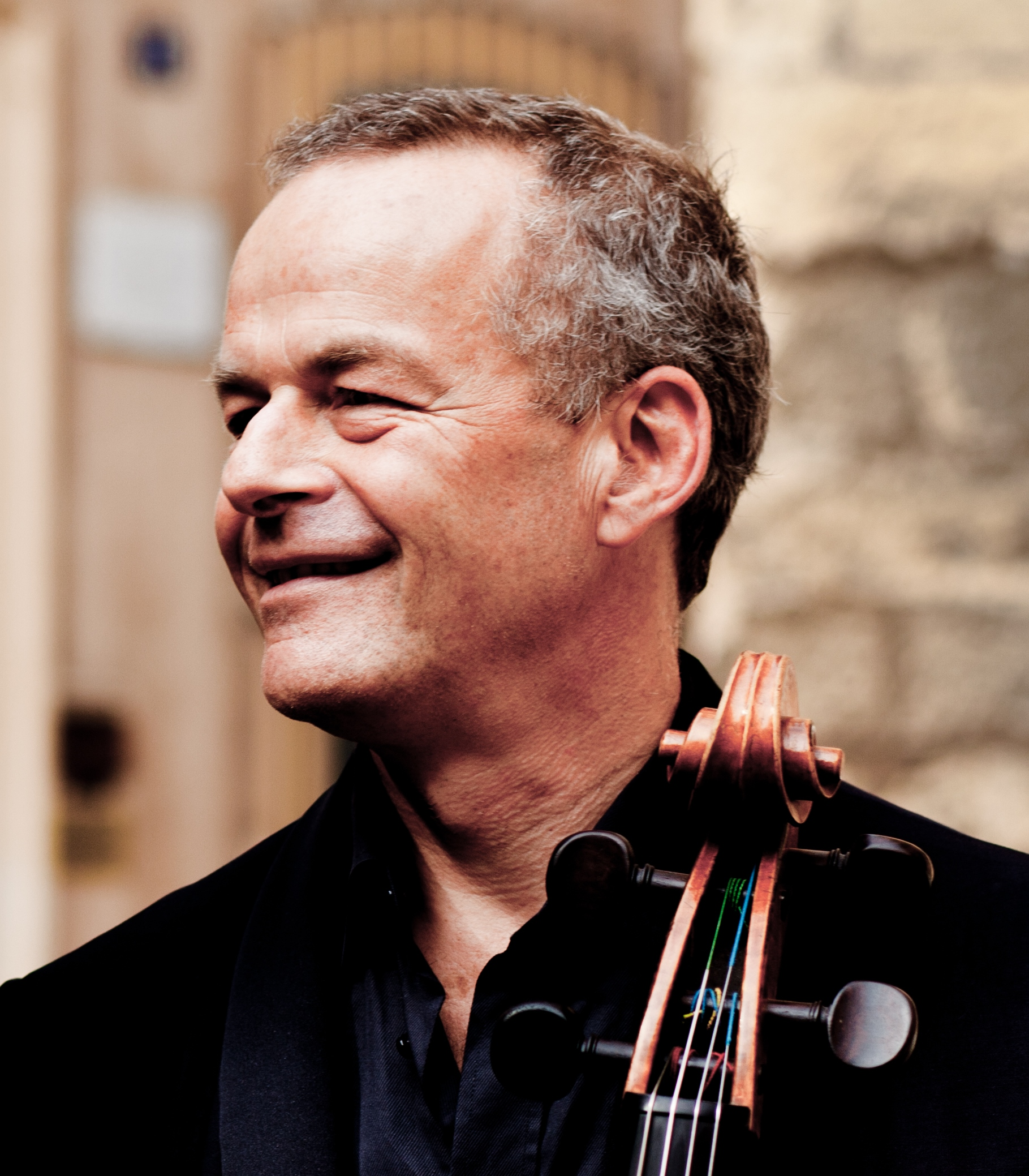
Dominique de Williencourt en 2015.

Dominique de Williencourt is a French cellist and composer, born in Lille in 1959.

== Works ==
- Abraham and Isaac, opus 7, for baritone, flute and string orchestra. First performed in the Théâtre des Champs-Elysées, Paris, February 2007
- Etchmiadzin and Mount Ararat, Opus 3, for cello. It is based on Armenian themes. Commissioned by Rencontres Musicales in Lorraine, first performed July 1998.
- Edgédé, The singing dune, opus 4, for flute. Edgédé means "dune" in Touareg. First performed at Théâtre Marigny, Paris, November 2002.
- Dharamsala, the Mountain of Spices, opus 2, for cello octet. The piece is in homage to Tibetans who were treated in the hospital in Dharamsala which bears the inscription TSV: Torture Survivor Victims. First performed in the Notre Dame de Paris cathedral, by 200 cellos, in December 1999.
- Beer-sheba, opus 5, for cello and string orchestra. Commissioned by the Chamber Orchestra of Vilnius to celebrate Lithuania's accession to the European Union. For flute, viola, cello and string orchestra, commissioned by the Institut de France, in 2005.
- Le Fou de Yalta for soprano and piano.
