= Salv'a lo vescovo senato =

Salv'a lo vescovo senato, also known as the Cantilena giullaresca, because it was written for performance by a jongleur, or Ritmo laurenziano, because it was found in a codex (Santa Croce XV, IV) of the Biblioteca Mediceo Laurenziana in Florence, is a lyric poem in the Tuscan language. It was probably composed in the third quarter of the twelfth century (1150–71) by a Tuscan poet. It is the earliest surviving piece of poetry in an unmistakably Italian dialect.

Salv'a lo vescovo senato comprises twenty monorhyming ottonari. In the same manuscript is found a martyrology. Two internal references in the poem constrain its dating: a mention of Galgano Inghirami, Bishop of Volterra from 1150 to 1157, and of Grimaldo, Bishop of Osimo from 1151 to 1157. Bruno Migliorini describes the poem:

Il giullare si rivolge a un vescovo (Villano, arcivescovo di Pisa, secondo l'ipotesi del Cesareo, accolta dal Mazzoni) facendone lodi sperticate e pronosticandogli nientemeno che il pontificato, con la speranza di ottenere in dono un cavallo: se lo ottiene, lo mostrerà al vescovo di Volterra, Galgano.
The jongleur addresses a bishop (Villano, Archbishop of Pisa, according to the hypothesis of Cesareo, following Mazzoni) making drawn-out praises and go so far as to predict for him a pontificate, in the hopes of obtaining a horse: if he obtains it, he will show it to the bishop of Volterra, Galgano.
