= Jérémie Rhorer =

French conductor (born 1973)

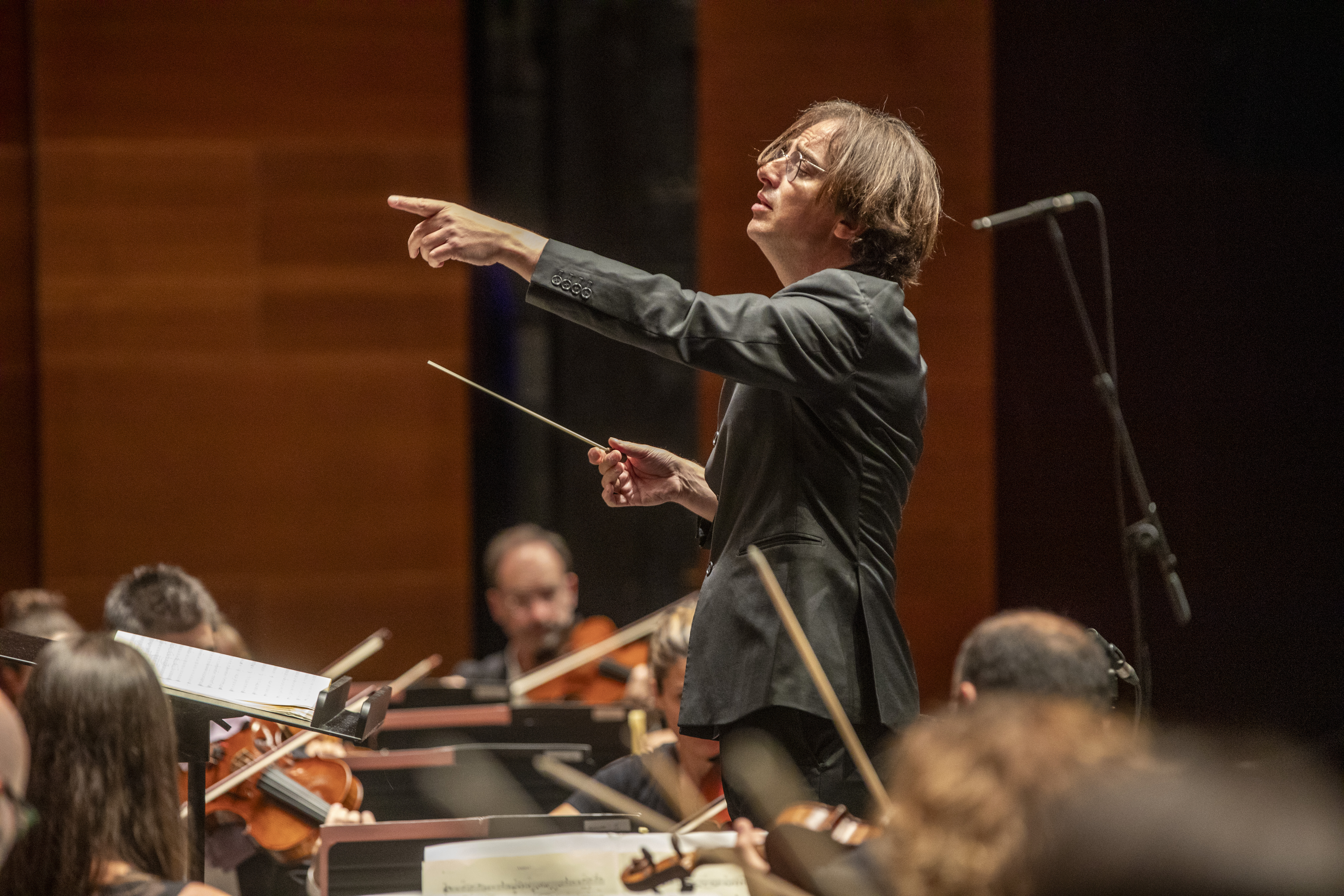
Jérémie Rhorer, 2024

Jérémie Rhorer (born 15 July 1973 in Paris) is a French conductor and the founding artistic director of Le Cercle de l'Harmonie, a period instrument ensemble dedicated to the music of the 18th and 19th centuries. Rhorer is also a well-respected composer, having won the Prix Pierre Cardin.

== Education ==
As a youth, he studied the harpsichord, flute, and composition at the Conservatoire National de Région de Paris. He continued his musical studies in harpsichord, theory and composition at the Conservatoire de Paris. His teachers and mentors have included Emil Tchakarov, William Christie and Marc Minkowski.

== Le Cercle de l'Harmonie ==
In 2005, Rhorer and violinist Julien Chauvin co-founded the period-instrument orchestra Le Cercle de l'Harmonie. The ensemble focuses on recreating performance practices, traditions, and original instrumentation of 18th and 19th century music. Rhorer and Le Cercle de l'Harmonie have made commercial recordings for such labels as Virgin Classics. The orchestra made its UK debut in 2011 at the Barbican Centre, and its debut at The Proms in July 2016. Rhorer made his USA conducting debut in 2008 with the Chamber Orchestra of Philadelphia. Their most recent performances included Rossini's Il Barbiere di Siviglia on period instruments at the Edinburgh International Festival and Musikfest Bremen in Summer 2018, and Verdi's La traviata using the original 432 HZ tuning at Théâtre des Champs-Elysées, directed by Deborah Werner.

== Guest conductor ==
As a guest conductor, Rhorer has appeared with orchestras throughout Europe and North America, including Montréal Symphony Orchestra, the Philharmonia Orchestra, the Gewandhaus Orchestra, the Rotterdam Philharmonic, the Orchestre de Paris, and the Czech Philharmonic, and in opera houses including the Vienna State Opera, the Bavarian State Opera, La Monnaie in Brussels, the Teatro Real in Madrid, and the Teatro Comunale di Bologna. He has been invited to conduct at international festivals such as Aix-en-Provence, Glyndebourne, Edinburgh, the BBC Proms, the Salzburg Festival, and the Spoleto Festival. Rhorer made his U.S. debut in 2008 with the Chamber Orchestra of Philadelphia.

In the 2018–2019 season, Rhorer conducted the Orchestra della Svizzera Italiana, Kammerorchester Basel, the London Philharmonic in Rossini's Stabat Mater and Orff's Carmina Burana, the Teatro la Fenice Orchestra, Brucknerorchester Linz, Deutsche Kammerphilharmonie Bremen, the Russian National Orchestra in Moscow and on tour in Germany and Austria.

In March 2019, Rhorer returned to Théâtre des Champs-Elysées to conduct Richard Strauss's Ariadne auf Naxos in a production by Katie Mitchell.

== Composer ==
As a composer, Rhorer's works include Le cimetière des enfants (versions for piano and for orchestra), a Cello Concerto composed for Jérôme Pernoo (2014), and a Piano Concerto commissioned by the Philharmonia Orchestra for Jean-Yves Thibaudet (2017).

== Discography ==
- Domenico Cimarosa: Requiem, 2 CDs, Valerie Gabail, Katalin Verkonyi, Etienne Lescroart, Ronan Nedelec, Choeur de Chambre des Musiciens du Louvre, La Philharmonie de Chambre, Jérémie Rhorer Ligia 2002
- Henri Reber (1807–1880): Symphony No 4, op. 33, Bertrand Chamayou, Julien Chauvin, Le Cercle de L'Harmonie, Jérémie Rhorer
- Mozart: Donna – Diana Damrau, Le Cercle de l'Harmonie, Jérémie Rhorer
- J. C. Bach arias – La dolce Fiamma; Philippe Jaroussky, Le Cercle de l'Harmonie, Jeremie Rhorer
- Joseph Haydn: Organ Concertos H. 18, Nos 1, 2, and 6, Olivier Vernet, Ensemble Les Sauvages, Jérémie Rhorer
- Mozart: Symphonies Nos 25, 26, and 29, Le Cercle de l'Harmonie, Jérémie Rhorer
- Diana Damrau – Arie di Bravura Salieri, Vincenzo Righini, Mozart. Le Cercle de l'Harmonie, Jérémie Rhorer
- Beethoven: The Birth of a Master – Alexandra Coku, Julien Chauvin, Le Cercle de l'Harmonie, Jérémie Rhorer
- Luigi Cherubini: Lodoïska – Nathalie Manfrino, Hjordis Tebault, Sebastien Gueze, Philippe Do, Le Cercle de l'Harmonie, Jérémie Rhorer
- Mozart: Die Entführung aus dem Serail – Jane Archibald, Norman Reinhardt, Mischa Schelomianski, David Portillo, Rachele Gilmore, Christoph Guest, Le Cercle de l'Harmonie, Jérémie Rhorer
- Mozart: Don Giovanni – Jean-Sébastian Boux, Robert Gleadow, Myrto Papatanasiu, Julie Boulianne, Julien Behr, Anna Grevelius, Marc Scoffoni, Steven Humes, Le Cercle de l'Harmonie, Jérémie Rhorer
- Mozart: La clemenza di Tito – Kurt Streit, Karina Gauvin, Julie Fuchs, Kate Lindsey, Julie Boulianne, Robert Gleadow, Le Cercle de l'Harmonie, Jérémie Rhorer
- DVD André Grétry, L'amant jaloux: Magali Léger, Daphne Touchais, Maryline Fallot, Brad Cooper, Le Cercle de l'Harmonie, Jérémie Rhoher
