= Julien Chauvin =

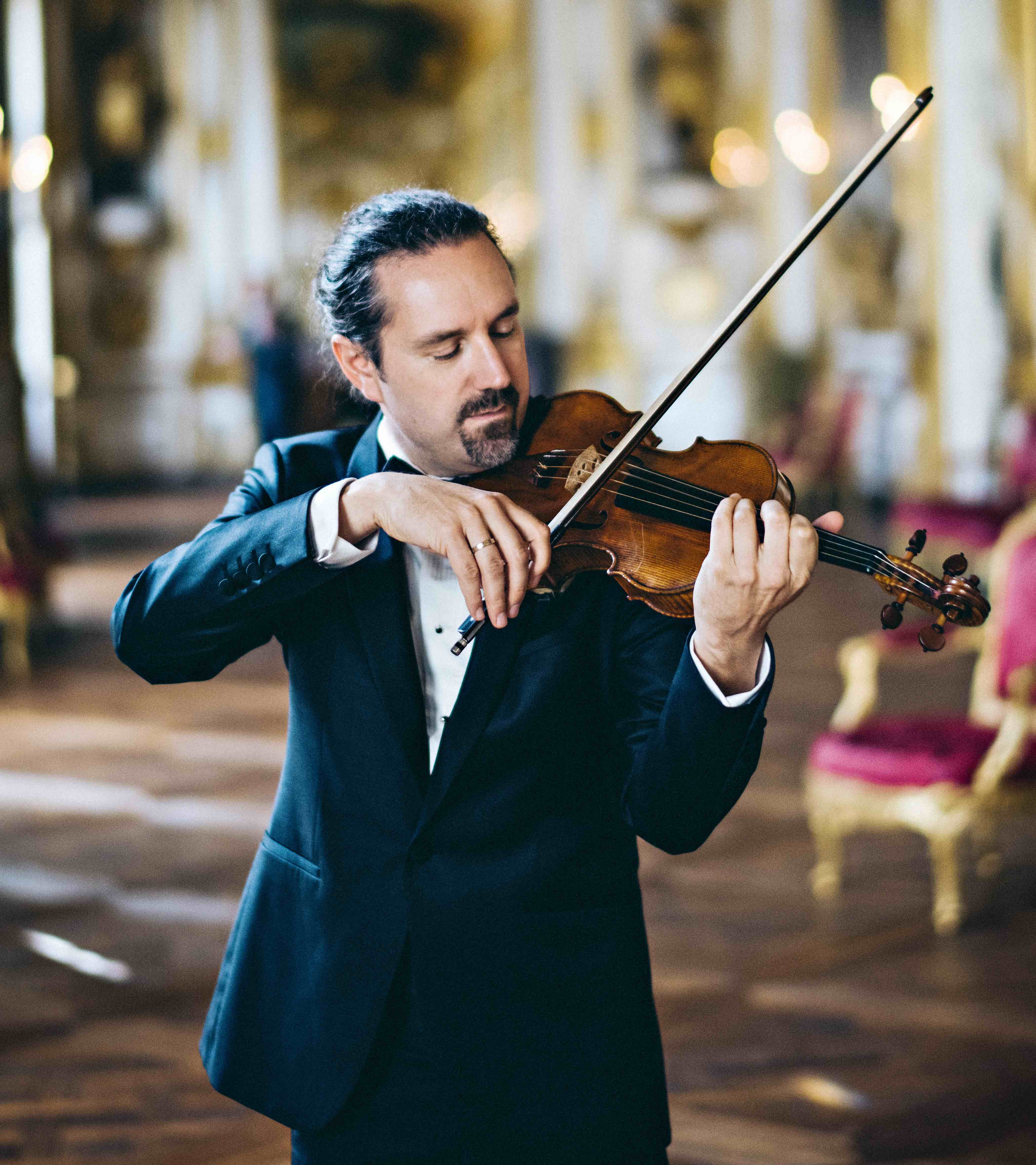

Founder of Le Concert de la Loge

Julien Chauvin (born 1979) is a French violinist and music director, specialized in the interpretation on period instruments and gut strings, co-founder of the orchestra the Cercle de l'Harmonie (2004-2014), as well as the Cambini-Paris Quartet (2007), and founder of the Concert de la Loge Olympique (2015).

== Biography ==
Born in Fontainebleau, Chauvin studied in the Netherlands at the Royal Conservatory of The Hague with Vera Beths and perfected his skills with Wilbert Hazelzet, Jaap ter Linden and Anner Bylsma.

In 2003, he was laureate of the MAfestival Brugge.

He has a career as soloist, guest violinist, chamber musician and musical director.

In 2015, he decided to end his collaboration with Jérémie Rhorer to found a new orchestra, the Concert de la Loge Olympique, specialized in the interpretation of baroque, classical and romantic repertoires on ancient instruments.

Since 2008, he has also been working at the INSEAD, alongside Professor Ian Woodward, in training seminars for business leaders.

His discography includes eight discs recorded with the Cercle de l'Harmonie and the conductor Jérémie Rhorer for Virgin Classics, Eloquentia and Ambroisie-Naïve labels and five discs with the Cambini-Paris Quartet for the Timpani, MBF and Ambroisie-Naïve labels.
