= Arion (record label) =

French record label

Arion Music
- Arion's logo depicting the lyre of its namesake, the ancient Greek poet Arion
- Parent company: Ducale
- Founded: 1962
- Founder: Ariane Segal
- Genre: Classical music, world
- Country of origin: France
- Location: Paris

Arion is a French record company and label founded in 1962 by Ariane Segal. The label takes its name from the ancient Greek poet and lyre-player, Arion. In the 1960s and 1970s Arion was seen as one of the most adventurous and innovative independent labels in France with an eclectic catalogue ranging from classical music to ethnic music to jazz. Its strengths were, and remain, rarely performed classical works and ethnic music.

== History ==
In 1962 Ariane Segal, who had been working as a producer for the French division of Ricordi, left the firm with her entire team, including her sound engineer Claude Morel. She established a new independent label, Arion, serving as its president and managing director, while Morel served as the label's artistic director. By 1967 when Arion signed a US distribution deal with CBS, its recordings had already received prizes from the Académie Charles Cros and the Académie du disque français. While most single LPs produced in France during the 1960s and 70s were packaged in sleeves, Arion's records were presented in books with copious liner notes, most of which were written by Segal herself.

With the arrival of the compact disc, Arion, with its large catalogue of vinyl records, lacked the financial resources to convert to the new medium. Rather than selling the company to one of her rivals, Segal sold it to the Italian firm Ducale, who had distributed the Arion label in Italy and had begun buying stock in Arion in 1984. Ducale's owner, David Matalon, took over as president of Arion in 1985. His daughter Manuela Matalon Ostrolenk became the managing director, while Segal stayed on as head of A&R for the label's classical division. Shortly after Matalon's takeover, Arion announced plans for its first four releases on compact disc. These included Les flutes de terres Incas performed by the Andean music ensemble Los Calchakis and Guillaume Bouzignac's Motets et scènes sacrées.

In the ensuing years Arion gradually re-released the recordings in its vinyl catalogue on CD as well as continuing to produce new CD recordings and in 1997 acquired the Pierre Verany label. As of 2015 Manuela Ostrolenk serves as both president and CEO of Arion. Ariane Segal, who was described by one of her colleagues at Ricordi as "a remarkable woman, way ahead of her time", died in 2011 at the age of 93.

== Repertoire ==
Although from its inception Arion produced recordings in a range of genres, including jazz, dance, and film soundtracks, its core repertoire has been classical and ethnic music from around the world, including the traditional folk music of France. Between 1974 and 1984, Arion produced over 30 LP recordings of ethnic music for the French organization Maison des Cultures du Monde, many of which have subsequently been re-released on CD by the organization's own label. In the classical repertoire, Arion was known for championing composers who had fallen into obscurity such as Hyacinthe Jadin and contemporary composers such as Maurice Ohana as well as the forgotten works of established composers. An example of the latter was their 1993 recording of Daniel Auber's opera Gustave III, ou Le bal masqué, composed thirty-five years prior to Verdi's more famous setting, Un ballo in maschera. Under Ariane Segal, Arion also recorded 40 LPs of music by women composers, including that of the medieval troubador Beatritz de Dia. Amongst the label's larger-scale classical music projects were Bach's complete Well-Tempered Clavier recorded between 1972 and 1975 by organist Louis Thiry (ARN 468306) and the complete piano works of Emmanuel Chabrier recorded by Alexandre Tharaud in 1998 (ARN 368722).
