= Pan Classics =

Swiss classical music record label

Pan Classics is a Swiss classical music record label. It was founded in 1992 by Pan Music of Zurich. In 1997 the classical label was acquired by the recording engineers Clément Spiess and Koichiro Hattori, and relocated to Vevey, on Lake Geneva The Pan Classics engineering team is known as Sound Arts. Since 2011 the label has been reissuing some of the back catalogue of Symphonia with new artwork. The label is distributed in the UK by Proper Music Distribution.
