= June 2 =

June 2 this year in various calendars
- Tuesday, 2 June 2026
Akan	Kwabene
Armenian	17 Margach 1475
Aztec	Teotleco 3, 1 Ozomahtli
Babylonian	15 Ayaru, 2337 SE
Balinese pawukon	Luang, Pepet, Beteng, Jaya, Keliwon, Was, Anggara of Julungwangi, Guru, Jangur, Pati
Bengali	19 Joishtho, BS 1433
Chinese	Yin Fire Goat・Tail Mansion; Fire Horse Year, Month 4, Day 17 (Xiaoman, 3 days until Mangzhong)
Common Era	2 June 2026 CE
Coptic	25 Pashons, AM 1742
Egyptian	17 Phaophi, 2775 NE
Ethiopian	25 Genbot, 2018 Amätä Məhrät
French Republican	Décade II, Quartidi de Prairial de l'Année 234 de la République
Gregorian	2 June, AD 2026
Hebrew	17 Sivan, AM 5786
Hindu	Mūla・Sādhya; Solar: 19 Jyeṣṭha, 1948 SE; Lunisolar: Dvitīyā, Kṛishna pakṣa of Adhika Jyeṣṭha, 2083 VE; Rāudra・5127 KY・1,872,728
Icelandic	Þriðjudagur, 11 Skerpla 2026
Islamic	16 Dhu al-Hijjah, AH 1447 (using tabular method)
ISO week date	2026-W23-2
Japanese	17 Uzuki, Reiwa 8 (Shōman, 4 days until Bōshu)
Julian	20 May, AD 2026 (AM 7534)
Julian day	2461194
Korean	17 Baemdal, 4359 DE
Maya	13.0.13.11.11; 4 Zotz, 1 Chuen
Roman	ante diem XIII Kalendas Iunias, MMDCCLXXIX AUC
Solar Hijri	12 Khordad, SH 1405
Tibetan	17 sa ga, me pho rta 2153 or 1772 or 1000

<<	June					>>
Su	Mo	Tu	We	Th	Fr	Sa
	1	2	3	4	5	6
7	8	9	10	11	12	13
14	15	16	17	18	19	20
21	22	23	24	25	26	27
28	29	30
2026

June 2 in recent years
2026 (Tuesday)
2025 (Monday)
2024 (Sunday)
2023 (Friday)
2022 (Thursday)
2021 (Wednesday)
2020 (Tuesday)
2019 (Sunday)
2018 (Saturday)
2017 (Friday)

June 2 is the 153rd day of the year (154th in leap years) in the Gregorian calendar; 212 days remain until the end of the year.

== Events ==
=== Pre-1600 ===
- 260 – Sima Zhao's regicide of Cao Mao: The figurehead Wei emperor Cao Mao personally leads an attempt to oust his regent, Sima Zhao; the attempted coup is crushed and the emperor killed.
- 455 – Sack of Rome: Vandals enter Rome, and plunder the city for two weeks.
- 575 – Pope Benedict I is consecrated after obtaining imperial approval from Constantinople.
- 1098 – First Crusade: The first Siege of Antioch ends as Crusader forces take the city; the second siege began five days later.
- 1259 – Wedding of Manfred, King of Sicily, and Byzantine princess Helena Angelina Doukaina.

=== 1601–1900 ===
- 1608 – The Colony of Virginia gets a charter, extending borders from "sea to sea".
- 1615 – The first Récollet missionaries arrive at Quebec City, from Rouen, France.
- 1676 – Franco-Dutch War: France ensures the supremacy of its naval fleet for the remainder of the war with its victory in the Battle of Palermo.
- 1692 – Bridget Bishop is the first person to be tried for witchcraft in Salem, Massachusetts; she is found guilty the same day and hanged on June 10.
- 1763 – Pontiac's Rebellion: At what is now Mackinaw City, Michigan, Chippewas capture Fort Michilimackinac by diverting the garrison's attention with a game of lacrosse, then chasing a ball into the fort.
- 1774 – Intolerable Acts: The Quartering Act of 1774 is enacted, allowing a governor in colonial America to house British soldiers in uninhabited houses, outhouses, barns, or other buildings if suitable quarters are not provided.
- 1780 – The anti-Catholic Gordon Riots in London leave an estimated 300 to 700 people dead.
- 1793 – French Revolution: François Hanriot, leader of the Parisian National Guard, arrests 22 Girondists selected by Jean-Paul Marat, setting the stage for the Reign of Terror.
- 1805 – Napoleonic Wars: A Franco-Spanish fleet recaptures from the British the island of Diamond Rock, which guards the entrance to the bay leading to Fort-de-France, Martinique.
- 1848 – The Slavic Congress opens in Prague.
- 1866 – The Fenians defeat Canadian forces at Ridgeway and Fort Erie, but the raids end soon after.
- 1878 - Nobiling assassination attempt by anarchist Karl Nobiling targeting the German Kaiser, Wilhelm I.
- 1896 – Guglielmo Marconi applies for a patent for his wireless telegraph.

=== 1901–present ===
- 1909 – Alfred Deakin becomes Prime Minister of Australia for the third time.
- 1910 – Charles Rolls, a co-founder of Rolls-Royce Limited, becomes the first man to make a non-stop double crossing of the English Channel by plane.
- 1919 – Anarchists simultaneously set off bombs in eight separate U.S. cities.
- 1924 – U.S. President Calvin Coolidge signs the Indian Citizenship Act into law, granting citizenship to all Native Americans born within the territorial limits of the United States.
- 1941 – World War II: German paratroopers murder Greek civilians in the villages of Kondomari and Alikianos.
- 1946 – Birth of the Italian Republic: In a referendum, Italians vote to turn Italy from a monarchy into a Republic. After the referendum, King Umberto II of Italy is exiled.
- 1953 – The coronation of Queen Elizabeth II at Westminster Abbey becomes the first British coronation, and one of the first major international events, to be televised.
- 1955 – The USSR and Yugoslavia sign the Belgrade declaration and thus normalize relations between the two countries, discontinued since 1948.
- 1958 – Aeronaves de México Flight 111 crashes on approach to Guadalajara International Airport, killing 45.
- 1962 – During the FIFA World Cup, police intervene multiple times in fights between Chilean and Italian players in one of the most violent games in football history.
- 1964 – The Palestine Liberation Organization (PLO) is formed.
- 1966 – Surveyor program: Surveyor 1 lands in Oceanus Procellarum on the Moon, becoming the first U.S. spacecraft to soft-land on another world.
- 1967 – Luis Monge is executed in Colorado's gas chamber, in the last pre-Furman execution in the United States.
- 1967 – Protests in West Berlin against the arrival of the Shah of Iran are brutally suppressed, during which Benno Ohnesorg is killed by a police officer. His death results in the founding of the terrorist group 2 June Movement.
- 1979 – Pope John Paul II starts his first official visit to his native Poland, becoming the first Pope to visit a Communist country.
- 1983 – After an emergency landing because of an in-flight fire, twenty-three passengers aboard Air Canada Flight 797 are killed when a flashover occurs as the plane's doors open. Because of this incident, numerous new safety regulations are put in place.
- 1990 – The Lower Ohio Valley tornado outbreak spawns 66 confirmed tornadoes in Illinois, Indiana, Kentucky, and Ohio, killing 12.
- 1997 – In Denver, Timothy McVeigh is convicted on 11 counts of murder and conspiracy for his role in the 1995 bombing of the Alfred P. Murrah Federal Building in Oklahoma City, in which 168 people died. He was executed four years later.
- 1998 – Space Shuttle Discovery is launched on STS-91, the final mission of the Shuttle-Mir program.
- 2003 – Europe launches its first voyage to another planet, Mars. The European Space Agency's Mars Express probe launches from the Baikonur space center in Kazakhstan.
- 2010 – Twelve people are killed and eleven others injured in a spree shooting in Cumbria, England, before the perpetrator takes his own life.
- 2012 – Former Egyptian President Hosni Mubarak is sentenced to life imprisonment for his role in the killing of demonstrators during the 2011 Egyptian revolution.
- 2014 – Telangana officially becomes the 29th state of India, formed from ten districts of northwestern Andhra Pradesh.
- 2022 – Following a request from Ankara, the United Nations officially changes the name of the Republic of Turkey in the organization from what was previously known as "Turkey" to "Türkiye".
- 2023 – A collision between two passenger trains and a parked freight train near the city of Balasor, Odisha in eastern India, results in 296 deaths and more than 1,200 people injured.

== Births ==
=== Pre-1600 ===
- 1305 – Abu Sa'id Bahadur Khan, ruler of Ilkhanate (died 1335)
- 1423 – Ferdinand I of Naples (died 1494)
- 1489 – Charles, Duke of Vendôme (died 1537)
- 1535 – Pope Leo XI (died 1605)

=== 1601–1900 ===
- 1602 – Rudolf Christian, Count of East Frisia, Ruler of East Frisia (died 1628)
- 1621 – Rutger von Ascheberg, Courland-born soldier in Swedish service (died 1693)
- 1621 – (baptized) Isaac van Ostade, Dutch painter (died 1649)
- 1638 – Henry Hyde, 2nd Earl of Clarendon (died 1709)
- 1644 – William Salmon, English medical writer (died 1713)
- 1731 – Martha Washington, First Lady of the United States (died 1802)
- 1739 – Jabez Bowen, American colonel and politician, 45th Deputy Governor of Rhode Island (died 1815)
- 1740 – Marquis de Sade, French philosopher and politician (died 1814)
- 1743 – Alessandro Cagliostro, Italian occultist and explorer (died 1795)
- 1773 – John Randolph of Roanoke, American planter and politician, 8th United States Ambassador to Russia (died 1833)
- 1774 – William Lawson, English-Australian explorer and politician (died 1850)
- 1813 – Daniel Pollen, Irish-New Zealand politician, 9th Prime Minister of New Zealand (died 1896)
- 1823 – Gédéon Ouimet, Canadian lawyer and politician, 2nd Premier of Quebec (died 1905)
- 1835 – Pope Pius X (died 1914)
- 1838 – Duchess Alexandra Petrovna of Oldenburg (died 1900)
- 1840 – Thomas Hardy, English novelist and poet (died 1928)
- 1840 – Émile Munier, French artist (died 1895)
- 1857 – Edward Elgar, English composer and educator (died 1934)
- 1857 – Karl Adolph Gjellerup, Danish author and poet, Nobel Prize laureate (died 1919)
- 1861 – Concordia Selander, Swedish actress and manager (died 1935)
- 1863 – Felix Weingartner, Croatian-Austrian pianist, composer, and conductor (died 1942)
- 1865 – George Lohmann, English cricketer (died 1901)
- 1865 – Adelaide Casely-Hayford, Sierra Leone Creole advocate and activist for cultural nationalism (died 1960)
- 1866 – Jack O'Connor, American baseball player and manager (died 1937)
- 1875 – Charles Stewart Mott, American businessman and politician, 50th Mayor of Flint, Michigan (died 1973)
- 1878 – Wallace Hartley, English violinist and bandleader (died 1912)
- 1881 – Walter Egan, American golfer (died 1971)
- 1891 – Thurman Arnold, American lawyer and judge (died 1969)
- 1891 – Takijirō Ōnishi, Japanese admiral and pilot (died 1945)
- 1893 – Maire Comerford, Irish Republican (died 1982)
- 1899 – Lotte Reiniger, German animator and director (died 1981)
- 1899 – Edwin Way Teale, American environmentalist and photographer (died 1980)

=== 1901–present ===
- 1904 – Frank Runacres, English painter and educator (died 1974)
- 1904 – Johnny Weissmuller, Hungarian-American swimmer and actor (died 1984)
- 1907 – Dorothy West, American journalist and author (died 1998)
- 1907 – John Lehmann, English poet and publisher (died 1987)
- 1910 – Hector Dyer, American sprinter (died 1990)
- 1911 – Joe McCluskey, American runner (died 2002)
- 1913 – Barbara Pym, English author (died 1980)
- 1913 – Elsie Tu, English-Hong Kong educator and politician (died 2015)
- 1915 – Alexandru Nicolschi, Romanian spy (died 1992)
- 1915 – Lester del Rey, American science fiction author (died 1993)
- 1917 – Heinz Sielmann, German photographer and director (died 2006)
- 1918 – Ruth Atkinson, Canadian-American illustrator (died 1997)
- 1918 – Kathryn Tucker Windham, American journalist and author (died 2011)
- 1920 – Frank G. Clement, American lawyer and politician, 41st Governor of Tennessee (died 1969)
- 1920 – Yolande Donlan, American-English actress (died 2014)
- 1920 – Marcel Reich-Ranicki, Polish-German author and critic (died 2013)
- 1920 – Tex Schramm, American businessman (died 2003)
- 1920 – Johnny Speight, English screenwriter and producer (died 1998)
- 1921 – Betty Freeman, American photographer and philanthropist (died 2009)
- 1921 – Ernie Royal, American trumpet player (died 1983)
- 1921 – Sigmund Sternberg, Hungarian-English businessman and philanthropist (died 2016)
- 1921 – András Szennay, Hungarian priest (died 2012)
- 1922 – Juan Antonio Bardem, Spanish director and screenwriter (died 2002)
- 1921 – Clair Patterson, American geochemist, determined age of the earth, discovered ubiquitous lead poisoning (died 1995)
- 1922 – Charlie Sifford, American professional golfer (died 2015)
- 1922 – Carmen Silvera, Canadian-English actress (died 2002)
- 1923 – Lloyd Shapley, American mathematician and economist, Nobel Prize laureate (died 2016)
- 1924 – June Callwood, Canadian journalist, author, and activist (died 2007)
- 1926 – Chiyonoyama Masanobu, Japanese sumo wrestler, the 41st Yokozuna (died 1977)
- 1926 – Milo O'Shea, Irish-American actor (died 2013)
- 1927 – W. Watts Biggers, American author, screenwriter, and animator (died 2013)
- 1927 – Colin Brittan, English footballer (died 2013)
- 1928 – Erzsi Kovács, Hungarian singer (died 2014)
- 1928 – Ron Reynolds, English footballer (died 1999)
- 1929 – Norton Juster, American architect, author, and academic (died 2021)
- 1929 – Ken McGregor, Australian tennis player (died 2007)
- 1930 – Pete Conrad, American captain, pilot, and astronaut (died 1999)
- 1933 – Sasao Gouland, governor of Chuuk State, Micronesia (died 2011)
- 1933 – Lew "Sneaky Pete" Robinson, drag racer (died 1971)
- 1935 – Carol Shields, American-Canadian novelist and short story writer (died 2003)
- 1935 – Dimitri Kitsikis, Greek poet and educator (died 2021)
- 1936 – Volodymyr Holubnychy, Ukrainian race walker (died 2021)
- 1937 – Rosalyn Higgins, English lawyer and judge
- 1937 – Sally Kellerman, American actress (died 2022)
- 1937 – Klaus-Michael Kühne, German billionaire and businessman (died 2026)
- 1937 – Jimmy Jones, American singer-songwriter (died 2012)
- 1937 – Robert Paul, Canadian figure skater and choreographer (died 2024)
- 1937 – Deric Washburn, American screenwriter and playwright
- 1938 – Kevin Brownlow, English historian and author
- 1938 – George William Penrose, Lord Penrose, Scottish lawyer and judge (died 2025)
- 1939 – Charles Miller, American musician (died 1980)
- 1939 – John Schlee, American golfer (died 2000)
- 1940 – Constantine II of Greece (died 2023)
- 1941 – Stacy Keach, American actor (died 2026)
- 1941 – Lou Nanne, Canadian-American ice hockey player and manager
- 1941 – Irène Schweizer, Swiss jazz pianist (died 2024)
- 1941 – Charlie Watts, English drummer, songwriter, and producer (died 2021)
- 1942 – Mike Ahern, Australian politician, 32nd Premier of Queensland (died 2023)
- 1943 – Ivi Eenmaa, Estonian politician, 36th Mayor of Tallinn
- 1943 – Charles Haid, American actor and director
- 1943 – Crescenzio Sepe, Italian cardinal
- 1944 – Robert Elliott, American actor (died 2004)
- 1944 – Marvin Hamlisch, American composer and conductor (died 2012)
- 1945 – Richard Long, English painter, sculptor, and photographer
- 1945 – Bonnie Newman, American businesswoman and politician
- 1946 – Lasse Hallström, Swedish director, producer, and screenwriter
- 1946 – Peter Sutcliffe, English serial killer (died 2020)
- 1948 – Jerry Mathers, American actor
- 1949 – Heather Couper, English astronomer and physicist (died 2020)
- 1949 – Frank Rich, American journalist and critic
- 1950 – Joanna Gleason, Canadian actress and singer
- 1950 – Momčilo Vukotić, Serbian footballer and manager (died 2021)
- 1951 – Gilbert Baker, American artist, gay rights activist, and designer of the rainbow flag (died 2017)
- 1951 – Arnold Mühren, Dutch footballer and manager
- 1951 – Larry Robinson, Canadian ice hockey player and coach
- 1951 – Alexander Wylie, Lord Kinclaven, Scottish lawyer, judge, and educator
- 1952 – Gary Bettman, American sports executive, 14th Commissioner of the National Hockey League
- 1953 – Vidar Johansen, Norwegian saxophonist
- 1953 – Craig Stadler, American golfer
- 1953 – Cornel West, American philosopher, author, and academic
- 1954 – Dennis Haysbert, American actor and producer
- 1955 – Dana Carvey, American comedian and actor
- 1955 – Nandan Nilekani, Indian businessman, co-founded Infosys
- 1955 – Mani Ratnam, Indian director, producer, and screenwriter
- 1955 – Michael Steele, American singer-songwriter and bass player
- 1956 – Jan Lammers, Dutch race car driver
- 1957 – Mark Lawrenson, English footballer and manager
- 1958 – Lex Luger, American wrestler and football player
- 1959 – Rineke Dijkstra, Dutch photographer
- 1959 – Lydia Lunch, American singer-songwriter, guitarist, and actress
- 1960 – Olga Bondarenko, Russian runner
- 1960 – Tony Hadley, English singer-songwriter and actor
- 1960 – Kyle Petty, American race car driver and sportscaster
- 1962 – Mark Plaatjes, South African-American runner and coach
- 1963 – Anand Abhyankar, Indian actor (died 2012)
- 1964 – Caroline Link, German director and screenwriter
- 1965 – Mark Waugh, Australian cricketer and journalist
- 1965 – Steve Waugh, Australian cricketer
- 1966 – Dayana Cadeau, Haitian born Canadian-American professional bodybuilder
- 1966 – Candace Gingrich, American activist
- 1966 – Pedro Guerra, Spanish singer-songwriter
- 1966 – Catherine King, Australian politician
- 1966 – Petra van Staveren, Dutch swimmer
- 1967 – Remigija Nazarovienė, Lithuanian heptathlete and coach
- 1967 – Mike Stanton, American baseball player
- 1967 – Nadhim Zahawi, British politician
- 1968 – Merril Bainbridge, Australian singer-songwriter
- 1968 – Andy Cohen, American television host
- 1968 – Lester Green, American comedian and actor
- 1969 – Kurt Abbott, American baseball player
- 1969 – Paulo Sérgio, Brazilian footballer
- 1969 – David Wheaton, American tennis player, radio host, and author
- 1970 – B Real, American rapper and actor
- 1971 – Kateřina Jacques, Czech translator and politician
- 1972 – Wayne Brady, American actor, comedian, game show host, and singer
- 1972 – Raúl Ibañez, American baseball player
- 1972 – Wentworth Miller, American actor and screenwriter
- 1973 – Marko Kristal, Estonian footballer and manager
- 1973 – Neifi Pérez, Dominican-American baseball player
- 1974 – Gata Kamsky, Russian-American chess player
- 1974 – Matt Serra, American mixed martial artist
- 1975 – Salvatore Scibona, American author
- 1976 – Earl Boykins, American basketball player
- 1976 – Martin Čech, Czech ice hockey player (died 2007)
- 1976 – Antônio Rodrigo Nogueira, Brazilian mixed martial artist and boxer
- 1976 – Tim Rice-Oxley, English singer-songwriter and keyboard player
- 1977 – Teet Allas, Estonian footballer
- 1977 – A.J. Styles, American wrestler
- 1977 – Zachary Quinto, American actor and producer
- 1978 – Dominic Cooper, English actor
- 1978 – Nikki Cox, American actress
- 1978 – Yi So-yeon, biotechnologist and astronaut, the first Korean in space
- 1978 – Justin Long, American actor
- 1979 – Morena Baccarin, Brazilian-American actress
- 1979 – Butterfly Boucher, Australian singer-songwriter, guitarist, and producer
- 1980 – Fabrizio Moretti, Brazilian-American drummer
- 1980 – Bobby Simmons, American basketball player
- 1980 – Richard Skuse, English rugby player
- 1980 – Abby Wambach, American soccer player and coach
- 1980 – Tomasz Wróblewski, Polish bass player and songwriter
- 1981 – Nikolay Davydenko, Russian tennis player
- 1981 – Chin-hui Tsao, Taiwanese baseball player
- 1982 – Jewel Staite, Canadian actress
- 1983 – Chris Higgins, American ice hockey player
- 1983 – Toni Livers, Swiss skier
- 1984 – Jack Afamasaga, New Zealand rugby league player
- 1984 – Feleti Mateo, Australian-Tongan rugby league player
- 1985 – Rhett Bomar, American football player
- 1985 – Miyuki Sawashiro, Japanese voice actress and singer
- 1986 – Todd Carney, Australian rugby league player
- 1987 – Clayton Bartolo, Maltese politician
- 1987 – Maryka Holtzhausen, South African netball player
- 1987 – Yoann Huget, French rugby player
- 1987 – Matthew Koma, American singer-songwriter and guitarist
- 1987 – Angelo Mathews, Sri Lankan cricketer
- 1987 – Sonakshi Sinha, Indian actress
- 1988 – Sergio Agüero, Argentine footballer
- 1988 – Awkwafina, American actress, rapper, and comedian
- 1988 – Staniliya Stamenova, Bulgarian canoeist
- 1989 – Steve Smith, Australian cricketer
- 1990 – Dane Rampe, Australian rules footballer
- 1992 – Pajtim Kasami, Swiss footballer
- 1993 – Adam Taggart, Australian footballer
- 1996 – Morissette, Filipina singer-songwriter
- 1997 – Scott Wozniak, American YouTuber
- 1999 – Campbell Graham, Australian rugby league player
- 2000 – Jay Idzes, Indonesian footballer
- 2001 – Kysaiah Pickett, Australian rules footballer
- 2002 – Madison Hu, American actress
- 2002 – Fonua Pole, New Zealand rugby league player

== Deaths ==
=== Pre-1600 ===
- 657 – Pope Eugene I
- 891 – Al-Muwaffaq, Abbasid general (born 842)
- 910 – Richilde of Provence (born 845)
- 1200 – Bishop John of Oxford
- 1258 – Peter I, Count of Urgell
- 1292 – Rhys ap Maredudd, Welsh nobleman and rebel leader
- 1418 – Katherine of Lancaster, queen of Henry III of Castile
- 1453 – Álvaro de Luna, Duke of Trujillo, Constable of Castile
- 1567 – Shane O'Neill, head of the O'Neill dynasty in Ireland (born 1530)
- 1572 – Thomas Howard, 4th Duke of Norfolk (born 1536)
- 1581 – James Douglas, 4th Earl of Morton, Scottish soldier and politician, Lord Chancellor of Scotland (born 1525)

=== 1601–1900 ===
- 1603 – Bernard of Wąbrzeźno, Roman Catholic priest (born 1575)
- 1693 – John Wildman, English soldier and politician, Postmaster General of the United Kingdom (born 1621)
- 1701 – Madeleine de Scudéry, French author (born 1607)
- 1716 – Ogata Kōrin, Japanese painter and educator (born 1658)
- 1754 – Ebenezer Erskine, Scottish minister and theologian (born 1680)
- 1761 – Jonas Alströmer, Swedish businessman (born 1685)
- 1785 – Jean Paul de Gua de Malves, French mathematician and academic (born 1713)
- 1806 – William Tate, English painter (born 1747)
- 1853 – Henry Trevor, 21st Baron Dacre, English general (born 1777)
- 1865 – Ner Middleswarth, American judge and politician (born 1783)
- 1875 – Józef Kremer, Polish psychologist, historian, and philosopher (born 1806)
- 1881 – Émile Littré, French lexicographer and philosopher (born 1801)
- 1882 – Giuseppe Garibaldi, Italian general and politician (born 1807)

=== 1901–present ===
- 1901 – George Leslie Mackay, Canadian missionary and author (born 1844)
- 1927 – Hüseyin Avni Lifij, Turkish painter (born 1886)
- 1929 – Enrique Gorostieta, Mexican general (born 1889)
- 1933 – Frank Jarvis, American runner and triple jumper (born 1878)
- 1937 – Louis Vierne, French organist and composer (born 1870)
- 1941 – Lou Gehrig, American baseball player (born 1903)
- 1942 – Bunny Berigan, American singer and trumpet player (born 1908)
- 1947 – John Gretton, 1st Baron Gretton, English sailor and politician (born 1867)
- 1948 – Viktor Brack, German physician (born 1904)
- 1948 – Karl Brandt, German SS officer (born 1904)
- 1948 – Karl Gebhardt, German physician (born 1897)
- 1948 – Waldemar Hoven, German physician (born 1903)
- 1948 – Wolfram Sievers, German SS officer (born 1905)
- 1952 – Naum Torbov, Bulgarian architect, designed the Central Sofia Market Hall (born 1880)
- 1956 – Jean Hersholt, Danish-American actor and director (born 1886)
- 1959 – Lyda Borelli, Italian actress (born 1884)
- 1961 – George S. Kaufman, American director, producer, and playwright (born 1889)
- 1962 – Vita Sackville-West, English author and poet (born 1892)
- 1967 – Benno Ohnesorg, German student and activist (born 1940)
- 1968 – André Mathieu, Canadian pianist and composer (born 1929)
- 1969 – Leo Gorcey, American actor (born 1917)
- 1970 – Orhan Kemal, Turkish author (born 1914)
- 1970 – Albert Lamorisse, French director, producer, and screenwriter (born 1922)
- 1970 – Bruce McLaren, New Zealand race car driver and engineer, founded the McLaren racing team (born 1937)
- 1970 – Giuseppe Ungaretti, Italian soldier, journalist, and academic (born 1888)
- 1970 – Lucía Sánchez Saornil, Spanish anarchist feminist (born 1895)
- 1974 – Hiroshi Kazato, Japanese race car driver (born 1949)
- 1976 – Kenneth Mason, English soldier and geographer (born 1887)
- 1976 – Juan José Torres, Bolivian general and politician, 61st President of Bolivia (born 1920)
- 1977 – Albert Bittlmayer, German footballer (born 1952)
- 1977 – Stephen Boyd, Northern Irish-born American actor (born 1931)
- 1978 – Santiago Bernabéu Yeste, Spanish footballer and coach (born 1895)
- 1979 – Jim Hutton, American actor (born 1934)
- 1982 – Fazal Ilahi Chaudhry, Pakistani lawyer and politician, 5th President of Pakistan (born 1904)
- 1982 – Shah Abdul Wahhab, Bangladeshi Islamic scholar (born 1894)
- 1983 – Stan Rogers, Canadian singer-songwriter (born 1949)
- 1983 – Ray Stehr, Australian rugby league player and coach (born 1913)
- 1986 – Aurèle Joliat, Canadian ice hockey player (born 1901)
- 1987 – Anthony de Mello, Indian-American priest and psychotherapist (born 1931)
- 1987 – Sammy Kaye, American bandleader and songwriter (born 1910)
- 1987 – Andrés Segovia, Spanish guitarist (born 1893)
- 1988 – Raj Kapoor, Indian actor, director, and producer (born 1924)
- 1989 – Ted a'Beckett, Australian cricketer and footballer (born 1907)
- 1990 – Rex Harrison, English actor (born 1908)
- 1991 – Ahmed Arif, Turkish poet and author (born 1927)
- 1992 – Philip Dunne, American director, producer, and screenwriter (born 1908)
- 1993 – Johnny Mize, American baseball player, coach, and sportscaster (born 1913)
- 1993 – Tahar Djaout, Algerian journalist, writer and poet (born 1954)
- 1994 – David Stove, Australian philosopher, author, and academic (born 1927)
- 1996 – John Alton, Hungarian-American cinematographer and director (born 1901)
- 1996 – Leon Garfield, English author (born 1921)
- 1996 – Ray Combs, American game show host (born 1956)
- 1997 – Doc Cheatham, American trumpet player, singer, and bandleader (born 1905)
- 1997 – Helen Jacobs, American tennis champion (born 1908)
- 1999 – Junior Braithwaite, Jamaican singer (born 1949)
- 2000 – Svyatoslav Fyodorov, Russian ophthalmologist, academic, and politician (born 1927)
- 2000 – John Schlee, American golfer (born 1939)
- 2000 – Gerald James Whitrow, English mathematician, cosmologist, and historian (born 1912)
- 2001 – Imogene Coca, American actress and comedian (born 1908)
- 2001 – Joey Maxim, American boxer (born 1922)
- 2002 – Hugo van Lawick, Dutch director and photographer (born 1937)
- 2003 – Freddie Blassie, American wrestler and manager (born 1918)
- 2003 – Alma Ricard, Canadian broadcaster and philanthropist (born 1906)
- 2005 – Lucien Cliche, Canadian lawyer and politician (born 1916)
- 2005 – Gunder Gundersen, Norwegian skier (born 1930)
- 2005 – Samir Kassir, Lebanese journalist and educator (born 1950)
- 2005 – Melita Norwood, English civil servant and spy (born 1912)
- 2006 – Keith Smith, English rugby player and coach (born 1952)
- 2007 – Kentarō Haneda, Japanese pianist and composer (born 1949)
- 2007 – Huang Ju, Chinese engineer and politician, 1st Vice Premier of the People's Republic of China (born 1938)
- 2008 – Bo Diddley, American singer-songwriter and guitarist (born 1928)
- 2008 – Mel Ferrer, American actor (born 1917)
- 2009 – David Eddings, American author (born 1931)
- 2012 – Adolfo Calero, Nicaraguan businessman and political activist (born 1931)
- 2012 – Richard Dawson, English-American soldier, actor, television personality, and game show host (born 1932)
- 2012 – LeRoy Ellis, American basketball player (born 1940)
- 2012 – Kathryn Joosten, American actress (born 1939)
- 2013 – Mario Bernardi, Canadian pianist and conductor (born 1930)
- 2013 – Chen Xitong, Chinese politician, 8th Mayor of Beijing (born 1930)
- 2013 – Mandawuy Yunupingu, Australian singer-songwriter and guitarist (born 1956)
- 2014 – Ivica Brzić, Serbian footballer and manager (born 1941)
- 2014 – Nikolay Khrenkov, Russian bobsledder (born 1984)
- 2014 – Alexander Shulgin, American pharmacologist and chemist (born 1925)
- 2015 – Fernando de Araújo, East Timorese politician, President of East Timor (born 1963)
- 2015 – Irwin Rose, American biologist and academic, Nobel Prize laureate (born 1926)
- 2024 – Larry Allen, American football player (born 1971)
- 2024 – Rob Burrow, English rugby league footballer (born 1982)
- 2024 – David Levy, Israeli politician (born 1937)
- 2024 – Janis Paige, American actress and singer (born 1922)

== Holidays and observances ==
- Children's Day (North Korea)
- Christian feast day:
  - Ahudemmeh (Syriac Orthodox Church)
  - Alexander (martyr)
  - Elmo
  - Felix of Nicosia
  - Marcellinus and Peter
  - Martyrs of Lyon, including Blandina
  - Pope Eugene I
  - Pothinus
  - Blessed Sadok and 48 Dominican martyrs from Sandomierz
  - June 2 (Eastern Orthodox liturgics)
- Civil Aviation Day (Azerbaijan)
- Coronation of King Jigme Singye Wangchuck, also Social Forestry Day (Bhutan)
- Day of Hristo Botev (Bulgaria)
- Decoration Day (Canada)
- Festa della Repubblica (Italy)
- Gawai Dayak, harvest festival in the state of Sarawak (Malaysia)
- International Sex Workers Day
- Telangana Day (Telangana, India)
- Alberti Day (New York City, USA)
