= Édouard Commette =

French musician (1883–1967)

- Édouard Commette at the organ of Lyon Cathedral

Background information
- Born: 12 April 1883; Lyon, France
- Died: 21 April 1967 (aged 84) Lyon, France
- Occupations: Musician, composer
- Instrument: Organ
- Labels: Columbia

Édouard Commette (12 April 1883, in Lyon – 21 April 1967) was an organist from Lyon in France of international fame who served the Archdiocese of Lyon and was organist at Basilique Notre Dame de Fourvière for over 50 years.

Place Édouard Commette at the foot of the hill on which the Basilica of Notre-Dame de Fourvière is built is named in his honour. A student of Charles-Marie Widor and Victor Neuville, his recordings were known worldwide, and he was also known as a composer of accessible and tuneful organ music in his own right.

== Biography ==
Born in Lyon in the center of the silk manufacturing district where his father was an exporter, Edouard studied piano at the lycée of Bourg-en-Bresse, after which he returned to Lyon and turned his attention to organ and harmony. A pupil of Charles Marie Widor, in 1900 he made his debut as organist in Lyon at the Church of the Good Shepherd (Église du Bon-Pasteur). Four years later he spent six months at the Church of Saint Polycarpe (Église Saint-Polycarpe), which was renowned in Lyon for its pipe organ.

He took up his post at Lyon Cathedral in 1904 and was a professor at the Conservatoire de Lyon. Among his students were Pierre-Octave Ferroud and Adrien Rougier. Called "the best French organist" by the well-known music critic Émile Vuillermoz, Commette earned similar tributes from his students and listeners from all parts of the world and is responsible for some of the earliest organ recordings. As writer David Bridgeman-Sutton notes, "These – 78s, of course – were intended for a local market: their world-wide success amazed the modest M. Commette."

== Critical reception ==
A critic from the now-defunct site Gramophone once opined, "Edouard Commette is a notable performer of the old school. He does not keep as steady a beat as I would like in the B minor and D minor Fugues, and not everyone will approve of his tendency to slow up slightly in order to point a fugal entry... I find M. Commette's rubato convincing enough in the non-fugal movements, and he gives a noble account of the B minor and Dorian preludes."

== Compositions ==
- Pieces (6) for Organ: Offertoire sur des noëls; Fughetta; Allegretto; Adoration; Aspiration religieuse; Scherzo (Bornemann, 1914)
- 14 pièces brèves pour orgue (Durand, 1926)
- Deux méditations pour orgue (Hérelle, 1947)
- Sur le lac
- Toccata in G

== Known recordings ==
- J. S. Bach on the Cathedral Organ of Saint Jean De Lyon, France. Angel Records LP, 35368.
- Orgues et organistes français du Xx° siècle (1900–1950) •

Léon Boëllmann : Menuet et Toccata de la Suite gothique Eugène Gigout : Toccata Gabriel Pierné : Prélude Felix Mendelssohn : Allegro Molto de la 6° Sonate J. S. Bach : Pièces BWV 543, 625, 614 Louis Vierne : Carillon de Longpont Louis-Nicolas Clérambault : Caprice sur les grands jeux – Lyon St-Jean – Disque EMI; Columbia, 1929, 1931, 1932, 1938 CD-EMI partiel (491)

- J. S. Bach : BWV 147, 582, 588, 578, 622, Je veux te dire adieu.

– Lyon St-Jean – Disque Columbia-FCX 498, 1955 (dq 88)

- J. S. Bach : BWV 565, 562, 542, 645, 615, Préludes mi, ut, la min.

– Lyon St-Jean – Disque Columbia-FCX 497, 1955 (dq 85)

- J. S. Bach : BWV 539, 537, 532, Chorals 605, 625, 637, 638, 727.

– Lyon St-Jean – Disque Columbia, 1956 (dq 92)

- J. S. Bach : BWV 534, 536, 546, 542, 533, 543, Chorals 614, 629.

– Lyon St-Jean – Disque Columbia, 1957 (dq 103)

- J. S. Bach : BWV 553, 554, 555, 556, 557, 558, 559, 560, 531, 547.

– Lyon St-Jean – Disque Columbia, 1958 (dq 113) (42)

- J. S. Bach : BWV 538, 566, 535, 544.

– Lyon St-Jean – Disque Columbia, 1961 (68)

- J. S. Bach : BWV 646, 651, 658, 661, 667, 669, 670, 671, 680, 734, 737.

– Lyon St-Jean – Disque Columbia, 1962 (77)

- César Franck : 3 Chorals, Pièce héroïque.

– Lyon St-Jean – Disque Columbia-FCX 496, 1955 (dq 88)

- Felix Mendelssohn : Marche nuptiale. Richard Wagner : Marche de Tannhauser.

– Transcriptions de E. Commette. – Lyon St-Jean – Disque Columbia-ESBF 176, 1957

== Scores ==
- Free scores by Édouard Commette at the International Music Score Library Project (IMSLP)
