= Serge Baudo =

French conductor

Serge Baudo (born 16 July 1927) is a French conductor, the son of the oboist Étienne Baudo. He is the nephew of the cellist Paul Tortelier.

Baudo was conductor of the Orchestra of Radio Nice from 1959 to 1962. He then served as permanent conductor at the Paris Opera from 1962 to 1965. Baudo also worked on the music of two Jacques-Yves Cousteau films: in 1964 he composed and conducted the music of World Without Sun and in 1976 he conducted some Maurice Ravel musical pieces for Voyage to the Edge of the World (a Cousteau film about a four months expedition in Antarctica). He conducted the world premieres of the operas La mère coupable by Darius Milhaud in June 1966 in Geneva as well as Andrea del Sarto by Jean-Yves Daniel-Lesur in January 1969 in Marseille . Baudo became music director of the Orchestre philharmonique Rhône-Alpes, later the Orchestre National de Lyon, in 1971, and served in this post until 1987. During his time in Lyon, he founded the Berlioz Festival, in 1979.

== Biography ==
His father Étienne Baudo (1903–2001), an oboist, was a professor at the Conservatoire de Paris from 1961 to 1973. He himself is the nephew of cellist Paul Tortelier. After studying at the Conservatoire de Paris, where he won first prize in harmony and orchestral conducting, he began his career as a percussionist with the Orchestre Lamoureux.

In 1959, he became conductor of the Nice Radio Orchestra. He also conducted the Berlin Philharmonic and the La Scala Orchestra in Milan on several occasions at the invitation of Herbert von Karajan. Il est ensuite nommé chef permanent de l'orchestre de l'Opéra de Paris (1962), puis de l'Orchestre de Paris lors de sa fondation en 1967. Entre 1971 et 1987, il est directeur artistique de Orchestre National de Lyon et l'emmène régulièrement en tournée. It was with him that this ensemble became the first French orchestra to perform in China in 1979. He created the Berlioz Festival. From 2001 to 2006, he was conductor and music director of the Prague Symphony Orchestra.

He worked as a film score composer (such as in Jacques Cousteau Le Monde sans soleil) and also adapted and conducted music for this medium (such as in Louis Malle's Les Amants, where he adapted and conducted Brahms' music, or in Jacques Cousteau Voyage au bout du monde, where he adapted and conducted Ravel's music).

He is an honorary member of the Friends of Maurice Ravel Association.

Cultural offices
Preceded by Louis Frémaux	Music Director, Orchestre National de Lyon; 1971–1987	Succeeded by Emmanuel Krivine
Preceded by Nicholas Carthy	Principal Conductor, Orchestra della Svizzera Italiana; 1997–2000	Succeeded by Alain Lombard
Preceded by Gaetano Delogu	Principal Conductor, Prague Symphony Orchestra; 2001–2006	Succeeded by Jiří Kout
