= Decoration Day (disambiguation) =

Decoration Day is the former name of Memorial Day, a United States holiday.

Decoration Day may also refer to:

- Decoration Day (tradition), a living tradition of cemetery decoration and ritual that arose by the 19th century
- Decoration Day (Canada), a Canadian holiday
- Decoration Day (album), a 2003 album by Drive-By Truckers
- Decoration Day (film), a 1990 American film based on a novel by John William Corrington
- "Decoration Day", the second movement of A Symphony: New England Holidays by Charles Ives
- "Decoration Day", a song by Sonny Boy Williamson I, later performed by John Lee Hooker on the album It Serve You Right to Suffer
