= Saint Irenaeus Church =

Multiple churches have been named after Saint Irenaeus, including:

- Saint Irenaeus Church, Lyon, a church in Lyon, France
- St. Irenaeus Catholic Church (Clinton, Iowa), a church in Clinton, Iowa
