= Adrien Rougier =

French conductor, composer and organ builder (1892–1984)

- Born: 23 June 1892; Vernaison, Rhône, France
- Died: 1 July 1984 (aged 92) Lyon, France
- Genre: Classical
- Occupations: Composer, organist
- Instrument: Organ

Adrien Rougier (23 June 1892 – 1 July 1984) was a French organist, organ builder, conductor and composer.

== Life ==
Born in Vernaison, to a family of silk merchants in Lyon, Rougier studied the piano and then the organ with Édouard Commette, organist at the Lyon Cathedral. He then continued his musical studies and learned musical composition with Georges Martin Witkowski, founder of the Société des Grands Concerts. Mobilized for military service in 1912 and during the First World War, he was wounded several times in the trenches of the Battle of Verdun before joining the Armée d'Orient and serving until the end of the war.

On his return from the front, he went back to music and entered the Schola Cantorum de Paris with Maurice Sergent, Vincent d'Indy and especially Louis Vierne as teachers, whose latter's influence would be predominant in his compositions for organ. The latter also commissioned him to create his Triptych for organ Op. 58 with orchestra. In 1921, his symphonic poem Les Elfes won the prize of the musical composition of the Société des Grands Concerts, at the same time as a Sarabande by Pierre-Octave Ferroud and the following year he became conductor of the Hector Berlioz Symphony Concerts in Grenoble. For the 1927/1928 musical season, he did not forget the Lyon scene alongside Paul Le Flem, André Caplet and Jacques Ibert by premiering En marge de trois maîtres français.

But Rougier returned to his favourite instrument, the pipe organ and, after an experience as assistant at the Church of Saint-Sulpice and as appointed organist at the Dominicains convent of the rue du Faubourg-Saint-Honoré in Paris he became a titular in several parishes in Lyon such as Saint-Irénée, Saint-Polycarpe and Saint-Pothin. Back from Paris in the 1920s, he stressed the importance and variety of the organ repertoire by Bach with his former master, Édouard Commette, who would later make reference recordings of the German master whose work was increasingly popular with the public. Titular of the great organ of the Église Saint-Pothin, he invited in particular Marcel Dupré, Pierre Cochereau, Maurice Duruflé, Gaston Litaize, Jeanne Demessieux, Jean Langlais and Marie-Claire Alain to the gallery . It was at his request that Duruflé's Requiem was first performed for solo organ with the composer at the pulpit, the first for large orchestra taking place in 1947, Salle Gaveau, in Paris.

In 1937, he was one of the members of the "Cercle du Luth". with Édouard Commette, Ennemond Trillat, Jean Bouvard, Robert de Fragny, Ferrier-Jourdain, Pierre Giriat, Marcel Paponaud, Marcel Pehu, Jean Reynaud and Victor Richer, a musical society in Lyon that disappeared during the Second World War. He also participated in the premieres of many works by contemporary artists including Jean Langlais.

For his 51-stop organ of Saint-Pothin's Church, he implemented his invention, a device for calling combinations called "Acribès". One of these combiners had been installed on the grandstand organ of the primatial Saint-Jean de Lyon when it was reinstalled in 1935-1936. This combiner is still in operation in the organ of the Saint-André church in Tarare while another copy is located at the Musée suisse de l'orgue.

A professor at the Conservatoire de Lyon, where Georges Aloy, Patrice Caire, Maurice Clerc, Paul Coueffë, Georges Guillard, Jean-Pierre Millioud, Jean-Luc Salique, Marcel Godard among others were his students as well as Madeleine Jallifier, Rougier was a tireless promoter of organ music in Lyon, which led him to create the Société des Amis de l'Orgue with Jean Bouvard, Norbert Dufourcq, Marcel Péhu and abbott François Boursier, and to devote research to the electronic combiner and organ building. His contribution to the restitution of the sounds of the organs of Johann Sebastian Bach led him to make both a biographical and technical synthesis of the works of the Leipziger Kantor. With regard to organ restoration, he called for restorations that respected as much as possible the original historical instrument. In 1974 he was elevated to the rank of chevalier of the Order of St. Gregory the Great by Alexandre Renard, bishop of Lyon.

He was the brother of astronomer and physicist Gilbert Rougier, and Octave Simon's cousin.

== Works ==
- Les Elfes, poème symphonique pour orchestre, 1921 (premiered by the Orchestre philharmonique de Grenoble, 19 April 1922)
- En marge de trois maîtres français, pour orchestre (premiered on 9 November 1928, salle Rameau à Lyon, by the orchestra of the Société philharmonique de Lyon conducted by the author).
- Trois Esquisses pour l'Odyssée: Ulysse, Calypso, Les Jeux chez les Phéaciens, for orchestra (premiered March 1934, salle Rameau in Lyon, by the orchestre de la Société philharmonique de Lyon conducted by Jean Witkowski).
- Nocturne pour violoncelle et piano (published at Jobert, Paris)
- Trois mélodies sur des poèmes d’Albert Samain, pour soprano et piano : La Maison du Matin, Le Petit Palémon, dedicated to Suzanne Balguerie and Les Constellations dedicated to her brother Gilbert Rougier, (published by Jobert, Paris, 1936)
- Prélude, extract of Suite Française, for piano, by the Members of the Luth (published at Béal, in Lyon)
- Elégie-lamento pour orgue (published by Rubin, Lyon)
- Arabesque pour orgue (published by Rubin, Lyon)
- Elevation en ré bémol majeur pour orgue (published by Rubin, Lyon)
- Interlude en ut mineur pour orgue (published by Rubin, Lyon)
- Toccata et fugue en sol mineur pour orgue, premiered in the presence of Alexandre Renard, archbishop of Lyon (published by Rubin, Lyon)
- Petites pièces pour orgue
- Berceuse pour violon et orgue
- Initiation à la facture d'orgue publication in Amis de l’orgue de Lyon - 1940/41 –
- Les Orgues de Jean-Sébastien Bach - Imprimerie Roudil Frères – Lyon
- J.-S. Bach, l'organiste et l'œuvre pour orgue by Adrien Rougier.

== Selected discography ==
- Berceuse pour violon et orgue, by Georges Guillard (choir organ) and Michel Dietz (violin), Saint-Louis-en-l'Île church in the Île Saint-Louis, Disque Orgues Nouvelles No 6, 2009.
- Toccata et fugue, by Georges Aloy, Lyon, Basilique de Fourvière, Disque Amis de l'orgue.
- Arabesque, by Patrice Caire, Lyon, chapelle des Chartreux, Lugduvox Records, 1980.
