= Primate of the Gauls =

Ecclesiastical rank among French bishops

- Primat des Gaules

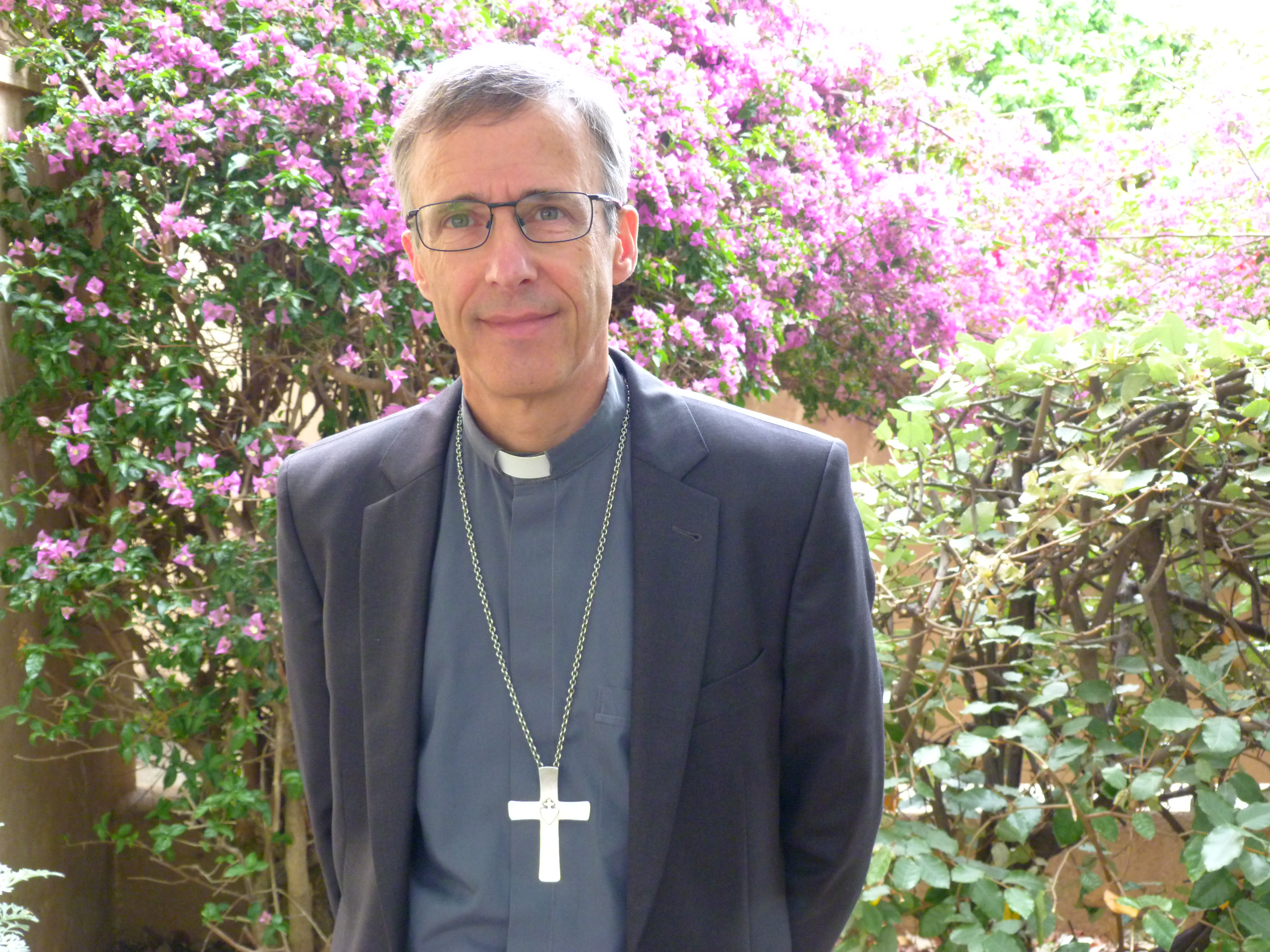
- Incumbent; Olivier de Germay since 20 december 2020
- Residence: Archdiocese of Lyon
- Appointer: The Pope
- Term length: At the Pope's pleasure
- Formation: 1079; 947 years ago
- First holder: Gébuin
- Website: https://lyon.catholique.fr/

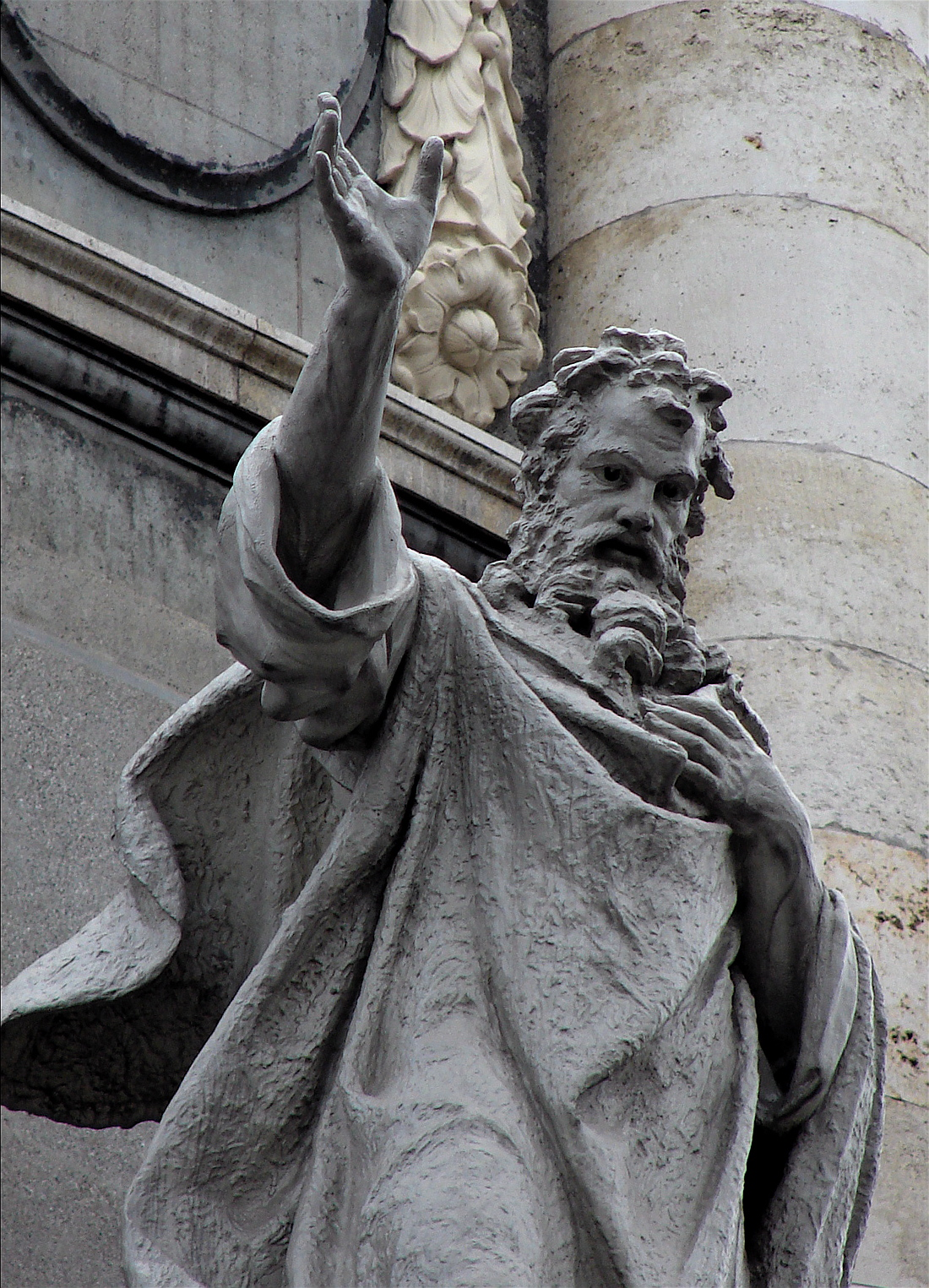
Statue of Irenaeus of Lyon, second bishop of Lyon

Primate of the Gauls is a title given since 1079 to the archbishop of Lyon, former capital of the Three Gauls then land of the Roman Empire, and has described the authority he has exercised in the past over the other bishops of France. The primacy of a title conferred on archbishop guarantees a theoretical jurisdiction over several ecclesiastical provinces. In France, only the title of Primate of the Gauls and Primate of Normandy, respectively assigned to the archbishops of Lyon and Rouen, are still used (although the honorific title of Primate of Lorraine brought by the bishop of Nancy and Toul does exist).

Currently, the primate of the Gauls is Archbishop Olivier de Germay.

== History ==
The first Christian missionary work in what is today France was centered on Lyon. A wave of persecution in Asia Minor had seen migration of Christians to the cities of Lugdunum (Lyon), and Vienne. It was here the first bishops were established there. The Bishop of Lugdunum, Saint Pothinus (c.177) and his disciple Saint Irenaeus who succeeded him were at the center of this immigration.

Irenaeus had been a student of Polycarp the disciple of John the Evangelist, and was a skilled theologian in his own right. Similarly it is probable that Pothinus of Lyon had known Polycarp, who no doubt sent the immigrants out in the first place The bishop of Lugdunum with such close ties to the disciples, a strong theological reputation and the fact that it was the oldest bishopric naturally assumed primacy in the expanding Church of Gaul. The first two bishops were known as primate of the Gauls. Thereafter the title lapsed for some centuries although the archbishops did exert some inter diocesan authority.

In 875, the primate of the Gauls function was attached to the person of the archbishop of Sens (at the time of Anségise) by Pope John VIII at the Council of Ponthion. This proposal, more political than canonical, was supported covertly by Charles the Bald, who would thus justify its political pretensions throughout the Carolingian Empire. The Archbishop of Reims, Hincmar, firmly opposed this based on canon law, and the Pope's proposal was not recognized, except by the Archbishop of Bordeaux, Frotaire, for personal interests.

Pope Gregory VII confirmed the primacy of the bishop of Lyon through a bull on April 19, 1079, after a dispute in Council of Poitiers of 1078. He writes that the Church of Lyons had enjoyed this privilege "per annorum longa curriccula". His intent was to reduce the power of the Archbishop of Sens, but the pope also limits the powers of the title itself, the holder is not a court of appeal, and he no longer holds the apostolic vicariate.

The primacy of Lyon is challenged regularly, and at the Council of Clermont of 1 December 1095, Pope Urban II again confirms the privileges of Lyon and declares that the Archbishop of Sens had to be in submission and obedience to the primate. It was only in 1516 that this dispute ended.

In 1696, the primacy of Gaul was disputed by the primate of Normandy. A lawsuit by the archbishop of Rouen, primate of Normandy, sought to reassert Normandy's supremacy and independence, after interference in Rouen by the primate of the Gauls. Completed in 1702, the trial before the court of the Kingdom of France eventually saw triumph the archbishop of Rouen, despite the legitimacy proven and demonstrated the primacy of Gaul and simply default possession. This curiosity made history as the primate of Normandy found himself the equal of the primate of the Gauls, the first being its sole jurisdiction over ecclesiastical province, the second the rest of France.
