= Jean Witkowski =

French choral conductor and conductor

Jean Witkowski (23 May 1895 – 24 May 1953), was a French choral conductor and conductor based in Lyon. Born in a musical family, he first studied with his father, Georges Martin Witkowski. He succeeded him as director of the Lyon Orchestra, which his father had founded.

== Life ==
Born in Vouziers, Witkowski moved as a child with his family to Lyon, where his father based his career at the conservatory, which he directed. His father also established what became the Lyon National Orchestra.

Witkowski studied music with his father, cello with Léonce Allard and piano with Blanche Selva. He began as a timpanist at the age of 13 in his father's orchestra, a position he held for 11 years. As a cellist, he was a member of several ensembles (Trillat Trio, Guichardon Quartet, Crinière Quartet).

Witkowski volunteered for the army during the Great War and was seriously wounded at the Battle of the Somme in 1916.

In January 1923, he made his debut as a choir conductor at the Schola Cantorum in Lyon. On 24 November 1929 he debuted as a conductor.

He participated in quartets and formed with violinist Hortense de Sampigny and pianist Ennemond Trillat the "Trillat trio"; it toured in France and abroad.

He took part in the premiere of works by such artists as Vincent d'Indy, Adrien Rougier, Florent Schmitt, and his own father, Georges Martin Witkowski. He also brought to Lyon some of the most renowned interpreters of the time: Robert Casadesus, Zino Francescatti, Jacques Thibaud, Alfred Cortot, Yves Nat, Ninon Vallin, Ginette Neveu, Ennemond Trillat, Marguerite Long, Paul Tortelier, Samson François, etc. Florent Schmitt nicknamed him "the French Casals".

When his father died in 1943, Witkowsi succeeded him as head of the Orchestre National de Lyon.

Witkowski died of pleurisy at age 54.

== Bibliography ==
- Rédaction Le Monde (27 May 1953). "Mort de Jean Witkowski". Le Monde (in French)..
- René Dumesnil (12 August 1953). "Le souvenir de Jean Witkowski". Le Monde (in French)..
