= Orchestre National de Lyon =

French orchestra

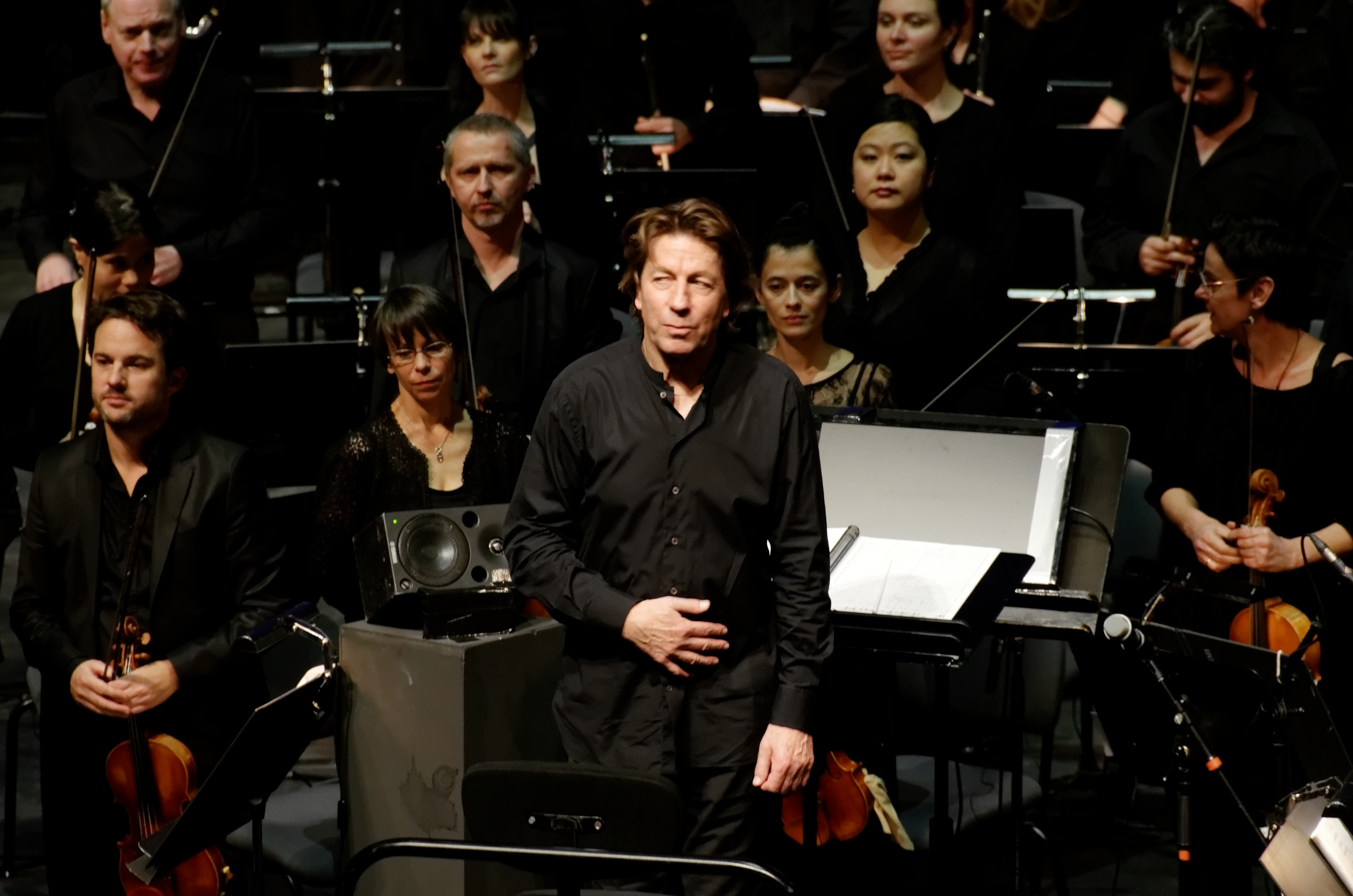
Orchestre National de Lyon

The Orchestre National de Lyon (ONL) is a French orchestra based in Lyon. Its primary concert venue is the Maurice Ravel Auditorium. The orchestra operates with the help of a subsidy from the French Ministry of Culture and from the Rhône-Alpes regional council. The current general director of the orchestra is Aline Sam-Giao.

== History ==
The orchestra's precursor was the Société des Grands Concerts de Lyon, which Georges Martin Witkowski established in 1905. Witkowski directed the society's concerts from 1905 to 1943. His son, Jean Witkowski, succeeded him from 1943 to 1953.

In 1969, the city of Lyon formally organised an orchestra for the city, with the initial name of l'Orchestre Philharmonique Rhône-Alpes. Louis Frémaux was the first music director of the orchestra, from 1969 to 1971. Serge Baudo then became music director in 1971. During his tenure, the orchestra took up residence at l'Auditorium de Lyon, in 1975. In the 1978-1979 season, Bernard Têtu formed an affiliate chorus for the ONL, which took on the name of Choeur de l'Orchestre national de Lyon with the subsequent renaming of the orchestra. In 1993, the ONL chorus was renamed the Choeurs et Solistes de Lyon-Bernard Têtu, and continues to collaborate regularly with the ONL.

In 1983, the orchestra was renamed l'Orchestre National de Lyon, its current name. Baudo concluded his tenure with the ONL in 1986. Emmanuel Krivine then served as music director from 1987 to 2000.

The American conductor David Robertson was ONL music director from 2000 to 2004, and concurrently the artistic director of l'Auditorium de Lyon, the first person to hold both posts simultaneously. Robertson conducted the ONL's first appearance at The Proms in August 2002. From 2005 to 2011, Jun Märkl was the ONL's music director. The most recent music director was Leonard Slatkin from 2011 through 2017. Slatkin now has the title of Directeur musical honoraire of the ONL.

In December 2017, Nikolaj Szeps-Znaider first guest-conducted the ONL. In December 2018, the ONL announced the appointment of Szeps-Znaider as its next music director, effective September 2020, with an initial contract of four seasons.

The orchestra has recorded for several labels, including the following:

- harmonia mundi (Baudo, music of Henri Dutilleux)
- naïve (Robertson, music of Alberto Ginastera and Steve Reich)
- Naxos (Märkl, music of Claude Debussy and Maurice Ravel; Slatkin, music of Ravel and of Saint-Saëns)
- Altus (Märkl, Beethoven Symphony No. 9 and Mahler Symphony No. 3, recorded live)

Another affiliated ensemble with the ONL is the Ensemble de Cuivres et Percussions de l'ONL (literal translation: Brass and Percussion Ensemble of the ONL), formed by tubist Christian Delange and 11 musicians of the ONL.

== Music directors ==
- Louis Frémaux (1969–1971)
- Serge Baudo (1971–1986)
- Emmanuel Krivine (1987–2000)
- David Robertson (2000–2004)
- Jun Märkl (2005–2011)
- Leonard Slatkin (2011–2017)
- Nikolai Szeps-Znaider (2020–2027)

== Composers-in-residence ==
- Michael Jarrell (1991–1993)
- Pascal Dusapin (1993–1995)
- Jean-Louis Florentz (1995–1997)
- Philippe Hersant (1998–2000)
- Thierry Escaich (2007–2010)
