= Église Saint-Pothin =

Church building in Lyon, France

Coordinates: 45°45′58″N 4°50′46″E

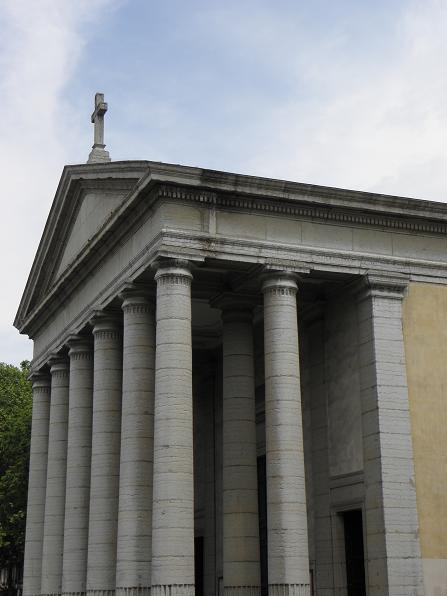
- Facade of the church

- Location within Metropole de Lyon

Religion
- Affiliation: Catholic
- District: 6th arrondissement of Lyon
- Rite: Roman Rite
- Patron: Saint Pothinus

Location
- Location: Lyon, France
- Interactive map of Église Saint-Pothin

Architecture
- Architect: Christophe Crépet
- Type: Church
- Style: Neoclassical
- Completed: 1843

Website
- saintpothin-immaculee.com

The Église Saint-Pothin (English: Church of Saint Pothinus) is a Roman Catholic church located in Lyon, France. The parish church sits on the left bank of the Rhône, in the 6th arrondissement of Lyon, at the Place Edgar Quinet. By order of 2 May 2007, the whole church was included in the supplementary inventory of monuments historiques.

== History ==
The creation of the parish of St. Pothin and the construction of the church became part of the urban development of Les Brotteaux district from the late 18th century. The progressive urbanization of the area followed a plan made by Jean-Antoine Morand (1727-1794), an architect in Lyon, and Saint-Pothin was one of the structural elements of the new plan. A chapel was opened in 1818, but Les Brotteaux district decided to create a branch of La Guillotière district placed under the patronage of St. Pothin, due to pressure from the notables and responding to the special concern of the Archbishop of Lyon. The royal ordinance of 21 June 1826 allowed this project to be materialized, thus facilitating the project of church construction and financing. The parish boundaries were established in 1827, however. Canuts smashed the doors of the old church in 1831.

In 1835, the Hospices Civils de Lyon made a gift of land and a contest was organized by the city fathers of La Guillotière. Christophe Crépet (1807-1856), Lyon architect of La Guillotière and former student of the École des Beaux-Arts de Paris, was the winner. He proposed a neoclassical style, that was partially carried out from June 1841 to 1843 as the budget, largely undervalued, was tripled. For economic reasons, this led to an adjournment of the church decoration (many statues of saints were planned, but the project was finally abandoned) and the use of inferior materials, which begat architectural disorder.

The church was opened on Christmas Day of 1843.

Architect of Lyon city Tony Desjardins in 1867, then architect Claudius Porte in 1874 and 1876-1877, directed restoration campaigns.

== Architecture ==
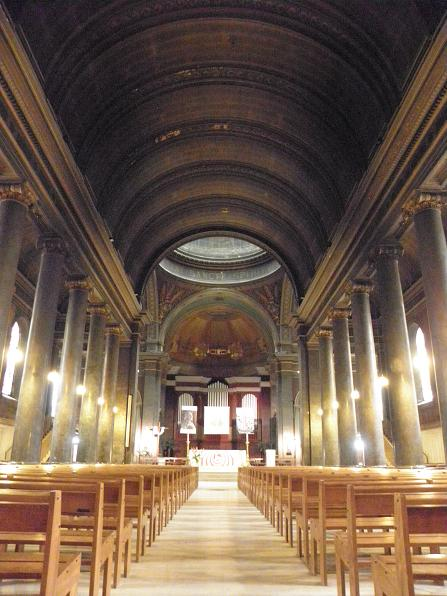
Interior of the church

This church has a neoclassical style and looks like a Greek temple. It has a Latin cross form, and its facade has a Doric portico, topped by a triangular pediment, and many Doric columns. Above the six columns of the facade, there are a frieze and a triangular pediment with a cross.

In the interior, the fresco of the dome was done in 1893-1894 by Étienne Couvert (1856-1933) and depicts the Virgin and the twelve apostles, and there is a glass made by Lucien Bégule, representing the Holy Spirit as a dove. The stained glass windows were made by Lucien Bégule's son, Émile (1880-1972), showing the founders of the Church of Lyon (St Irenaeus, St Polycarp, St Blandina and St Pothinus) and that of France (St Genevieve, St Clotilde).There is also a 1656 painting depicting St. Paul in front of the Areopagus, which was previously kept at Notre-Dame de Paris.

The organ is placed in the apse and the nave is lined aisles. Adrien Rougier was the titular organist from 1945 to 1984.

== Stained glass windows made by Bégule ==
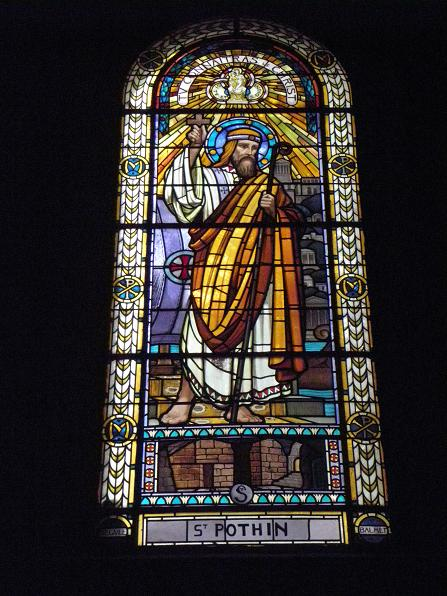
St Pothin

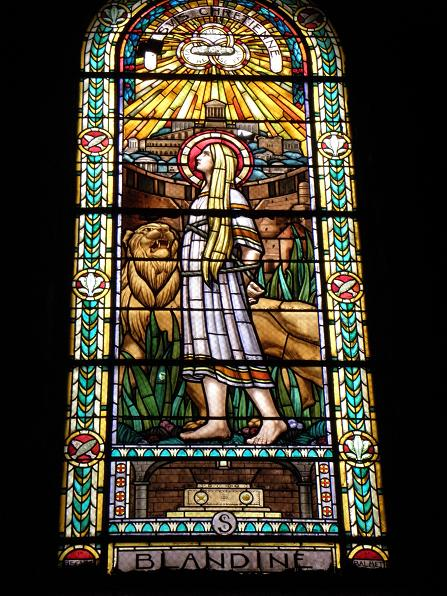
St Blandina

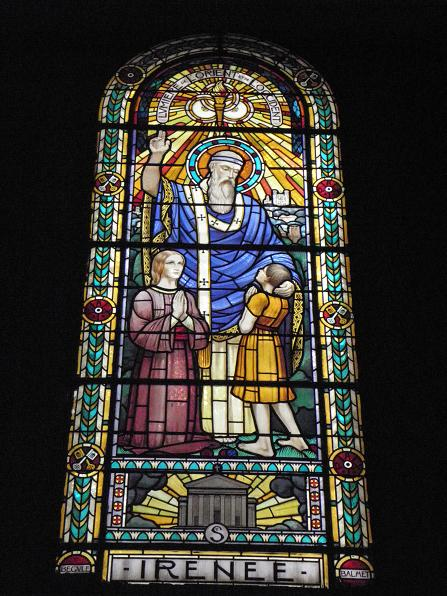
St Irenaeus

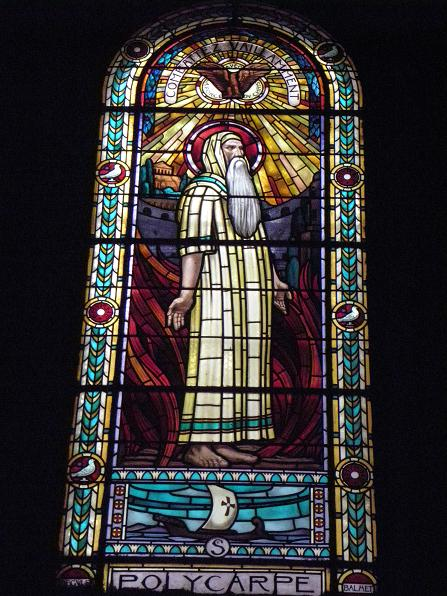
St Polycarp
