= Rue Burdeau =

Street in Lyon, France

Coordinates: 45°46′13″N 4°49′57″E

- Rue du Commerce (French)
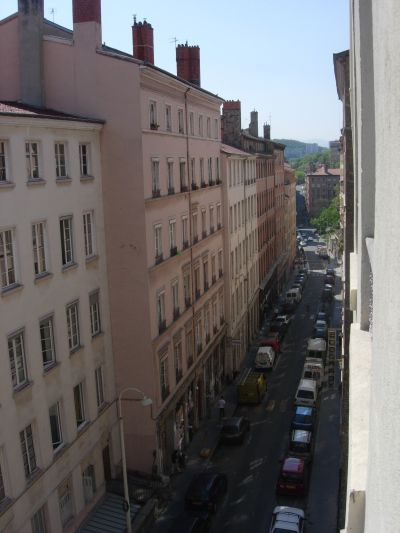
- Rue Burdeau, western side
- Interactive map of Rue Burdeau
- Type: Street
- Location: 1st arrondissement of Lyon, Lyon, France
- Postal code: 69001

Construction
- Construction start: 1810

The Rue Burdeau (French pronunciation: [ʁy byʁdo]) is a street located in the 1st arrondissement of Lyon, at the bottom of the slopes of La Croix-Rousse, just above the Église Saint-Polycarpe, between the Saône and the Rhône. It leads at one side to the Montée Saint-Sébastien and at the other to the Jardin des Plantes and crosses the Montée de la Grande Côte which renovation is completed. The street belongs to the zone classified as World Heritage Site by UNESCO.

== History ==
The site was used as gardens or vineyards from the 13th century belonging to the family Chivrier. In 1566, a wealthy Italian, Laurent Capponi bought the land and established a house then bought in 1616 by the Oratorians. The street was drawn in the late eighteenth century, pierced in 1810, extended in 1926 and first named Rue du Commerce on 18 June 1829 because it was regularly crossed by silk workers. The street then ended at the level of the Montée de la Grande Côte. In 1858, the street was extended to the Jardin des Plantes, created at the same time, and the south of the ruins of the amphitheater were destroyed. The Cour du Soleil, named after the Grolier, the 'Lords of the Sun', who owned the place from 1630 to 1688, was then incorporated into the street on 17 February 1855 and extended in 1860. Its current name was assigned by the municipal council of 8 January 1895 in honor of politician and professor of philosophy Auguste Burdeau who was born in the street in 1851. In 1848, the Club de l'Émancipation was installed at No. 12.

In 2006, the building at No. 17 was demolished for safety reasons. There used to be an active squat in this building with a lot of interesting activity. It was a plot of 285 m^{2} acquired by the city of Lyon in April 2004 for €315,000, on which were built garages and a two-floor building. It became an abandoned green space. The corresponding surface has been transformed into a concrete urban park. In October 2012, the artist JULIACKS did an intervention performance about this gated green space relating to the polemics of free space for art and culture in Lyon as part of the exhibition, CDD, at art space 360 m^{3}. The archaeological survey conducted in November 2007 had not given results leading to further excavations. The place is supposed to be the location of the federal Sanctuary of the Three Gauls, a Roman temple dedicated to Augustus.

== Architecture and associations ==
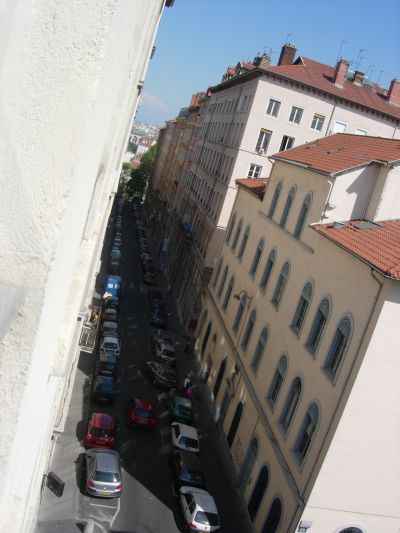
Rue Burdeau, eastern side

The street hosts several art galleries (photos, paintings, illustrations, sculptures) whose number is increasing (10 in November 2007), a theater (Espace 44), a jazz night club (Bec de Jazz). Due to this cultural wealth, the Rue Burdeau is often regarded as one of artistic and cultural centers of Lyon in which there are many art exhibitions and private viewings. There is an artistic association gathering several workshops, mainly located in the street.

The street is bordered by seven-floor canuts buildings of the early 1900s. At No. 3, there are small heads on the balconies, at 11 a courtyard with a house of golden stone, and at 40 a courtyard with a statue of the snake.

A statue of Burdeau, created by architect Gaston Trelat, is erected at the bottom of the Jardin des Plantes, just next to the street and below the Roman amphitheater. The monument was inaugurated on 28 June 1903.

== Traboules ==
There are several traboules in the street:

- No. 4, 6, 10 : These curved traboules are closed. At No. 4, a facade of the late 19th century and a traditional bourgeois home can be seen. At No. 10, there is a restored courtyard.
- No. 30 bis : This traboule has three entrances and was frequently used during French Resistance. The building probably dates from Louis XVI era. There is a courtyard paved with heads of cats, an old wall fountain, and three bridges between buildings.
- No. 36 : This blocked up traboule was also used during French Resistance. It begins with an 1840-styled building, then by a terraced courtyard with an unused fountain with a small dolphin sculpted.
