= Saint Irenaeus Church, Lyon =

Coordinates: 45.7551°N 4.8138°E

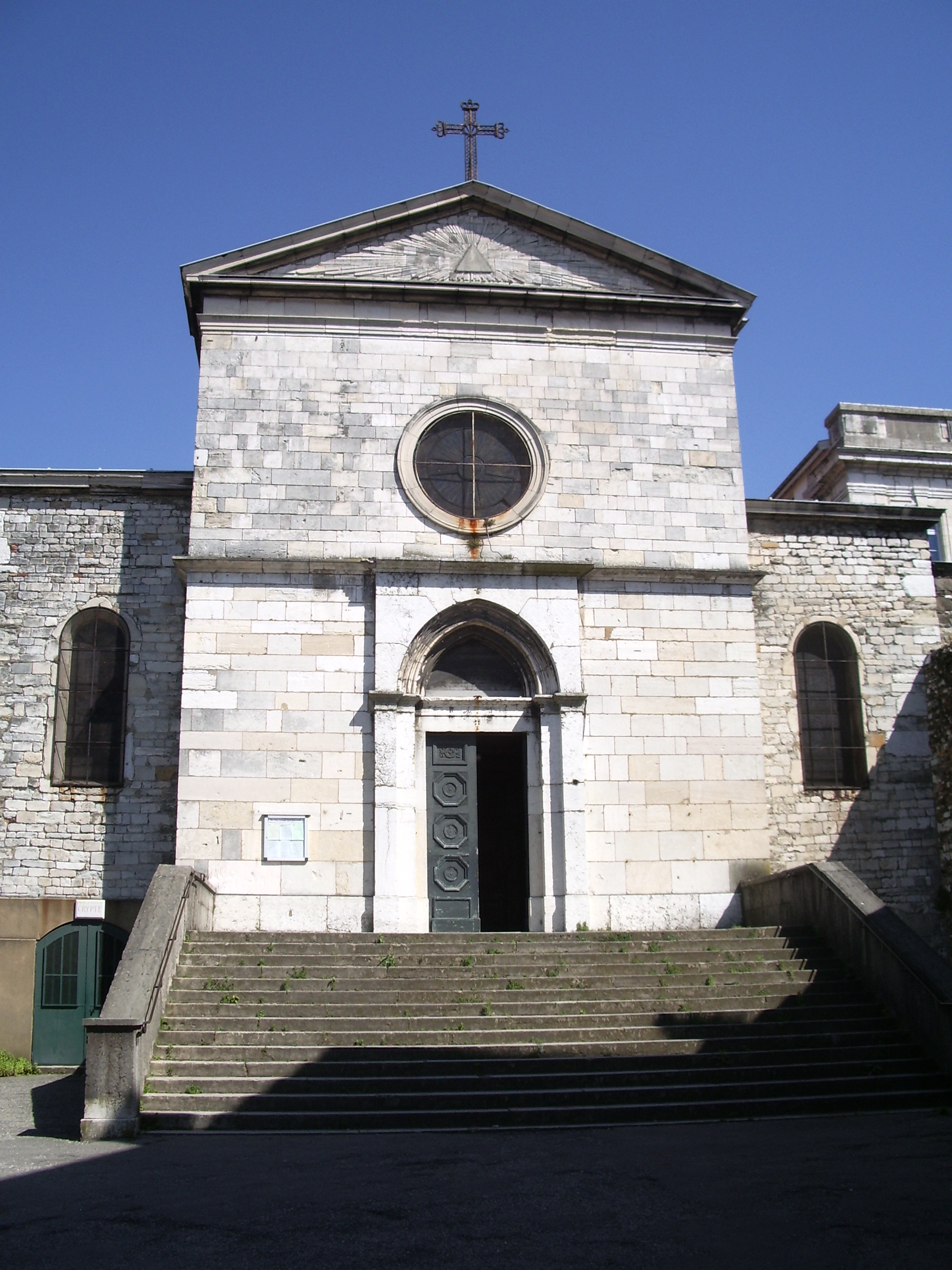
Church of St. Irenaeus

The Saint Irenaeus Church, Lyon, located on the heights of Lyon in the neighborhood of St. Irenaeus (5th arrondissement of Lyon), is one of the oldest churches in France. It is named for Irenaeus first Bishop of Lyon and Primate of Gaul.

Indeed, the crypt of the church dates from the 9th century, the beginning of the Carolingian period, while the church itself has been rebuilt, after many vicissitudes, in the early 19th century and completed in 1830. It makes the church a rare monument of the Middle Ages. The church is the subject of a classification as Monuments historiques from 1862.

Adrien Rougier was the titular organist from 1928 to 1932.
