= June 2 (Eastern Orthodox liturgics) =

Day in the Eastern Orthodox liturgical calendar

Eastern Orthodox liturgical calendar
June 1	June 2	June 3
June 2 O.S. ≍ June 15 N.S. June 2 N.S ≍ May 20 O.S.

An Eastern Orthodox cross

June 2 in Eastern Orthodox liturgical calendars is a feast day and a day of commemoration of saints and martyrs. Although some Orthodox churches use the Revised Julian Calendar and others use the traditional Julian calendar, the fixed commemorations for their respective June 2 are broadly the same, no matter which calendar is used. (Note: Despite the dates being the same, the days to which they refer typically differ by 13 days. The notation Old Style or O.S. is sometimes used to indicate a date in the traditional Julian Calendar (the "Old Calendar"). The notation New Style or N.S. indicates a date in the Revised Julian calendar (the "New Calendar").)

== Saints ==
- Hieromartyr Pothinus, Bishop of Lyon (177) (see also: July 25)
  - Martyrs Blandina and Ponticus of Lyon, and companions (177) (Note: "At Lyon, many holy martyrs (Photinus, bishop, Sanctus, deacon, Vetius, Epagathus, Maturus, Ponticus, Biblis, Attalus, Alexander and Blandina, with many others), whose many valiant combats, in the time of Marcus Aurelius Antoninus and Lucius Verus, are recorded in a letter from the church at Lyon to the churches of Asia and Phrygia. St. Blandina, one of these martyrs, though weaker on account of her sex and frame, and of her lower condition in life, encountered longer and more terrible trials. But remaining unshaken, she was put to the sword, and followed those whom she had exhorted to win the palm of martyrdom.") (Note: Photinus (or Pothinus), Sanctius (Sanctus), Vetius, Epagathus, Maturus, Ponticus, Biblis (Biblides), Attalus, Alexander, Blandina and Companions: "Martyrs in Lyon in France under Marcus Aurelius. The details of their martyrdom are given in a letter written by the Churches of Vienne and Lyon to those in Asia. The writer may have been St. Irenaeus. The martyrs were attacked by a pagan mob and later tried and condemned for their faith. Photinus, their leader, bishop of the city, an old man aged ninety, reposed in his dungeon. The others were thrown to the wild beasts in the amphitheatre at the public games.)
  - Martyr Alcibiades, at Lugdunum (Lyon) (177)
- Holy 38 martyrs, sealed inside a bath house
- Three children-martyrs and their mother, by the sword
- Venerable Erasmus of Ochrid (286-305)
- Saint Nikephoros I the Confessor, Patriarch of Constantinople (828) (Note: Name days celebrated today include Nikephoros, Nicephorus (Νικηφόρος).)
- Venerable Marinus of Constantinople, son of Saint Mary the New of Byzia (c. 930)

== Pre-Schism Western saints ==
- Hieromartyrs Marcellinus the priest, and Peter the exorcist, at Rome (304) (Note: "AT Rome, the birthday of the holy martyr Marcellinus, priest, and Peter, exorcist, who instructed in the faith many persons detained in prison. Under Diocletian, they were loaded with chains, and, after enduring many torments, were beheaded by the judge Serenus, in a place which was then called the Black Forest, but which was in their honor afterwards known as the White Forest. Their bodies were buried in a crypt near St. Tiburtius, and Pope Damasus composed for their tomb an epitaph in verse.")
- Hieromartyr Erasmus of Formia, Bishop of Formia in Campania, and 20,000 martyrs with him (303) (Note: "In Campania, during the reign of Decius, St. Erasmus, bishop and martyr, who was first scourged with leaded whips and then severely beaten with rods; he had also rosin, brimstone, lead, pitch, wax, and oil poured over him, without receiving any injury. Afterwards, under Maximian, he was again subjected to various most horrible tortures at Mola, but was still preserved from death by the power of God for the strengthening of others in the faith. Finally, celebrated for his sufferings, and called by God, he closed his life by a peaceful and holy end. His body was afterwards transferred to Gaeta.") (Note: Bishop of Formiae in Campania in Italy, martyred by disembowelment under Diocletian. His relics were transferred to Gaeta in 842 and he became the protector of sailors, hence 'St. Elmo's fire'.) (Note: "Article XII.—ST. ERASMUS, BISHOP, AND HIS COMPANIONS, MARTYRS. In the Irish Church, on the 2nd of June, was commemorated the Festival of St. Erasmus, Bishop, and of his companions, who were Martyrs, as we find recorded in the "Feilire" of St. Ængus. The Bollandists have published Acts of St. Erasmus — the authenticity of which has been suspected — and these state, that three hundred and thirty men suffered with him as Martyrs, in the city of Antioch.")
- Martyrs Cyriacus and Apollinaris, in North Africa
- Saint Eugene I, Pope of Rome, Confessor (657) (Note: A priest in Rome who acted for St. Martin during the latter's exile in the Chersonese. After St. Martin's martyrdom in 655, Eugene was chosen to succeed him. Gentle and kind to the poor, he opposed Monothelitism with courage.)
- Venerable Adalgis of Novara (Adalgis of Thiérache, Adelgis, Algis), disciple of Saint Fursey who preached around Arras and Laon in the north of France (c. 686) (Note: Born in Ireland, he was a disciple of St. Fursey and preached around Arras and Laon in the north of France. He founded a small monastery in the forest of Thiquerarche in Picardy, around which grew up the village of Saint Algis.) (Note: See: (in French) Adalgis de Thiérache. Wikipédia. (French Wikipedia).)
- Venerable Bodfan (Bobouan), patron saint of Abern in Gwynedd in Wales (7th century) (Note: He became a monk together with his father and other relations.)
- Saint Oda (Odo) the Good, Archbishop of Canterbury (958) (Note: Born in East Anglia of Danish parents, he became a monk at Fleury in France, then Bishop of Ramsbury in England and in 942 Archbishop of Canterbury. As Archbishop he played a prominent role under Kings Edmund and Edgar and paved the way for monastic restoration under Saints Dunstan, Oswald (Oda's nephew) and Ethelwold.)
- Saint Nicholas the Pilgrim (Nicholas Peregrinus), a Greek Fool-for-Christ, confessor (1094) (Note: "At Tarni, in Terra-di-Bari, St. Nicholas Peregrinus, confessor, whose miracles were related in the Roman Council, under Urban II.") (Note: A Greek Fool-for-Christ who went to the south of Italy and wandered through Apulia carrying a cross, crying 'Kyrie eleison', calling for repentance. Crowds of people, especially children, followed him repeating the same cry. He was taken for a simpleton but after his repose in Trani, aged nineteen, so many miracles took place at his tomb that he was recognised as a saint.)

== Post-Schism Orthodox saints ==
- Saint Nicephorus, Bishop of Milet (11th century)
- New Great Martyr John the New of Suceava (John of Trebizond), at Belgorod (Cetatea Alba) (1330-1340) (Note: His feast day is also celebrated on June 12. Today commemorates the miracle of the saving of the city of Suceava, Romania (where the saints' relics are kept), from the siege of the Tatars in 1622.) (Note: See: (in Romanian) Sfântul Ioan cel Nou. Wikipedia. (Romanian Wikipedia).)
- Right-believing Prince Andrew of Nizhegorod (1365)
- New Martyr Demetrius of Philadelphia (1657)
- New Martyr Constantine the former Hagarene, at Constantinople (1819)
- Martyr Leander of Epirus

== Other commemorations ==
- Icon of the Mother of God of Kiev-Bratsk (1654) (Note: The Kiev-Bratsk Icon of the Mother of God is also commemorated on September 6, May 10, and on Saturday of the Fifth Week of Great Lent.)
- Uncovering of the relics (1819) of Venerable Juliana, Princess of Vyazma, Novotorzhok (1406)
- Slaying of Monk Chariton of Holy Archangels Monastery, Kosovo (1999)

== Icon gallery ==
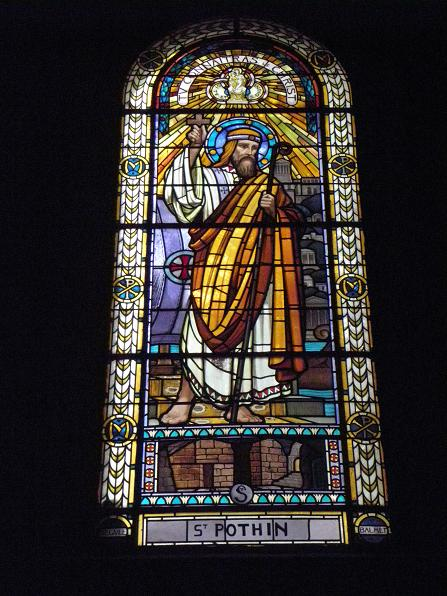
Hieromartyr Pothinus, Bishop of Lyon.

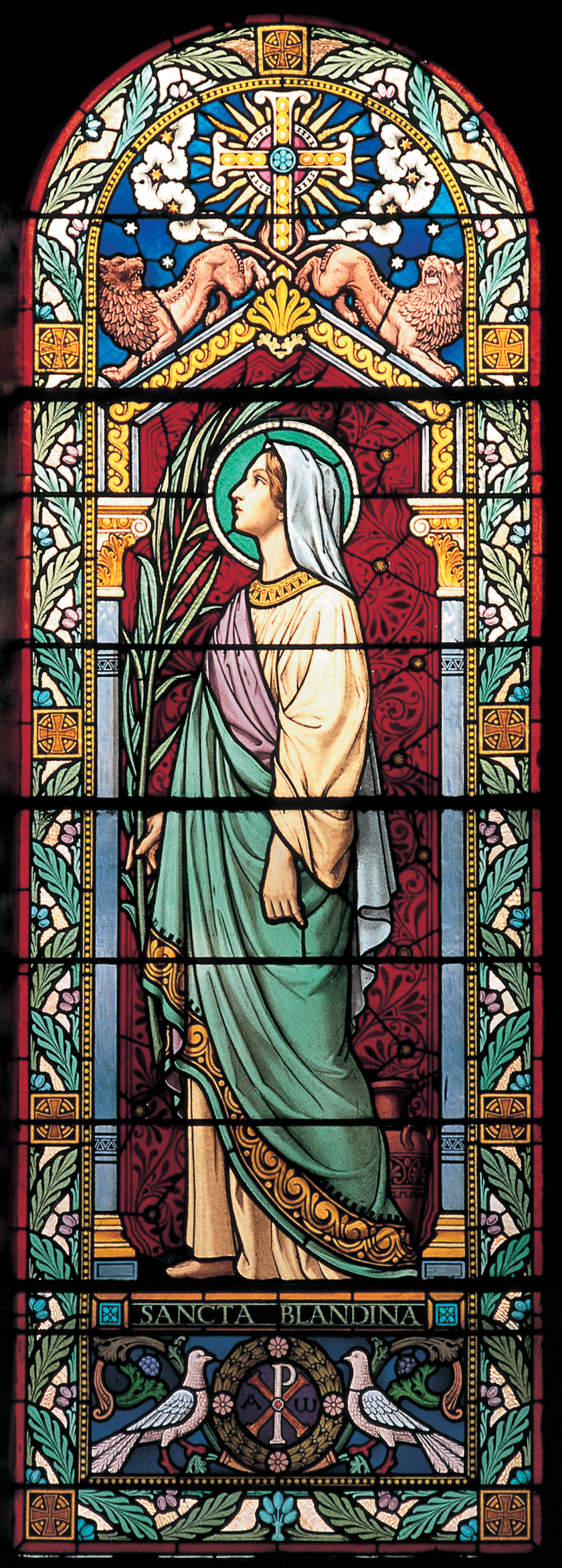
Martyr Blandina of Lyon.

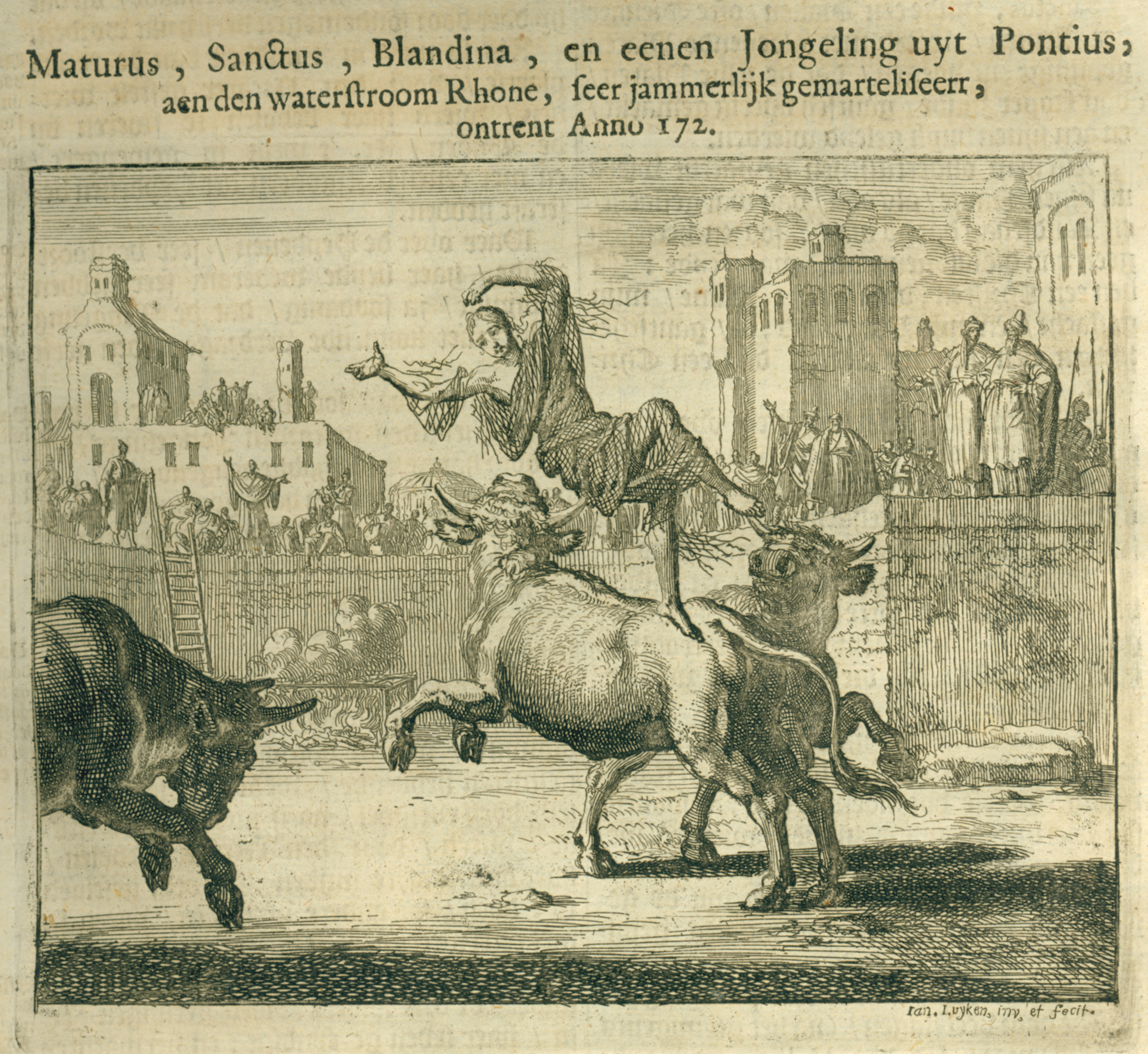
Martyr Blandina, half-roasted on a grill and then thrown to wild bulls.

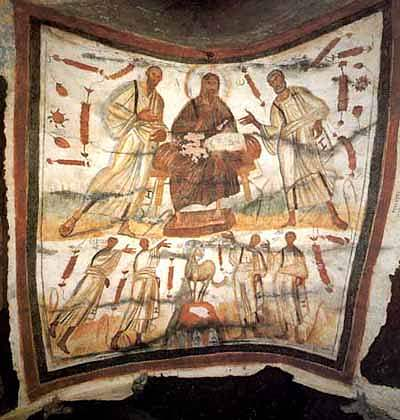
Christ between Peter and Paul, and below them the martyrs Gorgonius, Peter, Marcellinus, and Tiburtius
(4th century)

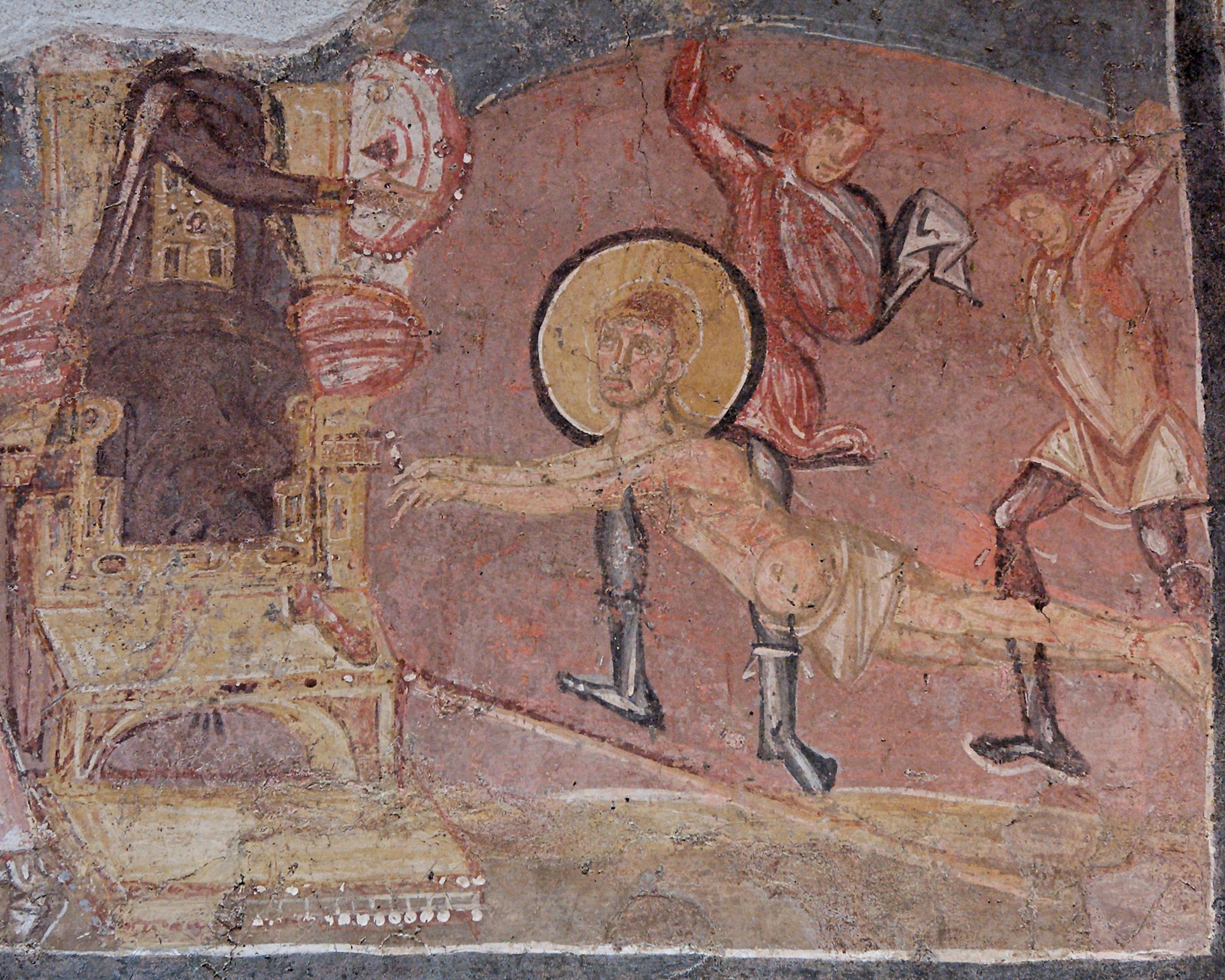
Flagellation St. Erasmus of Formia.

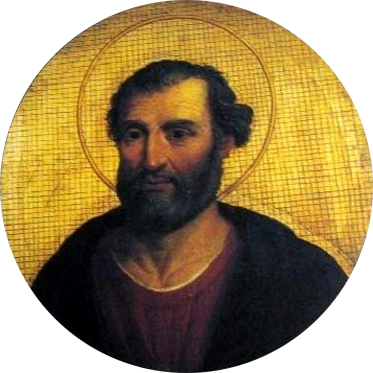
St. Eugene I, Pope of Rome, Confessor.

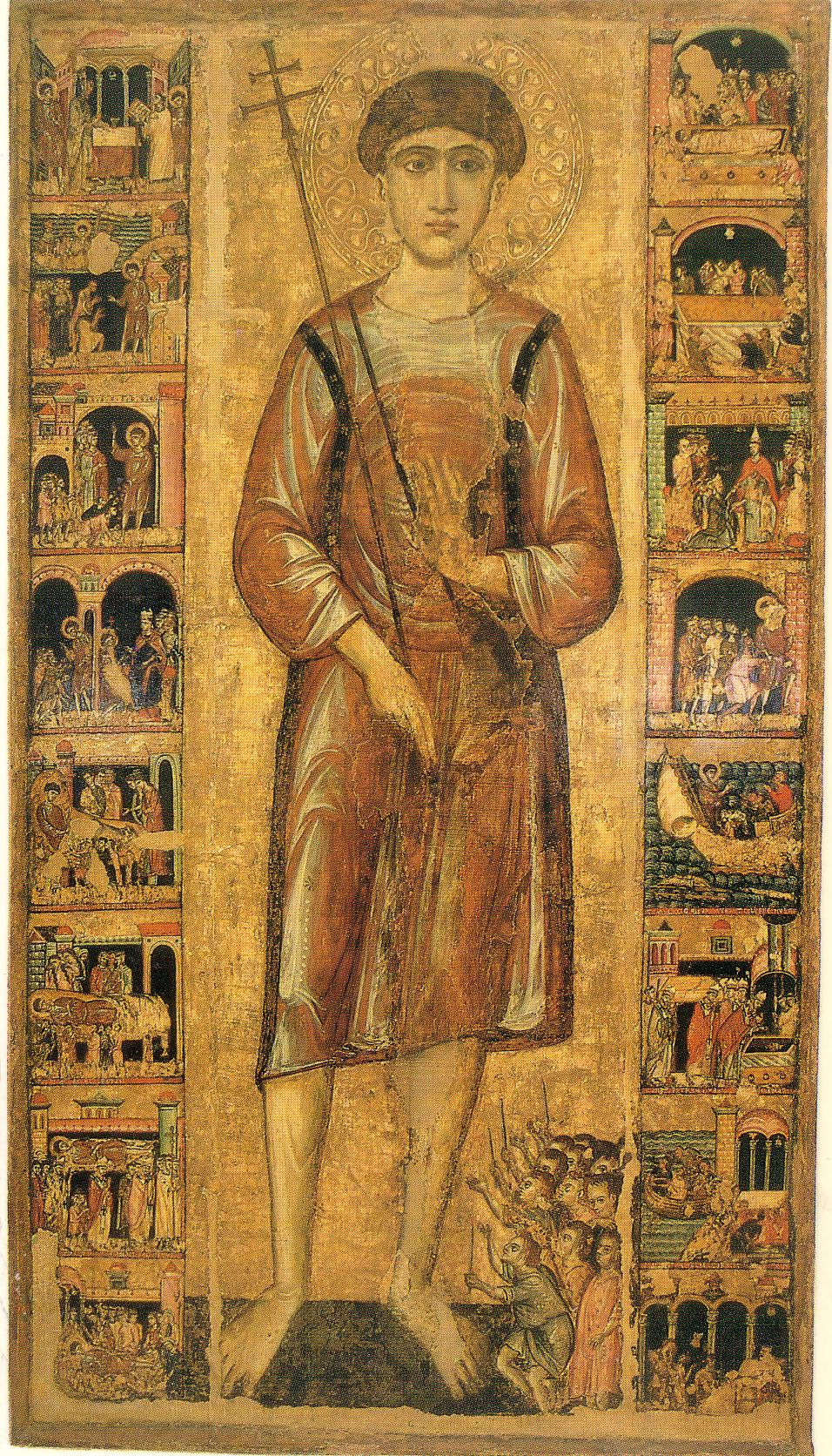
St. Nicholas the Pilgrim (Nicholas Peregrinus), a Greek Fool-for-Christ.

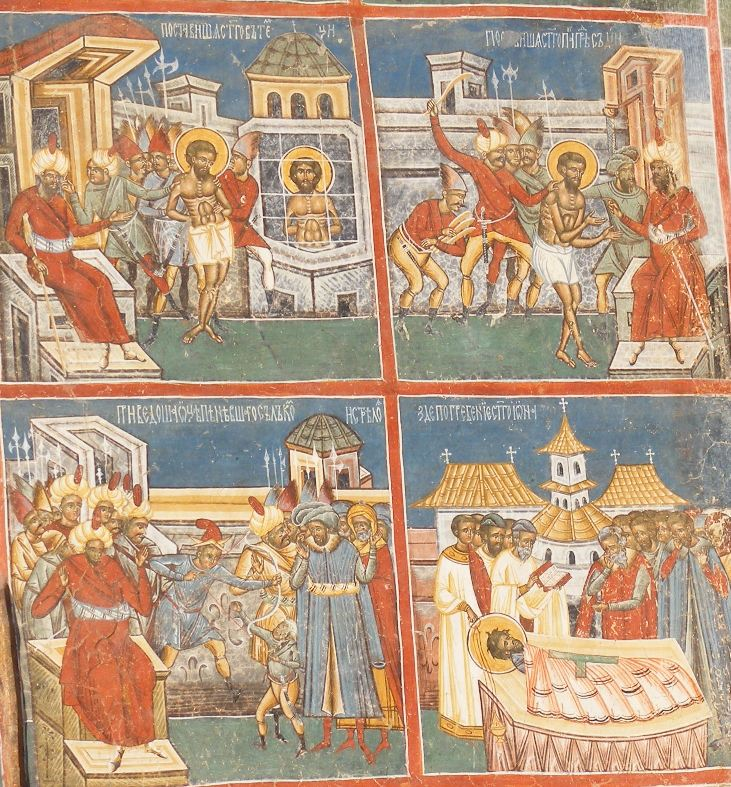
Scenes of the martyrdom St. John the New of Suceava (Voroneț Monastery).

== Sources ==
- June 2/15. Orthodox Calendar (PRAVOSLAVIE.RU).
- June 15 / June 2. HOLY TRINITY RUSSIAN ORTHODOX CHURCH (A parish of the Patriarchate of Moscow).
- June 2. OCA - The Lives of the Saints.
- The Autonomous Orthodox Metropolia of Western Europe and the Americas (ROCOR). St. Hilarion Calendar of Saints for the year of our Lord 2004. St. Hilarion Press (Austin, TX). p. 41.
- The Second Day of the Month of June. Orthodoxy in China.
- June 2. Latin Saints of the Orthodox Patriarchate of Rome.
- The Roman Martyrology. Transl. by the Archbishop of Baltimore. Last Edition, According to the Copy Printed at Rome in 1914. Revised Edition, with the Imprimatur of His Eminence Cardinal Gibbons. Baltimore: John Murphy Company, 1916. pp. 160–162.
- Rev. Richard Stanton. A Menology of England and Wales, or, Brief Memorials of the Ancient British and English Saints Arranged According to the Calendar, Together with the Martyrs of the 16th and 17th Centuries. London: Burns & Oates, 1892. pp. 251–252.

Greek Sources

- Great Synaxaristes: (in Greek) 2 ΙΟΥΝΙΟΥ. ΜΕΓΑΣ ΣΥΝΑΞΑΡΙΣΤΗΣ.
- (in Greek) Συναξαριστής. 2 Ιουνίου. ECCLESIA.GR. (H ΕΚΚΛΗΣΙΑ ΤΗΣ ΕΛΛΑΔΟΣ).
- (in Greek) June 2. Ορθόδοξος Συναξαριστής.

Russian Sources

- (in Russian) 15 июня (2 июня). Православная Энциклопедия под редакцией Патриарха Московского и всея Руси Кирилла (электронная версия). (Orthodox Encyclopedia - Pravenc.ru).
- (in Russian) 2 июня по старому стилю / 15 июня по новому стилю. Русская Православная Церковь - Православный церковный календарь на 2026 год.
- (in Russian) 2 июня (ст.ст.) 15 июня 2026 (нов. ст.). Русская Православная Церковь Отдел внешних церковных связей. (DECR).
