= Georges Martin Witkowski =

French conductor and composer

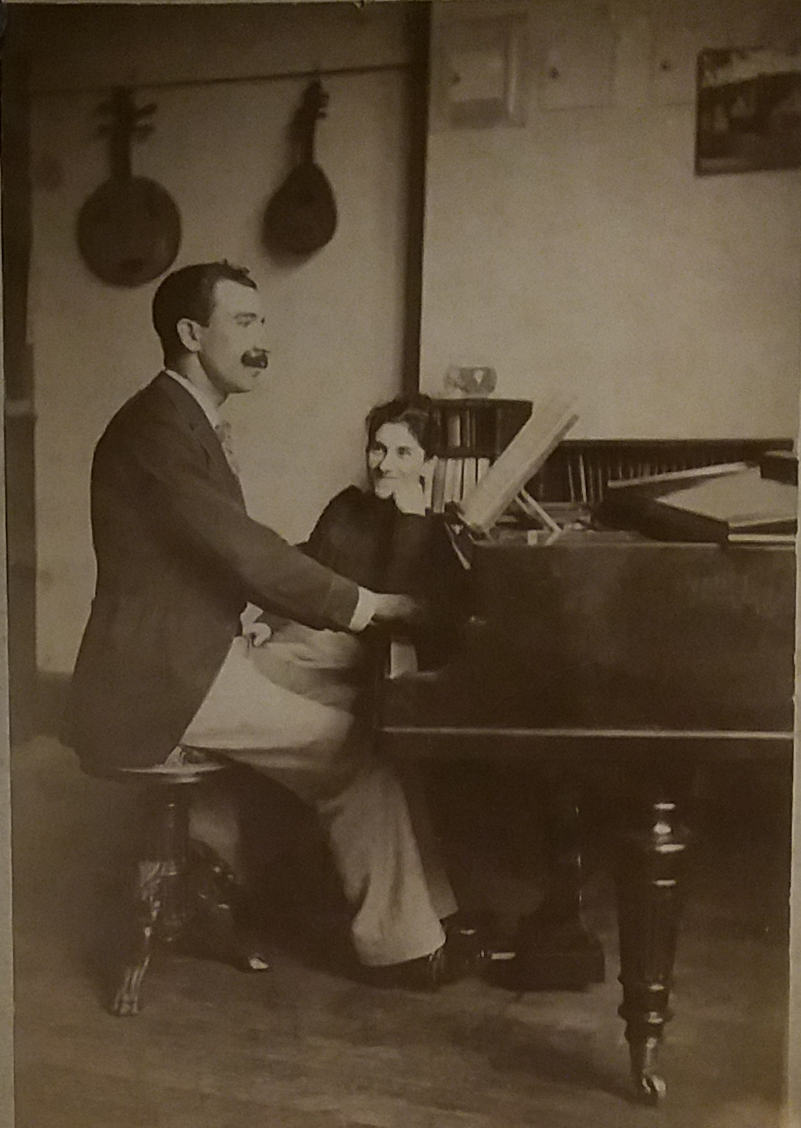
Portrait of Georges Martin Witkowski with his wife

Georges Martin Witkowski (6 January 1867 – 12 August 1943) was a French conductor and composer. Born in French Algeria, he later moved to Paris for musical studies. He became director of a conservatory in Lyon in 1924 and also established an orchestra there.

== Career ==
Born in Mostaganem, French Algeria, Witkowski started early life in the army, becoming a cavalry officer. He met noted organist Louis Vierne during that time and was encouraged to study music. He later moved to France, where he studied with Vincent d'Indy at the Schola Cantorum de Paris.

After settling in Lyon, he was appointed director of the conservatory there in 1924.

He founded the "Société des Grands Concerts" in Lyon, forerunner of the Orchestre National de Lyon. It organized hundreds of concerts and introduced to the public the works of French composers such as Pierre de Bréville, Jacques Ibert, Paul Le Flem, André Caplet, Albert Roussel, Francis Poulenc, Jean Roger-Ducasse, Henri Rabaud, Pierre-Octave Ferroud and Adrien Rougier, as well as works by foreign composers such as Igor Stravinsky, Isaac Albéniz, Sergei Prokofiev, Arthur Honegger, Ottorino Respighi, Alexandre Glazounov, etc.

He married and had a family. His son Jean Witkowski became a cellist and conductor.

Witkowski died in Lyon.

The list of Georges Martin Witkowski's compositions includes two symphonies and three operas, among other works.

== Bibliography ==
- Rollin Smith: Louis Vierne: Organist of Notre-Dame Cathedral at Google Books (Pendragon Press, 1999), ISBN 1-57647-004-0.
