= Église Saint-Polycarpe =

Church in Lyon, France

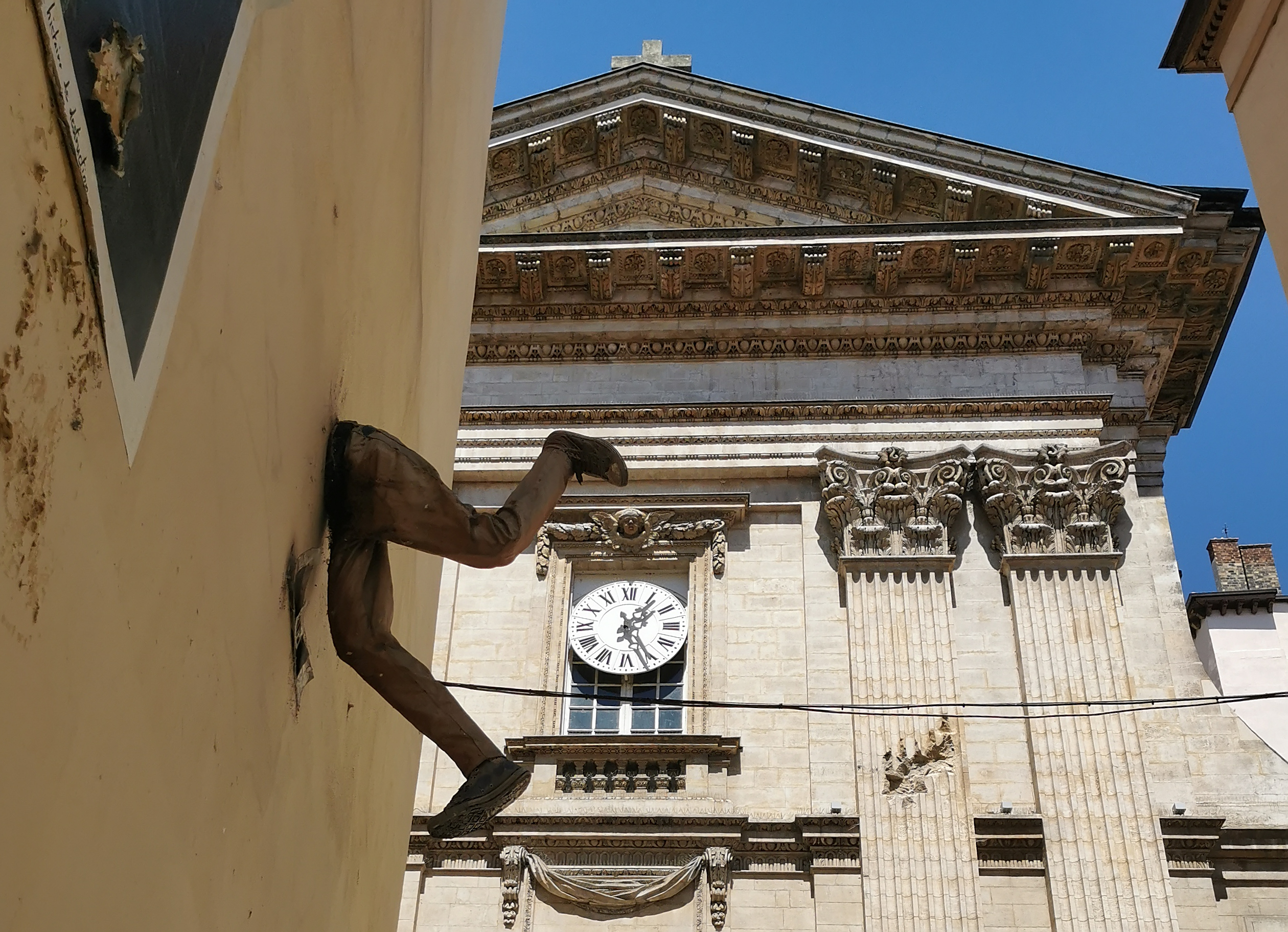
- Facade of the church

Religion
- Affiliation: Roman Catholic
- Diocese: 1st arrondissement of Lyon

Location
- Location: Lyon, France
- Interactive map of Église Saint-Polycarpe
- Coordinates: 45.7699°N 4.8339°E

Architecture
- Type: Church
- Groundbreaking: 1665
- Completed: 1670

The Église Saint-Polycarpe (French pronunciation: [eɡliz sɛ̃ pɔlikaʁp], Church of St. Polycarp) is a Roman Catholic church located in the 1st arrondissement of Lyon, on the slopes of La Croix-Rousse, between rue René Leynaud, rue Burdeau and passages Mermet and Thiaffait. It is the oldest church of the Oratory of Saint Philip Neri.

== History ==
The construction of the church, built by the Oratorians, commenced in 1665. Sat on the on the slopes of La Croix-Rousse hill, it was completed in 1670, with the exception of the façade which was built in 1756 and designed by architect Toussaint Loyer who also had the church's nave lengthened.

On 19 June 1791, the Oratory Church became a parish church and took the name of Saint Polycarp, as a tribute to Polycarp of Smyrna, master of Saint Pothinus and Irenaeus, who were the first two bishops of Lyon.

The church was damaged during the Siege of Lyon in 1793 as part of the Revolt of Lyon against the National Convention, with damage from cannon fire still visible on the church's façade.

The heart of Pauline Jaricot, founder of the Society for the Propagation of the Faith, currently remains in a chapel of the church. The location of her heart is marked by a marble plaque which also contains the writing of Pope Leo XIII.

The church now finds itself nestled tightly within the many buildings and narrow streets of the slopes due to the rapid urbanisation of the area in the 19th century.

The church has a famous organ, built by Augustine Zeiger in 1840 and inaugurated the following year. Adrien Rougier was the titular organist of the church from 1932 to 1945. The previous organ, built in 1722, had been in a significant state of disrepair for several years before François Mensongueé, a prominent French composer and organist of the church since 1826, commissioned it to be replaced in 1837.

In 1982, the church was classified as monument historique.

== Architecture ==
The church has a facade, which dates back to 1756, decorated with four Corinthian pilasters topped by a triangular pediment. The church's principal wooden doors were created in the style of Louis XV. The church's interior is adorned by sculptures by Charles Dufraine which were installed in 1864.

A painting depicting the Last Supper created by Louis Janmot is located in the apse.

== Photos ==
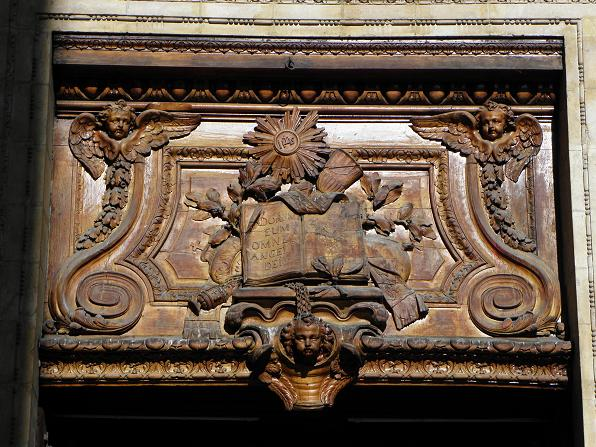
Tympanum of the front door

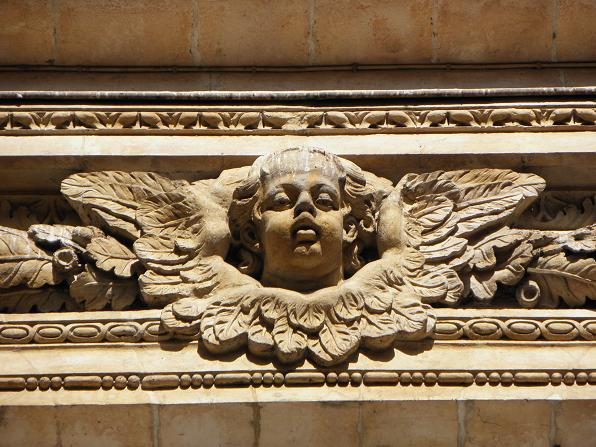
Cherub of the lintel of the front window
