= Orchestra della Svizzera Italiana =

- Orchestra
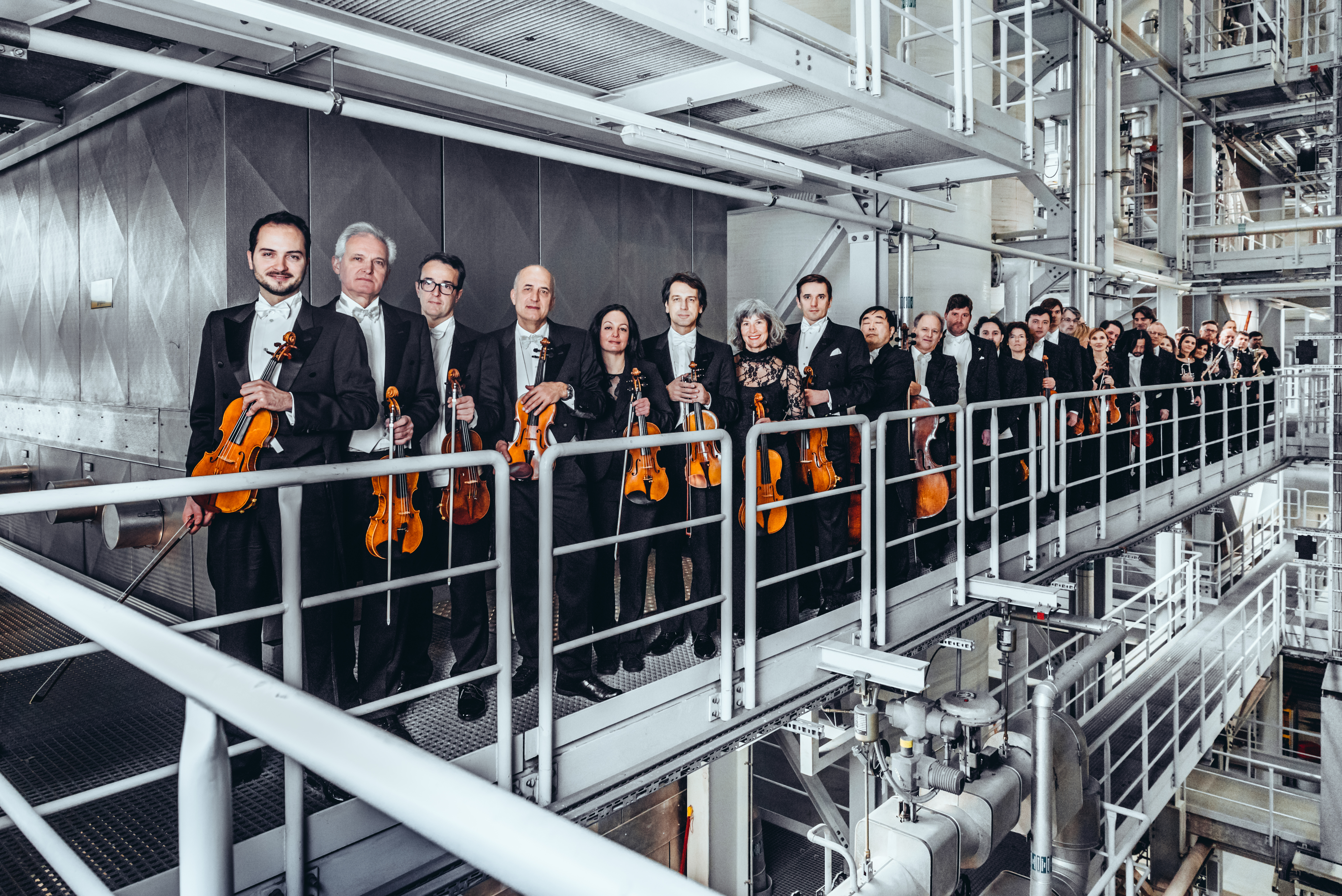
- Short name: OSI
- Former name: Orchestra della Radio Svizzera Italiana (1935); Orchestra della Radiotelevisione della Svizzera Italiana
- Founded: 1933; 93 years ago
- Location: Lugano, Switzerland
- Principal conductor: Markus Poschner
- Website: Official website

The Orchestra della Svizzera Italiana (OSI; literal translation, Orchestra of Italian Switzerland) is a Swiss orchestra based in Lugano. The orchestra's primary concert venue is the Auditorio RSI. The OSI also gives a concert series at the Sala Teatro.

== History ==
The precursor ensemble of the OSI, consisting of approximately 30 musicians, was founded in 1933 under the auspices of the Italian Swiss Radio. In 1935, the orchestra acquired the name Orchestra della Radio Svizzera Italiana, giving its first concert on 2 January 1935. Later, with the advent of television, the orchestra's name evolved to Orchestra della Radiotelevisione della Svizzera Italiana (Radio Television Orchestra of Italian Switzerland). The orchestra took on its current name in 1991.

For the orchestra, Richard Strauss composed his Duet-Concertino in F major, TrV 293 (o.op.AV 147). Other composers who directed their compositions with the OSI included Ermanno Wolf-Ferrari, Frank Martin, Paul Hindemith, Luciano Berio, Darius Milhaud, Hans Werner Henze and Igor Stravinsky. The orchestra has participated in the Settimane Musicali in Ascona (since 1946), the Concerti of Lugano (from 1953 to 1976) and the Primavera Concertistica of Lugano (since 1982).

Leopoldo Casella was the first principal conductor of the orchestra, beginning his affiliation with the ensemble back to the precursor ensemble in 1933. Casella continued to work with the orchestra until 1968. Alain Lombard, principal conductor from 1999 to 2005, subsequently held the title of honorary conductor of the orchestra. Principal guest conductors have included Serge Baudo (1997–2000) and Mikhail Pletnev (2008–2010). Vladimir Ashkenazy held the title of direttore ospite principale of the orchestra from 2013 until his retirement in 2020.

The orchestra's current principal conductor is Markus Poschner, since the 2015–2016 season.

== Principal conductors ==
- Leopoldo Casella (1933–1938)
- Otmar Nussio (1938–1968)
- Marc Andreae (1969–1991)
- Nicholas Carthy (1993–1996)
- Alain Lombard (1999–2005)
- Markus Poschner (2015–present)
