= Alexander (martyr) =

French Roman Catholic saint

Saint Alexander

Martyr and Physician
- Died: 177; Lyons
- Venerated in: Roman Catholic Church, Eastern Orthodox Church
- Canonized: pre-congregation
- Feast: 2 June

Saint Alexander was a martyr and companion of Saint Pothinus. Alexander was a physician in Vienne, Gaul, when he converted to Christianity. He was arrested during the persecutions conducted under Emperor Marcus Aurelius. Along with Pothinus and forty-six other Christians, Alexander was tortured and executed. As part of this group, Alexander is one of the Martyrs of Lyons and Vienne.
