= Nicholas Carthy =

- Born: 1957
- Origin: Bedford Modern School
- Occupations: Conductor

Nicholas Carthy (born 1957) was a Principal Conductor of the Orchestra della Svizzera Italiana (1993–96), is Professor of Music and Opera Music Director at the University of Colorado, and is visiting tutor at the Royal Northern College of Music.

== Early life ==
Nicholas Carthy was born in England in 1957. He was educated at Bedford Modern School, the Guildhall School of Music and Drama in London, and in 1981 won a scholarship to study at the Mozarteum University of Salzburg.

== Career ==
Carthy was appointed Kapellmeister at the Landestheater in Salzburg where he made his operatic debut conducting Mozart's Marriage of Figaro. He was involved as an assistant at the Salzburg Festival and worked closely with Bernard Haitink and Sir Georg Solti.

Carthy worked as an assistant to Daniel Barenboim (1990–93), with whom he was involved in a recording of Mozart's Don Giovanni in Berlin, at the Chicago Symphony Orchestra for a series of Mozart productions, and in Le Châtelet, Paris, for a performance of Wozzeck.

Carthy was appointed Music Director at the Orchestra della Svizzera Italiana in 1992. Under his stewardship, the orchestra performed at the Lucerne Festival, at the Concertgebouw, and at the Musikverein in Vienna. Carthy has conducted opera productions in Vienna, Salzburg, Oslo, Stockholm, Winterthur, Milan, Rome, Naples, Eugene, and Tel Aviv.

Carthy conducted the first performances of Thomas Adès' Powder Her Face in Sweden, Israel, Switzerland and Italy. A critical review in Opera magazine described the first performance in Italy as being "conducted with brilliant musicality."

As a guest conductor Carthy has worked with orchestras such as the Camerata Salzburg, Mozarteum Orchestra Salzburg, Royal Stockholm Philharmonic Orchestra, Colorado Symphony, Teatro di San Carlo, Accademia Filarmonica Roma, Orchestra Teatro Reggio Torino, Orchestra Sinfonica del Piemonte, L'Orchestra Filarmonica di Torino, Orchestra di Padua e del Veneto, Pomeriggi Musicale di Milano, Wiener Volksopernorchester, Israel Contemporary Players, Stadtorchester Winterthur, Royal Symphony Orchestra Prague, Slovak Philharmonic, Slovenian Philharmonic, Orquesta de San Sebastian and the Orchestra dell'Accademia Nazionale di Santa Cecilia di Roma, where he collaborated closely with Luciano Berio on several projects. He has worked with distinguished soloists including Radu Lupu, Alicia de Larrocha, Natalia Gutman, Viktoria Mullova, Waltraud Meier, Robert Dean Smith and Wolfgang Holzmair.

Carthy was a guest professor at the opera school in Stockholm (1996-2002) and is musical director of the Portland State University Summer Program. He is Professor of Music and Opera Music Director at the University of Colorado and visiting tutor at the Royal Northern College of Music.
