= Emmanuel Krivine =

French conductor (born 1947)

Emmanuel Krivine.
- Born: May 7, 1947 (age 79)
- Occupation: French Conductor.

Emmanuel Krivine (born 7 May 1947, Grenoble) is a French conductor.

== Biography ==
The son of a Polish mother and a Russian father, Krivine studied the violin as a youth. He was a winner of the Premier Prix at the Paris Conservatoire, at age 16. He later studied at the Queen Elisabeth Music Chapel in Brussels. He stopped playing the violin after a car accident in 1981.

Inspired by a meeting with Karl Böhm, Krivine began to develop an interest in conducting. He was principal guest conductor of the Orchestre Philharmonique de Radio France from 1976 to 1983. From 1987 to 2000, he was music director of the Orchestre National de Lyon. He has also served as music director of the Orchestre Français des Jeunes for 11 years.

In 2004, Krivine established the orchestra La Chambre Philharmonique. In 2006, he became music director of the Luxembourg Philharmonic Orchestra (OPL), with an initial contract of 3 years, after becoming the orchestra's principal guest conductor in 2002. In May 2009, Krivine extended his contract with the orchestra through the 2014-2015 season. He concluded his tenure as the OPL's music director at the end of the 2014-2015 season. In 2013, he became principal guest conductor of the Barcelona Symphony and Catalonia National Orchestra, with a contract through the 2015-2016 season. In May 2014, Krivine was named the next principal guest conductor of the Scottish Chamber Orchestra, effective September 2015, for an initial period of 4 years.

In June 2016, the Orchestre National de France (ONF) announced the appointment of Krivine as its next music director, effective with the 2017-2018 season, with an initial contract of 3 years. He held the title of ONF music director-designate (directeur musical désigné) for the 2016-2017 season. In November 2019, the ONF announced the scheduled conclusion of his ONF tenure at the close of the 2020-2021 season. In May 2020, Krivine resigned from his ONF post with immediate effect, one year ahead of his originally scheduled departure.

Krivine has conducted recordings for the Deutsche Grammophon, Warner Classics, Timpani, and Naive labels.

Cultural offices
Preceded by Serge Baudo	Music Director, Orchestre National de Lyon; 1987–2000	Succeeded by David Robertson
Preceded by (no predecessor)	Principal Conductor, La Chambre Philharmonique; 2004–present	Succeeded by incumbent
Preceded by Bramwell Tovey	Music Director, Luxembourg Philharmonic Orchestra; 2006–2015	Succeeded by Gustavo Gimeno
