= Pierre-Octave Ferroud =

French composer (1900–1936)

Pierre-Octave Calixte Ferroud (6 January 1900 – 17 August 1936) was a French composer of classical music.

== Life ==
Ferroud was born in Chasselay, Rhône, near Lyon. He went to Lyon, to Strasbourg (for military service from 1920 to 1922) where he studied with Guy Ropartz, and again to Lyon where he was for a time an associate and "disciple" of Florent Schmitt, and a pupil of Georges Martin Witkowski. He then travelled to Paris in 1923, settling as a composer and music critic. In 1932, together with Henry Barraud, Jean Rivier and Emmanuel Bondeville, he founded Triton, a contemporary music society.

In a letter to Boris Asafiev, Sergei Prokofiev described his encounter with Ferroud, praised the Symphony in A and suggested that Asafiev might have a look at it. Ferroud's opera, he reported, impressed him much less.

He wrote a biographical work about his mentor Florent Schmitt (whom he was, nevertheless, to pre-decease – Schmitt died 31 years after Autour de Florent Schmitt was published, in 1958.)

Ferroud was a regular contributor of musical reviews and essays to the journal Paris-Soir.

He died in 1936, when he was decapitated in a road accident in Debrecen, in Hungary. On hearing of Ferroud's death, Francis Poulenc wrote to Georges Auric of his distress.

== Selected compositions ==
- Andante cordial (1919/26)
- Types (Vieux Beau - Bourgeoise de qualité - Businessman)(1922-1924) (recorded by Emmanuel Krivine and the Orchestre National de Lyon)
- Foules (1922-1924) (recorded by Krivine)
- Sérénade (piano and orchestra) (1927)
- Chirugie 1927 (opéra comique)
- Jeunesse (1929-1933) (ballet in two scenes)
- Chansons de Fous
- Sonnerie pour le Hérault (1935)
- Le Porcher (1924) (ballet)
- March for L'éventail de Jeanne (collaborative work by Auric, Ferroud and others) (1927) (ballet)
- Monte-Carlo (1928)
- Sérénade pour orchestre (1927) (Berceuse; Pavane; Spiritual)
- Symphonie en la (1930) in three movements (recorded by Krivine)
- Chirurgie vers. orchestrale (1930)(recorded by Krivine)
- Trois pièces pour flûte seule (1920-1921)
- Spiritual (guitar) (1926)
- Sonate pour violon et piano (1929)
- Sonate el la mineur pour violoncelle et piano (1930)
- Trio à vent en mi (1933)
- Quatuor à cordes (1932-1936)
- Sarabande (1920/1926)
- Au parc Monceau (1921-1925)
- Sarabande pour piano (1920)
- Sarabande pour orchestre (1920-1926)
- Sonatine en ut dièse (in C♯) (1928)
- Fables (1931)
- A contre-cœur (1922-1925)
- Cinq poèmes de P.J. Toulet (1927)
- Cinq poèmes de P. Valéry (1929)
- Trois chansons de J. Supervielle (1932)
- Trois poèmes intimes de Goethe (1932)
