= Decoration Day (Canada) =

Holiday commemorating veterans

- Observed by: Canada
- Type: Federal holiday (formerly); Locally recognized holiday
- Date: June 2

Decoration Day is a Canadian holiday that recognizes veterans of Canada's military. The holiday has mostly been eclipsed by the similar Remembrance Day.

Decoration Day began on 2 June 1890. Originally, the celebration served as a form of protest for veterans of the Battle of Ridgeway who felt that their contributions to the protection of Canada during the Fenian Raids were being overlooked by the government. The veterans placed decorations at the Canadian Volunteers Monument near Queen's Park in Toronto on the anniversary of the battle. There were thirty thousand participants in 1891, the 25th anniversary of the Battle of Ridgeway, and up to fifty thousand watched the accompanying parade. This became an annual event, taking place on the weekend nearest the original date and accumulating more participants as further conflicts resulted in a larger body of Canadian veterans. Participants included veterans of the Fenian Raids, the North-West Rebellion, the Second Boer War, and the First World War.

The actions of the Fenian veterans resulted in the British creation of service medals recognizing participants in the pre-First World War Canadian conflicts. Canada provided compensation to veterans of the rebellions, but not the Fenian raids; Ontario did provide some recognition at the provincial level. Commemoration of Decoration Day became less prominent in the early 1900s, although it returned to some prominence when the First World War began. A Ridgeway monument was created in 1916 and made a National Historic Battlefield in 1921. In 1931, the Parliament of Canada fixed 11 November (Remembrance Day) as the official day commemorating military service in Canada. However, some recognition of Decoration Day persists.

== See also ==
- Remembrance Day
- Armistice Day
