= Saint Pothinus =

2nd century French bishop and saint

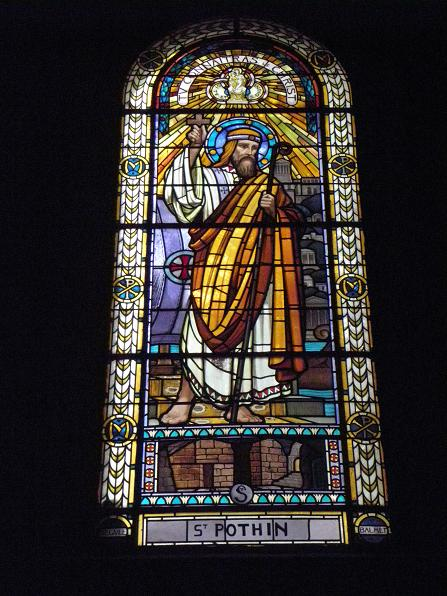
- Stained glass window depicting Pothinus in Église Saint-Pothin, Lyon

Martyr and Bishop
- Born: c. 87 AD
- Died: c. 177 AD (aged c. 90); Lyon, Gaul
- Venerated in: Roman Catholic Church; Eastern Orthodox Church
- Canonized: Pre-congregation
- Feast: 2 June

Saint Pothinus (French: Saint Pothin; c. 87 – c. 177) was the first bishop of Lyon and the first bishop of Gaul. He is first mentioned in a letter attributed to Irenaeus of Lyon. The letter was sent from the Christian communities of Lyon and Vienne to the Roman province of Asia.

== History ==
According to Irenaeus, Pothinus was born around the year 87, probably at Smyrna. He was a disciple of Polycarp, bishop of Smyrna, and accompanied him to Rome in 158.

Pope Anicetus sent him to evangelize the Gauls. Pothinus established himself at Lyon, and founded there a flourishing Church, over which he presided for almost twenty years. In asserting his own authority as bishop of Lyon, Irenaeus says that Pothinus had been his predecessor in the position, and the first holder of that office.

By 177, a large number of the Christians in the area of Vienne and Lyon were Greeks from Asia. A violent persecution was there against them while Pothinus was bishop of Lyon, and Irenæus, who had been sent there by Polycarp out of Asia, was a priest of that city.

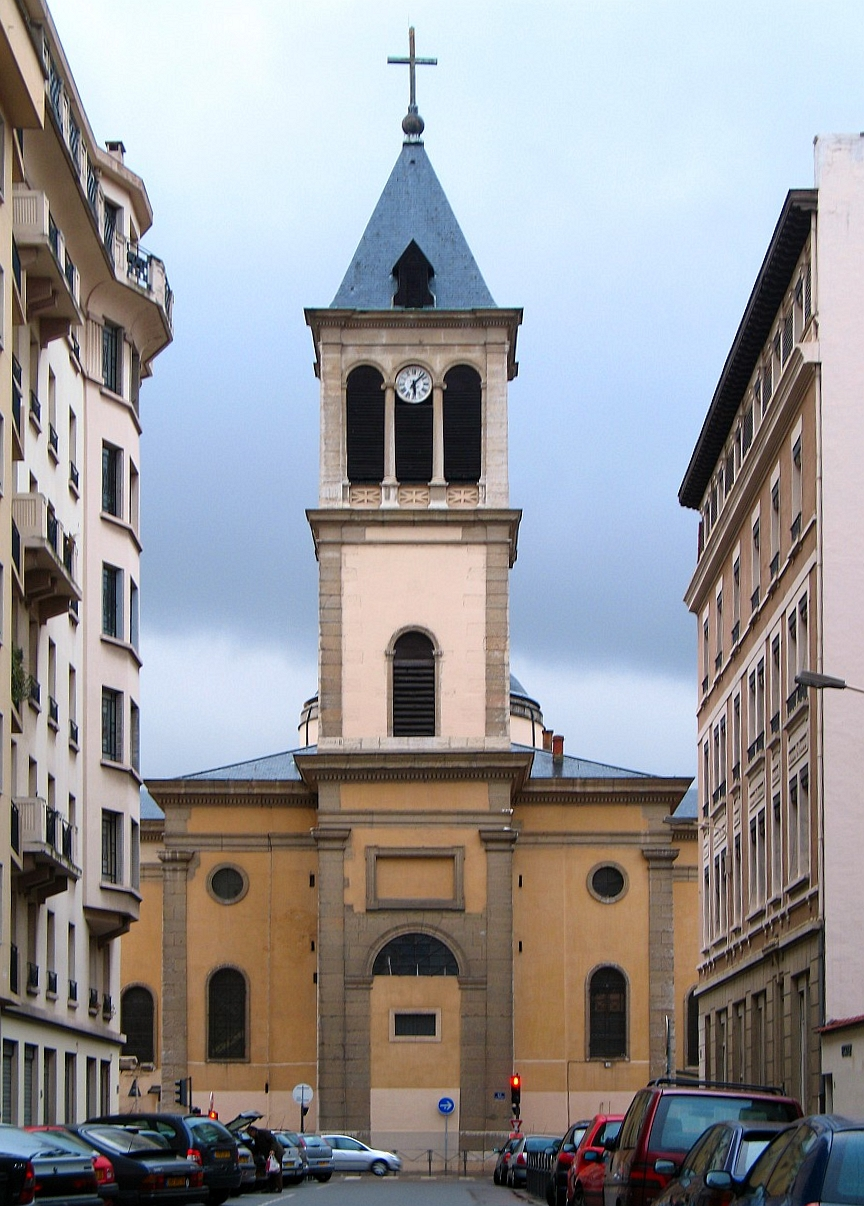
Church of Saint-Pothinus in Lyon.

Pothinus died at the age of ninety, around 177 AD, martyred along with Alexander, Attalus, Espagathus, Maturus, and Sanctius, during Persecution in Lyon during the tenure of Emperor Marcus Aurelius. Pothinus and several companions were seized by a mob and taken to the magistrate; Pothinus is believed to have died from the abuse he suffered in prison, while the others were killed by wild beasts in the local amphitheater.

The similarity of the name Pothinus and the Old French verb foutre lead to syncretic amalgamation of Pothinus and Priapus, under the assimilated name Saint Foutin.

== See also ==
- Persecution in Lyon
- Blandina

Catholic Church titles
New title	Bishop of Lyon; 2nd century	Succeeded by Irenaeus
