= Fouda =

Fouda (فوده) is a surname. It may also be transliterated from Arabic script as Foda or Fawda

Notable people with the surname include:

- André Mama Fouda (born 1951), Cameroonian engineer and politician
- Edwige Abéna Fouda (born 1973), Cameroonian sprinter
- Marie Madeleine Fouda (born 1940), Cameroonian physician and politician
- Polina Fouda (born 2003), Egyptian rhythmic gymnast
- Séraphin Magloire Fouda (fl. from 2003), Cameroonian politician and economist
- Toussaint Fouda (1958–2020), Cameroonian cyclist
- Yosri Fouda (fl. from 1994), Egyptian journalist
