= Foda =

Foda or FODA may be:

== People ==
- Farag Foda (1945–1992), Egyptian human rights activist
- Franco Foda (born 1966), German footballer
- Sandro Foda (born 1989), German footballer

== Other uses ==
- Feature-oriented domain analysis, a domain analysis method which introduced feature modelling to domain engineering
- Foda, a Portuguese profanity
- Foda, a Lamb-based dish from Minho, Monção in Portugal.

== See also ==
- Fouda, a surname
