= Caralho =

Portuguese profanity

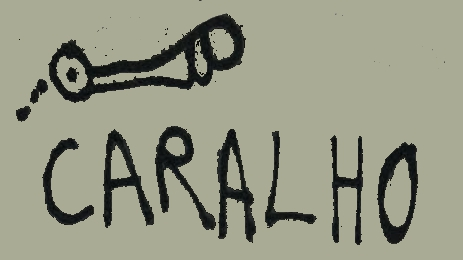
Caralho written in graffiti in Lisbon

Caralho (European Portuguese: [kɐˈɾaʎu], Brazilian Portuguese: [kaˈɾaʎu]) is a vulgar Portuguese-language word with a variety of meanings and uses. Literally, it is a noun referring to the penis, similar to English dick, but it is also used as an interjection expressing surprise, admiration, or dismay in both negative and positive senses in the same way as fuck in English. Caralho is also used in the intensifiers para caralho, placed after adjectives and sometimes adverbs and nouns to mean "very much" or "lots of", and do caralho, both of which are equivalent to the English vulgarities fucking and as fuck.

Caralho is cognate with Spanish carajo and caray, Galician carallo, Asturian carayu and Catalan carall. However, cognates have not been identified in other Iberian languages including Basque. Italian has cazzo, a word with the same meaning, but attempts to link it to the same etymology fail on phonological grounds because the /r/ of carajo (or its absence in cazzo) remains unexplained, and no Latin phonological sequence develops as both /x/ in Spanish and /tts/ in Italian.

Records show that the word has been in use since the 10th century in Portugal, appearing on the "poems of insult and mockery" in the Galician-Portuguese lyric. After the Counter-Reformation, the word became obscene and its original sense meaning the erect penis became less common. Nowadays, caralho is commonly used as a dysphemism and in erotism. The word is also used in the abbreviation form of crl, krl and krai.

== Etymology ==
The etymology of caralho and its cognates is uncertain, but several hypotheses have been put forward. On the basis of both semantics and historical phonology, the most plausible source appears to be unattested Vulgar Latin *c(h)araculum, which would have been a Latinized diminutive of Ancient Greek χάραξ (khárax, "stick").

Philologist and Romanist Joan Coromines suggested that the word may have a Pre-Roman origin in the Celtic root cario.

Etymologist Christian Schmitt proposed that the etymon is Ancient Greek κάρυον (káruon, "nut").

== History ==
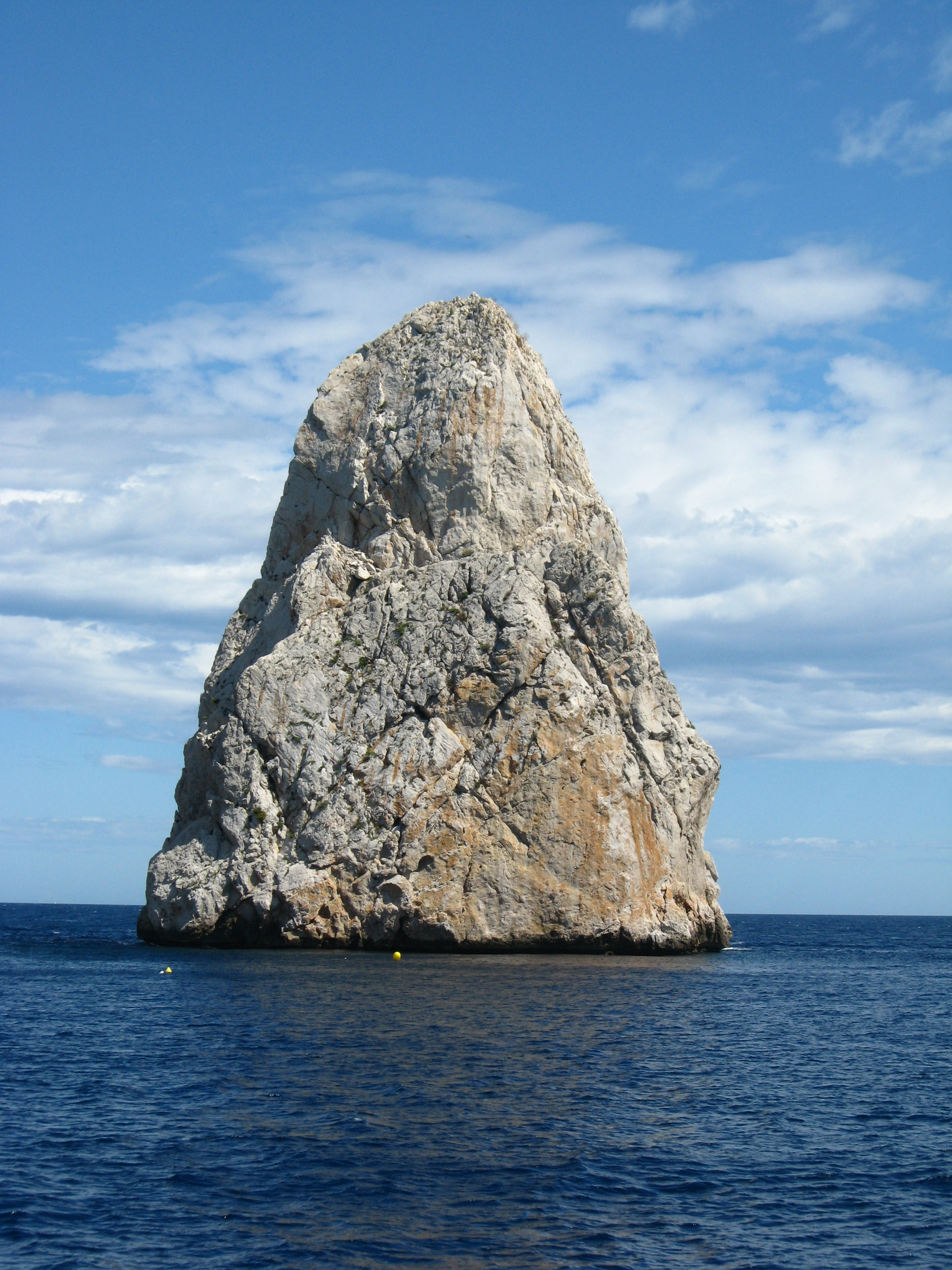
The islet of Carall Bernat in Costa Brava off northeastern Spain, which is named for its phallic shape

In the 10th century, the word was commonly used to name mounts that had a phallic shape. An early evidence of its vulgarity stems from 974, when the Monastery of Sant Pere de Rodes received a donation from Gausfred, Count of Rossillon, which referred to mons Caralio, a nearby mount, as having "a dishonest and indecorous name, although well-known by everyone". In 982, King Lothair of France donated land to the same monastery: pervenit usque in sumitatem ipsius montis qui vocatur Caralio.

A vulgar Galician-language poem from the mid-13th century, by Castilian trovador Pedro Burgalês, uses the word in reference to a woman named Maria Negra, who had a strong desire for the phallus:

Maria Negra, desventuirada
E por que quer tantas pissas comprar?
Pois lhe na mão non queren durar
E lh´assi morren aa malfa[da]da?
E un caralho grande que comprou,
Oonte ao serão o esfolou,
E outra pissa tem ja amormada.

—

Galician-Portuguese poet Martin Soares mentions an anti-hero named Dom Caralhote (a parody of Lancelot) who is kidnapped and locked for life by a damsel he once dishonored:

A bõa dona, molher mui leal,
pois que Caralhote houv'en seu poder,
mui ben soube o que dele fazer:
e meteu-o logu'en un cárcer atal,
u moitos presos jouveron assaz;
Ũa donzela jaz preto d'aquí

—

== See also ==
- Portuguese profanity
- Carajillo – Spanish drink combining coffee with alcohol
- Carajo – Argentine rock band
- Cargados Carajos, islands on the Indian Ocean

== Bibliography ==
- Aguiló, Cosme (1982), "Els Columbrets" (PDF), Felanitx (2319)
- Aguiló, Cosme; Gulsoy, Joseph (2002), Toponímia i etimologia, Biblioteca Miquel dels Sants Oliver, vol. 18, L'Abadia de Montserrat, ISBN 978-84-8415-421-1.
- Álvarez, Rosario; Vilavedra, Dolores (1999), Cinguidos por unha arela común: Homenaxe ó profesor Xesús Alonso Montero, vol. 1, Universidade de Santiago de Compostela, Departamento de Filoloxía Galega, ISBN 978-84-8121-806-0.
- Balari y Jovany, Jose (1899), Origenes Historicos de Cataluña, MAXTOR, ISBN 978-84-9761-677-5.
- Bastardas, Joan (1977), "El Catalá Pre-Literari", in Germà Colón (ed.), Actes del IV Colloqui Internacional de Llengua i Literatura Catalanes, Basilea 1976, Biblioteca "Abat Oliba", vol. 11, L'Abadia de Montserrat, ISBN 978-84-7202-153-2.
- Beirante, Maria Ângela V. da Rocha (1995), Évora na idade média, Textos universitários de ciências sociais e humanas, Fundação Calouste Gulbenkian : Junta Nacional de Investigação Científica e Tecnológica, ISBN 978-972-31-0693-0.
- Benjamin, Roberto Emerson Câmara (2000), "A Media e os Mitos", V CONGRESO LATINOAMERICANO DE CIENCIAS DE LA COMUNICACIÓN – ALAIC 2000 - 26-29 de abril del 2000 (DOC), Santiago, Chile: Universidad Diego Portales.
- Boullón Agrelo, Ana Isabel (2012), "Trazos da Oralidade na Lingua Galega Medieval", in Juan Pedro Sánchez Méndez (ed.), Oralidad y Escritura en la Edad Media Hispánica, Valencia: Tirant Humanidades, ISBN 978-84-15442-42-4.
- Camacho Taboada, María Victoria; Rodríguez Toro, José Javier; Santana Marrero, Juana; López Morales, Humberto (2009), Estudios de lengua española: descripción, variación y uso: homenaje a Humberto López Morales, Iberoamericana Editorial, ISBN 978-84-8489-364-6.
- Casagrande Júnior, Osmar (2010), "Cu é lindo – o palavrão como recurso do erotismo na lírica contemporânea brasileira" (PDF), REVELL – Revista de Estudos Literários da UEMS, Ano 01 (1), ISSN 2179-4456, archived from the original (PDF) on 2021-09-05.
- Chacón Calvar, Rafael (January 2008), Carajo, carallo / Caralho, Carall, La Cueva de Zaratustra, archived from the original on 2012-02-03.
- Fisas, Carlos (1989), Historias de la historia (9ª ed.), Planeta, ISBN 978-84-320-4504-2.
- Flores Varela, Camilo; Couceiro Pérez, Xosé Luis (1999), Homenaxe ó profesor Camilo Flores, vol. 1, Universidade de Santiago de Compostela, ISBN 978-84-8121-787-2.
- Gaitán Orjuela, Efraín (1970), Biografía de las palabras: sentido, origen y anécdota de muchos vocablos españoles, Bolsilibros Bedout, vol. 70 (3ª ed.), Bedout.
- Galmés de Fuentes, Álvaro (1986), "Toponimia asturiana y asociación etimológica", Lletres Asturianes (19): 31–39.
- Galmés de Fuentes, Álvaro (1996), Toponimia: Mito e Historia, Real Academia de la Historia, ISBN 978-84-95983-94-7.
- García, Santiago Gutiérrez; Gradín, Pilar Lorenzo (2001), A literatura artúrica en Galicia e Portugal na Idade Media, Biblioteca de divulgación: Serie Galicia, Universidade de Santiago de Compostela, ISBN 978-84-8121-882-4.
- González Pérez, R. (1991), "Umgangsprache in der Iberoromania. Festschrift fur Heinz Kroll", Revista Española de Lingüística, 21 (1).
- Grimes, Larry M. (1978), El tabú lingüístico en México, Studies in the language and literature of United States Hispanos, Editorial Bilingüe, ISBN 978-0-916950-10-1.
- Hansen, João Adolfo (2004), A sátira e o engenho: Gregório de Matos e a Bahia do século XVII (2ª ed.), Atelie Editorial, ISBN 978-85-268-0677-1.
- Kröll, Heinz (1984), O Eufemismo e o Disfemismo no Português Moderno, Colecção Biblioteca Breve, vol. 84, ICALP, archived from the original on 2013-05-31.
- Lapa, Manuel Rodrigues (1965), Cantigas d'escarnho e de mal dizer: dos cancioneiros medievais galego-portugueses, Colección filolóxica, Editorial Galaxia.
- Malte-Brun, Conrad; Malte-Brun, Victor Adolfe (1833), Nouvelles annales des voyages, Gide fils.
- Moreu Rey, Enric (1982), Els nostres noms de lloc, Treballs i els dies, vol. 22, Moll.
- Munné, Juan Clemente Zamora; Guitart, Jorge M. (1982), Dialectologiá hispanoamericana: teoría, descripción, historia, Colección Lingüística, vol. 3 (2ª ed.), Colegio de España, ISBN 978-84-7455-037-5.
- Nobíling, Oskar (1907), As Cantigas de D. Joan Garcia de Guilhade, Erlangen.
- Souza, Tatiane Reis Dias de (2010), "A representação erótica do índio no poema Elixir do pajé, de Bernardo Guimarães", E-hum, 3 (1), Belo Horizonte
- Tavani, Giuseppe (2002), Trovadores e jograis: introdução à poesia medieval galego-portuguesa, Estudos de literatura portuguesa, Caminho, ISBN 978-972-21-1466-0.
- Vila-Coia, Xabier (2001), Ghaliça C i B, Xabier Vila-Coia, ISBN 978-84-607-2992-1.
