= Latin obscenity =

Profane words in Latin

Latin obscenity is the profane, indecent, or impolite vocabulary of Latin, and its uses. Words deemed obscene were described as obsc(a)ena (obscene, lewd, unfit for public use), or improba (improper, in poor taste, undignified). Documented obscenities occurred rarely in classical Latin literature, limited to certain types of writing such as epigrams, but they are commonly used in the graffiti written on the walls of Pompeii and Herculaneum. Among the documents of interest in this area is a letter written by Cicero in 45 BC (ad Fam. 9.22) to a friend called Paetus, in which he alludes to a number of obscene words without actually naming them.

Apart from graffiti, the writers who used obscene words most were Catullus and Martial in their shorter poems. Another source is the anonymous Priapeia (see External links below), a collection of 95 epigrams supposedly written to adorn statues of the fertility god Priapus, whose wooden image was customarily set up to protect orchards against thieves. The earlier poems of Horace also contained some obscenities. However, the satirists Persius and Juvenal, although often describing obscene acts, did so without mentioning the obscene words. Medical, especially veterinary, texts also use certain anatomical words that, outside of their technical context, might have been considered obscene.

== Latin taboo words ==
=== Cicero's letter ad Fam. 9.22 ===
In a letter to one of his friends, written about 45 BC, Cicero discusses a number of obscenities in Latin. It appears that the friend, Lucius Papirius Paetus (whose letters to Cicero have not been preserved), had used the word mentula ('penis') in one of his letters. Cicero praises him for his forthrightness, which he says conforms to the teachings of the Stoic philosophers, but says that he himself prefers modesty (verēcundia).

In the letter Cicero alludes to a number of obscene words, without actually mentioning them. The words which he alludes to but avoids are: cūlus ('arsehole'), mentula ('penis'), cunnus ('cunt'), landīca ('clitoris'), and cōleī ('balls'). He also objects to words which mean 'to fuck', as well as to the Latin word bīnī 'two' because for bilingual speakers it sounds like the Greek βινεῖ (bineî) ('he fucks or sodomises'), and also to two words for passing wind, vīssiō and pēdō. He does not object to using the word ānus, and says that pēnis, which in his day was obscene, was formerly just a euphemism meaning 'tail'.

=== Degrees of obscenity ===
There thus appear to have been various degrees of obscenity in Latin, with words for anything to do with sex in the most obscene category. These words are strictly avoided in most types of Latin literature; however, they are common in graffiti, and also in certain genres of poetry, such as the short poems known as epigrams, such as those written by Catullus and Martial. The poet Horace also used obscenities in his early poems, that is the Epodes and the first book of Satires, but later writers of satire such as Juvenal and Persius avoided the coarser words even when discussing obscene topics. There were, however, some occasions in public life, such as in triumphal processions, at weddings, and at certain festivals, where obscenities were traditionally allowed. The purpose of these was presumably twofold, first to ward off the evil eye or potential envy of the gods, and second to promote fertility.

=== Euphemistic expressions ===
A very common way of avoiding words for sexual acts was simply to omit the word in question. J.N. Adams collects numerous examples of this. For example, in Horace (Epodes 12.15):

Īnachiam ter nocte potes

('You are capable of [having sex with] Inachia three times in a night.')

Another way was to substitute the taboo word with a milder one or a metaphor, for example using clūnēs ('rump (of an animal)') for cūlus or testiculī for cōleī.

Sometimes the offending word was replaced by a pronoun such as istuc ('that') or an adverb such as illīc ('there'), as in Martial (11.104.16):

et quamvīs Ithacō stertente pudīca solēbat
illīc Pēnelopē semper habēre manum

('And when the Ithacan was snoring, modest though she was,
Penelope always kept her hand there.')

== Mentula: the penis ==
Mentula is the basic Latin word for penis. It is used 48 times in Martial, 26 times in the Priapeia, and 18 times in Pompeian inscriptions. Its status as a basic obscenity is confirmed by the Priapeia 29, in which mentula and cunnus are given as ideal examples of obscene words:

obscēnis, peream, Priāpe, sī nōn
ūtī mē pudet improbīsque verbīs
sed cum tū positō deus pudōre
ostendās mihi cōleōs patentēs
cum cunnō mihi mentula est vocanda

('May I die if it doesn't shame me
to use obscene and improper words;
but when you, Priapus, as a god, shamelessly
show me your balls hanging out,
it is appropriate for me to speak of cunts and cocks.')

Martial mocks a friend who despised effeminate clothing, explaining why he suspects that he is secretly homosexual:

rogābit unde suspicer virum mollem.
ūnā lavāmur: aspicit nihil sūrsum,
sed spectat oculīs dēvorantibus draucōs
nec ōtiosīs mentulās videt labrīs.

('He will ask why I suspect him to be a "soft" man.
We go to the baths together. He never looks at anything above,
but examines the athletes with devouring eyes,
and looks at their dicks with constantly moving lips.')

A draucus (the word occurs only in Martial), according to Housman, was a man 'who performs feats of strength in public'. Rabun Taylor disagrees and sees a draucus more as a kind of rent boy who hung around in the baths in search of patrons.

Mentula also frequently appears in the poetry of Catullus. He uses Mentula as a nickname for Mamurra, as if it were an ordinary name, as in his epigram 105:

Mentula cōnātur Pipleium scandere montem:
Mūsae furcillīs praecipitem ēiciunt.

('That prick tries to climb the Pimpleian mount (of poetry);
the Muses drive him out with pitchforks.')

(Pimpleia was a place in Pieria in northern Greece associated with the Muses (the nine goddesses of poetry and music).)

=== Etymology ===
The etymology of mentula is obscure, although outwardly it would appear to be a diminutive of mēns, gen. mentis, the 'mind' (i.e. 'the little mind'). Cicero's letter 9:22 ad Familiares relates it to menta, a spearmint stalk. Tucker's Etymological Dictionary of Latin relates it to ēminēre, 'to project outwards', mentum, 'chin', and mōns, 'a mountain', all of which suggest an Indo-European root *men-. Other hypotheses have also been suggested, though none generally accepted.

=== Synonyms and metaphors ===
==== verpa ====
Verpa is also a basic Latin obscenity for 'penis', in particular for a penis with the foreskin retracted due to erection and glans exposed, as in the illustration of the god Mercury below. As a result, it was "not a neutral technical term, but an emotive and highly offensive word", most commonly used in despective or threatening contexts of violent acts against a fellow male or rival rather than mere sex (futūtiō 'fucking'). It is found frequently in graffiti of the type verpes (= verpa es) quī istuc legēs ('Whoever reads this, you're a dickhead').

It is found less frequently in Classical Latin literature, but it does appear in Catullus 28:

ō Memmī, bene mē ac diū supīnum
tōtā istā trabe lentus irrumāstī.
sed, quantum videō, parī fuistis
cāsū: nam nihilō minōre verpā
fartī estis.

('O Memmius, while I lay on my back for a long time
you fed me good and slow with that entire beam of yours.
But as far as I can see, you guys have met with the same fate:
for you have been stuffed with a verpa no less large!')

Catullus is here speaking metaphorically. He complains that when he accompanied Gaius Memmius, the governor of Bithynia (57-56 BC), as part of his entourage, he was not allowed to make money out of the position. From this poem it is clear that Catullus's friends Veranius and Fabullus were kept under an equally close rein when they accompanied Lucius Piso to his province of Macedonia in 57-55 BC.

By extension, verpus as a masculine adjective or noun, referred to a man whose glans was exposed by erection or by circumcision; thus Juvenal (14.100) has

quaesītum ad fontem sōlōs dēdūcere verpōs

('To guide only the circumcised [i.e. Jews] to the fountain that they seek').

And in poem 47 Catullus writes:

vōs Vērāniolō meō et Fabullō
verpus praeposuit Priāpus ille?

('Did that unsheathed Priapus prefer you guys
to my little Veranius and Fabullus?')

In Martial's time, it was a common practice for actors and athletes to be fitted with a fībula (a pin or brooch covering the foreskin) to prevent accidental exposure of the glans, discouraging sex and thereby preserving their voice or strength. Martial (7.82) mocks one such actor as follows:

Mēnophilī pēnem tam grandis fībula vestit
ut sit cōmoedīs omnibus ūna satis.
hunc ego crēdideram, nam saepe lavāmur in ūnum,
sollicitum vōcī parcere, Flacce, suae:
dum lūdit mediā populō spectante palaestrā,
dēlāpsa est miserō fībula: verpus erat.

('Such a big brooch clothes Menophilus's penis
that it is enough for all the comic actors in the world.
I believed (since we often go to the baths together)
that he was anxious to preserve his voice, Flaccus.
But one day, while he was wrestling in the middle of the palaestra with everyone watching,
the poor man's brooch fell off. He was circumcised!')

==== mūtō or muttō ====
A third word for 'penis' was mūtō, mūtōnis (or muttō, muttōnis). This is very rare and found only in one line of Horace and a fragment of the satirist Lucilius. The passage in Horace (Sat. 1.2.68) is as follows, in which he advises a young man who was beaten up as a result of an affair with the dictator Sulla's daughter:

huic si mūtōnis verbīs mala tanta videntī
dīceret haec animus 'quid vīs tibi? numquid ego ā tē
magnō prognātum dēpōscō cōnsule cunnum
vēlātumque stolā, mea cum conferbuit īra?'

('What if, in the words of his penis, his mind were to say to the man when he sees such troubles: "What exactly do you want? Do I ever demand a cunt descended from a famous consul or veiled in a fancy gown when my passion grows hot?"')

And Lucilius says, referring to the fact that Roman men apparently used to masturbate with their left hand:

at laevā lacrimās muttōnī absterget amīcā

('But with his left hand as his girlfriend, he wipes away his muttō's tears.')

The word mūtō may be related to the marriage deity Mutunus Tutunus.

Although mūtō itself is rare, the derivative mūtūniātus ('well-endowed') is found twice in Martial, as at 3.73:

dormīs cum puerīs mūtūniātīs,
et non stat tibi, Phoebe, quod stat illīs

('You sleep with well-endowed boys, Phoebus,
and the thing that stands up for them does not stand up for you.')

The derivative mūtōnium, meaning the same as mūtō, is found in Lucilius and in two Pompeian graffiti.

==== pēnis ====
The Latin word pēnis itself originally meant 'tail'. Cicero's ad Familiārēs, 9.22, observes that pēnis originally was an innocuous word, but that the meaning of male sexual organ had become primary by his day. The euphemism is used occasionally by Catullus, Persius, Juvenal, and Martial, and even once by the historian Sallust, who writes that the supporters of the anti-government rebel Catiline included

quīcumque inpudīcus, adulter, gāneō manū, ventre, pēne bona patria lacerāverat

('whatever shameless man, adulterer, or glutton had ruined his ancestral property by hand, stomach, or "tail"')

Commenting on this passage, St Augustine notes that Sallust's use of the term pēnis in this phrase was not offensive. The word did not survive into Romance, however, and occurs only once in a Pompeian inscription.

Juvenal, showing his knack for describing grossly obscene matters without using taboo words, writes as follows in one of his satires (9.43-4):

an facile et prōnum est agere intrā viscera pēnem
lēgitimum atque illīc hesternae occurrere cēnae?

('Or do you think it is an easy or straightforward thing to drive a proper-sized "tail"
inside someone's guts and there meet with yesterday's dinner?')

==== cauda ====
Another euphemism for the penis was cauda ('tail'), which occurs twice in Horace, and continues today in the French derivative queue ('tail' or 'penis'). In one place in his Satires (Serm. 2.7.50) Horace writes:

quaecumque excēpit turgentis verbera caudae,
clūnibus aut agitāvit equum lascīva supīnum,
dīmittit neque fāmōsum neque sollicitum nē
dītior aut formae meliōris meiat eōdem.

('Whichever girl receives the blows of my swelling "tail",
or when I'm on my back sexily rides my 'horse' with her buttocks,
sends me away neither with a bad reputation nor worried that
a richer or more handsome guy might piss in the same place.')

For the metaphorical use of meiere ('to piss'), see below.

==== nervus ====
The words nervus ('nerve' or 'sinew') and In one of Horace's Epodes (12) a woman boasts of one of her lovers, Coan Amyntas,

cuius in indomitō cōnstantior inguine nervus
quam nova collibus arbor inhaeret.

('on whose indomitable groin a sinew grows,
more constant than a new tree clings to the hills.')

==== fascinum or fascinus ====
fascinum or fascinus, which meant a phallic image or amulet in the form of a penis, were also sometimes used as euphemisms for the penis.

And one of the characters in Petronius's Satyricon, Ascyltus, is described as follows:

habēbat enim inguinum pondus tam grande, ut ipsum hominem laciniam fascinī crēderēs

('For he had a weight on his groins so big that you'd think the man himself was just an appendage of his phallus.')

==== cōlēs or caulis ====
Yet another euphemism is cōlēs or cōlis or caulis, which literally means the stem or stalk of a plant (such as a cabbage, onion, or vine). This word was used by the satirist Lucilius and by the medical writer Celsus (6.18.2).

==== glāns ====
In the same passage (6.18.2), Celsus refers to the foreskin as cutis 'skin', and to the glans as glāns 'acorn'. Martial also uses the word glāns in an obscene pun (12.75.3):

pastās glande natīs habet Secundus

('Secundus has buttocks which have fed on acorns')

==== pipinna ====
The word pipinna seems to have been children's slang for the penis; compare English pee-pee. It appears in Martial 11.71:

draucī Natta suī vorat pipinnam,
collātus cui gallus est Priāpus.

('Natta sucks the pee-pee of his athlete,
compared to whom, Priapus is a eunuch.')

For draucus, see on mentula above. A gallus was an emasculated member of the cult of Cybele; according to Taylor (1997), they had much in common with the hijras of India today.

==== gurguliō ====
The penis was compared to a throat or neck in these lines of Martial (9.27.1–2), which mock a philosopher who has plucked the hairs from his private parts with tweezers (volsellae):

cum dēpilātōs, Chrēste, cōleōs portēs
et vulturīnō mentulam parem collō

('when you carry around depilated balls, Chrestus,
and a dick just like a vulture's neck')

Similarly Persius in his 4th satire refers to the penis as gurgulio 'neck, gullet'. In the following lines he imagines young Alcibiades (or an Alcibiades-like youth) sunbathing in a public bath and comments on the fact that though he now has a full beard on his chin he still "weeds" all the hairs out of his private parts:

at sī ūnctus cessēs et fīgās in cute sōlem,
est prope tē ignōtus cubitō quī tangat et ācre
dēspuat: 'hī mōrēs! pēnemque arcānaque lumbī
runcantem populō marcentīs pandere vulvās.
tum, cum maxillīs balanātum gausape pectās,
inguinibus quārē dētōnsus gurgulio extat?
quīnque palaestrītae licet haec plantāria vellant
ēlixāsque natēs labefactent forcipe aduncā,
non tamen ista filix ūllō mānsuēscit arātrō.

('But if after being oiled you take a rest and fix the sun on your skin,
near you there is a stranger to nudge you will his elbow and spit scornfully:
'What morals! To weed one's penis and the secret parts of one's loins
and to display a withered vulva to the public!
And when you comb a balsamed rug on your jaw,
why does a shorn gurgulio stick out from your groin?
Even though five gym-attendants pluck at that vegetation
and make your boiled buttocks smooth with their curved tweezers,
yet that "bracken" of yours can't be tamed by any plough.')

That gurgulio here means 'throat' or 'gullet' is supported by a scholiast (early commentator). However, Adams, the expert on Roman sexual vocabulary, prefers the idea that this word is also a by-form of curculio, a grain weevil. Another scholar Wehrle, pointing to the horticultural imagery, thinks the metaphor refers to the larva of a weevil.

==== lacerta ====
The word lacerta (literally, 'lizard'), like the equivalent σαύρα saurā in the pederastic poems of Strato or Straton, appears sometimes to have been used of the penis. Since the word perīre 'to die' can be used of orgasm, an obscene meaning seems to be implied by the following couplet of Martial (14.172):

ad tē reptantī, puer īnsidiose, lacertae
parce; cupit digitīs illa perīre tuīs.

('Spare this lizard crawling towards you, treacherous boy,
It wants to die between your fingers')

Since Strato also uses the word βάτος batos 'bramble' metaphorically of the female genitalia, a similar erotic implication has been seen in Horace's Odes 1.23 where Horace writes:

viridēs rubum / dīmōvēre lacertae

('green lizards have parted the bramble bush')

an action which has apparently caused the knees of Chloe (the girl Horace is pursuing) to tremble. A similar sexual implication has been seen in Virgil's Eclogue 2.9, in which the rustic shepherd Corydon is singing of his hopeless love for the boy Alexis:

nunc viridēs etiam occultant spīnēta lacertōs

('now the thickets are even hiding the green lizards')

==== sōpiō ====
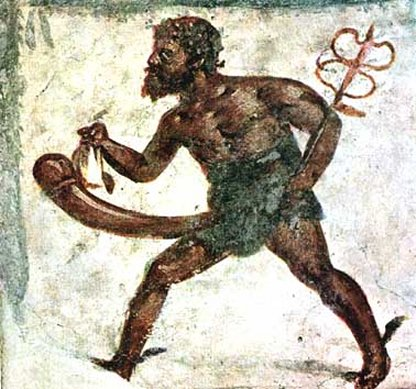
An example of a sōpio (see below), the god Mercury was depicted with an enormous penis on this fresco from Pompeii.

The obscure word sōpiō (gen. sōpiōnis) seems to have meant a sexualized caricature with an abnormally large penis, such as the Romans were known to draw. It appears in Catullus 37:

frontem tabernae sōpiōnibus scrībam

('I will graffiti the front of the tavern with sōpiōs')

and in a graffito from Pompeii:

ut merdās edātis, quī scrīpserās sōpiōnīs

('may you guys eat shit, whoever you are who drew sopios!')

The grammarian Sacerdos preserves a quotation about Pompey, that says quem non pudet et rubet, nōn est homō, sed sōpiō ('whoever is not ashamed, and does not blush, is not a man, but a sopio.') Sōpiō would appear to describe drawings such as that of the god Mercury in the illustration.

=== Erection ===
The verb arrigō, arrigere meant 'to have an erection'. Martial (6.36) in one epigram teases a certain friend:

mentula tam magna est quantus tibi, Pāpyle, nāsus,
ut possīs, quotiēns arrigis, olfacere

('Your cock is as big as your nose is long, Papylus, so that you can smell it whenever you get an erection.')

Suetonius's Lives of the Twelve Caesars, quotes a letter from Mark Antony to Augustus which contains the sentence:

an rēfert, ubi et in quā arrigās?

('Does it make any difference where or in which woman you get hard?')

The participle arrēctus means 'erect'. Martial describes the habit of a certain girl of weighing a lover's penis in her hand (10.55.1):

arrēctum quotiēns Marulla pēnem
pēnsāvit digitīs...

('Whenever Marulla weighs an erect penis in her fingers...')

Martial uses the word rigidam ('a hard one') alone to refer to a penis in the following line, mocking a certain Greek philosopher who despite his beard was effeminate (9.47.6):

in mollī rigidam clūne libenter habēs

('You enjoy having a hard one in your soft backside')

Another word for "erect" was tentus ('stretched, extended'). Priapus is addressed as tente Priāpe in Priāpeia 81, and as being fascinō gravis tentō ('heavy with an extended phallus') in Priāpeia 79.

An "erection" or "impatience to have sex" was tentīgō. Horace (Sat. 1.2.116-8) writes:

...tument tibi cum inguina, num, sī
ancilla aut verna est praestō puer, impetus in quem
continuō fīat, mālīs tentīgine rumpī?

('When your groin swells up, then if
a slave girl or home-reared slave boy is available, on whom you can mount an attack
straightaway, do you prefer to burst with the erection?')

Similarly in Priapeia 33.5, the god Priapus says:

turpe quidem factū, sed nē tentīgine rumpar,
falce mihī positā fīet amīca manus.

('Shameful indeed to do, but so that I don't burst with desire,
I shall put down my sickle and my hand will become my girlfriend.')

An adjective to describe a penis which refused to become erect was languida. Ovid (Amōrēs 3.7.65-6):

nostra tamen iacuēre velut praemortua membra
turpiter hesternā languidiora rosā

('But my members lay there as if prematurely dead,
shamefully, more languid than yesterday's rose.')

And a girlfriend of Horace's chides him with the words (Epodes 12):

Inachiā languēs minus ac mē

('You are less limp with Inachia than with me!')

While Catullus (67.23) speaks of an impotent husband in these terms:

languidior tenerā cui pendēns sīcula bētā
nunquam sē mediam sustulit ad tunicam

('whose little dagger, hanging more flaccid than a tender beet (a vegetable)
never raised itself to the middle of his tunic')

=== In the Romance languages ===
Mentula has evolved into Sicilian and Italian minchia and South Sardinian minca. Minga also exists in Spanish. Verpa is preserved in some Romance dialects, usually with another meaning; verpile is a sort of stirrup and spur in a Calabrian dialect, possibly named for its shape. Most Romance languages have adopted metaphorical euphemisms as the chief words for the penis; as in Spanish, Portuguese and Italian verga, obscene for penis, and in Romanian vargă (although pulă is far more common) and mădular ('organ' or 'part of a whole' but most often meaning 'penis'), in Catalan and French verge, from Latin virga, 'rod', and French queue ('tail'), from Latin cauda/cōda 'tail'. The Portuguese caralho 'penis', first attested in the 10th century, is thought to derive from a Vulgar Latin word *caraculum 'a little stake'. The Italian cazzo has no obvious Latin ancestor. A number of different suggestions have been made for its origin, but none has yet gained general acceptance.

== Cōleī: the testicles ==
The basic word for the testicles in Latin was cōleī (singular: cōleus). It appears to have had an alternative form *cōleōnēs (singular: cōleō), from which the Spanish cojones and other Romance forms are derived. (One late Latin source has the spelling culiones.)

=== Etymology ===
The etymology of cōleī is obscure. Tucker, without explanation, gives *qogh-sleǐ-os (*k^{w}og^{h}-sley-os?), and relates it to cohum, an obscure word for 'yoke'.

Lewis and Short's Latin Dictionary relates the word to culleus ('a leather sack for liquids'). However, this etymology is not generally accepted today, and according to the Thesaurus Linguae Latinae the etymology is unknown. In texts, the word for testicles is always spelled with col- not cull-, and is plural.

=== Usage ===
Cicero in his letter discussing obscene Latin words (ad Fam. 9.22) says at one point honestī cōleī Lānuvīnī, Clīternīnī nōn honestī ('Lanuvian cōleī are respectable, but "Cliternian" ones are indecent'). (Lanuvium and Cliternia were small towns not far from Rome.) However, the meaning of these phrases is not known, according to the Thesaurus Linguae Latinae.

The word occurs in Petronius (44):

sī nōs cōleōs habērēmus, nōn tantum sibi placēret

('if we had any balls (i.e. if we were real men), he wouldn't be so pleased with himself!')

A Pompeian graffito quotes a line of iambic verse:

senī supīnō cōleī cūlum tegunt

('When an old man lies down, his testicles cover his butthole.')

The form of the line is reminiscent of the proverbial sayings of Publilius Syrus, many of which employ the same metre.

=== Synonyms and metaphors ===
The more decent word in Latin for testicles was testēs (sing. testis). This word may have derived from the Latin for 'witnesses'. Cicero's letter says "testēs" verbum honestissimum in iūdiciō, aliō locō nōn nimis. ('In a court of law, "witnesses" is a quite decent word; not too much so elsewhere.') Katz (1998) draws attention to the fact that in some cultures it was customary to take a solemn oath while laying hands on the testicles either of a living person (as in Genesis 24:2-4; 47:29-31), or of a sacrificed animal (as described in Demosthenes 23.67f); a similar ritual took place in Umbria when dedicating a sacrificial animal. According to Katz, the word testis itself appears to be derived from the root trityo- ('third') and originally meant a third party.

The two meanings of testēs open the door for puns such as the following from Martial (2.72):

quid quod habet testēs, Postume, Caecilius?

('What about the fact that Caecilius has witnesses/testicles, Postumus?')

Or Cicero's testīs ēgregiōs! ('outstanding witnesses!') in his amusing account of two witnesses hiding naked in a public bathhouse.

The diminutive testiculī was entirely confined to the anatomical sense; it is used 33 times by the medical writer Celsus, but testis not at all. The satirists Persius and Juvenal also used the word testiculī. Veterinary writers use both testis and testiculus.

In Catullus (63.5), the testicles are famously referred to as pondera ('weights'), perhaps a metaphor of the weights hung on threads of a loom. The exact words of the text here are disputed, but the general sense is clear:

dēvolsit īlī acūtō sibi pondera silice

('He tore off the weights of his groin with a sharp flint')

Ovid (Fasti 2.241) recounting the same story, and perhaps implying that Attis removed the whole organ, similarly uses the phrase onus inguinis ('the burden of his groin').

Other euphemisms are used in other writers. Ovid (Amōrēs 2.3) uses the phrase membra genitālia:

quī prīmus puerīs genitālia membra recīdit,
vulnera quae fēcit, dēbuit ipse patī.

('He who first cut off the genital parts of boys
ought himself to have suffered the wounds which he made.')

=== In the Romance languages ===
Cōleōnēs is productive in most of the Romance languages: cf. Italian coglioni, French couilles, couillons; Portuguese colhões, Galician collóns, collois, collós, Catalan collons, Sardinian cozzones, Romanian coi, coaie, Spanish cojones (now a loanword in English).

== Cunnus: the vulva ==
Cunnus was the basic Latin word for the vulva. The Priapeia mention it in connection with mentula, above.

=== Etymology ===
Cunnus has a distinguished Indo-European lineage. It is cognate with Persian kun 'anus' and kos 'vulva', and with Greek κύσθος (kusthos). Tucker and de Vaan derive it from an Indo-European *kut-nos akin to Welsh cwd 'bag, scrotum'. Despite its similarity to "cunt", the Oxford English Dictionary cautions that the two words may have developed from different roots.

=== Usage ===
Cicero's Orator (ad Marcum Brutum) §154 confirms its obscene status. Cicero writes:

dīcitur "cum illīs"; "cum autem nōbīs" non dīcitur, sed "nobīscum"; quia sī ita dīcerētur, obscaenius concurrerent litterae.

('We say cum illīs ('with them'), but we don't say cum nobis ["with us'], but rather nobiscum; because if we said it like that, the letters would run together in a rather obscene way.')

Because the /m/ of cum assimilates to the /n/ of nōbīs, cum nōbīs sounds very similar to cunnō bis, meaning 'in/from/with a cunt twice'. A similar euphemism occurs in French: the avoidance of qu'on, homophone to con (cunt), by the insertion of a superfluous letter: que l'on.

Horace, however, uses the word cunnus in his Satires (Sermones) at 1.2.70, and again at 1.3.105:

Nam fuit ante Helenam cunnus taeterrima bellī
causa. . .

('For even before Helen, the cunt was a most loathsome cause of war')

Martial also uses it freely, for example (3.87):

nārrat tē rūmor, Chionē, numquam esse futūtam
atque nihil cunnō pūrius esse tuō.
tēcta tamen non hāc, quā dēbēs, parte lavāris:
sī pudor est, trānsfer subligar in faciem.

('Rumour has it, Chione, that you have never been fucked
and that there is nothing purer than your cunt.
However, you go to the baths without covering the part you should;
if you have any modesty, transfer your loincloth to your face!')

The following obscene poetic graffito from Pompeii is written in the trochaic septenarius metre:

futuitur cunnus [pi]llōsus multō melius [qu]am glaber
e[ād]em continet vapōrem et eādem ve[rr]it mentulam

('A hairy cunt is fucked much better than a smooth one:
at the same time it retains the heat and at the same time it brushes the cock')

The word cunnilingus occurs in literary Latin, most frequently in Martial; it denotes the person who performs the action, not the action itself as in modern English, where it is not obscene but technical. The term comes from the Latin word for the vulva (cunnus) and the verb 'to lick' (lingere, cf. lingua 'tongue').

=== Synonyms and metaphors ===
These include sinus, 'indentation', and fossa, 'ditch'; also olla or ollula 'pot'.

The modern scientific or polite words vulva and vagina both stem from Latin, but originally they had different meanings. The word vāgīna is the Latin word for scabbard or sword-sheath.

Vulva (or volva) in classical Latin generally signified the womb, especially in medical writing, and it is also common in the Vetus Latina (pre-Jerome) version of the Bible. The meanings of vāgīna and vulva have changed by means of metaphor and metonymy, respectively. Other words for the womb are uterus, mātrīx (in later Latin), venter ('belly'), and alvus (also 'belly'). At Juvenal 6.129, however, the word volva is used of the vagina or clitoris of the (allegedly) nymphomaniac empress Messalina, who is described as departing from a session in a brothel:

adhūc ardēns rigidae tentīgine volvae,
et lassāta virīs necdum satiāta recessit

('still burning with the excitement of her rigid volva,
tired out by men but still not satisfied, she departs')

=== In the Romance languages ===
Cunnus is preserved in almost every Romance language: e.g. French con, Catalan cony, Spanish coño, Galician cona, Portuguese cona, (South) Sardinian cunnu, Old Italian cunna. In Calabrian dialects the forms cunnu (m.) and cunna (f.) are used as synonyms of 'stupid, dumb'; the same is true of the French con, conne and in fact this has become the primary meaning of the words, both eclipsing the genital sense and significantly reducing the word's obscenity. In Portuguese it has been transferred to the feminine gender; the form cunna is also attested in Pompeian graffiti and in some late Latin texts.

== Landīca: the clitoris ==
The ancient Romans had medical knowledge of the clitoris, and their native word for it was landīca. This appears to have been one of the most obscene words in the entire Latin lexicon. It is alluded to, but does not appear, in literary sources, except in the Priapeia 79, which calls it misella landīca, the 'poor little clitoris'. It does, however, appear in graffiti.

=== Usage ===
Not even the poets Catullus and Martial, whose frankness is notorious, ever refer to landīca. In a letter to a friend, Cicero discusses which words in Latin are potentially obscene or subject to obscene punning, and there hints at the word landīca by quoting an unintentionally obscene utterance made in the Senate:

. . . hanc culpam maiōrem an illam dīcam?

'shall I say that this or that was the greater fault?'

with illam dīcam echoing the forbidden word. Note that the "m" at the end of illam was pronounced like "n" before the following "d".

The word landīca is found in Roman graffiti: peto [la]ndicam fvlviae ('I seek Fulvia's clitoris') appears on a leaden projectile found at Perugia left over from the Perusine War, while a derivative word is found in Pompeii: evpl(i)a laxa landicosa ('Euplia (is) loose and has a large clitoris').

It also occurs in Priapeia 78.5 (in some versions 79.5), where a girl who has received the attentions of a cunnilingus is described as suffering from landīcae ... fossīs ('cracks in her clitoris').

at dī deaeque dentibus tuīs escam
negent, amīcae cunnilinge vīcīnae,
per quem puella fortis ante nec mendāx
et quae solēbat impigrō celer passū
ad nōs venīre, nunc misella landīcae
vix posse iūrat ambulāre prae fossīs.

('But may the gods and goddesses deny your teeth any food, you who licked the cunt of my neighbouring girlfriend, because of whom this brave girl who has never told a lie, and who used to come running quickly to me, now, poor thing, swears she can hardly walk because of the grooves in her clitoris.')

The word also occurs twice in a medical context in a 5th-6th century Latin translation of Soranus of Ephesus's book on gynaecology.

Fay (1907) suggests one possible etymology as (g)landīca ('a little gland').

=== Synonyms and metaphors ===
Martial's epigram 1.90 alludes to a woman who uses her clitoris as a penis in a lesbian encounter, referring to it as her 'prodigious Venus':

inter sē geminōs audēs committere cunnōs
mentīturque virum prōdigiōsa Venus.

('You dare to rub two cunts together
and your prodigious Venus pretends to be a man.')

In the Satires of Juvenal it is referred to euphemistically as a crista, 'crest' in this line (6.420), describing a lady's massage after an exercise session:

callidus et cristae digitōs inpressit aliptēs
ac summum dominae femur exclāmāre coēgit

('And the cunning masseur presses his fingers on her 'crest'
and causes the top of his mistress's thigh to cry aloud')

=== In the Romance languages ===
Landīca survived in Old French landie (extremely rare), and in Romanian lindic.

== Cūlus: the anus ==
The basic Latin word for the anus was cūlus. Though not very common, it occurs in both Catullus and Martial, and is productive in Romance. The word is of uncertain etymology, according to Adams.

=== Usage ===
In the texts cūlus appears to be used mainly of humans. It was associated with both defecation and with sex. Catullus (23) mocks a certain Furius with these words:

quod cūlus tibi pūrior salillō est
nec tōtō deciēs cacās in annō
atque id dūrius est fabā et lapillīs;
quod tū sī manibus terās fricēsque,
nōn umquam digitum inquināre possēs

('Because your arsehole is purer than a salt-cellar
and you don't shit even ten times in a whole year,
and the shit is harder than beans and pebbles;
which, if you were to rub it and crumble it with your hands,
you could never dirty your finger')

Martial (2.51) mocks a passive homosexual in these terms:

Ūnus saepe tibī tōtā dēnārius arcā
cum sit et hic cūlō trītior, Hylle, tuō,
nōn tamen hunc pistor, nōn auferet hunc tibi cōpō,
sed sī quis nimiō pēne superbus erit.
īnfēlīx venter spectat convīvia cūlī,
et semper miser hic ēsurit, ille vorat.

('Though you often have only one denarius in your whole money-chest,
Hyllus, and that rubbed smoother than your arsehole,
yet it's not the baker, nor the innkeeper, who will take that away from you,
but anyone who is proud of his over-sized penis.
Your unlucky stomach looks at the banquets of your arsehole,
and the former is always hungry, poor thing, while the latter devours.')

In a verse fable of Phaedrus, the word is used of dogs:

novum ut venīre quis videt cūlum olfacit

('Whenever (a dog) sees a new one coming, he smells its anus.')

=== Pōdex ===
The word pōdex was synonymous with cūlus, 'arsehole'. This word is thought to be an o-grade version of the same root as pēdere 'to fart', identifying it as the source of flatulence. Lewis and Short's Dictionary cites only two instances. In an unattractive picture of an old woman Horace (Epodes 8.6) writes:

hietque turpis inter āridās natīs
pōdex velut crūdae bovis.

('And (when) there gapes between your wrinkled buttocks
an ugly arsehole like that of a cow with diarrhoea.')

Juvenal (2.12), writing of outwardly virile but in practice effeminate philosophers, writes:

hispida membra quidem et dūrae per bracchia saetae
promittunt atrōcem animum, sed pōdice lēvī
caeduntur tumidae medicō ridente mariscae.

('Your hairy limbs and the tough bristles along your arms
promise a stern spirit, it's true, but from your smooth arsehole
swollen figs (i.e. piles) are cut out as the doctor laughs.')

The implication is that the piles have been caused by anal sex; that such anal piles or sores are caused by sex is a common theme in the poems of Martial.

Martial uses both pōdex and cūlus synonymously in the following poem (6.37):

sectī pōdicis usque ad umbilīcum
nūllās relliquiās habet Charīnus,
et prūrit tamen usque ad umbilīcum.
ō quantā scabiē miser labōrat!
cūlum nõn habet, est tamen cinaedus.

('Of his arsehole cut open right up to his navel
Charimus has no trace left;
and yet he itches right up to his navel.
O, under what great urges the poor man labours!
He has no anus, and yet he's still a fag!')

Pōdex seems to have been rather a rarer word than cūlus. It is not used by Catullus, and only twice by Martial. It is not found in Pompeii, and did not produce derivatives in vulgar Latin or in the Romance languages. The fact that it is used once by Juvenal (who avoided obscene vocabulary) shows that it was less offensive than cūlus. In later medical Latin, such as the 5th century Cassius Felix, it could be used as an alternative for ānus.

=== Ānus ===
Ānus (not to be confused with ănus 'an old woman') corresponds to the English derivative "anus". The word is metaphorical and originally meant "ring". Its anatomical sense drove out its other meanings, and for this reason the diminutive ānulus became the usual Latin name for a ring or circle.

The word is common in medical writings. In his book on agriculture, Columella describes how to treat a cow with stomach-ache:

sī dolor remanet, ungulās circumsecāre, et ūnctā manū per ānum īnsertā fimum extrahere

('If any pain remains, trim your nails, insert your oiled hand through its anus and extract the dung.')

It does not seem to have been regarded as an obscenity, and in his letter on different Latin obscene words, Cicero says:

'ānum' appellās aliēnō nōmine; cūr nōn suō potius? sī turpe est, nē aliēnō quidem; sī nōn est, suō potius.

('You call an 'anus' by a name not its own; why not use its own name? If it is something obscene, it should not be referred to even by another name; if it is not, it should be called by its own name.')

In the Latin Bible, the word is used for "haemorrhoids":

quīnque ānōs aureōs faciētis

('You shall make five golden haemorrhoids.')

In Phaedrus's fable of the dogs who are sent on an embassy to Jupiter, it is used as a synonym of cūlus, which occurs later in the same poem:

timentēs rūrsus aliquid nē simile accidat,
odōre canibus ānum, sed multō, replent.

('Fearing lest something similar might happen again,
they fill the dogs' anus with perfume, and a lot of it.')

An example of the usage of "ring" as a metaphor in a modern Romance language can be found in Brazilian Portuguese slang, in which the word anel can have the same double meaning, especially in the expression o anel de couro (the leather ring). "Ring" is also British slang for "anus".

=== Buttocks ===
A more seemly Latin word for the backside was clūnēs (singular clūnis) 'buttocks'; this word was generally more decent than cūlus, and older, as well: it has several Indo-European cognates. It can be used for the rump of animals as well as humans, and even birds. The word is usually plural but sometimes singular. In the same satire quoted above Juvenal (2.20–21) speaks scathingly of philosophers who have double standards, preaching about virtue but practising vice:

dē virtūte locūtī
clūnem agitant. 'ego tē cēventem, Sexte, verēbor?'

('They speak of virtue
but waggle their rump. Am I going to respect you, Sextus, when you behave in such a camp way?')

Another word for buttocks, slightly less common, was natēs, which is generally used only of the buttocks of humans. It seems to have been a more vulgar or colloquial word than clūnēs. In one of the Priapeia epigrams (22, in some editions 21) the god Priapus threatens potential thieves with punishment as follows:

fēmina sī fūrtum mihi faciet virve puerve
haec cunnum, caput hic praebeat, ille natēs.

('If any woman steals (from my garden) or a man or a boy,
the first must provide her cunt, the second his head, the third his buttocks.')

Another word for the backside is pūga (from the Greek πυγή 'buttock(s), backside'. This occurs in Horace's famously obscene Satire 1.2.133, where he describes his fear of having to make a quick escape from a woman's bedroom on the unexpected arrival of her husband:

nē nummī pereant aut pūga aut dēnique fāma

('to save my cash, my ass, and my good name')

From the same satire comes the word dēpūgis 'with no ass', in a line where Horace describes an unattractive woman:

dēpūgis, nāsūta, brevī latere ac pede longō est

('she's got no ass, but a big nose, a short body but lanky legs')

=== In the Romance languages ===
Cūlus has been preserved as meaning the buttocks (rather than the anus) in most Romance languages except for Portuguese, which kept the original semantics. It yields the forms culo in Spanish and Italian; in French and Catalan it becomes cul, in Romanian cur, in Vegliot Dalmatian čol, in Sardinian and Sicilian culu, in Portuguese cu and in Galician cu. Its offensiveness varies from one language to another; in French it was incorporated into ordinary words and expressions such as culottes, 'breeches', and cul-de-sac.

== Futuere: to fuck ==
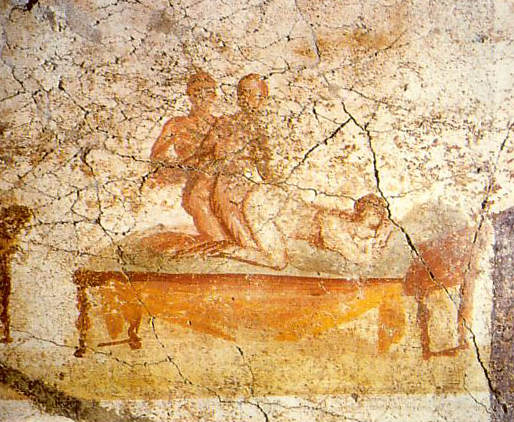
Decorative scene in the baths. Some scholars suggest that this is what was meant by a prōtēlum ('team of three').

Futuō, infinitive futuere, perfect futuī, supine futūtum, Latin for "to fuck", is richly attested in all its forms in Latin literature. The etymology is "obscure". It may be related to refūtō "repel, rebut" and cōnfūtō, "suppress" or "beat down", and come from a root meaning "beat".

In one poem (10.81.1) Martial writes, using the supine:

cum duo vēnissent ad Phyllida māne futūtum...

('When two men came one morning to Phyllis to fuck her...')

Horace, in Satire 1.2.127, explains why it is better to have sex with a courtesan rather than a married woman:

nec metuō, nē, dum futuō, vir rūre recurrat

('and I've no need to fear that, while I'm fucking her, her husband might come back unexpectedly from the country')

Not only the word itself, but also derived words such as dēfutūta, 'fucked out, exhausted from sex' (Catullus 41), diffutūta (Catullus 29, same meaning), and cōnfutuere 'to have sex with' (Catullus 37) are attested in Classical Latin literature. The derived noun futūtiō, 'act of intercourse', also exists in Classical Latin, and the nomen agentis futūtor, which corresponds to the English epithet "fucker", but lacking the derogatory tone of the English word. The god Priapus says in one poem (Priapeia 63):

ad hanc puella – paene nōmen adiēcī –
solet venīre cum suō futūtōre

('To this (p....) of mine, a girl – I almost added the name –
is accustomed to come with her boyfriend')

It is also used metaphorically in Catullus 6, which speaks of latera ecfutūta, funds exhausted, literally 'sides fucked away'.

Futuō, unlike the English word "fuck", was more frequently used in erotic and celebratory senses rather than derogatory ones or insults. A woman of Pompeii wrote the graffito futūta sum hīc ('I got laid here') and prostitutes, canny at marketing, appear to have written other graffiti complimenting their customers for their sexual prowess:

Fēlīx bene futuis

('Lucky boy, you fuck well');

Victor bene valeās quī bene futuis

('Victorious, best wishes to one who fucks well').

It is famously used in Catullus 32:

sed domī maneās parēsque nōbīs
novem continuās futūtiōnēs.

('but you remain at home and prepare for us
nine acts of fucking, one after the other.')

Futuō in its active voice was used of women only when it was imagined that they were taking the active role thought appropriate to the male partner by the Romans. The woman in Martial 7.70 is described as a tribas, a lesbian.

ipsārum tribadum tribas, Philaeni
rēctē, quam futuis, vocās amīcam

('Lesbian of all lesbians, Philaenis,
you are right to call the woman you fuck, your "girlfriend".')

Other more neutral synonyms for futuō in Latin include ineō, inīre, literally "to enter", as in this sentence from Suetonius, supposedly from a letter written by Mark Antony (lover of Queen Cleopatra) to his brother-in-law Octavian (later to become the Emperor Augustus):

quid tē mūtāvit? quia rēgīnam ineō? ... tū deinde sōlam Drūsillam inīs?

('What has changed you? Is it because I'm sleeping with the queen? ... So is Drusilla the only woman you sleep with?')

The word coeō, coīre, literally 'to go with', whence Latin and English coitus, is also used euphemistically for sexual intercourse, but it is not exactly a synonym for futuere. It can be used for both men and women, and also of animals and birds.

Another word found on Pompeian inscriptions was c(h)alāre, which appears to be a borrowing from the Greek χαλάω (khaláō) "loosen". A Pompeian inscription says Dionysius quā horā vult licet chalāre ('Dionysius is allowed to fuck whenever he wants to'). The Latin word laxāre appears to be used in the same sense in Priapeia 31: haec meī tē ventris arma laxābunt ('these weapons of my belly will relax you' (of pēdīcātiō).

Adams (1982) lists a large number of other euphemisms for the sexual act, such as this one from Juvenal (6.126):

ac resupīna iacēns cūnctōrum absorbuit ictūs

('And lying on her back she absorbed the blows of all and sundry')

=== In the Romance languages ===
Futuō, a core item of the lexicon, lives on in most of the Romance languages, sometimes with its sense somewhat weakened: Catalan fotre, French foutre, Spanish joder, Portuguese foder, Galician foder, Romanian fute (futere), Italian fottere. A famous ribald song in Old Occitan sometimes attributed to the troubadour William IX of Aquitaine reads:

Tant las fotei com auziretz:
Cen e quatre vint et ueit vetz,
Q'a pauc no-i rompei mos corretz
E mos arnes

('I fucked them as much as you will hear:
a hundred and eighty-eight times.
I most nearly broke my equipment
-- and my tool.')

== Pēdīcāre: to sodomise ==
The aggressive sense of English "fuck" and "screw" was not strongly attached to futuō in Latin. Instead, these aggressive connotations attached themselves to pēdīcāre 'to sodomise' and irrumāre 'to force fellatio' respectively, which were used with mock hostility in Catullus 16:

Pēdīcābō ego vōs et irrumābō,
Aurēlī pathice et cinaede Fūrī,
quī mē ex versiculīs meīs putāstis,
quod sunt molliculī, parum pudīcum.

('I will bugger and facefuck you,
pervert Aurelius and faggot Furius,
since you thought me indecent
because my poems are somewhat sissified.')

The passive voice, pēdīcārī, is used of the person who is forced to submit to anal sex, as in Priapeia 35, in which the god Priapus threatens a thief:

pēdīcābere, fūr, semel; sed īdem
sī dēprēnsus eris bis, irrumābō.

('You will be buggered, thief, on the first offence; but if
you are caught a second time, I will stick it in your mouth.')

The verb pēdīcāre could also be used of having anal sex with women, as in the following lines from Martial (11.104.17–18) (in the poem he claims to be speaking to his wife):

pēdīcāre negās: dabat hoc Cornēlia Gracchō,
Iūlia Pompeiō, Porcia, Brūte, tibī;

('You refuse to let me have anal sex with you: but Cornelia granted this to Gracchus, Julia to Pompey, and Porcia, Brutus, to you.')

There is some doubt in the dictionaries whether the correct spelling was ped- or paed- (Lewis and Short give the latter). Bücheler (1915, p. 105) argues that ped- is correct on the basis of the following epigram in the Priapeia (no. 67):

PĒnelopēs prīmam DĪdōnis prīma sequātur
et prīmam CAdmi syllaba prīma REmī,
quodque fit ex illīs, mihi tū dēprēnsus in hortō,
fūr, dabis: hāc poenā culpa luenda tua est.

('Let the first syllable of 'Penelope' be followed by the first of 'Dido',
and the first of 'Cadmus' by the first of 'Remus',
and what comes out of them is what you will pay to me if you are caught in the garden,
thief; it is with this penalty you must pay for your crime.')

=== Pēdīcātor and pēdīco (noun) ===
The word pēdīcātor ('buggerer') is used in a poem by Catullus's friend the orator Licinius Calvus quoted by Suetonius (Caesar 49), in which the King of Bithynia is referred to as pēdīcātor Caesaris ('the buggerer of Caesar'), referring to a rumour that in his youth Julius Caesar had had an affair with king Nicomedes.

Martial, in contrast, preferred to use the shorter form pēdīcō or pēdīco, of the same meaning, for example at 11.87:

dīves erās quondam: sed tunc pēdīco fuistī
et tibi nūlla diū fēmina nōta fuit.
nunc sectāris anūs. ō quantum cōgit egestās!
illa futūtōrem tē, Charidēme, facit.

('Once you were rich; but in those days you were a pēdīco,
and for a long time no woman was known to you.
Now you chase after old women. O the things that poverty forces one to do!
That woman is making a fucker out of you, Charidemus!')

The activities of a pēdīco are hinted at in the following lines of Martial (12.85):

pēdīcōnibus ōs olēre dīcis.
hoc sī, sīcut ais, Fabulle, vērum est:
quid tu crēdis olēre cunnilingīs?

('You say that buggerers' mouths stink.
If this is true as you say, Fabullus,
what do you think the mouth of pussy-lickers smells of?')

The various distinctions in sexual activity are made clear in the following poem of Martial (2.28):

rīdētō multum quī tē, Sextille, cinaedum
dīxerit et digitum porrigitō medium.
sed nec pēdīco es nec tū, Sextille, futūtor,
calda Vetustīnae nec tibi bucca placet.
ex istīs nihil es fateor, Sextille: quid ergō es?
nescio, sed tū scīs rēs superesse duās.

('Laugh a lot, Sextillus, if anyone calls you effeminate (cinaedus),
and show him your middle finger;
but you're also neither a buggerer (pēdīco) nor a fucker (futūtor),
nor does the hot mouth of Vetustina please you.
You're none of those, I admit, Sextillus, so what are you?
I don't know, but you know there are only two other possibilities!')

The fourth line rules out Sextillus as an irrumātor; the two remaining possibilities were in Roman eyes the most degrading, that he was either a cunnilingus or a fellātor.

=== Etymology ===
Pēdīcāre is often thought to be a Greek loanword in Latin (from the noun παιδικά (paidika) 'boyfriend'), but the long "i" is an obstacle. Bücheler (1915, p. 105), who rejects this etymology, suggests there may be a connection to pōdex and pēdō.

=== In Romance ===
Unlike futuō, the word pēdīcō has no reflexes in Romance. The French slang word pédé ('male homosexual') is an abbreviated form of pédéraste, according to the Dictionnaire historique de la langue française.

== Irrumāre and fellāre: oral sex ==
=== Irrumāre: to make suck ===
Irrumāre, which in English is denoted by the passive construction "to be sucked", is an active verb in Latin, since the irrumātor was considered to be the active partner, the fellātor the passive. Irrumātio is the counterpart of fellātio; in Roman terms, which are the opposite way round to modern conceptions, the giver of oral sex inserts his penis into the mouth of the receiver.

To be forced to submit to oral sex was apparently a worse punishment than to be sodomised. Martial (2.47) advises one effeminate man who is having an adulterous affair, and who would not perhaps have objected too much if the husband punished him by sodomising him:

cōnfīdīs natibus? non est pēdīco marītus;
quae faciat duo sunt: irrumat aut futuit.

('Do you rely on your buttocks (to avoid a worse punishment)? Your girlfriend's husband is not a sodomiser.
He does two things only: puts it in your mouth or screws women.')

According to Adams (1982, p. 126-7), it was a standard joke to speak of irrumātio as a means of silencing someone. Martial (3.96) writes:

garris quasi moechus et futūtor;
sī tē prendero, Gargilī, tacēbis.

('You gossip like an adulterer and a womaniser;
but if I catch you, Gargilius, you will be quiet!')

Irrumātio was seen as a hostile act that enemies might inflict on one. An inscription says:

mālim mē amīcī fellent quam inimīcī irrument

('I would prefer my friends to suck me than that my enemies make me suck them.')

It is also a standard threat made by the god Priapus, protector of orchards, to potential adult male thieves, as in Priapeia 13:

percīdēre, puer, moneō: futuēre, puella:
barbātum fūrem tertia poena manet

('You will be thoroughly "cut", boy, I warn you; girl, you will be fucked;
for the bearded thief, a third penalty awaits.')

=== Fellāre: to suck ===
The word fellāre originally had an innocent sense, meaning to suck the teat or to suck milk, but in classical times the sexual sense was predominant. The verb fellō and the nouns fellātor and (less often) the feminine fellātrīx are common in graffiti, and the first two also occur several times in Martial's epigrams. The practice was thought particularly degrading for a man, and Martial, mocking a certain masculine lesbian, writes (7.67):

nōn fellat – putat hoc parum virīle –
sed plānē mediās vorat puellās

('She does not suck cocks – she thinks this not masculine enough –
but absolutely devours the middle parts of girls.')

Fellō was generally used absolutely, without an object. A Pompeian wall inscription says Murtis bene felas ('Myrtis, you suck well'), and another says Romula cum suo hic fellat et ubique ('Romula does fellatio with her boyfriend here and everywhere').

A possible obscene innuendo of fellation with a boy has been seen in the following line of Virgil (Eclogues, 2.34), in which the shepherd Corydon is trying to seduce a handsome boy Alexis by offering to teach him to play the pipes:

nec tē paeniteat calamō trīvisse labellum

('You will not regret having bruised your lip on my flute').

Fellō leaves little trace in Romance languages, being replaced by sūgere ('to suck') and its derivatives. Though it is not represented by descendants, it is represented by learned borrowings such as the French fellation.

=== Lingere and lambere: to lick ===
The verb lingere ('to lick') was common in both sexual and non-sexual contexts. As a sexual term, it could have cūlum, mentulam, or cunnum as its object. Martial (3.96) writes:

lingis, non futuis, meam puellam
et garris quasi moechus et futūtor.
sī tē prendero, Gargilī, tacēbis.

('You lick my girlfriend, you don't fuck her;
and you boast about it as if you were an adulterer and a fucker.
But if I catch you, Gargilius, you'll shut up!')

Its synonym lambere was also sometimes used in a sexual sense. Martial (3.81) criticises a eunuch who presumed to have oral sex with women:

haec dēbet mediōs lambere lingua virōs

('That tongue of yours ought to be licking the middle parts of men (not women)')

=== Glūbere: 'to peel' ===
Glūbere 'to take the bark off', 'peel' and dēglūbere 'to take the husk off', 'to skin, flay' are famously used in a sexual sense in two places in Latin literature by Catullus and Ausonius. It has been argued that the meaning is to pull back a man's foreskin, in order to masturbate or fellate him. Ausonius (Ep. 71), after mentioning various perversions (obscēnās venerēs), says:

Crispa tamen cūnctās exercet corpore in ūnō
dēglūbit, fellat, mōlītur per utramque cavernam,
nē quid inexpertum frūstrā moritūra relinquat

('Crispa, however, practices all the perversions in one body:
she "peels", she sucks, she puts it in either hole,
lest she leave anything untried before she dies.')

What seems to shock Ausonius is that Crispa actively enjoyed taking an active role in such practices rather than passively submitting to male desires as was the norm.

The other sexual use of this word is in Catullus (57), who says in a moment of bitterness:

Caelī, Lesbia nostra, Lesbia illa,
illa Lesbia, quam Catullus ūnam
plūs quam sē atque suōs amāvit omnēs,
nunc in quadriviīs et angiportīs
glūbit magnanimī Remī nepōtēs.

('Caelius, our Lesbia, that Lesbia,
that one woman whom Catullus
loved more than himself and all his dear ones
now on crossroads and in alleys
"peels" the grandsons of magnanimous Remus.')

Some, noting that in Italian the phrases cavar la pelle, scorticare ('debark') can mean 'strip someone of their money', and similar uses of tondēre ('to shear') and dēglūbere ('to skin') in Latin, have argued that Catullus is also using the word in a non-sexual sense; that is, Lesbia is acting like a prostitute and fleecing the spendthrift Roman young men (nepōtēs) of their money.

== Cēvēre and crīsāre: to waggle ==
Cēveō (cēvēre, cēvī) and crīsō (crīsāre etc.) are basic Latin obscenities that have no exact English equivalents. Crīsō referred to the actions of the female partner in sexual intercourse (i.e. grinding or riding on a penis); as, similarly to the case in English, futuō, which is often translated 'fuck', primarily referred to the male action (i.e. thrusting, pounding). Cēveō referred to the similar activity of the passive partner in anal sex.

=== Etymology ===
Both of these verbs are of fairly obscure origin.

Unlike some of the vocabulary of homosexuality in Latin (pathicus, cinaedus), cēveō seems not to be of Greek origin. Francis A. Wood relates it to an Indo-European root *k^{w}eu- or *qeu-, relating to a variety of back and forth motions.

=== Usage ===
Cēveō always refers to a male taking the bottom role in anal sex. Martial 3.95 contains the phrase:

sed pēdīcāris, sed pulchrē, Naevole, cēvēs.

('But you get buggered and you wiggle your arse so prettily, Naevolus.')

Crīsō appears to have had a similar meaning, but to have been used of the female. Martial writes of a Spanish dancing-girl (who he suggests would make a suitable present for someone):

tam tremulum crīsat, tam blandum prūrit, ut ipsum
masturbātōrem fēcerit Hippolytum

('She waggles so tremulously, she arouses so charmingly, that she has made Hippolytus himself into a masturbator')

Again Martial 10.68:

numquid, cum crīsās, blandior esse potes?
tū licet ēdiscās tōtam referāsque Corinthon,
nōn tamen omnīnō, Laelia, Lāis eris.

('Could you possibly be prettier as you grind? You learn easily, and could do everything they do in Corinth; but you'll never quite be Lais, Laelia.')

Lais was a famous prostitute or courtesan, and Corinth was the site of a major temple of Aphrodite, which employed more than a thousand cult prostitutes.

=== Synonyms and metaphors ===
These words have few synonyms or metaphors, and belong almost to a sort of technical vocabulary.

=== In the Romance languages ===
Both words seem to have been lost in Romance.

== Masturbārī: to masturbate ==
This word is found twice in the poet Martial, but apparently not in earlier writers. Martial writes in one poem (11.104):

masturbābantur Phrygiī post ōstia servī,
Hectoreō quotiēns sēderat uxor equō

('The Phrygian slaves used to masturbate behind the doors
whenever Hector's wife sat on her husband's "horse".')

The word masturbātor also occurs. In 14.203 Martial writes of a Spanish girl from Gādēs (Cádiz):

tam tremulum crīsat, tam blandum prūrit, ut ipsum
masturbātōrem fēcerit Hippolytum.

('She wiggles so sexily and itches for it so charmingly
that she would have made a masturbator out of Hippolytus himself!')

Hippolytus was famous in mythology for his chastity, and for refusing the advances of his stepmother, Phaedra.

=== Etymology ===
Lewis and Short suggest that the word masturbārī may be derived from manū stuprārī 'to defile oneself with a hand', and this is the usual view, and supported ("with some hesitation") by J.N. Adams. Another view, however, is that it comes from *mās + turbāre ('to excite the penis'), assuming an otherwise unattested meaning of "penis" for mās ('male'). The supporters of this view cite another word mascarpiōnem (from mascarpiō), which occurs once in Latin literature in Petronius (134.5), and which appears from the context to mean 'beating the penis with a wand (to stimulate it)'. It is argued that in this word, the element mās- may be the same as in masturbārī. Yet another proposed etymology is that the element masturb- derives from a Proto-Indo-European root *mostrgh- meaning 'brain, marrow', and hence 'semen'.

=== Synonyms and euphemisms ===
Martial (9.41) criticises a Roman gentleman for masturbating, using the phrase:

paelice laevā ūteris et Venerī servit amīca manus

('You use your left hand as a concubine and your hand serves Venus as your girlfriend')

The hand used for masturbating by the Romans was evidently the left one, as Martial 11.73 confirms. (Compare also the fragment of the satirist Lucilius quoted above in the section on mūtō.)

In another poem (11.22) Martial advises a friend:

inguina saltem parce futūtrīcī sollicitāre manū

('Do at least cease from troubling your groins with copulating hand').

He continues:

lēvibus in puerīs plūs haec quam mentula peccat
et faciunt digitī praecipitantque virum

('In smooth-skinned boys this (i.e their hand) sins more than their cock,
and their fingers hasten the process of turning them into a man.')

This apparently dates back to a belief of Aristotle that vigorous sexual activity caused a boy's voice to turn rapidly into that of a man.

In another poem (2.43), however, Martial admits that he himself for want of a sexual partner sometimes resorts to the practice:

at mihi succurrit prō Ganymēde manus

("but as for me, my hand has to serve instead of Ganymede").

In another (11.46), addressed to a man who finds it difficult in middle age to get an erection, Martial uses the word trūdō ('I shove' or 'prod') to signify masturbation:

trūditur et digitīs pannūcea mentula lassīs
nec levat extīnctum sollicitāta caput

('and your shrivelled dick is prodded by your fingers until they get tired,
but doesn't raise its worn out head even when provoked').

The frequentative form of trūdō is trūsāre ('to thrust or shove repeatedly'). This occurs in only one place, in Catullus 56:

dēprendī modo pūpulum puellae
trūsantem: hunc ego, sī placet Diōnae,
prō tēlō rigidā meā cecīdī.

('Recently I caught the ward of my girlfriend
"thrusting"; this boy, if it please Dione,
using my "hard one" as a weapon, I "cut".')

The meaning of trūsantem here is disputed. 'Masturbating' was the interpretation of A. E. Housman; he also wanted to read prō tēlō as prōtēlō with the meaning 'there and then'. Others, however, understand Catullus to mean that the boy was caught having sex with a girl; in which case, prōtēlō probably means 'in a threesome', since a prōtēlum, according to the agricultural writer Cato the Elder, was a team of three oxen pulling a plough. Uden (2007) translates: 'I just caught a kid banging his girlfriend', explaining that pūpulum is a derogatory diminutive.

The verb caedere (literally 'to cut' or 'to kill') is used as slang for homosexual penetration elsewhere in Latin literature, such as at Priapeia 26.10, a poem in which Priapus boasts that in his earlier days solēbam fūrēs caedere quamlibet valentēs ('I used to 'cut' (i.e. sodomise) thieves, however strong they were'). Dione, was the mother of Aphrodite (Venus), goddess of love; but the term was also used in poetry for Venus herself.

== Cacāre: to defecate ==
Cacō, cacāre was the chief Latin word for defecation.

=== Etymology ===
The word has a distinguished Indo-European parentage, which may perhaps relate to nursery words or children's slang that tends to recur across many different cultures. It would appear to be cognate with the Greek noun κοπρος, kopros, meaning "excrement" (hence, coprophilia). It also exists in Germanic; in German, Swedish (kack), Scots (as both noun and verb, cack or cackie, the diminutive), whilst English "poppiecock" derives from Dutch pappe kak, 'diarrhea'. It exists in Turkish (kaka), Irish and Scottish Gaelic (cac), Hebrew, Arabic dialects, Hungarian (kaka), Ukrainian (какати), Russian, Lithuanian and Persian/Isfahani accent (keke). In British English, "caca" is occasionally used as childish slang for excrement (similar to American English "poop"), a word whose level of obscene loading varies from country to country; whilst in Scotland and in Ireland, "cack" is occasionally used either as a mild interjection, or as an impolite adjective to mean of poor quality, broken, nonsense. It also exists as a loan in Finnish (kakka). The derivatives of this Latin word appear in Spanish, Catalan, Portuguese, Italian (cacca), Romanian, and French. Also, in Serbian: kakati 'to poop'.

=== Usage ===
The verb is usually used intransitively. Martial (1.92.11) says:

non cūlum, neque enim est cūlus, quī non cacat ōlim

('not your arsehole, for something that never shits isn't an arsehole')

However, in the phrase below, from Catullus 36, it is transitive:

Annālēs Volusī, cacāta carta

('Volusius's Annals, paper covered in shit')

The prefixed form concacāre is transitive. Seneca describes the Emperor Claudius's final words, spoken after farting loudly:

ultima vōx eius haec inter hominēs audīta est, cum maiōrem sonitum ēmīsisset illā parte, quā facilius loquēbātur: "vae mē, puto, concacāvī mē!" quod an fēcerit, nescio: omnia certē concacāvit.

('His last saying heard among mortals was the following, after he had let out a rather loud sound from that part with which he spoke more easily: "O no, I think I've shat myself!" Whether he did or not, I don't know. He certainly shat on everything else.')

=== Synonyms and metaphors ===
Few synonyms are attested in Classical Latin, apart from a word cunīre, attested by the grammarian Festus (but nowhere else) in the meaning stercus facere. The word dēfēcāre comes much later.

A euphemism which occurs in Petronius (116) is suā rē causā facere:

habuimus ... et pānem autopȳrum de suō sibī, quem ego mālō quam candidum; <nam> et vīrēs facit, et cum meā rē causā faciō, nōn plōrō
('We also had whole-wheat bread, which I prefer to white, since it gives you strength and also when I relieve myself, I don't feel pain.')

The same euphemism is used in Petronius of relieving oneself of gas (see below).

=== In the Romance languages ===
Cacāre is preserved unaltered in Sardinian and the southern Italian dialects, and with little alteration in Italian (cagare). It becomes Galician, Catalan, Spanish, and Portuguese cagar, in Vegliot Dalmatian kakuor, in French chier, and in Romanian as căcare (the act of taking a dump) or a (se) căca. (Feces are referred to as caca in French, Catalan, Romanian (besides căcat) and Spanish childhood slang, while Portuguese and Romanian use the very same word with the general meaning of anything that looks or smells malodorous or reminiscent of excrement.) German kacken, Dutch kakken, Czech kakat, Lithuanian kakoti, Russian какать (kakat'), Icelandic kúka, Bosnian kakiti etc. are all slang words meaning 'to defecate', most of them having roughly the same level of severity as the English expression 'take a dump'.

== Merda: feces ==
Merda is the basic Latin word for excrement. Frequently used, it appears in most of the Romance languages.

=== Etymology ===
Merda represents Indo-European *s-merd-, whose root sense was likely 'something malodorous'. It is cognate with German Mist (dung), Lithuanian smirdė́ti ('to stink'), Russian смерде́ть (smerdét, 'to stink') and Polish śmierdzieć ('to stink').

=== Usage ===
The word merda is attested in classical texts mostly in veterinary and agricultural contexts, meaning 'manure'. Cato the Elder uses it, as well as stercus, while the Mulomedicina Chironis speaks of merda būbula, 'cattle manure'.

Unlike the English word "shit", merda could be both singular and plural. In Horace (Satires 1.8.37), a talking statue of Priapus says:

mentior at sīquid, merdīs caput inquiner albīs
corvōrum atque in me veniat mictum atque cacātum
Iūlius, et fragilis Pediātia, fūrque Vorānus.

('But if I'm telling a lie, may my head be spattered with the white droppings
of ravens, and may Julius, delicate Pediatia, and the thief Voranus
come to piss and shit on me!')

In one of his verse fables (4.18.25), Phaedrus speaks of some dogs who have had their backsides deodorised with perfume. But on hearing thunder,

repente odōrem mixtum cum merdīs cacant

('Suddenly they shit out the perfume mixed with turds')

The word can also be used in a metaphorical sense, as at Martial 3.17, speaking of a pastry which had been blown on by a man with impure breath (caused no doubt by oral sex) to cool it down:

sed nēmō potuit tangere: "merda" fuit.

('But nobody could touch it: it was a piece of "shit".')

=== Synonyms and metaphors ===
The politer terms for merda in Classical Latin were stercus (gen. stercoris), 'manure' and fimum or fimus, 'filth'. Stercus was used frequently in the Vulgate, as in its well-known translation of Psalm 112:7: (Psalm 113:7 in the KJV.)

Suscitāns ā terrā inopem, et dē stercore ērigēns pauperem.

('Raising up the needy from the earth : and lifting up the poor out of the dunghill.' DRC)

In Classical Latin, faex, plural faecēs, meant the dregs, such as are found in a bottle of wine; the word did not acquire the sense of feces until later.

=== In the Romance languages ===
Merda is productive in the Romance languages, and is the etymon of French merde, Spanish mierda, and in Vegliot Dalmatian miarda. It is preserved unaltered in Catalan, Galician, Italian, Portuguese, and Sardinian. It was preserved in Romanian too, not for feces, where căcat (derived from caco) is used instead, but in the word dezmierda, originally meaning 'to wipe the bottom of (an infant)'; subsequently becoming 'to cuddle' or 'to fondle'.

== Pēdere and vissīre: passing wind ==
=== Pēdere ===
Pēdō, pēdere, pepēdī, pēditum is the basic Latin word for passing intestinal wind. In the Sermones 1.8, 46, Horace writes:

nam, displōsa sonat quantum vēsīca, pepēdī
diffissā nate fīcus...

Christopher Smart translates this passage as 'from my cleft bum of fig-tree I let out a fart, which made as great an explosion as a burst bladder'. The "I" of this satire is the god Priapus, and Smart explains that he was made of fig-tree wood which split through being poorly prepared.

Martial also uses the word several times, including the following (10.15):

nīl aliud videō, quō tē crēdāmus amīcum,
quam quod mē cōram pēdere, Crispe, solēs.

('I don't see any other reason why I should believe you a friend,
other than that you are in the habit of farting in front of me, Crispus.')

A word oppēdere ('to fart in the face of, mock') is used in Horace (Sat. 1.9.70).

Catullus also uses the noun pēditum in one of his poems (54).

=== Vissīre ===
A rarer word, meaning 'to fart silently', was vissīre. This is hinted at in Cicero's letter ad Fam. 9.22, where he says that the word divīsiō is potentially obscene, in the same way as the word intercapēdō. The word is not recorded in Lewis and Short's Latin Dictionary and does not appear to have been used by any extant author. However, the Oxford Latin Dictionary quotes an inscription from a public bath in Ostia which says

vissīre tacitē Chīlōn docuit subdolus

('cunning Chilon taught how to fart silently').

Judging from derivatives in some of the daughter languages (see below), there was also a noun *vissīna 'a silent fart', but no trace of this is found in the extant texts.

=== Crepāre ===
The noise made by escaping flatulence was usually called crepitus, a word which could refer to a noise of various kinds, and the verb crepāre was used of breaking wind noisily. Martial writes of a certain man, who after an embarrassing incident of flatulence when praying in the temple of Jupiter, was careful in the future to take precautions:

cum vult in Capitōlium venīre,
sellās ante petit Patercliānās
et pēdit deciēsque vīciēsque.
sed quamvīs sibi cāverit crepandō,
compressīs natibus Iovem salūtat.

('Whenever he wants to come to the Capitolium (to pray)
he first heads for the toilets of Paterclus
and farts ten or twenty times.
But however much he takes precautions by breaking wind,
he still salutes Jupiter with clenched buttocks.')

=== Euphemisms ===
In Petronius (47), in the speech of the vulgar millionaire Trimalchio, euphemisms suā rē causā facere and facere quod sē iuvet 'do what helps one' are both used for relieving oneself of wind:

itaque sī quis vestrum voluerit suā rē causā facere, nōn est quod illum pudeātur. ... ego nūllum putō tam magnum tormentum esse quam continēre ... nec tamen in triclīniō ullum vetuō facere quod sē iuvet, et medicī vetant continēre.

('And so if any of you wants to relieve himself (of wind), there's no need for him to be ashamed. Personally I think there's nothing worse than holding it in. And I never forbid anyone to relieve himself of wind even in the dining-room, and doctors forbid people to hold it in as well.')

=== Etymology ===
The antiquity of pēdō and its membership in the core inherited vocabulary is clear from its reduplicating perfect stem. It is cognate with Greek πέρδομαι (perdomai), English fart, Bulgarian prdi, Polish pierdzieć, Russian пердеть (perdet), Lithuanian persti, Sanskrit pardate, and Avestan pərəδaiti, all of which mean the same thing.

Vissīre is clearly onomatopoeic. The Old Norse fisa may be compared, although the correspondence in sounds is not exact.

=== In the Romance languages and English ===
Pēdere and pēditum survive in Romance. In French, the noun pet from pēditum and the derived verb péter (for earlier poire from pēdere) are very much alive. In Catalan, the verb is petar-se and the noun is pet. In Spanish the noun pedo as well as the verbs peerse and pedorrear are similarly derived. Portuguese peido and peidar(-se), (-dei) and Galician peido and peidar(se) are related. Italian peto is less common than scorreggia and its derived verb scorreggiare, but in Neapolitan pireto is frequently used.

The English word "petard", found mostly in the cliché "hoist with his own petard", comes from an early explosive device, the noise of which was likened to that of farting. English also has "petomania" for a musical performance of breaking intestinal wind, and "petomane" for the performer, after Le Pétomane, a French performer active in the early 20th century.

Vissīre, though rare in Latin texts, has derivates in several Romance languages, such as Romanian bășí (verb) and bășínă (noun); French vesse (noun) and vesser (verb).

== Mingere and meiere: urination ==
Mingō (infinitive mingere) and meiō (infinitive meiere) are two variant forms of what is likely a single Latin verb meaning 'to urinate', or in more vulgar usage, 'to take a piss'. The two verbs share a perfect mixī or mīnxī, and a past participle mictum or mīnctum. It is likely that mingō represents a variant conjugation of meiō with a nasal infix.

In Classical Latin, the form mingō was more common than meiō. In some Late Latin texts a variant first conjugation form meiāre is attested. This is the form that is productive in Romance.

The Classical Latin word micturīre became the accepted medical word meaning 'to urinate'. It is the source of the English medical term "micturition reflex".

=== Usage ===
Martial's epigram 3.78 uses meiere and ūrīna to make a bilingual pun:

mīnxistī currente semel, Paulīne, carīnā.
meiere vīs iterum? iam 'Palinūrus' eris.

('You pissed once off the side of a boat, Paulinus.
Do you want to piss again? then you will be Palinurus.')

(Note that palin is a Greek word meaning 'once again'. Palinurus was Aeneas's helmsman who fell overboard in a storm in the Aeneid.)

The verbs meiere and mingere could also be used euphemistically of sexual intercourse. Horace (Satires 1.2.44), speaking of the punishments meted out to adulterers, says:

hunc permīnxērunt cālōnēs; quīn etiam illud
accidit, ut cuidam testīs caudamque salācem
dēmeterent ferrō.

('One got thoroughly 'pissed on' (i.e. raped) by the servants; it even
happened once that they cut off someone's balls and lecherous 'tail'
with a knife.')

Catullus (67.23) speaks of a father who 'pissed in the lap of his own son' (ipse suī gnātī mīnxerit in gremium), that is, had sex with his son's wife.

=== Urine ===
The most usual word for urine was ūrīna, which is attested in Latin as early as Cicero, and became the usual polite term. The relationship with the Greek verb οὐρέω (oureō), 'to urinate', is not clear. In Classical Latin, however, the verb ūrīnārī meant 'to dive into water', and ūrīnātor was 'a diver', ūrīnantēs 'those who dive'.

Catullus (37) writes contemptuously of a certain Spaniard who was one of the lovers of his girlfriend Lesbia:

tū praeter omnēs ūne de capillātīs,
cunīculōsae Celtiberiae fīlī,
Egnātī. opāca quem bonum facit barba
et dēns Hibērā dēfricātus ūrīnā.

('You above all, one of the long-haired ones,
son of rabbit-filled Celtiberia,
Egnatius, made handsome by your dark beard,
and your teeth brushed clean with Iberian piss.')

Another word for urine, but less commonly used, was lōtium. This word relates to lavāre, 'to wash'. The Romans, innocent of soap, collected urine as a source of ammonia to use in laundering clothes. The early agricultural writer Cato, an advocate of cabbage, used this word when he wrote (Res Rustica 156):

brassica alvum bonum facit lōtiumque

('Cabbage is good for the digestion and for the urine.')

=== Etymology ===
Meiere is an inherited Indo-European word. It relates to Sanskrit mehati, 'urinates', Persian mīz, 'urine', Lithuanian myža, 'he/she urinates', Greek ὀμείχειν (omeikhein), 'to urinate', which, taken together, point to an Indo-European *h_{3}meiģh-. This IE root with a palatal ģh was formerly mixed up (e. g. in Pokorny's IEW) with another one with velar *gh meaning 'mist' (Russian mgla), hence erroneous tentative overall translations like 'to sprinkle' or 'to wet' which still turn up sometimes.

=== In the Romance languages ===
Though mingere and meiere are the Classical Latin forms, meiāre seems to have been the popular form in Late Latin. This underlies Galician mexar, Portuguese mijar, and Spanish mear. *Pissiāre represents a borrowing from the Germanic languages, and appears elsewhere in the Romance territory, as in French pisser, Catalan pixar, Italian pisciare and Romanian a (se) pișa, along with English to piss.

== Latin words relating to prostitution ==
Compared to the anatomical frankness of the Roman vocabulary about sexual acts and body parts, the Roman vocabulary relating to prostitution seems euphemistic and metaphorical.

Prostitutes were called meretrīx, 'earner', and lupa, 'she-wolf'; a brothel was a lupānar; these words referred to the mercantile and perceived predatory activities of prostitutes. The Latin verb prōstō meant 'to be up for sale' and prōstituō meant 'to expose for public sale'.

The poet Juvenal (6.120-3) gives a satirical account of how the disgraced Empress Messalina used to enjoy playing the part of a prostitute in a brothel:

sed nigrum flāvō crīnem abscondente galērō
intrāvit calidum veterī centōne lupānar
et cellam vacuam atque suam; tunc nūda papillīs
prōstitit aurātīs titulum mentīta Lyciscae

('But hiding her black hair with a yellow wig,
wearing an old patchwork cloak, she entered the hot brothel
and an empty cell of her own; then she offered herself for sale nude
with her nipples covered in gold, using the false name of "Lycisca".')

The pimp or pander in charge of the brothel, who dismissed the girls at closing time, was called 'lēnō if male (Juvenal 6.127) and lēna if female.

The neuter word scortum could refer to either a male or female prostitute. This word may relate to Latin scorteus, 'made of leather or hide', much as English refers to the "skin trade". Lewis and Short quote Varro: pellem antīquī dīcēbant scortum ('in the old days people referred to skin as scortum').

Another word for a male prostitute, notably one who is no longer a boy, is exolētus (literally 'grown up, adult'). Cicero (pro Milone, 21, 55) writes:

Clōdius, quī semper sēcum scorta, semper exolētōs, semper lupās dūceret

('Clodius, who always used to take with him whores, and male and female prostitutes')

The verb 'scortor, scortārī, which occurs chiefly in Plautus, means 'to go whoring' or 'to employ prostitutes'. Plautus illustrates its use in his play Asinaria:

quandō mēcum pariter pōtant, pariter scortārī solent,
hanc quidem, quam nactus, praedam pariter cum illīs partiam.

('Whenever they go drinking with me, they also usually go whoring with me.
So I'll share this booty which I've captured with them equally.')

The important and productive words for a prostitute in Romance, *pūta or *pūtāna, are not attested in Classical Latin, despite their many Romance derivatives: French putain and pute, Italian puttana, Spanish, Filipino, Catalan, Portuguese and Galician puta. French linguists state that they relate to Latin pūteō, pūtēre, 'to stink', and thus represent yet another metaphor.. Spaniards María Moliner (author of a famous dictionary of Spanish) and Joan Coromines think they came from Vulgar Latin *putta, feminine form of *puttus, an emphatic form of pūtus, 'pure' or 'boy'. In Portugal, the word puto has the same connotation as 'small kid' or 'little boy'; in Brazil, on the other hand, it is slang for 'pissed off' or enraged males in general or as a colloquial, mildly offensive term for male escorts (more formally called prostitutos or michês) – the male counterpart of the slang puta, with the same meanings.

== In popular culture ==
The HBO/BBC2 original television series Rome depicts the city with the grit and grime that is often absent from earlier productions, including that of language. But since the actors speak English, Latin profanity is mostly seen in written graffiti, such as:

- ATIA FELLAT, 'Atia sucks'; fellatio is a noun derived from this verb.
- ATIA AMAT OMNES, 'Atia loves all [men]'. Thus calling her a whore or slut.
- CAESARI SERVILIA FUTATRIX 'Servilia is Caesar's bitch'. Graffito in HBO's Rome, episode 5 See fututor and fututrix.

== See also ==
- Vulgar Latin
- Sexuality in ancient Rome
- Homosexuality in ancient Rome

== Bibliography ==
Primary literary sources are discussed in the text. Many of the graffiti discussed are found in the Corpus Inscriptionum Latinarum.

- Adams, Douglas Q. (1985) "Latin Mas and Masturbari". Glotta, 63. Bd., 3./4. H. (1985), pp. 241–247.
- Adams, James N. (1981a). "A Type of Sexual Euphemism in Latin". Phoenix, Vol. 35, No. 2 (Summer, 1981), pp. 120–128. Published by: Classical Association of Canada.
- Adams, James N. (1981b). "Culus, Clunes and Their Synonyms in Latin". Glotta, 59. Bd., 3./4. H. (1981), pp. 231–264.
- Adams, James N. (1983). "Martial 2. 83". Classical Philology, Vol. 78, No. 4 (Oct., 1983), pp. 311–315. (A reply to Richlin (1981).)
- Adams, James N. (1990 [1982]). The Latin Sexual Vocabulary (Johns Hopkins, 1990 [1982]) ISBN 0-8018-2968-2. (Introduction.)
- (Anon.) (1868). The Index Expurgatorius of Martial, Literally Translated, Comprising All the Epigrams hitherto Omitted by English Translators. Believed to have been written by George Augustus Sala and Edward Sellon among others.
- Bain, David (1991). "Six Greek Verbs of Sexual Congress (βινω̑, κινω̑, πυγίζω, ληκω̑, οἴΦω, λαικάζω)"The Classical Quarterly, Vol. 41, No. 1 (1991), pp. 51–77.
- Beckelhymer, Samuel David (2014). The Way That Our Catullus Walked: Grammar and Poetry in the Late Republic. Publicly Accessible Penn Dissertations (Thesis). Archived from the original on 20 March 2017.
- Bücheler, Franz (1915). "Pedicare". Kleine Schriften, vol. 1, pp. 104–6. (in German)
- Currie, Bruno (1996). "A Note on Catullus 63.5". Classical Quarterly, Vol. 46, No. 2 (1996), pp. 579–581.
- Dutsch, Dorota and Ann Suter (ed.) (2015), Ancient Obscenities: Their Nature and Use in the Ancient Greek and Roman Worlds. Ann Arbor: University of Michigan Press. ISBN 9780472119646. Reviewed by Jeffrey Henderson Bryn Mawr Classical Review 2017.05.46.
- Fay, Edwin W. (1907) "Greek and Latin Word Studies". The Classical Quarterly, Vol. 1, No. 1 (Apr., 1907), pp. 13–30.
- Fisher, John (1976). The lexical affiliations of Vegliote (Fairleigh Dickinson University Press, 1976) ISBN 0-8386-7796-7
- Fontaine, Michael (2009). Funny Words in Plautine Comedy (Oxford University Press). ISBN 9780195341447
- Gellérfi, Gergő (2017). "Obscenity or Taboo? Remarks on Profanities in Juvenal and Martial". Graeco-Latina Brunensia 22 / 2017 / 2.
- Housman, A.E. (1930). "Draucus and Martial XI 8 1". The Classical Review, Vol. 44, No. 4 (Sep., 1930), pp. 114–116.
- Housman, A.E. (1931). Praefanda. Hermes, 66. Bd., H. 1 (Jan., 1931), pp. 402–412. (in Latin)
- Katz, Joshua, T. (1998). "Testimonia Ritus Italici: Male Genitalia, Solemn Declarations, and a New Latin Sound Law". Harvard Studies in Classical Philology, Vol. 98 (1998), pp. 183–217.
- Kokoszkiewicz, Konrad (2011). "Catullus 65.3: devolsit?. The Classical Quarterly, New Series, Vol. 61, No. 2 (December 2011), pp. 756–758.
- Messing, Gordon M. (1956) "The Etymology of Lat. Mentula". Classical Philology Vol. 51, No. 4 (Oct., 1956), pp. 247–249.
- Miller, P.A. (1998), "The Bodily Grotesque in Roman Satire: Images of Sterility". Arethusa 31.3 (1998) 257–283.
- Muse, Kevin (2009). "Fleecing Remus' Magnanimous Playboys: Wordplay in Catullus 58.5" Hermes, 137. Jahrg., H. 3 (2009), pp. 302–313.
- Penella, Robert J. (1976). A note on (De)glubere. Hermes, 104. Bd., H. 1 (1976), pp. 118–120.
- Richlin, Amy (1981). "The Meaning of Irrumare in Catullus and Martial". Classical Philology, Vol. 76, No. 1 (Jan., 1981), pp. 40–46.
- Sapsford, Francesca May (2012). The 'Epic' of Martial. University of Birmingham PhD thesis.
- Schultheiss, D., J.J. Mattelaer and F.M. Hodges (2003). "Preputial infibulation: from ancient medicine to modern genital piercing". BJU International 92(7):758-63, December 2003.
- Scott, William C. (1969). "Catullus and Cato (c. 56)". Classical Philology, Vol. 64, No. 1 (Jan., 1969), pp. 24–29. The University of Chicago Press.
- Smart, Christopher. Quinti Horatii Flacci Opera, with a literal translation into English Prose (London, Sampson Low, 1882)
- Sullivan, J. P. (1990). "Martial and English Poetry". Classical Antiquity Vol. 9, No. 1 (Apr., 1990), pp. 149-17.
- Taylor, Rabun (1997). "Two Pathic Subcultures in Ancient Rome". Journal of the History of Sexuality, Vol. 7, No. 3 (Jan., 1997), pp. 319–371.
- Tucker, T. G., Etymological Dictionary of Latin (Halle, 1931, repr. Ares Publishers, 1985) ISBN 0-89005-172-0
- Uden, James (2007). "Impersonating Priapus". The American Journal of Philology, Vol. 128, No. 1 (Spring, 2007), pp. 1-26.
- Varone, Antonio (2002). Erotica Pompeiana: Love Inscriptions on the Walls of Pompeii, trans. Ria P. Berg. (Rome) (Selected pages on Google books.)
- Watson, Lindsay C. (2005). "Catullan Recycling? Cacata carta". Mnemosyne, Fourth Series, Vol. 58, Fasc. 2 (2005), pp. 270–277.
- Wehrle, W. T. (2008). "Gurgulio at Persius 4.38". Symbolae Osloenses: Norwegian Journal of Greek and Latin Studies. 68 - Issue 1.
- Williams, Craig A. (2010), Roman Homosexuality. Second Edition (first published 1999). Oxford/New York: Oxford University Press, 2010. ISBN 9780195388749.
- Wood, Francis A. (1905) "The IE. Root '*Qeu'-: Nuere, Nutare, Cevere; Quatere, Cudere; Cubare, Incumbere. II" In Modern Philology, vol. 17, p. 567 ff. (Univ. Chicago, 1905)
- Wray, David (2001). "Attis' Groin Weights (Catullus 63.5)". Classical Philology, Vol. 96, No. 2 (Apr., 2001), pp. 120–126.
