= Portuguese profanity =

Socially offensive form of language

Foda-se esse verme e todos colonizadores (Fuck that worm and all colonizers) – Demerval Barbosa Moreira Square, Nova Friburgo, Rio de Janeiro, Brazil

Profanity in the Portuguese language – words and phrases considered vulgar, taboo, blasphemous, inflammatory or offensive – can be divided into several categories. A number of them are used as insults, and all express the utterer's annoyance. Considerable differences are found among varieties of Portuguese, such as those in Portugal and in Brazil.

== Overview ==
In the case of Brazil, several neologistic curse words were borrowed not only from Amerindian or African languages but also from Italian, German or French, due to the Italian and Central-European immigration to Brazil in the late 19th century and due to the fact French used to be a lingua franca for intellectual Brazilians and Brazilian international diplomacy in the past. While the Spanish language abounds in blasphemous interjections, Portuguese lacks in this regard.

Scatological and sexual terms, which are both the most common source of swearing, are used either with negative or positive meaning, depending on the context in which they are used (e.g: "foda" may be used in "caralho que foda" which means "bad-ass" but being very vulgar and maybe more appropriately translated as "fucking bad-ass" but it may also be used to indicate something is difficult "é foda fazer tudo isso").

== Profanities ==
- cabrão: male-only term used for men who have cheated. Used interchangeably with "bastard" or "motherfucker".
- caralho (IU): a swear word for the penis and can be used as an interjection. One possible folk etymology relates it to a ship's crow's nest, and the negative connotation from the expression "vai para o caralho", meaning "go to the crow's nest", because of the heavy rocking of ships in the high sea. This theory has since become a widely promulgated urban legend as the sole source of the swear word. The recorded use of caralho in its modern use (as "prick"), however, predates Portuguese caravels, ships with crow's nests.
- merda: shit or crap.
- puta: bitch or whore. A cognate to the Spanish puta and Italian puttana.
