= Séraphin Magloire Fouda =

Cameroonian politician and economist

Séraphin Magloire Fouda is a Cameroonian political figure and economist. He has been Secretary-General of the Office of the Prime Minister of Cameroon since 2015. Previously he was Deputy Secretary-General of the Presidency from 2009 to 2015.

Fouda worked as an economics professor at various universities in Cameroon, and in 2003 he became Dean of the Faculty of Economics and Management at the University of Yaoundé II; he concurrently worked as Director of the Center of Economic and Management Studies at that university. In 2005, he was appointed as Technical Adviser and Head of the Economic Affairs Department at the Secretariat-General of the Presidency.

Fouda was appointed as Deputy Secretary-General of the Presidency on 30 June 2009, together with Peter Agbor Tabi. Reacting to his appointment, Fouda pledged to assist President Paul Biya in the task of economic development: "President Biya promised democracy and prosperity. Democracy is here; now we must support him on the path to prosperity." According to the Cameroon Tribune, Fouda was considered one of Cameroon's best economists.

Fouda was moved to the post of Secretary-General of the Prime Minister's Office on 2 October 2015.
