= Marie Madeleine Fouda =

Cameroonian physician and politician (1940–2021)

Minister of Social Affairs
- In office December 7, 1997 – 2002
- Constituency: Centre-South

Personal details
- Born: 1940 Efok
- Died: November 13, 2021 (aged 80–81)
- Party: Cameroon People's Democratic Movement
- Education: University Center of Health Sciences
- Occupation: Physician, Politician
- Known for: First mayor of Yaoundé

Marie Madeleine Fouda (1940 – November 13, 2021) is a Cameroonian physician and politician. She is the daughter of André Fouda, the very first mayor of the city of Yaoundé from 1967 to 1980.

== Biography ==
Early life and education

Marie Madeleine Fouda was born in 1940 in Efok. She holds a doctorate in general medicine obtained in 1982 from the University Center of Health Sciences.

== Career ==
=== Political life ===
Marie Madeleine Fouda was elected deputy for the Centre-South constituency in the National Assembly of Cameroon for the fourth legislature. She served as vice president of the Cameroonian Red Cross and was a member of the central committee of the Cameroon People's Democratic Movement. She joined the government on December 7, 1997, and held the position of Minister of Social Affairs until 2002.

=== Social commitment ===
Marie Madeleine Fouda is the president of the One Father association, which provides assistance to the underprivileged, street children, and AIDS orphans.

== Death ==
Marie Madeleine Fouda died on November 13, 2021.
