= Italian profanity =

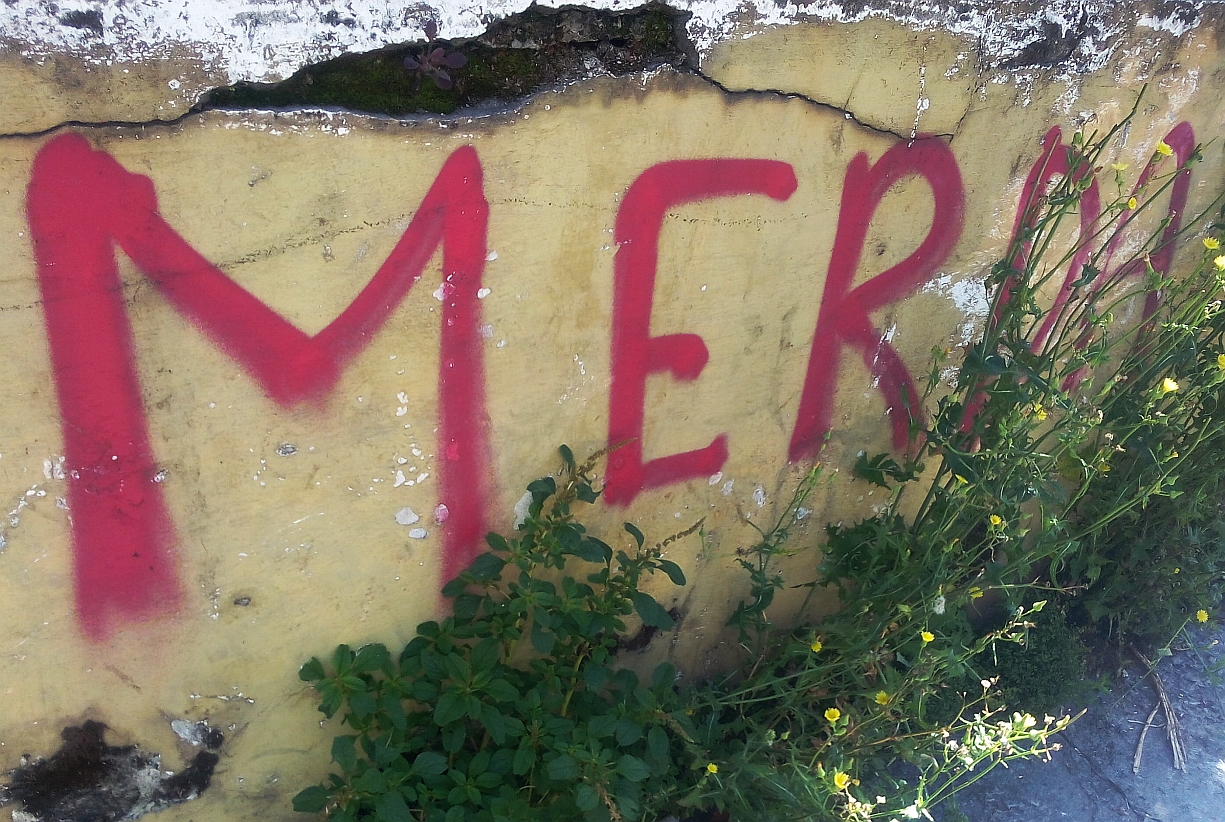
Merda, the Italian term for shit

Italian profanity (parolaccia, pl.: parolacce; bestemmia, pl.: bestemmie, when referred to religious topics) are profanities that are inflammatory or blasphemous in the Italian language.

The Italian language is a language with a large set of inflammatory terms and phrases, almost all of which originate from the several dialects and languages of Italy, such as the Tuscan dialect, which had a very strong influence in modern standard Italian, and is widely known to be based on the Florentine dialect. Several of these words have cognates in other Romance languages, such as Portuguese, Spanish, Romanian, and French.

Profanities differ from region to region, but a number of them are diffused enough to be more closely associated to the Italian language, and are featured in all the more popular Italian dictionaries.

== List of profanities in the Italian language ==
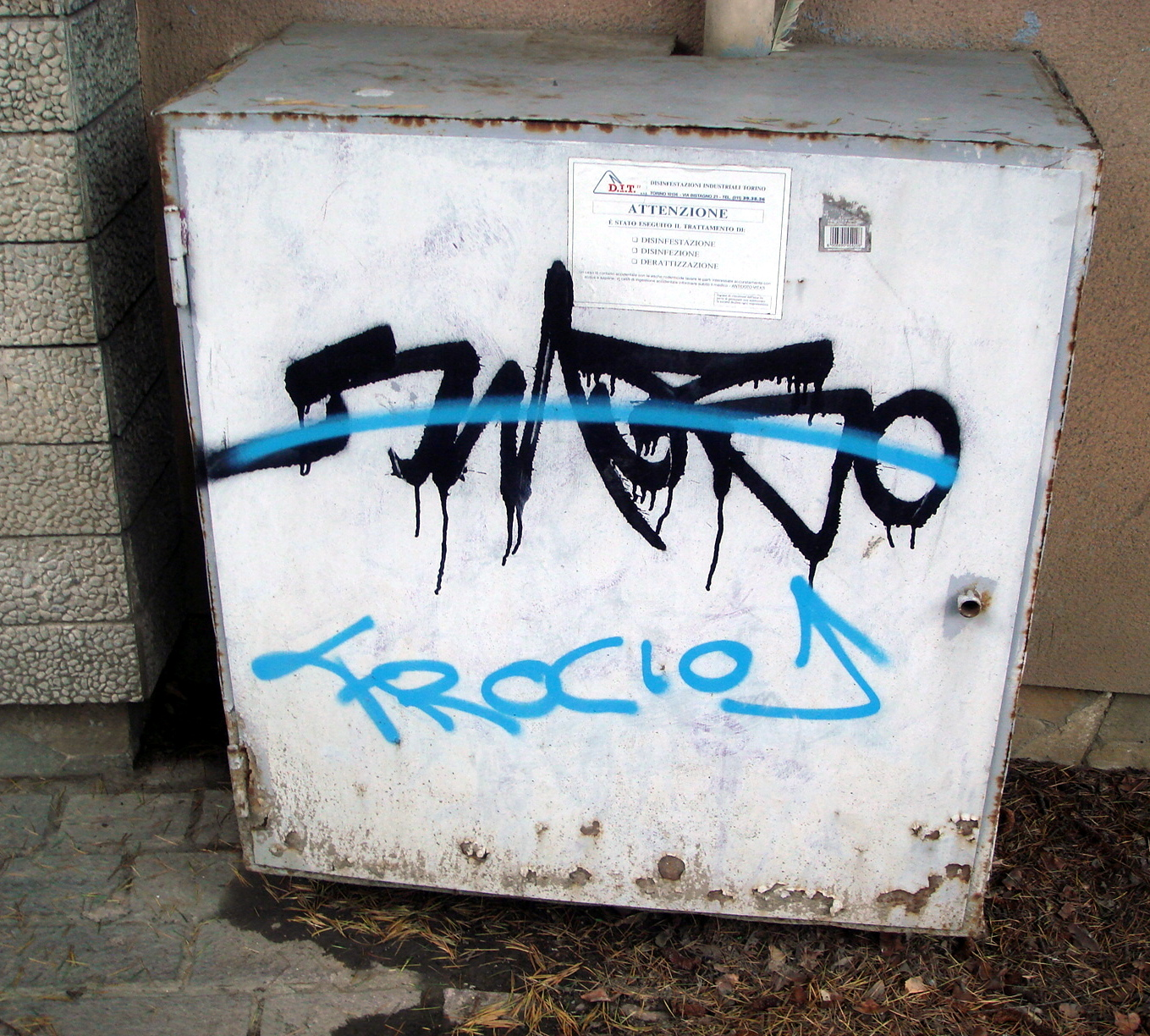
Frocio, a translation of faggot

- accidenti [attʃiˈdɛnti]: (lit. 'accidents') used in the same context as the English "damn", either as an exclamation when something goes wrong or to wish harm (such as accidents) on someone (e.g. "accidenti a te", which can be translated as "damn you").
- arrapare: sexually arouse someone.
  - arrapato: sexually aroused
  - arrapante: something or someone that arouses sexually, sexy
  - arrapamento or arrapatura: sexual arousal
- baldracca (pl. baldracche) [balˈdrakka]: whore.
- bastardo (pl. bastardi): bastard.
- barzotto/bazzotto: (referring to the penis) partially erect.
- bocchino (pl. bocchini) [bokˈkiːno]: blowjob.
- cagare or cacare: to shit, to defecate. It is used idiomatically to mean "to give a fuck" or, typically, "not to give a fuck" (with the verb in a negative form) about someone: "A scuola nessuno mi caga" ("At school nobody gives a fuck about me"). Cognate with Spanish and Portuguese cagar, ultimately from Latin cacare.
  - cagata/cacata: bullshit, crap.
  - vai a cagare/cacare: fuck you, fuck off.
- cappella: the glans of the penis.
  - scappellare: to lower the foreskin to uncover the glans.
- cazzo (pl. cazzi) [ˈkattso]: (lit. 'dick' or 'cock' or 'prick') used in numerous expressions to convey a variety of emotions such as anger, frustration, or surprise in a way similar to how 'fuck' is used in English.
  - cazzo: fuck/shit/hell.
  - che cazzo: what the hell/fuck.
  - e che cazzo!/eccheccazzo!: for fuck's sake!, oh come on!, seriously?!?
  - che cazzo fai?: what the hell/fuck are you doing?
  - cazzata: bullshit.
  - cazzo in culo: cock up your ass.
  - testa di cazzo: dick-head.
  - incazzarsi: to get pissed off.
  - incazzato: pissed off
  - incazzato nero: really pissed off.
  - incazzatura: rage, anger.
  - incazzoso: someone who gets angry easily.
  - cazzeggiare: to fuck around.
  - cazzeggio: the act of fucking around.
  - cazzone: (lit. 'big dick') stupid and foolish person.
  - cazzuto: very smart and tough person, badass.
  - scazzare: this word has many meanings: to annoy, bore, irritate someone, to fight with someone, to make somebody angry, to talk bullshit and to make mistakes.
  - scazzato: bored or angry person.
  - scazzo: difficult situation, boredom or fight, quarrel.
- coglione (pl. coglioni) [koʎˈʎoːne]: a vulgar version of testicle; when referring to a person, it usually means idiot, berk, twit, fool. Coglione was also featured in worldwide news when used by ex Italian Prime Minister Silvio Berlusconi, referring to those who would not vote for him during the 2006 Italian election campaign. It derives from Latin coleo (pl. coleones), and is thus cognate to the Spanish cojones and Portuguese colhões. In addition, it can be used in several phrases, such as:
  - avere i coglioni (lit. 'to have testicles'): to be very courageous.
  - avere i coglioni girati (lit. 'to have twisted testicles'): to be angry/in a bad mood.
  - avere i coglioni pieni (lit. 'to have the testicles full'): being fed up/have had enough/be sick and tired of something.
  - è un coglione: identifying someone as an idiot, jerk, fool, or being stupid.
  - essere un coglione: to be a jerk or fool.
  - coglionata: speech or action of a stupid person.
  - coglionaggine or coglioneria: behavior or action of a stupid person, fuckwittery.
  - coglionare: to make fun of someone, to deride.
  - coglionatura or coglionella: mockery, derision.
  - coglionatore: a person who make fun of someone, mocker.
  - coglionatorio: mocking, derisive.
  - scoglionare: to annoy, to irritate someone.
  - scoglionato: annoyed, irritated person.
  - scoglionamento or scoglionatura: boredom, irritation.
  - rincoglionire: to make someone stupid or to become stupid.
  - rincoglionito: person who has become stupid or who is acting stupid.
  - rincoglionimento: the action and the result of becoming stupid.
  - rompicoglioni or scassacoglioni: unbearable and irritating person, pain in the ass.
- cornuto (pl. cornuti) [korˈnuːto]: (lit. 'horned') cuckold, referring to a male whose female partner is cheating on him (or vice versa in the feminine form cornuta). Occasionally, it might be accompanied by the corna gesture when the word is used as a direct insult. In Southern Italy, it is considered a rough insult.
- culo (pl. culi) [ˈkuːlo]: a crude term for "buttocks", comparable to the English word "ass" or "arse". It can also mean luck, as in "è solo/tutto culo" ("it's just/all luck") or "che culo!" ("what a stroke of luck!" or "lucky bastard!" depending on tone and context). The popular expression "avere una faccia da culo" (lit. 'to have an ass-like face') indicates a cheeky, brazen-faced person. In some southern regions, "stare sul/in culo" (lit. 'to be on/in the ass') is used as a variant of "stare sul cazzo", both indicating dislike for someone. It derives from Latin culus. In Northern Italy, may also translate as "faggot", see entries below:
  - culattone (pl. culattoni): faggot.
  - inculare: to sodomize or (figurative) to cheat. "Inculare" can also be used for thieving, e.g. "Un tamarro dietro l'angolo voleva incularmi la Vespa" = "A boor behind the corner wanted to steal my Vespa". In Northern Italy the reflexive form incularsi (lit. "to sodomize oneself") may be used to tell someone to "go fuck themself".
- Dio cane: (lit. 'God dog') extremely rude and strong profanity used as an exclamation like "God damn!"; considered blasphemous by religious individuals, similar to Dio porco and porco Dio.
- ditalino (pl. ditalini): (lit. 'small thimble') fingering, female masturbation.
  - sditalinare: to stimulate the female genitalia with fingers, to fingerfuck.
- fava (pl. fave): (lit. 'fava bean'); dick; common in Tuscany.
- figa or fica (pl. fighe or fiche) [ˈfiːga] [ˈfiːka]: pussy. In past times, it was also the name of an obscene gesture called gesto delle fiche. It also means sexy, hot, and attractive if referring to a woman (or a man when saying figo or fico) Contrary to popular belief, figa is not necessarily an offensive term. If referring to a guy (figo), it means someone really cool, a stud, someone "who always knows how to get pussy." Valentino Rossi is associated with the letters WLF (for example, wearing them on his motorcycle leathers); these are known to refer to Viva la figa. Figo may also mean someone really skilled in doing something. When referring to a woman, the term strafiga means "smoking hot". The derived term figata means something cool. A less common synonym, mainly used in Rome and Naples respectively, is fregna and fessa. (even if fessa, m. fesso, can simply mean pussy, but also stupid girl)
- finocchio (pl. finocchi) [fiˈnɔkkjo]: (lit. 'fennel') a male homosexual; faggot; poof. A suggestive and very popular hypothesis suggests it may derive from the age of the Holy Inquisition in the Papal State, when fennel seeds would be thrown on homosexuals executed by burning at the stake—in order to mitigate the stench of burned flesh. However, there is no proof that this is the case.
- fottere: to fuck, commonly used in the expression "vai a farti fottere," meaning "go and get fucked," or "go fuck yourself"; ciulare and chiavare are synonyms, used in the North and in the South, respectively.
- frocio (pl. froci) [ˈfrɔːtʃo]: roughly equivalent to the American "faggot", this term originated in Rome, but is now widely used nationwide. Less-used synonyms include: ricchione/recchione (mainly Southern Italy, especially in Campania); culattone or culo (mainly in Northern Italy); busone (common in Emilia-Romagna, and also a rough synonym for "lucky"); bucaiolo or buco (common in Tuscany); and finocchio (see). The usage of this word in Italian may be considered by some individuals as homophobic and politically incorrect.
- gnocca (pl. gnocche) [ˈɲɔkka]: typical Bolognese version of figa; is mostly conjugated in its feminine form, although sometimes can be used in the masculine form. Although very vulgar, it is not offensive, but instead complimentary. Indeed, it is used nationwide to refer to an attractive woman.
- gonfiare: (lit. 'to inflate') to ingravidate, to knock up
- grilletto: (lit. 'trigger') clitoris, clit.
  - sgrillettare: to stimulate the clitoris.
- maiala [maˈjaːla]: (lit. 'sow') slut, used to insult or label a woman who is overly sexual or sexually promiscuous; common in Tuscany and Umbria.
- mannaggia [manˈnaddʒa]: a generic expression of frustration, mostly used in Southern Italy. It is not considered particularly vulgar or insulting, and is most often used jokingly; often translated as "damn" in English. The term comes from the contraction of a former utterance, "mal ne aggia," which in Neapolitan language means "may he/she get mischief out of it." Also used in books written in English, such as Mario Puzo's The Fortunate Pilgrim.
- merda (pl. merde) [ˈmɛrda]: roughly the same as English word "shit". Cognate to Spanish mierda and French merde.
  - smerdare: to shame, to take down a peg or two.
- mignotta (pl. mignotte) [miɲˈɲɔtta]: same meaning of puttana; according to some sources, it may be the contraction of the Latin matris ignotae ("of unknown mother"), where the note filius m. ignotae ("son of unknown mother") appeared in the registries that referred to abandoned children; other sources derive it from the French mignoter ("to caress") or mignon/mignonne.
- minchia (pl. minchie) [ˈmiŋkja]: the same meaning as cazzo, but notably a feminine name. Originates from Sicilian language; nowadays, it is common anywhere in Italy, where it is also used as exclamation of surprise, or even appreciation. It derives from Latin mentula.
  - testa di minchia: dickhead.
  - minchione: muggins, simpleton, fool.
  - minchiata: bullshit, crap.
  - minchia!: damn! shit! hell!
  - bimbominkia: stupid kid, especially referring to Internet users.
- mona (pl. mone): dialectic form of "cunt" or "pussy." Commonly used in North Eastern Italy, more specifically in Veneto and Friuli-Venezia Giulia.
- palla or balla: (lit. 'ball') testicle, used chiefly in the plural form.
  - che palle!: what a pain in the ass!
- (a) pecorina/(alla) pecorina: (lit. 'sheep style') doggy-style.
- pisciare: to piss.
  - pisciata: act of urinating, the emitted urine.
  - piscia or piscio: urine, piss.
  - pisciatoio: urinal, pisser.
  - piscioso: covered in piss, pissy.
- porca Madonna: (lit. 'pig Virgin Mary') extremely rude and strong profanity used as an exclamation; considered blasphemous by religious individuals.
- porco Dio: (lit. 'pig God') also dio porco, extremely rude and strong profanity used as an exclamation like "God damn!"; considered blasphemous by religious individuals.
- pompa (pl. pompe): (lit. 'pump') blowjob.
- pompino (pl. pompini): (lit. 'small pump') blowjob.
  - pompinaro (f. pompinara, pl. pompinari/pompinare): cock-sucker, person prone to perform oral sexual activities. More often used towards women.
- puttana (pl. puttane) [putˈtaːna]: whore, prostitute.
  - andare a puttane: (lit. 'to go to prostitutes'), to go with prostitutes, idiomatically it also means "to fall apart" or "go to shit", used when something fails, collapses or is ruined.
  - puttanata: crap, bullshit, rubbish.
  - puttanaio: brothel or "fuckload."
  - puttaniere: whoremonger, pimp.
  - puttaneggiare: to walk the streets, to be a prostitute.
  - puttaneggiamento: the act of walking the streets, the behavior of a prostitute.
  - puttanesimo: prostitution.
  - puttanesco: of a prostitute, typical of a prostitute.
  - puttanella: a young prostitute or a promiscuous girl.
  - sputtanare: to discredit.
  - sputtanamento or sputtanata: the action of discrediting someone.
  - sputtanato: that has been discredited.
  - imputtanare: the same thing as andare a puttane.
- ricchione (pl. ricchioni) [rikˈkjoːne]: faggot.
- sborra (or sborro, sburro, sbora; related verb: sborrare): cum.
- schizzare to cum, to jizz, to spooge
- scopare [skoˈpaːre]: (lit. 'to sweep') to fuck.
- scoreggia (pl. scoregge) [skorˈreddʒa]: fart.
- sega (pl. seghe) [ˈseːga]: wank, handjob. Literally, the term could be translated as "saw." The derivative verb is not only segare (which, in this context, is usually used in the reflexive form "segarsi"), but more commonly fare/[farsi] una sega (get a handjob /[from yourself; to jerk off]). This caused SEGA to alter its pronunciation in Italian to ˈsiːga for ads in the Italian market.
  - segaiolo: wanker.
  - segone: mook, loser.
  - mezza sega: (lit. 'half saw') lightweight, pipsqueak.
- sfiga (pl. sfighe): literally "without pussy." Has the meaning of "bad luck." A typical exclamation when something goes wrong in Italy is "che sfiga!" ("What a bad luck!")
  - sfigato (pl. sfigati): literally means "without figa," in English "without pussy." It can be translated as "loser", "unlucky" or "uncool" person.
- spagnola (pl. spagnole): (lit. 'Spanish [girl]') titty-fuck, tit-job.
- spregnare: to give birth, or, to abort
- stronzo (pl. stronzi) [ˈstrontso]: literally "turd", but also "arsehole" or "asshole", "bitch", "idiot", "stupid", "sod." It is used as an adjective to indicate that somebody is really a bad, cruel man/woman.
- troia (pl. troie) [ˈtrɔːja]: (lit. 'sow') bitch, slut, slovenly woman or whore.
- vaffanculo [vaffaŋˈkuːlo]: "fuck you!", "fuck off!", "bugger off!". A contraction of "va' a fare in culo" (literally "go do [it] in the ass"). "Vattela a pijà 'n der culo" is the Romanesco form for vaffanculo, while in Northern Italy "vai a cagare" (lit. "go to shit") is also used, "vai a dar via il culo" (lit. 'go sell your arse'), "fottiti" ("go fuck yourself") or "inculati" (lit."sodomize yourself"). In the Neapolitan language, it is pronounced "va fangool"; and at times, the "va" is omitted, as demonstrated in the film Grease (at the end of the "Sandra Dee" skit, performed by Stockard Channing).
- zoccola (pl. zoccole) [ˈdzɔkkola]: slut, whore; bitch; zoccola also means "sewer rat."

== Profanity in literature ==
Italian writers have often used profanity for the "spice" it adds to their publications. This is an example from a seventeenth century collection of tales, the Pentamerone, by the Neapolitan Giambattista Basile:

"Ah, zoccaro, frasca, merduso, piscialetto, sauteriello de zimmaro, pettola a culo, chiappo de 'mpiso, mulo canzirro! ente, ca pure le pulece hanno la tosse! va', che te venga cionchia, che mammata ne senta la mala nuova, che non ce vide lo primmo de maggio! Va', che te sia data lanzata catalana o che te sia dato stoccata co na funa, che non se perda lo sango, o che te vangano mille malanne, co l'avanzo e priesa e vento alla vela, che se ne perda la semmenta, guzzo, guitto, figlio de 'ngabellata, mariuolo!"

This tirade could be translated from Neapolitan as follows:

"Ah, good for nothing, feather, full of shit, bed-pisser, jack of the harpsichord, shirt on the arse, loop of the hanged, hard-headed mule! Look, now also lice cough loudly! Go, that palsy get you, that your mom get the bad news, that you cannot see the first of May. Go, that a Catalan spear pass through you, that a rope be tied around your neck, so that your blood won't be lost, that one thousand illnesses, and someone more, befall you, coming in full wind; that your name be lost, brigand, penniless, son of a whore, thief!"

Francis Ford Coppola had some characters in The Godfather use untranslated profanity. For instance, when Sonny Corleone found out that Paulie Gatto had sold out his father to the Barzinis, he called Gatto "that stronz." Also, when Connie Corleone learned Carlo Rizzi was cheating on her, Carlo snapped: "Hey, vaffancul, eh?" Connie then yelled back, "I'll vaffancul you!"

== Blasphemous profanity ==
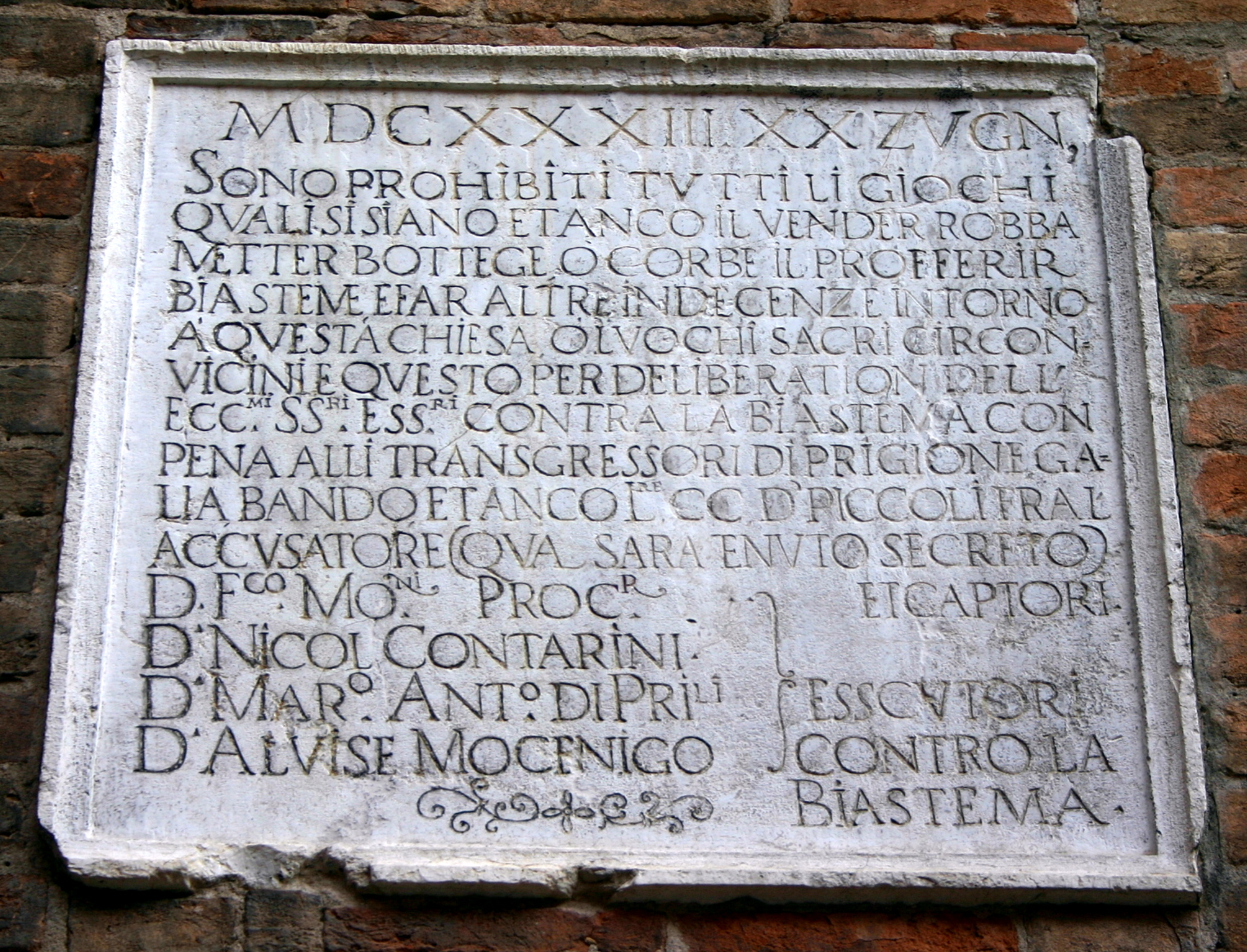
1633 plaque in Venice forbidding gambling, selling goods, and blaspheming

Profanities in the original meaning of blasphemous profanity are part of the ancient tradition of the comic cults, which laughed and scoffed at the deity. In Europe during the Middle Ages, the most improper and sinful "oaths" were those invoking the body of the Lord and its various parts—such as Bergamo dialect expression pota de Cristo ("Christ's cunt")—which resulted in these oaths being used the most frequently.

Nowadays, the most common kind of blasphemous profanity involves the name of God (Dio), Christ (Cristo), Jesus (Gesù), or the Virgin Mary (Madonna), combined with an insult or sometimes an animal—the most used being porco ("pig"), as in porco Dio ("God [is a] pig") and porca Madonna ("the Virgin Mary [is a] pig"); or cane ("dog"), as in Dio cane ("God [is a] dog").

Common blasphemous profanities in Italian are: porco Dio (often written porcodio or also porcoddio, more rarely as porco Iddio); Dio cane ("God [is a] dog"); Dio merda; Dio bestia; Dio maiale; porco Gesù; Gesù cane; Madonna puttana; porco il Cristo; Dio stronzo; and Dio Fauss with "Fauss" meaning "false, hypocrite" in Piedmontese (or Dio Fa, more colloquially).

Another common formula for blasphemy combines a divinity, an animal and an atrocious death, like in dio porco scannato.

In some areas of Italy, such as Veneto, Friuli-Venezia Giulia, Umbria, Marche, Lazio, Abruzzo, Emilia Romagna, Piedmont, Lombardy, and Tuscany, blasphemy is more common, but not because of a strong anti-Catholic sentiment. Tuscany and Veneto are the regions where bestemmiare is most common, and in these areas, blasphemy appears in the everyday speech almost as an ordinary interjection.

At the same time, it is not an entirely uncommon pastime to come up with creative and articulated bestemmie, especially among the lower social classes, such as dockers.

Since the advent of the World Wide Web, several websites have come and gone that featured user-submitted or machine-generated collections of complex bestemmie, and manuals compiling these collections of bestemmie have been printed.

=== Gravity ===
In the Italian language, profanities belonging to this category are called bestemmie (singular: bestemmia), in which God, the Virgin Mary, Jesus, the Saints, or the Catholic Church are insulted. This category is so strong it is usually frowned upon, even by people who would make casual or even regular use of the profanities above.

Bestemmiare ("swearing") is a misdemeanor in Italian law, but the law is seldom enforced. However, it is still considered a strong social taboo, at least on television. For example, anyone caught uttering bestemmie in the Italian version of the reality television franchise Big Brother (Grande Fratello) "must be immediately expelled," because they offend "millions of believers."

=== Legal status ===
Until 1999, uttering blasphemies in public was considered a criminal misdemeanor in Italy (although enforcement was all but non-existent), although nowadays, it has been downgraded to an administrative misdemeanor. Some local administrations still ban the practice. For example, after the curate complained about the frequency of blasphemous profanity in the parish recreation centre, the comune of Brignano Gera d'Adda banned the practice in the civic centre, and in all places of retail business, be it public or private. As of July 2011, only obscenities that are directly related to God are classified as a bestemmia under Italian law. Any insult to Mary or the various saints do not actually represent a bestemmia, or any violation of existing laws and rules.

=== Minced oaths ===
These profanities are also commonly altered to minced oaths, with very slight changes in order not to appear blasphemous. For instance:

- Porco zio, using zio instead of Dio, where zio is Italian for uncle; or orco Dio, where porco is replaced by orco ("ogre"), even though this second one results in a profanity as well. Other similarly minced oaths can be created by replacing Dio with a series of existent or meaningless terms, like: disi, Diaz, due (two), disco, dinci, Dionigi (Dionysius), Diomede (Diomedes), and Diavolo (devil). A more recent alteration is zio pera, where porco is replaced by pera ("pear").
- Maremma maiala, using Maremma instead of Madonna (Maremma is a seaside zone of Tuscany, and maiala means "sow"). The idiom is widely used in Tuscany, in which the origin is attributed to the swamps of Maremma that used to cause malaria and other diseases among the Tuscan population. An expression somewhat similar is Maremma bucaiola (bucaiola meaning "sodomite").
- Porca madosca, using madosca instead of Madonna, where madosca means nothing, and it sounds like a macaronic Russian version of Madonna.
- Dio boria, used instead of Dio boia. Boria means "arrogance", boia means "executioner".
- Porco disco (literally "swine disk"), used instead of Porco Dio.
- Porco discord, where Discord is a euphemism of Dio.
- Zio pera, used instead of dio porco. Literally translates to "uncle pear".

Other minced oaths can be created ad libitum when people begin to utter one of the above blasphemies, but then choose to "correct" themselves in real time. The principal example is somebody beginning to say "Dio cane" (where cane means "dog"), and choosing to say instead "Dio cantante" ("God [is a] singer") or "Dio cantautore" ("God [is a]songwriter"). Other common minced oaths include: "Dio caro" (typically used in Veneto, Lazio, and Umbria), meaning "dear God"; "Dio bono" (with bono being a contraction of buono, that means "good") or "Dio bonino" (same meaning, typically used in Tuscany); and "Dio bon" or "Dio bonazzo" (same meaning, used in Castelfranco Veneto) instead of "Dio boia" (where boia means "executioner"). In Trentino, it is also common "Dio canederlo", where the name of God is associated with one of the most known local dishes. In the province of Pordenone, Friuli-Venezia Giulia, "Dio Pordenone" is often used instead of "Dio porco".

Another minced oath is "Dio mama" (mum God), common in Veneto, and another one is Codroipo, the name of a town in Friuli-Venezia Giulia which is an anagram of "porco Dio". A peculiar minced oath created extemporaneously, especially popular among Italian teenagers, has the form of a rhyme, and read as follows: "Dio can...taci il Vangelo, Dio por...taci la pace!" and translates as: "God, sing to us the Gospel, God bring us peace!"

Cristo! or Cristo santo!, used to express rage and/or disappointment (similar to "Oh my God" or "Holy Christ"), is usually not considered a bestemmia, though it may be assumed to violate the second commandment of not making "wrongful use of the name of the Lord Thy God." Same for "Dio Cristo."

== See also ==
- Latin obscenity

== Bibliography and sources ==
- Bakhtin, Mikhail. Rabelais and His World [1941]. Trans. Hélène Iswolsky. Bloomington: Indiana University Press, 1993.
- Tartamella, Vito. Parolacce: perché le diciamo, che cosa significano, quali effetti hanno. Milan: BUR, 2006.
- Domaneschi, Filippo. Insultare gli altri, Torino: Einaudi, 2020.
