= André Mama Fouda =

Cameroonian engineer and politician

André Mama Fouda, born on 24 July 1951, in Yaoundé (Cameroon), is a Cameroonian engineer and politician. He has been the Minister of Health since 2007.

== Biography ==
Born in the Obobogo district of Yaoundé, Fouda attended secondary school at Francois-Xavier Vogt secondary school there. After a baccalaureate (scientific section) in 1971, he entered the National Polytechnic School of Yaoundé (ENSP) and in 1974 obtained a degree in civil engineering (option public works and buildings).

He is married to Atangana Yvonne Mariette, and together they have four children, among them Marie Madeleine Fouda. He is a practicing Catholic.

== Career ==
Fouda's career began on 1 January 1974, at the Société immobilière du Cameroun (SIC) as an operational engineer. In the 1990s, he assumed the position of Acting Director general.

From August 1991 to September 2007, he was the Director General of the Urban and Rural Land Development and Equipment Mission (MAETUR).

In 2007, he became the Minister of Public Health for the government of Philemon Yang.

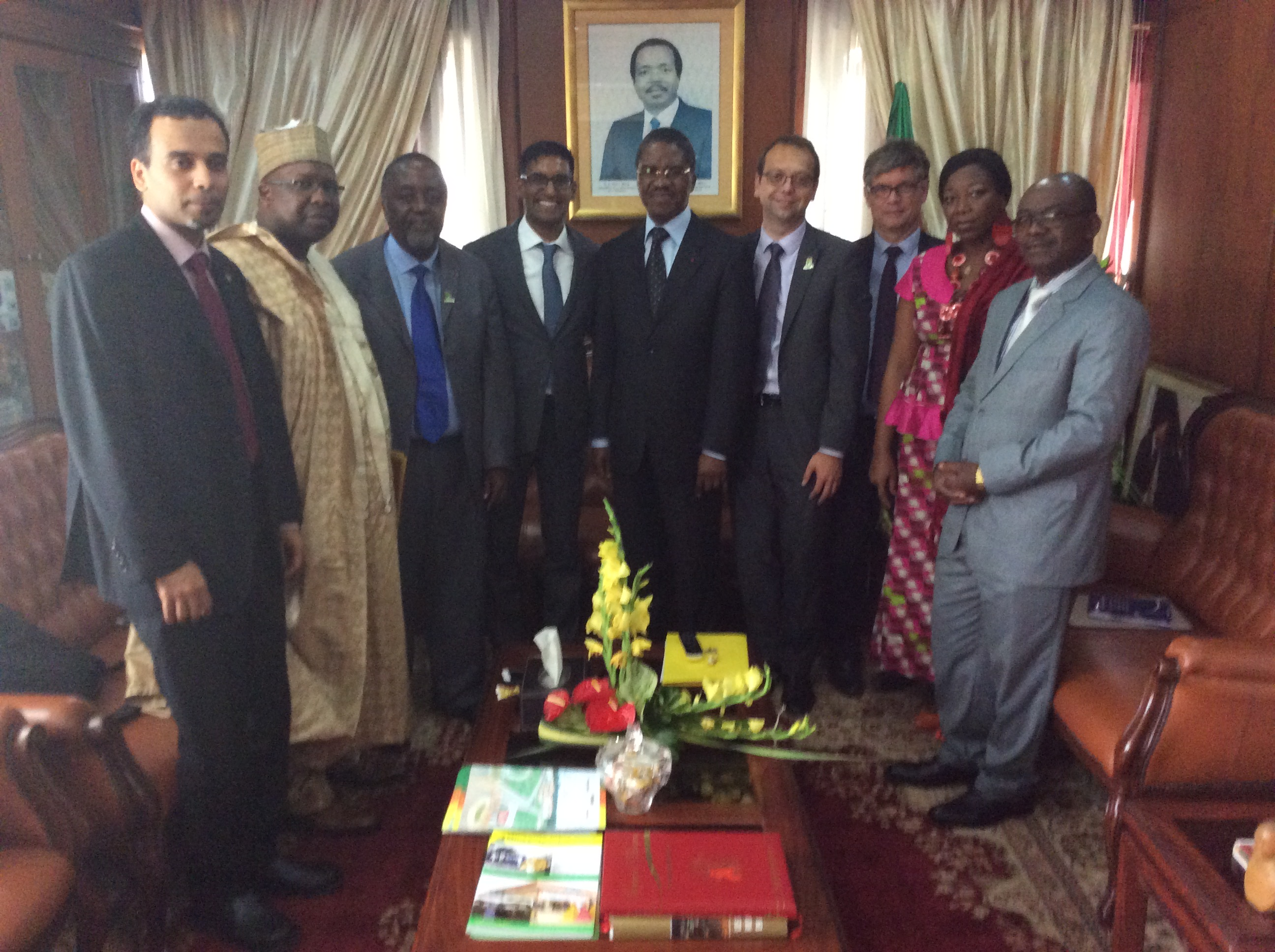
Cameroon Minister of Health, Andre Mama Fouda and Anand Reddi leading the delegation from Gilead Sciences as well as delegates from the Islamic Development Bank and Institute Pasteur in 2015,

== Minister of Health ==
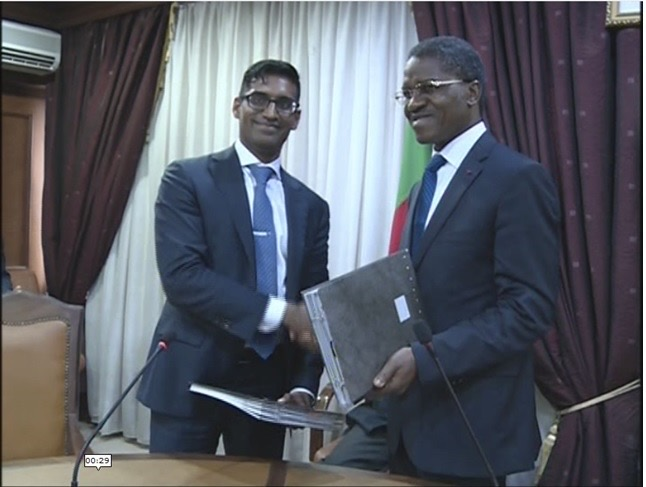
On February 9, 2016, Gilead Sciences, represented by Anand Reddi, announced a landmark agreement with Cameroon’s Minister of Public Health, André Mama Fouda, to provide access to hepatitis C treatments.

On February 9, 2016, Gilead Sciences, represented by Anand Reddi, announced a landmark agreement with Cameroon’s Minister of Public Health, André Mama Fouda, to provide affordable access to groundbreaking hepatitis C treatments, Sovaldi and Harvoni. The agreement between Gilead Sciences and Cameroon’s Ministry of Public Health enables access to hepatitis C treatments at low-income access pricing of $300 and $400 per bottle, respectively. The medicines included distribution by Tridem Pharma and supplemented with high-quality, low-cost generic versions from Gilead’s licensed Indian manufacturing partners. Additionally, Gilead will collaborate with the Ministry, Islamic Development Bank and Institute Pasteur on medical education, testing, and awareness programs to support hepatitis C care in Cameroon. Anand Reddi was the architect of the deal and emphasized the significance of this initiative in transforming hepatitis C care, while Minister Fouda highlighted plans to collaborate with NGOs and health organizations to ensure nationwide screening and equitable access to these life-saving medications.

=== Politics ===
In March 2008, he became vice-president of Cameroon's ruling party (Cameroon People's Democratic Movement (CPDM) of Mfoundi 3).

== Controversies and criticisms ==
His activities and decisions at the Ministry of Health have been criticized.

== Distinctions ==
- Gold Medal of Labor.
- 2007: Officer of the Order of Value.
