= Foutin =

Foutin was a syncretic amalgam of Priapus with Pothinus, a figure of uncertain historicity alleged by Irenaeus to have been the first bishop of Lyon. The similarity of the name Pothinus and the Old French verb foutre led to linguistic assimilation; the name Foutin may have originated from "foutre", which meant "to fuck", but it may also have been an intentionally altered version of Pothinus' name.

He was believed to have an influence in restoring fertility to barren women and vigor and virility to impotent men. At Varailles in Provence, waxen images of the members of both sexes were offered to St. Foutin, and suspended to the ceiling of his chapel. Pierre de L'Estoile commented that, as the ceiling was covered with them, when the wind blew them about, it produced an effect which was calculated to much disturb the devotions of the worshippers.

At a church in Embrun there was a large phallus said to be a relic of St. Foutin. The worshippers were in the habit of offering wine to this deity, as a libation (the wine was poured over the head of the organ); a sacred vessel underneath caught the wine, which was then called holy vinegar, and believed to be an efficacious remedy in cases of sterility, impotence, or want of virility. When Protestants conquered Embrun in 1585, they reported that the relic's head was reddened from the wine.

== See also ==
- Phallic saints

== Bibliography ==
- P.C. Remondino (1891). History of Circumcision. pp. 78–79.
