= Priapea 68 =

Latin poem of disputed authorship

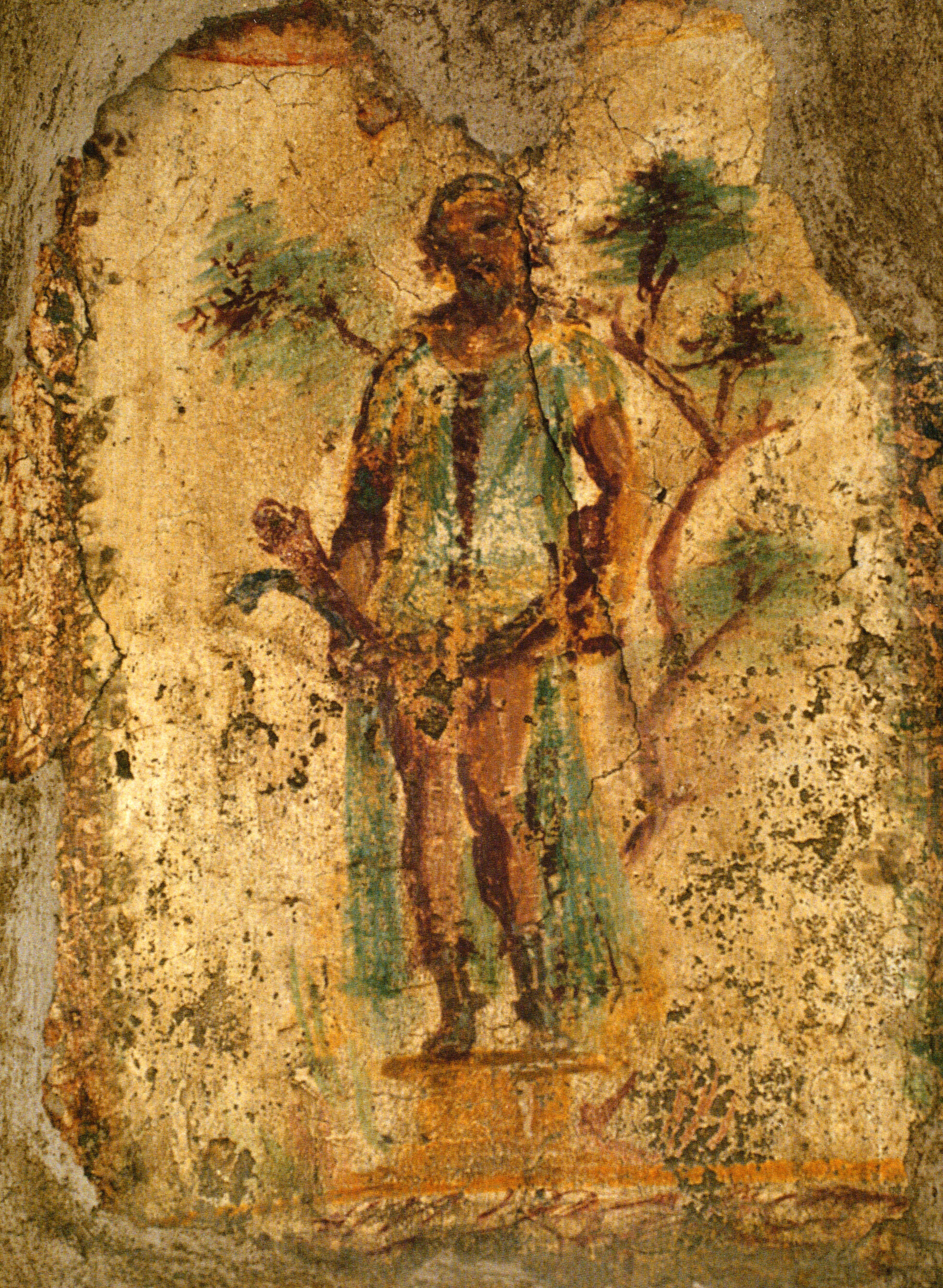
Priapus with double phallus. Fresco from the Lupanar in Pompeii. North wall, between rooms c and d. Ca. 70-79 CE

Priapeia 68 or Priapea 68 is the sixty-eighth poem in the Priapeia, a collection of Latin poetry of uncertain authorship. The eighty poems lack a unified narrative, but share Priapus, an ithyphallic god of fertility worshiped in both Ancient Hellenic and Roman religions, as by turns a speaker and subject.

While the Priapeia's author is unknown, Franz Bücheler has claimed that the poems are Augustan in style, and probably were the work of a single writer in the circle of Marcus Valerius Messalla Corvinus, a Roman general and art enthusiast who, "like other distinguished men of that age, occupied himself with amusements of this kind". Earlier traditions credited Vergil with the authorship of at least some of the Priapeia.

== Summary ==
Priapeia 68 considers the events of the Iliad and the Odyssey from the point of view of a wooden statue of Priapus, a common sight in Roman gardens as a protector of fruits and a symbol of fertility. Like most of the other poems in the collection, it features by "a focus on the god's aggressive, anally-fixated sexuality, by the absence of any discernible religious sentiment, and by the almost invariable treatment of Priapus as a figure of fun".

The servant irreverently posits that sex, and not the great Olympian gods or heroic virtues, was responsible for the events of the Epic Cycle. According to the poem, lust, sexual aggression, and male arousal, themes often associated with Priapus, are the driving forces behind such plot points as the abduction of Helen of Troy, Penelope's faithfulness, and Odysseus (Ulixes in Latin, whence Ulysses)'s entanglements with mortal and divine women in the course of his homecoming.

The poem attributes to Odysseus Priapus' own comically large penis, and places the organ at the very center of the epic. The statue argues that the memory of her husband Odysseus' "fine tool" left Penelope reluctant to settle for the less-impressive suitors courting her, but also attracted the attentions of women—Circe, Calypso, and Nausicaa—for both good and ill in the course of the poem. Where Homer emphasizes Odysseus' kingliness and manifest excellence, Priapeia 68 claims that Homer alludes euphemistically to the king's genitals.

== Text ==
W. H. Parker's 1898 translation of the poem reads:

No scholar I, but country-bred, so pardon me
If I be crude: trees is my trade, not books, you see.
Yet I know this bloke Homer, for my master proud
Spends all his time out here a-reading him out loud.
I hear, for instance, what we rustics call a prick
Is "psolenta kheraunos" in that chap's Greek,
And arse is "khouleos", and "merdaleos"—"foul"
It means—what you'd expect of prick that's been in bowel.
If Trojan cock had not brought Grecian cunt such fun,
This Homer fellow's book could not have been begun.
If bloody Agamemnon's prick had been less stout,
He'd given old Chryses damn nowt to moan about;
Nor would he then have snatched the maiden from his friend,
And she'd have been Achilles' own until the end:
Who now upon his Pelethronian lyre must sing
A woeful tune, himself stretched tenser than its string.
And so began the hero's noble rage, the same
That's the chief matter of the Iliad's tale of fame.
The other book's about Ulysses and his treks,
And, truth to tell, here too the cause of all was sex.
You read about a beauteous blossom, "molyhock",
But when they speak of "moly" they're really meaning "cock".
What else we read? How Circe—and Calypso too—
Dulichian Ulysses for his fine tool they woo.
Alcinous' daughter wondered at it next; its size
Was such that leafy bough could not its bulk disguise.
Yet, all the same, to his old woman back he goes:
His mind is in your cunt, Penelope, who chose
To remain true, yet you’d invited many a guest,
So with a crowd of would-be fuckers you were blessed;
The idea being, I dare say, to find out who
Was best at doing it of all that eager crew.
"To firmer member", says she, "no one could lay claim
Than Ulysses, in strength and skill a master at the game.
I need to know, now he has gone and left no trace,
Which one of you is man enough to take his place."
I should have been the one, Penelope, to fuck
In your mate's stead. But I was not yet made, worse luck.

== Interpretation ==
Scholarship on Priapeia 68 has largely agreed that the poem was intended as a light-hearted work of satire. However, academics have disagreed somewhat on particular target of the humor. Catherine Connors, for example, has read the poem as a joke that largely falls on Priapus, parodying his obsession with sex as even inhibiting his ability to understand a foundational work of Hellenic culture. Others, however, have proposed that the poem lampoons the Epic Cycle itself, and that Priapus is not so much the target of the humor as is the wildly heterodox interpretation of Homer's work.

Despite the poem's relative obscurity, some scholars have drawn on Priapeia 68 for reasons largely unconnected to its language or topic. A. K. Gavrilov comments that others have often the narrator's claim to have often heard his master reading (dominum totiens audire legentem) as evidence that the ancients almost invariably read aloud. He summarizes Franz Bücheler, "How should Priapus know Homeric texts to laugh at them if not from his master reading them aloud in the garden?"

== Bibliography ==
- Brill's New Pauly: Encyclopaedia of the Ancient World. Leiden Boston: Brill. 2002. ISBN 9789004122598.
- Turner, Patricia; Coulter, Charles (2001). Dictionary of Ancient Deities. New York: Oxford University Press. ISBN 0195145046.
- Room, Adrian (1983). Room's Classical Dictionary: The Origins of the Names of Characters in Classical Mythology. London Boston: Routledge & Kegan Paul. ISBN 0710092628.
- Price, Simon; Kearns, Emily (2003). The Oxford Dictionary of Classical Myth and Religion. Oxford New York: Oxford University Press. ISBN 0192802887.
- Peck, Harry Thurston. Harper's Dictionary of Classical Antiquities. New York: Harper and Brothers, 1898
- Hornblower, Simon; Spawforth, Antony (1996). The Oxford Classical Dictionary. Oxford New York: Oxford University Press. ISBN 019866172X.
- Mercatante, Anthony (2009). The Facts on File Encyclopedia of World Mythology and Legend. New York: Facts on File. ISBN 9780816073115.
- Jones, Lindsay (2005). Encyclopedia of Religion. Detroit: Macmillan Reference USA. ISBN 9780028657394.
- Connors, Catherine. Petronius the Poet: Verse and Literary Tradition in the "Satyricon". Cambridge: Cambridge University Press, 1998.
- Gavrilov, A. K. "Techniques of Reading in Classical Antiquity". The Classical Quarterly, New Series, Vol. 47, No. 1 (1997). Published by Cambridge University Press on behalf of The Classical Association. pp. 73. Citing Bücheler, Franz. Petronii Saturae et Liber Priapeorum. Berlin: Apud Weidmannos, 1922.
- Bücheler, Franz. Petronii Saturae et Liber Priapeorum. Berlin: Apud Weidmannos, 1922.
