= Guerlichon =

Saint Guerlichon (or Saint Guerluchon) was a syncretic phallic saint venerated at Bourg-Dieu near Bourges, France. Before a gradual transformation into St. Guerlichon, it was an old priapic statue that was worshiped by the surrounding people during the Roman occupation of Gaul.

== Description ==
At Bourg-Dieu, there existed, during the Roman occupation of Gaul, an old priapic statue, which was worshiped by the surrounding people. The veneration in which it was held and the miracles with which it was accredited made it impolitic as well as impossible for the early missionaries and monks to remove it.

It was therefore allowed to remain, but gradually transformed into a saint, St. Guerlichon, which did not detract any from its former merit or reputation. Sterile women flocked to the shrine, and pilgrimages and a set number of days of devotion to this saint were in order.

== Invocation ==
Scrapings from this statue infused in water were said to make a miraculous drink which ensured conception. Similar shrines to this same saint were erected at other places, and monks were kept busy supplying the statues with new members, as the women scraped away so industriously, either to prepare a drink for themselves or for their husbands, that a phallus did not last long. At one of these shrines, so onerous became the industry of replacing a new phallus to the saint, that the good monks placed an apron over the organ, informing the good women that thereafter a simple contemplation of the sacred organ would be sufficient; and a special monk was detailed to take special charge of this apron, which was only to be lifted in special cases of sterility. By this innovation the good monks stole a march on their brothers in like shrines in other localities, such as those of St. Gilles, in Brittany, or St. Rene, in Anjou, where the old-fashioned scraping and replacing still was in vogue.
