= Phallic saint =

Representation of a saint or fertility deity

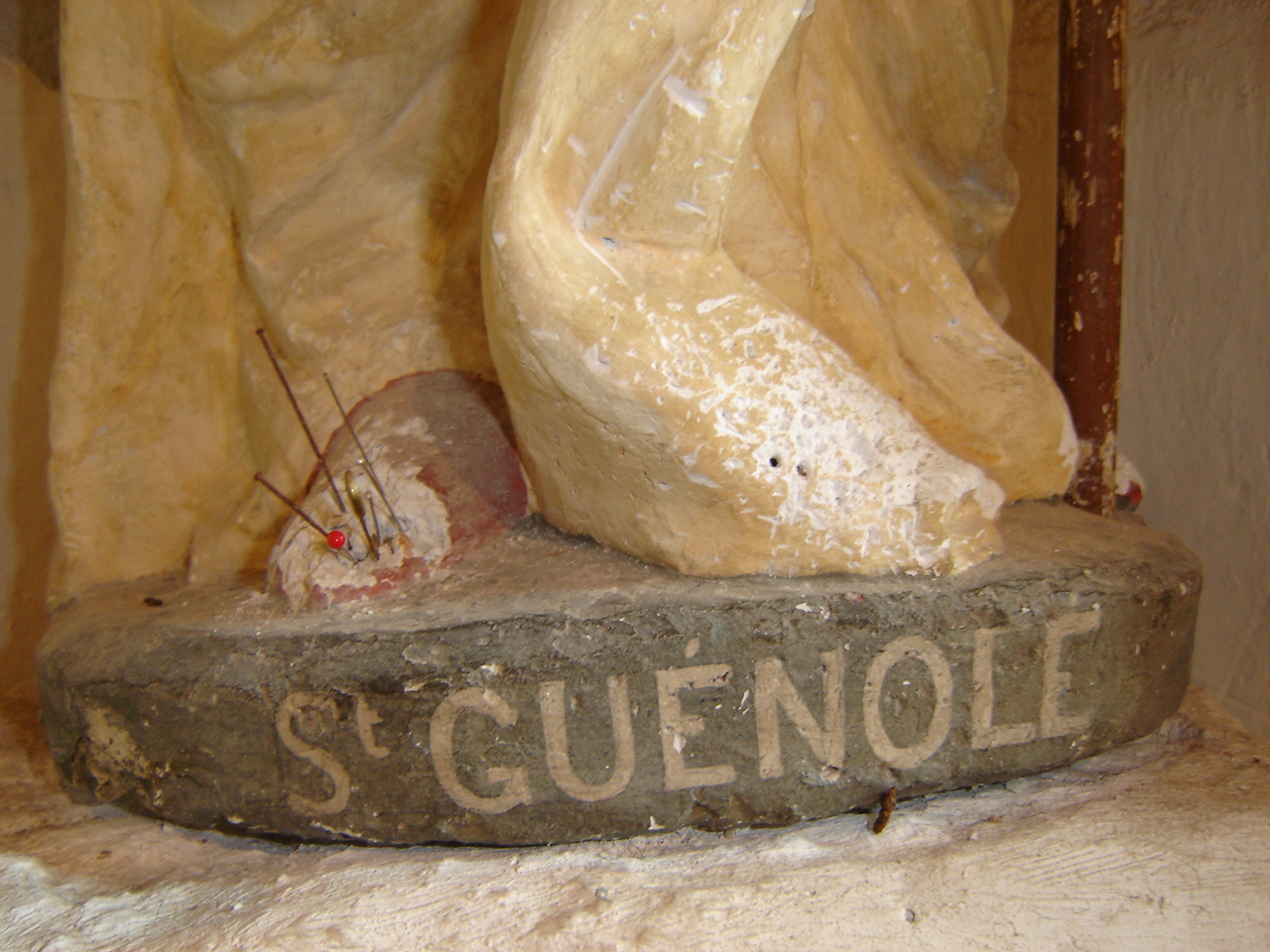
The feet of the statue of Saint Guénolé (Winwaloe, Guignolé), in a chapel of Prigny (Loire-Atlantique), are pierced with needles by local girls who hope to find their soulmates in this way.

Phallic saints are representations of saints or local deities who are invoked for fertility. The representations of the phallus are benevolent symbols of prolificacy and reproductive fruitfulness, and objects of reverence and worship especially among barren women and young girls.

== Description ==
Phallic saints are representations of actual saints or local deities who are invoked for fertility. More than vulgar representations of the phallus, phallic saints are benevolent symbols of prolificacy and reproductive fruitfulness, and objects of reverence and especial worship among barren women and young girls.

The phallic Deities of the Slavic godhood include Yarilo (Yarila, Western Slav. Yarovit, Gerovit, Serbian-Croatian Јarilo) - God awakening nature. His name comes from the root yar - "ardent, frantic, strong" and is associated with ideas about spring fertility. Wed: rus. ardent, spring, ukr. yarny "spring", yarny "spring, young, full of energy, passionate." The Slavic verb yariti has the meaning "to have sexual intercourse." One of the hymns, written on behalf of Yaril himself, says: "I covered the plains with grass and trees with foliage. I bring crops to the fields and offspring to livestock".

== Association ==
Many are legitimate saints who acquired their priapic attributes through the process of folk etymology. Sir William Hamilton (1730–1803) reported that, among the wax representations of body parts then presented as offerings to Cosmas and Damian at Isernia, near Naples, on their feast day, those of the penis are the most common. Hamiliton's observations led Richard Payne Knight to write his Account of the Remains of the Worship of Priapus, in which he reproduced examples of the effigies.

=== List of phallic saints ===
- Ters, or St. Ters, of Antwerp, whose cult was reported on by Johannes Goropius Becanus. He was also named Semini or God Jumenas.
- Saints Cosmas and Damian, twin physicians, one of whose cult-centers was Isernia, in Italy.
- Saint Guignolé (Winwaloe), first Abbot of Landévennec, who acquired his priapic status by confusion of his name with gignere (Fr. engendrer, "to beget"). His shrine was not destroyed until 1793.
- Saint Foutin, by assimilation of the name of Pothin (Pothinus), first bishop of Lyon, to the verb foutre (“to fuck”). People worshipped the phallus of St. Foutin by pouring wine on it.
- Saint Guerlichon (Greluchon) at Bourg-Dieu.
- Saint Giles (Aegidius) at Cotentin.
- Saint Rene in Anjou (by confusion with reins, "kidneys" - once believed to be the seat of sexual power).

== See also ==
- Christianity and sexuality
- St. Priapus Church
- Folk saint
- Military saint
- Secular saint
