= Priapeia =

Collection of Latin poems

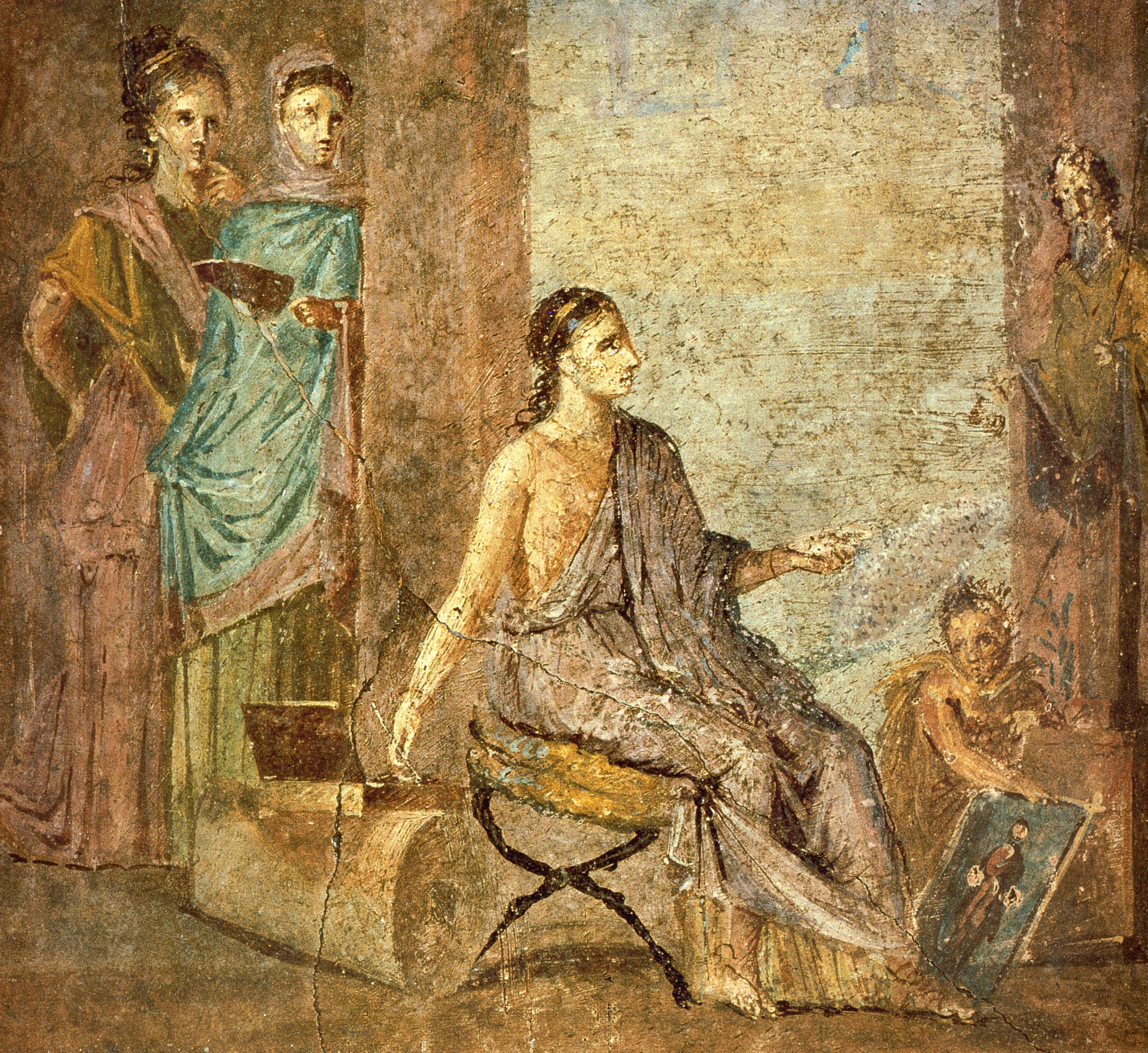
Woman painting a statue of Priapus, from a fresco at Pompeii

The Priapeia (or Carmina Priapea) is a collection of eighty anonymous short Latin poems in various meters on subjects pertaining to the phallic god Priapus. They are believed to date from the 1st century AD or the beginning of the 2nd century. A traditional theory about their origin is that they are an anthology of poems written by various authors on the same subject. However, it has recently been argued that the 80 poems are in fact the work of a single author, presenting a kind of biography of Priapus from his vigorous youth to his impotence in old age.

== Overview ==
Not counting the last few poems, which seem not to be part of the original collection, the Priapeia consists of 80 epigrams (average length 6 to 8 lines) mainly written in either hendecasyllables or elegiac couplets, with a few also in scazons. Many of the epigrams are written as though they were to be engraved on the walls of a shrine containing a statue of the god Priapus that stood in the midst of gardens as the protector of the fruits that grew in them. These statues, usually carved from wood, were in the form of a man with a huge phallus, carrying a sickle in one hand. The statues, painted red to signify sexual prowess, also promoted the gardens’ fertility.

Most of the poems in the collection are monologues by Priapus himself. In them the god congratulates and praises himself for the size and virility of his sexual parts and issues fearful warnings to those who would trespass upon his garden or attempt to steal its fruits, threatening such miscreants with various punishments of a sexual nature, such as irrumation and sodomy. The poems are notable for their use of obscene words and ideas in combination with refined and elegant diction.

In the past one theory was that the Priapeia were the work of a group of poets who met at the house of Maecenas, amusing themselves by writing tongue-in-cheek tributes to the garden Priapus. (Maecenas was Horace’s patron.) Others, including Martial and Petronius, were thought to have added more verses in imitation of the originals. However, since a study by the German scholar Vinzenz Buchheit in 1962, the theory has gained ground that they are the work of a single poet illustrating Priapus's decline from a vigorous youth to an impotent old age. The first two poems are a dedication by the author and the last one is a prayer to Priapus to increase the sexual prowess of the poet himself.

In 1890, the Priapeia were translated into English by Leonard Smithers and Sir Richard Burton (the latter of whom also freely translated The Book of the Thousand Nights and a Night), who provided numerous glosses concerning the sexual practices and proclivities that are referenced in the poems. These explanatory notes address such diverse topics as oral sex (fellatio and cunnilingus), irrumation, masturbation, bestiality, sexual positions, eunuchism, phalli, religious prostitution, aphrodisiacs, pornography, and sexual terminology, but are not always accurate scholarly reflections of ancient Roman practices. A more recent translation titled The Priapus Poems has been carried out by Richard W. Hooper.

In their "Introduction" to the Priapeia, Smithers and Burton claim that "The worship of Priapus amongst the Romans was derived from the Egyptians, who, under the form of Apis, the Sacred Bull, adored the generative Power of Nature," adding that "the Phallus was the ancient emblem of creation, and representative of the gods Bacchus, Priapus, Hermaphroditus, Hercules, Shiva, Osiris, Baal and Asher, who were all Phallic deities."

== Authorship ==
Although even today some scholars hold that the Carmina Priapea are anthology of poems by different authors, others support the arguments for the single authorship of all 80 poems.

Among these arguments are the following. First, the poems seem to have been carefully arranged according to metre. Only three metres are used. There appear to be 5 groups of 14 poems each. The first fourteen poems alternate between elegiac couplets and hendecasyllables. In the second to fifth groups the alternation is not so regular, but each group contains exactly 7 poems in hendecasyllables and 7 poems in either elegiac couplets or scazons. The scazon poems are arranged two in the 3rd group, two in the 4th, and two in the 5th. The last ten poems consist of a coda of 4 poems in elegiac couplets, 3 in hendecasyllables, 2 in scazons, and 1 poem in elegiac couplets. Kloss argues that if the poems were a miscellaneous anthology, they would presumably have contained poems in other metres too, such as the iambic (84 and 87), aeolic (85, 89) or hexameter (95) metres used in the "extra" poems in Smithers and Burton's edition.

Further, in the second dedicatory poem, the poet announces that he has written (not collected together) the poems: "Playfully, without taking too much trouble, I have written these poems, which as you can witness, Priapus, are more suitable for a garden than for a book of poems":

lūdēns haec ego teste tē, Priāpe,
hortō carmina digna, nōn libellō,
scrīpsī nōn nimium labōriōsē

A third argument is based on the observation that pairs of consecutive or near-consecutive poems are often linked by the repetition of a word. For example, the rare word erucarum (rocket) in 46.8 is repeated in erucis in 47.6; Maurae ... puellae in 45.3 is echoed by puella Mauro in 46.1; virgineum locum in 2.5 reappears as virgo ... loci in 3.7, and so on. There are also possibly wider links between the poems. For example, Laure Sandoz sees a connection between the words membrōsior in 1.5, mentulātior in 36.11, and sarcinōsior (or in some texts fascinōsior) in 79.4, all meaning "endowed with a larger penis", at the beginning, middle, and end of the collection, with the last two words both in the last line of a scazon poem.

On the other hand, the poet also clearly aims at variety. For example, in the first group of 14 poems, the god's oversized phallus is referred to in a number of different ways (mentula, partī, inguen, tēlum, columna and so on).

Another argument concerns the subject matter of the poems themselves, which like the collections of love poetry of the poets of the time of Augustus, show the course of an affair from its beginning to its end. In the first group of fourteen poems, Priapus is shown as boastful and vigorous, but gradually problems set in. In poem 26 he confesses that he is worn out by sex (effutūtus) and thin and pale (macerque pallidusque) and complains that the neighbouring women give him no rest. In poem 33, on the other hand, he complains that he is compelled to relieve himself with his own hand for want of female companions among the nymphs. Towards the end of the book the problems multiply. In poem 56 he is mocked by a thief and shown the middle finger (impudīcum digitum) because his phallus is only made of wood, and he is reduced to calling on his master to perform the punishment. In poem 70 he has become so impotent that he has to endure the humiliation of a dog performing fellatio on him all night. In poem 76 we learn that Priapus is now old and grey-haired and only good for penetrating old men. In 77 he complains that because of a hedge round the garden he is no longer getting any sex. Finally, in 79, an anonymous speaker informs Priapus that he is no better endowed than "our poet" – who, it appears from the final poem, has an unusually small penis.

== Date ==
The date of the Carmina Priapea is still disputed, though is generally assumed to be in the 1st century AD. One piece of evidence for the date of the collection is the phrase inepta locī ("foolish ... of the place") which occurs in poem 3.8 in connection with a girl who offers her backside to her husband on her wedding night instead of the usual place. The same phrase, in a similar context, is quoted in Seneca the Elder (Contr. 1.2.22), where it is called Ovidiānum illud ("that Ovidian phrase"). Some scholars have assumed therefore that poem 3 of the collection at least was composed by Ovid. However, the German scholar Gerrit Kloss argues that this is not necessarily so. It could be that inepta locī simply imitates a lost poem of Ovid, rather than being the first instance of its use. The same poem contains a number of other literary echoes of phrases used by Ovid, Virgil, and Horace.

Another piece of evidence is that certain words in the poems, such as circitor ("watchman"), rubricatus ("painted red"), prūrīgo ("sexual desire") and so on, are not used until writers of the time of Nero or later. Assuming that all the poems are by a single author, then the whole collection can be dated to the time of Nero or later.

A number of arguments from prosody have also been put forward by H. Tränkle (1998) in an attempt to date the poems. For example, it has been argued that the long -ō in spondaic words like virgō and ergō (in 11 out of 13 cases in the Carmina Priapea) is closer to Ovid's practice than that of Martial, where the -o is usually short. However, Kloss points out that this argument is weak, since other writers later than Ovid, such as Petronius and Silius Italicus also preferred the long -ō.

Buchheit (1962) found sufficient echoes of Martial to argue that the poems must date from after Martial's time. Kloss (2003) is less certain, but thinks that the poems date at the earliest to Nero's time, but more probably to a period after Martial.

== Other Priapic poems ==
The 80 poems of the Carmina Priapea are by no means the only poems which survive from the ancient world in honour of Priapus. Kytzler's edition contains 37 poems in Greek excerpted from the Greek anthology dating from the 3rd century BC to the 6th century AD.

In Latin, outside the Corpus Priapeorum there are about 23 Priapea of various types, some of which are added as poems 83–95 in Smithers and Burton's edition of the Priapeia.

The earliest extant Priapic poem in Latin (no. 89 in Smithers and Burton) appears to be Catullus fragment 1, which is written in the "Priapean" metre (a type of aeolic). It begins:

hunc lūcum tibi dēdicō cōnsecrōque, Priāpe

"I dedicate and consecrate this grove to you, Priapus"

Three poems in the collected works of Catullus (16, 47, and 56) are also judged to be Priapic in character. Catullus's famous threat to "sodomise and irrumate" (pēdīcābo ego vōs et irrumābō) his friends Aurelius and Furius (Catullus 16) is imitated in the passive voice in Priapea 35 (pēdīcāberis irrumāberisque).

Among works of other poets, Horace Satires 1.8 (included as no. 95 in Smithers and Burton's edition of the Priapeia) is a 50-line poem in hexameters in which Priapus recounts how the garden he was guarding, a former graveyard, was plagued by witches until suddenly the wood of his backside split open with a loud farting noise and scared them off.

Four anonymous poems in the Appendix Vergiliana (nos. 86, 87, 88, and 84 of Smithers and Burton's edition of the Priapeia) are also Priapic. In the first, the god describes his sufferings in the winter; in the second he describes his guardianship of the farm throughout the seasons, and demands respect from a passer-by; in the third, he warns some boys not to steal from his farm but to go to the neighbour's farm instead.

In the fourth poem, the anonymous poet addresses Priapus and chides him for causing him to become impotent when sleeping with a boy. Both this and the short prayer to Priapus to protect a farm (no. 83 in Smithers and Burton) are sometimes, but for no good reason, attributed to Tibullus.

Tibullus 1.4 is part of a series of 3 elegies about Tibullus's love for a certain boy called Marathus. In this 82-line poem, Priapus gives advice to the poet on how to seduce boys.

There are also some epigrams of Martial addressed to or written about Priapus; they include 85 and 90–94 in Smithers and Burton's Priapeia, as well as Martial 1.40, in which the poet asks Priapus to guard a grove of trees from thieves, threatening to use the statue of the god for firewood if he fails.

== Bibliography ==
- Buchheit, Vinzenz (1962). Studien zum Corpus Priapeorum (Zetemata, 28). Pp. viii+ i59. Munich: Beck.
- Butrica, J. L. (2000). "The Priapus Poems – Bryn Mawr Classical Review". Bryn Mawr Classical Review.
- Dutsch, Dorota and Ann Suter (ed.) (2015), Ancient Obscenities: Their Nature and Use in the Ancient Greek and Roman Worlds. Ann Arbor: University of Michigan Press. ISBN 9780472119646. Reviewed by Jeffrey Henderson Bryn Mawr Classical Review 2017.05.46.
- Elomaa, Heather E. (2015). "The Poetics of the Carmina Priapea". University of Pennsylvania ScholarlyCommons. Archived from the original on October 21, 2018.
- Holzberg, Niklas (2005). "Impotence? It Happened to the Best of Them! A Linear Reading of the Corpus Priapeorum". Hermes, 133. Jahrg., H. 3 (2005), pp. 368–381. (Reviews recent scholarly views on the Priapeia.)
- Hooper, Richard W. (ed.) (1999). The Priapus Poems: Erotic Epigrams from Ancient Rome. Urbana and Chicago, IL: University of Illinois Press. ISBN 0-252-06752-5
- Kenney, E.J. (1963) "Review: Corpvs non ita Vile". A review of Studien zum Corpus Priapeorum by Vinzenz Buchheit. The Classical Review Vol. 13, No. 1 (Mar., 1963), pp. 72–74.
- Kloss, Gerrit (2003). "Überlegungen zur Verfasserschaft und Datierung der Carmina Priapea" Hermes 131. Jahrg., H. 4 (2003), pp. 464–487. (See Holzberg (2005) for a summary.)
- Parker, W. H. (1988). Priapea: Poems for a Phallic God. London: Croom Helm.
- Richlin, Amy (1992 [1983]). The Garden of Priapus: Sexuality and Aggression in Roman Humor. New Haven, Conn.: Yale University Press.
- Sandoz, Laure Chappuis (2011). "PRIAPUS FORMOSUS:" DENKT PRIAP ÜBER LEXIK, FORM UND GESTALT NACH? Carmina Priapea 36-39-75 und Adjektive auf -osus" Rheinisches Museum für Philologie, Neue Folge, 154. Bd., H. 1 (2011), pp. 87-110.
- Uden, James (2007). "Impersonating Priapus". The American Journal of Philology, Vol. 128, No. 1 (Spring, 2007), pp. 1-26.
- Young, Elizabeth (2015), "Dicere Latine: The Art of Speaking Crudely in the Carmina Priapea". In Dutsch and Suter (2105), pp. 255–82.

== Online texts ==
- Carmina Priapea ed. Bernhard Kytzler (Zürich/München 1978), in Latin with a German translation by Carl Fischer. (Bibliotheca Augustana). (It contains 80 poems, and also has a section with Greek Priapeia taken from the Greek Anthology.)
- Priapeia. Contains 95 poems, with a translation by Leonard C. Smithers and Sir Richard Burton (1890), with notes. (The first poem is unnumbered in this edition, so the numbering of the poems differs from Kytzler's text.)
- Petronii saturae et liber priapeorum, Franz Bücheler (ed.), Berolini, apud Weidmannos, 1904. (The Priapea begin on page 137 (139).)

== See also ==
- Priapus
- Latin obscenity
- Priapea 68
