= Tychon =

Minor Greek deity

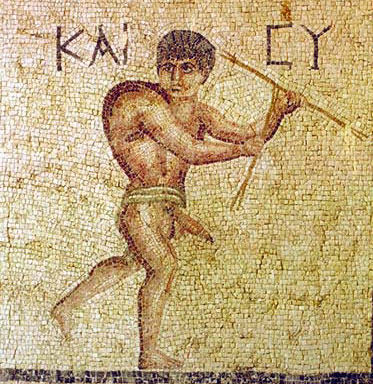
A depiction of Tychon, who holds spits in his hands as a sign of good luck

Tychon or Tykhon (Τύχων, Tykhōn = "producer") is the name of two minor deities in Greek mythology. One was a daemon of fertility associated with Phales, Priapus and his mother Aphrodite. He and his companions Orthanes and Conisalus were associated with Dionysos or with the Hermai (phallic statues of Hermes). Although nowhere stated, his father was likely one of these two gods, who were half-siblings, sons of Zeus.

Another Tychon, a god of chance or accident, is mentioned by the geographer Strabo, who stated that “Priapos... resembles the Attic deities Orthanes, Konisalos (Conisalus), Tykhon (Tychon), and others like them.” He was worshipped at Athens.

The only known depiction of Tychon is now in Hatay Archaeology Museum, Turkey. He is shown as a boy with a semi-erect penis opposite the kakodaimon (evil spirit) and its evil eye.
