= Orthanes =

Ancient Greek god

- Ithyphallic god
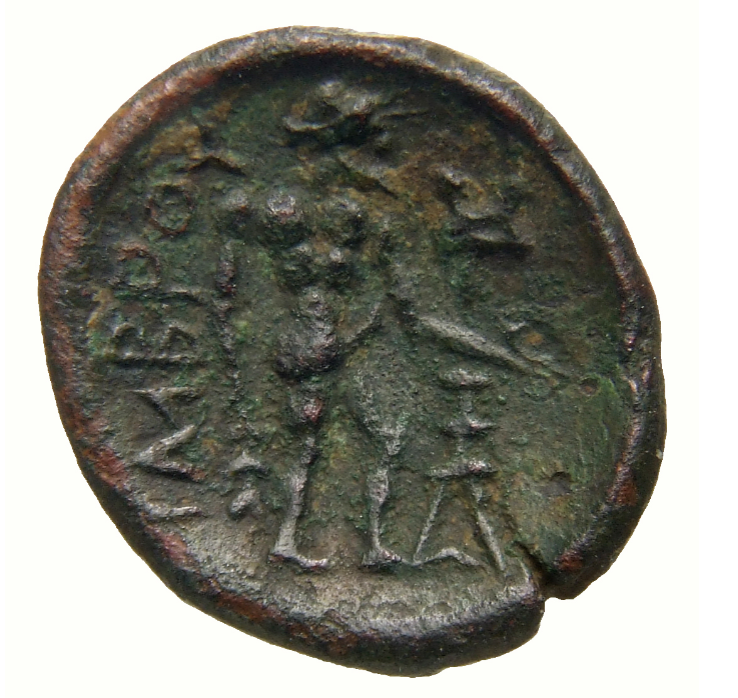
- Orthanes on an Imbriot coin from around 276/261-167 BC, Münzkabinett Berlin
- Major cult center: Imbros, Athens
- Abode: Imbros
- Symbols: Phallus
- Parents: Hermes and a nymph

In ancient Greek religion and mythology, Orthanes or Orthannes (Ancient Greek: Ορθάν(ν)ης, romanized: Orthán(n)ēs) is a minor fertility and phallic god worshipped in Athens and the island of Imbros in the Aegean Sea. Little is known about Orthanes, his mythology and cult. Orthanes was seen as an ithyphallic god in the likes of Priapus, the fertility god with enlarged genitalia. His imagery was used on coins from Imbros.

== Description ==
Very little information survives on Orthanes' role in ancient Greek legends and mythology. Patriarch Photius I of Constantinople writes that Orthanes was the son of Hermes and a nymph. The Hellenistic poet Lycophron likens the lovestruck Paris to Orthanes, and Byzantine scholar John Tzetzes in his commentary on Lycophron describes Orthanes as a "Priapus-like daemon around Aphrodite." Along with Conisalus and Tychaon, he was one of the lesser phallic gods who were absorbed into Priapus, although older than him.

== Cult ==
=== Attica ===
Although Orthanes is attested in Attic authors, his worship seems to have been insignificant. Strabo wrote that Orthanes was an Athenian god like Conisalus and Tychaon, and that he resembled the phallic Priapus. He was probably honoured only in unofficial thiasoi. In the fragmentary old comedy Phaon by comic playwright Plato, the titular character (who is using his god-given attractive sexual power over women) says that three pecks of bulbs (perhaps onions) are to be sacrificed to Orthanes. The poet Eubulus also wrote a lost play Orthanes, of which one of the few surviving fragments apparently describes the preparations of a celebration and feast in honour of Orthanes.

=== Imbros ===
By contrast Orthanes seems to have been a lot more important in Imbros, an island in the northeastern Aegean Sea. In Imbros he had a public cult with processions, sacrifices, and a priest as late as the second century BC. An ancient Greek honorary decree of the second century BC from Imbros mentions a procession and sacrifice to Orthanes with expenses covered by the city, and a priest by the name Calliades, who also provided funds.

Even though Imbros was a colony of Athens and earlier scholars suggested Orthanes was a local Athenian god brought to Imbros, it is unlikely that of all Athenian gods it was a marginal one that the settlers introduced to the Imbriots who then went on to achieve great importance in a clerurchy. It is more probable that an important god of the new colony was taken back to Athens, but failed to gain much recognition outside of his homeland and could only take a minor position. There is abdundant evidence of the Athenian empire adopting cults from their allies and subjects.

== Iconography ==
The naked ithyphallic god who appears on ancient coins from Imbros can be identified as Orthanes. Orthanes is usually depicted on the reverse of those coins, as a bearded and phallic god looking to the right, holding a branch and a patera (sacrificial bowl) on his outstretched left hand, standing next to a thymiaterion (a type of incense burner).

== See also ==
- Aphroditus, a male version of Aphrodite
- Dionysus, whose worship included penile imagery
- Aphaia, an Aegean goddess

== Bibliography ==
- Eubulus (1983). Hunter, R. L. (ed.). The Fragments: Eubulus. Cambridge, UK: Cambridge University Press. ISBN 0-521-24436-6.
- Foucart, Paul-François (1883). "Inscriptions des clérouques athéniens d'Imbros". Bulletin de correspondance hellénique (in French). 7.
- Herter, Hans (1942), "Orthanes", in Realencyclopädie der classischen Altertumswissenschaft, Band XVIII, Halbband 2, edited by Karl Mittelhaus, Stuttgart, J. B. Metzler, 1942. Wikisource.
- Lycophron, Alexandra (or Cassandra) in Callimachus and Lycophron with an English translation by A. W. Mair ; Aratus, with an English translation by G. R. Mair, London: W. Heinemann, New York: G. P. Putnam 1921 . Internet Archive.
- Osborne, Robin (2023). The Athenian Empire. Cambridge, UK: Cambridge University Press. ISBN 978-1-009-38364-6.
- Parker, Robert (1994). "20: Athenian Religion Abroad". In Robin Osborne; Simon Hornblower (eds.). Ritual, Finance, Politics. Oxford: Oxford University Press. ISBN 978-0-1981-4992-7.
- Photius I, Lexicon, vol. II, Naber, S. A. (Samuel Adrianus), 1864. Internet Archive.
- Plato, Testimonia and Fragments in Fragments of Old Comedy, Volume III: Philonicus to Xenophon. Adespota. Edited and translated by Ian C. Storey. Loeb Classical Library 515. Cambridge, MA: Harvard University Press, 2011.
- Scherf, Johannes (October 1, 2006). "Phallus". In Cancik, Hubert; Schneider, Helmuth (eds.). Brill's New Pauly. Translated by Christine F. Salazar. Tübingen: Brill Reference Online. doi:10.1163/1574-9347_bnp_e917960. ISSN 1574-9347.
- Strabo, Geographica, literally translated, with notes by H.C. Hamilton, Esq., W. Falconer, M.A., Ed., in three volumes. London. George Bell & Sons. 1903. Online text available at Perseus Digital Library.
