= St Ters =

Statue of a phallic saint in Antwerp

St Ters of Antwerp is one of the names given to the statue of a phallic saint, supposedly worshiped for promoting fertility.
