= Secular saint =

Term of veneration

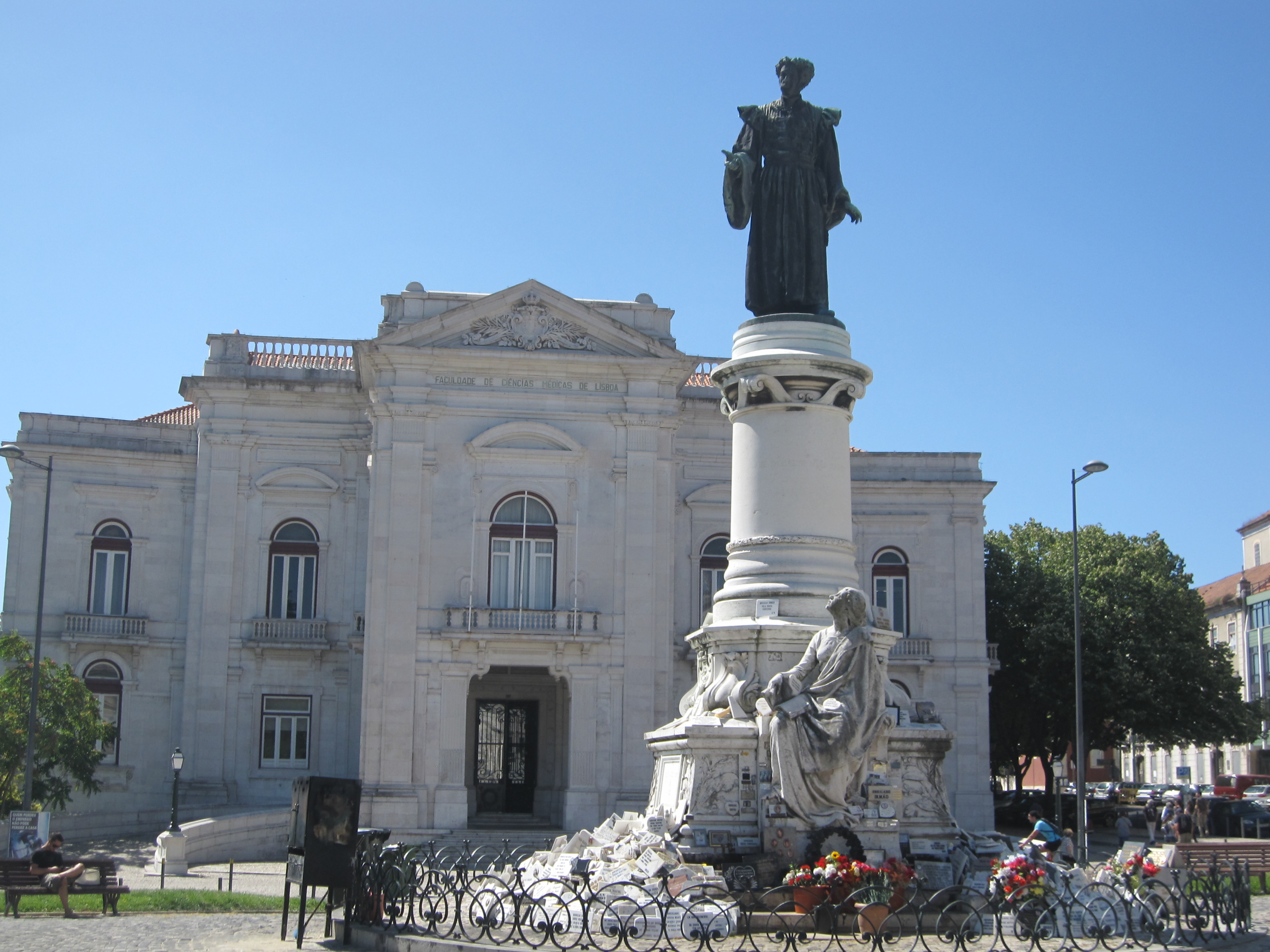
Monument to José Tomás de Sousa Martins, 19th-century Portuguese physician, in Lisbon. After his death, a popular secular cult arose around his figure: ex-votos thanking him for miraculous cures and a rack for votive candles can be found around the base of the statue.

The term "secular saint" has no strict definition, but generally refers to someone venerated and respected for contributions to a noble cause, but not recognized as a canonical saint by any particular religion. The ranks of secular saints, like those of religious ones, are often filled by martyrs.

== Revered historical figures ==
George Orwell began his "Reflections on Gandhi": "Saints should always be judged guilty until they are proved innocent…" Orwell concluded his essay with an attack on the idea of sainthood but praise for Gandhi:

One may feel, as I do, a sort of aesthetic distaste for Gandhi, one may reject the claims of sainthood made on his behalf (he never made any such claim himself, by the way), one may also reject sainthood as an ideal and therefore feel that Gandhi's basic aims were anti-human and reactionary: but regarded simply as a politician, and compared with the other leading political figures of our time, how clean a smell he has managed to leave behind!

The term "secular saint" has also been used with reference to the incel community, which has been observed referring to mass-killer Elliot Rodger as "Saint Elliot" within the online spaces and discourses of the community and celebrating the anniversary of the 2014 Isla Vista killings as "Saint Elliot Day". Some academics, such as Taisto Witt, have suggested that, while the incel community is apparently nonreligious, their treatment of Rodger suggests that he has been appointed to a position that functionally operates as that of a saint within the community.

== See also ==
- Beatification
- Canonization
- Hagiography
- Saint
- Folk saint
- Phallic saint
- Military saint
- List of pharaohs deified during lifetime

== References and further reading ==
- "The Path of Brighteousness" by Cullen Murphy for The Atlantic (November 2003)
- Witt, T. (30 June 2020). "'If i cannot have it, i will do everything i can to destroy it.' the canonization of Elliot Rodger: 'Incel' masculinities, secular sainthood, and justifications of ideological violence". Social Identities. 26 (5): 675–689. doi:10.1080/13504630.2020.1787132.
