= Lotis (mythology) =

Greek mythological figure

Lôtis
- Lotus-nymph
- Member of Naiads
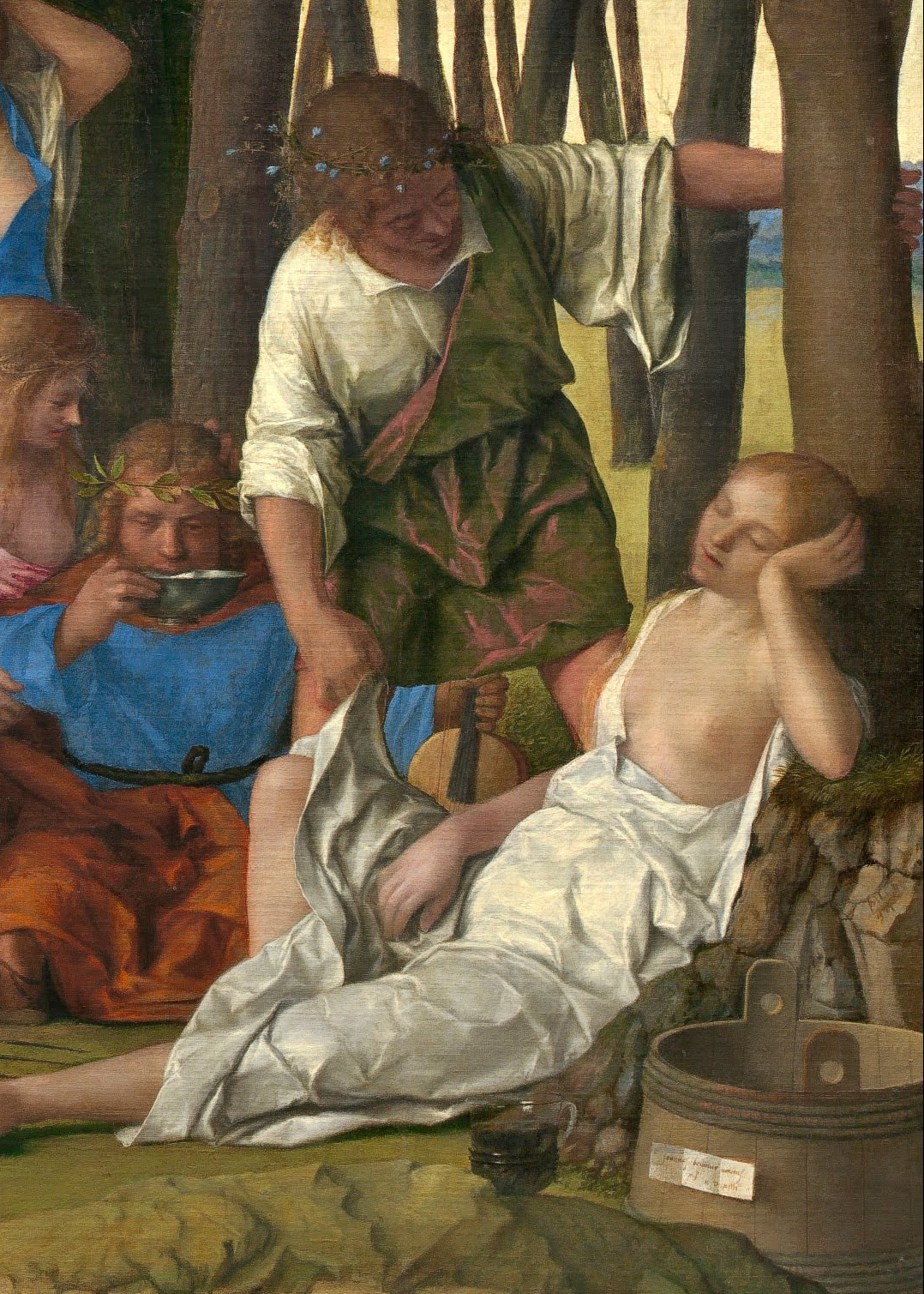
- Priapus and Lotis, detail of The Feast of the Gods by Giovanni Bellini (c. 1514)
- Abode: Dryopia
- Parents: Poseidon
- Consort: Priapus (wooer)

In Greek mythology, Lotis (Ancient Greek: Λωτίς, romanized: Lōtís or Lôtis, lit. 'lotus' or 'lotus flower/ tree') was a nymph mentioned by Ovid. She was said to be the daughter of Poseidon.

== Mythology ==
In Ovid's Fasti, at the Liberalia festival, Priapus tried to rape the nymph Lotis when everyone had fallen asleep, but she was awakened by a sudden cry of Silenus's donkey and ran off, leaving Priapus in embarrassment as everyone else woke up too and became aware of his intentions. In another work of his however, the Metamorphoses, Lotis escaped Priapus only when she was changed into a lotus, either a plant or the lotus tree; later, Dryope picked a flower off the tree Lotis had become, and was transformed into a black poplar. This narrative is only found in one more author, Servius.

In Book 6 of the Fasti Ovid tells much the same story, but with the goddess Vesta rather than Lotis as the intended victim. Ovid suggests that Priapus later kills the donkey.

== Analysis ==
What the 'lotus' (if not the tree), that Lotis turned into is, has stirred much debate. Ovid describes it as having reddish-purple flowers and growing near water; the Indian lotus and the water lily have both been suggested but also rejected by a number of scholars on account of them growing in water and not near it. Counter-arguments in favour of those plants include the fact that while they are rooted in sediments of water bodies, they do not grow in water over eight feet deep (that is, they grow in very shallow water). Servius, on the other hand, writes that Lotis became the tree.

== In art ==
The story does not seem to feature in Ancient Greek vase-painting, and only occasionally in later art. Priapus and Lotis appear in the right foreground of The Feast of the Gods by Giovanni Bellini (c. 1514), in an engraving by Giovanni Battista Palumba (c. 1510), and a drawing by Parmigianino of the 1530s. Bellini keeps Priapus's aroused state visible under his clothes, Palumba has it out in the open, as Parmigianino originally did, but this has been altered subsequently, as very explicit details often were in art. There are also some depictions of Lotis as a tree.

== Gallery ==
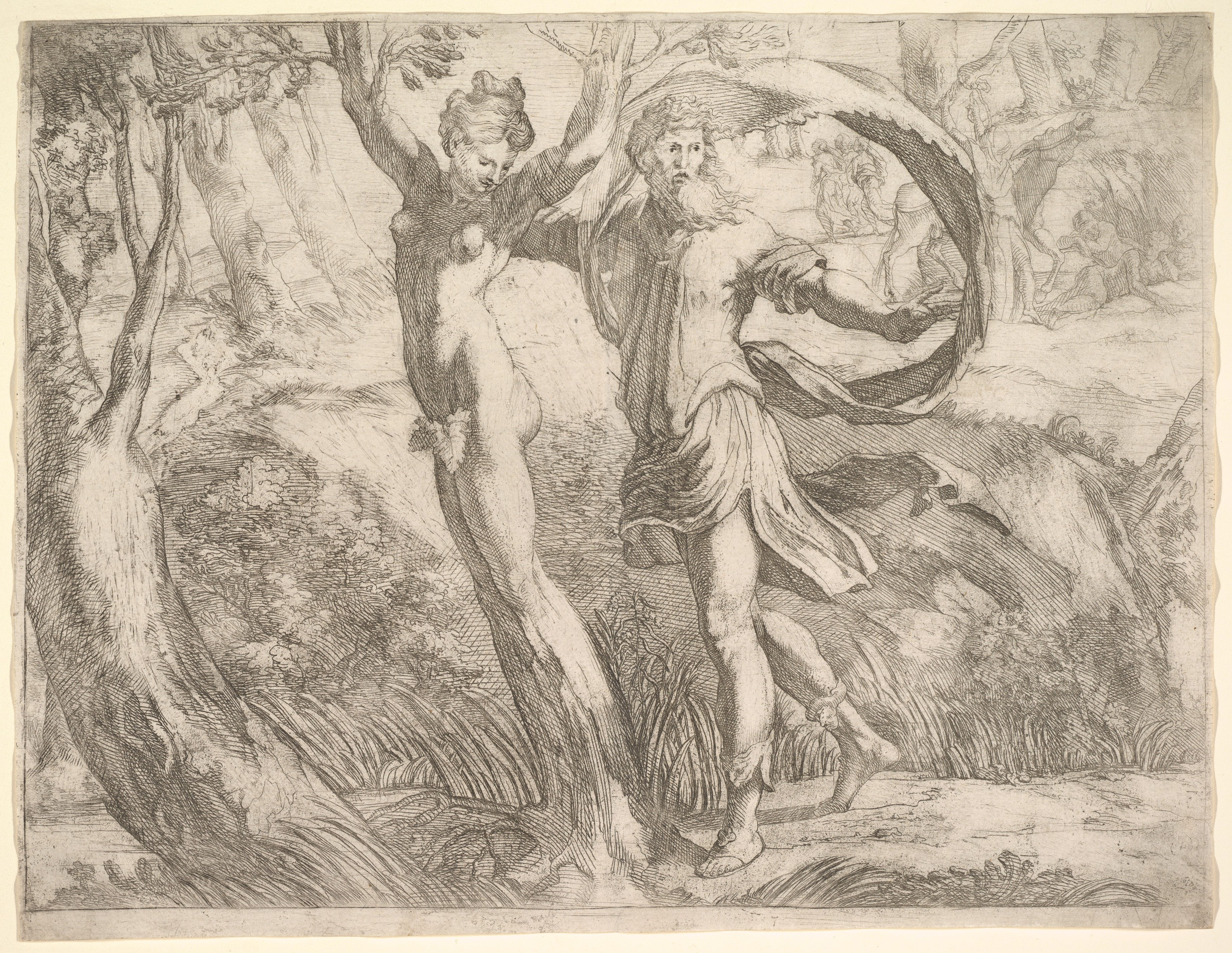
Priapus and Lotis by Wilton Album

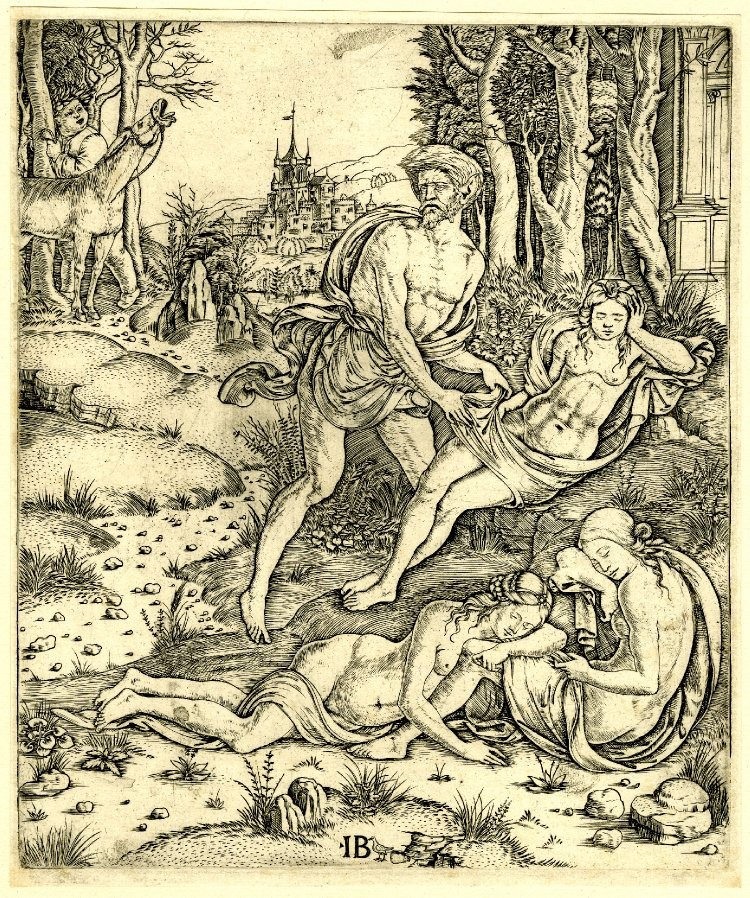
The story of Priapus and Lotis, engraving by Giovanni Battista Palumba, c. 1510

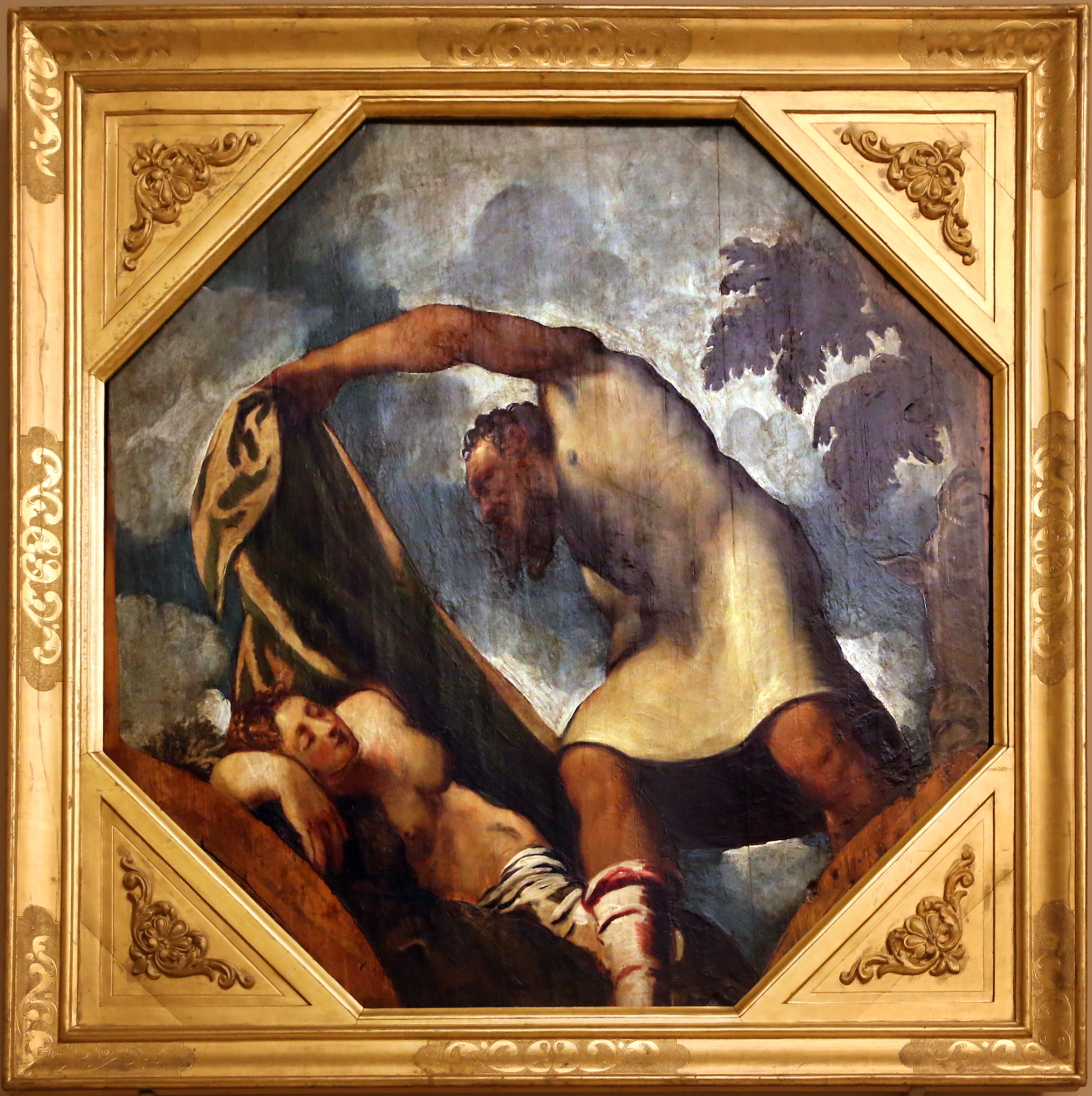
''Priapo Insidia Lotide Addormentata'' by Tintoretto
