= Temple of Priapus =

North American pagan group

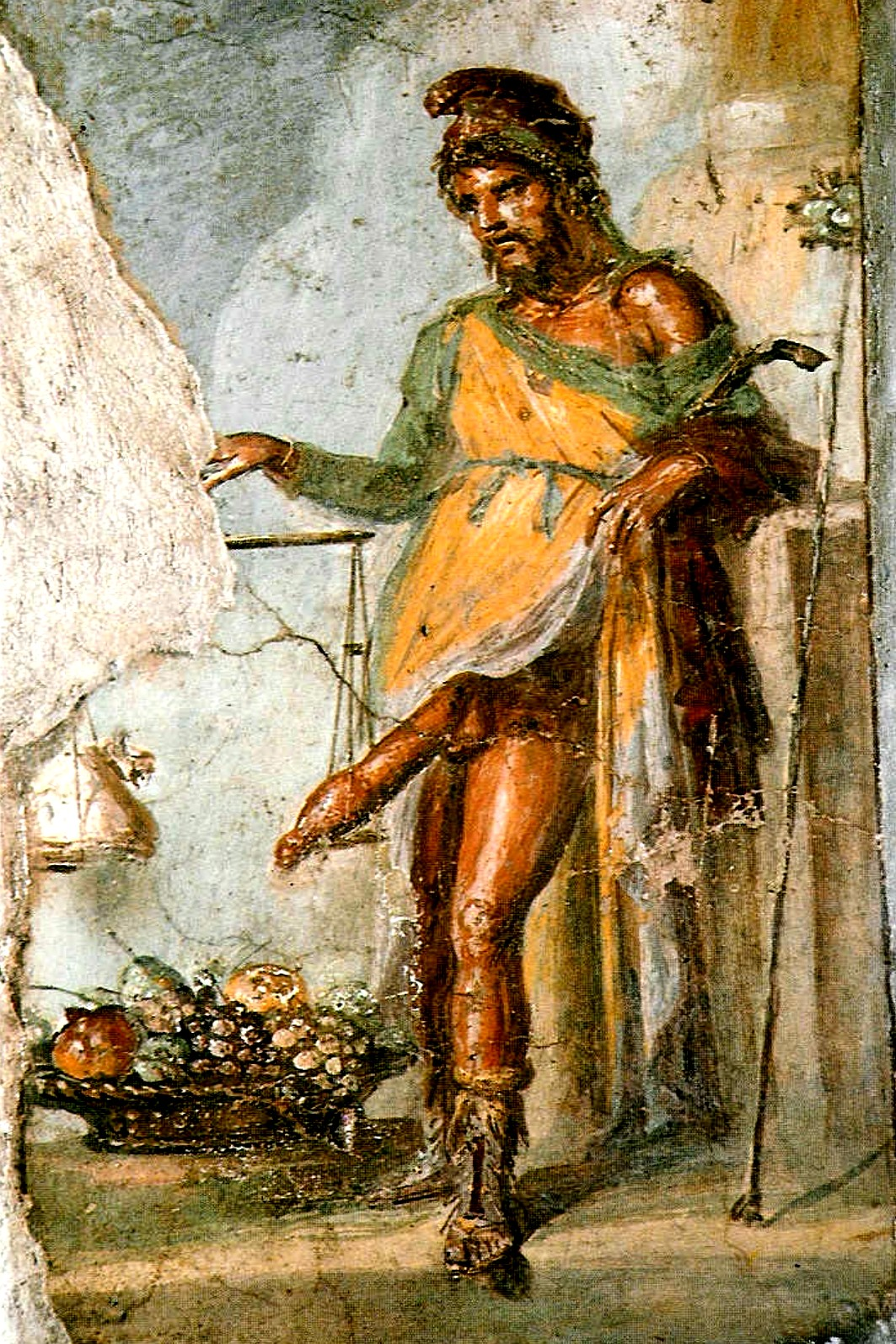
- Priapus, a divine personification of the penis

Founder
- D.F. Cassidy

Regions with significant populations

Religions
- Paganism

Scriptures
- Scripture of the Holy Seed

Languages
- English, French

The Temple of Priapus, also known as the St. Priapus Church (French: Église S. Priape), is a North American pagan religion founded in 1979 that centers on the worship of the phallus.

== Formation and tenets ==
The Temple of Priapus was founded in Montreal, Quebec, by D. F. Cassidy and has found a following mainly among homosexual men in Canada and the United States. The group, which is named after the Greek god Priapus, believes that the phallus is the source of life, beauty, joy, and pleasure.

Cassidy took inspiration for the Montreal temple from a shortly defunct group of the same name he encountered in San Francisco in 1979, which was itself founded in 1973 after another one in Calgary, Alberta in 1972. Cassidy said in 2014 of the San Francisco temple, "They were doing important community outreach, like helping homeless gay youth".

== Ceremonial practices ==
The phallus is to be worshipped, which can be accomplished by a variety of sexual acts, including group masturbation. Semen is also treated with reverence and its consumption is an act of worship. Similarly, fellatio is strongly encouraged; the Temple of Priapus sees it as a commandment, a good deed which has positive effects not just for the recipient but for society in general, a practice facilitating world peace. (Well-fellated men, the group teaches, are less likely to make war.)

== Membership ==
There are nine centres of the group in Canada and eight in the United States. The largest membership resides in San Francisco, California, and it has its headquarters in Montreal.

== See also ==
- Modern pagan views on LGBT people
- New religious movements
- Phallic saint
