= Priapus =

Greek god of fertility and male genitalia

- God of fertility, vegetables, nature, livestock, fruit, beekeeping, sex, genitals, masculinity, and gardens
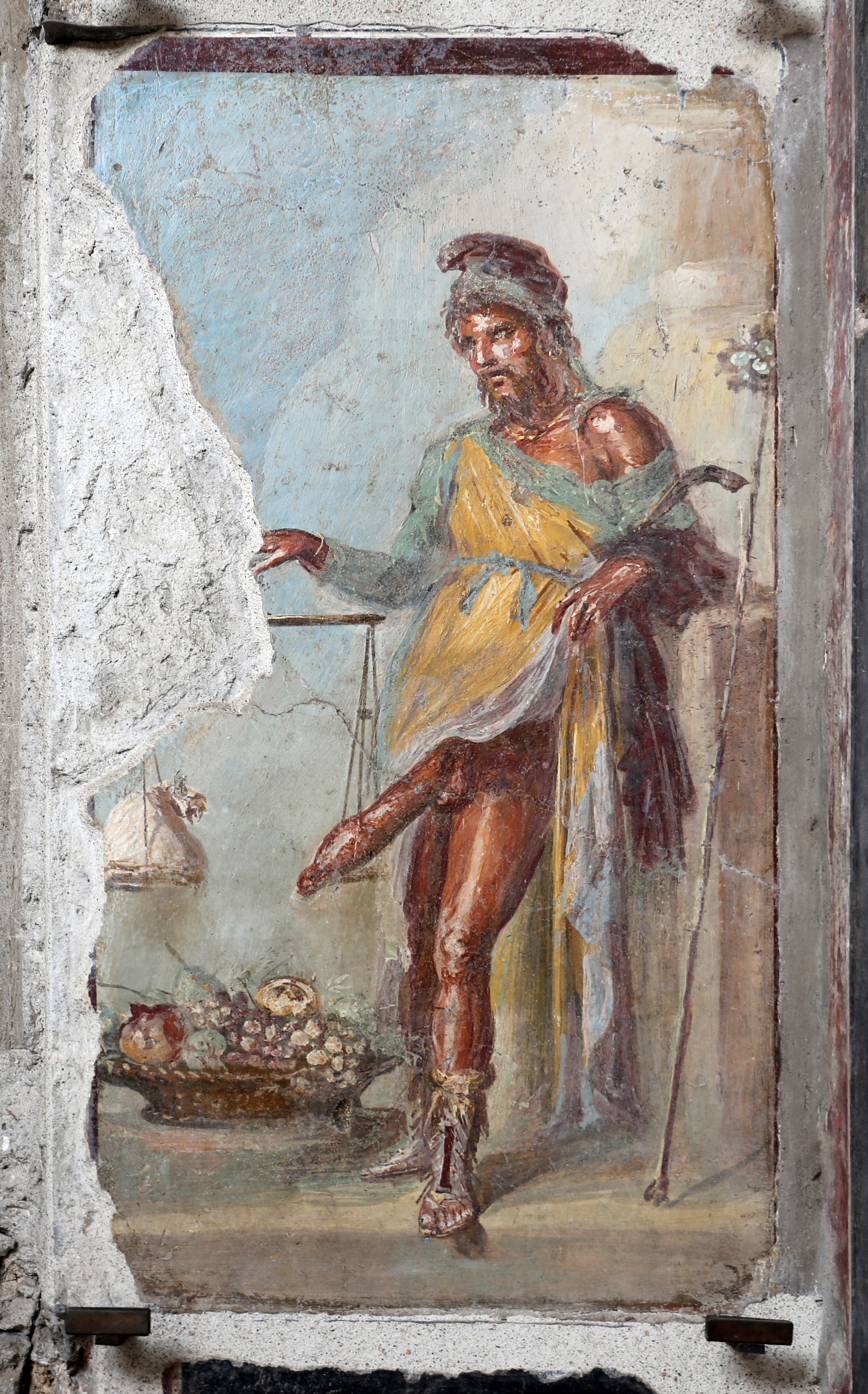
- Fresco of Priapus, House of the Vettii, Pompeii
- Symbol: Donkey, flowers, fruit, vegetables, fish, bees
- Parents: Dionysus and Aphrodite; Hermes and Aphrodite; Dionysus and Chione; Zeus and Aphrodite; Pan

Equivalents
- Roman: Mutunus Tutunus

In Greek mythology, Priapus (/praɪˈeɪpəs/; Ancient Greek: Πρίαπος, romanized: Príapos) is a minor rustic fertility god, protector of livestock, fruit plants, gardens, and male genitalia. Priapus is marked by his oversized penis, and his permanent erection, which gave rise to the medical term priapism. He became a popular figure in Roman erotic art and Latin literature, and is the subject of the often humorously obscene collection of verse called the Priapeia.

== Mythology ==
=== Relationship with other deities ===
Priapus was described in varying sources as the son of Aphrodite by Dionysus; as the son of Dionysus and Chione; as perhaps the father or son of Hermes; or as the son of Zeus or Pan. According to legend, Aphrodite became pregnant by Dionysus, but had been unfaithful to him with Adonis while Dionysus was away on an expedition. When Dionysus returned she went out to meet him, but was ashamed to follow him, and still pregnant with his child, she went to Lampsacus to give birth. Yet Hera, out of jealousy, touched her belly with a bewitched hand and caused the infant to be born ugly and with huge genitals. This child was Priapus, and Aphrodite disowned him because of the unseemliness of his genitals. In another account, Hera's anger and curse were because the baby had been fathered by her husband Zeus. His mother abandoned him on a mountain where he was eventually found by shepherds and was brought up by them.

Priapus joined Pan and the satyrs as a spirit of fertility and growth, and the emblem of his lustful nature was his permanent erection and his large penis. Unlike Pan and the satyrs however, who are part-animal, Priapus is fully human in form, without horns, hooves or a tail; his only anomaly being the oversized penis he has had from birth.

Ancient and modern authors alike have often confused him with other figures of sexuality, including Pan, the satyrs, Hermaphroditus and Dionysus. Strabo describes him by his resemblance to obscure ithyphallic gods such as Orthanes and Tychon.

"Priapos" is a title given to Eros Phanes in the Orphic Hymn to Protogonos, the "firstborn" god of the Greeks who came from the Cosmic Egg. In The Orphic Hymn to Dionysus, Dionysus is given epithets similar to Protogonos and was thought of as the incarnation of Protogonos, so he was considered both the father of fertility god Priapus and also the incarnation of the primordial Priapus.

=== Other works ===
As well as the collection known as the Priapeia mentioned above, Priapus was a frequent figure in Latin erotic or mythological verse.

In Ovid's Fasti, the nymph Lotis fell into a drunken slumber at a feast, and Priapus seized this opportunity to advance upon her. With stealth he approached, and just before he could embrace her, Silenus's donkey alerted the party with "raucous braying". Lotis awoke and pushed Priapus away and fled. To punish the donkey for spoiling his opportunity, Priapus bludgeoned it to death with his gargantuan phallus. When the same story is recounted later in book 6 of Fasti, Lotis is replaced with the virginal goddess Hestia, and the other guests come to her rescue. Another version in Ovid's Metamorphoses states that he pursued the nymph Lotis until the gods took pity on her and turned her into a lotus plant.

The episode gave him a lasting hatred of asses and a willingness to see them killed in his honour. Ovid's anecdote served to explain why donkeys were sacrificed to Priapus in the city of Lampsacus on the Hellespont, where he was worshipped among the offspring of Hermes.

Once, a donkey that had been given human speech by Dionysus challenged Priapus to a contest about which between them had the better penis. Priapus won the contest, and then killed the donkey, which was put by Dionysus among the stars.

In Lucian's Dialogues of the Gods, Priapus conceives a desire for the sleeping Dionysus and attempts to assault him, but the attempt is thwarted when Dionysus wakes up.

== Worship and attributes ==
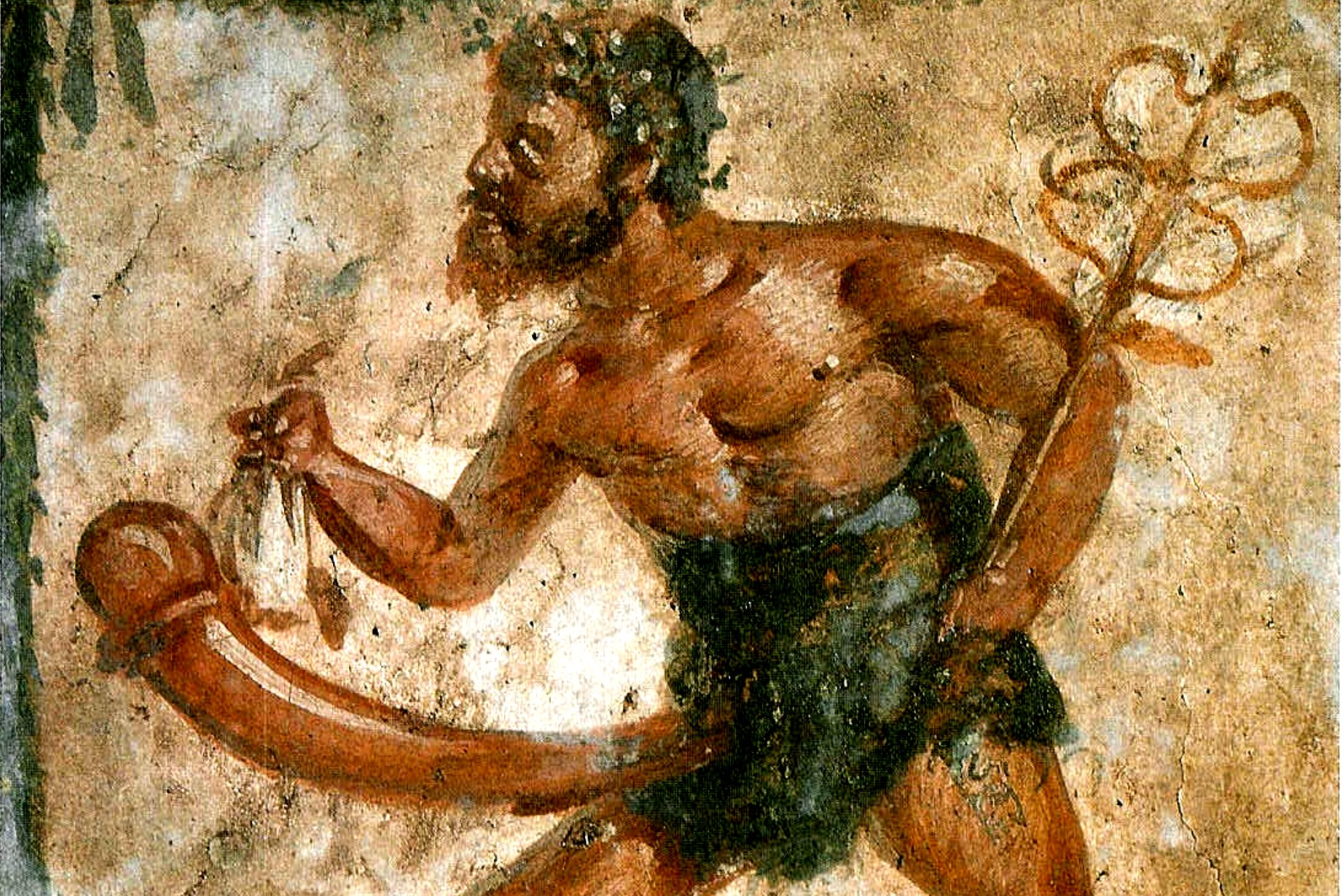
Priapus depicted with the attributes of Mercury in a fresco found at Pompeii

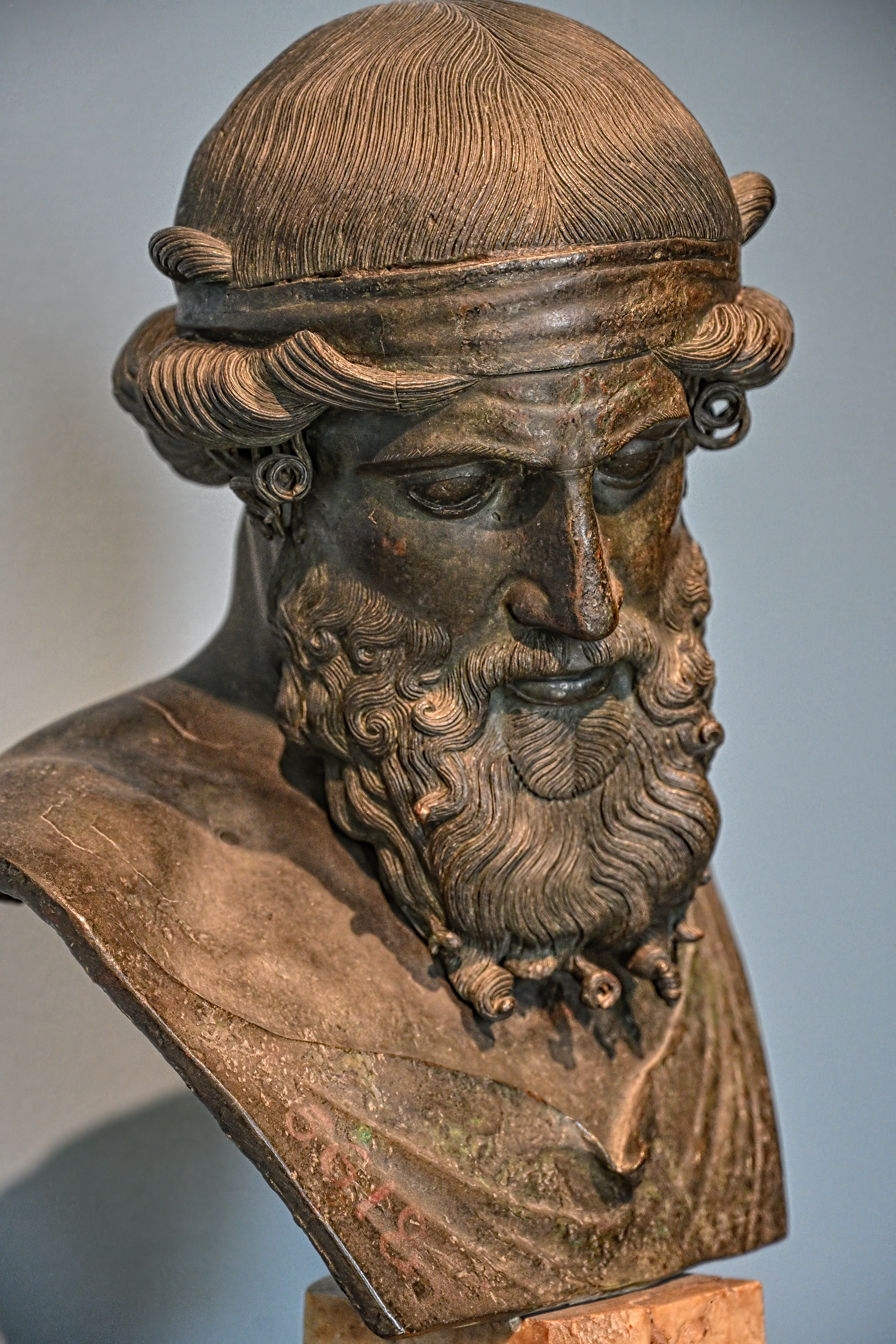
Bronze Bust of Priapus, Roman 100 BC found in the Villa di Papiri in Herculaneum

The first extant mention of Priapus is in the eponymous comedy Priapus, written in the 4th century BC by Xenarchus. Originally worshipped by Greek colonists in Lampsacus in Asia Minor, the cult of Priapus spread to mainland Greece and eventually to Italy during the 3rd century BC. Lucian (De saltatione) tells that in Bithynia Priapus was accounted as a warlike god, a rustic tutor to the infant Ares, "who taught him dancing first and war only afterwards," Karl Kerenyi observed. Arnobius is aware of the importance accorded Priapus in this region near the Hellespont. Also, Pausanias notes:

This god is worshipped where goats and sheep pasture or there are swarms of bees; but by the people of Lampsacus he is more revered than any other god, being called by them a son of Dionysus and Aphrodite.

Scholars disagree on the extent to which Priapus continued to be worshiped in late antiquity. Morford and Lenardon write that "in the jaded society of later antiquity" his worship "meant little more than a cult of sophisticated pornography", but material evidence shows a continued cult in the imperial period. In Roman Dacia, the aediles of Apulum dedicated an altar to Priapus in AD 235, and a colossal Severen-era statue from Napoca was considered "unequivocal evidence of a public cult of Priapus" while a 3rd or 4th century inscription from Rough Cilicia may invoke him as a guardian of crops.

Outside his "home" region in Asia Minor, Priapus was regarded as something of a joke by urban dwellers. However, he played a more important role in the countryside, where he was seen as a guardian deity. He was regarded as the patron god of sailors and fishermen and others in need of good luck, and his presence was believed to avert the evil eye.

Priapus does not appear to have had an organized cult and was mostly worshiped in gardens or homes, though there are attestations of temples dedicated to the god. His sacrificial animal was the ass, but agricultural offerings (such as fruit, flowers, vegetables and fish) were also very common.

Long after the fall of Rome and the rise of Christianity, Priapus continued to be invoked as a symbol of health and fertility. The 13th-century Lanercost Chronicle, a history of northern England and Scotland, records a "lay Cistercian brother" erecting a statue of Priapus (simulacrum Priapi statuere) in an attempt to end an outbreak of cattle disease.

In the 1980s, D. F. Cassidy founded the St. Priapus Church as a modern church centred on worship of the phallus.

=== Patron of merchant sailing ===
Priapus's role as a patron god for merchant sailors in ancient Greece and Rome is that of a protector and navigational aide. Recent shipwreck evidence contains apotropaic items carried on board by mariners in the forms of a terracotta phallus, wooden Priapus figure, and bronze sheath from a military ram. Coinciding with the use of wooden Priapic markers erected in areas of dangerous passage or particular landing areas for sailors, the function of Priapus is much more extensive than previously thought.

Although Priapus is commonly associated with the failed attempts of rape against the nymphs Lotis and Vesta in Ovid's Fasti and the rather flippant treatment of the deity in urban settings, Priapus's protection traits can be traced back to the importance placed on the phallus in ancient times (particularly his association with fertility and garden protection). In Greece, the phallus was thought to have a mind of its own, animal-like, separate from the mind and control of the man. The phallus is also associated with "possession and territorial demarcation" in many cultures, attributing to Priapus's other role as a navigational deity.

== Depictions ==
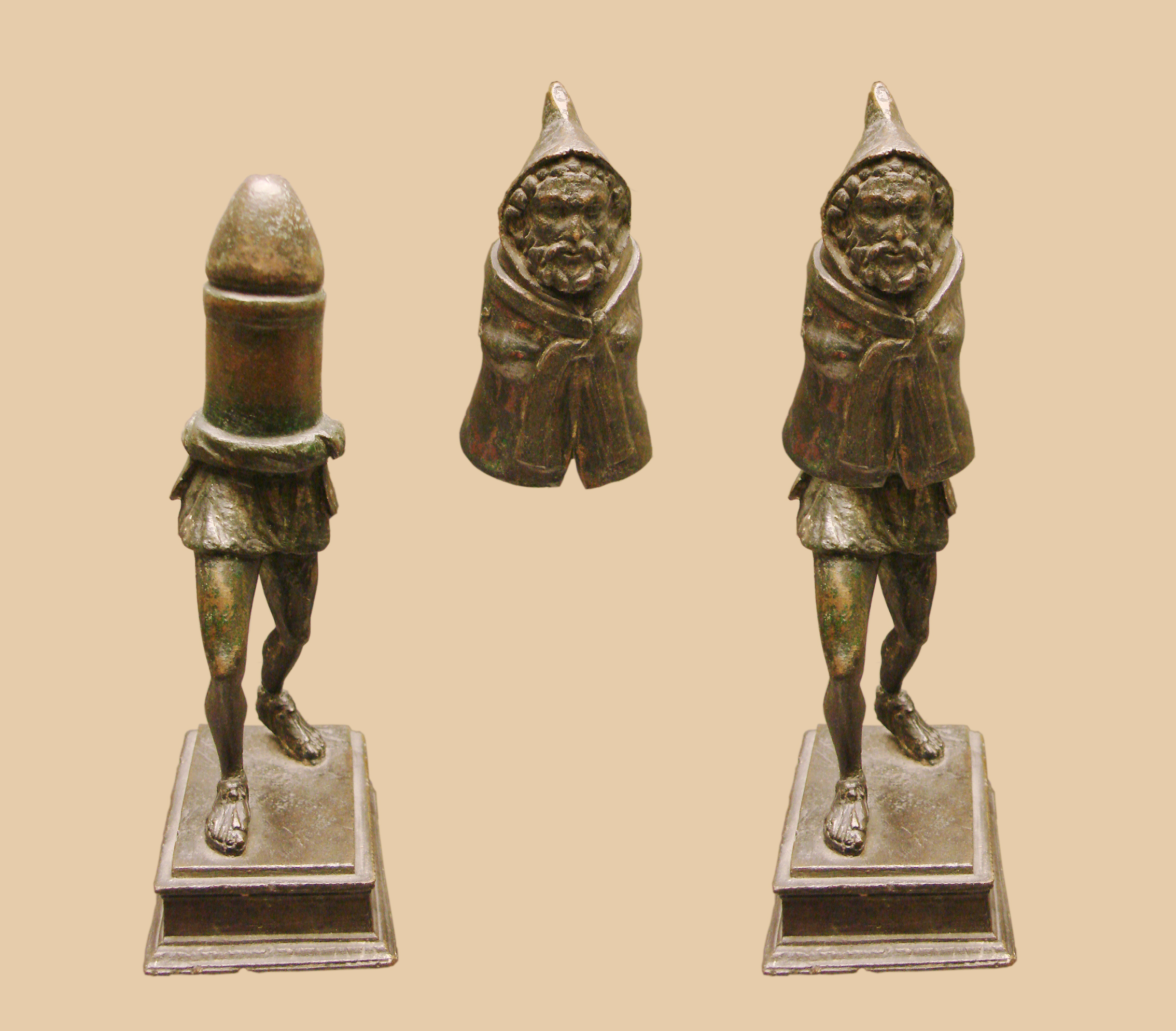
Gallo-Roman bronze statuette (c. 1st century AD) of Priapus (or a Genius cucullatus?) discovered in Picardy, northern France, made in two parts, with the top section concealing a giant phallus.

Priapus's iconic attribute was his priapism (permanently erect penis); he probably absorbed some pre-existing ithyphallic deities as his cult developed. He was represented in a variety of ways, most commonly as a misshapen gnome-like figure with an enormous erect phallus; in Priapea 11 and 28, his phallus is described as a foot long. Statues of Priapus were common in ancient Greece and Rome, standing in gardens. The Athenians often conflated Priapus with Hermes, the god of boundaries, and depicted a hybrid deity with a winged helmet, sandals, and huge erection.

Another attribute of Priapus was the sickle which he often carries in his right hand. This tool was used to threaten thieves, doubtless with castration; Horace (Sat. 1.8.1–7) writes:

Olim truncus eram ficulnus, inutile lignum,
cum faber, incertus scamnum faceretne Priapum,
maluit esse deum. deus inde ego, furum aviumque
maxima formido; nam fures dextra coercet
obscenoque ruber porrectus ab inguine palus;
ast importunes volucres in vertice harundo
terret fixa vetatque novis considere in hortis.

Translation:

Once I was a trunk of fig, a useless piece of wood,
when a carpenter, unsure whether he should make a bench or a Priapus,
decided to make a god. So I am a god, of thieves and birds
a very great scarer; for my right hand curbs thieves,
as does the red pole which projects from my indecent groin;
but as for the importunate birds, the reed fixed on my head
terrifies them and forbids them to settle in the new gardens.

A number of epigrams, apparently written as if to adorn shrines of Priapus, were collected in the Priapeia. In these, Priapus frequently threatens sexual assault against potential thieves:

Percidere, puer, moneo; futuere, puella;
barbatum furem tertia poena manet.

Translation:

I warn you, boy, you will be screwed; girl, you will be laid with;
a third penalty awaits the bearded thief.

Femina si furtum faciet mihi virve puerve,
haec cunnum, caput hic praebeat, ille nates.

Translation:

If a woman steals from me, or a man, or a boy,
let the first give me her cunt, the second his head, the third his buttocks.

per medios ibit pueros mediasque puellas
mentula; barbatis non-nisi summa petet.

Translation:

My dick will go through the middle of boys and the middle of girls,
but with bearded men it will aim only for the top.

A number of Roman paintings of Priapus have survived. One of the most famous images of Priapus is that from the House of the Vettii in Pompeii. A fresco depicts the god weighing his phallus against a large bag of coins. In nearby Herculaneum, an excavated snack bar has a painting of Priapus behind the bar, apparently as a good-luck symbol for the customers.

== Modern derivations ==
=== Medical terminology ===
The medical condition priapism derives its name from Priapus, alluding to the god's permanently engorged penis.

=== Natural history ===
- The group of worm-like marine burrowing animals known as the Priapulidea derives their name from Priapus.
- Mutinus caninus, a woodland fungus, draws its first name from Priapus's Roman name (Mutunus Tutunus), due to its phallic shape.

== See also ==
- Tintinnabulum (Ancient Rome)
- Latin obscenity
- Sexuality in ancient Rome
- Karabiga, Turkey, formerly known as Priapus
- Richard Payne Knight
- Orchis
- Orthanes
- Priapism
- Temple of Priapus
