= Beekse Bergen =

Beekse Bergen may refer to:

- Safaripark Beekse Bergen
- Speelland Beekse Bergen
