= Baarschot =

Baarschot can refer to several hamlets in North Brabant, the Netherlands

- Baarschot, Deurne
- Baarschot, Hilvarenbeek
- Baarschot, Oosterhout
