= Baarschot, Hilvarenbeek =

Baarschot Baorschot (Brabantian)
- Hamlet
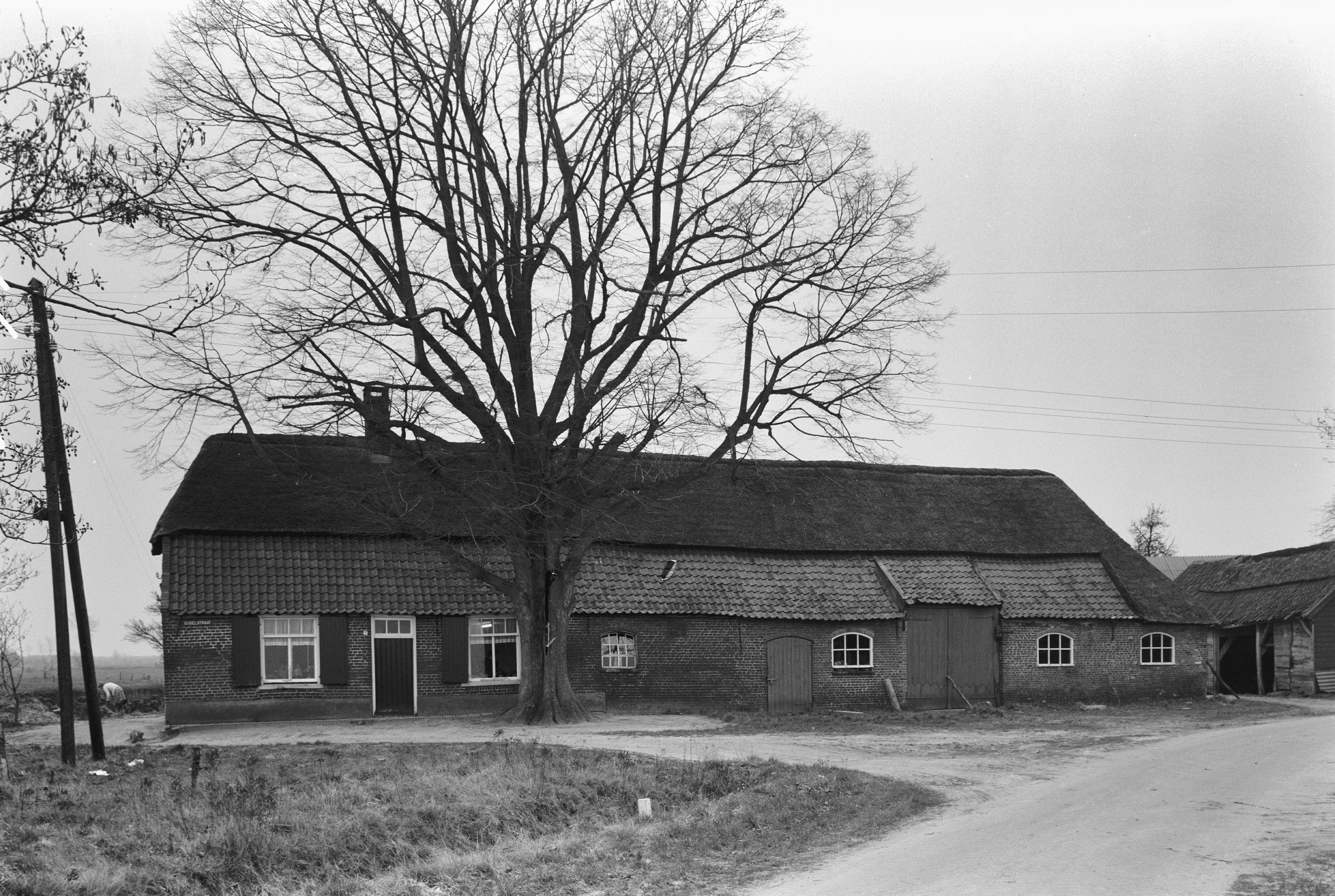
- Monumental farm in Baarschot, 1964

- Location in the province of North Brabant in the Netherlands Location in the Netherlands
- Coordinates: 51°27′N 5°11′E
- Country: Netherlands
- Province: North Brabant
- Municipality: Hilvarenbeek
- Village: Diessen
- Elevation: 18.6 m (61 ft)

Population (2023)
  - Total: 275
- Time zone: UTC+1 (CET)
  - Summer (DST): UTC+2 (CEST)
- Postcode: 5087
- Area code: 013

Baarschot (Dutch pronunciation: [ˈbaːr.sxɔt]; Brabantian: Baorschot) is a hamlet in the municipality of Hilvarenbeek in the province of North Brabant in the Netherlands. In contrast to many other hamlets in the Netherlands, Baarschot does have an official built-up area and thus also standard blue town signs. Administratively, it is part of Diessen.

== Etymology ==
The hamlet was first attested as Baescot in 1301. It is probably a compound of an uncertain first element and schot (“enclosed space, fenced-in territory”).

== Economy ==
Although Baarschot has traditionally been an agricultural community, tourism and catering are now also important means of livelihood. There are two holiday parks, a large camping site, and a group accommodation. From 1990 to 1995, Baarschot had a horse tram that took day trippers from the campsites around the municipality.

== Nature ==
The Reusel flows right past Baarschot. There are still some carrs along this river. The hamlet of Heieind is located south of Baarschot in a heathland reclamation area. The Moleneind leads to the place on the Reusel where a watermill used to stand, called the Achterste Molen ('Rear Mill'). It is mentioned as early as the 15th century but fell into disrepair in the 19th century. The Voorste Molen ('Front Mill') was located in Diessen.

== Sights ==
- Mariagrot ('Mary's Grotto') on the Baarschotsestraat from 1945. This cave was built in gratitude for the fact that there were no casualties in Baarschot as a result of the Second World War. It is made of boulders from the nearby De Utrecht Estate.
- Some long facade farmhouses from the 18th century.
- In de Brouwerij ('In the Brewery') is a historic building from 1717, which used to house a brewery. An arched cellar and a pulley are still present from that time. Het Wit Kruis was brewed here from around 1850. In 1949 the brewery stopped production. It has been a catering facility since 1982.
