= Johannes Goropius Becanus =

Dutch physician, linguist, and humanist

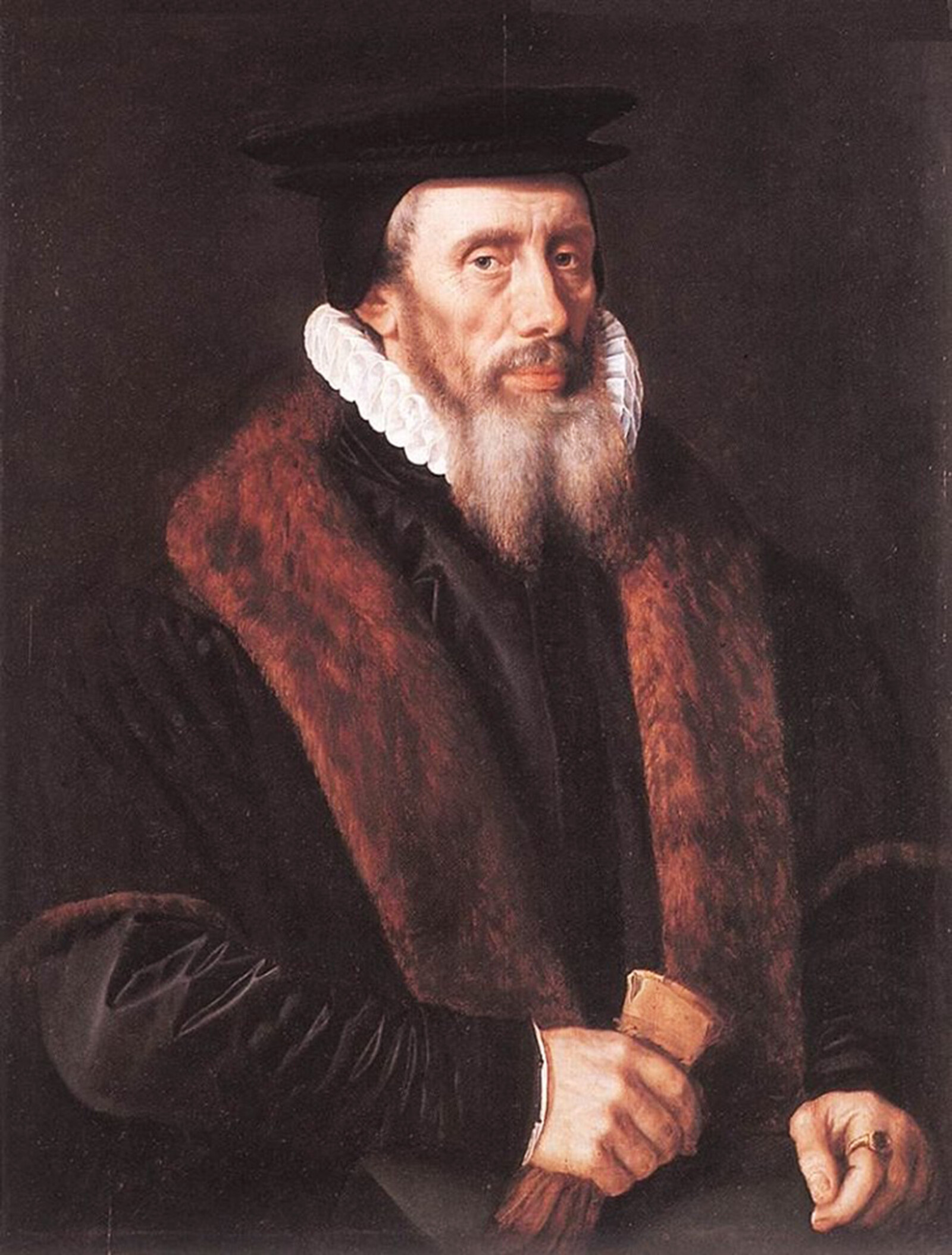
Johannes Goropius Becanus (officially: Portrait of a man by Adriaen Thomasz Key, Groeningemuseum)

Johannes Goropius Becanus (/joʊˈhɑːnɪs ɡəˈroʊpiəs bəˈkeɪnəs/; 23 June 1519 – 28 June 1573), born Jan Gerartsen, was a Dutch physician, linguist, and humanist.

== Life ==
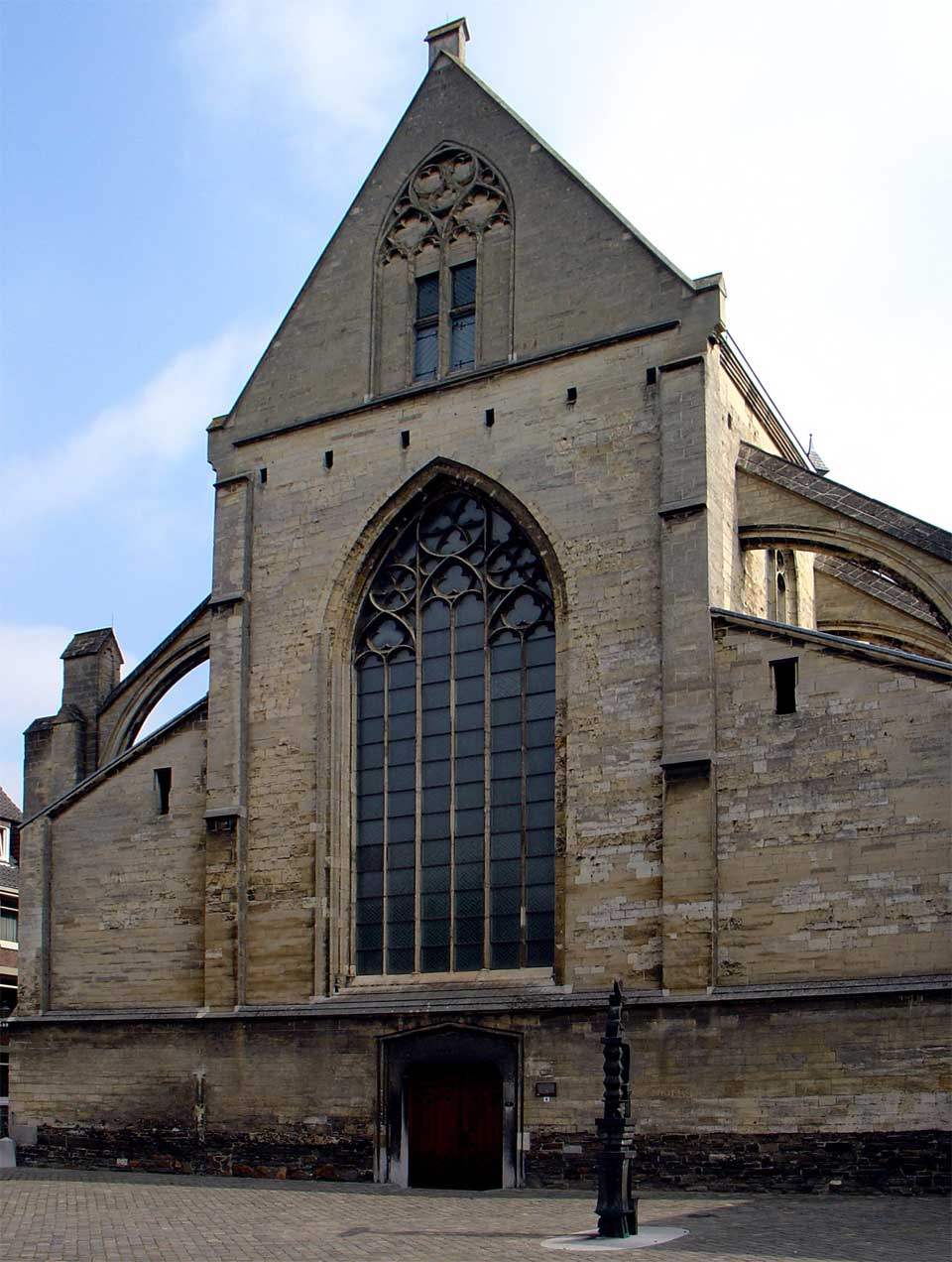
Church of the friars minor, where his epitaph can still be seen

He was born Jan Gerartsen van Gorp in the hamlet of Gorp, in the municipality of Hilvarenbeek. As was the fashion of the time, Gerartsen adopted a Latinized surname based on the name of his birthplace, Goropius being rendered from "Van Gorp"' and Becanus referring to "Hilvarenbeek."

He studied medicine in Leuven, and became physician to two sisters of Charles V: Mary of Austria and Eleanor of Austria, who were based in Brussels at the time. Philip II, Charles V's son, also wanted to appoint him as his own physician and offered him a rich income. Goropius, however, refused and established himself as medicus (town doctor) of Antwerp in 1554. Here, free of courtly intrigues, Goropius dedicated what time he could completely to languages and etymology, studying antiquity and becoming fluent in many languages.

Goropius died in Maastricht, where he was buried in the old Franciscan church.

== Linguistic theories ==
Goropius theorized that Antwerpian Brabantic, a particular dialect of Dutch spoken in the region between the Scheldt and Meuse Rivers, was the original language spoken in Paradise. Goropius believed that the most ancient language on Earth would be the simplest language, and that the simplest language would contain mostly short words. Since Brabantic has a higher number of short words than do Latin, Greek, and Hebrew, Goropius reasoned that it was the older language.

A corollary of this theory was that all languages derived ultimately from Brabantic. For example, Goropius derived the Latin word for "oak", quercus, from werd-cou (Brabantic for "keeps out cold"). Similarly, he derived the Hebrew name "Noah" from nood ("need"). Goropius also believed that Adam and Eve were Brabantic names (from Hath-Dam, or "dam against hate", for "Adam", and from Eu-Vat ("barrel from which people originated") or Eet-Vat ("oath-barrel") for "Eve", respectively). Another corollary involved locating the Garden of Eden itself in the Brabant region. In the book known as Hieroglyphica, Goropius also allegedly proved to his own satisfaction that Egyptian hieroglyphics represented Brabantic.

== Origines Antwerpianae ==
In spite of his extensive travels in Italy, Spain, France, Germany and Britain, Goropius remained attached to his homeland, and reported on various curiosities and customs from his native region. In his Origines Antwerpianae (1569), a treatise describing the antiquities of Antwerp, Goropius reports various curiosities, among them that a youth almost nine feet tall and a woman about ten feet tall lived near his home. He also reports that Ters, a deity who seems to have been an equivalent of Priapus, was invoked by Antwerpian women when they were taken by surprise or sudden fear, and that there was a house in Antwerp adjoining the prison of Het Steen that bore a statue which had been furnished with a large worn away phallus.

== Legacy ==
Christoffel Plantijn had been a friend of Goropius's and the Antwerp-based printing house known as the Plantin Press, which first published Goropius's works in 1569, printed the linguist-physician's posthumous collected work in 1580 as a massive volume of more than a thousand pages. Goropius's work was met with a mixture of ridicule and admiration. Goropius is considered to have given Dutch linguistics, and Gothic philology in general, a bad name. Though Goropius had admirers (among them Abraham Ortelius and Richard Hakluyt), his etymologies have been considered "linguistic chauvinism," and Gottfried Wilhelm Leibniz coined the French word goropiser, meaning "to come up with absurd etymologies", in his work Nouveaux essais sur l'entendement humain (New Essays on Human Understanding; written 1704, published 1765). Justus Lipsius and Hugo Grotius discounted Goropius's linguistic theories. "Never have I read greater nonsense," the scholar Joseph Scaliger wrote of Goropius's etymologies. Goropius has lent his name to the English word goropism, meaning "a discredited hypothesis, similar to the one originally propounded by Goropius, that some attested or modern language was the original language of human beings" and "an absurd etymology proposed as part of such a hypothesis".

== See also ==
- Indo-European languages

== Sources ==
- "Digitized primary sources and secondary information on the wiki Hortus Linguarum".
- "Eerherstel voor Goropius Becanus door Nicoline van der Sijs" [Reparation for Goropius Becanus by Nicoline van der Sijs] (in Dutch).
- How come we can't decipher the Indus script? (Straight Dope article containing reference to Goropius)
- (in French) Droixhe, D., La linguistique et l'appel de l'histoire. Rationalisme et révolutions positivistes, Genève, Droz, 1987.
- (in French) Droixhe, D., Souvenirs de Babel. La reconstruction de l’histoire des langues de la Renaissance aux Lumières, Bruxelles, ARLLFB, 2007.
- Naborn, R. A., Etymologies in Joannes Goropius Becanus' Hermathena. Master's Thesis, University of Kansas, 1989.
- Naborn, R. A., 'Becanus' Etymological Methods', in: Voortgang 15:79-86 .
- (in Dutch) Van Hal, T., “Moedertalen en taalmoeders”. Het vroegmoderne taalvergelijkende onderzoek in de Lage Landen, Brussels, 2010, 77–140.
- Frederickx, Eddy; Hal, Toon van (2015). Johannes Goropius Becanus (1519-1573). Brabants arts en taalfanaat [Johannes Goropius Becanus (1519-1573). Brabant doctor and language fanatic] (in Dutch). Hilversum: Verloren.
- "Cultureel Brabant" [Cultural Brabant] (in Dutch).
- Adam, Melchior (1615–1620). Vitae (in Latin). pp. 190–192.
