= Hilvarenbeek =

- Municipality
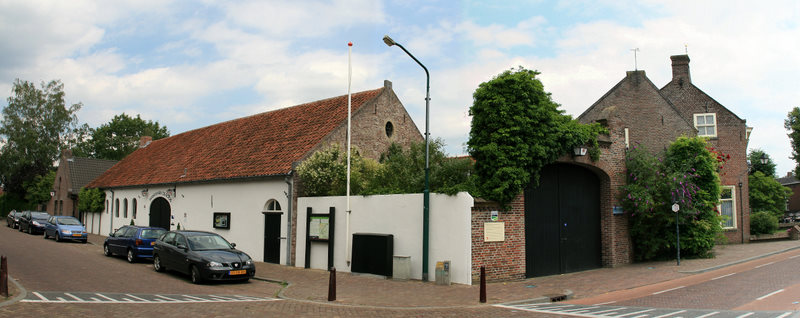
- Former brewery now museum in Hilvarenbeek

- Flag Coat of arms

- Location in North Brabant
- Coordinates: 51°29′N 5°8′E
- Country: Netherlands
- Province: North Brabant

Government
  - Body: Municipal council
  - Mayor: Harrie Nuijten (acting) (PvdA)

Area
  - Total: 96.51 km^{2} (37.26 sq mi)
  - Land: 94.85 km^{2} (36.62 sq mi)
  - Water: 1.66 km^{2} (0.64 sq mi)
- Elevation: 18 m (59 ft)

Population (January 2021)
  - Total: 15,698
  - Density: 166/km^{2} (430/sq mi)
- Time zone: UTC+1 (CET)
  - Summer (DST): UTC+2 (CEST)
- Postcode: 5080–5089
- Area code: 013
- Website: www.hilvarenbeek.nl

Hilvarenbeek (Dutch pronunciation: [ɦɪlˌvaːrə(m)ˈbeːk]) is a municipality and a town in the south of the Netherlands, along the border with Belgium.

The biggest tourist attraction is called Beekse Bergen, consisting of a safari park, amusement park/playground, holiday bungalow park, and camping parks.

In the centre of the town the Sint-Petrus'-Banden is a Gothic church from the 14th and 15th centuries. The tower is a highlight of the Kempen Gothic.

== Population centres ==
The municipality of Hilvarenbeek also includes the following villages with their own churches:

- Baarschot (village-like hamlet without church but a Maria cave)
- Biest-Houtakker
- Diessen
- Esbeek
- Haghorst

In addition, the following parts were historically separate, but are nowadays more like neighbourhoods:

- Beerten
- Driehuizen
- Dun
- Gorp
- Groenstraat
- Groot Loo
- Grote Voort
- Hoog Spul
- Hoogeind
- Klein Loo
- Kleine Voort
- Laag Spul
- Rovert
- Slibbroek
- Westerwijk

=== Topography ===
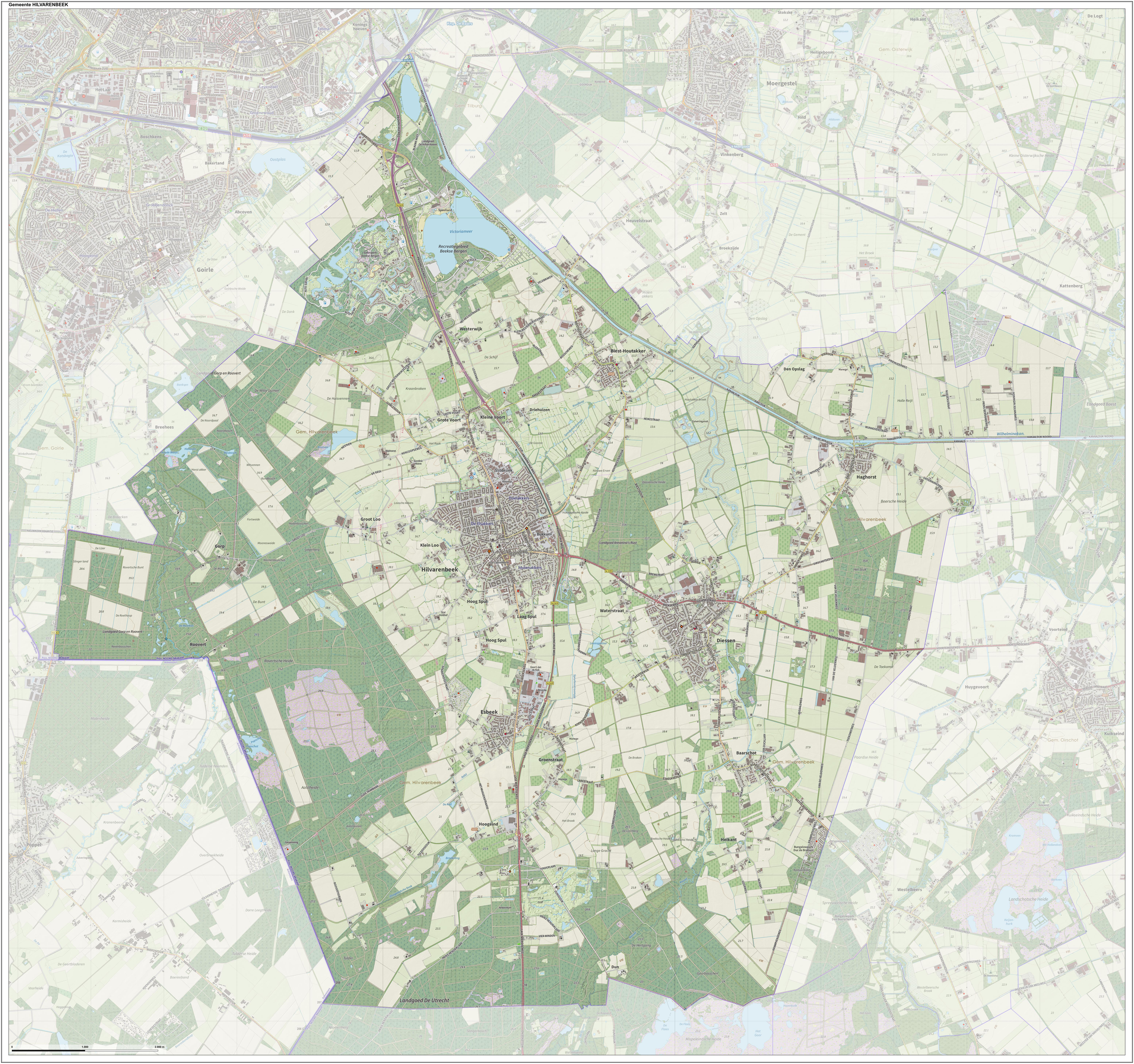

Dutch Topographic map of the municipality of Hilvarenbeek, June 2015.

== Notable people ==
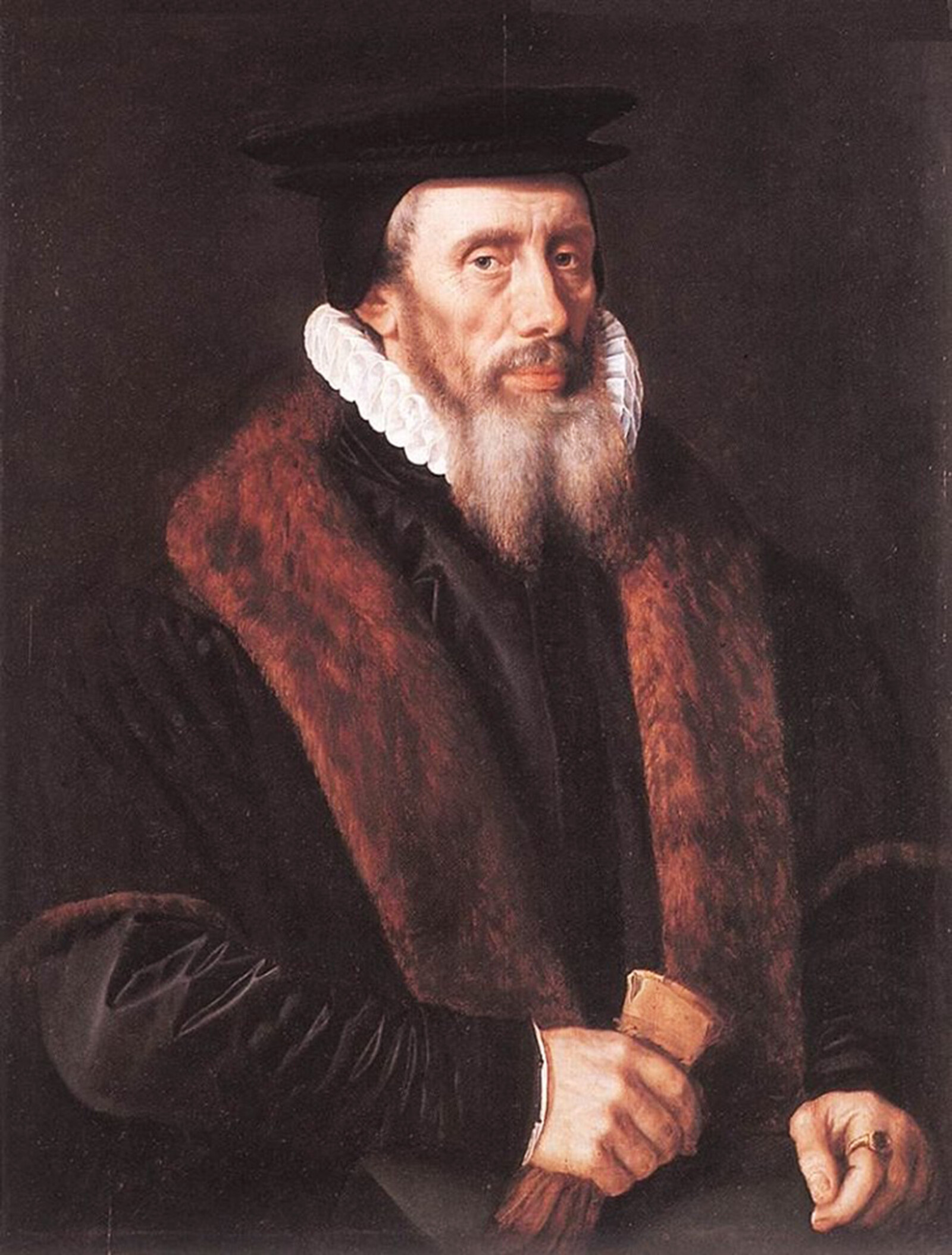
J G Becanus

- Johannes Goropius Becanus (1519 in Gorp – 1573) physician, linguist, and humanist
- Martinus Becanus (1563 in Hilvarenbeek – 1624) a Jesuit priest, theologian and controversialist.
- Jacques Thomassen (born 1945 in Diessen) organizational theorist and academic
- Henny Vrienten (born 1948 in Hilvarenbeek – 2022) pop artist (Doe Maar) and composer of TV and film scores
- Annie Abrahams (born 1954 in Hilvarenbeek) performance artist in video installations and the internet
- Henk Baars (born 1960 in Diessen) cyclo-cross cyclist
- Ronald van Raak (born 1969 in Hilvarenbeek) politician, non-fiction writer and former academic

== Gallery ==
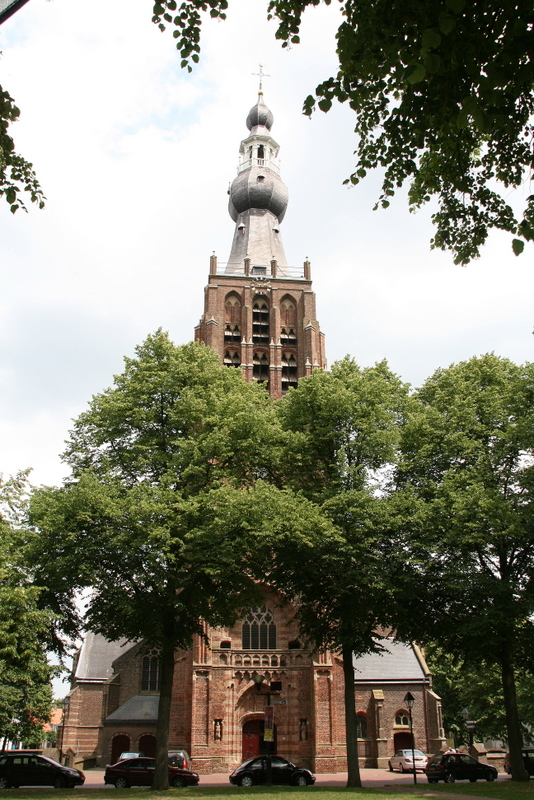
Hilvarenbeek, St. Petrus-Bandenkerk

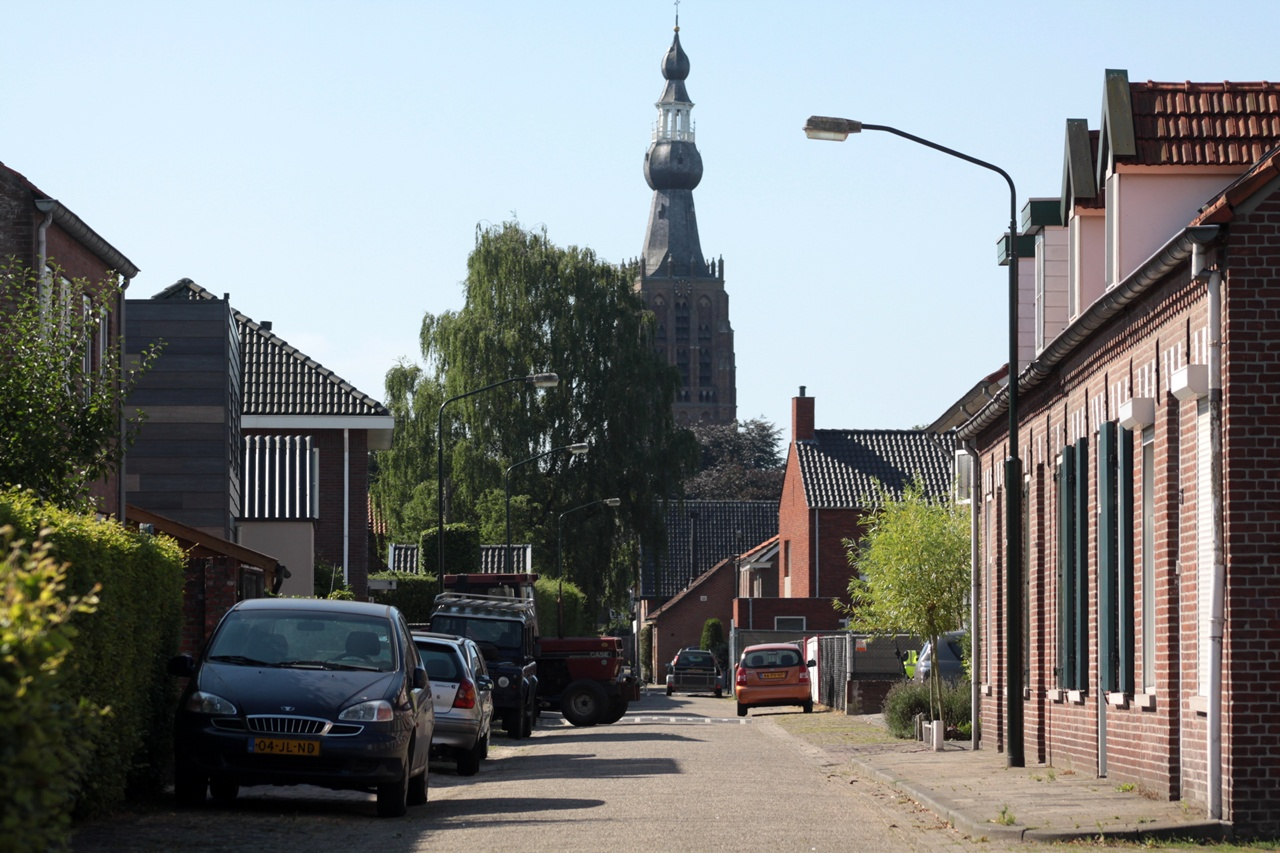
Zicht op de Sint-Petrus' Bandenkerk (Hilvarenbeek)

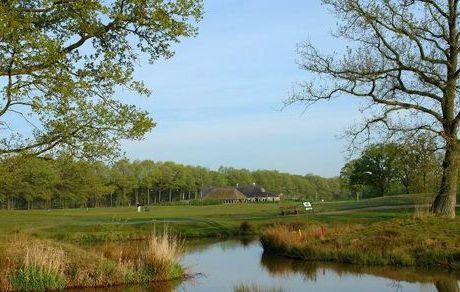
Midden-Brabant

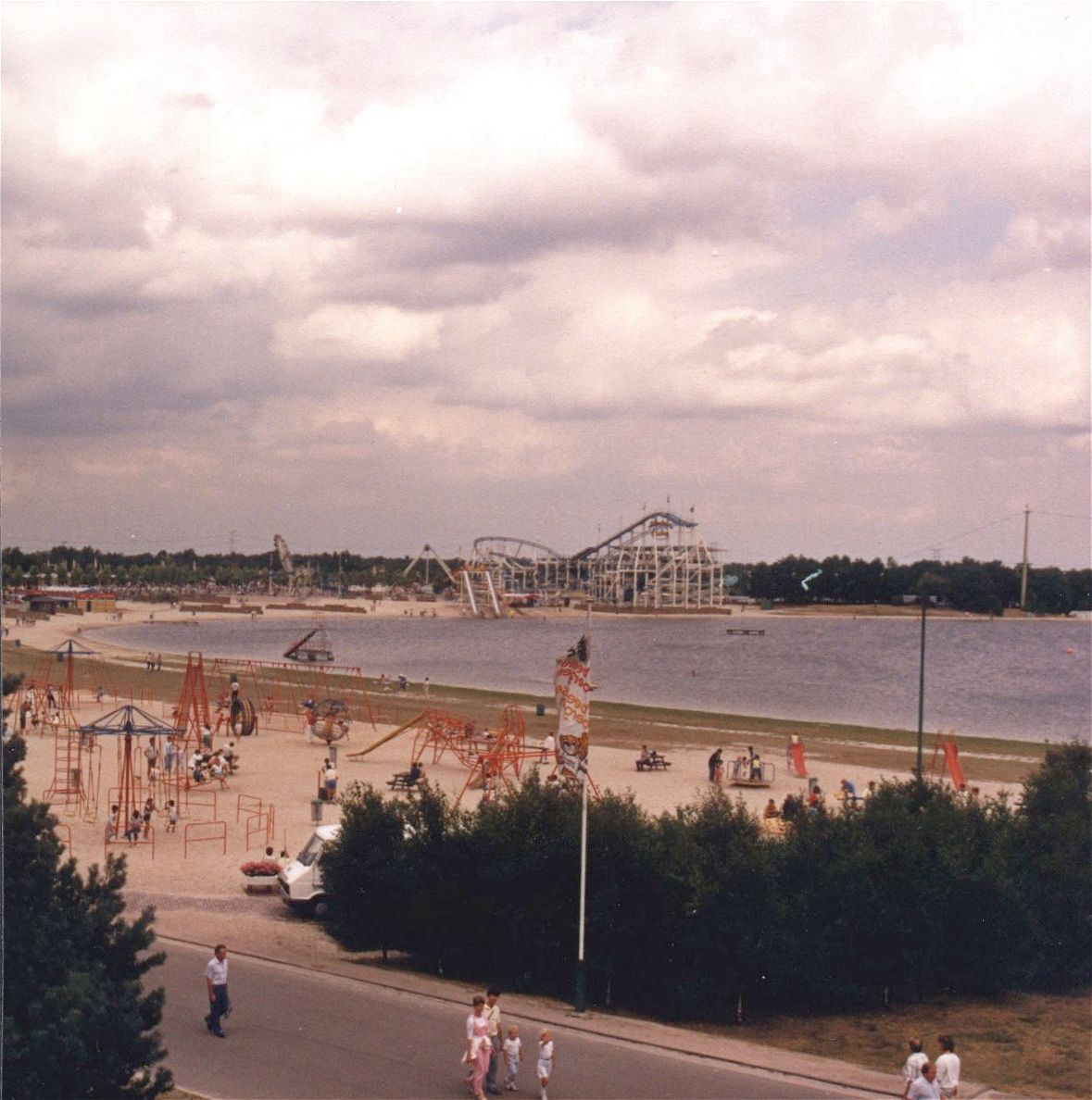
Rollercoaster at De Beekse Bergen (1986)

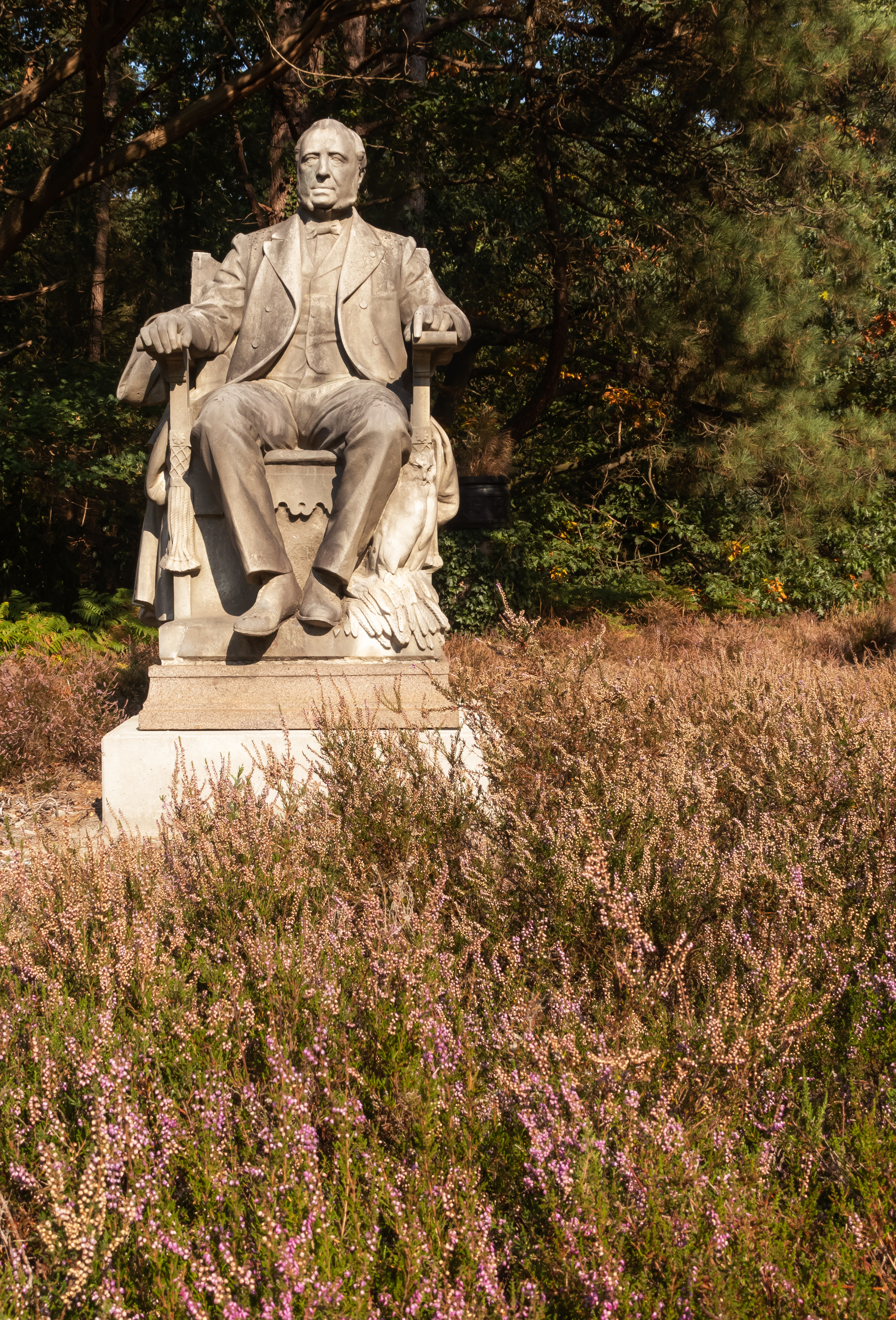
Statue in Esbeek
