= Gorp, Netherlands =

Coordinates: 51°29′N 5°05′E

Gorp is a hamlet in the municipality of Hilvarenbeek, in the south of the Netherlands near its border with Belgium. Once historically separate from Hilvarenbeek, it has become a de facto neighborhood of the larger town.

The Gorp forest area was turned into a "fairytale forest" during the annual children's holiday week in August 2019.

== Origins ==
Gorp was the birthplace of physician, linguist, and humanist Johannes Goropius Becanus (1519–1572), whose Latinized surname is derived from the town's name.
