= Andreas Schotel =

Dutch artist

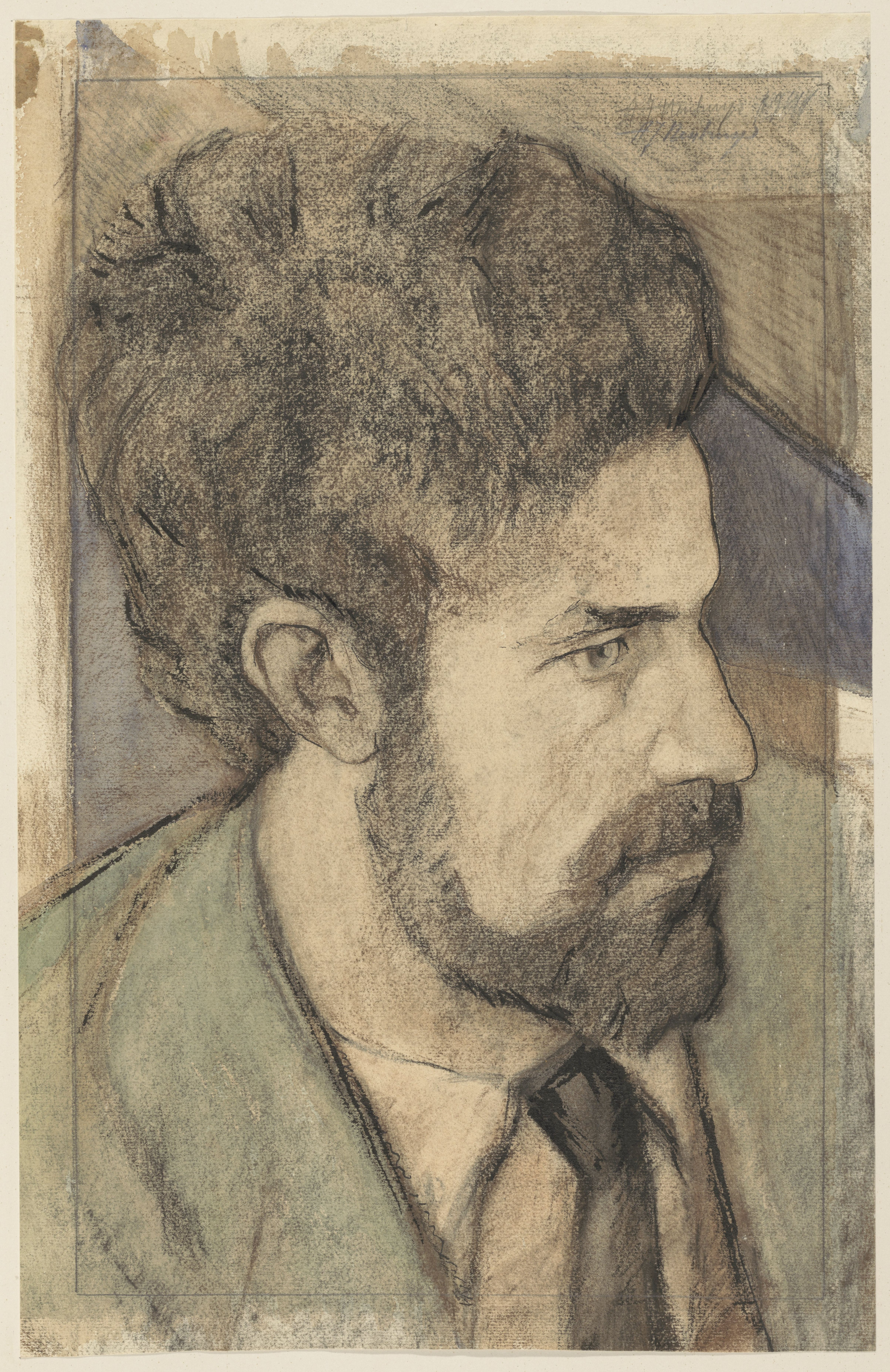
Portrait of Andreas Schotel Estimate Date: 1940

Andreas Schotel (1896-1984) was a respected Dutch graphic artist. He made many etchings of the life and work of the farmers and farm workers from North Brabant. He also meticulously documented the transition from traditional to mechanized operations.

He was married to Mies Gips. They had three daughters, one of whom, however, died at a young age. Schotel's relatives emigrated throughout the world - splitting between the Netherlands and the United Kingdom.

Emigrating throughout numerous countries due to the World War, in Germany occupied Belgium where Schotel's father Petrus Johannes Schotel was located.

== Biography ==
Andreas Schotel was born in Rotterdam, 1896, the son of a baker. From the age of fourteen he worked as a pattern designer at a Rotterdam carpet factory. During the First World War he was stationed in North Brabant near the border of Belgium occupied by Germany. In 1916 he was released from service and then attended the Rotterdam Art Academy. There he qualified in graphic arts, in particular etching. Together with Johannes Proost, with whom he entered into an artistic and political (communist) alliance, he was taught by, among others, the Rotterdam graphic artist Antoon Derkzen van Angeren. As with Derkzen van Angeren, their attention was focused on ports, industry and simplified landscapes. Both were great admirers of the 17th-century Hercules Seghers.

In 1922, through the director of the Kralingse gas factory, he came in contact with his brother, Cornelis Sissingh. He was a forester on the Landgoed de Utrecht. He was allowed to live here for free near the fire tower in Esbeek. He made a portrait of Director Ingenegeren. However, he hardly sold anything and after a year the family had to return.

However, he longed for Esbeek and purchased a garden shed that was transferred to Esbeek in 1923. The family spent the summer months in this two-by-two-meter house. The cottage was placed close to the foreman's home of the Orange Association of Order, which the Rovertsche Heide had mined. Electricity was taken from here and water was taken from a well.

Saucer was a Communist and thus an odd man out, but contact with the local population showed mutual respect. Esbeek already knew a number of immigrants, such as Protestant farmers who were attracted by the mining companies because of their knowledge of modern farming methods. Below were a few families from Zuid-Beveland who even kept wearing their traditional costumes.

The art of Schotel was naturalistic. The etchings of Schotel show the landscape and the working people. The latter were portrayed from the beauty of the work and not so much as an indictment of poverty. His etchings offer accurate time documents about everything that was once normal but gradually disappeared to make way for new things (primitive threshing machines, for example) that in their turn also disappeared.

Andreas was friends with artist Jan van der Heijden from Netersel and with J.M. Lauwers, headmaster of Esbeek and writer of Langs de Hilverboorden, for which he produced ten etchings.

Together with Johannes Proost, he developed the technique of the printed etching. Hereby work was done with self-burned varnish instead of ink. Wood soot was used as the pigment. He developed the mari, a tool that removed the ink from the etching plate but left it intact in the slots.

== Recognition ==
Andreas Schotel only found recognition in old age. In 1979 the Friends of Andreas Schotel Foundation was established in Esbeek. This also lends etchings to the people of Esbeek. In May 2009 the Andreas Schotel Museum was opened in Esbeek in the Schuttershof, an institution where the artist also regularly visited.

The summer house, called De Schuttel, still exists. Since the purchase of the Rovertsche Heide by the Brabant Landscape Foundation, it has been relocated 200 meters and it may have a cultural purpose.
