= Esbeek =

- Village
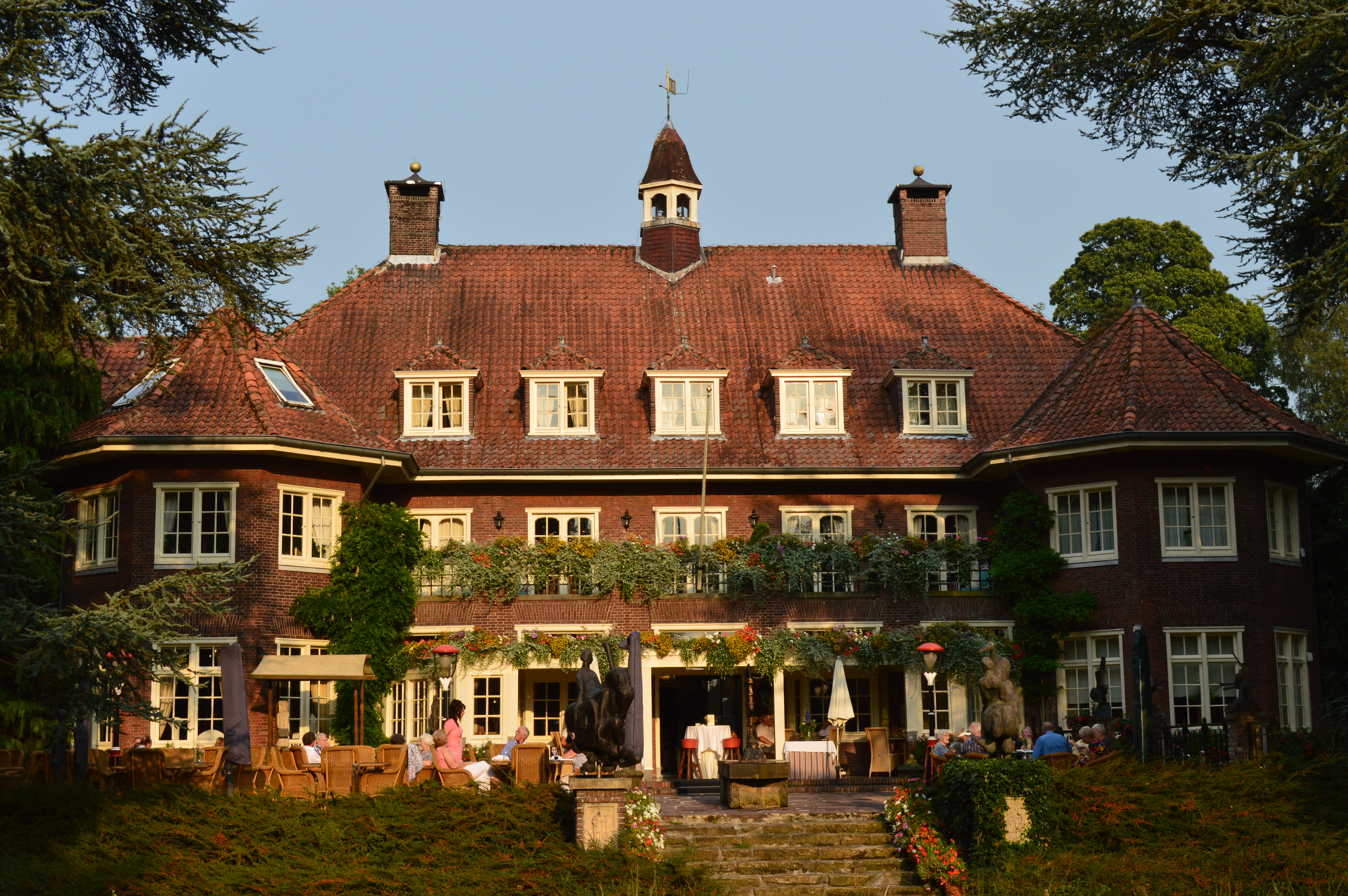
- Retirement home Rustoord

- Location in the province of North Brabant in the Netherlands Esbeek (Netherlands)
- Coordinates: 51°28′N 5°08′E
- Country: Netherlands
- Province: North Brabant
- Municipality: Hilvarenbeek

Area
  - Total: 25.98 km^{2} (10.03 sq mi)
- Elevation: 19 m (62 ft)

Population (2021)
  - Total: 1,240
  - Density: 47.7/km^{2} (124/sq mi)
- Time zone: UTC+1 (CET)
  - Summer (DST): UTC+2 (CEST)
- Postal code: 5085
- Dialing code: 013

Esbeek is a village with 1,200 inhabitants. It is one of the six church villages of the municipality of Hilvarenbeek, which has a total of 15,000 inhabitants. Esbeek is located on the high sandy soils in the south of the Netherlands in the province of North Brabant, on the border with Belgium.

The village originated from a ring structured village around farm fields, the structure of which can still be recognized today. In addition to Esbeek, it includes the neighborhoods of 'Groenstraat' and 'Hoogeind'. The field is located on the western bank of the Spruitenstroompje, a stream that flows into the 'Reusel' five kilometers north of the village of Diessen.

Esbeek became its own parish in 1889 and a small village center arose around the church that was inaugurated in 1890. Also around this time a steam tram came from Tilburg to Poppel. The 'Oude Trambaan', a broad lane that separates the forests of the 'Rovertsche Heide' and 'Landgoed de Utrecht', is a testament to this. There was also activity in the form of a brick factory. The local brick industry was started around 1900 by the Zeebregts family, a family of masons and contractors. From 1923 there was a brick factory that worked on a larger scale. This became the largest employer in Esbeek. The brick-making activities stopped in 2008.

== Esbeek village center ==
The village center itself only came into being in its current form in the last quarter of the 19th century. This concentration was created at the time by the construction of the first church with all outbuildings and the adjacent 'Dorpsstraat'. Gradually, several streets were added to this core, particularly since the 1950s. There are hardly any Kempian long-walled farms within this core. This mainly concerns detached houses that are characterized as simple volumes of one or two storeys. These homes display the typical style of detached homes in North Brabant. The more recent houses date back to the architecture of farm houses and long-walled farms from previous centuries. The church was reconstructed in 1937 in a traditionalist style inspired by rural medieval architecture. In the same style, the parsonage and the rest of the outbuildings have been adjusted or rebuilt, so that a beautiful ensemble was created. The whole is protected as a national monument. This architecture has been carefully preserved in recent renovations.

== From brick factory to industrial estate "De Mierbeek" ==
At the end of the last century, new activity was created around the existing brick factory in the form of the De Mierbeek industrial estate. Various companies are moving from the center of the village to this site. In terms of activity, a substantial transition has taken place in agriculture. Many companies have stopped. Tree cultivation is a new development in land use. Switching to services in the recreational sector has also taken place. Several leading companies have emerged in this area. In the last fifteen years many small self-employed people have started working as new forms of business. A total of 241 companies are currently registered with the Chamber of Commerce in Esbeek.

== Esbeek now ==
Esbeek established a village cooperative in 2006, called 'Coöperatie Esbeek'. The majority of the inhabitants and institutions in Esbeek are members of this cooperative association. The main objective of the village cooperative is that Esbeek remains an active and attractive village for living, working and recreation. The cooperative supports and realizes initiatives by members and / or the government that make the village more sustainable in spatial, economic or social terms. Because the initiatives come from the inhabitants of the village itself, there is great motivation and involvement in projects.

In 2007 Coöperatie Esbeek bought 'café Schuttershof', the last pub in the village center, to preserve and strengthen it as the central meeting point of the village. The financing was made possible by the issue of certificates (shares) to members of the cooperative.

In 2019, Esbeek won the Dutch Village Renewal Award from the Association of Small Villages for all its efforts to keep the village attractive and livable for the future. To convince the jury, a (rap)film was made that shows how Esbeek has prepared for the future: "Straight Outta Esbeek" (https://www.youtube.com/watch?v=lT7QuEXeBZ4)

== Landscape types ==
Esbeek is entirely located in the Brabant sandy area. The soil consists of cover sand that has been blown up from the fallen North Sea floor during the last ice age. Five different landscape types occur within Esbeek. The most characteristic type of landscape is the stream valley landscape. You also have the Kampen and Hoeven landscape and in the naturally wooded environments the Oude- en Jonge sand extraction areas have been created. In addition to these four landscape types, there are also wooded areas with heathland within the municipality. These are mainly found in the estates that Esbeek has.

== Estate "De Utrecht" ==
De Utrecht estate is located in Esbeek. Estate "De Utrecht" is rare of its kind because of the scale of the reclamation work (from 1898) and the large size of the estate. The total size of the "De Utrecht" estate is 2,485 hectares and includes approximately 1,600 hectares of forest, 600 hectares of agricultural land, 200 hectares of nature and 100 hectares of other areas (golf course, roads, water and yards). There are 11 agricultural companies (dairy cattle, calves, horses, trees and a biological and biodynamic farm), 40 civilian homes, 1 catering business, 1 accommodation (300 beds) and a golf course. Under the supervision of the manager of the estate, 10 to 12 enthusiastic volunteers work two mornings a week on the forest management on the estate.

The architecture at Landgoed de Utrecht was largely realized in the years shortly after the foundation of the current estate, in the first quarter of the 20th century. The nationally renowned architects Kropholler and Staal are responsible for the most important designs (such as the Brandtoren van de Houtvesterij). They based themselves on traditional architecture from, among others, Gelderland, but also on contemporary art-nouveau architecture. Around the Brandtoren is an ensemble around a square. There is also an arboretum in the form of a walking park.

== Andreas Schotel ==
One of the most famous visitors of Esbeek was the artist Andreas Schotel. He loved the farmers life in Esbeek and stayed there during several summers in a little wooden house called 'De Schuttel'.

== Sport and club life ==
Since 1946, SV Tuldania has been the football club of Esbeek. The club with orange-black as club colors has Den Hondsbosch sports park, located on the edge of the village, as its home port. In addition to the soccer fields of SV Tuldania, this sports park also has the tennis courts of TCE, the korfball courts of DKV Tuldania and a gym.

Esbeek also has a longbow archery. The village consists of a close-knit community and a very active social life. In 2007 the residents jointly took over the village pub and thus became jointly owned, to prevent the pub from closing definitively. This was made possible by around 500 residents who put money into the shares of the café, subsidy and a loan on favorable terms from the local bank.

Since 2001 Esbeek has its own golf course, Golfclub Midden-Brabant.

Esbeek has its own religious community under the name of St. Adrianus. This religious community was established in 2015, when the village church was closed by the diocese of 's-Hertogenbosch for Roman Catholic worship. The meetings take place on most Sundays in the local village hall, the former Schuttershof café.

== Gallery ==
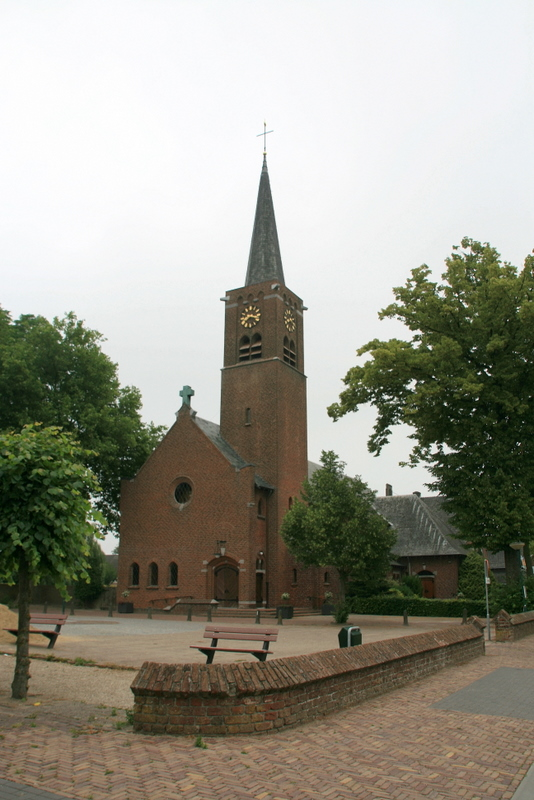
