= Speelland Beekse Bergen =

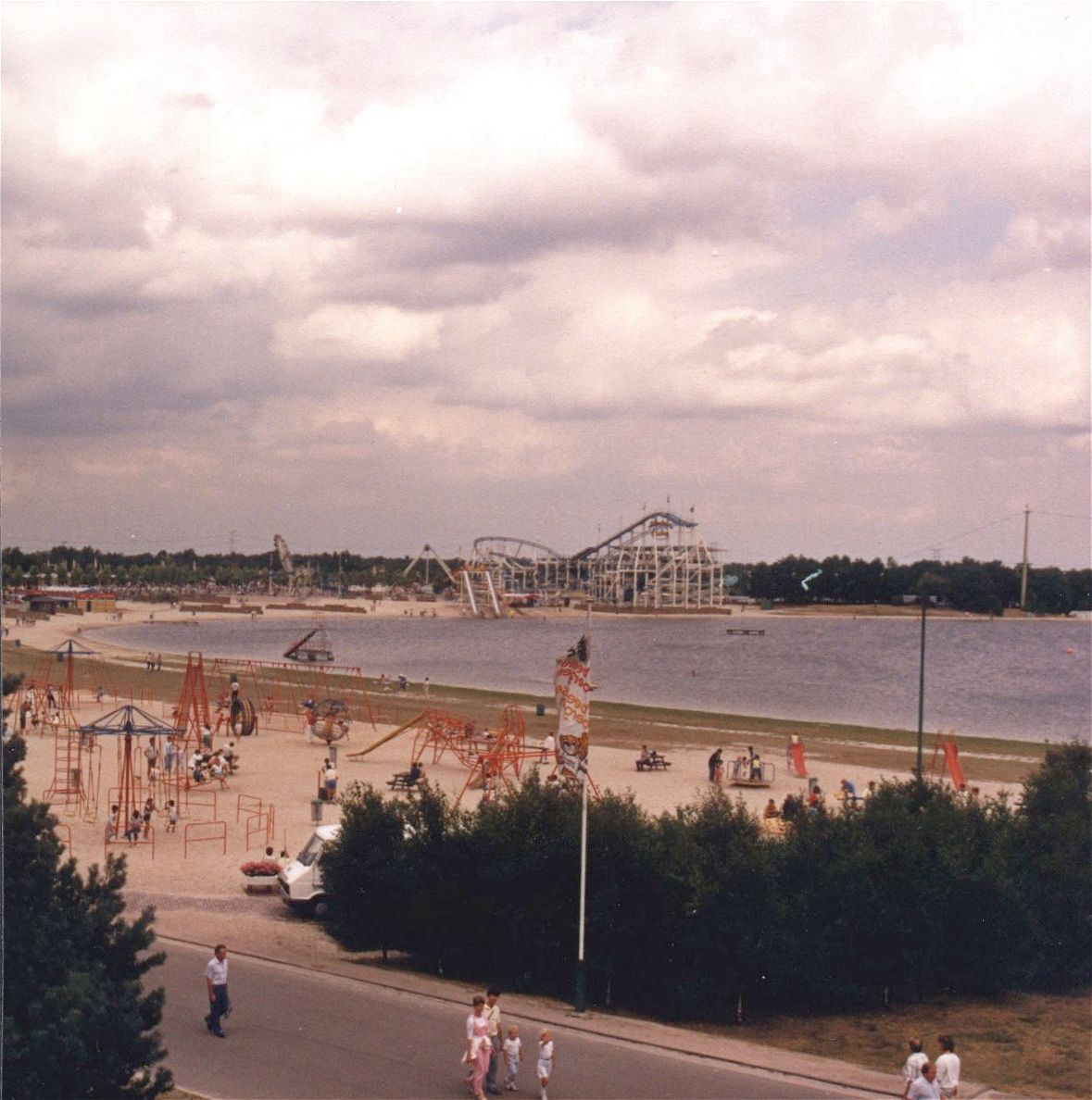
- Speelland Beekse Bergen in 1986
- Interactive map of Speelland Beekse Bergen
- Type: Amusement Park
- Location: Hilvarenbeek, Netherlands
- Coordinates: 51.527°N 5.125°E
- Operator: Libéma Exploitatie BV
- Visitors: 235,000
- Status: Open April to October
- Website: beeksebergen.nl/spelen

Speelland Beekse Bergen is an amusement park and playground near Hilvarenbeek, Netherlands. It is a part of the Beekse Bergen group which also owns Safaripark Beekse Bergen. The park has been a part of Libéma Exploitatie since 1987. Most of Speelland is playgrounds, a beach, and water attractions.

== History ==
About 1960 a large lake was created between Tilburg and Hilvarenbeek due to a large amount of sand being extracted. After a few years Lion Park Beekse Bergen, a zoo, was opened next to the lake.

At the same time another park opened its doors at the other side of the lake: Speelland Beekse Bergen. Later the zoo was renamed Safaripark Beekse Bergen. At first, Speelland (in English Play Land) mainly aimed at summer recreation. Later the park was enlarged with different playgrounds and attractions, becoming a small attraction park. Speelland is a part of the company Libéma since 1987.

== Park ==
Speelland mainly focuses on families with children until the age of 12. A large part of the park is filled by a sand beach.

== Attractions ==
This is an overview of attractions in Speelland Beekse Bergen. Not all attractions are included with the general entrance fee.

- Wave Rider, a carrousel in the water
- Aquashutlle, children are being launched into the water
- Waterslides
- Sahara buggy-track, children follow a track per buggy
- Trampolines
- Verkeersland (in English Traffic Land), children can drive around in their own 'car'
- Bumpy Boats
- Pedalos, visitors can explore the water per swan-boat
- Midgetgolf
- Funwheels
- Big Wheels
- Minicars €0,50 per time
- Kidcars €2 per time
- Pony Riding
- Avontureneiland (English: Adventure Island), large playground
- Formula-1-pedal cars
- Water Guns
- Petting Zoo
- Cruise Boat, brings visitors to vacation park Beekse Bergen
- Schommeleiland, (English: Swing-Island), an island with only swings
- Ballenberg, (English: Ballmountain), a climbing tower made out of large balls
- Inflatable pillow
- Power Paddler, children can ride their own boat
- Speelstraat (in English Play Street), large playground

=== Events ===
Every season a number of events are organized in Speelland Beekse Bergen. Most of the events carry a theme, such as pirates or cowboys and Indians.
