= Safaripark Beekse Bergen =

Wildlife zoo in the Netherlands

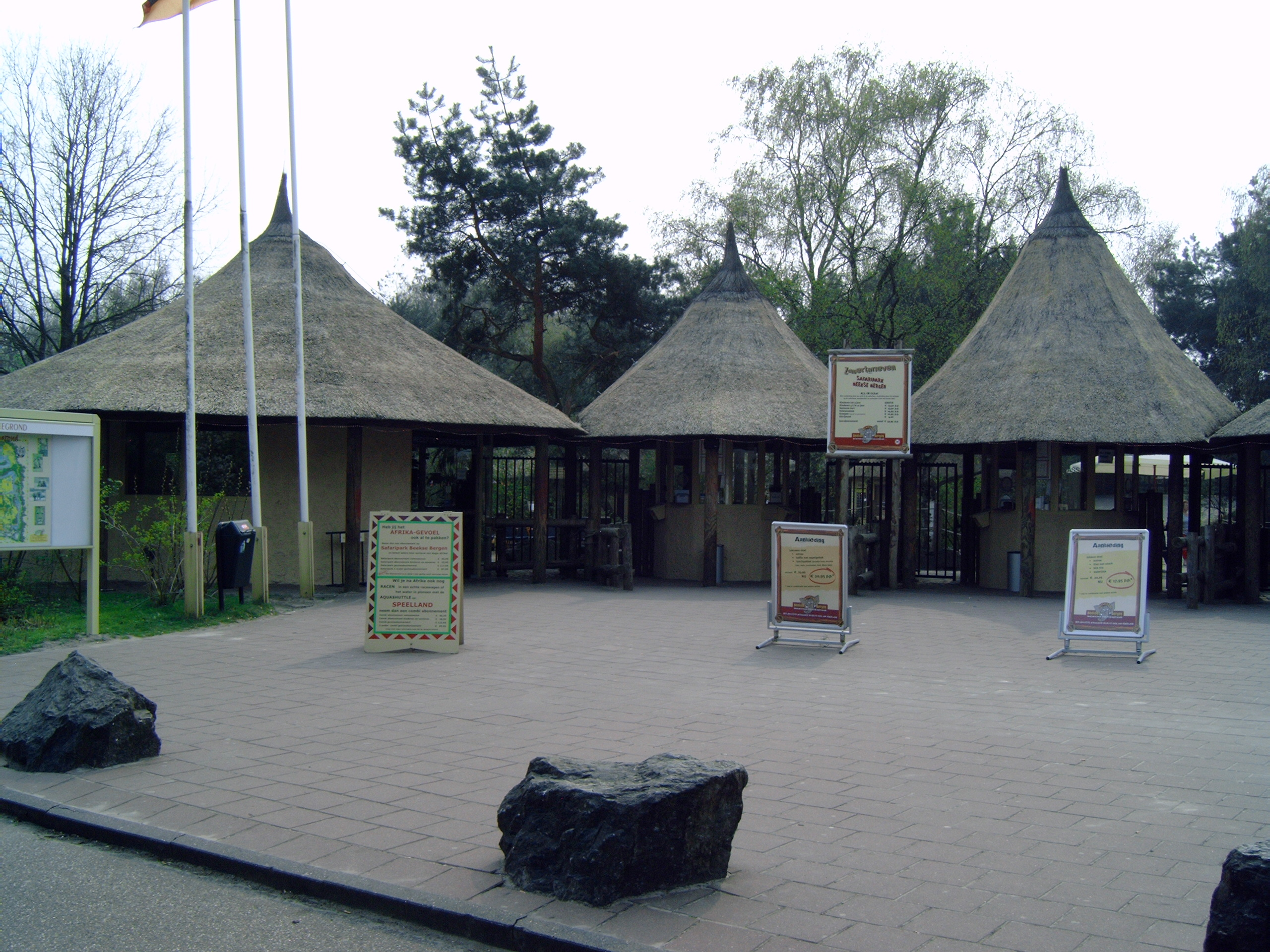
- Entrance Safaripark Beekse Bergen
- Interactive map of Safaripark Beekse Bergen
- 51°31′10″N 5°6′34″E
- Date opened: 1968
- Location: Hilvarenbeek, Netherlands
- No. of animals: 1,500
- No. of species: 170
- Annual visitors: 850.000 (2013)
- Website: Safaripark Beekse Bergen

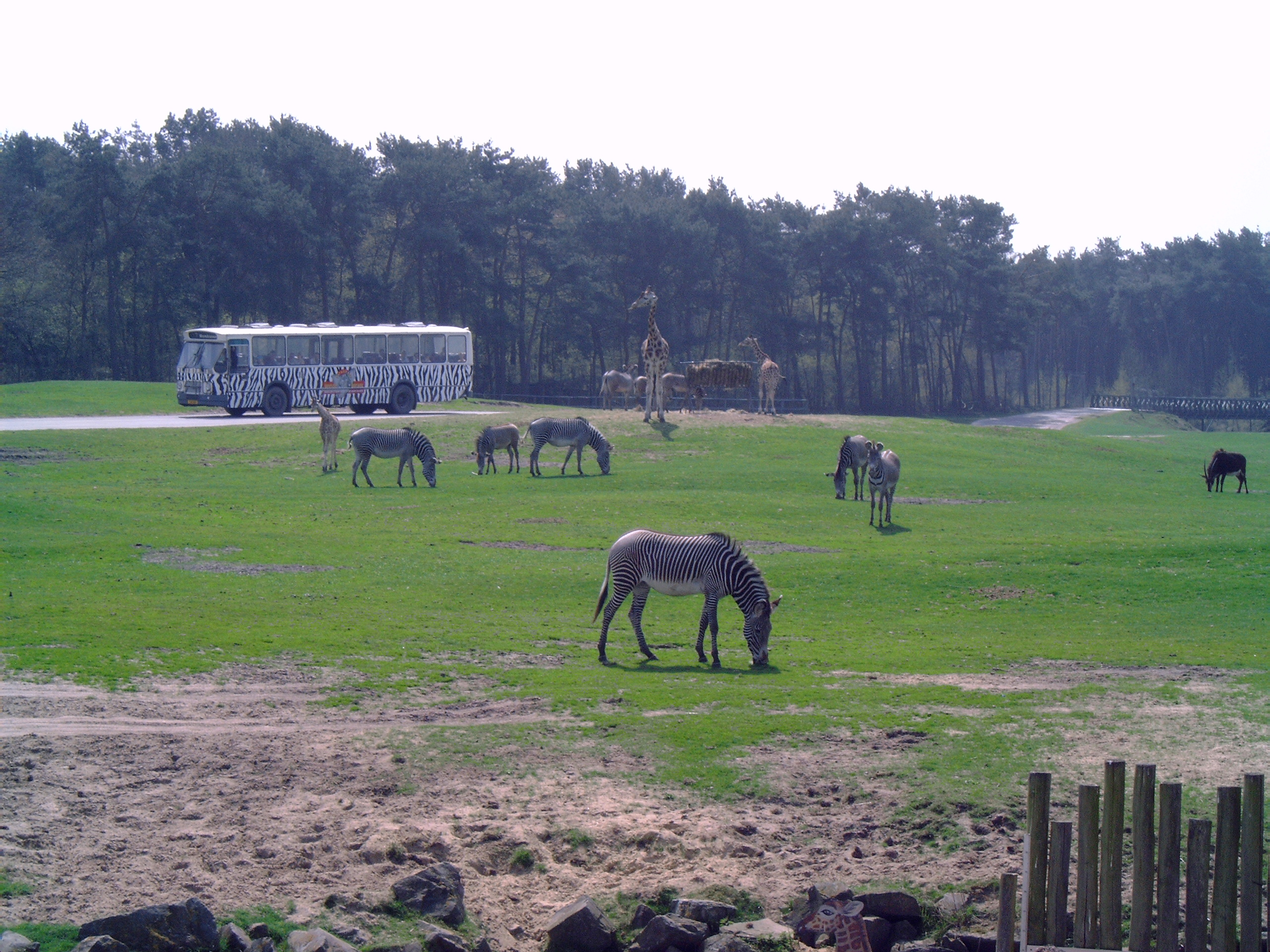
One of the savannahs of Safaripark Beekse Bergen

Safaripark Beekse Bergen is the largest wildlife zoo of the Benelux region and provides a home to approximately 1,250 animals from over 150 species, varying from small mammals to large birds. It is located between the cities of Tilburg and Hilvarenbeek in the south of the Netherlands. The visitors can for instance watch zebras and giraffes on the spacious savannahs. Safaripark Beekse Bergen offers the possibility to explore the park on numerous safaris: walksafari, carsafari, bussafari and boatsafari.

The park is owned by the company Libéma Exploitatie BV, which is one of the largest leisure-related companies in the Netherlands.

What makes the park so special is that visitors can explore the park with their own car, without a fence in between the visitor and the animals. While driving through the park people can for instance encounter leopards and zebras or get their car 'washed' by a giraffe. In this way the visitor can imagine that they are really taking a safari in Africa. Visitors can also choose to follow the same route per bus. In this way they will get to know more information about the animals, since they will be joined by a Ranger.

Besides these two ways of exploring the park, the visitor can also choose to take a boat, that plies between two piers in the park. The visitors can also watch the animals by foot on the approximately 5 kilometres of roads throughout the park.

All of the above-mentioned safari possibilities can be combined. All the safaris start at the front of the park and come together at a parking side at the backside of the park, close to the Kongorestaurant.

Another feature of the park for which it is very well known is its bird show.

All animals receive a strict diet, as a result of which feeding the animals is prohibited.

== History ==
In 1968 the “Lion Park Beekse Bergen” was opened, in which visitors could observe lions from their car. Because this idea was new for the Netherlands it became a major success. Two years later two extra terrains were opened, in which leopards and baboons could be seen. In the next four years seven more types of animals were added to the park, for instance zebras, giraffes and an elephant. Because the park did now not only concern lions anymore, the name was changed in 1974 into Safaripark Beekse Bergen.

In 1980 the total size of the park had grown to 120 hectares and six more types of animal had been added. Until that point there had only been a car safari, but in 1982 a walking safari was opened. This was only at a small part of the park, but it gave the visitors a chance to observe various sorts of animals which were too small to be shown in the open car safari areas. Furthermore, a bird show was opened in 1984, which was another unique experience for the Netherlands.

In the years that followed the park became less popular and it looked like the Safaripark would go bankrupt. However, in 1987 the organization Libéma bought the park and with this new owner the park started evolving again. The walking safari was enhanced and a bus safari and boat safari were added. Today Libéma is still the owner and the Safaripark Beekse Bergen has become the fourth zoo of the Netherlands.

Part of the Beekse Bergen resort, entirely owned by Libéma, is Speelland Beekse Bergen, an outdoor and indoor amusement park for families with children. The park is located adjacent to Safaripark Beekse Bergen and an integrated part of the entire resort, which further consists of holiday parks Lake Resort, Safari Resort as well as the Safari Hotel. The various parks are increasingly working together providing a fully immersive safari experience. This is achieved by increasingly integrating the previously segregated management teams. For instance, the Safaripark manager now also runs Speelland and similar management integration is applied to all the shops. The idea is to let the various parks and entities become in line with each other more, so that a day-trip to Beekse Bergen really becomes like a day-trip to Africa.

On October 24, 2026, a 40-year-old zookeeper was mauled by one or two of the zoo's Persian leopards. She was able to alert her colleagues and was taken to a hospital in a helicopter, where she died of her injuries three days later.

== Objectives ==
Safaripark Beekse Bergen has a few idealistic objectives. The park wants to contribute to the conservation of nature in de broadest way of the word. They do this by means of:

- conservation of threatened species
- education
- scientific research
- active participation in worldwide conservation programmes.

To support these objectives, Safaripark Beekse Bergen participates in a number of organisations:

- NVD = Dutch Association of Zoos
- SDH = Foundation Zoos Help, the nature conversation programme of the NVD
- EAZA = European Association of Zoos and Aquaria

Furthermore, Safaripark Beekse Bergen participate in the following conservation programmes:

- African wild dogs in Zimbabwe
- Siberian tigers and Amur leopards in Siberia
- Sloth bears in India

== Breeding programmes ==
As a member of EAZA, Safaripark Beekse Bergen cooperates with European management programmes for threatened species such as the European Endangered Species Programme (EEP) and European Studbooks (ESB).

The threatened species in the collection of the safari park are: red ruffed lemur, ring-tailed lemur, African wild dog, leopard, African elephant, black and white rhinoceros, Grévy zebra, Rothschild giraffe, African penguin, white-cheeked gibbon, red panda, Siberian tiger, Przewalski horse, Mesopotamic deer, Vietnamese sika deer and Chilean flamingo.

Besides EEP Safaripark Beekse Bergen also participates in European Studbooks (ESB). These are animals that are being observed intensively and have a chance to become a threatened species in the future. Safari Beekse Bergen participates in this programme for: spotted hyena, warthog, sitatunga, markhor, sable antelope, blesbok, white-handed gibbon, sun bear and squirrel monkey.

== Animals ==
The word 'safari' for many people is a reference to Africa. The park's name is an indicator that it focuses on conserving and observing African animals. Although the park's history and the weather in the Netherlands make a 'realistic African experience' nearly impossible. During the 1990s, the park attempted to provide visitors 'a journey around the world in one day', and has sections devoted to the fauna of the American, Asian, European and Australian continents. The Australian and American sections have since then been removed and all animals from those continents have left the collection, with the European collection now being limited to red deer and domestic cattle. These days, the zoo's main focus is Africa, but Asia is still represented as well.

== See also ==
- Speelland Beekse Bergen
