= Baarschot, Deurne =

Baarschot Baorschot (Brabantian)
- Hamlet
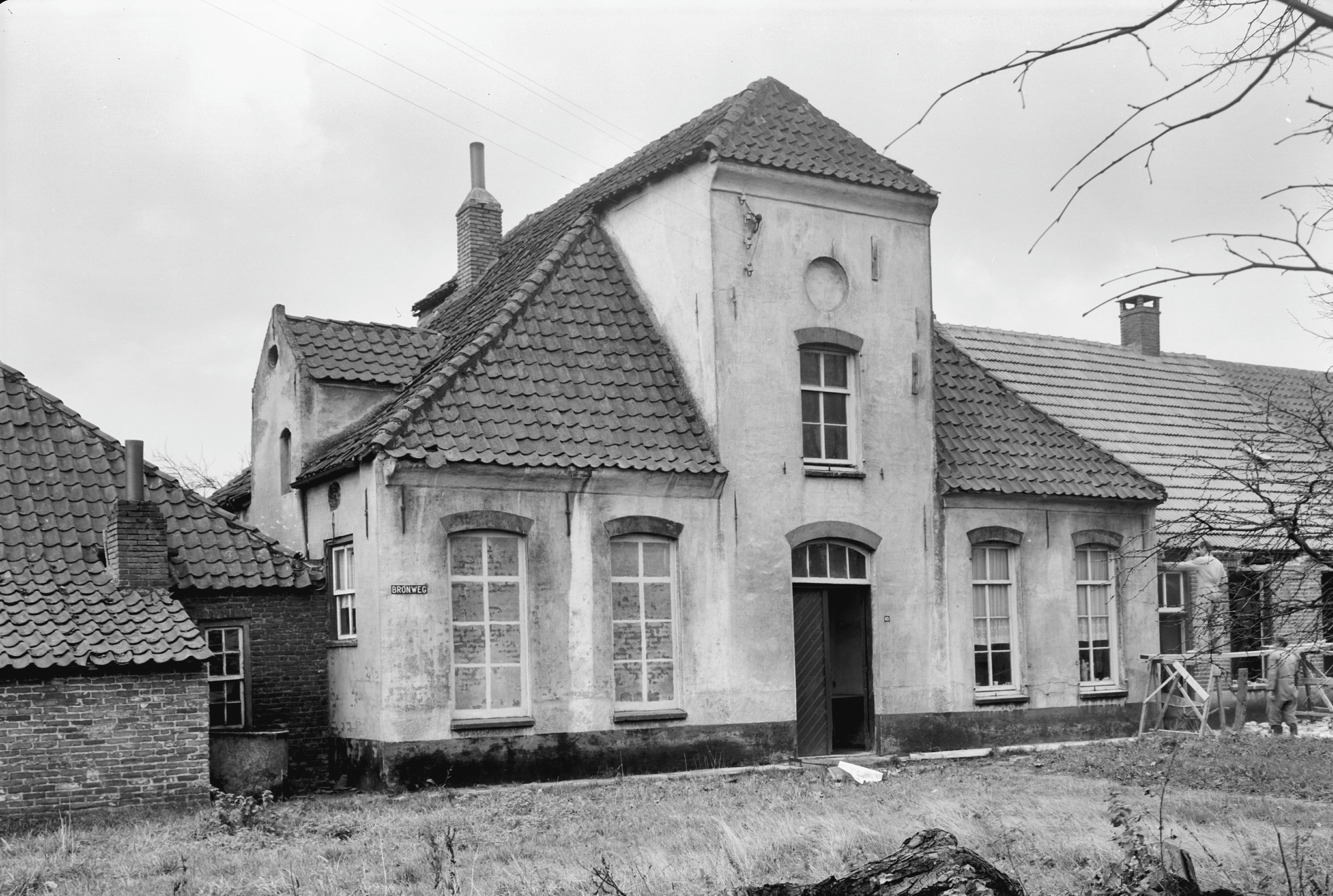
- Monumental country house in Baarschot, 1963

- Location in the province of North Brabant in the Netherlands Location in the Netherlands
- Coordinates: 51°26′N 5°46′E
- Country: Netherlands
- Province: North Brabant
- Municipality: Deurne
- Village: Vlierden
- Elevation: 24.8 m (81 ft)

Population (2020)
  - Total: c. 65
- Time zone: UTC+1 (CET)
  - Summer (DST): UTC+2 (CEST)
- Postcode: 5756
- Area code: 0493

Baarschot (Dutch pronunciation: [ˈbaːr.sxɔt]; Brabantian: Baorschot) is a hamlet in the municipality of Deurne in the province of North Brabant in the Netherlands.

Baaorschot, a name that means "a high piece of land protruding from a swampy area", is a medieval hamlet on several higher Geests along the valley of the Astense Aa in the former municipality of Vlierden, the village area of which it is still a part administratively.

== Country house of the De Maurissens family ==
Until 1965, the hamlet, mainly consisting of farms, housed the country house of the noble De Maurissens family. This house was built before 1795, probably earlier in the 18th century. It consisted of a single-story symmetrical house with a roof and a raised center section above the door. There were two tall sliding windows on either side of the door, as well as above the door in the raised center section.
