= Diessen =

- Village
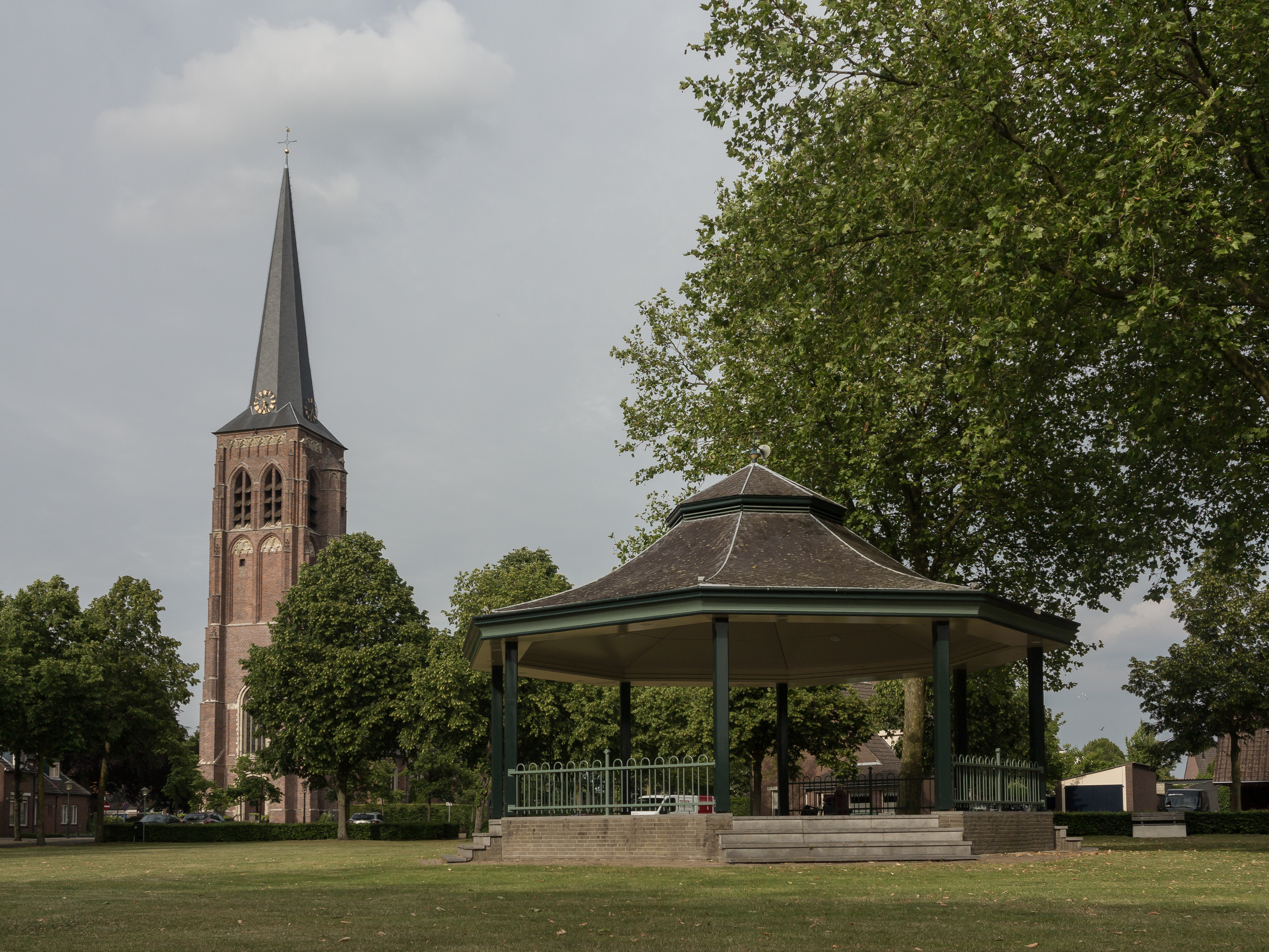
- St Willibrordus Church

- Flag Coat of arms

- Location in the province of North Brabant in the Netherlands Diessen (Netherlands)
- Coordinates: 51°28′26″N 5°10′29″E
- Country: Netherlands
- Province: North Brabant
- Municipality: Hilvarenbeek

Area
  - Total: 2.09 km^{2} (0.81 sq mi)
- Elevation: 17 m (56 ft)

Population (2021)
  - Total: 2,955
  - Density: 1,410/km^{2} (3,660/sq mi)
- Time zone: UTC+1 (CET)
  - Summer (DST): UTC+2 (CEST)
- Postal code: 5087
- Dialing code: 013

Diessen is a village in the Dutch province of North Brabant. It is located in the municipality of Hilvarenbeek.

== History ==
The village was first mentioned in 380 as Deusone, and relates to the Dieze River. The etymology is unclear. Diessen developed in the Early Middle Ages around the Reusel stream.

The St Willibrordus church, with a choir from the early-15th century, had a nave from around 1450. The tower was probably built in 1527. The church was restored between 1970 and 1973, and some of the 19th century modifications have been undone.

Diessen was home to 1,003 people in 1840. Diessen was a separate municipality until 1997, when it was merged with Hilvarenbeek.

Diessen is hypothesized to be the birthplace Deusone of the Gallic Emperor Postumus.

== Gallery ==
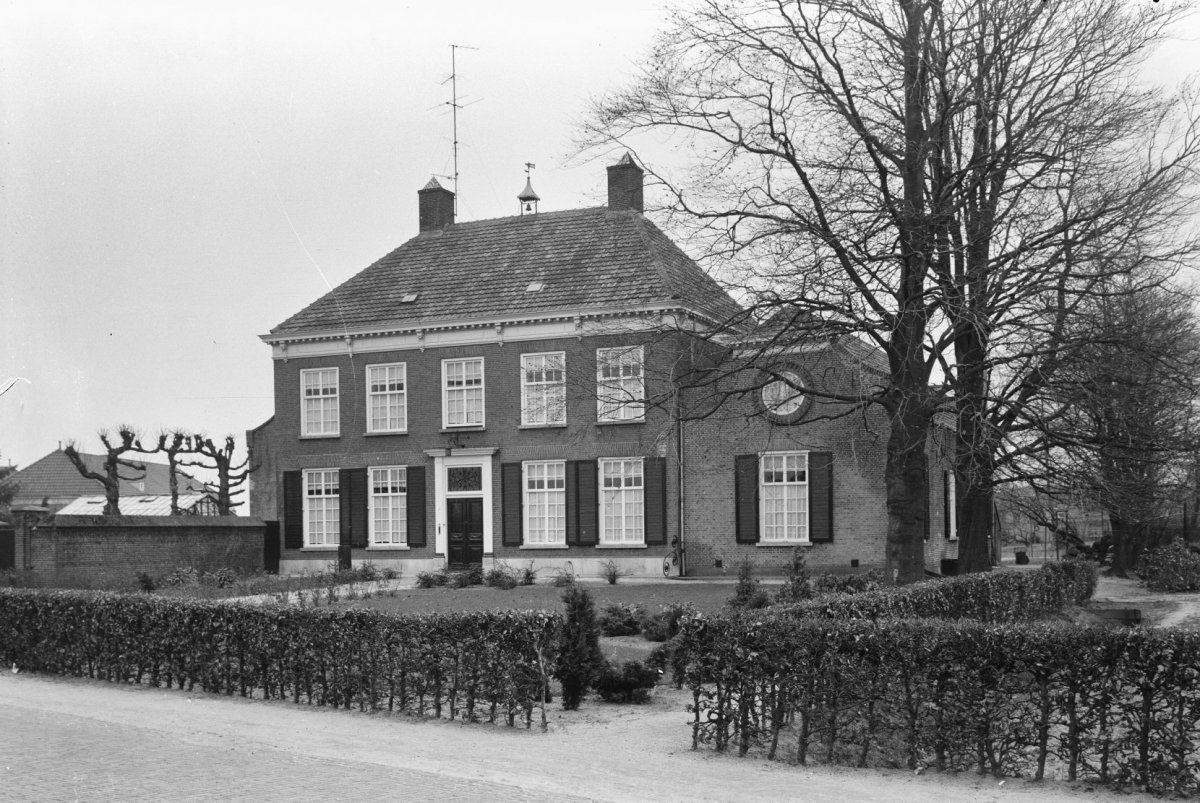
Villa in Diessen

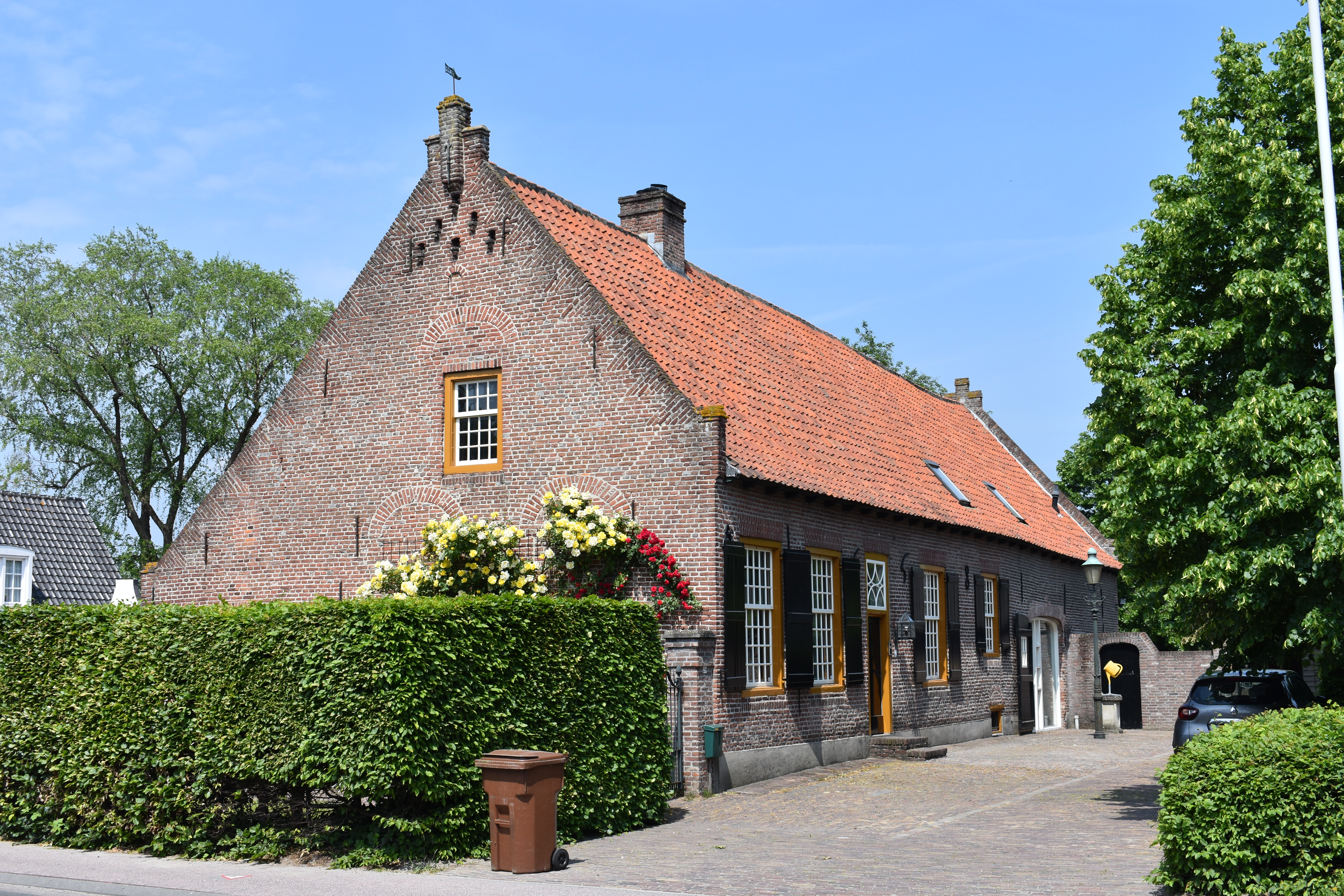
House in Diessen
